= List of state highways in South Carolina =

State Highways of South Carolina
- Highway marker of SC 9, SC 34, and SC 121

System information
- Maintained by SCDOT
- Length: 41,414 mi (66,649 km)
- Formed: 1922
- State: South Carolina Highway nn (SC nn)

System links
- South Carolina State Highway System; Interstate; US; State; Scenic

This is a List of state highways in South Carolina. These state highways are owned and maintained by the U.S. state of South Carolina, through the South Carolina Department of Transportation (SCDOT).

== List of primary routes ==
Since its establishment, there have been countless removals and reestablishment of highways in the state (check notes for current or last form count). Typically, it is that one highway wins favor over another, while the other highway is either absorbed or downgraded to a secondary road.

Number	Length (mi)	Length (km)	Southern or western terminus	Northern or eastern terminus	Formed	Removed	Notes
SC 1	—	—	Georgia state line southwest of Limehouse	SC 12 in West Columbia	1922	1928	
SC 2	3.940	6.341	US 21/US 176/US 321 in Cayce	US 378 in West Columbia	1922	current	
SC 3	—	—	SC 50 in Columbia	NC 202 at the North Carolina state line near Nichols	1922	1928	First form
SC 3	96.310	154.996	US 278 / Mill Pond Road in Grays	US 321 in Swansea	1928	current	Second form
SC 4	54.430	87.597	US 78 east of Aiken	US 21 / US 21 Bus. / US 601 Truck near Wilkinson Heights	1922	current	
SC 5	51.719	83.234	US 521 near Van Wyck	I-85 / SC 198 in Blacksburg	1922	current	
SC 6	116.092	186.832	US 76 in Ballentine	US 52 / SC 6 Truck / Main Street Extension in Moncks Corner	1922	current	
SC 7	—	—	Georgia state line southwest of Calhoun Falls	NC 51 at the North Carolina state line near Fort Mill	1922	1942	First form
SC 7	5.920	9.527	US 17 in Charleston	US 52 / US 78 in North Charleston	1956	current	Second form
SC 8	—	—	SR 8 at the Georgia state line near Starr	US 29 at the North Carolina state line northeast of Blacksburg	1922	1927	First form
SC 8	44.030	70.859	US 276 west of Cleveland	US 25 / SC 418 in Ware Place	1928	current	Second form
SC 9	259.570	417.737	SC 65 in Cherry Grove Beach	NC 9 at the North Carolina state line near Fingerville	1922	current	
SC 10	22.790	36.677	SC 28 northwest of McCormick	US 25 Bus. / US 178 / SC 34 in Greenwood	1922	current	
SC 11	119.850	192.880	I-85 southwest of Fair Play	SC 150 in Gaffney	1922	current	
SC 12	—	—	Georgia state line south of North Augusta	SC 2 in West Columbia	1922	1928	First form
SC 12	—	—	SC 26 in Hancock	NC 25 at the North Carolina state line northeast of Hancock	1929	1938	Second form
SC 12	28.250	45.464	US 1 in West Columbia	I-20 / US 601 south of Lugoff	1940	current	Third form
SC 13	—	—	SC 14 in Pickens	SC 2 in Easley	1922	1928	First form
SC 13	—	—	SR 13 at the Georgia state line southwest of Westminster	Greenville	1928	1946	Second form
SC 14	—	—	SC 15 in Anderson	NC 283 at the North Carolina state line near Rocky Bottom	1922	1937	First form
SC 14	59.240	95.338	US 76 Bus. in Laurens	I-26 / Landrum Road in Landrum	1942	current	Second form
SC 15	—	—	SC 2 in Calhoun	SC 92 near Cross Anchor	1922	1935	
SC 16	—	—	SC 2 in Columbia	NC 16 at the North Carolina state line northeast of Bowling Green	1922	1931	First form
SC 16	—	—	SC 48 in Columbia	SC 12 in Columbia	1939	1948	Second form
SC 16	9.550	15.369	SC 48 in Columbia	US 176 / Clement Road in Columbia	1964	current	Third form
SC 17	—	—	SR 17 at the Georgia state line southwest of Westminster	SC 2 in Seneca	1922	1928	
SC 18	—	—	SC 20 in Abbeville	Georgia state line northwest of Long Creek	1922	1938	First form
SC 18	39.040	62.829	US 176 / SC 18 Truck / SC 215 in Union	NC 18 at the North Carolina state line near Blacksburg	1938	current	Second form
SC 19	28.750	46.269	Savannah River Site south of New Ellenton	US 25 / SC 121 southwest of Trenton	1922	current	
SC 20	53.210	85.633	Washington Street / Trinity Street in Abbeville	McBee Avenue / River Street / Richardson Street in Greenville	1922	current	
SC 21	—	—	Georgia state line at North Augusta	North Carolina state line near Cleveland	1922	1928	
SC 22	—	—	SC 21 in Greenwood	SC 97 in Great Falls	1922	1952	First form
SC 22	29.390	47.299	US 501 near Cool Spring	US 17 / Kings Road west of Briarcliff Acres	2001	current	Second form; projected to become part of I-73
SC 23	—	—	SC 3 in Pee Dee	NC 22 at the North Carolina state line near Dillon	1922	1928	First form
SC 23	47.060	75.736	US 221 / SC 28 in Modoc	US 1 in Batesburg–Leesville	c. 1929	current	Second form
SC 24	—	—	Georgia state line near Mountain Rest	US 78 east of Dorchester	1922	1938	First form
SC 24	30.660	49.342	US 76 / US 123 / Oak Street in Westminster	US 29 Bus. / US 76 / US 178 / SC 28 Bus. / SC 81 in Anderson	1938	current	Second form
SC 25	—	—	SC 21 in Hodges	SC 20 in Donalds	1922	1929	
SC 26	—	—	SC 40 north of Georgetown	North Carolina state line near Fort Mill	1922	1933	First form
SC 26	—	—	US 301 in Orangeburg	US 1 in Lugoff	1935	1951	Second form
SC 27	—	—	SC 19 / SC 21 in Trenton	SC 2 east of Dorchester	1922	1927	First form
SC 27	19.511	31.400	SC 61 in Givhans	US 176 near Sandridge	c. 1929	current	Second form
SC 28	131.220	211.178	SR 28 at the Georgia state line near Mountain Rest SR 28 at the Georgia state line northwest of Beech Island	SR 28 at the Georgia state line near Clarks Hill US 278 / SC 125 in Beech Island	1922	current	
SC 28Y	—	—	SC 72 southwest of Abbeville	SC 28 southwest of Abbeville	c. 1941	1957	
SC 28Y	—	—	SC 28 in Yemassee	US 17/US 21 in Yemassee	1938	1947	
SC 29	—	—	SC 21 in Travelers Rest	North Carolina state line near Cleveland	1922	c. 1925	
SC 30	—	—	Beaufort	North Carolina state line near McColl	1922	1933	First form
SC 30	—	—	US 221 in Watts Mills	SC 92 near Cross Anchor	1935	1956	Second form
SC 30	3.050	4.908	SC 171 in James Island	Lockwood Drive in Charleston	c. 1995	current	Third form; projected to become part of an extension of I-526
SC 31	—	—	—	Goose Creek	1922	1951	First form
SC 31	—	—	SC 7 in Charleston	SC 642 in North Charleston	c. 1985	c. 1990	Second form
SC 31	28.097	45.218	SC 707 near Socastee	SC 9 in Little River	c. 2002	current	Third form; projected to become part of I-74
SC 32	—	—	SC 30 near Henderson	SC 6 near Jacksonboro	1922	c. 1925	
SC 32	—	—	SC 30 in Gardens Corner	SC 6 in Jacksonboro	c. 1926	1951	
SC 33	19.360	31.157	US 301 / US 601 / SC 4 / Andrew Dibble Street in Orangeburg	SC 267 northwest of Lone Star	1922	current	
SC 34	185.930	299.225	US 25 Bus. / US 178 Bus. / SC 10 in Greenwood	US 301 / US 501 / SC 9 / SC 57 in Dillon	1922	current	
SC 35	—	—	SC 41 in Darlington	North Carolina state line near Pageland	1922	1938	First form
SC 35	5.630	9.061	I-77 in Cayce	US 378 / Seminole Drive in Columbia	c. 1996	current	Second form
SC 36	—	—	Near Ridgeland	US 21 in Rowesville	1922	1951	
SC 37	15.430	24.832	US 278 north of Barnwell	SC 39 southwest of Springfield	1922	current	
SC 38	43.694	70.319	US 501 east of Sellers	NC 38 at the North Carolina state line near Bennettsville	1922	current	
SC 39	100.889	162.365	US 278 / Savannah Drive southwest of Williston	US 221 in Cold Point	1922	current	
SC 40	—	—	US 17 / US 78 / SC 2 in Charleston	North Carolina state line north of Loris	1922	1933	
SC 41	—	—	SC 2 near Goose Creek	SC 50 near Cheraw at the North Carolina state line northeast of Lake View	1922	1928	First form
SC 41	—	—	US 301 near New Zion	New Zion	c. 1935	1938	Second form
SC 41	121.5	195.5	US 17 / Dingle Road in Mount Pleasant	NC 41 at the North Carolina state line northeast of Lake View	1938	current	Third form
SC 42	—	—	SC 3 in Sumter	SC 34 in Bishopville	1922	c. 1925	First form
SC 42	—	—	SC 33 northeast of Cope	SC 4 in Orangeburg	1937	1947	Second form
SC 43	—	—	SR 70 at the Georgia state line southwest of McCormick	US 1 / US 21 / SC 2 / SC 5 / SC 215 in West Columbia	1923	1952	
SC 44	—	—	SC 41 west of Gourdin	SC 40 in Georgetown	1922	1928	
SC 44	—	—	SC 261 in Sanders Corner	SC 30 in Mannville	c. 1928	1947	
SC 45	76.060	122.407	US 17 / South Pinckney Street in McClellanville	US 15 / US 176 in Wells	1923	current	
SC 46	—	—	SC 45 in Ferguson	SC 41 in Moncks Corner	c. 1923	1939	First form
SC 46	17.330	27.890	US 321 northwest of Hardeeville	US 278 / Waterford Drive east of Bluffton	1939	current	Second form
SC 46Y	—	—	US 17 in Hardeeville	SC 46 in Hardeeville	c. 1939	c. 1942	
SC 47	—	—	SC 40 in Green Sea	NC 21 at the North Carolina state line northeast of Lake View	c. 1923	c. 1925	First form
SC 47	5.740	9.238	US 301 east of Oaks Crossroads	SC 6 / SC 47 Truck / SC 267 in Elloree	c. 1929	current	Second form
SC 48	28.980	46.639	US 21 / US 76 / US 176 / US 321 in Columbia	US 601 in Wateree	1930	current	
SC 49	—	—	SC 26 / SC 40 in Georgetown	NC 30 at the North Carolina state line near Little River	c. 1929	1935	First form
SC 49	79.516	127.969	US 221 / Smith Road in Watts Mills	NC 49 at the North Carolina state line in Lake Wylie	1938	current	Second form
SC 50	—	—	SC 2 in Columbia	NC 50 at the North Carolina state line near Wallace	1922	1928	First form
SC 50	—	—	US 21 / SC 5 in Rock Hill	Mill Street in Rock Hill	c. 1942	1947	Second form
SC 51	70.65	113.70	US 701 north of Georgetown US 21 north of Fort Mill	US 76 / Evans Street in Florence NC 51 at the North Carolina state line near Fort Mill	c. 1926	current	
SC 52	—	—	SC 31 / SC 45 in St. Matthews	SC 3 near Eastover	c. 1926	1935	
SC 53	11.900	19.151	US 378 southwest of Shiloh	SC 403 in Hobbs Crossroads	c. 1926	current	
SC 54	—	—	SC 3 in Sumter	SC 51 in Salem	c. 1926	1951	
SC 55	—	—	SC 21 near Greenwood	SC 24 in Friendship	c. 1926	1929	First form
SC 55	20.990	33.780	SC 5 near Kings Creek	SC 49 / SC 274 / Lake Wylie Road southwest of Lake Wylie	1929	current	Second form
SC 56	67.300	108.309	SC 39 near Chappells	US 176 on the Southern Shops–Valley Falls line	c. 1926	current	
SC 57	25.880	41.650	SC 41 / SC 41 Alt. in Fork	Fairley Road at the North Carolina state line northeast of Minturn	c. 1929	current	
SC 58	—	—	SC 163 west of Lake Wylie	North Carolina state line northwest of Lake Wylie	1929	1942	First form
SC 58	12.520	20.149	SC 341 in South Lynchburg	US 301 / US 378 in Turbeville	1940	current	Second form
SC 59	—	—	SC 55 east of Clover	SC 58 / SC 163 near Lake Wylie	1929	1942	First form
SC 59	15.697	25.262	I-85 / Lakeshore Drive southwest of Fair Play	US 76 / US 123 / SC 28 in Seneca	1942	current	Second form
SC 60	5.160	8.304	SC 6 / Bush River Road southwest of Irmo	US 176 on the St. Andrews–Columbia line	c. 1929	current	
SC 61	67.05	107.91	SC 30 in Charleston	US 78 near Farrells Crossroads	1923	current	
SC 62	—	—	SC 6 in Red Top	SC 61 north of Johns Island	1923	1936	First form
SC 62	—	—	US 76 / SC 2 near Ballentine	St. Andrews	1940	1947	Second form
SC 63	28.200	45.384	US 278 / Hickory Hill Road in Varnville	SC 64 Bus. in Walterboro	c. 1924	current	
SC 64	73.730	118.657	Dunbarton Boulevard / Technology Drive in Snelling	US 17 in Jacksonboro	c. 1926	current	
SC 64Y	—	—	SC 64 in Round O	North of Round O	c. 1939	c. 1942	
SC 65	—	—	US 78 near Branchville	SC 61 in Cooks Crossroads	1929	1952	First form
SC 65	4.710	7.580	US 17 in North Myrtle Beach	SC 9 in Cherry Grove Beach	1981	current	Second form
SC 66	18.550	29.853	SC 56 southwest of Joanna	SC 72 in Whitmire	1933	current	
SC 67	15.460	24.880	US 378 / Walker Road east of McCormick	US 25 / US 178 near Greenwood	1934	current	
SC 68	—	—	SC 381 near Clio	North Carolina state line northeast of Clio	c. 1935	1938	First form
SC 68	—	—	US 78 in Denmark	Voorhees College in Denmark	1938	1947	Second form
SC 68	15.330	24.671	US 278 in Almeda	US 17 Alt. / US 17 Conn. / US 21 in Yemassee	1965	current	Third form
SC 69	—	—	SC 4 in Orangeburg	SC 31 in Cameron	c. 1935	1938	First form
SC 69	—	—	SC 546 southwest of Pelion	SC 6 in Swansea	1939	1947	Second form
SC 69	—	—	US 17 in Atlantic Beach	US 17 in Cherry Grove Beach	1977	1981	Third form
SC 70	29.990	48.264	US 278 / SC 64 in Barnwell	US 301 / US 601 northwest of Cordova	1936	current	
SC 71	14.980	24.108	SC 20 in Abbeville	SC 81 east of Lowndesville	c. 1926	current	
SC 72	—	—	SC 7 southwest of Cross Hill	SC 10 in Waterloo	c. 1926	1932	First form
SC 72	—	—	SC 7 near Leeds	Leeds	1940	1942	Second form
SC 72	124.860	200.943	SR 72 at the Georgia state line southwest of Calhoun Falls	SC 122 in Rock Hill	1942	current	Third form
SC 73	—	—	SC 7 in Fort Mill	SC 26 in Indian Land	c. 1926	1928	
SC 73	—	—	SC 38 in Brownsville	SC 9 in Dillon	1932	1939	
SC 73	—	—	US 301 / US 501 in Latta	SC 57 near Fork	1939	1942	
SC 73	—	—	SR 73 at the Georgia state line southwest of Allendale	SC 5 / SC 641 in Sycamore	1942	1947	
SC 73	—	—	US 17 Bus. in Springmaid Beach	US 17 Bus. in Myrtle Beach	1960	2006	
SC 75	8.110	13.052	SC 5 / SC 75 Truck / Riverside Road in Van Wyck	NC 75 at the North Carolina state line near Lesslie	1938	current	
SC 77	—	—	SC 9 in Hickson	NC 77 at the North Carolina state line near Wallace	1938	1961	First form
SC 77	—	—	US 76 / US 378 in Columbia	I-20 on the Woodfield–Dentsville line	1981	1982	Second form; became part of I-77
SC 79	—	—	SC 6 in Denmark	Voorhees College in Denmark	c. 1935	1938	First form
SC 79	9.340	15.031	SC 9 / Brickyard Road near Bennettsville	NC 79 at the North Carolina state line near McColl	1938	current	Second form
SC 80	—	—	SC 181 in Fair Play	SC 18 in Anderson	1937	1962	First form
SC 80	5.620	9.045	SC 14 / SC 101 Truck / Tandem Drive in Greer	US 29 / SC 290 Truck / Gary Armstrong Road in Greer	2002	current	Second form
SC 81	80.890	130.180	SC 28 near Lethia	SC 124 in Greenville	c. 1926	current	
SC 82	—	—	SC 20 near Lethia	SC 81 in Starr	1928	1949	
SC 83	4.820	7.757	SC 381 northeast of Clio	NC 83 at the North Carolina state line northeast of Clio	1938	current	
SC 84	—	—	US 276 in Caesars Head State Park at the North Carolina state line northwest of Cleveland Solomon Jones Road in Jones Gap State Park at the North Carolina state line northwest of Cleveland	Solomon Jones Road in Caesars Head State Park at the North Carolina northwest of Cleveland YMCA Camp Greenville in Jones Gap State Park northwest of Cleveland	c. 1935	1947	
SC 85	—	—	SC 8 / SC 81 near Piedmont	US 29 in Piedmont	1937	1938	
SC 85	—	—	US 1 near McBee	NC 85 at the North Carolina state line near Chesterfield	1938	1961	
SC 86	12.090	19.457	SC 8 / Sitton Road south of Easley	US 25 / Sandy Springs Road southeast of Golden Grove	1938	current	
SC 87	—	—	SC 13 in Central	SC 81 northwest of Aaron	1940	1947	
SC 88	14.350	23.094	North Broad Street in Pendleton	SC 8 west of Piedmont	1939	current	Signed to begin at SC 28 Bus. in Pendleton
SC 89	—	—	SC 8 in Easley	SC 135 in Easley	1940	1947	
SC 90	23.110	37.192	US 378 Truck / US 501 Bus. / US 701 Truck / SC 90 Truck in Red Hill	US 17 / Fairway Drive in Little River	1929	current	
SC 91	—	—	SC 92 in Monarch Mill	Black Highway northwest of York	1923	1956	
SC 91	5.670	9.125	US 17 Alt southwest of Summerville	US 17 Alt in Summerville	2025	current	Second form
SC 92	16.460	26.490	SC 101 in Gray Court	SC 49 southwest of Cross Anchor	c. 1926	current	
SC 93	—	—	SC 97 northeast of Great Falls	NC 200 at the North Carolina state line near Lancaster	c. 1926	1952	
SC 93	19.760	31.801	US 76 / SC 28 in Clemson	US 123 in Easley	1964	current	
SC 94	—	—	SC 9 in Lake View	North Carolina state line northeast of Lake View	c. 1926	1938	First form
SC 94	—	—	SC 54 northwest of New Zion	SC 175 in Coopers	1938	1947	Second form
SC 95	—	—	US 1 near McBee	NC 85 at the North Carolina state line near Chesterfield	c. 1926	1938	First form
SC 95	—	—	SC 9 in Little Rock	Fairley Road at the North Carolina state line east of Clio	1939	1952	Second form
SC 96	—	—	US 1 / SC 9 in Cheraw	NC 80 at the North Carolina state line near Cheraw	1926	1933	First form
SC 96	—	—	SC 9 northwest of Bennettsville	North Carolina state line north of Bennettsville	1932	1938	Second form
SC 96	—	—	US 521 near Lancaster SC 9 near Taxahaw	SC 906 near Taxahaw SC 943 near Taxahaw	1940	1947	Third form
SC 97	89.800	144.519	US 521 / US 601 in Camden	SC 5 in Kings Creek	c. 1926	current	
SC 98	—	—	US 1 / SC 9 in Kollock	NC 77 at the North Carolina state line near Wallace	1928	1938	First form
SC 98	—	—	SC 91 south of Robat	SC 18 near Pacolet	1940	1956	Second form
SC 99	9.220	14.838	US 21 / SC 200 in Great Falls	SC 9 southeast of Richburg	1936	current	
SC 100	—	—	US 1 southwest of Cheraw	SC 9 west of Chesterfield	1940	1947	
SC 101	56.522	90.963	US 76 / Neeley Ferry Road in Hickory Tavern	SC 11 / Highway 912 near Tigerville	1928	current	
SC 102	25.550	41.119	US 15 Bus. / US 15 Truck / Patrick Highway in North Hartsville	SC 9 in Chesterfield	1936	current	
SC 103	—	—	SC 114 southeast of Gaffney	North Carolina state line near Gaffney	1937	1947	
SC 104	—	—	SC 43 in McCormick	SC 10 northeast of Troy	1939	1947	
SC 105	33.220	53.462	SC 49 south of Robat	I-85 / Hyatt Street in Gaffney	1940	current	
SC 106	—	—	Kathwood	SC 391 northeast of Aiken	1940	1947	
SC 107	15.290	24.607	SC 28 near Mountain Rest	NC 107 at the North Carolina state line near Salem	1940	current	
SC 108	—	—	SC 100 southwest of Cheraw	SC 9 in Cheraw	1940	1947	
SC 109	14.520	23.368	SC 145 / Hartsville–Ruby Road in Campbell Crossroads	NC 109 at the North Carolina state line near Mount Croghan	c. 1935	current	
SC 110	—	—	US 221 in Chesnee	NC 741 at the North Carolina state line near Chesnee	1931	1942	First form
SC 110	9.280	14.935	US 29 in Cowpens	US 221 Alt. / SC 11 near Chesnee	1942	current	Second form
SC 111	—	—	US 29 in Gaffney	NC 18 at the North Carolina state line northeast of Gaffney	c. 1928	1938	First form
SC 111	—	—	SC 113 in Gilbert	SC 386 in Ridge Crossroads	1940	1947	Second form
SC 112	—	—	SC 9 in New Prospect	US 221 / SC 110 in Chesnee	1936	1939	First form
SC 112	—	—	SC 215 / SC 215 Alt. in Carlisle	SC 115 in Mean Crossroads	1940	1947	Second form
SC 113	13.610	21.903	SC 394 / South Dixie Road west of Salley	US 178 / Calks Ferry Road in Fairview Crossroads	1937	current	
SC 114	6.360	10.235	SC 18 north of Bonham	SC 18 / Jerusalem Road northeast of Jonesville	1939	current	
SC 115	—	—	US 176 in West Springs	SC 9 in Jonesville	1939	1947	
SC 116	—	—	US 1 in Leesville	SC 113 near Gilbert	1940	1947	
SC 116	3.400	5.472	Laurel Bay Road / Joe Frazier Road in Laurel Bay	US 21 / Geiger Boulevard at Marine Corps Air Station Beaufort on the Burton–Beaufort line	1961	current	
SC 117	—	—	SC 605 near Orangeburg	SC 235 near Fort Motte	1940	1947	
SC 118	—	—	US 1 near Camden	US 1 in Cassatt	1940	1947	First form
SC 118	13.180	21.211	SC 19 Truck / SC 302 in Aiken	US 78 Truck / SC 4 / SC 302 east of Aiken	1974	current	Second form; signed as a beltway around Aiken, but is only official on alignment shown
SC 119	—	—	SC 11 northwest of Gaffney	North Carolina state line northeast of Chesnee	1942	1947	First form
SC 119	5.990	9.640	SR 119 at the Georgia state line near Garnett	US 321 in Garnett	1960	current	Second form
SC 120	17.390	27.986	SC 261 in Pinewood	US 76 / US 378 in Sumter	1942	current	
SC 121	—	—	SC 27 in Aiken	SC 12 in West Columbia	c. 1926	1928	First form
SC 121	—	—	SC 362 northeast of Ehrhardt	SC 6 in Vance	1929	1964	Second form
SC 121	134.200	215.974	US 1 / US 25 / US 78 / US 278 / SR 10 / SR 121 at the Georgia state line south of North Augusta	US 21 / SC 322 in Rock Hill	1964	current	Third form; northern part of a multi-state highway that also exists in Florida and Georgia
SC 122	—	—	SC 2 in Cayce	US 1 / US 21 / SC 2 / SC 5 / SC 43 / SC 215 in West Columbia	1942	1947	First form
SC 122	5.740	9.238	SC 72 / South Elizabeth Lane in Rock Hill	Waterford Park Drive in Rock Hill	1975	current	Second form
SC 123	—	—	SC 13 near Madison	SC 183 near Madison	1942	1947	
SC 124	—	—	US 1 / US 76 in Columbia	US in Dentsville	1942	1947	First form
SC 124	5.630	9.061	US 123 north of Powdersville	South Main Street in Greenville	c. 1969	current	Second form
SC 125	56.212	90.464	US 278 / US 301 in Allendale	US 25 Bus. / SC 125 Truck in North Augusta	1936	current	
SC 126	4.200	6.759	US 25 / SC 121 / Elizabeth Avenue in Belvedere	SC 421 in Clearwater	1937	current	
SC 127	—	—	SC 9 in White Stone	US 29 near Converse	1942	1947	First form
SC 127	3.620	5.826	US 221 / US 221 Truck south of Laurens	US 76 / US 76 Bus. / US 221 Truck in Laurens	c. 1967	current	Second form; completely concurrent with US 221 Truck
SC 128	—	—	SC 170 in Old House	SC 28 in Almeda	1940	1966	First form
SC 128	2.110	3.396	SC 170 in Port Royal	US 21 in Port Royal	2012	current	Second form
SC 129	4.970	7.998	Falling Creek Road east of Wellford	US 29 / SC 292 / Locust Street in Lyman	1962	current	
SC 130	30.072	48.396	SC 59 in Seneca	NC 281 at the North Carolina state line near Salem	c. 1937	current	
SC 131	—	—	US 76 / SC 13 / SC 24 in Seneca	SC 289 in Calhoun	c. 1937	1947	
SC 132	—	—	SC 13 in Greenville	US 25 Alt. north of Greenville	1937	1947	First form
SC 132	—	—	US 321 near Chester	SC 72 / SC 72 Bus. / SC 121 SC 121 Bus. northeast of Chester	c. 1975	c. 1981	Second form
SC 133	20.540	33.056	US 76 / US 123 / SC 28 in Clemson	SC 11 in Keowee-Toxaway State Park near Salem	1937	current	
SC 134	—	—	US 76 / SC 13 / SC 28 in Seneca	SC 183 northeast of West Union	1938	1947	
SC 135	20.920	33.667	US 178 near Liberty	SC 9 south of Pumpkintown	1939	current	
SC 136	—	—	SC 133 in Calhoun	SC 13 in Calhoun	1940	1947	
SC 137	8.410	13.535	SC 93 in Norris	SC 183 near Six Mile	1940	current	
SC 138	—	—	SC 182 near Oakway	US 76 / SC 13 in Westminster	1940	1947	
SC 139	—	—	US 76 / SC 13 / SC 28 northeast of Seneca SC 133 near Calhoun	Oconee–Pickens county line northeast of Seneca SC 88 southeast of Central	1940	1953	
SC 140	—	—	US 15 in Hartsville	Darlington–Chesterfield county line northwest of Hartsville	1942	1947	
SC 141	—	—	US 76 near Horrell Hill	SC 262 near Horrell Hill	1942	1947	
SC 145	—	—	SC 644 near Walterboro	US 15 near Walterboro	1942	1946	First form
SC 145	26.150	42.084	US 1 near McBee	NC 145 at the North Carolina state line near Chesterfield	1961	current	Second form
SC 146	33.447	53.828	US 276 in Greenville	SC 56 in Cross Anchor	1942	current	
SC 147	—	—	US 1 in McBee	SC 151 in Pine Ridge	1942	1947	
SC 149	—	—	SC 102 near Hartsville	US 15 north of Dovesville	1942	1947	
SC 150	33.580	54.042	SC 56 near Glenn Springs	NC 150 at the North Carolina state line near Gaffney	1940	current	
SC 151	—	—	SC 15 in Anderson	SC 20 in Williamston	c. 1926	1929	First form
SC 151	52.850	85.054	US 52 Bus. / SC 34 in Darlington	US 601 / SC 151 Bus. in Pageland	1938	current	Second form
SC 152	—	—	SC 15 / SC 20 in Belton	SC 21 in Ware Place	1926	1929	First form
SC 152	—	—	SC 121 east of Bowman	US 178 / SC 2 near Dorchester	1937	1947	Second form
SC 153	—	—	SC 344 southwest of Lucknow SC 341 near Lucknow	SC 348 in Lucknow SC 151 west of Hartsville	1940	1947	First form
SC 153	11.510	18.524	Brown Road / Old Cleveland Street north of Golden Grove	Saluda Dam Road northeast of Easley	1974	current	Second form
SC 154	16.680	26.844	US 76 / Mayes Open Road in Mayesville	US 15 in Bishopville	1939	current	
SC 155	—	—	SC 34 / SC 151 west of Darlington	Carolina Avenue / Floyds Road in Auburn	1940	1947	
SC 156	—	—	Fields Bridge Road near Cypress Crossroads	SC 153 in Ashland	1940	1947	
SC 157	—	—	SC 151 southwest of Angelus	Angelus	1940	1942	First form
SC 157	10.210	16.431	SC 157 Truck / SC 341 / SC 341 Truck in Kershaw	SC 346 near Catarrh	1942	current	Second form
SC 158	—	—	Rimini	SC 260 in Jordan	1940	1947	
SC 159	—	—	Sandy Grove Church Road in Cypress Crossroads	US 15 / SC 34 near Alcot	1940	1947	
SC 160	11.040	17.767	NC 160 at the North Carolina state line northwest of Fort Mill	US 521 in Indian Land	1942	current	
SC 161	—	—	SC 16 in Eau Claire	US 176 / SC 19 in Union	1923	1928	First form
SC 161	28.910	46.526	US 21 / Cel-River Road in Rock Hill	NC 161 at the North Carolina state line northeast of Clover	c. 1929	current	Second form
SC 162	13.540	21.791	SC 174 in Adams Run	US 17 in Rantowles	1942	current	
SC 163	—	—	SC 16 in York	North Carolina state line in Lake Wylie	c. 1926	1938	
SC 164	2.500	4.023	SC 174 / Willtown Road near Hollywood	SC 162 in Hollywood	1942	current	
SC 165	28.393	45.694	Dead end on Yonges Island in Meggett	US 17 Alt. / US 17 Alt. Truck / Old Light Road in Summerville	1940	current	
SC 166	—	—	US 21 near Yemassee	US 17 near Hendersonville	1942	1947	
SC 167	—	—	SC 11 northwest of Gaffney	North Carolina state line near Gaffney	1942	1947	
SC 169	—	—	SC 170 north of Bluffton	Near Chelsea	1940	1946	
SC 170	49.010	78.874	SR 25 at the Georgia state line southwest of Limehouse	U.S. Route 21 Bus. / Polk Street in Beaufort	1931	current	
SC 171	—	—	SC 261 in Greeleyville	US 521 in Bryans Crossroads	1930	1949	First form
SC 171	12.560	20.213	Arctic Avenue in Folly Beach	SC 7 in Charleston	1956	current	Second form
SC 171Y	—	—	SC 171 in Greeleyville	Holliman Road near Greeleyville	c. 1940	1942	
SC 172	—	—	US 17 / US 701 in Whitehall Terrace	Clements Ferry Road in Cainhoy	1937	1940	First form
SC 172	9.000	14.484	US 178 near North	SC 6 near St. Matthews	1940	current	Second form
SC 173	—	—	SC 27 in Ridgeville	US 78 / SC 2 near Ridgeville	1936	1940	First form
SC 173	1.570	2.527	SC 27 / School Street in Ridgeville	US 78 / Myers–Mayo Road near Ridgeville	1940	current	Second form
SC 174	25.730	41.408	Yacht Club Road / Dock Site Road in Edisto Beach	US 17 in Osborn	1936	current	Signed to begin at Dock Site Road / Buoy Road in Edisto Beach
SC 175	—	—	US 301 in Sardinia Sumter–Williamsburg county line northwest of Kingstree	SC 54 northwest of Sardinia SC 38 southeast of Marion	1928	1952	
SC 177	—	—	US 176 / US 221 in Spartanburg	NC 192 at the North Carolina state line near Fingerville	1933	1935	First form
SC 177	—	—	US 176 near Newberry	US 76 / SC 2 east of Ballentine	1936	1951	Second form
SC 177	7.820	12.585	SC 9 / Delta Plant Road in Wallace	NC 177 at the North Carolina state line near Wallace	1961	current	Third form
SC 178	—	—	US 17 near Moncks Corner	Berkeley–Charleston county line near Honey Hill	1928	1933	
SC 179	—	—	US 52 near Moncks Corner	McClellanville	1933	1950	First form
SC 179	0.670	1.078	US 17 / Graystone Boulevard in Little River	NC 179 at the North Carolina state line near Little River	1980	current	Second form
SC 180	—	—	US 29 in Blacksburg	North Carolina state line near Blacksburg	1942	1947	
SC 181	—	—	West Pine Grove Road in Fair Play	US 76 / SC 13 / SC 28 in Seneca	1923	1942	First form
SC 181	6.430	10.348	SR 181 at the Georgia state line southwest of Starr	SC 412 in Starr	1942	current	Second form
SC 182	9.580	15.418	SC 59 / SC 243 in Fair Play	SC 24 in Oakway	c. 1925	current	
SC 183	53.712	86.441	US 76 / US 123 in Westminster	US 123 in Greenville	c. 1926	current	
SC 184	34.610	55.699	SR 368 at the Georgia state line southwest of Iva	SC 252 Lower Shady Grove Road northwest of Ware Shoals	c. 1925	current	
SC 185	26.920	43.324	US 178 southwest of Hodges	SC 28 southeast of Homeland Park	1938	current	
SC 186	14.960	24.076	SC 8 northeast of Pickens	US 276 in Slater-Marietta	1939	current	
SC 187	30.334	48.818	SC 184 southwest of Iva	US 76 / SC 28 south of Pendleton	1940	current	
SC 188	—	—	SC 184 east of Antreville	US 178 / SC 20 near Honea Path	1940	1947	First form
SC 188	8.250	13.277	SC 28 / Bountyland Road northwest of Seneca	SC 183 northeast of Walhalla	1971	current	Second form
SC 190	—	—	SC 39 near Chappells	Old Cherokee Road near Silverstreet	c. 1941	1947	
SC 191	21.930	35.293	SC 421 / Howlandville Road in Warrenville	SC 121 / Hill Top Drive in Johnston	1936	current	
SC 192	—	—	US 76 / SC 2 near Newberry	US 76 / SC 2 north of Newberry	c. 1928	1947	
SC 193	6.930	11.153	SC 23 / Mt. Alpha Road in Ward	SC 121 / Gabe Road near Saluda	1937	current	
SC 194	14.690	23.641	US 178 Conn. / US 378 in Saluda	SC 391 near Stoney Hill	1939	current	
SC 195	—	—	SC 43 near Saluda	SC 194 northeast of Saluda	1942	1947	
SC 196	—	—	SC 19 in Trenton	SC 23 southwest of Johnston	1940	1947	
SC 197	—	—	SC 19 north of Johnston	US 178 near Saluda	1940	1947	
SC 198	2.660	4.281	I-85 / SC 5 in Blacksburg	NC 198 at the North Carolina state line north of Blacksburg	1940	current	
SC 199	—	—	SC 19 near Aiken	US 1 near Aiken	1940	1947	
SC 200	42.780	68.848	US 321 / SC 34 in Winnsboro	NC 200 at the North Carolina state line near Lancaster	1938	current	
SC 201	12.550	20.197	SC 20 north of Abbeville	SC 284 / Level Land Road near Antreville	1939	current	
SC 202	4.520	7.274	US 76 in Little Mountain	US 176 southeast of Pomaria	1939	current	
SC 203	7.750	12.472	SC 20 / Trinity Street in Abbeville	SC 185 southeast of Arborville	1940	current	
SC 204	—	—	US 78 near Reevesville	SC 152 northwest of Rosinville	1940	1947	
SC 205	—	—	SC 391 in Prosperity	Lexington–Richland county line northeast of Chapin	1940	1947	
SC 206	—	—	SC 525 in North Charleston	Yeamans Hall Club in Hanahan	1940	1947	
SC 207	9.168	14.754	US 601 / SC 9 in Pageland	NC 207 at the North Carolina state line near Pageland	1940	current	
SC 208	—	—	Orangeburg–Dorchester county line west of Reevesville	SC 204 west of Reevesville	1942	1947	
SC 209	—	—	US 21 in Lobeco	Witsell Road / Porches Hill Road in Dale	1942	1947	
SC 210	—	—	US 301 in Orangeburg	US 21 / SC 2 in Sandy Run	1936	1950	First form
SC 210	28.580	45.995	US 21 in Branchville	SC 6 in Vance	1964	current	Second form
SC 211	—	—	SC 21 in Travelers Rest	North Carolina state line in Caesars Head State Park near Cleveland	c. 1925	1928	First form
SC 211	—	—	North Carolina state line northwest of Fort Mill	US 521 in Indian Land	1928	1942	Second form
SC 211	27.380	44.064	SC 150 northeast of Pacolet	SC 49 in Sharon	1942	current	Third form
SC 212	5.670	9.125	SC 64 northwest of Bells Crossroads	US 21 east of Williams	1937	current	
SC 213	21.380	34.408	US 176 / Parr Road near Peak	US 321 / US 321 Bus. / SC 34 southwest of Winnsboro Mills	1939	current	
SC 214	—	—	SC 280 in Port Royal	US 21 in Burton	1940	1947	
SC 215	96.330	155.028	US 21 / US 321 in Columbia	SC 295 / SC 296 in Spartanburg	1928	current	
SC 216	—	—	US 21 northwest of Sheldon	US 21 in Sheldon	1939	1947	First form
SC 216	1.220	1.963	Battleground Road at Kings Mountain National Military Park near Blacksburg	NC 216 at the North Carolina state line northeast of Blacksburg	1960	current	Second form
SC 217	15.390	24.768	SC 64 in Lodge	SC 61 northwest of Canadys	1936	current	
SC 218	—	—	US 21 / SC 5 northeast of Eau Claire	US 21 / SC 219 southwest of Winnsboro Mills	1939	1950	
SC 219	9.030	14.532	US 76 / SC 34 in Newberry	US 176 northwest of Pomaria	1937	current	
SC 220	—	—	SC 605 near St. Matthews	SC 6 west of St. Matthews	1940	1947	
SC 222	—	—	SC 22 southeast of Blair	SC 215 near Blair	1938	1947	
SC 223	—	—	SC 22 near Mitford	Fairfield–Chester county line near Mitford	1939	1940	First form
SC 223	6.740	10.847	SC 9 / SC 901 north of Richburg	US 21 / W.D. Hattie Lane in Landsford	1940	current	Second form
SC 224	—	—	SC 269 near Rion	SC 34 west of Longtown	1940	1947	
SC 225	—	—	SC 39 near Ware Shoals	SC 39 in Cross Hill	1940	1947	First form
SC 225	5.900	9.495	US 25 / US 178 near Greenwood	SC 72 Bus. / Calhoun Road west of Greenwood	1973	current	Second form
SC 226	—	—	US 21 in White Oak	Near White Oak	1940	1947	
SC 227	—	—	US 21 in Adger	SC 704 northwest of Blackstock	1940	1947	
SC 228	—	—	US 276 / SC 2 in Barksdale	US 221 near Ora	1940	1947	
SC 229	—	—	SC 227 near Blackstock	SC 901 southwest of Mitford	1942	1947	
SC 230	20.730	33.362	US 25 / SC 121 / SC 125 in North Augusta	SC 25 in West Store Crossroads	1939	current	Signage and SCDOT reference indicates the southern terminus is at US 25 / SC 121 (Knox Avenue), also in North Augusta.
SC 231	—	—	SC 430 northwest of Johnston	US 1 near Ridge Spring	1940	1947	
SC 232	—	—	SC 397 southwest of Ridge Spring	SC 23 / SC 39 in Ridge Spring	1940	1947	
SC 233	—	—	SC 231 near Ward	SC 193 near Ward	1940	1947	
SC 234	—	—	SC 23 in Ward	SC 434 near Batesburg	1940	1947	
SC 235	—	—	SC 6 / SC 210 near Wolfton	SC 267 in Fort Motte	1940	1947	
SC 236	—	—	SC 117 near St. Matthews	SC 235 near St. Matthews	1942	1947	
SC 237	—	—	SC 404 near Johnston	SC 19 in Johnston	1942	1947	
SC 238	—	—	Aiken–Edgefield county line southeast of Ridge Spring	SC 23 / SC 39 in Ridge Spring	1942	1947	
SC 239	—	—	SC 235 near Hammond Crossroads	US 21 / SC 2 southwest of Hammond Crossroads	1942	1947	
SC 240	—	—	US 15 near Rosinville	US 178 / SC 2 southeast of Rosinville	c. 1944	1947	
SC 241	—	—	Edgefield–Greenwood county line south of Pittsburg	SC 246 south east of Ninety Six	1942	1947	
SC 242	—	—	SC 243 near Fair Play	SC 24 / SC 181 near Oakway	1940	1947	
SC 243	8.380	13.486	SC 59 / SC 182 in Fair Play	I-85 / SC 24 southeast of Townville	1940	current	
SC 244	—	—	SC 24 in Townville	US 76 / SC 13 / SC 28 in Seneca	1940	1947	
SC 245	5.060	8.143	US 178 in Kneece	SC 391 / Lodestar Road north of Batesburg–Leesville	1929	current	
SC 246	28.700	46.188	US 178 in Friendship	US 178 in Hodges	1929	current	
SC 247	10.700	17.220	SC 20 / Breazeale Street in Belton	US 25 in Ware Place	1929	current	
SC 248	—	—	US 29 in Anderson	SC 20 in Williamston	1929	1935	First form
SC 248	6.170	9.930	US 178 in Epworth	SC 34 / SC 246 in Ninety Six	1940	current	Second form
SC 249	—	—	SC 80 near Anderson	US 76 / US 178 / SC 28	1940	1947	
SC 250	—	—	US 25 in Donaldson	US 276 near Marietta	c. 1937	c. 1968	
SC 251	—	—	US 25 near Cleveland	Mountain Page Road at the North Carolina state line northeast of Cleveland	c. 1937	1947	
SC 252	35.711	57.471	US 76 / US 178 southeast of Anderson	US 76 west of Laurens	1938	current	
SC 253	19.656	31.633	SC 124 in Parker	SC 414 / North Tigerville Road in Tigerville	1939	current	
SC 254	8.230	13.245	SC 72 Bus. in Greenwood	US 25 northwest of Cokesbury	1940	current	
SC 255	—	—	US 29 / SC 250 in Gantt	US 25 in Greenville	1939	c. 1949	
SC 256	—	—	US 178 / SC 20 in Donalds	SC 252 northwest of Ware Shoals	1940	1947	
SC 257	—	—	SC 201 southwest of Due West	SC 284 nea Honea Path	1942	1956	Two instances: 1942 to 1947 and 1950 to 1956
SC 258	—	—	US 521 in Alcolu	Brogdon Road north of Alcolu	1940	1947	
SC 259	—	—	US 25 northwest of Bath	US 1 / US 78 west of Aiken	1942	1947	
SC 260	12.520	20.149	Santee Dam in Eagle Point	SC 261 in Manning	1939	current	
SC 261	116.960	188.229	US 701 in Yauhannah	US 521 south of Camden	1923	current	
SC 262	14.750	23.738	US 76 / US 378 / Veterans Road in Columbia	US 601 / Westvaco Road in Leesburg	1938	current	
SC 263	5.250	8.449	SC 764 in Eastover	US 76 / US 378 near Eastover	1937	current	
SC 264	—	—	SC 26 near Fort Motte	Lone Star Road in Lone Star	1939	1940	First form
SC 264	—	—	US 321 in Bowling Green	SC 557 west of Lake Wylie	1940	1947	Second form
SC 265	24.690	39.735	US 601 near Kershaw	SC 9 southeast of Ruby	1926	current	
SC 266	—	—	SC 260 west of Bloomville	Great Savannah Church Road southeast of Jordan	1939	1947	
SC 267	23.200	37.337	US 15 near Santee	US 601 / Adams Road near Wiles Crossroads	1940	current	
SC 268	5.630	9.061	SC 265 / Steen Road southwest of Ruby	SC 9 / SC 109 in Mount Croghan	1940	current	
SC 269	11.950	19.232	SC 215 west of Blythewood	US 321 south of Winnsboro Mills	1942	current	
SC 270	—	—	US 1 in Blaney	SC 213 near Blaney	1942	1947	
SC 271	—	—	US 76 northwest of Westminster	SC 288 in Salem	1942	1971	
SC 272	—	—	SC 185 west of Due West	SC 256 in Donalds	1942	1947	
SC 273	—	—	SC 96 in Tradesville	SC 207 south of Wolf Pond Cross Roads	1942	1947	
SC 274	17.537	28.223	NC 274 at the North Carolina state line northwest of Lake Wylie	SC 322 in Rock Hill	1938	current	
SC 275	—	—	SC 905 in Red Bluff Crossroads	SC 9 in Loris	1942	1947	
SC 277	—	—	SC 215 southwest of Blythewood	SC 218 southwest of Blythewood	1942	1947	First form
SC 277	8.140	13.100	US 76 in Columbia	I-77 in Dentsville	1976	current	Second form
SC 278	—	—	Southeast of Chappells	SC 19 near Chappells	1942	1947	
SC 279	—	—	SC 154 near St. Charles	SC 34 southeast of Antioch	1942	1947	
SC 280	—	—	SC 281 / Parris Island access road in Port Royal	US 21 in Burton	c. 1929	2012	
SC 281	—	—	SC 28 near Ellenton	SC 37 in Barnwell	c. 1925	1926	First form
SC 281	3.190	5.134	US 21 in Port Royal	US 21 Bus. in Beaufort	c. 1928	current	Second form
SC 282	—	—	SC 28 northwest of Millett	SC 28 northeast of Millett	1939	1947	
SC 283	17.840	28.711	US 221 / SC 28 / Collier Street in Plum Branch	US 25 northwest of Edgefield	1939	current	
SC 284	—	—	SC 81 / Tom Young Bridge Road southeast of Lowndesville	SC 28 / SC 184 east of Antreville	1928	1932	First form
SC 284	19.590	31.527	SC 81 / Tom Young Bridge Road southeast of Lowndesville	SC 28 / SC 184 east of Antreville	1940	current	Second form
SC 285	—	—	US 21 / SC 281 in Beaufort	Hunting Island	1939	1954	
SC 286	—	—	SC 367 southwest of Early Branch	SC 32 northeast of Sheldon	1940	1947	
SC 287	—	—	SC 82 in Mount Carmel	SC 432 near Troy	1940	1947	
SC 288	15.260	24.559	US 178 / SC 11 near Sunset	US 276 in Slater-Marietta	1940	current	
SC 289	—	—	US 76 / SC 28 in Calhoun	Clemson College in Calhoun	1940	1947	
SC 290	30.582	49.217	US 25 east of Slater-Marietta	US 221 in Moore	c. 1937	current	
SC 291	11.400	18.347	US 25 / White Horse Road Extension in Gantt	SC 253 east of Sans Souci	1939	current	Signed to end at US 276 / SC 253 in Sans Souci
SC 292	13.640	21.951	SC 290 in Duncan	SC 9 northwest of Boiling Springs	1939	current	
SC 293	—	—	US 29 northeast of Blacksburg	Battleground Road northeast of Blacksburg	1940	1947	
SC 294	—	—	US 29 in Golden Grove	US 25 southeast of Gantt	1940	1947	
SC 295	16.700	26.876	US 176 / SC 9 west of Pacolet	I-85 Bus. / New Cut Road in Southern Shops	1940	current	
SC 296	21.803	35.089	SC 14 in Five Forks	US 29 in Spartanburg	1940	current	
SC 297	—	—	US 76 / US 178 east of Anderson	US 29 near Anderson	1942	1947	
SC 298	—	—	Cherokee Falls	US 29 southwest of Blacksburg	1942	1947	
SC 299	—	—	US 29 in Spartanburg South Green River Road near Macedonia	SC 110 north of Cowpens SC 11 in Gaffney	1942	1947	
SC 300	11.460	18.443	US 278 south of Barnwell	US 301 in Ulmer	1940	current	
SC 301	—	—	SC 30 northeast of Salkehatchie	SC 6 / SC 64 southwest of Ruffin	c. 1926	1928	First form
SC 301	—	—	US 76 in Timmonsville	SC 30 in Lees Crossroads	1928	1932	Second form
SC 302	—	—	SC 763 in Oswego	US 15 Alt. in Dubose Crossroads	1929	1947	First form
SC 302	66.200	106.539	SC 125 south of Spiderweb	US 21 / US 176 / US 321 in West Columbia	1973	current	Second form
SC 303	13.515	21.750	US 17 near Green Pond	US 17 Alt. / SC 63 in Walterboro	1929	current	
SC 304	5.880	9.463	Main Street in Hilda	US 78 Bus. in Blackville	1939	current	
SC 305	—	—	US 76 / US 301 in Florence	Fore Road northeast of Florence	1939	1947	
SC 306	—	—	Moses Dingle Road in Davis Station	US 301 northeast of Summerton	1939	1947	
SC 307	—	—	SC 3 north of Allendale	SC 508 southwest of Ulmer	1942	1947	
SC 308	10.990	17.687	US 221 in Ora	SC 56 Bus. / SC 72 Bus. in Clinton	1940	current	
SC 309	—	—	SC 341 northwest of Lake City	SC 53 / SC 53 Alt. in Hobbs Crossroads	1940	1968	
SC 310	8.500	13.679	US 176 / SC 453 Truck in Holly Hill	SC 6 near Vance	1939	current	
SC 311	9.250	14.886	US 176 in Sandridge	SC 6 near Cross	c. 1926	current	
SC 312	—	—	SC 3 in Kline	SC 300 near Kline	1942	1947	
SC 313	—	—	SC 39 northeast of Williston	SC 390 near Williston	1942	1947	
SC 314	2.610	4.200	US 15 west of Holly Hill	US 176 northwest of Holly Hill	1938	current	
SC 315	—	—	SC 4 near Wilkinson Heights	SC 47 in Elloree	1940	1947	First form
SC 315	6.067	9.764	US 17 near Levy	SC 170 near Levy	2013	current	Second form
SC 316	—	—	SC 315 west of Elloree	SC 33 near Creston	1942	1947	
SC 317	—	—	Lexington–Calhoun county line near Gaston	US 21 / SC 2 northwest of Sandy Run	1942	1947	First form
SC 317	—	—	US 501 in Myrtle Beach	US 17 northeast of Myrtle Beach	1975	1981	Second form
SC 318	—	—	SC 233 west of Ward	SC 193 northwest of Ward	1942	1947	
SC 319	13.210	21.259	US 701 in Homewood	US 501 / St. John Road in Aynor	1951	current	
SC 320	—	—	SC 303 in Green Pond	SC 32 in Green Pond	1933	1947	
SC 321	—	—	SC 32 in Green Pond	US 17 in Walterboro	c. 1926	1929	
SC 322	28.050	45.142	SC 49 near Pinckneyville	US 21 in Rock Hill	1936	current	
SC 323	—	—	Bennetts Point	SC 32 near Green Pond	1940	1947	
SC 324	13.880	22.338	SC 5 Bus. / SC 161 Bus. in York	SC 72 / SC 121 near Rock Hill	1940	current	
SC 325	—	—	SC 907 northwest of Chester	US 321 / SC 909 in Lowrys	1942	1947	
SC 326	—	—	South of Jacksonboro	US 17 in Jacksonboro	1942	1947	
SC 327	22.623	36.408	US 52 / US 301 in Effingham	I-95 northeast of Quinby	1942	current	
SC 328	—	—	Dan Sexton Road southeast of Sharon	US 321 south of York	1942	1947	
SC 329	—	—	SC 177 near Peak	SC 22 near Glymphville	1942	1947	First form
SC 329	6.350	10.219	SC 105 / McKown's Mountain Road southeast of Gaffney	SC 18 northeast of East Gaffney	1982	current	Second form
SC 330	—	—	SC 5 northeast of Ulmer	SC 641 near Ehrhardt	1942	1947	
SC 331	—	—	SR 73 at the Georgia state line southwest of Allendale	SC 5 in Sycamore	c. 1926	1942	First form
SC 331	—	—	SC 631 southwest of Barton	SC 361 west of Barton	1942	—	Second form
SC 332	18.070	29.081	SC 4 east of Springfield	US 301 / US 601 southeast of Cope	c. 1929	current	
SC 333	3.340	5.375	US 321 / Daley Road in Scotia	US 601 / Town Hall Avenue in Furman	1939	current	
SC 334	—	—	SC 64 southeast of Barnwell	SC 36 / SC 364 in Ehrhardt	1940	1947	
SC 335	—	—	SC 361 east of Barton	SC 361 near Miley	1939	1947	
SC 336	13.590	21.871	US 321 / Sand Hills Road in Tillman	SC 462 in Old House	1939	current	
SC 337	—	—	SC 631 near Barton	SC 28 in Allendale	1940	1947	
SC 338	—	—	SC 28 in Brunson	SC 335 northeast of Brunson	1940	1947	
SC 339	—	—	SC 5 in Tarboro	SC 336 in Ridgeland	1940	1947	
SC 340	10.990	17.687	SC 403 near Timmonsville	SC 34 / SC 151 in Darlington	1940	current	
SC 341	93.870	151.069	SC 41 / SC 51 in Johnsonville	US 521 Bus. / US 601 in Kershaw	1923	current	
SC 342	—	—	SC 155 in Lewis Crossroads	SC 34 / SC 340 in Darlington	1940	1947	
SC 343	—	—	SC 305 in Florence	SC 34 in Mechanicsville	1940	1947	
SC 344	—	—	SC 34 near Camden	SC 34 northwest of Bishopville	1940	1947	
SC 345	—	—	SC 34 west of Dillon	North Carolina state line northeast of Little Rock	1940	1947	
SC 346	12.580	20.246	SC 341 in Bethune	SC 903 / Holley Road near Catarrh	1940	current	
SC 347	—	—	Sumter–Lee county line southeast of Mayesville	SC 763 in Elliott	1940	1942	
SC 348	—	—	SC 344 in Zemp	Lucknow Road in Lucknow	1940	1947	
SC 349	—	—	SC 34 near Lees Crossroads	SC 151 southeast of Hartsville	1942	1947	
SC 350	—	—	US 178 in Black	US 25 near Ware Shoals	1942	1947	
SC 351	—	—	SC 34 in Lydia	SC 35 in Hartsville	1923	c. 1925	First form
SC 351	—	—	SC 9 northwest of Richburg	US 21 east of Lowrys	1942	1947	Second form
SC 352	—	—	SC 34 in Antioch	SC 34 near Antioch	1942	1947	
SC 353	—	—	US 521 in Shamokin	SC 341 near Mount Pisgah	1942	1947	
SC 354	—	—	SC 260 southeast of Lakewood	US 521 west of Brogdon	1942	1947	
SC 355	—	—	US 176 in Buffalo	SC 115 northwest of Buffalo	1942	1947	
SC 356	—	—	SC 34 northeast of Bingham	SC 9 near Manning Crossroads	1942	1947	
SC 357	15.040	24.205	SC 101 / SC 290 in Greer	US 176 in Campobello	1950	current	
SC 358	3.330	5.359	SC 357 northwest of Lyman	SC 129 / SC 292 in Lyman	1950	current	
SC 359	—	—	SC 334 in Govan	US 78 in Bamberg	1942	1947	
SC 360	—	—	SC 36 near Rowesville	SC 42 southwest of Orangeburg	1942	1947	
SC 361	—	—	SC 337 near Barton	SC 63 near Miley	1936	1947	
SC 362	23.060	37.111	SC 212 in Williams	US 78 in Bamberg	1939	current	
SC 363	13.270	21.356	US 321 north of Luray	SC 63 northeast of Varnville	1940	current	
SC 364	—	—	SC 330 near Ehrhardt	SC 362 near Lodge	1940	1947	
SC 365	—	—	SC 128 in Horsegall	SC 28 northwest of Cummings	1940	1947	
SC 366	—	—	SC 367 northwest of Gillisonville	US 17 in Coosawhatchie	1940	1947	
SC 367	—	—	SC 369 northeast of Robertville	US 17 Alt. in Yemassee	1940	1947	
SC 368	—	—	US 17 in Switzerland	SC 170 near Coosawhatchie	1940	1947	
SC 369	—	—	SC 5 in Robertville	SC 374 near Pineland	c. 1946	1947	
SC 370	—	—	SC 3 north of Blackville	SC 37 near Springfield	1942	1947	
SC 371	—	—	SC 70 in Barnwell	Ashleigh Road near Ashleigh	1942	1947	
SC 372	—	—	SC 194 southwest of Stoney Hill	Saluda River southwest of Stoney Hill	1942	1947	
SC 373	—	—	SC 39 near Snelling	SC 70 near Snelling	1942	1947	
SC 374	—	—	SC 367 northeast of Pineland	Jasper–Hampton county line near Pineland	c. 1946	1947	
SC 375	9.330	15.015	SC 377 near Lane	US 521 in Greeleyville	1949	current	
SC 376	—	—	SC 763 in Sumter	US 76 / US 521 in Sumter	1942	1947	
SC 377	14.560	23.432	SC 375 near Lane	SC 261 in Kingstree	1949	current	
SC 380	—	—	US 501 near Sellers	SC 38 west of Latta	1942	1952	
SC 381	22.700	36.532	SC 38 in Blenheim	NC 381 at the North Carolina state line near Boykin	1929	current	
SC 382	—	—	SC 38 near Drake	SC 38 in Bennettsville	1940	1947	
SC 383	—	—	SC 9 northwest of Bennettsville	SC 38 near Bennettsville	c. 1936	1970	
SC 384	—	—	SC 79 in Breeden	North Carolina state line southeast of Fletcher	1939	1947	
SC 385	—	—	SC 341 near Bishopville	US 15 / SC 34 in Una	1942	1947	First form
SC 385	11.730	18.878	US 15 / US 401 southwest of Bennettsville	SC 79 near Boykin	1970	current	Second form
SC 386	—	—	Saluda–Lexington county line north of Leesville	SC 43 northeast of Leesville	1942	1947	
SC 387	—	—	SC 38 in Monroe Crossroads	SC 381 in Five Forks	1942	1947	
SC 388	—	—	SC 34 near Brownsville	SC 38 in Bristow	1942	1947	
SC 389	13.730	22.096	US 321 in Neeses	SC 39 in Perry	1942	current	
SC 390	—	—	SC 64 in Snelling	SC 394 west of Salley	1939	1947	
SC 391	34.920	56.198	SC 39 in Jones Crossroads	US 76 in Prosperity	1923	current	
SC 392	3.620	5.826	US 1 near Ridge Spring	SC 23 / SC 39 in Ridge Spring	c. 1926	current	
SC 393	—	—	SC 39 in Perry	SC 1 near Woodford	c. 1926	1947	
SC 394	22.370	36.001	SC 4 near Windsor	US 178 west of North	1932	current	
SC 395	15.140	24.365	SC 194 northeast of Saluda	SC 121 in Newberry	1939	current	
SC 396	—	—	SC 39 in Mountville	Jefferson Davis Road northeast of White Plains Crossroads	1940	1947	
SC 397	—	—	Aiken–Edgefield county line near Ridge Spring	Padgett Pond Road near Monetta	1940	1947	
SC 398	—	—	SC 39 southeast of Saluda	US 178 near Saluda	1942	1947	
SC 399	—	—	SC 234 southeast of Saluda	US 178 east of Saluda	1940	1947	
SC 400	12.440	20.020	US 321 / SC 332 in Norway	SC 4 in Edisto	1942	current	
SC 401	—	—	SC 40 in Mount Pleasant	Isle of Palms	c. 1929	1933	First form
SC 401	—	—	SC 215 in Monticello	SC 22 northwest of Monticello	1942	1947	Second form
SC 402	15.680	25.235	Unnamed access road to US 17 Alt. / US 52 / Turnaround Court northeast of Moncks Corner	SC 41 / Steed Creek Road in Huger	c. 1929	current	According to SCDOT, the access road is part of SC 402, but it is not signed as such.
SC 403	36.480	58.709	SC 341 in Camp Branch	US 15 / SC 34 in Lees Crossroads	1933	current	
SC 404	—	—	SC 191 near Johnston	SC 231 south of Ward	1942	1947	
SC 405	—	—	US 15 south of Hartsville	SC 151 in Flinns Crossroads	1942	1947	
SC 406	—	—	Shelton	SC 215 northeast of Shelton	1942	1947	
SC 407	—	—	SC 403 near Sparrows Crossroads	US 52 / US 301 near Bannockburn	1942	1947	
SC 408	—	—	Clarendon–Williamsburg county line near Lake City	SC 54 / SC 341 in Lake City	1942	1947	
SC 409	—	—	US 221 / SC 72 in Greenwood	SC 225 in Isle of Pines	1942	1947	
SC 410	—	—	US 178 / SC 2 in Bowman	SC 4 near Cameron	1942	1947	First form
SC 410	17.460	28.099	US 701 in Baxter Forks	NC 410 at the North Carolina state line northeast of Jernigans Crossroads	1952	current	Second form
SC 411	—	—	SC 41 in Kingstree	SC 38 near Marion	1924	1928	First form
SC 411	—	—	SC 391 near Delmar	Near Acapulco	1942	1947	Second form
SC 412	—	—	SC 44 southeast of Salters	SC 441 in Kingstree	c. 1926	1928	First form
SC 412	7.030	11.314	US 29 in Holland Store	SC 81 / First Avenue in Starr	1949	current	Second form
SC 413	—	—	SC 41 near Moncks Corner	SC 511 in Jamestown	c. 1926	1928	First form
SC 413	17.190	27.665	SC 184 in Iva	US 76 / US 178 / Rutledge Road southwest of Belton	1949	current	Second form
SC 414	—	—	SC 3 in Sumter	SC 41 in Darlington	1923	1928	First form
SC 414	17.260	27.777	US 276 south of Slater-Marietta	SC 14 east of Highland	1949	current	Second form
SC 415	—	—	SC 101 in Greer	US 25 northwest of Locust Hill	1949	1964	
SC 416	—	—	SC 8 in Pickens	US 29 in Greenville	1949	1956	
SC 417	21.699	34.921	US 276 in Mauldin	SC 296 northeast of Reidville	1949	current	
SC 418	24.740	39.815	US 25 / SC 8 in Ware Place	SC 101 / SC 146 / Carlton Duvall Drive northwest of Woodruff	1949	current	
SC 419	—	—	SC 267 south of Fort Motte	SC 26 southeast of Fort Motte	1950	1952	First form
SC 419	6.510	10.477	SC 267 southeast of Wiles Crossroads	Mosley Road / Fort Motte Road / Town Square Street in Fort Motte	1952	current	Second form
SC 420	4.930	7.934	US 178 / Old Shoals Junction Road in Shoals Junction	US 25 Bus. / SC 252 Truck / Honea Path Street in Ware Shoals	1950	current	
SC 421	10.360	16.673	US 1 / US 78 / US 278 southwest of Clearwater	US 1 / US 78 / Dyches Road in Aiken	1951	current	
SC 430	11.740	18.894	SC 23 / SC 23 Truck east of Edgefield	US 278 / Gold Mine Road near Saluda	1939	current	
SC 431	—	—	SC 43 north of Oak Grove	US 1 in West Columbia	1940	1947	
SC 432	—	—	SC 28 in Parksville Greenwood–McCormick county line northwest of Troy	SC 10 in Troy SC 28 northwest of Troy	1940	1947	
SC 433	—	—	South Main Street in McCormick	SC 283 near Whitetown	1940	1947	
SC 434	—	—	US 178 in Holston Crossroads	SC 43 near Delmar	1940	1947	
SC 435	—	—	US 25 near Pleasant Lane	SC 43 northeast of Pleasant Lane	1942	1947	
SC 436	—	—	US 25 / SC 430 in Edgefield	SC 19 near Saluda	1942	1947	
SC 438	—	—	SC 43 southwest of McCormick	SC 28 in McCormick	1942	1947	
SC 439	—	—	SC 43 southwest of McCormick	SC 28 in Plum Branch	1942	1947	
SC 440	—	—	Rowe Drive near Summerton	SC 158 southeast of Summerton	1942	1947	
SC 441	26.280	42.294	SC 763 / Lynam Road in Millwood	US 15 near Manville	1940	current	
SC 442	—	—	US 15 in Summerton	US 15 north of Summerton	1942	1947	
SC 443	—	—	SC 526 southeast of Camden	SC 44 near Manville	1942	1947	
SC 444	—	—	SC 39 east of Ware Shoals	US 221 in Maddens	1942	1947	
SC 445	—	—	SC 43 in Saluda	SC 194 northeast of Saluda	1942	1947	
SC 450	—	—	US 52 in St. Stephen	SC 45 near Swamp Fox	1940	1947	
SC 451	—	—	US 52 in Bonneau	Near Russellville	1942	1947	
SC 452	—	—	SC 28 in Plum Branch	SC 439 northwest of Plum Branch	1942	1947	
SC 453	14.930	24.028	US 178 in Harleyville	SC 45 in Eutawville	1942	current	
SC 460	—	—	SC 462 east of Bluffton	Hilton Head Island ferry landing west of Hilton Head Island	1943	1947	First form
SC 460	12.473	20.073	SC 160 northeast of Tega Cay	SC 160 in Fort Mill	2012	current	Second form
SC 461	—	—	US 17 / SC 170 in Limehouse	SC 46 near Levy	1940	1947	First form
SC 461	3.710	5.971	SC 61 in Charleston	Bees Ferry Road in Charleston	2011	current	Second form
SC 462	35.920	57.808	US 321 in Robertville	SC 170 near Chelsea	1942	current	
SC 463	—	—	Myrtle Island	SC 46 in Brighton Beach	1942	1947	
SC 464	—	—	SC 46 west of Bluffton	SC 462 near Bluffton	1942	1947	
SC 465	—	—	Southeast of Pritchardville	SC 170 near Pritchardville	1942	1947	
SC 466	—	—	US 521 near Camden	Kershaw–Sumter county line near Spring Hill	1942	1947	
SC 478	—	—	SC 302 in Aiken	SC 421 in Aiken	1974	1987	
SC 490	—	—	US 521 near Fort Mill	North Carolina state line northeast of Tega Cay	1940	1947	
SC 496	1.640	2.639	SC 49 / SC 49 Truck in Union	SC 18 in Union	c. 1986	current	Unsigned
SC 500	—	—	SC 333 in Furman	SC 5 south of Estill	1942	1947	
SC 501	—	—	SC 9 / SC 50 in Cheraw	North Carolina state line near Cheraw	1923	1926	
SC 502	—	—	SC 175 near Kingstree	US 701 near Kensington	1940	1947	
SC 503	—	—	US 501 / US 501 Alt. in Myrtle Beach	US 501 south of Conway	1940	1949	
SC 504	—	—	SC 5 in Roddey	US 521 east of Van Wyck	1940	1960	
SC 505	—	—	SC 2 in Cayce	US 21 / SC 5 / SC 215 in West Columbia	1940	1947	
SC 506	—	—	US 301 / US 501 southwest of Dillon	SC 9 / SC 34 in Dillon	1940	1947	
SC 507	—	—	US 521 near Trio	SC 175 near Kingstree	1940	1947	
SC 508	—	—	SC 331 in Allendale	SC 5 in Ulmer	1940	1947	
SC 510	—	—	SC 90 in Pee Dee Crossroads	SC 917 northeast of Aynor	1940	1947	
SC 511	—	—	US 17 / US 701 in Whitehall Terrace	Northeast of Outland	c. 1926	1952	
SC 512	24.250	39.027	US 52 in Cades	SC 513 near Hopewell	1928	current	
SC 513	8.870	14.275	SC 41 / SC 51 near Hopewell	SC 261 north of Carters Crossroads	1940	current	
SC 514	—	—	US 52 / US 301 south of Florence	US 52 northwest of Florence	1940	1947	
SC 515	—	—	SC 261 in Lane	US 521 northwest of Sampit	1939	1947	
SC 516	—	—	SC 5 north of Fairfax	SC 641 near Jennys	1942	1947	
SC 517	—	—	SC 3 south of Springfield	SC 5 northwest of Denmark	1942	1947	First form
SC 517	3.840	6.180	SC 703 / 14th Avenue in Isle of Palms	US 17 / Greystone Boulevard in Mount Pleasant	1993	current	Second form
SC 518	—	—	SC 54 east of Scranton SC 403 in Oats	SC 51 southeast of Evergreen Claussen	1940	1947	
SC 519	—	—	Remleys	SC 511 northeast of Cainhoy	1940	1947	
SC 520	—	—	SC 64 in Chaparral Ranches	Cypress Gardens	1936	1947	
SC 522	29.620	47.669	SC 97 in Liberty Hill	NC 522 at the North Carolina state line near Sapps Crossroads	1936	current	
SC 523	—	—	Kershaw–Lancaster county line near Liberty Hill	—	1936	1947	
SC 525	—	—	US 17 / US 701 in Charleston	Charleston International Airport in North Charleston	1937	1947	
SC 526	—	—	US 521 in Dalzell	US 521 near Camden	1939	1947	
SC 527	65.940	106.120	SC 41 near Warsaw	SC 341 / Cooper Mill Road in Wisacky	1939	current	
SC 528	—	—	SC 511 near Jamestown	US 521 northeast of Sampit	1939	1950	
SC 529	—	—	US 521 northwest of Heath Springs	US 521 in Lancaster	1939	1947	
SC 530	—	—	SC 713 southeast of Hilda	SC 5 / SC 68 in Denmark	1942	1947	
SC 531	—	—	US 52 / US 78 in North Charleston	SC 525 in North Charleston	1942	1947	
SC 532	—	—	SC 5 / SC 18 northwest of Blacksburg	North Carolina state line near Blacksburg	1942	1947	
SC 533	—	—	SC 901 in Edgemoor	SC 5 in Rowell	1942	1947	
SC 534	—	—	US 21 near Blackstock	Aiken Creek Road near Blackstock	1942	1947	
SC 536	—	—	SC 51 Alt. in Pamplico	Southeast of Pamplico	1942	1947	
SC 537	—	—	SC 5 in Gifford	Two Sisters Ferry Road near Varnville	1942	1947	
SC 538	—	—	SC 261 in Pinewood	SC 120 southwest of Privateer	1942	1947	
SC 541	10.660	17.156	SC 341 east of Olanta	US 52 in Coward	1940	current	
SC 542	—	—	US 301 in Wilson Crossroads	SC 154 near East Sumter	1942	1947	
SC 543	—	—	SC 54 west of Turbeville	SC 54 east of Turbeville	1942	1947	
SC 544	13.710	22.064	US 378 Truck / US 501 Bus. / US 701 Truck / French Collins Road in Red Hill	US 17 Bus. near Surfside Beach	1942	current	
SC 545	—	—	SC 279 northeast of Spring Hill	US 15 southwest of Bishopville	1942	1947	
SC 546	—	—	West of Thor	US 178 west of Woodford	1942	1947	
SC 547	—	—	SC 92 north of Union	SC 9 southwest of Kelton	1942	1947	
SC 548	—	—	SC 51 in Hemingway	Davis Road / East Lawrimore Road near Ard Crossroads	1942	1947	
SC 550	—	—	SC 5 in Rock Hill	East of India Hook	1942	1947	
SC 551	—	—	Hamer	North Carolina state line near Hamer	1942	1947	
SC 552	—	—	US 1 / SC 43 in Lexington Near Chapin	Near Lexington Lexington–Newberry county line north of Chapin	1942	1947	
SC 553	—	—	US 178 southwest of Woodford	SC 5 in Woodford	1942	1947	
SC 554	—	—	US 21 / SC 901 south of Rock Hill	US 21 northeast of Rock Hill	1942	1948	
SC 555	14.900	23.979	SC 12 in Columbia	US 21 east of Blythewood	1942	current	
SC 556	—	—	SC 55 near Kings Creek	Nimitz Road northeast of Smyrna	1942	1947	
SC 557	6.710	10.799	SC 55 / Ole Cambridge Circle east of Clover	SC 49 / SC 274 west of Lake Wylie	1942	current	
SC 560	14.200	22.853	SC 39 in Cross Hill	US 76 / Line Road in Kinards	1940	current	
SC 561	—	—	SC 56 near Mudlick	Belfast Road northeast of Mudlick	1940	1947	
SC 562	—	—	SC 56 south of Clinton Laurens–Union county line near Cross Keys	SC 72 near Clinton SC 92 in Cross Keys	1942	1947	
SC 563	—	—	Spartanburg–Union county line west of Buffalo	US 176 west of Buffalo	1942	1947	
SC 571	—	—	US 301 in Sellers	Marion–Dillon county line near Mullins	1942	1947	
SC 572	—	—	SC 175 near Gresham	SC 175 near Marion	1940	1947	
SC 573	—	—	SC 34 west of Dillon	SC 57 near Mullins	1942	1952	
SC 574	—	—	Bethea Extension Dillon–Marlboro county line near Minturn	SC 57 in Floydale SC 9 southeast of Clio	1942	1947	
SC 575	—	—	West of Marion	SC 57 in Gapway	1942	1947	
SC 576	3.090	4.973	US 76 / Wahee Road west of Marion	US 501 Bus. / SC 41 Alt. near Marion	1973	current	
SC 590	—	—	SC 24 northwest of Oakway	SC 59 northeast of Oakway	1942	1947	
SC 601	—	—	SC 43 northeast of Lexington	SC 6 north of Lexington	1939	1947	
SC 602	10.690	17.204	SC 6 in Red Bank	Charleston Highway / 13th Street / D Avenue in West Columbia	1940	current	
SC 603	—	—	Southwest of Irmo	SC 6 southwest of Irmo	1940	1947	
SC 604	—	—	SC 31 southeast of Cameron	SC 6 northwest of Elloree	1942	1947	
SC 605	—	—	—	—	1942	1947	
SC 610	—	—	Edenvale Road on Johns Island	US 17 in Red Top	1939	1946	
SC 611	—	—	SC 64 near Cotton Hill	US 78 / SC 2 in Summerville	1939	1946	
SC 612	—	—	SC 64 southwest of Moncks Corner West of Santee Circle	Lions Beach north of Moncks Corner US 52 / Millies Way Drive in Santee Circle	1940	1946	
SC 614	—	—	SC 61 in Charleston	US 17 in Charleston	1940	1951	
SC 615	—	—	Folly Beach	SC 700 in Charleston	1940	1956	
SC 616	—	—	SC 615 in Charleston	Ft. Johnson Road / Tallwood Road in Charleston	1942	1947	
SC 617	—	—	SC 82 northwest of McCormick	SC 28 northeast of Willington	1942	1947	
SC 630	—	—	SC 63 in Islandton	SC 64 / SC 217 in Lodge	1937	1947	
SC 631	—	—	SC 37 / SC 70 near Allendale	SC 128 in Grays	1932	1972	
SC 632	—	—	SC 63 southeast of Crocketville	SC 361 near Brunson	1939	1947	
SC 633	—	—	SC 63 southeast of Miley	SC 361 in Miley	1940	1947	
SC 635	—	—	SC 631 west of Luray	SC 331 near Gifford	1942	1947	
SC 636	—	—	SC 63 near Walterboro	SC 64 near Williams	1942	1947	
SC 637	—	—	SC 633 in Moselle	SC 36 near Moselle	1942	1947	
SC 638	—	—	Bentwood Road near Leesville	US 1 in Leesville	1942	1947	
SC 640	—	—	SC 64 near Walterboro	SC 173 near Grover	1939	1947	
SC 641	21.560	34.697	US 301 northeast of Allendale	SC 64 near Lodge	1929	current	
SC 642	19.292	31.047	US 17 Alt. / US 17 Alt. Truck southwest of Summerville	US 52 / US 78 in North Charleston	1939	current	
SC 643	—	—	SC 641 southwest of Ehrhardt	SC 334 northwest of Ehrhardt	1940	1946	
SC 644	—	—	SC 64 northwest of Walterboro	US 21 south of Smoaks	1940	1946	
SC 645	—	—	SC 63 near Islandton	SC 64 northwest of Bells Crossroads	1940	1946	
SC 646	—	—	SC 28 northwest of Allendale	SC 64 in Snelling	1942	1946	
SC 647	—	—	Near Jackson	SC 28 / SC 64 near Jackson	1942	1947	
SC 648	—	—	SC 649 near Ellenton	SC 39 in Dunbarton	1942	1947	
SC 649	—	—	West of Ellenton	SC 648 near Ellenton	1942	1947	
SC 650	—	—	SC 64 / SC 65 southwest of Summerville	SC 61 in Cooks Crossroads	1942	1950	
SC 651	8.270	13.309	US 17 Alt. in Cottageville	SC 61 near Cottageville	1940	current	
SC 652	10.480	16.866	US 601 in Pineland	US 278 near Ridgeland	1942	current	
SC 654	—	—	Allendale–Hampton county line near Lawtonville Crossroads	SC 631 in Lawtonville Crossroads	1942	1947	
SC 660	—	—	SC 279 near Ashwood	SC 341 / SC 527 in Wisacky	1942	1947	
SC 662	—	—	SC 82 in Willington	SC 617 northeast of Willington	1942	1947	
SC 663	—	—	US 501 near Rains	SC 571 near Rains	1942	1947	
SC 664	—	—	SC 177 north of Newberry	US 176 north of Newberry	1942	1947	
SC 665	—	—	US 21 / SC 5 near Columbia	SC 555 in Columbia	1942	1947	
SC 667	—	—	SC 171 in Greeleyville	Bennett Branch Road / Easler Highway north of Greeleyville	1942	1947	
SC 668	—	—	SC 6 west of Moncks Corner	Pinopolis	1942	1947	
SC 670	—	—	SC 43 in McCormick	US 25 / US 178 near Greenwood	1942	1969	
SC 691	—	—	SC 33 in Orangeburg	US 21 / SC 2 northwest of St. Matthews	1938	1947	
SC 692	9.100	14.645	US 321 / West Fifth Street in Swansea	SC 172 near North	1942	current	
SC 700	20.380	32.798	Dead end in Rockville	US 17 in Charleston	1940	current	
SC 702	18.950	30.497	SC 246 near Ninety Six	SC 39 southeast of Big Creek	1940	current	
SC 703	10.930	17.590	US 17 in Mount Pleasant	Palm Avenue / 41st Avenue in Isle of Palms	1933	current	
SC 704	—	—	SC 215 north of Salem Crossroads	US 21 in Chester	1939	1947	
SC 705	—	—	SC 66 near Renno	SC 7 near Renno	1940	1947	
SC 706	—	—	US 76 / SC 2 in Jalapa	SC 7 in Whitmire	1940	1947	
SC 707	—	—	SC 51 in Oatland	US 701 in Yauhannah	1939	1947	
SC 707	12.645	20.350	US 17 Bus. in Murrells Inlet	US 17 / Farrow Parkway in Myrtle Beach	1949	current	
SC 711	—	—	US 17 west of Pawleys Island	North Causeway Road in Pawleys Island	1939	1947	
SC 712	—	—	SC 41 in Lake View	SC 9 near Dillon	1940	1947	
SC 713	—	—	SC 64 northeast of Olar	SC 70 in Hilda	1942	1947	
SC 714	—	—	SC 70 in Barnwell	SC 304 south of Hilda	1942	1947	
SC 715	—	—	SC 70 in Hilda	SC 304 in Hilda	1942	1947	
SC 716	—	—	Cat Island ferry near North Santee	US 17 / US 701 in Georgetown	1942	1947	
SC 720	—	—	SC 72 east of Calhoun Falls	SC 28 in Abbeville	1942	1947	
SC 721	—	—	SC 72 in Calhoun Falls	SC 72 southwest of Abbeville	1942	1947	
SC 722	—	—	SC 72 near Leeds	SC 9 near Gayle Mill	1942	1947	
SC 723	—	—	SC 707 in Williams Hill	Near Woodbury	1942	1947	
SC 724	—	—	US 701 in Green Sea	North Carolina state line north of Green Sea	1942	1947	
SC 725	—	—	SC 160 in Indian Land	North Carolina state line near Indian Land	1942	1947	
SC 726	—	—	SC 175 in Indiantown	Bartells Road in Bartell Crossroads	1942	1947	
SC 727	—	—	SC 632 northwest of Crocketville	SC 361 northwest of Crocketville	1942	1947	
SC 730	—	—	SC 43 in McCormick	SC 817 southeast of Troy	1942	1947	
SC 742	3.510	5.649	SC 145 north of Chesterfield	NC 742 north of Chesterfield	1942	current	
SC 752	—	—	SC 381 in McColl	North Carolina state line east of McColl	1942	1947	
SC 760	1.182	1.902	US 76 / US 76 Conn. / US 378 in Columbia	Crossing over Wildcat Creek at Fort Jackson in Columbia	1939	current	
SC 761	—	—	US 276 northwest of Laurens	SC 308 north of Watts Mills	1940	1947	
SC 762	—	—	US 76 west of Clinton	SC 72 south of Clinton	1940	1947	
SC 763	13.950	22.450	SC 261 in Wedgefield	US 378 in East Sumter	1928	current	
SC 764	8.950	14.404	US 76 / US 378 near Horrell Hill	US 601 near Eastover	1942	current	
SC 765	—	—	US 76 east of Hickory Tavern	SC 101 southwest of Gray Court	1942	1947	
SC 766	—	—	US 221 in Laurens	A.B. Jacks Road southwest of Laurens	1942	1947	
SC 767	—	—	US 76 west of Mullins	Gilchrist Road near Mullins	1942	1947	
SC 768	—	—	Wahee Road near Marion	US 76 southwest of Marion	1942	1947	First form
SC 768	4.880	7.854	SC 48 in Arthurtown	US 76 / US 378 / Hallbrook Drive in Eastmont	1980	current	Second form
SC 769	9.590	15.434	SC 4 in Gadsden	US 76 / US 378 in Horrell Hill	1942	current	
SC 771	—	—	SC 432 near Whitetown	SC 43 east of McCormick	1942	1947	
SC 772	—	—	SC 9 southeast of Wallace	SC 77 in Fulton	1942	1947	
SC 773	5.490	8.835	US 76 east of Prosperity	US 176 in Pomaria	1942	current	
SC 774	—	—	SC 186 near Dacusville	Pickens–Greenville county line west of Slater–Marietta	1942	1947	
SC 781	3.561	5.731	US 278 southwest of White Pond	US 78 in White Pond	1940	current	
SC 782	—	—	SC 70 west of Denmark	SC 517 near Denmark	1942	1947	
SC 783	—	—	SC 64 in Cottageville	US 78 in Dorchester	1942	1947	
SC 784	—	—	SC 204 in Reevesville	US 78 in St. George	1942	1947	
SC 785	—	—	SC 381 west of Blenheim	SC 381 southeast of Argyle	1942	1947	
SC 786	—	—	US 17 / US 701 near Belle Isle Gardens	SC 716 in Belle Isle Gardens	1942	1947	
SC 790	—	—	US 178 near Liberty	SC 13 in Liberty	1942	1947	
SC 791	—	—	SC 384 northeast of Tatum	SC 79 northwest of McColl	1942	1947	
SC 801	—	—	SC 8 south of Easley	SC 86 west of Piedmont	1942	1947	
SC 802	6.690	10.767	US 21 / US 21 Bus. in Beaufort	Coosaw River Drive on Coosaw Island	1942	current	Parts of the highway were replaced by US 21 / SC 128; signed to end slightly farther east of its official eastern terminus.
SC 803	—	—	Burckmyer Drive on Gibbs Island	SC 285 in Beaufort	1942	1947	
SC 804	—	—	SC 917 north of Ketchuptown	US 701 near Allsbrook	1942	1947	
SC 805	—	—	SC 28 northwest of McCormick	SC 28 northwest of McCormick	1942	1947	
SC 810	—	—	SC 13 east of Easley	Powdersville Road north of Powdersville	1942	1947	
SC 811	—	—	SC 184 north of Lake Secession	SC 81 south of Homeland Park	1942	1947	
SC 812	—	—	Crossing over an unnamed creek on Saint Helena Island	SC 285 in Frogmore	1942	1947	
SC 813	—	—	Powell Road / Hole Avenue in North Santee	SC 528 in Sampit	1942	1947	
SC 814	—	—	US 25 near Princeton	Dunklin Bridge Road near Princeton	1942	1947	
SC 815	—	—	SC 72 near Greenwood	US 25 / US 178 northwest of Greenwood	1942	1947	
SC 816	—	—	SC 368 northeast of Ridgeland	SC 170 near Ridgeland	1942	1947	
SC 817	—	—	SC 104 northeast of McCormick	SC 10 in Troy	1942	1947	
SC 818	—	—	SC 202 in Little Mountain	SC 177 near Peak	1942	1947	
SC 819	—	—	SC 288 near Pumpkintown	SC 288 west of Pumpkintown	1942	1947	
SC 820	—	—	Anderson–Pickens county line southeast of Easley	SC 13 in Easley	1942	1947	
SC 821	—	—	SC 43 southwest of McCormick	SC 82 near Bordeaux	c. 1929	1947	
SC 822	—	—	Southwest of Lowndesville	SC 82 in Lowndesville	1938	1947	
SC 823	11.140	17.928	SC 81 in Mount Carmel	SC 72 southwest of Abbeville	1940	current	Two instances: 1940–1947 and 1950–present
SC 824	—	—	Barnes Station	SC 82 south of Iva	1940	1947	
SC 831	—	—	SC 381 northeast of Clio	SC 95 near Minturn	1940	1947	
SC 850	—	—	SC 85 north of Chesterfield	NC 742 at the North Carolina state line north of Chesterfield	1940	1942	
SC 851	—	—	SC 9 near Chesterfield	North Carolina state line northeast of Chesterfield	1940	1947	
SC 900	—	—	SC 9 west of Mount Croghan	North Carolina state line northwest of Mount Croghan	1942	1947	
SC 901	38.730	62.330	SC 200 near Mitford	SC 161 / SC 274 in Rock Hill	c. 1926	current	
SC 902	—	—	SC 265 in Midway	SC 9 in High Point	c. 1935	1951	
SC 903	27.090	43.597	SC 151 / Catarah Road in Catarrh	US 521 Bus. / SC 200 / Elm Street in Lancaster	1926	current	
SC 904	—	—	US 701 near Bayboro	North Carolina state line north of Loris	1936	c. 1952	
SC 905	25.610	41.215	US 378 / US 701 in Conway	NC 905 at the North Carolina state line northeast of Longs	1937	current	
SC 906	—	—	US 521 / SC 9 in Lancaster	SC 9 southwest of Pageland	1937	1949	
SC 907	—	—	SC 9 in Chester	SC 5 in Kings Creek	1937	1960	
SC 908	7.610	12.247	US 378 / Woodberry Court near Brittons Neck	SC 41 near Brittons Neck	1939	current	
SC 909	14.060	22.627	SC 9 near Rodman	US 321 in Lowrys	1940	current	
SC 910	—	—	SC 151 southwest of Angelus	Wexford Road near Wexford	1940	1947	
SC 911	—	—	Southeast of Wallace	SC 9 near Wallace	1940	1947	
SC 912	8.350	13.438	US 15 / US 401 / Marlboro Road in Dyers Hill	SC 9 northwest of Bennettsville	1940	current	
SC 913	—	—	SC 41 southwest of Kemper	Ward Store Road at the North Carolina state line southeast of Hamer	1940	1947	
SC 914	1.720	2.768	SC 9 Bus. on the Lancaster Mill–Lancaster line	SC 200 in Springdale	1940	current	
SC 915	—	—	SC 9 near Minturn	SC 9 southwest of Bennettsville	1940	1947	
SC 916	—	—	SC 9 northwest of Little Rock SC 83 southeast of McColl	SC 831 near Clio SC 381 in McColl	1940	1947	
SC 917	39.690	63.875	SC 9 Bus. / SC 410 in Finklea	SC 38 west of Latta	1940	current	
SC 918	—	—	SC 9 west of Lancaster	SC 504 in Van Wyck	1940	1947	
SC 919	—	—	SC 9 in Clio	SC 384 in Tatum	1940	1947	
SC 920	—	—	SC 9 in Pageland	North Carolina state line northeast of Pageland	1942	1947	
SC 921	—	—	SC 922 southeast of Sedalia	US 176 in Union	1939	1947	
SC 922	—	—	SC 92 in Cross Keys	SC 921 southeast of Sedalia	1940	1947	
SC 923	—	—	SC 9 in Antioch	North Carolina state line near Lancaster	1942	1947	
SC 930	—	—	Southeast of Great Falls	SC 93 northeast of Great Falls	1940	1947	
SC 941	—	—	US 301 near Manning Newman Branch Road southeast of New Zion Puddin Swamp Road east of New Zion	SC 527 near Sardinia SC 94 near New Zion SC 54 east of Turbeville	1940	1947	
SC 942	—	—	Newman Branch Road south of New Zion	SC 543 north of New Zion	1942	1947	
SC 943	—	—	SC 902 near White Bluff Crossroads	SC 96 in Taxahaw	1942	1947	
SC 944	—	—	SC 522 northeast of Pleasant Hill	SC 341 near Antioch Acres	1942	1947	
SC 945	—	—	SC 91 near Adamsburg	SC 9 in Adamsburg	1942	1947	
SC 946	—	—	SC 901 southwest of Lesslie	Reservation Road east of Springstein	1942	1947	
Former

== List of alternate routes ==
South Carolina alternate routes have been utilized in a multitude of ways, including business, bypass, cut-thru and spurs. Today, only one alternate route is currently active in the state.

Number	Length (mi)	Length (km)	Southern or western terminus	Northern or eastern terminus	Formed	Removed	Notes
SC 2 Alt.	—	—	US 76 / SC 2 in Slighs	US 76 / SC 2 in Little Mountain	c. 1940	1947	
SC 4 Alt.	—	—	SC 4 in Neeses	SC 5 in Neeses	c. 1940	1947	
SC 4 Alt.	—	—	US 21 in Orangeburg	SC 4 in Orangeburg	c. 1937	1947	
SC 5 Alt.	—	—	SC 5 in Hardeeville	US 17 / SC 46 in Hardeeville	1939	1947	
SC 7 Alt.	—	—	US 176 northeast of Whitmire	SC 7 northeast of Whitmire	1940	1942	
SC 9 Alt.	—	—	US 1 / US 52 in Cheraw	SC 9 in Cheraw	c. 1942	1947	
SC 9 Alt.	—	—	US 521 south of Lancaster	US 521 / SC 9 in Lancaster	c. 1942	1947	
SC 9 Alt.	—	—	SC 9 in Richburg	SC 901 in Richburg	1939	1947	
SC 9 Alt.	—	—	SC 9 in Jonesville	SC 11 in Jonesville	1938	1947	
SC 9 Alt.	—	—	SC 9 near Pacolet	US 176 in Spartanburg	1946	1947	
SC 11 Alt.	—	—	SC 11 east of Chesnee	US 221 east of Chesnee	c. 1940	—	
SC 13 Alt.	—	—	SC 250 in Greenville	SC 13 in Greenville	c. 1940	c. 1950	
SC 18 Alt.	—	—	SC 184 in Antreville	SC 18 in Antreville	1936	1938	
SC 18 Alt.	—	—	US 29 in Gaffney	SC 18 in Gaffney	1938	1940	
SC 18 Alt.	—	—	Limestone Street in Gaffney	US 29 in Gaffney	1940	1947	
SC 19 Alt.	—	—	US 25 near Trenton	SC 19 in Trenton	1939	c. 1966	
SC 22 Alt.	—	—	SC 22 in Greenwood	US 221 / SC 72 in Greenwood	c. 1940	1947	
SC 22 Alt.	—	—	SC 22 in Great Falls	SC 22 in Great Falls	c. 1937	1947	
SC 26 Alt.	—	—	SC 26 near Eastover	SC 26 near Eastover	1937	c. 1942	
SC 28 Alt.	—	—	SC 184 in Antreville	SC 28 / SC 284 in Antreville	1938	1947	
SC 28 Alt.	0.4	0.64	SC 28 in Ellenton	Downtown Ellenton	c. 1937	1942	
SC 28 Alt.	—	—	SC 28 in Hampton	SC 28 in Hampton	1938	1947	
SC 41 Alt.	22.904	36.860	SC 41 in Centenary	SC 41 / SC 57 in Fork	1952	current	
SC 51 Alt.	—	—	SC 51 in Pamplico	SC 51 in Pamplico	1936	1947	
SC 53 Alt.	—	—	SC 341 near Hobbs Crossroads	SC 341 near Hobbs Crossroads	1938	1947	
SC 61 Alt.	—	—	US 17 west of Charleston	SC 61 west of Charleston	1940	1947	
SC 61 Alt.	—	—	SC 61 south of Summerville	SC 61 south of Summerville	1936	1947	
SC 64 Alt.	—	—	SC 64 in Olar	SC 5 in Olar	1937	1947	
SC 64 Alt.	—	—	US 17 in Walterboro	SC 64 in Walterboro	c. 1939	1947	
SC 70 Alt.	—	—	SC 3 in Barnwell	SC 70 in Barnwell	c. 1939	1947	
SC 72 Alt.	—	—	US 176 northeast of Whitmire	SC 72 northeast of Whitmire	1942	1947	
SC 90 Alt.	—	—	US 501 / SC 90 in Conway	US 501 in Red Hill	1937	1947	
SC 93 Alt.	—	—	SC 9 / SC 914 in Crocketts Crossroads	US 521 / SC 9 in Lancaster	1937	1947	
SC 104 Alt.	—	—	SC 104 / SC 432 near Troy	SC 104 / SC 432 near Troy	1942	1947	
SC 128 Alt.	—	—	SC 336 in Ridgeland	SC 128 in Ridgeland	c. 1946	1947	
SC 151 Alt.	—	—	SC 151 west of Hartsville	SC 151 in Hartsville	1938	1947	
SC 151 Alt.	7.4	11.9	SC 151 southeast of Hartsville	SC 151 / Segars Mill Road west of Hartsville	1954	c. 1972	
SC 170 Alt.	23.0	37.0	US 17 Alt. near Levy	SC 46 / SC 170 near Levy	1972	2010	
SC 171 Alt.	—	—	SC 171 in Salters	SC 171 in Salters	c. 1939	1947	
SC 174 Alt.	—	—	SC 174 in Edisto Beach	Dock Site Road in Edisto Beach	c. 1939	1947	
SC 175 Alt.	—	—	US 521 / SC 175 in Kingstree	US 52 north of Kingstree	c. 1939	1947	
SC 179 Alt.	—	—	Morrison Street in McClellanville	SC 179 in McClellanville	c. 1939	1947	
SC 188 Alt.	—	—	SC 185 near Antreville	SC 188 near Antreville	1940	1942	
SC 215 Alt.	—	—	SC 112 / SC 215 in Carlisle	SC 72 / SC 215 in Carlisle	c. 1942	1946	
SC 265 Alt.	—	—	SC 157 / SC 341 in Kershaw	SC 265 in Kershaw	c. 1941	1946	
SC 281 Alt.	—	—	SC 281 in Beaufort	US 21 in Beaufort	c. 1939	1946	
SC 322 Alt.	—	—	US 21 / SC 5 in Rock Hill	SC 322 in Rock Hill	1940	c. 1959	
SC 341 Alt.	—	—	SC 341 in Olanta	SC 341 north of Olanta	1936	1947	
SC 391 Alt.	—	—	US 1 in Batesburg	SC 391 in Batesburg	1936	1947	
SC 403 Alt.	—	—	SC 403 in Timmonsville	US 76 east of Timmonsville	1940	1947	
SC 703 Alt.	—	—	SC 703 in Mount Pleasant	US 17 / US 701 in Mount Pleasant	1940	1945	
SC 901 Alt.	—	—	SC 901 southwest of Lando	SC 901 in Lando	1936	1947	
SC 906 Alt.	—	—	SC 906 east of Lancaster	Kelly Drive near Lancaster	c. 1942	1947	
Former

== List of business loops ==
South Carolina business routes were first established in 1949. All business routes in the state are set up as a loop, meaning it will separate then converge back to the main highway. Typically, they serve to connect downtown areas in cities and towns in the state.

Number	Length (mi)	Length (km)	Southern or western terminus	Northern or eastern terminus	Formed	Removed	Notes
SC 3 Bus.	2.870	4.619	SC 3 near Springfield	SC 3 northeast of Springfield	—	—	
SC 5 Bus.	4.290	6.904	SC 5 / SC 161 in York	SC 5 / Sutton Spring Road northwest of York	1986	current	
SC 9 Bus.	14.990	24.124	SC 9 southeast of Loris	SC 9 south of Green Sea	1982	current	
SC 9 Bus.	2.400	3.862	US 15 / US 401 / SC 9 / SC 38 / SC 38 Bus. in Bennettsville	SC 9 / SC 38 in Bennettsville	1985	current	
SC 9 Bus.	2.2	3.5	SC 9 near Chesterfield	SC 9 near Chesterfield	1949	1956	
SC 9 Bus.	5.370	8.642	US 521 / SC 9 east of Lancaster	SC 9 west of Lancaster	1967	current	
SC 9 Bus.	2.850	4.587	SC 9 / SC 72 / SC 97 / SC 121 east of Chester	US 321 / SC 9 in Gayle Mill	1956	current	
SC 11 Bus.	—	—	SC 11 near Salem	SC 11 near Salem	1971	1976	
SC 28 Bus.	—	—	US 76 / US 123 / SC 28 west of Clemson	US 76 / US 123 Conn. / SC 28 near Clemson	1962	1964	
SC 28 Bus.	—	—	SC 28 near Seneca	SC 28 near Seneca	1957	2000	
SC 28 Bus.	3.900	6.276	US 76 / SC 28 west of Clemson	US 76 / SC 28 / Woody Road south of Pendleton	1962	current	
SC 28 Bus.	5.000	8.047	US 76 / SC 28 in Northlake	US 29 / SC 28 in Homeland Park	1960	current	
SC 28 Bus.	—	—	SC 28 near Abbeville	SC 28 near Abbeville	1957	1989	
SC 34 Bus.	2.6	4.2	SC 34 / SC 34 Conn. in Newberry	US 76 / SC 34 / SC 219 in Newberry	1976	2010	
SC 38 Bus.	2.865	4.611	SC 38 in Bennettsville	US 15 / US 401 / SC 9 / SC 38 in Bennettsville	c. 1985	current	
SC 41 Bus.	4.660	7.500	SC 41 near Andrews	SC 41 north of Andrews	1996	current	
SC 56 Bus.	3.090	4.973	SC 56 / SC 72 in Clinton	SC 56 north of Clinton	—	—	
SC 64 Bus.	2.660	4.281	SC 64 in Walterboro	SC 64 in Walterboro	1985	current	
SC 72 Bus.	4.310	6.936	SC 72 west of Greenwood	US 25 / US 178 / US 221 / SC 72 in Greenwood	1961	current	
SC 72 Bus.	3.310	5.327	SC 72 / Chestnut Street in Clinton	SC 56 / SC 72 in Clinton	—	—	
SC 72 Bus.	2.6	4.2	SC 72 near Chester	SC 72 near Chester	1954	—	
SC 72 Bus.	1.8	2.9	SC 72 / SC 121 / SC 901 in Rock Hill	US 21 Bus. / SC 5 in Rock Hill	1961	—	
SC 97 Bus.	—	—	US 321 / SC 97 in Chester	US 321 / SC 97 in Chester	c. 1987	c. 2009	
SC 121 Bus.	2.6	4.2	SC 121 near Chester	SC 121 near Chester	1964	—	
SC 151 Bus.	7.540	12.134	SC 151 southeast of Hartsville	SC 151 / Segars Mill Road west of Hartsville	1958	current	
SC 151 Bus.	3.190	5.134	SC 151 south of Jefferson	SC 151 / Miller Road north of Jefferson	1997	current	
SC 151 Bus.	3.030	4.876	SC 151 south of Pageland	US 601 / SC 151 in Pageland	1983	current	
SC 161 Bus.	4.460	7.178	SC 5 / SC 5 Bus. / SC 161 in York	US 321 / SC 5 / SC 161 in York	—	—	
SC 252 Bus.	—	—	SC 252 in Ware Shoals	US 25 / SC 252 in Ware Shoals	—	—	Actually the SC 252 mainline signed as a business loop
Former

== List of other special routes ==
South Carolina occasionally utilizes other uniquely bannered routes in the state. Listed here are connector routes, truck routes, and spur routes.

Number	Length (mi)	Length (km)	Southern or western terminus	Northern or eastern terminus	Formed	Removed	Notes
SC 4 Truck	17.500	28.164	US 1 Truck / US 78 Truck / SC 4 / SC 118 / SC 302 east of Aiken	SC 4 / SC 302 in Kitchings Mill	—	—	
SC 5 Truck	5.1	8.2	SC 5 / SC 72 in Rock Hill	SC 5 / SC 901 in Rock Hill	—	2013	
SC 5 Conn.	1.040	1.674	SC 322 in Rock Hill	SC 5 / SC 901 in Rock Hill	2013	current	
SC 6 Conn.	0.090	0.145	SC 6 southwest of Irmo	SC 6 southwest of Irmo	—	—	Unsigned
SC 6 Truck	0.770	1.239	SC 47 / SC 47 Truck southwest of Elloree	SC 6 / SC 47 Truck / SC 267 in Elloree	—	—	Completely concurrent with SC 47 Truck
SC 6 Conn.	1.685	2.712	I-95 / US 15 / US 301 southeast of Santee	SC 6 southeast of Santee	—	—	Unsigned
SC 6 Truck	2.270	3.653	US 17 Alt. / SC 6 in Moncks Corner	US 52 / SC 6 / Main Street Extension in Moncks Corner	—	—	
SC 8 Conn.	0.190	0.306	SC 8 in Easley	SC 93 in Easley	—	—	
SC 9 Conn.	0.170	0.274	SC 9 in Lake View	SC 41 in Lake View	—	—	Unsigned
SC 9 Truck	5.890	9.479	US 1 / US 1 Truck / US 52 Truck / SC 9 in Cheraw	SC 9 west of Cheraw	—	—	
SC 9 Conn.	0.090	0.145	SC 9 in Jonesville	SC 18 in Jonesville	—	—	Unsigned
SC 12 Conn.	0.450	0.724	US 1 in West Columbia	US 378 in West Columbia	—	—	Unsigned
SC 12 Spur	0.334	0.538	SC 12 in Columbia	I-77 in Columbia	—	—	Unsigned
SC 14 Truck	4.610	7.419	SC 14 in Greer	US 29 / SC 14 / SC 290 Truck in Greer	—	—	
SC 18 Truck	3.980	6.405	US 176 / SC 215 south of Union	SC 18 in Union	—	—	
SC 18 Conn.	0.520	0.837	US 176 / SC 18 Truck / SC 215 in Union	SC 18 in Union	—	—	Unsigned
SC 18 Conn.	2.310	3.718	SC 11 / SC 18 in Gaffney	SC 18 in Gaffney	—	—	Signed as the SC 18 mainline
SC 19 Truck	9.880	15.900	SC 19 / SC 118 / SC 302 in Aiken	US 1 Truck / US 78 Truck / SC 19 / SC 118 in Aiken	—	—	
SC 19 Conn.	0.130	0.209	SC 19 in Aiken	US 1 / US 78 / SC 19 in Aiken	—	—	Signed as the SC 19 mainline
SC 19 Conn.	2.040	3.283	SC 19 / Greenhouse Road south of Trenton	SC 19 in Trenton	—	—	Unsigned
SC 20 Truck	5.350	8.610	SC 71 Truck / SC 72 / SR 203 Truck in Abbeville	SC 20 Conn. / SC 28 / SC 28 Conn. northwest of Abbeville	—	—	
SC 20 Conn.	0.870	1.400	SC 20 Truck / SC 28 / SC 28 Conn. northwest of Abbeville	SC 20 near Abbeville	—	—	Unsigned
SC 20 Conn.	1.090	1.754	SC 20 in Craytonville	SC 20 in Craytonville	—	—	
SC 23 Truck	4.950	7.966	US 25 / US 25 Truck / SC 23 in Edgefield	SC 23 / SC 430 east of Edgefield	—	—	
SC 28 Conn.	0.420	0.676	SC 71 in Abbeville	SC 20 Conn. / SC 20 Truck / SC 28 northwest of Abbeville	—	—	Unsigned
SC 31 Conn.	2.300	3.701	US 17 / Main Street in North Myrtle Beach	SC 90 north of North Myrtle Beach	—	—	Unsigned
SC 34 Conn.	0.590	0.950	SC 121 southwest of Newberry	SC 34 near Newberry	—	—	Unsigned
SC 34 Truck	0.830	1.336	US 1 Truck / US 521 / US 521 Truck in Camden	US 1 / US 1 Truck / US 521 Truck / SC 34 in Camden	—	—	Completely concurrent with US 1 Truck and US 521 Truck
SC 34 Truck	13.510	21.742	SC 34 / SC 151 in Darlington	SC 34 northeast of Darlington	—	—	
SC 34 Conn.	0.300	0.483	US 52 / US 401 / SC 34 Truck in Darlington	SC 34 / SC 151 in Darlington	—	—	Signed as "34–401 Connector"
SC 39 Conn.	0.160	0.257	SC 39 in Jones Crossroads	SC 391 in Jones Crossroads	—	—	Signed as part of SC 391
SC 47 Truck	1.080	1.738	SC 6 Truck / SC 47 southwest of Elloree	SC 6 / SC 47 / SC 267 in Elloree	—	—	
SC 48 Truck	0.580	0.933	US 21 / US 21 Conn. / US 76 Conn. / US 176 / US 321 in Columbia	US 21 Conn. / US 76 / SC 48 in Columbia	—	—	Completely concurrent with US 21 Conn./US 76 Conn.
SC 49 Truck	1.790	2.881	SC 49 in Union	US 176 / SC 18 Truck / SC 49 / SC 215 in Union	—	—	
SC 49 Conn.	3.090	4.973	SC 49 southeast of Monarch Mill	SC 49 / Monarch School Drive in Monarch Mill	—	—	
SC 51 Conn.	0.240	0.386	SC 51 in Florence	US 52 / James Jones Avenue in Florence	—	—	Unsigned
SC 56 Conn.	0.330	0.531	SC 56 in Spartanburg	US 176 / SC 9 / Glendalyn Avenue in Spartanburg	—	—	Unsigned
SC 61 Conn.	0.163	0.262	SC 61 / Savage Road in Charleston	SC 61 in Charleston	—	—	Unsigned; signed as SC 61 instead
SC 61 Conn.	0.272	0.438	SC 61 near Summerville	SC 165 near Summerville	—	—	Unsigned
SC 66 Conn.	0.180	0.290	SC 56 southwest of Joanna	SC 66 southwest of Joanna	—	—	Unsigned
SC 71 Truck	4.870	7.838	SC 20 Truck / SC 72 / SC 203 Truck in Abbeville	SC 20 Truck / SC 28 / SC 71 in Abbeville	—	—	Entirely concurrent with SC 20 Truck
SC 72 Conn.	0.150	0.241	US 176 northeast of Whitmire	SC 72 / SC 121 northeast of Whitmire	—	—	Unsigned
SC 75 Truck	4.63	7.45	SC 5 / SC 75 near Van Wyck	US 521 / SC 75 near Van Wyck	—	—	
SC 90 Truck	3.910	6.293	US 378 / US 378 Truck / US 501 / US 701 / US 701 Truck in Conway	US 378 Truck / US 501 Bus. / US 701 Truck / SC 90 in Red Hill	—	—	Completely concurrent with US 378 Truck and US 701 Truck
SC 90 Conn.	0.170	0.274	Sea Mountain Highway in Little River	SC 90 in Little River	—	—	Unsigned
SC 92 Conn.	0.060	0.097	SC 92 in Enoree	US 221 in Enoree	—	—	Unsigned
SC 101 Truck	5.610	9.028	SC 80 / SC 101 in Greer	SC 14 / SC 101 / SC 290 / SC 290 Truck in Greer	—	—	
SC 105 Conn.	0.150	0.241	SC 211 in Saratt	SC 105 in Saratt	—	—	Unsigned
SC 105 Conn.	0.350	0.563	SC 105 near Draytonville	SC 105 near Draytonville	—	—	
SC 125 Conn.	0.772	1.242	US 1 / US 78 / US 278 in North Augusta	SC 125 in North Augusta	—	—	
SC 125 Truck	1.730	2.784	US 25 / SC 121 / SC 125 / SC 230 in North Augusta	US 25 Bus. / SC 125 in North Augusta	—	—	
SC 150 Truck	0.570	0.917	SC 150 in Pacolet	SC 150 in Pacolet	—	—	
SC 157 Truck	1.330	2.140	SC 157 / SC 341 / SC 341 Truck in Kershaw	US 521 / US 601 / SC 341 Truck in Kershaw	—	—	
SC 160 Conn.	0.060	0.097	US 21 Bus. / SC 160 in Fort Mill	US 21 Bus. in Fort Mill	—	—	Unsigned; is, in fact, the southbound lane of US 21 Bus., but neither highway is marked on this short portion.
SC 160 Truck	6.990	11.249	US 21 / SC 160 in Fort Mill	SC 160 / SC 460 in Fort Mill	—	—	
SC 169 Spur	—	—	Near Chelsea	SC 169 near Chelsea	1942	1947	
SC 200 Conn.	0.490	0.789	US 321 Bus. in Winnsboro	SC 200 in Winnsboro	—	—	Unsigned
SC 203 Truck	0.592	0.953	SC 20 Truck / SC 71 Truck / SC 72 in Abbeville	SC 203 in Abbeville	—	—	
SC 212 Conn.	0.130	0.209	SC 64 northeast of Bells Crossroads	SC 212 northeast of Bells Crossroads	—	—	Unsigned
SC 215 Conn.	0.120	0.193	SC 215 south of Union	SC 18 in Union	—	—	Unsigned
SC 252 Truck	6.868	11.053	SC 252 in Ware Shoals	US 25 / US 25 Bus. / SC 252 near Ware Shoals	—	—	
SC 281 Spur	—	—	7th Street in Port Royal	SC 281 in Port Royal	1963	1982	
SC 290 Truck	5.810	9.350	US 29 / SC 14 Truck / SC 101 / SC 290 in Greer	SC 80 / SC 290 in Greer	—	—	
SC 292 Conn.	0.770	1.239	SC 292 in Lyman	US 29 in Wellford	—	—	Unsigned
SC 336 Conn.	0.150	0.241	SC 336 in Ridgeland	US 278 / US 278 Conn. / Town Square in Ridgeland	—	—	Unsigned
SC 341 Truck	1.330	2.140	SC 157 / SC 157 Truck / SC 341 in Kershaw	US 521 / US 601 / SC 157 Truck in Kershaw	—	—	
SC 385 Conn.	1.060	1.706	SC 385 in Bennettsville	US 15 / US 401 / SC 9 southeast of Bennettsville	—	—	Unsigned
SC 406 Spur	—	—	Near Shelton	SC 406 near Shelton	c. 1946	1947	None
SC 430 Conn.	0.180	0.290	SC 23 Truck / SC 430 in Edgefield	US 25 / SC 23 Truck north of Edgefield	—	—	Unsigned
SC 453 Truck	10.670	17.172	US 176 Truck / SC 453 in Boyer	SC 45 / SC 453 in Eutawville	—	—	
SC 478 Temp.	8.5	13.7	I-26 in Cayce	US 76 / US 378 in Columbia	1989	1995	
SC 527 Conn.	0.290	0.467	SC 527 in Kingstree	SC 377 / Ashton Avenue in Kingstree	—	—	Unsigned
SC 544 Conn.	0.860	1.384	SC 544 in Red Hill	US 378 Truck / US 501 Bus. / US 701 Truck in Red Hill	—	—	Unsigned
SC 544 Conn.	0.500	0.805	SC 544 Conn. in Red Hill	US 501 in Red Hill	—	—	Unsigned
SC 768 Conn.	1.059	1.704	SC 768 / Pineview Drive near Columbia	Longwood Road near Columbia	—	—	Unsigned
Former
