= Fingerville =

Fingerville may refer to:

- Fingerville, South Carolina: a census-designated place in the United States
- Fingerville, Keewatin: a former village which is now part of The Pas, Manitoba, Canada
