= South Carolina Highway 111 =

South Carolina Highway 111 may refer to:

- South Carolina Highway 111 (1920s–1930s): a former state highway partially in Gaffney
- South Carolina Highway 111 (1940s): a former state highway from Gilbert to Ridge Crossroads
