= Gayle Mill =

Gayle Mill may refer to:

- Gayle Mill, North Yorkshire, England, a late 18th-century mill
- Gayle Mill, South Carolina, United States
