= South Carolina Highway 108 =

Highway in South Carolina, USA

South Carolina Highway 108

Route information
- Maintained by SCDOT
- Existed: 1940–1947

Major junctions
- West end: SC 100 southwest of Cheraw
- East end: SC 9 in Cheraw

Location
- Country: United States
- State: South Carolina
- Counties: Chesterfield

Highway system
- South Carolina State Highway System; Interstate; US; State; Scenic
← SC 107	→ SC 109

South Carolina Highway 108 (SC 108) was a state highway that existed in the east-central part of Chesterfield. It was partially in the city limits of the town of Cheraw.

== Route description ==
SC 108 began at an intersection with SC 100 (now Teal's Mill Road) southeast of Cheraw. It traveled to the northeast into Cheraw, where it met its eastern terminus, an intersection with SC 9.

== History ==
SC 108 was established in 1940. It was decommissioned in 1947. It was downgraded to a secondary road. Today, it is known as Main Street Extension and West Main Street.

== Major intersections ==
The entire route was in Chesterfield County.

Location	mi	km	Destinations	Notes
			SC 100	Western terminus; now Teal's Mill Road
			SC 9	Eastern terminus
1.000 mi = 1.609 km; 1.000 km = 0.621 mi
