= South Carolina Highway 117 =

Former state highway in South Carolina, United States

South Carolina Highway 117

Route information
- Maintained by SCDOT
- Existed: 1940–1947

Major junctions
- West end: SC 605 near Orangeburg
- SC 210 near Orangeburg; SC 2 southwest of St. Matthews; SC 6 / SC 691 in St. Matthews; SC 236 near St. Matthews
- East end: SC 235 near St. Matthews

Location
- Country: United States
- State: South Carolina
- Counties: Calhoun

Highway system
- South Carolina State Highway System; Interstate; US; State; Scenic
← SC 116	→ SC 118

South Carolina Highway 117 (SC 117) was a state highway that existed entirely in Calhoun County. It existed partially within the city limits of St. Matthews.

== Route description ==
SC 117 began at an intersection with SC 605 (now Kennedy Road) north-northwest of Orangeburg. It traveled to the east-northeast and intersected SC 210 (now US 21). It continued to the east-northeast and intersected SC 2 (now US 176) just before entering St. Matthews. In that town, it intersected SC 6/SC 691. The highway then proceeded to the north-northeast and intersected SC 236 (now Ft. Motte Road). It then curved to the north-northwest for a short distance until it reached its eastern terminus, an intersection with SC 235 (now Old Belleville Road and Purple Martin Road).

== History ==
SC 117 was established in 1940 from SC 210 to SC 6/SC 691. In 1942, it was extended to its greatest extent (as described above). It was decommissioned in 1947. Its path was downgraded to a secondary road. Today, it is known as Burke Road, Chestnut Street, Herlong Avenue, and Old Belleville Road.

== Major intersections ==
The entire route was in Calhoun County.

Location	mi	km	Destinations	Notes
			SC 605	Western terminus; now Kennedy Road
			SC 210	Now US 21
			SC 2	Now US 176
St. Matthews			SC 6 / SC 691	
			SC 236	Now Ft. Motte Road
			SC 235	Eastern terminus; now Old Belleville Road and Purple Martin Road
1.000 mi = 1.609 km; 1.000 km = 0.621 mi
