= South Carolina Highway 32 (1920s) =

Former state highway in South Carolina, United States

South Carolina Highway 32

Route information
- Maintained by SCDOT
- Existed: 1922–c.1925

Major junctions
- West end: SC 30 near Henderson
- East end: SC 6 near Jacksonboro

Location
- Country: United States
- State: South Carolina
- Counties: Colleton

Highway system
- South Carolina State Highway System; Interstate; US; State; Scenic
← SC 31	→ SC 33

South Carolina Highway 32 (SC 32) was a state highway that existed in the southern part of Colleton County. It connected the Henderson and Jacksonboro areas.

== Route description ==
SC 32 began at an intersection with SC 30 (now U.S. Route 17 Alternate (US 17 Alt.)) south-southwest of Henderson. It traveled to the east-southeast to Ritter. It then proceeded to the east-northeast to SC 6 (now SC 64) west-northwest of Jacksonboro.

== History ==
SC 32 was an original state highway, being established at least as early as 1922. It was decommissioned in 1925 or 1926. It was downgraded to a secondary road. Today, it is known as Ritter Road.

== Major intersections ==
The entire route was in Colleton County.

Location	mi	km	Destinations	Notes
			SC 30	Western terminus; now US 17 Alt.
			SC 6	Eastern terminus; now SC 64
1.000 mi = 1.609 km; 1.000 km = 0.621 mi
