= South Carolina Highway 62 (1920s–1930s) =

Former state highway in South Carolina, United States

South Carolina Highway 62

Route information
- Maintained by SCDOT
- Existed: 1923–1936

Major junctions
- West end: US 17 in Red Top
- East end: SC 61 north of Johns Island

Location
- Country: United States
- State: South Carolina
- Counties: Charleston

Highway system
- South Carolina State Highway System; Interstate; US; State; Scenic
← SC 61	→ SC 63

South Carolina Highway 62 (SC 62) was a state highway that existed in the central part of Charleston County.

== Route description ==
SC 62 began at an intersection with U.S. Route 17 (US 17) in Red Top. It traveled to the northeast on Bees Ferry Road and ended at SC 61 north of Johns Island, near Drayton Hall.

== History ==
SC 62 was established in 1923. It was decommissioned in 1936. Its path now is part of US 17 and the entirety of Bees Ferry Road.

== Major intersections ==
The entire route was in Charleston County.

Location	mi	km	Destinations	Notes
Red Top			US 17	Western terminus
			SC 61	Eastern terminus
1.000 mi = 1.609 km; 1.000 km = 0.621 mi
