= South Carolina Highway 50 (1940s) =

Former state highway in South Carolina, United States

South Carolina Highway 50

Route information
- Maintained by SCDOT
- Existed: c.1942–1947

Major junctions
- West end: US 21 / SC 5 in Rock Hill
- East end: Mill Street in Rock Hill

Location
- Country: United States
- State: South Carolina
- Counties: York

Highway system
- South Carolina State Highway System; Interstate; US; State; Scenic
← SC 49	→ SC 51

South Carolina Highway 50 (SC 50) was a state highway that existed in the central part of Orangeburg County. It connected Cordova and Orangeburg.

== Route description ==
SC 50 began at an intersection with U.S. Route 21 (US 21) and SC 5 (now Oakland Avenue) in Rock Hill. It traveled to the east on Cedar Street, crossed over a railroad line, and traveled on Curtis Street to end at Mill Street.

== History ==
SC 50 was established by 1943. It was decommissioned in 1947. It was downgraded to secondary roads.

== Major intersections ==
The entire route was in Rock Hill, York County.

mi	km	Destinations	Notes
		US 21 / SC 5	Western terminus
		Mill Street	Eastern terminus
1.000 mi = 1.609 km; 1.000 km = 0.621 mi
