= South Carolina Highway 84 =

Was a state highway existed far northern part of Greenville County

South Carolina Highway 84

Route information
- Maintained by SCDOT
- Existed: c.1935–1947

Western section
- West end: US 276 northwest of Cleveland
- East end: Solomon Jones Road at the North Carolina state line northwest of Cleveland

Eastern section
- West end: Solomon Jones Road at the North Carolina state line northwest of Cleveland
- East end: YMCA Camp Greenville northwest of Cleveland

Location
- Country: United States
- State: South Carolina
- Counties: Greenville

Highway system
- South Carolina State Highway System; Interstate; US; State; Scenic
← SC 83	→ I-85

South Carolina Highway 84 (SC 84) was a state highway that existed in the far northern part of Greenville County. It connected Caesars Head State Park and Jones Gap State Park. Its path was split in two, with the continuing road entering parts of North Carolina.

== Route description ==
SC 84 began at an intersection with U.S. Route 276 (US 276) immediately south of the North Carolina state line in Caesars Head State Park northwest of Cleveland. It traveled to the east-southeast as YMCA Camp Road with a curve farther to the south until it reached the state line again. This was just over 0.2 miles (0.32 km). At the state line, the name changed to Solomon Jones Road.

Approximately 2.5 miles (4.0 km) later, Solomon Jones Road reached the state line again, where the name changed back to YMCA Camp Road. It entered Jones Gap State Park. It wound its way mostly to the east-southeast until it reached YMCA Camp Greenville, where it ended.

== History ==
SC 32 was established in 1934 or 1935. In 1947, it was decommissioned.

== Major intersections ==
County	Location	mi	km	Destinations	Notes
Greenville	Caesars Head State Park			US 276	Western terminus of SC 84 and western segment of YMCA Camp Road
North Carolina state line					
Transylvania; North Carolina	Caesars Head State Park			Solomon Jones Road east	Continuation into North Carolina
Gap in route
Transylvania; North Carolina	Jones Gap State Park			Solomon Jones Road west	Continuation into North Carolina
North Carolina state line					
Greenville	Jones Gap State Park			YMCA Camp Greenville	Eastern terminus
1.000 mi = 1.609 km; 1.000 km = 0.621 mi
