= South Carolina Highway 116 (1940s) =

Former state highway in South Carolina, United States

South Carolina Highway 116

Route information
- Maintained by SCDOT
- Existed: 1940–1947

Major junctions
- West end: US 1 in Leesville
- East end: SC 113 near Gilbert

Location
- Country: United States
- State: South Carolina
- Counties: Lexington

Highway system
- South Carolina State Highway System; Interstate; US; State; Scenic
← SC 114	→ SC 116

South Carolina Highway 116 (SC 116) was a state highway that existed entirely in the southwestern part of Lexington County, South Carolina, United States, from 1940 to 1947. It existed partially within the city limits of Leesville, now part of Batesburg–Leesville.

== Route description ==
SC 116 began at an intersection with U.S. Route 1 (US 1) in Leesville. It traveled to the southeast and reached its eastern terminus, an intersection with SC 113 (now Pond Branch Road and Juniper Springs Road) south-southeast of Gilbert.

== History ==
SC 116 was established in 1940. It was decommissioned in 1947. Its path was downgraded to a secondary road. Today, it is known as East Avenue and Pond Branch Road.

== Major intersections ==
The entire route was in Lexington County.

Location	mi	km	Destinations	Notes
Leesville			US 1	Western terminus
			SC 113	Eastern terminus; now Pond Branch Road and Juniper Springs Road
1.000 mi = 1.609 km; 1.000 km = 0.621 mi
