= South Carolina Highway 62 (1940s) =

Former state highway in South Carolina, United States

South Carolina Highway 62

Route information
- Maintained by SCDOT
- Existed: 1940–1947

Major junctions
- West end: US 76 / SC 2 near Ballentine
- SC 60 in Irmo
- East end: Lexington–Richland county line at St. Andrews

Location
- Country: United States
- State: South Carolina
- Counties: Richland, Lexington

Highway system
- South Carolina State Highway System; Interstate; US; State; Scenic
← SC 61	→ SC 63

South Carolina Highway 62 (SC 62) was a state highway that existed in the northwestern part of Richland County and the northeastern part of Lexington County. It served to connect Ballentine with St. Andrews, via Irmo.

== Route description ==
SC 62 began at an intersection with U.S. Route 76 (US 76) and SC 2 east-southeast of Ballentine. It traveled to the south-southeast to an intersection with SC 60 in Irmo. It continued its south-southeast direction and curved to a nearly due-east direction before it ended at the Lexington–Richland county line at St. Andrews.

== History ==
SC 62 was established in 1940. It was decommissioned in 1947. It was downgraded to secondary roads.

== Major intersections ==
County	Location	mi	km	Destinations	Notes
Richland				US 76 / SC 2	Western terminus
Lexington	Irmo			SC 60	
Lexington–Richland county line	St. Andrews			End of state maintenance	Eastern terminus
1.000 mi = 1.609 km; 1.000 km = 0.621 mi
