= Woodford, South Carolina =

- Town
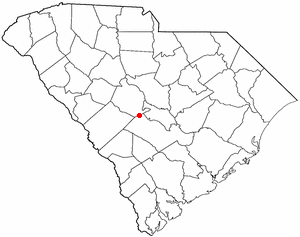
- Location in Orangeburg County, South Carolina
- Coordinates: 33°40′07″N 81°06′43″W
- Country: United States
- State: South Carolina
- County: Orangeburg

Area
  - Total: 0.78 sq mi (2.03 km^{2})
  - Land: 0.78 sq mi (2.03 km^{2})
  - Water: 0 sq mi (0.00 km^{2})
- Elevation: 377 ft (115 m)

Population (2020)
  - Total: 161
  - Density: 205.1/sq mi (79.18/km^{2})
- Time zone: UTC-5 (EST)
  - Summer (DST): UTC-4 (EDT)
- ZIP code: 29112
- Area code: 803
- FIPS code: 45-78910
- GNIS feature ID: 2406910

Woodford is a town in Orangeburg County, South Carolina, United States. As of the 2020 census, Woodford had a population of 161.

== Geography ==
According to the United States Census Bureau, the town has a total area of 0.8 square miles (2.1 km^{2}), all land.

== Demographics ==
Historical population
Census	Pop.	Note	%±
1900	205		—
1910	190		−7.3%
1920	144		−24.2%
1930	223		54.9%
1940	211		−5.4%
1950	179		−15.2%
1960	172		−3.9%
1970	195		13.4%
1980	206		5.6%
1990	200		−2.9%
2000	196		−2.0%
2010	185		−5.6%
2020	161		−13.0%
U.S. Decennial Census

=== 2020 census ===
Woodford town, South Carolina – Racial and ethnic composition Note: the US Census treats Hispanic/Latino as an ethnic category. This table excludes Latinos from the racial categories and assigns them to a separate category. Hispanics/Latinos may be of any race.
Race / Ethnicity (NH = Non-Hispanic)	Pop 2000	Pop 2010	Pop 2020	% 2000	% 2010	% 2020
White alone (NH)	94	75	71	47.96%	40.54%	44.10%
Black or African American alone (NH)	97	97	79	49.49%	52.43%	49.07%
Native American or Alaska Native alone (NH)	0	3	1	0.00%	1.62%	0.62%
Asian alone (NH)	0	0	0	0.00%	0.00%	0.00%
Native Hawaiian or Pacific Islander alone (NH)	0	0	0	0.00%	0.00%	0.00%
Other race alone (NH)	2	0	0	1.02%	0.00%	0.00%
Mixed race or Multiracial (NH)	0	0	6	0.00%	0.00%	3.73%
Hispanic or Latino (any race)	3	10	4	1.53%	5.41%	2.48%
Total	196	185	161	100.00%	100.00%	100.00%

As of the census of 2000, there were 196 people, 81 households, and 54 families residing in the town. The population density was 248.2 inhabitants per square mile (95.8/km^{2}). There were 103 housing units at an average density of 130.5 per square mile (50.4/km^{2}). The racial makeup of the town was 50.51% African American, 47.96% White, 1.02% from other races, and 0.51% from two or more races. Hispanic or Latino of any race were 1.53% of the population.

There were 81 households, out of which 23.5% had children under the age of 18 living with them, 48.1% were married couples living together, 13.6% had a female householder with no husband present, and 32.1% were non-families. 30.9% of all households were made up of individuals, and 19.8% had someone living alone who was 65 years of age or older. The average household size was 2.42 and the average family size was 3.00.

In the town, the population was spread out, with 22.4% under the age of 18, 7.7% from 18 to 24, 26.0% from 25 to 44, 25.5% from 45 to 64, and 18.4% who were 65 years of age or older. The median age was 41 years. For every 100 females, there were 90.3 males. For every 100 females age 18 and over, there were 76.7 males.

The median income for a household in the town was $24,792, and the median income for a family was $36,875. Males had a median income of $26,667 versus $19,375 for females. The per capita income for the town was $12,158. About 14.3% of families and 12.4% of the population were below the poverty line, including 10.4% of those under the age of eighteen and 31.6% of those 65 or over.
