= Bowling Green, South Carolina =

- Unincorporated community
- Location within South Carolina Location within the United States
- Coordinates: 35°08′59″N 81°12′44″W
- Country: United States
- State: South Carolina
- County: York
- Elevation: 784 ft (239 m)
- Time zone: UTC-5 (Eastern (EST))
  - Summer (DST): UTC-4 (EDT)
- ZIP code: 29703
- Area codes: 803, 839
- GNIS feature ID: 1246952

Bowling Green is an unincorporated community in York County, South Carolina, United States, along U.S. Route 321, 2.7 miles (4.3 km) north-northeast of Clover. It has a post office with ZIP code 29703.
