= Miley, South Carolina =

- Unincorporated community
- Location within South Carolina Location within the United States
- Coordinates: 32°56′53″N 81°01′54″W
- Country: United States
- State: South Carolina
- County: Hampton
- Elevation: 79 ft (24 m)
- Time zone: UTC-5 (Eastern (EST))
  - Summer (DST): UTC-4 (EDT)
- ZIP code: 29933
- Area codes: 803, 839
- GNIS feature ID: 1224494

Miley is an unincorporated community in Hampton County, South Carolina, United States. The community is located along the Hampton and Branchville Railroad, 7.1 miles (11.4 km) northeast of Hampton. Miley has a post office with ZIP code 29933.
