= Snelling, South Carolina =

- Town
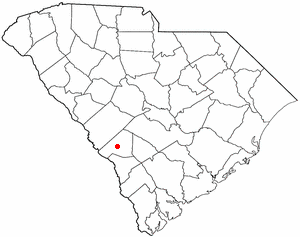
- Location of Snelling, South Carolina
- Coordinates: 33°14′45″N 81°27′43″W
- Country: United States
- State: South Carolina
- County: Barnwell

Area
  - Total: 4.08 sq mi (10.58 km^{2})
  - Land: 4.03 sq mi (10.45 km^{2})
  - Water: 0.050 sq mi (0.13 km^{2})
- Elevation: 240 ft (73 m)

Population (2020)
  - Total: 250
  - Density: 62.0/sq mi (23.92/km^{2})
- Time zone: UTC-5 (Eastern (EST))
  - Summer (DST): UTC-4 (EDT)
- ZIP code: 29812
- Area codes: 803 and 839
- FIPS code: 45-67255
- GNIS feature ID: 2407361

Snelling is a town in Barnwell County, South Carolina, United States. As of the 2020 census, Snelling had a population of 250.

== Geography ==
Snelling is located near the center of Barnwell County. South Carolina Highway 64 passes through the center of town, leading east 5 miles (8 km) to Barnwell, the county seat, and west 1 mile (2 km) to the east entrance of the Savannah River Site, a nuclear reservation.

According to the United States Census Bureau, the town has a total area of 4.1 square miles (10.6 km^{2}), of which 4.1 square miles (10.5 km^{2}) is land and 0.04 square miles (0.1 km^{2}), or 1.20%, is water.

== Demographics ==
Historical population
Census	Pop.	Note	%±
1910	338		—
1920	137		−59.5%
1930	126		−8.0%
1940	128		1.6%
1950	34		−73.4%
1960	100		194.1%
1970	150		50.0%
1980	111		−26.0%
1990	125		12.6%
2000	246		96.8%
2010	274		11.4%
2020	250		−8.8%
U.S. Decennial Census

At the 2000 census there were 246 people, 87 households, and 70 families living in the town. The population density was 79.8 inhabitants per square mile (30.8/km^{2}). There were 105 housing units at an average density of 34.1 per square mile (13.2/km^{2}). The racial makeup of the town was 78.05% White, 19.92% African American, 0.81% from other races, and 1.22% from two or more races. Hispanic or Latino of any race were 2.85%.

Of the 87 households 46.0% had children under the age of 18 living with them, 65.5% were married couples living together, 9.2% had a female householder with no husband present, and 18.4% were non-families. 16.1% of households were one person and 3.4% were one person aged 65 or older. The average household size was 2.83 and the average family size was 3.13.

The age distribution was 30.9% under the age of 18, 6.1% from 18 to 24, 33.7% from 25 to 44, 22.0% from 45 to 64, and 7.3% 65 or older. The median age was 36 years. For every 100 females, there were 108.5 males. For every 100 females age 18 and over, there were 109.9 males.

The median household income was $35,313 and the median family income was $40,139. Males had a median income of $34,286 versus $25,625 for females. The per capita income for the town was $13,420. About 6.0% of families and 9.7% of the population were below the poverty line, including 7.1% of those under the age of eighteen and 14.3% of those sixty five or over.
