= Rains, South Carolina =

Rains
- unincorporated community
- Location within the state of South Carolina
- Coordinates: 34°05′39″N 79°19′17″W
- Country: United States
- State: South Carolina
- County: Marion County

Area
  - Total: 1.34 sq mi (3.46 km^{2})
  - Land: 1.34 sq mi (3.46 km^{2})
  - Water: 0 sq mi (0.00 km^{2})
- Elevation: 75 ft (23 m)

Population (2020)
  - Total: 242
  - Density: 181.2/sq mi (69.96/km^{2})
- Time zone: UTC-5 (Eastern (EST))
  - Summer (DST): UTC-4 (EDT)
- ZIP code: 29589
- Area codes: 843, 854
- GNIS feature ID: 2812975

Rains is an unincorporated community in Marion County, South Carolina, United States. Located along US 501, 7.5 miles (12.1 km) southeast of Marion. Along the CSX Seaboard Air Line, the area is a predominantly farming community and quarry station.

The 2020 census listed a population of 242.

== Demographics ==
Historical population
Census	Pop.	Note	%±
2020	242		—
U.S. Decennial Census; 2020

Rains was first listed as a census designated place in the 2020 U.S. Census.

Rains CDP, South Carolina – Racial and ethnic composition Note: the US Census treats Hispanic/Latino as an ethnic category. This table excludes Latinos from the racial categories and assigns them to a separate category. Hispanics/Latinos may be of any race.
Race / Ethnicity (NH = Non-Hispanic)	Pop 2020	% 2020
White alone (NH)	60	24.79%
Black or African American alone (NH)	175	72.31%
Native American or Alaska Native alone (NH)	0	0.00%
Asian alone (NH)	0	0.00%
Native Hawaiian or Pacific Islander alone (NH)	0	0.00%
Other race alone (NH)	0	0.00%
Mixed race or Multiracial (NH)	6	2.48%
Hispanic or Latino (any race)	1	0.41%
Total	242	100.00%
