= White Oak Historic District =

Historic district in South Carolina, United States

- U.S. National Register of Historic Places
- U.S. Historic district
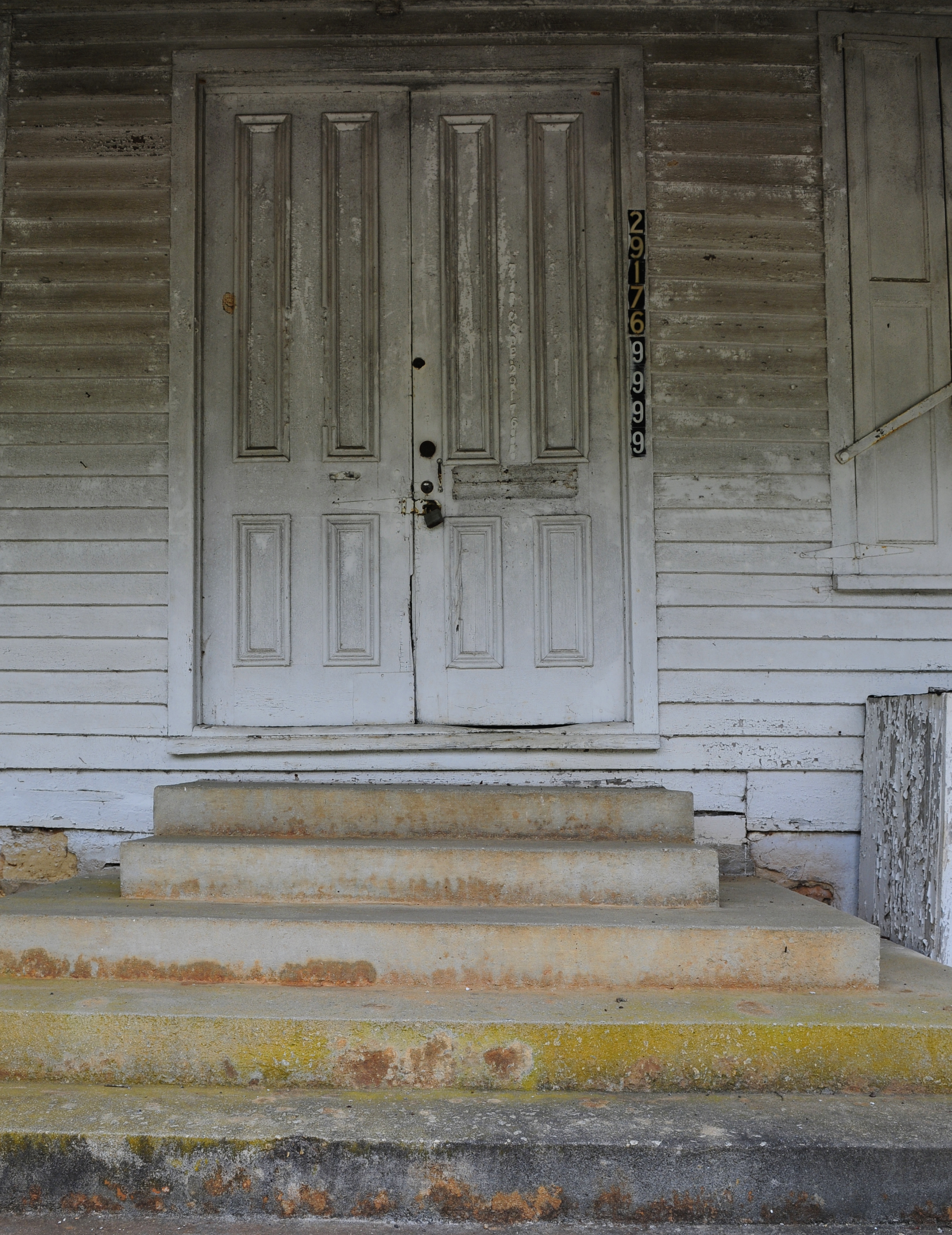
- White Oak Historic District, July 2012

- Location within South Carolina Location within the United States
- Location: Off U.S. Route 321, near Winnsboro, South Carolina
- Coordinates: 34.47396°N 81.11695°W
- Area: 15 acres (6.1 ha)
- Built: 1925
- MPS: Fairfield County MRA
- NRHP reference No.: 84000631
- Added to NRHP: December 6, 1984

White Oak Historic District is a national historic district located near Winnsboro, Fairfield County, South Carolina. The district encompasses 12 contributing buildings in the rural community of White Oak. The buildings in the district were built between about 1876 and about 1925, and includes three large frame residences (including a manse), a frame church with steeple, two frame store buildings, a cotton warehouse, and two vacant, wooded lots, some of which reflect Victorian stylistic influences. Notable buildings include the T. G. Patrick Store, McDowell's Store, White Oak Cotton Warehouse, Matthew Patrick House, T. G. Patrick House and outbuildings, and White Oak A.R.P. Church and Manse.

It was listed on the National Register of Historic Places in 1984.
