= Taxahaw, South Carolina =

Unincorporated community in South Carolina, US

Coordinates: 34°41′24″N 80°31′00″W

Taxahaw is an unincorporated community in Lancaster County, South Carolina, United States.

The "great syenite dike" extends from Hanging Rock, South Carolina through Taxahaw to the Brewer and Edgeworth mine in Chesterfield.
