= Reevesville, South Carolina =

- Town
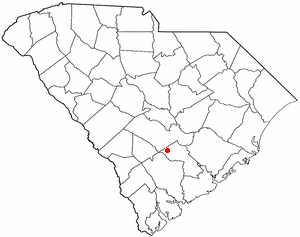
- Location of Reevesville, South Carolina
- Coordinates: 33°12′08″N 80°38′44″W
- Country: United States
- State: South Carolina
- County: Dorchester
- Organized: 1875

Area
  - Total: 1.63 sq mi (4.22 km^{2})
  - Land: 1.61 sq mi (4.17 km^{2})
  - Water: 0.019 sq mi (0.05 km^{2})
- Elevation: 105 ft (32 m)

Population (2020)
  - Total: 201
  - Density: 124.9/sq mi (48.24/km^{2})
- Time zone: UTC-5 (Eastern (EST))
  - Summer (DST): UTC-4 (EDT)
- ZIP code: 29471
- Area codes: 843, 854
- FIPS code: 45-59380
- GNIS feature ID: 2407193

Reevesville is a town in Dorchester County, South Carolina, United States. As of the 2020 census, Reevesville had a population of 201. As defined by the U.S. Office of Management and Budget, and used by the U.S. Census Bureau for statistical purposes only, Reevesville is included within the Charleston-North Charleston-Summerville metropolitan area.

== Geography ==
According to the United States Census Bureau, the town has a total area of 1.6 square miles (4.2 km^{2}), of which, 1.6 square miles (4.1 km^{2}) of it is land and 0.04 square miles (0.1 km^{2}) of it (1.23%) is water.

== History ==
Reevesville is a predominantly agrarian community situated between the banks of Cattle Creek and Polk Swamp near the Edisto River in Upper Dorchester County. The town’s name originates from its time as a once bustling railroad community known as “Reeves Station.” In 1832, the South Carolina Canal and Railroad Company constructed a rail line through the region connecting Reeves Station to Charleston.

The town is named for local farmer, David D. Reeves, who supplied wood as a source of fuel to the first locomotives to pass through the area. The Reeves name is associated with the area early as 1759 and is later noted in Robert Mills Atlas of South Carolina published in 1851.

== Demographics ==
Historical population
Census	Pop.	Note	%±
1890	109		—
1900	137		25.7%
1910	205		49.6%
1920	200		−2.4%
1930	181		−9.5%
1940	217		19.9%
1950	285		31.3%
1960	268		−6.0%
1970	247		−7.8%
1980	241		−2.4%
1990	244		1.2%
2000	207		−15.2%
2010	196		−5.3%
2020	201		2.6%
U.S. Decennial Census

As of the census of 2000, there were 207 people, 90 households, and 62 families residing in the town. The population density was 129.0 inhabitants per square mile (49.8/km^{2}). There were 114 housing units at an average density of 71.1 per square mile (27.5/km^{2}). The racial makeup of the town was 77.78% White, 21.74% African American, and 0.48% from two or more races.

There were 90 households, out of which 24.4% had children under the age of 18 living with them, 52.2% were married couples living together, 14.4% had a female householder with no husband present, and 31.1% were non-families. 28.9% of all households were made up of individuals, and 17.8% had someone living alone who was 65 years of age or older. The average household size was 2.30 and the average family size was 2.82.

In the town, the population was spread out, with 19.3% under the age of 18, 5.8% from 18 to 24, 24.2% from 25 to 44, 31.4% from 45 to 64, and 19.3% who were 65 years of age or older. The median age was 46 years. For every 100 females, there were 86.5 males. For every 100 females age 18 and over, there were 74.0 males.

The median income for a household in the town was $26,667, and the median income for a family was $38,750. Males had a median income of $31,875 versus $30,357 for females. The per capita income for the town was $17,555. About 8.8% of families and 14.0% of the population were below the poverty line, including 29.4% of those under the age of eighteen and 14.5% of those 65 or over.
