= Blair, South Carolina =

- Unincorporated community
- Location within South Carolina Location within the United States
- Coordinates: 34°25′18″N 81°23′46″W
- Country: United States
- State: South Carolina
- County: Fairfield
- Elevation: 387 ft (118 m)
- Time zone: UTC-5 (Eastern (EST))
  - Summer (DST): UTC-4 (EDT)
- ZIP code: 29015
- Area codes: 803, 839
- GNIS feature ID: 1246910

Blair is an unincorporated community in Fairfield County, South Carolina, United States. The community is located near the Broad River at the county's western border, 18 miles (29 km) west of Winnsboro. Blair has a post office with ZIP code 29015.

== History ==
The community was named after the local Blair family, who settled there in 1798.

In 1925, Blair had 25 inhabitants.
