= Jordan, South Carolina =

- Unincorporated community
- Location within South Carolina Location within the United States
- Coordinates: 33°36′22″N 80°12′32″W
- Country: United States
- State: South Carolina
- County: Clarendon
- Elevation: 121 ft (37 m)
- Time zone: UTC-5 (Eastern (EST))
  - Summer (DST): UTC-4 (EDT)
- ZIP code: 29102
- Area codes: 803, 839
- GNIS feature ID: 1223654

Jordan is an unincorporated community in Clarendon County, South Carolina, United States. The community is located along South Carolina Highway 260, 6.3 miles (10.1 km) south of Manning. Jordan does not have a post office.
