= Bristow, South Carolina =

- unincorporated community
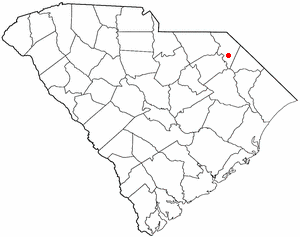
- Location of Bristow, South Carolina
- Coordinates: 34.419°N 79.618°W
- Country: United States
- State: South Carolina
- County: Marlboro
- Elevation: 128 ft (39 m)
- Time zone: UTC-5 (Eastern (EST))
  - Summer (DST): UTC-4 (EDT)
- ZIP code: 29516
- Area codes: 843, 854
- GNIS feature ID: 1231085

Bristow is an unincorporated community in Marlboro County, South Carolina, United States.

== Geography ==
Bristow is located at latitude 34.419 and longitude –79.618. The elevation is 128 feet.
