= Minturn, South Carolina =

- Unincorporated community
- Location within the state of South Carolina
- Coordinates: 34°31′02″N 79°28′20″W
- Country: United States
- State: South Carolina
- County: Dillon
- Elevation: 154 ft (47 m)
- Time zone: UTC-5 (Eastern (EST))
  - Summer (DST): UTC-4 (EDT)
- GNIS feature ID: 1246695

Minturn, South Carolina (also called Mineral Springs) is an unincorporated community in Dillon County, South Carolina, United States.

The CSX railway Andrews Subdivision passes through Minturn.

The Minturn Cotton Company operates a gin in the settlement, where it processes cotton harvested from nearby fields. The Minturn Church is also located in the settlement.

== Notable person ==
- Preston Lang Bethea - member of the South Carolina House of Representatives during 1911 and 1912.
- Kenneth Manning - author and professor at M.I.T. 1974–present
