= Leeds, South Carolina =

Unincorporated community in South Carolina, US

Coordinates: 34°37′46″N 81°23′46″W

Leeds is an unincorporated community in southwestern Chester County, South Carolina, in the Piedmont of South Carolina. Leeds is a small unincorporated community located at an elevation of around 387 feet.
