= Mitford, South Carolina =

Unincorporated community in South Carolina, US

Coordinates: 34°31′39″N 80°57′19″W

Mitford is an unincorporated community in Fairfield County, South Carolina, United States. Its altitude is 568 feet (173 m).
