= South Carolina Highway 111 (1940s) =

Former state highway in South Carolina, United States

South Carolina Highway 111

Route information
- Maintained by SCDOT
- Existed: 1940–1947

Major junctions
- South end: SC 113 in Gilbert
- US 1 near Summit
- North end: SC 386 in Ridge Crossroads

Location
- Country: United States
- State: South Carolina
- Counties: Lexington

Highway system
- South Carolina State Highway System; Interstate; US; State; Scenic
← SC 110	→ SC 113

South Carolina Highway 111 (SC 111) was a state highway that existed in the west-central part of Lexington County. It was partially in the city limits of the town of Gilbert.

== Route description ==
SC 111 began at an intersection with SC 113 (now Main Street) in Gilbert. It traveled to the west into Summit, where it curved to the west-northwest. It headed to the north-northwest and intersected U.S. Route 1 (US 1). It curved to the north-northeast and then back to the north-northwest until it met its northern terminus, an intersection with SC 386 (now Ridge Road) in Ridge Crossroads.

== History ==
SC 111 was established in 1940. It was decommissioned in 1947. It was downgraded to secondary roads. Today, it is known as Hampton Street from its southern terminus to US 1 and then Old Field Road and Cedar Grove Road from there to Ridge Crossroads.

== Major intersections ==
The entire route was in Lexington County.

Location	mi	km	Destinations	Notes
Gilbert			SC 113	Southern terminus; now Main Street
			US 1	
Ridge Crossroads			SC 386	Eastern terminus; now Ridge Road
1.000 mi = 1.609 km; 1.000 km = 0.621 mi
