= Antioch, South Carolina =

Unincorporated community in South Carolina, US

Coordinates: 34°42′10″N 80°40′36″W

Antioch is a small unincorporated community in Kershaw County, South Carolina, United States. The community lies eight miles east of Camden, just near Lee County. The community is part of the Columbia, South Carolina Metropolitan Statistical Area.

South Carolina Highway 34 and Interstate 20 are two major routes that run through the community. Exits 101 and 108 on Interstate 20 serve as access to the community.
