= Eau Claire, South Carolina =

Eau Claire
- Community
- Location within South Carolina
- Coordinates: 34°03′40″N 81°04′50″W
- Country: United States
- State: South Carolina
- County: Richland County
- Elevation: 282 ft (86 m)
- Time zone: UTC-5 (Eastern (EST))
  - Summer (DST): UTC-4 (EDT)
- ZIP code: 29203
- Area code: 803
- GNIS feature ID: 1231256

Eau Claire is a community in Columbia, South Carolina.

== Location ==
The Eau Claire community is generally bordered by North Main Street and Monticello Road to the east, River Drive and Sunset Drive to the south, the Broad River to the west, and Interstate 20 to the north.

== Etymology ==
Eau Claire derives its name from the French for "clear water".
