= Fingerville, South Carolina =

Fingerville
- CDP
- Location within the state of South Carolina
- Coordinates: 35°07′08″N 82°00′01″W
- Country: United States
- State: South Carolina
- County: Spartanburg

Area
  - Total: 0.24 sq mi (0.63 km^{2})
  - Land: 0.24 sq mi (0.63 km^{2})
  - Water: 0 sq mi (0.00 km^{2})
- Elevation: 784 ft (239 m)

Population (2020)
  - Total: 174
  - Density: 711.8/sq mi (274.84/km^{2})
- Time zone: UTC-5 (Eastern (EST))
  - Summer (DST): UTC-4 (EDT)
- ZIP codes: 29349
- FIPS code: 45083
- GNIS feature ID: 2629826

Fingerville is a Census-designated place located in Spartanburg County in the U.S. State of South Carolina. According to the 2010 United States census, the population was 134.

== History ==
A post office called Fingerville was established in 1845. The community was named for Joseph Finger, the owner of a cotton mill.

== Geography ==
Fingerville is located in the Northern part of the county.

According to the United States Census Bureau, the CDP has a total land area of 0.244 square mile (0.393 km^{2}), all land.

== Demographics ==
Historical population
Census	Pop.	Note	%±
2020	174		—
U.S. Decennial Census

== See also ==
- Place names considered unusual
