= Gayle Mill, South Carolina =

- Census-designated place
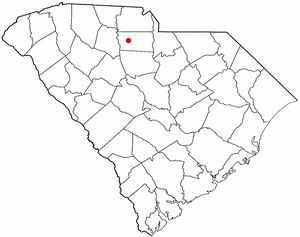
- Location of Gayle Mill, South Carolina
- Coordinates: 34°41′57″N 81°14′42″W
- Country: United States
- State: South Carolina
- County: Chester

Area
  - Total: 0.66 sq mi (1.70 km^{2})
  - Land: 0.66 sq mi (1.70 km^{2})
  - Water: 0 sq mi (0.00 km^{2})
- Elevation: 463 ft (141 m)

Population (2020)
  - Total: 866
  - Density: 1,321.8/sq mi (510.34/km^{2})
- Time zone: UTC-5 (Eastern (EST))
  - Summer (DST): UTC-4 (EDT)
- ZIP code: 29706
- Area code: 803
- FIPS code: 45-28825
- GNIS feature ID: 2402519

Gayle Mill is a census-designated place (CDP) in Chester County, South Carolina, United States. The population was 913 at the 2010 census, down from 1,094 at the 2000 census.

== Geography ==
Gayle Mill is an unincorporated suburban area on the west side of the city of Chester, the Chester County seat. U.S. Route 321, which bypasses Chester, passes from north to southeast through the center of Gayle Mill, crossing South Carolina Highway 9, which leads east into the center of the city and west towards Spartanburg.

According to the United States Census Bureau, the Gayle Mill CDP has a total area of 0.66 square miles (1.7 km^{2}), all of it land.

== Demographics ==
Historical population
Census	Pop.	Note	%±
2020	866		—
U.S. Decennial Census

As of the census of 2000, there were 1,094 people, 412 households, and 287 families residing in the CDP. The population density was 1,632.2 inhabitants per square mile (630.2/km^{2}). There were 477 housing units at an average density of 711.7 per square mile (274.8/km^{2}). The racial makeup of the CDP was 51.10% White, 47.17% African American, 0.09% Native American, 0.55% Asian, 0.09% from other races, and 1.01% from two or more races. Hispanic or Latino of any race were 0.64% of the population.

There were 412 households, out of which 37.9% had children under the age of 18 living with them, 32.3% were married couples living together, 30.6% had a female householder with no husband present, and 30.3% were non-families. 28.4% of all households were made up of individuals, and 12.4% had someone living alone who was 65 years of age or older. The average household size was 2.66 and the average family size was 3.20.

In the CDP, the population was spread out, with 33.0% under the age of 18, 11.7% from 18 to 24, 26.0% from 25 to 44, 17.7% from 45 to 64, and 11.6% who were 65 years of age or older. The median age was 30 years. For every 100 females, there were 85.4 males. For every 100 females age 18 and over, there were 81.9 males.

The median income for a household in the CDP was $25,143, and the median income for a family was $26,429. Males had a median income of $24,539 versus $12,368 for females. The per capita income for the CDP was $10,362. About 30.8% of families and 35.3% of the population were below the poverty line, including 38.3% of those under age 18 and 38.5% of those age 65 or over.
