= South Carolina Highway 105 =

State highway in South Carolina, United States

South Carolina Highway 105

Route information
- Maintained by SCDOT
- Length: 33.220 mi (53.462 km)

Major junctions
- South end: SC 49 south of Robat
- US 29 / SC 18 / SC 150 in Gaffney
- North end: I-85 in Gaffney

Location
- Country: United States
- State: South Carolina
- Counties: Union, Cherokee

Highway system
- South Carolina State Highway System; Interstate; US; State; Scenic
← SC 102	→ SC 107

South Carolina Highway 105 (SC 105) is a 33.220-mile-long (53.462 km) state highway in the U.S. state of South Carolina. The highway connects rural areas of Union and Cherokee counties.

== Route description ==
SC 105 begins at an intersection with SC 49 (Lockhart Highway) south of Robat, in rural parts of northeastern Union County. It travels to the north and almost immediately intersects SC 9 (Jonesville–Lockhart Highway). The highway gradually moves to a more westerly routing, while still traveling north. It crosses over the Pacolet River on an unnamed bridge, where it enters Cherokee County. In Saratt, it intersects SC 211 (Gowdeysville Road). The two highways travel concurrently to the east-northeast. They split in a rural area, with SC 105 traveling to the north-northwest. It goes through Wilkinsville and intersects SC 329 (Victory Trail Road). In the southern part of Gaffney, the highway begins a concurrency with SC 18 (Frederick Street) near Limestone College. The concurrency only lasts about 1,000 feet (300 m). It turns left onto Union Street, and follows that road until it meets College Drive. Then, it turns right, before turning left onto East Rutledge Avenue. It then turns left onto SC 150 (South Limestone Street). The two highways split when SC 105 turns right onto Corry Street. It then intersects U.S. Route 29 (US 29; Old Georgia Highway/South Granard Street). After a temporary departure from the city limits, where the highway passes a Freightliner plant, it meets its northern terminus, an interchange with Interstate 85. Here, the roadway continues as Hyatt Street.

Two connector routes of SC 105 exist in Cherokee County: One in Saratt carries Skull Shoals Road for 0.15 miles (0.24 km) and acts as the southern leg of the SC 105/SC 211 wye intersection; the other is located southeast of Draytonville near the intersection of SC 329, it is 0.35 miles (0.56 km) long and is a former segment of SC 105 carrying the name Wilkinsville Highway. Both are not signed with these special route numbers though the connector near Draytonville is signed as mainline southbound SC 105.

== History ==
=== South Carolina Highway 103 ===
South Carolina Highway 103
- Location: Gaffney, South Carolina
- Existed: 1937–1947

South Carolina Highway 103 (SC 103) was a state highway that was established in December 1937 from SC 11 (now SC 18) in Gaffney to what is now SC 329 southeast of the city. In 1939, its northern terminus was extended through Gaffney to the North Carolina state line north-northwest of the city. Its southern terminus was also extended to just west of the Broad River, at an intersection with the northern terminus of SC 114. The next year, its northern terminus was truncated to SC 18 in Gaffney. Its former path was redesignated as SC 150. In 1947, SC 103 was decommissioned; most of its path was redesignated as SC 105.

== Major intersections ==
County	Location	mi	km	Destinations	Notes
Union		0.000	0.000	SC 49 (Lockhart Highway) – Union, York	Southern terminus
Union	Robat	1.870	3.009	SC 9 (Jonesville–Lockhart Highway) – Jonesville, Spartanburg, Chester	
Cherokee	Saratt	10.310	16.592	SC 105 Conn. west to SC 211 – Gaffney	Eastern terminus of SC 105 Conn.
Cherokee	Saratt	10.410	16.753	SC 211 west (Gowdeysville Road) – Gaffney	Southern end of SC 211 concurrency
Cherokee		14.360	23.110	SC 211 east (Hickory Grove Road) – Hickory Grove	Northern end of SC 211 concurrency
Cherokee		23.770	38.254	SC 105 Conn. north	Southern terminus of SC 105 Conn.
Cherokee		23.940	38.528	SC 329 north (Victory Trail Road) – Blacksburg	Southern terminus of SC 329
Cherokee	Gaffney	28.480	45.834	SC 18 west (Frederick Street) – Jonesville	Southern end of SC 18 concurrency
Cherokee	Gaffney	28.800	46.349	SC 18 east (Frederick Street)	Northern end of SC 18 concurrency
Cherokee	Gaffney	29.610	47.653	SC 150 north (South Limestone Street)	Southern end of SC 150 concurrency
Cherokee	Gaffney	30.080	48.409	SC 150 south (South Limestone Street) – Pacolet	Northern end of SC 150 concurrency
Cherokee	Gaffney	30.420	48.956	US 29 (Old Georgia Highway / South Granard Street)	
Cherokee	Gaffney	33.090– 33.220	53.253– 53.462	I-85 – Spartanburg, Charlotte	Northern terminus; I-85 exit 90
1.000 mi = 1.609 km; 1.000 km = 0.621 mi: Concurrency terminus

== Special routes ==
=== Saratt connector route ===
South Carolina Highway 105 Connector
- Location: Saratt
- Length: 0.150 mi (241 m)

South Carolina Highway 105 Connector (SC 105 Conn.) is a 0.150-mile (0.241 km) connector route between SC 105 and SC 211 in Saratt, which is in the southern part of Cherokee County. SC 105, SC 105 Conn., and SC 211 come together in a triangle shape. It is an unsigned highway.

The connector begins at an intersection with SC 211. It travels to the east-northeast. It curves to the southeast and reaches its eastern terminus, an intersection with the SC 105 mainline.

=== Cherokee County connector route ===
South Carolina Highway 105 Connector
- Location: Near Draytonville
- Length: 0.350 mi (563 m)

South Carolina Highway 105 Connector (SC 105 Conn.) is a 0.350-mile-long (0.563 km) connector route that bypasses the intersection between SC 105 and SC 329 to the southwest. It is located in a rural portion of Cherokee County, at a point south-southeast of Draytonville. It is an unsigned highway.

The connector begins at an intersection with the SC 105 mainline. It travels to the west-northwest and immediately curves to the northwest. It curves to the north-northeast just before reaching its northern terminus, a second intersection with SC 105.
