= South Carolina Highway 18 =

State highway in South Carolina

South Carolina Highway 18

Route information
- Maintained by SCDOT
- Length: 39.040 mi (62.829 km)
- Existed: 1938–present

Major junctions
- West end: US 176 / SC 215 in Union
- US 29 in Gaffney; I-85 near Gaffney
- East end: NC 18 at the North Carolina state line near Blacksburg

Location
- Country: United States
- State: South Carolina
- Counties: Union, Cherokee

Highway system
- South Carolina State Highway System; Interstate; US; State; Scenic
← US 17	→ SC 19

South Carolina Highway 18 (SC 18) is a 39.040-mile (62.829 km) primary state highway in the U.S. state of South Carolina. It serves to connect the cities of Union, Gaffney and Shelby, North Carolina.

== Route description ==
SC 18 is a 39.0-mile (62.8 km) two-lane rural highway. In Gaffney, it goes through the downtown area along Fredrick Street and overlaps with the Overmountain Victory National Historic Trail.

SC 18 follows the former alignment of US 176 between Jonesville and Union. US 176 bypasses Jonesville and Union along a four lane highway to the west.

== History ==
SC 18 was established in 1938 as a renumbering of SC 111, from U.S. Route 29 (US 29) in Gaffney, to the North Carolina state line. In 1940, SC 18 was extended south along new primary routing to SC 9 in Pacolet. In 1942, it was extended again along new primary routing to SC 56 south of Glenn Springs. In 1960-1961, SC 18 was rerouted at Gaffney to US 176/SC 9 in Jonesville, replacing part of SC 11; its old alignment became part of SC 150. In 1989, SC 18 was extended to its current western terminus at US 176/SC 215, replacing part of US 176 and all of US 176 Bus.

=== South Carolina Highway 18 (1922–1938) ===
South Carolina Highway 18
- Location: Abbeville to near Long Creek
- Existed: 1922–1938

The first SC 18 was an original state highway, established in 1922 between SC 20 in Abbeville northwest to Anderson and then northwest to SC 17 in Westminster. The next year, it was extended north-northeast to SC 2 in Walhalla. Two or three years later, its Westminster–Walhalla segment was eliminated, and it was routed from Westminster to the Georgia state line northwest of Long Creek. Its former path was redesignated as SC 183. In 1933, its western terminus was truncated to Westminster, to an intersection with US 76 and SC 13. Its former path was redesignated as part of US 76. In 1938, SC 18 was redesignated as part of SC 28 from Abbeville to Anderson and SC 24 from Anderson to Westminster.

==== Antreville alternate route ====
South Carolina Highway 18 Alternate
- Location: Antreville
- Existed: 1936–1938

South Carolina Highway 18 Alternate (SC 18 Alt.) was an alternate route that existed in Antreville. It was established in November 1936 between SC 184 and SC 18 (now SC 28). In 1938, it was decommissioned and redesignated as SC 28 Alt. Today, it is a secondary road.

== Major intersections ==
County	Location	mi	km	Destinations	Notes
Union	Union	0.000	0.000	SC 215 south – Chester US 176 east – Whitmire, Newberry, Columbia US 176 west / SC 18 Truck north / SC 215 north (Duncan Bypass) – Spartanburg, Gaffney, Airport	Western terminus of SC 18; southern terminus of SC 18 Truck; Duncan Bypass provides access to Union Medical Center
Union	Union	0.070	0.113	South Pinckney Street south (SC 215 Conn. south)	Northern terminus of SC 215 Conn.; SC 215 and SC 215 Conn. share the South Pinckney Street name.
Union	Union	0.570	0.917	Union Boulevard (SC 496 west)	Eastern terminus of SC 496
Union	Union	1.750	2.816	SC 49 (Arthur Boulevard) – Union, Laurens	
Union	Union	2.400	3.862	Harwood Heights west (SC 18 Conn. west) – Buffalo	Eastern terminus of SC 18 Conn. and Harwood Heights
Union	Union	3.110	5.005	SC 18 Truck south (Connector Road / US 176 Conn. west) to US 176 – Whitmire, Rose Hill Plantation State Historic Site	Eastern terminus of US 176 Conn.; northern terminus of SC 18 Truck; provides access to Union Medical Center and Union County Airport
Union		7.020	11.298	SC 114 north (Bob Little Road) – Gaffney	Southern terminus of SC 114
Union		9.500	15.289	SC 9 south (Jonesville Highway) – Chester	Western end of SC 9 concurrency
Union	Jonesville	10.560	16.995	SC 9 north (Main Street) – Spartanburg	Eastern end of SC 9 concurrency
Union	Jonesville	10.980	17.671	Church Street west (SC 9 Conn. south)	Northern terminus of SC 9 Conn.; eastern terminus of Church Street
Union		14.570	23.448	SC 114 south (Bobby Faucette Road) – Union	Northern terminus of SC 114
Cherokee		18.090	29.113	SC 211 east (Gowdeysville Road) – Hickory Grove, York	Western end of SC 211 concurrency
Cherokee	Asbury	18.790	30.240	SC 211 west (Asbury Road)	Eastern end of SC 211 concurrency
Cherokee	Gaffney	28.740	46.253	SC 105 south (Wilkinsville Highway) – Hickory Grove	Western end of SC 105 concurrency
Cherokee	Gaffney	29.060	46.768	SC 105 north (Union Street)	Eastern end of SC 105 concurrency
Cherokee	Gaffney	30.220	48.634	SC 150 (Limestone Street) / SC 11 begins	Western end of SC 11 concurrency
Cherokee	Gaffney	30.410	48.940	US 29 (Granard Street) – Shelby, Gastonia, Spartanburg, Greenville	
Cherokee	Gaffney	30.580	49.214	SC 11 south (West Fredrick Street) – Chesnee, Spartanburg	Eastern end of SC 11 concurrency
Cherokee	Gaffney	30.650	49.326	SC 150 (Holland Street south / Providence Road north)	
Cherokee		32.500	52.304	Pleasant School Road to I-85 south – Spartanburg	
Cherokee		33.820	54.428	SC 329 south (Victory Trail Road) – Blacksburg	Northern terminus of SC 329
Cherokee		33.880– 34.007	54.525– 54.729	I-85 / Wilcox Avenue – Spartanburg, Charlotte	I-85 exit 96; access to I-85 south is via Wilcox Avenue.
Cherokee		39.040	62.829	NC 18 north – Shelby	Continuation beyond North Carolina state line
1.000 mi = 1.609 km; 1.000 km = 0.621 mi: Concurrency terminus

== Special routes ==
=== Union truck route ===
South Carolina Highway 18 Truck
- Location: Union, South Carolina
- Length: 3.980 mi (6.405 km)

South Carolina Highway 18 Truck (SC 18 Truck) is a 3.980 miles (6.405 km) truck route that travels along Duncan Bypass, in concurrency with US 176/SC 215, then reconnects with SC 18 at Connector Road.

=== Union connector route ===
South Carolina Highway 18 Connector
- Location: Union, South Carolina
- Length: 0.520 mi (837 m)

South Carolina Highway 18 Connector (SC 18 Conn) is a 0.520-mile (0.837 km) hidden designation between SC 18 and U.S. Route 176 (US 176)/SC 215, via Harwood Heights. It serves as a direct route to Buffalo from downtown Union.

=== Gaffney connector route ===
South Carolina Highway 18 Connector
- Location: Gaffney, South Carolina
- Length: 2.310 mi (3.718 km)

South Carolina Highway 18 Connector (SC 18 Conn.) is the hidden designation of Logan Street, between SC 18 and U.S. Route 29 (US 29). However, this route is signed as mainline SC 18 throughout, despite county and state maps indicating its official routing is along Limestone Street.

=== Gaffney alternate route 1 ===
South Carolina Highway 18 Alternate
- Location: Gaffney
- Existed: 1938–1940

South Carolina Highway 18 Alternate (SC 18 Alt.) was an alternate route in Gaffney. It was established in 1938 as a redesignation of SC 111 Alt. between U.S. Route 29 (US 29) and SC 18. In 1940, it was decommissioned and became part of the mainline route.

=== Gaffney alternate route 2 ===
South Carolina Highway 18 Alternate
- Location: Gaffney
- Existed: 1940–1947

South Carolina Highway 18 Alternate (SC 18 Alt.) was an alternate route in Gaffney. It was established in 1940 as a redesignation of the SC 18 mainline between Limestone Street and U.S. Route 29 (US 29). In 1947, it was decommissioned and became part of SC 18 Conn. Today, it is part of SC 18 again.
