= South Carolina Highway 112 (1940s) =

Former state highway in South Carolina, United States

South Carolina Highway 112

Route information
- Maintained by SCDOT
- Existed: 1940–1947

Major junctions
- West end: SC 215 / SC 215 Alt. in Carlisle
- US 176 from near Union to northwest of Union; SC 91 / SC 92 in Union
- East end: SC 115 in Mean Crossroads

Location
- Country: United States
- State: South Carolina
- Counties: Union

Highway system
- South Carolina State Highway System; Interstate; US; State; Scenic
← SC 110	→ SC 113

South Carolina Highway 112 (SC 112) was a state highway that existed entirely in Union. It connected Carlisle with Union.

== Route description ==
SC 112 began at an intersection with SC 215 and SC 215 Alternate (SC 215 Alt.) in Carlisle. It traveled to the northwest and met U.S. Route 176 (US 176). The two highways began a concurrency at that point. The two highways traveled to the north-northwest and entered Union. In the city, they first met the northern terminus of SC 921. Then, they met SC 92 and the western terminus of SC 91 (both now part of SC 49). Here, SC 92 joined the concurrency. In the northern part of the city, it split off, with US 176 and SC 112 heading to the west. Northwest of the city, SC 112 left the U.S. Highway and traveled to the northwest and then reached its northern terminus, an intersection with SC 115 in Mean Crossroads (southwest of Jonesville).

== History ==
SC 112 was established in 1940. It was decommissioned in 1947. Most of its path was downgraded to secondary roads. Today, it is known as Fishdam Avenue and Berry Farm Road between Carlisle and the southern end of its concurrency with US 176 and Meansville Road between Union and Mean Crossroads.

== Major intersections ==
The entire route was in Union County.

Location	mi	km	Destinations	Notes
Carlisle			SC 215 / SC 215 Alt.	Southern terminus
			US 176 east	Southern end of US 176 concurrency
Union			SC 921 south	Northern terminus of SC 921
Union			SC 91 east / SC 92 south	Southern end of SC 92 concurrency; western terminus of SC 91
Union			SC 92 north	Northern end of SC 92 concurrency
			US 176 west	Northern end of US 176 concurrency
Mean Crossroads			SC 115	Northern terminus
1.000 mi = 1.609 km; 1.000 km = 0.621 mi: Concurrency terminus
