= South Carolina Highway 112 =

South Carolina Highway 112 may refer to:

- South Carolina Highway 112 (1930s), a former state highway from New Prospect to Chesnee
- South Carolina Highway 112 (1940s), a former state highway from Carlisle to Means Crossroads
