= South Carolina Highway 49 =

State highway in South Carolina

South Carolina Highway 49

Route information
- Maintained by SCDOT
- Length: 79.516 mi (127.969 km)
- Existed: 1937–present
- Tourist routes: Western York Scenic Byway

Major junctions
- South end: US 221 in Watts Mills
- I-385 near Watts Mills; I-26 near Cross Anchor; US 176 / SC 215 in Union; US 321 in York
- North end: NC 49 at the North Carolina state line in Lake Wylie

Location
- Country: United States
- State: South Carolina
- Counties: Laurens, Spartanburg, Union, Chester, York

Highway system
- South Carolina State Highway System; Interstate; US; State; Scenic
← SC 48	→ SC 51

South Carolina Highway 49 (SC 49) is a 79.516-mile (127.969 km) primary state highway in the U.S. state of South Carolina. It is signed as a north–south highway, though it travels in a southwesterly–northeasterly direction, from Watts Mills to the North Carolina state line in Lake Wylie.

== Route description ==
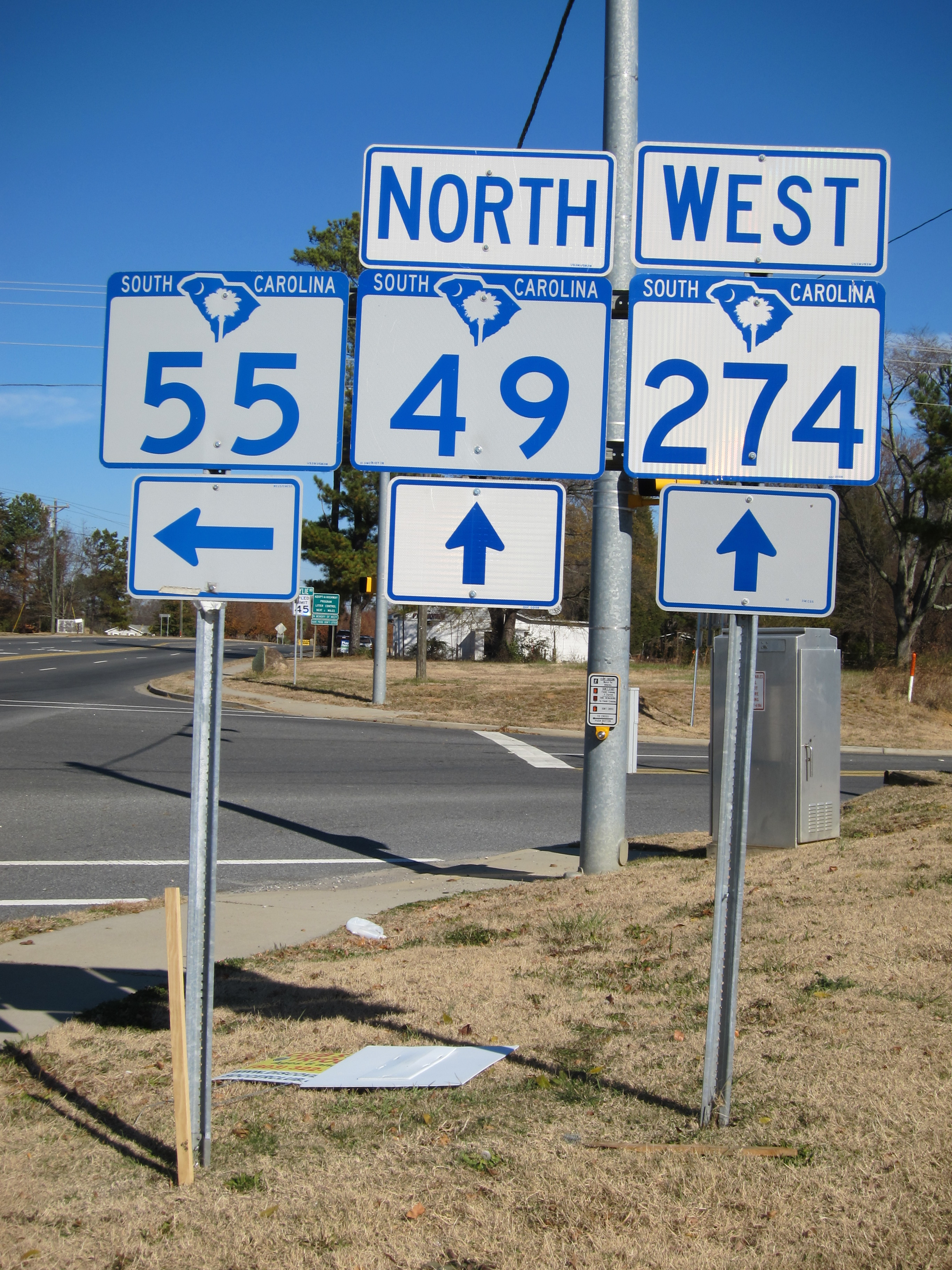
SC 49/55/274 in Lake Wylie.

SC 49 is part of a three-state highway 49 (including North Carolina Highway 49 and Virginia State Route 49) that totals 325 miles (523 km) from Watts Mills, South Carolina to Crewe, Virginia.

The portion in South Carolina runs 79 1/2 miles (127.9 km) from Watts Mills to Lake Wylie.

== History ==
Established in 1937 as a renumbering of SC 163, it traveled from U.S. Route 321 (US 321) in York to the North Carolina state line in Lake Wylie. In 1956, SC 49 was extended southwest to its current southern terminus at US 221 in Watts Mills replacing SC 91 from York to Monarch, SC 92 from Monarch to Cross Anchor, and SC 30 from Cross Anchor to Watts Mills.

In 1960 or 1961, SC 49 was rerouted from Lockhart to Mount Tabor. At an unknown date, SC 49 was rerouted north around downtown Union.

One previous SC 49 existed from around 1927–1935, from Myrtle Beach to the North Carolina state line in Little River. In 1932, most of SC 49 north of Myrtle Beach was replaced by US 117; by 1935, the rest of SC 49 (and US 117) was replaced by US 17.

== Major intersections ==
County	Location	mi	km	Destinations	Notes
Laurens	Watts Mills	0.000	0.000	US 221 (Lucas Avenue) – Laurens, Woodruff	Southern terminus
Laurens		2.530	4.072	I-385 – Columbia, Greenville	I-385 exit 5
Laurens		4.840	7.789	SC 308 – Clinton	
Spartanburg		9.353	15.052	I-26 – Columbia, Spartanburg	I-26 exit 44
Spartanburg		10.400	16.737	SC 92 west – Enoree	Eastern terminus of SC 92
Spartanburg	Cross Anchor	12.590	20.262	SC 56 – Woodruff, Clinton	
Union	Union	27.750	44.659	SC 496 east (Industrial Park Road/SC 49 Truck)	Western terminus of SC 496 and southern terminus of SC 49 Truck
Union	Union	28.430	45.754	US 176 east / SC 215 south (Duncan Bypass/SC 49 Truck) / West Main Street – Whitmire	South end of US 176/SC 215 overlap and northern terminus of SC 49 Truck
Union	Union	29.180	46.961	US 176 west / SC 215 north (Duncan Bypass) / Rice Avenue – Spartanburg	Northern end of US 176 and SC 215 overlap
Union	Union	29.970	48.232	SC 18 (Thompson Boulevard) – Jonesville, Union	
Union	Monarch Mill	32.090	51.644	SC 49 Conn. south (Monarch Avenue) – Carlisle	Northern terminus of SC 49 Connector
Union		39.010	62.781	SC 105 north (Mount Tabor Church Road)	Southern terminus of SC 105
Union	Lockhart	41.540	66.852	SC 9 north (Jonesville-Lockhart Highway) – Jonesville	Southern end of SC 9 overlap
Chester		42.250	67.995	SC 9 south (Pinckney Road)	Northern end of SC 9 overlap
York	Bullock Creek	47.480	76.412	SC 322 east (McConnells Highway) – McConnells	Western terminus of SC 322
York		50.550	81.352	SC 97 – Hopewell	
York	Sharon	55.940	90.027	SC 211 north (Hickory Grove Road) – Hickory Grove	Southern terminus of SC 211
York	York	61.940	99.683	US 321 – Gastonia	
York	York	62.310	100.278	US 321 Bus. south (Congress Street) – Chester	Southern end of US 321 Bus. overlap
York	York	62.830	101.115	SC 5 Bus. / SC 161 Bus. (Liberty Street)	
York	York	63.210	101.727	US 321 Bus. north (Kings Mountain Street) – Gastonia	Northern end of US 321 Bus. overlap
York	York	64.826	104.327	SC 5 / SC 161 – Rock Hill, Blacksburg	
York		74.146	119.326	SC 274 east (Hands Mill Highway) – Rock Hill	Southern end of SC 274 overlap
York		74.346	119.648	SC 55 west – Clover	Eastern terminus of SC 55
York	Lake Wylie	76.396	122.947	SC 274 west / SC 557 south – Clover, Gastonia	Northern end of SC 274 overlap; eastern terminus of SC 557
Catawba River / Lake Wylie		79.516	127.969	NC 49 north (York Road) – Charlotte	Northern terminus
Catawba River / Lake Wylie		79.516	127.969	Buster Boyd Bridge; South Carolina–North Carolina state line	
1.000 mi = 1.609 km; 1.000 km = 0.621 mi: Concurrency terminus

== Special routes ==
=== Union truck route ===
South Carolina Highway 49 Truck
- Location: Union, South Carolina
- Length: 1.790 mi (2.881 km)

South Carolina Highway 49 Truck (SC 49 Truck) is a 1.790-mile (2.881 km) truck route that bypasses a portion of West Main Street (SC 49) in western portions of Union. The first 0.760 miles (1.223 km) of the highway travels along the two-lane Industrial Park Road, concurrent with the unsigned designation of SC 496. It then turns to the north-northwest along US 176/SC 18 Truck/SC 215 (Duncan Bypass) for its last 1.030 miles (1.658 km).

The entire route is in Union, Union County.

mi	km	Destinations	Notes
0.000	0.000	SC 49 / Industrial Park Road north	Western end of SC 496 concurrency; western terminus of SC 49 Truck and SC 496
0.770	1.239	Duncan Bypass south (US 176 east / SC 18 Truck south / SC 215 south) / Main Street east (SC 496 east)	Eastern end of SC 496 concurrency; western end of US 176/SC 18 Truck/SC 215 concurrency
1.790	2.881	SC 49 south (West Main Street west) – Laurens US 176 west / SC 18 Truck north / SC 215 north / SC 49 north (Duncan Bypass north) – Spartanburg; West Main Street east – Union	Eastern end of US 176/SC 18 Truck/SC 215 concurrency; eastern terminus; provides access to Union Medical Center
1.000 mi = 1.609 km; 1.000 km = 0.621 mi: Concurrency terminus

=== Monarch Mill connector route ===
South Carolina Highway 49 Connector
- Location: Monarch Mill, South Carolina
- Length: 3.090 mi (4.973 km)

South Carolina Highway 49 Connector (SC 49 Conn.) is a 3.090-mile-long (4.973 km) connector route along Monarch Highway between SC 215 southeast of Union to SC 49 in the census-designated place of Monarch Mill.
