= South Carolina Highway 115 =

State highway in South Carolina

South Carolina Highway 115

Route information
- Maintained by SCDOT
- Existed: 1940–1947

Major junctions
- South end: US 176 in West Springs
- SC 112 in Mean Crossroads
- North end: SC 9 in Jonesville

Location
- Country: United States
- State: South Carolina
- Counties: Union

Highway system
- South Carolina State Highway System; Interstate; US; State; Scenic
← SC 114	→ SC 116

South Carolina Highway 115 (SC 115) was a state highway that existed entirely in the northwestern part of Union. It connected West Springs with Jonesville.

== Route description ==
SC 115 began at an intersection with U.S. Route 176 (US 176; now SC 215) in West Springs. It traveled to the northeast and met SC 112 (now Meansville Road) in Mean Crossroads. It continued to the northeast and reached its northern terminus, an intersection with SC 9 in Jonesville.

== History ==
SC 115 was established in 1939 on a path from about 5 miles (8.0 km) southwest of Jonesville to SC 9 in that town. The next year, it was extended to its southern terminus in West Springs. It was decommissioned in 1947. Its path was downgraded to secondary roads. Today, it is known as West Springs Highway.

== Major intersections ==
The entire route was in Union County.

Location	mi	km	Destinations	Notes
West Springs			US 176	Southern terminus; now SC 215
Mean Crossroads			SC 112 south	Northern terminus of SC 112; now Meansville Road
Jonesville			SC 9	Northern terminus
1.000 mi = 1.609 km; 1.000 km = 0.621 mi
