= SC 11 =

SC 11, SC-11, SC.11, SC11 or variants may refer to:

- SC 11, South Carolina Highway 11
- SC11, a FIPS 10-4 region code, see List of FIPS region codes (S–U)
- SC-11, a subdivision code for the Seychelles, see ISO 3166-2:SC
- (17457) 1990 SC11, an asteroid
