= South Carolina Highway 110 =

State highway in South Carolina, United States

South Carolina Highway 110
- Battleground Road

Route information
- Maintained by SCDOT
- Length: 9.280 mi (14.935 km)
- Existed: 1949–present
- Tourist routes: Cowpens N.B. Scenic Byway

Major junctions
- West end: US 29 in Cowpens
- I-85 near Cowpens
- East end: US 221 Alt. / SC 11 near Chesnee

Location
- Country: United States
- State: South Carolina
- Counties: Spartanburg, Cherokee

Highway system
- South Carolina State Highway System; Interstate; US; State; Scenic
← SC 109	→ SC 113

South Carolina Highway 110 (SC 110) is a state highway in the U.S. state of South Carolina that travels 9.280 miles (14.935 km) from US 29 in Cowpens to US 221 Alt and SC 11 at Cowpens National Battlefield near Chesnee. It is signed and internally designated as an east–west highway though it runs north–south physically.

== Route description ==
SC 110 is a two-lane rural highway with relatively few intersections. The highway is named Battleground Road for the entire length. A section east of Mayo is also known as Cowpens Highway. The highway passes next to and ends at Cowpens National Battlefield.

== History ==
The original SC 110 was created in 1936, running from US 221 in Chesnee north to the North Carolina border, where the road became the now-defunct NC 741. In 1942, the highway was renumbered as a part of US 221. The highway was resurrected in 1949 in its near-current form. When US 29, now I-85, was established in the mid-1950s, the highway was rerouted slightly to the west.

== Junction list ==
County	Location	mi	km	Destinations	Notes
Spartanburg	Cowpens	0.000	0.000	US 29 (North Main Street) – Spartanburg, Gaffney	Western terminus
Spartanburg	Cowpens	0.170	0.274	Moore Street east to US 29 north	Western terminus of Moore Street
Spartanburg		1.390	2.237	Edgefield Road north to I-85 north – Charlotte	Southern terminus of Edgefield Road
Spartanburg		1.730	2.784	Bud Arthur Bridge Road to I-85 north – Charlotte	
Spartanburg		2.060	3.315	Dewberry Road west / Phillips Drive east to I-85 south – Spartanburg	Eastern terminus of Dewberry Road; western terminus of Phillips Drive
Spartanburg		2.210	3.557	Horry Road south to I-85 south – Spartanburg	Northern terminus of Horry Road
Cherokee	Cowpens National Battlefield	9.280	14.935	US 221 Alt. south / SC 11 south (Cherokee Foothills Scenic Highway / Overmountain Victory National Historic Trail) – Chesnee US 221 Alt. north – Forest City SC 11 north (Cherokee Foothills Scenic Highway / Overmountain Victory National Historic Trail) – Gaffney, Cowpens National Battlefield	Eastern terminus
1.000 mi = 1.609 km; 1.000 km = 0.621 mi
