= South Carolina Highway 211 =

State highway in South Carolina

South Carolina Highway 211

Route information
- Maintained by SCDOT
- Length: 27.380 mi (44.064 km)
- Existed: 1942–present
- Tourist routes: Western York Scenic Byway

Major junctions
- West end: SC 150 near Pacolet
- East end: SC 49 in Sharon

Location
- Country: United States
- State: South Carolina
- Counties: Cherokee, York

Highway system
- South Carolina State Highway System; Interstate; US; State; Scenic
← SC 210	→ SC 212

South Carolina Highway 211 (SC 211) is a 27.380-mile (44.064 km) primary state highway in the U.S. state of South Carolina. The highway serves the rural areas of southern Cherokee and western York counties.

== Route description ==
SC 211 begins at an intersection with SC 150, north of Pacolet in Cherokee County, going easterly along Asbury Road to Asbury, where it connects with SC 18. Splitting from SC 18 onto Gowdeysville Road, it connects with SC 105 in Saratt. Solo again, when it splits from SC 105 with Hickory Grove Road, it crosses the Broad River and into York County. At Hickory Grove, it connects briefly with SC 97, before continuing southeasterly to Sharon, where it ends at an intersection with SC 49.

== History ==
SC 211 was established by 1942 as a renumbering of part of SC 105, from SC 105 to SC 5 in Hickory Grove. In 1951–52, SC 211 was extended east to its current eastern terminus with SC 91 in Sharon, replacing part of SC 5. In 1955–56, SC 211 was extended west to its current western terminus with SC 18 (later becoming SC 150), replacing SC 98. This is the third and current version of SC 211.

The first SC 211 existed between 1925 and 1928, traveling between SC 21 in Travelers Rest, to the North Carolina state line at Caesars Head. It was renumbered as SC 284, later becoming part of US 276.

The second SC 211 existed between 1928 and 1942, initially traveling between US 21 in Fort Mill, and SC 26 in Indian Land. In 1939 it was extended to the North Carolina state line. In 1941 or 1942, it was renumbered to SC 160.

=== South Carolina Highway 73 ===
South Carolina Highway 73
- Location: Fort Mill–Indian Land, South Carolina
- Existed: c.1926–1928

South Carolina Highway 73 (SC 73) was a state highway that was established about 1926 on a path from SC 7 (now U.S. Route 21 Business) in Fort Mill to SC 26 (now US 521) in Indian Land. In 1928, this was decommissioned and redesignated as the second SC 211. Today, this highway is part of SC 160.

== Major intersections ==
County	Location	mi	km	Destinations	Notes
Cherokee		0.000	0.000	SC 150 (Pacolet Highway) – Gaffney, Pacolet	Western terminus
Cherokee	Asbury	5.480	8.819	SC 18 east (Union Highway) – Gaffney	Western end of SC 18 concurrency
Cherokee		6.180	9.946	SC 18 west (Union Highway) – Union	Eastern end of SC 18 concurrency
Cherokee	Saratt	11.630	18.717	SC 105 Conn. east (Skull Shoals Road) to SC 105 south – Lockhart	Western terminus of SC 105 Conn.
Cherokee	Saratt	11.730	18.878	SC 105 south – Lockhart	Western end of SC 105 concurrency
Cherokee		15.680	25.235	SC 105 north (Wilkinsville Highway) – Wilkinsville, Gaffney	Eastern end of SC 105 concurrency
York	Hickory Grove	21.420	34.472	SC 97 south (Hopewell Road) – Hopewell	Western end of SC 97 concurrency
York	Hickory Grove	21.820	35.116	SC 97 north (Wylie Avenue) – Smyrna, Blacksburg	Eastern end of SC 97 concurrency
York	Sharon	27.380	44.064	SC 49 (York Street) – Lockhart, Union, York, Gastonia	Eastern terminus
1.000 mi = 1.609 km; 1.000 km = 0.621 mi: Concurrency terminus
