= South Carolina Highway 150 =

State highway in South Carolina, United States

South Carolina Highway 150

Route information
- Maintained by SCDOT
- Length: 33.580 mi (54.042 km)
- Existed: 1940–present

Major junctions
- West end: SC 56 near Glenn Springs
- US 176 in Pacolet; US 29 in Gaffney
- East end: NC 150 at the North Carolina state line near Boiling Springs, NC

Location
- Country: United States
- State: South Carolina
- Counties: Spartanburg, Cherokee

Highway system
- South Carolina State Highway System; Interstate; US; State; Scenic
← SC 146	→ SC 151

South Carolina Highway 150 (SC 150) is a 33.580-mile (54.042 km) primary state highway in the U.S. state of South Carolina. The highway connects Pacolet and Gaffney with the more rural areas of Spartanburg and Cherokee counties.

== Route description ==
SC 150 is a 33-mile (53 km) two-lane rural highway. In Gaffney, it goes through the downtown area along Limestone Street and overlaps with the Overmountain Victory National Historic Trail.

== History ==
SC 150 was established in 1940 as a renumbering of part of SC 103, from SC 18 in Gaffney to the North Carolina state line. In 1960-61, SC 150 was extended south to its current southern terminus at SC 56, replacing part of SC 18.

== Major intersections ==
County	Location	mi	km	Destinations	Notes
Spartanburg		0.000	0.000	SC 56 – Cross Anchor, Clinton, Spartanburg	Southern terminus
Spartanburg	Glenn Springs	1.560	2.511	SC 215 – Union, Spartanburg	
Spartanburg	Pacolet	9.460	15.224	US 176 – Union, Spartanburg	
Spartanburg	Pacolet	10.310	16.592	SC 9 (Pine Street) – Union, Spartanburg	
Spartanburg	Pacolet			Victor Park north (SC 150 Truck north) – Town hall, Museum, Amphitheater and Nature Trail, Pacolet River	Southern terminus of SC 150 Truck and Victor Park; SC 150 turns right.
Spartanburg	Pacolet			SC 150 Truck south (Sunny Acres Road west)	Northern terminus of SC 150 Truck; eastern terminus of Sunny Acres Road
Cherokee		15.100	24.301	SC 211 (Asbury Road) – Asbury	
Cherokee	Gaffney	24.250	39.027	SC 105 north (Corry Street)	Southern end of SC 105 concurrency; to Gaffney Premium Outlets
Cherokee	Gaffney	24.720	39.783	SC 105 south (Rutledge Avenue)	Northern end of SC 105 concurrency
Cherokee	Gaffney	25.370	40.829	SC 11 south / SC 18 (Frederick Street) – Union, Chesnee	Northern terminus of SC 11
Cherokee	Gaffney			US 29 (Cherokee Avenue) – Blacksburg, Spartanburg, Greenville	
Cherokee	Gaffney	25.970	41.795	SC 18 Conn. (North Logan Street)	
Cherokee		33.580	54.042	NC 150 north – Boiling Springs	Continuation beyond North Carolina state line
1.000 mi = 1.609 km; 1.000 km = 0.621 mi: Concurrency terminus

== Pacolet truck route ==
South Carolina Highway 150 Truck
- Location: Pacolet, South Carolina
- Length: 0.570 mi (917 m)

South Carolina Highway 150 Truck (SC 150 Truck) is a 0.570-mile (0.917 km) truck route that is partially within the city limits of Pacolet. It is almost entirely unsigned. Except for one sign on SC 150 at its northern terminus, it is only signed at turns and come curves as the SC 150 mainline. It is known as Victor Park and Sunny Acres Road.

It begins at an intersection with the SC 150 mainline (Stone Street) in the northeastern part of Pacolet. It travels to the north-northeast and immediately leaves the city limits of the town. The highway curves to the north-northwest and briefly re-enters the city limits. Here, it has an intersection with Sunny Acres Road. Here, Victor Park ends, and the truck route turns right. It departs the city limits again and takes Sunny Acres Road to the east-northeast. Upon encountering the Pacolet Mills Cloth Room and Warehouse, it curves to a nearly due-north direction and reaches its northern terminus, another intersection with the SC 150 mainline (Montgomery Avenue / Limestone Street).

The entire route is in Spartanburg County.

Location	mi	km	Destinations	Notes
Pacolet	0.000	0.000	SC 150 (Stone Street east) – Business district	Southern terminus of SC 150 Truck; western terminus of Stone Street
	0.570	0.917	SC 150 (Montgomery Avenue south / Limestone Street north) – Pacolet, Gaffney	Northern terminus of SC 150 Truck and Montgomery Avenue; eastern terminus of Sunny Acres Road; southern terminus of Limestone Street
1.000 mi = 1.609 km; 1.000 km = 0.621 mi
