= Woodland Plantation =

Woodland Plantation may refer to:

in the United States

- Woodland Plantation (West Pointe a la Hache, Louisiana), listed on the NRHP in Louisiana
- Woodland Plantation in LaPlace, Louisiana; played a role in the 1811 German Coast uprising; birthplace of Kid Ory
- Woodland Plantation (Church Hill, Mississippi), listed on the NRHP in Mississippi
- Woodland Plantation (Carlisle, South Carolina), listed on the NRHP in South Carolina
