= Brannons Store, South Carolina =

- ghost town
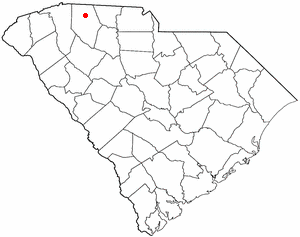
- Location of Brannons Store, South Carolina
- Coordinates: 35°04′48.4″N 82°01′27.4″W
- Country: United States
- State: South Carolina
- County: Spartanburg
- Elevation: 938 ft (286 m)
- Time zone: UTC-5 (Eastern (EST))
  - Summer (DST): UTC-4 (EDT)
- ZIP code: 29349
- Area codes: 864, 821
- GNIS feature ID: 1248128

Brannons Store (also known as Brannon) is a ghost town in Spartanburg County, in the U.S. state of South Carolina. It was located between Inman and New Prospect.

== History ==
A post office called Brannons was established in 1888, and remained in operation until 1902. J. A. Brannon, the local storekeeper and postmaster, gave the community his name.
