= South Carolina Highway 11 =

State highway in South Carolina

South Carolina Highway 11
- Cherokee Foothills National Scenic Highway

Route information
- Maintained by SCDOT
- Length: 119.850 mi (192.880 km)
- Existed: 1922–present
- Tourist routes: Cherokee Foothills Scenic Highway; South Carolina Heritage Corridor: Nature Route; SC Heritage Corridor: Discovery Route

Major junctions
- South end: I-85 outside of Fair Play
- US 76 / US 123 near Westminster; US 178 near Sunset; US 276 in Cleveland; US 25 near Travelers Rest; US 176 in Campobello; I-26 near Campobello; US 221 / US 221 Alt. in Chesnee; I-85 in Gaffney; US 29 in Gaffney
- North end: SC 18 / SC 150 in Gaffney

Location
- Country: United States
- State: South Carolina
- Counties: Oconee, Pickens, Greenville, Spartanburg, Cherokee

Highway system
- South Carolina State Highway System; Interstate; US; State; Scenic
← SC 10	→ SC 12

South Carolina Highway 11 (SC 11), also known as the Cherokee Foothills Scenic Highway, is a 119.850-mile (192.880 km) state highway through the far northern part of the U.S. state of South Carolina, following the southernmost peaks of the Blue Ridge Mountains. The route is surrounded by peach orchards, quaint villages, and parks. It is an alternative to Interstate 85 (I-85) and has been featured by such publications as National Geographic, Rand McNally, and Southern Living.

== Route description ==
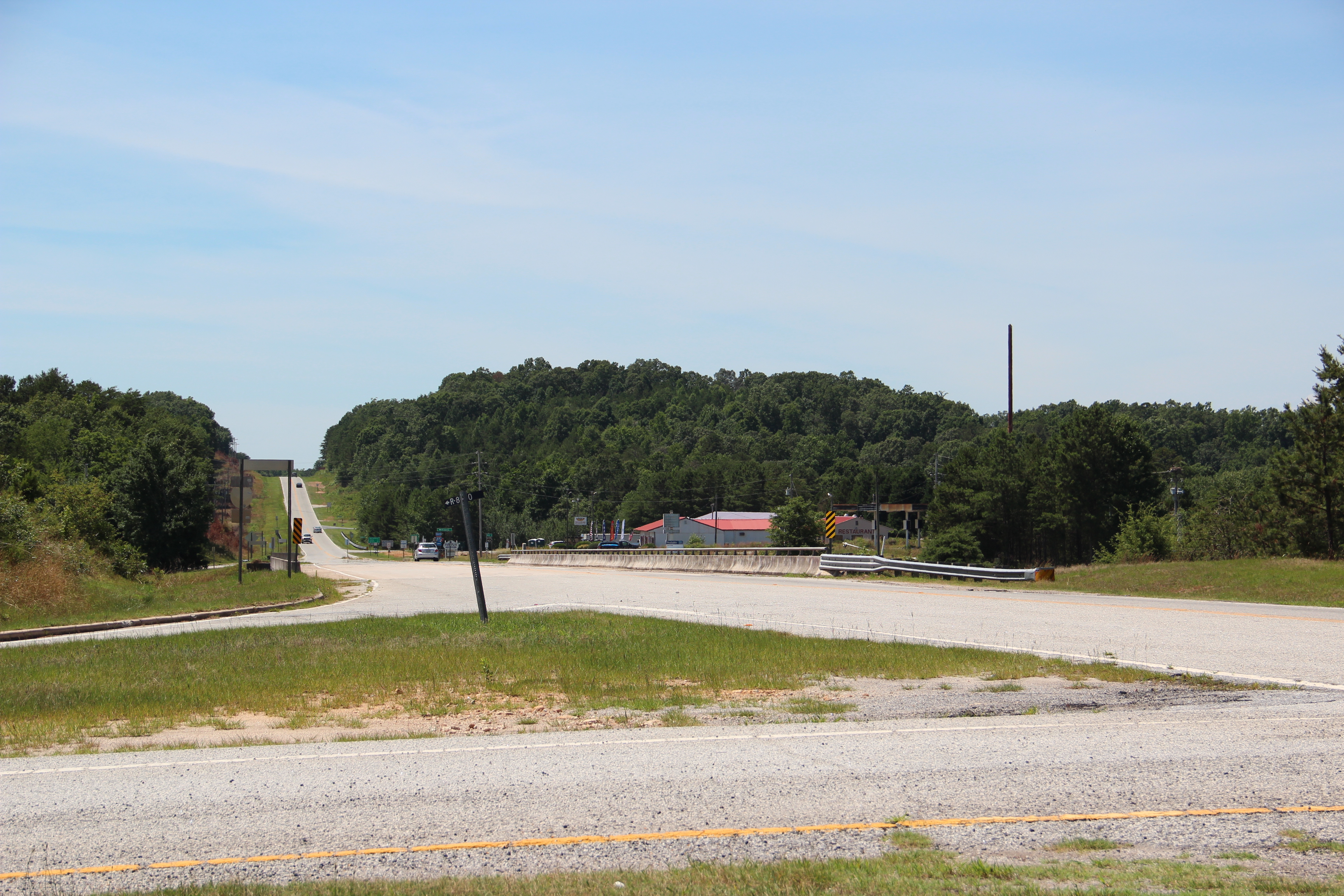
Southern terminus of Highway 11 in Oconee County

SC 11 is located entirely within the U.S. state of South Carolina, beginning in southern Oconee County as Exit 1 of Interstate 85, 0.6 mi (1 km) from the South Carolina and Georgia border. After Oconee County, Highway 11 enters northern Pickens County, where bridges carry it over Lake Keowee and it passes near Table Rock State Park before it leaves the county. Next comes Greenville County, where Highway 11 runs together with U.S. Highway 276 for several miles near Cleveland before splitting off on a more westerly route and crossing U.S. Highway 25 near Tigerville. Highway 11 then enters northern Spartanburg County, where it has an interchange with Interstate 26 near Campobello and Landrum. Finally, Highway 11 passes into Cherokee County, crossing Interstate 85 near Gaffney and ending shortly thereafter.

== History ==
The current highway was once part of the "Cherokee Path" or "Keowee Path," this road was the route used by the Cherokee Indians and the English and French fur traders and stretched from Tennessee to Charleston, South Carolina. This National Scenic Byway winds its way through Upstate South Carolina and passes through some towns, such as Walhalla, Salem, Marietta, Campobello, Chesnee, and Gaffney. Echoes of the area's Cherokee heritage can still be heard in places and river names like Seneca, Savannah, Keowee, Jocassee, Enoree, Toxaway, Tugaloo, Tokena, and Eastatoee.

In the city of Gaffney, east of I-85, SC 11 is known as "Floyd Baker Boulevard," which is a well-known street name in Upstate South Carolina. This section of SC 11 is a vast contrast to the rest of the route. At this point the highway becomes heavily congested and developed. Gaffney is also the biggest town along the route.

=== South Carolina Highway 112 ===
South Carolina Highway 112
- Location: New Prospect–Chesnee, South Carolina
- Existed: 1936–1939

South Carolina Highway 112 (SC 112) was a state highway that was established in July 1936 on a path from SC 9 in New Prospect to U.S. Route 221 (US 221) and SC 110 in Chesnee. In 1939, it was decommissioned, with most of its path redesignated as part of SC 11.

== Major intersections ==
County	Location	mi	km	Destinations	Notes
Oconee		0.000– 0.090	0.000– 0.145	I-85 – Atlanta, Greenville	I-85 exit 1; southern terminus
Oconee		9.840	15.836	SC 24 – Westminster, Townville	Interchange
Oconee		13.199– 13.200	21.242– 21.243	US 76 / US 123 – Westminster, Seneca	Interchange
Oconee	West Union	19.562– 19.600	31.482– 31.543	SC 28 (Blue Ridge Boulevard) – Walhalla, Highlands, Cashiers, Seneca, Oconee State Park, St. John's Lutheran Church	Interchange
Oconee		23.770– 23.775	38.254– 38.262	SC 183 / Christophers Road – Walhalla, High Falls County Park, World of Energy	Interchange
Oconee		32.570	52.416	SC 130 – Whitewater Falls, Cashiers, Salem, Camp Buc, Bad Creek Project, World of Energy	
Pickens	Keowee-Toxaway State Park	38.820	62.475	SC 133 south (Crowe Creek Road) – Six Mile, Clemson, Mile Creek County Park	
Pickens		47.350	76.202	US 178 (Moorefield Memorial Highway) – Rosman, Pickens, Sassafras Mountain, Camp Hannon, McCall RA Camp, Hagood Mill	
Pickens		56.280	90.574	SC 8 south (Pumpkintown Highway) – Easley, Pickens	Southern end of SC 8 concurrency
Pickens		56.870	91.523	SC 8 north (Ceasars Head Highway) – Asbury Hills Camp, Caesars Head State Park, YMCA Camp Greenville	Northern end of SC 8 concurrency
Greenville		58.260	93.760	US 276 west (Geer Highway) – Caesars Head, Asbury Hills Camp, Caesars Head State Park, YMCA Camp Greenville	Southern end of US 276 concurrency
Greenville	Cleveland	63.780	102.644	US 276 east (Greer Highway) – Marietta, Travelers Rest	Northern end of US 276 concurrency
Greenville	Lima	68.125– 68.130	109.637– 109.645	US 25 to I-26 – Greenville, Hendersonville	Interchange
Greenville		74.630	120.105	SC 101 south / S-23-912 – Greer, Blue Ridge Christian Academy, Poinsett Bridge Heritage Preserve	
Greenville	Gowensville	82.210	132.304	SC 14 – Landrum, Greer, North Greenville University	
Spartanburg	Campobello	86.320	138.919	US 176 (North Main Street) – Landrum, Spartanburg	
Spartanburg		89.780– 89.787	144.487– 144.498	I-26 – Asheville, Columbia	I-26 exit 5
Spartanburg	New Prospect	93.490	150.458	SC 9 – Mill Spring, Spartanburg	
Spartanburg	Chesnee	105.630	169.995	US 221 (Alabama Avenue) – Rutherfordton, Spartanburg	Southern end of US 221 Alt. concurrency
Cherokee	Cowpens NB	107.950	173.729	US 221 Alt. north (Cliffside Highway) / SC 110 west (Battleground Road) – Forest City, Cowpens	Northern end of US 221 Alt. concurrency
Cherokee	Gaffney	117.893	189.730	I-85 – Charlotte, Spartanburg	I-85 exit 92
Cherokee	Gaffney	119.680	192.606	Logan Street (SC 18 Conn.)	
Cherokee	Gaffney	119.760	192.735	US 29 (North Granard Street)	
Cherokee	Gaffney	119.850	192.880	SC 18 west (Frederick Street) / SC 150 (Limestone Street) – Union	Northern end of SC 18 concurrency; northern terminus
1.000 mi = 1.609 km; 1.000 km = 0.621 mi: Concurrency terminus

== Special routes ==
=== Salem business loop ===
South Carolina Highway 11 Business
- Location: Salem, South Carolina
- Existed: 1971–1976

South Carolina Highway 11 Business (SC 11 Bus.) was a business route in Salem. It was established in 1971 from SC 11 west-northwest of the town to SC 11 north-northeast of the town. In 1976, it was decommissioned and was mostly downgraded to secondary roads, with the exception of a small portion of SC 130, which had been extended into Salem by this time.

=== Chesnee alternate route ===
South Carolina Highway 11 Alternate
- Location: Chesnee, South Carolina
- Existed: c. 1940–present

South Carolina Highway 11 Alternate (SC 11 Alt.) was an alternate route east of Chesnee. It was commissioned by 1940 between SC 11 and U.S. Route 221 (US 221; now US 221 Alternate) in the northwestern part of the Cowpens National Battlefield. At an unknown date, it was decommissioned and downgraded to a secondary road. It is now known as Edsel Drive.
