= Buffalo Mill Historic District =

Historic district in South Carolina, United States

- U.S. National Register of Historic Places
- U.S. Historic district
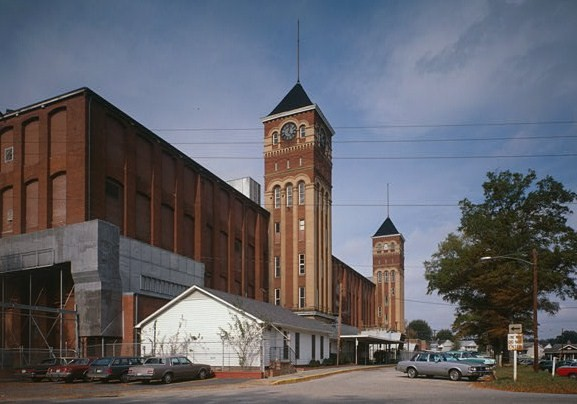
- Buffalo Cotton Textile Mill, HABS Photo, November 1986

- Location within South Carolina Location within the United States
- Location: Village of Buffalo and immediate surroundings, Buffalo, South Carolina
- Coordinates: 34°43′23″N 81°40′39″W
- Area: 200.6 acres (81.2 ha)
- Built: 1929
- Architect: Whaley, W.B. Smith,& Co.
- Architectural style: Romanesque, Late 19th And Early 20th Century American Movements
- MPS: Textile Mills designed by W.B. Smith Whaley MPS
- NRHP reference No.: 90001506
- Added to NRHP: October 10, 1990

Buffalo Mill Historic District is a national historic district located at Buffalo, Union County, South Carolina. The district encompasses 190 contributing buildings and 2 contributing structures associated with the Buffalo Mill textile mill complex and mill village. The mill complex includes the main mill, mill office, power house, ice factory, mill warehouse, company store, and company bank/drug store. The main mill building features applied stylized Romanesque Revival detailing. The mill village housing varies from large, free-classic, Queen Anne style supervisor's houses, to shingle-style bungalows, to simple, one-story, workers residences. The village also includes a school and a baseball field/park.

It was added to the National Register of Historic Places in 1990.
