= Cleveland, South Carolina =

- Unincorporated community
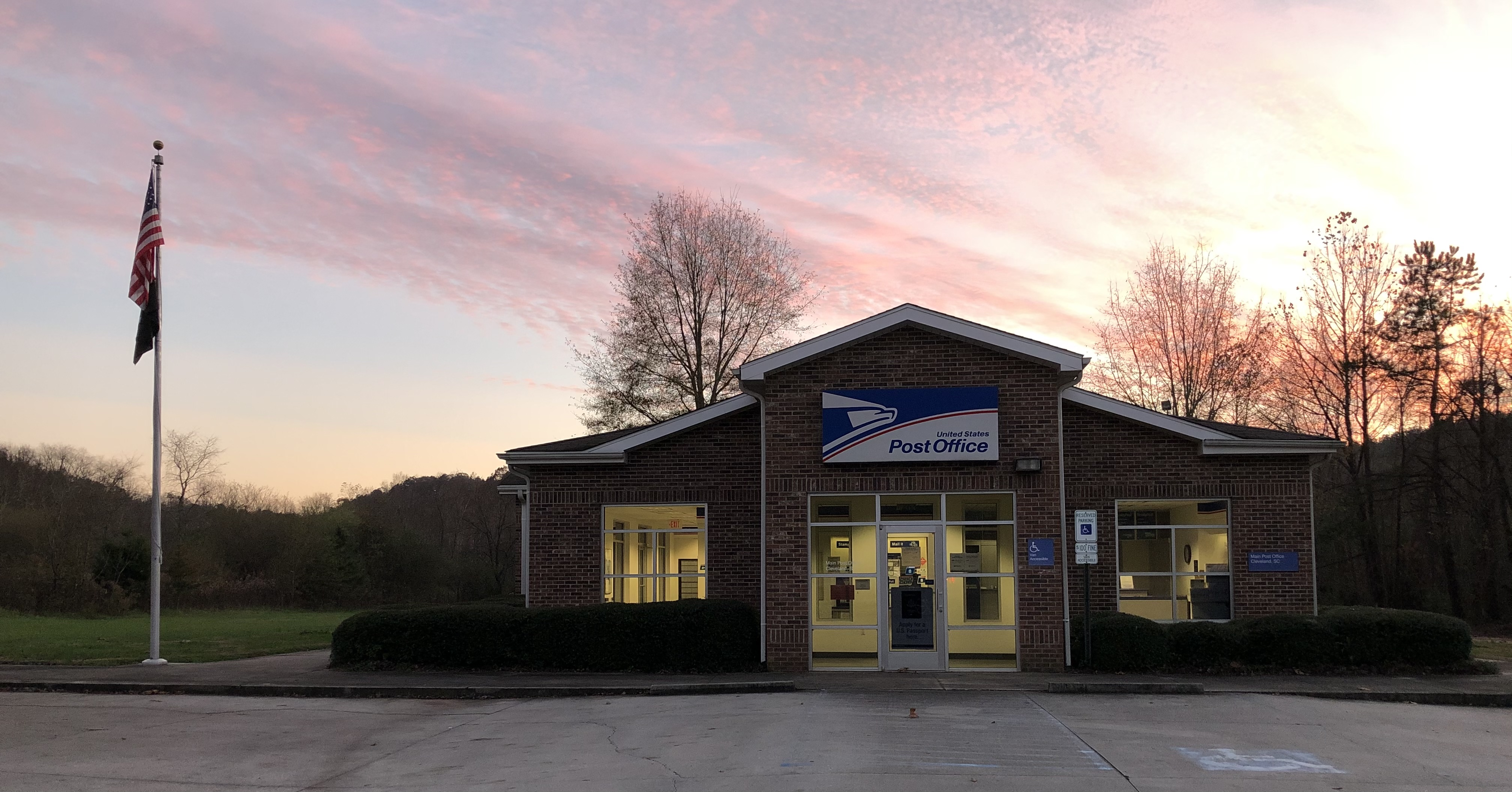
- Cleveland post office

- Location within South Carolina Location within the United States
- Coordinates: 35°04′20″N 82°31′38″W
- Country: United States
- State: South Carolina
- County: Greenville
- Elevation: 1,001 ft (305 m)

Population (2020)
  - Total: 1,347
  - Density: 19.5/sq mi (7.5/km^{2})
- Time zone: UTC-5 (Eastern (EST))
  - Summer (DST): UTC-4 (EDT)
- ZIP code: 29635
- Area codes: 864, 821
- GNIS feature ID: 1221633

Cleveland is an unincorporated community in Greenville County, South Carolina, United States. Cleveland is located on U.S. Route 276 and South Carolina Highway 11, 8.7 miles (14.0 km) north-northwest of Travelers Rest. The population was 1,347 at the 2020 census. Cleveland has a post office with ZIP code 29635, which opened on April 9, 1900 and Fred W. Symmes Chapel, which opened in 1941.

== Demographics ==
As of the 2020 census, 1,347 people, 586 households and 438 families resided in Cleveland. 18.5% of the family households included children, while 68% were married couples with no children. 148 households were non-family; 5.7% of these consisted of a single householder with children while 7.5% consisted of a single householder with no children.

The racial demographic of the community was 96.1% white and 1.5% black, while all other races accounted for less than 1%. Hispanics and Latinos of any race accounted for 0.5% of the population.

== See also ==
- List of census-designated places in South Carolina
