= Zeno Hicks House =

Historic house in South Carolina, United States

- U.S. National Register of Historic Places
- U.S. Historic district
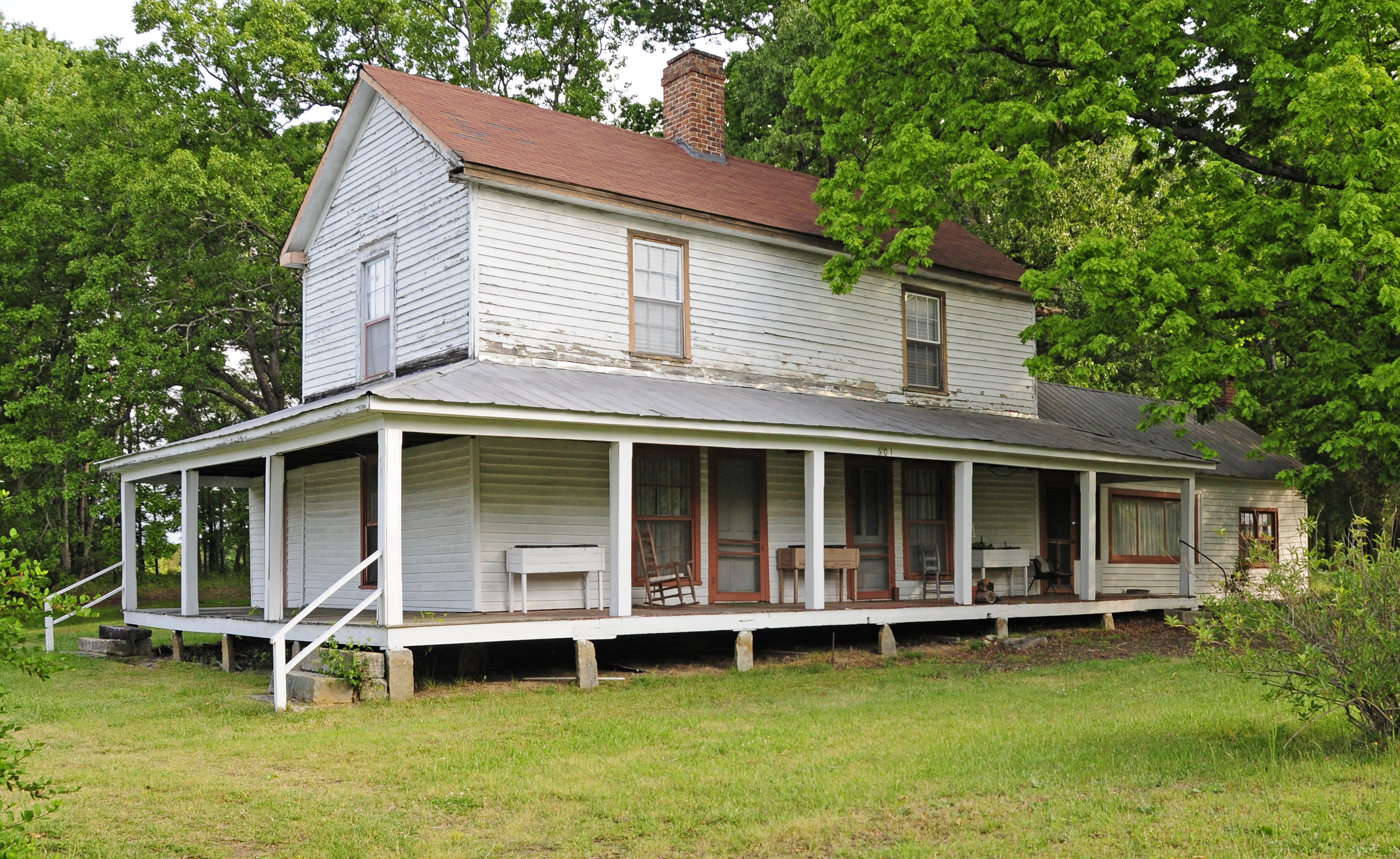
- The Zeno Hicks House in April 2012

- Location within South Carolina Location within the United States
- Location: U.S. Route 221 and Mill Gap Road near Chesnee, South Carolina
- Coordinates: 35°9′7″N 81°51′21″W
- Area: 4 acres (1.6 ha)
- Built: 1887
- Built by: Wadkins, Ramus; Lovelace, Jubilee
- Architectural style: Central-chimney I house
- NRHP reference No.: 89000002
- Added to NRHP: February 9, 1989

The Zeno Hicks House, also known as the McKinney-Hicks Homeplace, is a historic home and national historic district near Chesnee, South Carolina. The district encompasses one contributing building and one contributing structure. The house, built in 1886, is a two-story rectangular frame I-house built of weatherboard and hand sawn from heart pine. The house has a one-story rear addition and a one-story porch with shed roof, and extends around the façade. The property also includes a corn crib. It is associated with Zeno Hicks, a prominent local folk doctor and musician of Cherokee County. It was listed on the National Register of Historic Places in 1989.
