= Hillside (Carlisle, South Carolina) =

Historic house in South Carolina, United States

- U.S. National Register of Historic Places
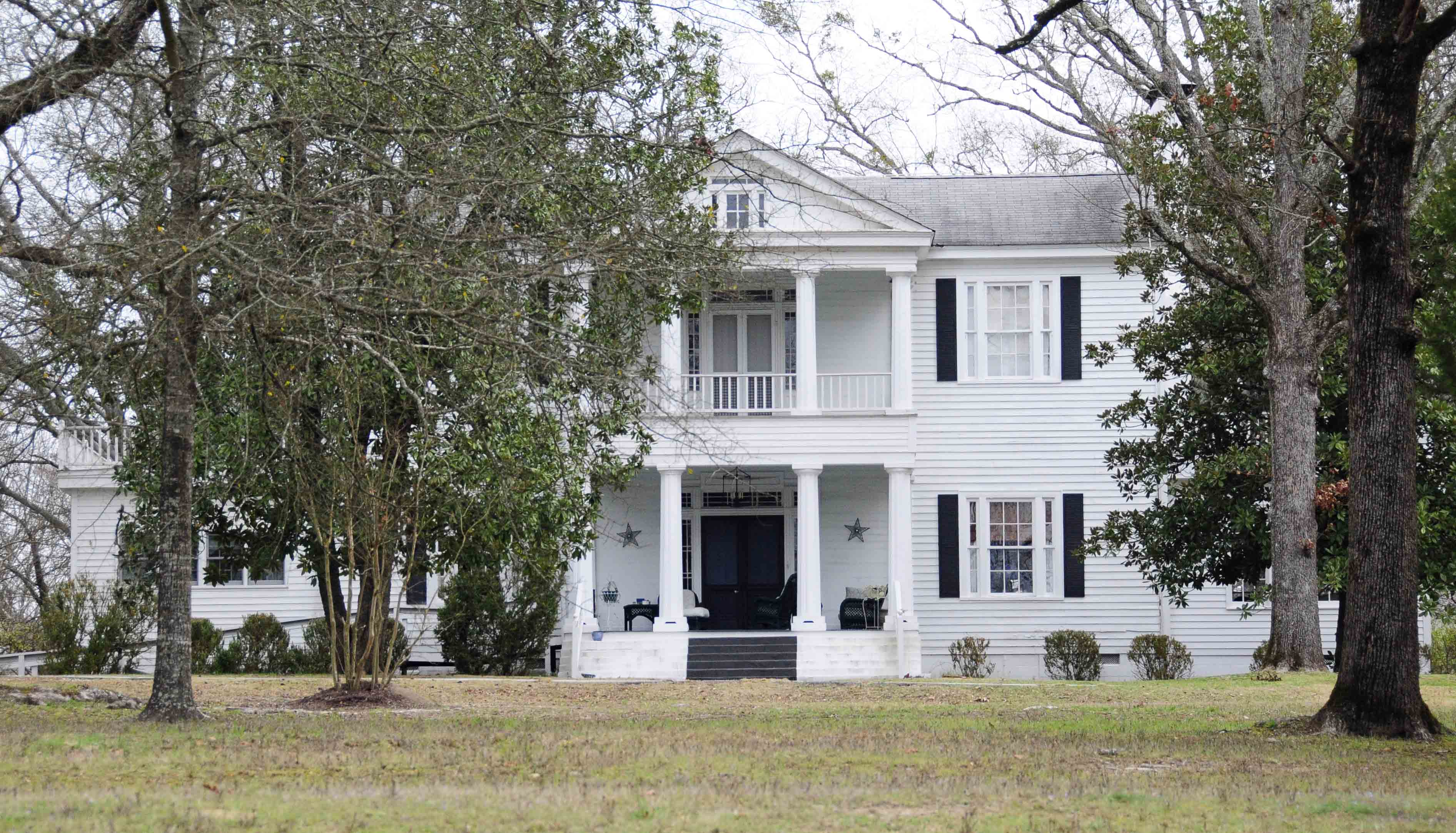
- Hillside, March 2012

- Location within South Carolina Location within the United States
- Location: Northwest of Carlisle on South Carolina Highway 215, near Carlisle, South Carolina
- Coordinates: 34°36′04″N 81°28′37″W
- Area: 26 acres (11 ha)
- Built: c. 1820-1830
- Built by: Sherman, J.E.
- Architectural style: Federal
- NRHP reference No.: 78002533
- Added to NRHP: February 17, 1978

Hillside is a historic home located near Carlisle, Union County, South Carolina. It was built between 1820 and 1830, and is a two-story, "L-shaped" Federal style clapboard structure. It features a central double piazza with slender Tuscan order wooden columns. It was enlarged about 1850. Also on the property are tall granite gate posts with folk art relief sculpture. The posts are believed to have been carved about 1861 by J. E. Sherman, a Union soldier who became ill and was left at Hillside to recuperate prior to the American Civil War. Also on the property are a hand-hewn barn, a well with modern well-house, and another small 19th-century structure.

It was added to the National Register of Historic Places in 1978.
