= South Carolina Highway 213 =

State highway in South Carolina, United States

South Carolina Highway 213

Route information
- Maintained by SCDOT
- Length: 21.380 mi (34.408 km)

Major junctions
- West end: US 176 near Peak
- SC 215 near Jenkinsville
- East end: US 321 / US 321 Bus. / SC 34 near Winnsboro Mills

Location
- Country: United States
- State: South Carolina
- Counties: Newberry, Fairfield

Highway system
- South Carolina State Highway System; Interstate; US; State; Scenic
← SC 212	→ SC 215

South Carolina Highway 213 (SC 213) is a 21.380-mile-long (34.408 km) state highway in the U.S. state of South Carolina. The highway travels through mostly rural areas of Newberry and Fairfield counties. It also connects Jenkinsville and the Winnsboro area.

== Route description ==
SC 213 begins at an intersection with U.S. Route 176 (US 176) southeast of Pomaria within Newberry County, where the roadway continues as Parr Road. It travels to the east and crosses over Crims Creek. A short distance later, the highway crosses over the Broad River, Hampton Island and some railroad tracks on an unnamed bridge. This bridge marks the Fairfield County line. SC 213 travels to the northeast and intersects SC 215 (Monticello Road) near Jenkinsville. The two highways travel concurrently along the southeastern edge of the Monticello Reservoir. They split, with SC 213 traveling to the east. A short distance later, it curves to the northeast and then crosses over Little River. Farther to the northeast is a crossing of Robinson Branch. It skirts along the southwestern edge of the city limits of Winnsboro. After a short rural section, it meets its eastern terminus, an intersection with US 321/SC 34 just southwest of Winnsboro Mills. This intersection also marks the southern terminus of US 321 Business (Columbia Road).

== Major intersections ==
County	Location	mi	km	Destinations	Notes
Newberry		0.000	0.000	US 176 – Pomaria, Columbia	Western terminus
Broad River and railroad tracks of Norfolk Southern Railway		2.559– 2.729	4.118– 4.392	Dr. Carroll A. Pinner Sr. Bridge	
Fairfield		5.520	8.884	SC 215 south (Monticello Road) – Columbia	Western end of SC 215 concurrency
Fairfield	Jenkinsville	8.220	13.229	SC 215 north (Old Cherokee Road) – Union	Eastern end of SC 215 concurrency
Fairfield		21.380	34.408	US 321 / SC 34 / US 321 Bus. north (Columbia Road) – Columbia, Chester	Southern terminus of US 321 Bus.
1.000 mi = 1.609 km; 1.000 km = 0.621 mi: Concurrency terminus
