= South Carolina Highway 329 =

State highway in South Carolina, United States

South Carolina Highway 329
- Victory Trail Road

Route information
- Maintained by SCDOT
- Length: 6.350 mi (10.219 km)
- Existed: 1982–present

Major junctions
- South end: SC 105 near Gaffney
- US 29 near Gaffney
- North end: SC 18 near Gaffney

Location
- Country: United States
- State: South Carolina
- Counties: Cherokee

Highway system
- South Carolina State Highway System; Interstate; US; State; Scenic
← SC 327	→ SC 332

South Carolina Highway 329 (SC 329) is a 6.350-mile (10.219 km) primary state highway in the U.S. state of South Carolina. It serves as an eastern bypass to the town of Gaffney.

== Route description ==
SC 329 is a two-lane bypass route between SC 105 and SC 18, located east of Gaffney. It is also known as the Victory Trail Road, as it overlaps with the Overmountain Victory National Historic Trail.

== History ==
SC 329 was established by 1982 as a new primary route between SC 105 and SC 18.

The first SC 329 was established in 1942 as a new primary routing between SC 22 in Glymphville and SC 177. In 1948, it was decommissioned and downgraded to secondary roads S-36-28 and S-40-32.

=== South Carolina Highway 180 ===
South Carolina Highway 180
- Location: Gaffney, South Carolina
- Length: 2.2 mi (3.5 km)
- Existed: 1942–1948

South Carolina Highway 180 (SC 180) was established as a new primary routing between U.S. Route 29 (US 29) and SC 18 northeast of Gaffney. In 1948, it was decommissioned and was downgraded to secondary road S-11-32. Around 1982, most of the former route became part of SC 329.

== Junction list ==
The entire route is in Cherokee County.

Location	mi	km	Destinations	Notes
	0.000	0.000	SC 105 – Gaffney, Wilkinsville	Southern terminus
	4.250	6.840	US 29 – Blacksburg, Gaffney	
	6.350	10.219	SC 18 to I-85 – Shelby, Charlotte, Spartanburg, Gaffney	Northern terminus
1.000 mi = 1.609 km; 1.000 km = 0.621 mi
