= Fred W. Symmes Chapel =

Open-air chapel in Cleveland, South Carolina

Coordinates: 35°08′02″N 82°34′31″W

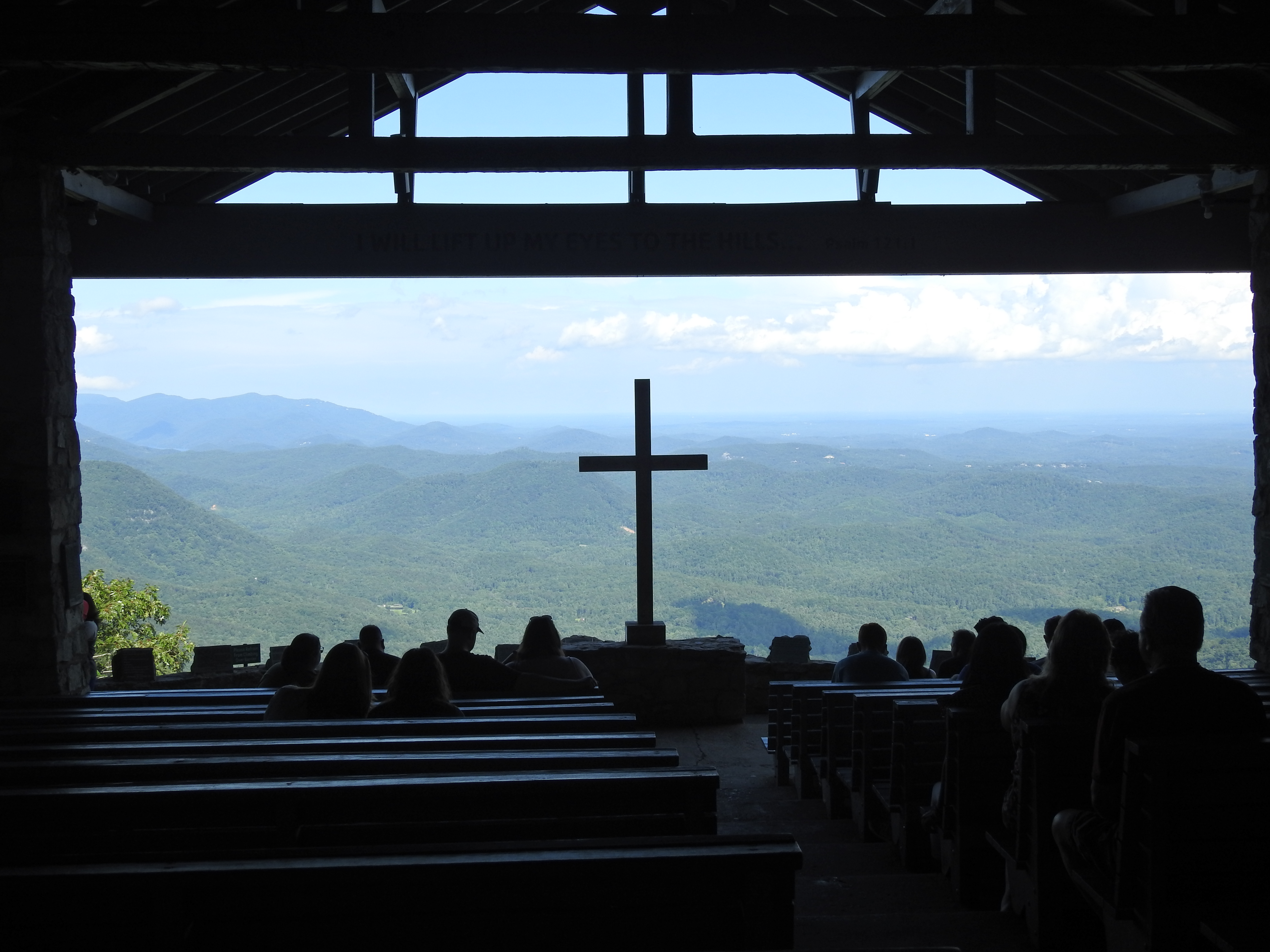
- Fred W. Symmes Chapel in July, 2023
- Fred W. Symmes Chapel
- Country: United States
- Website: https://www.campgreenville.org/pretty-place

History
- Founded: 1941
- Founder: Fred Symmes

Fred W. Symmes Chapel, also known locally as "Pretty Place", is an open-air chapel located in Cleveland, South Carolina. Built in 1941 by Fred Symmes, it is situated on Stone Mountain at an elevation of 3,200 feet overlooking the Blue Ridge Mountains. It is visited by an estimated 312,000 people annually.

The chapel was extensively damaged by Hurricane Helene in September 2024.

== History ==
In 1921, the land on which the chapel would be constructed was sold to YMCA Camp Greenville by the Cleveland family. Camp Greenville would then close due to the First World War, and would then reopen in 1925. The chapel would then after be constructed in 1941 with donations from the Fred Symmes Foundation.

In September 2024, the chapel received extensive damage from Hurricane Helene, with over half of the roof taken off by the storm, along with several support beams. The cross received no damage. The chapel reopened on January 3, 2025.
