= South Carolina Highway 496 =

State highway in South Carolina, United States

South Carolina Highway 496

- Route of SC 496 highlighted in red

Route information
- Maintained by SCDOT
- Length: 1.640 mi (2.639 km)
- Existed: 1980–present

Major junctions
- West end: SC 49 / SC 49 Truck in Union
- US 176 / SC 18 Truck / SC 49 Truck / SC 215 in Union
- East end: SC 18 in Union

Location
- Country: United States
- State: South Carolina
- Counties: Union

Highway system
- South Carolina State Highway System; Interstate; US; State; Scenic
← SC 462	→ US 501

South Carolina Highway 496 (SC 496) is a 1.640-mile (2.639 km) primary state highway in the U.S. state of South Carolina. It serves as an unsigned state-maintained truck route through and around Union.

== Route description ==
SC 496 is a short 1.6-mile (2.6 km) unsigned highway that connects the industrial park area and downtown area of Union. From SC 49 to U.S. Route 176 (US 176), SC 18 Truck, and SC 215, it is known as Industrial Park Road; from US 176/SC 18 Truck/SC 215 to SC 18, it is called Union Boulevard. On Industrial Park Road, it is a two-lane highway, concurrent with SC 49 Truck. On Union Boulevard it is a four-lane highway.

== History ==
SC 496 was established by 1980 as a new primary routing in Union from SC 49 to SC 18. It has not changed inception.

== Major intersections ==
The entire route is in Union, Union County.

mi	km	Destinations	Notes
0.000	0.000	SC 49 (Cross Keys Highway) / Industrial Park Road north – Laurens	Western end of SC 49 Truck concurrency; western terminus of SC 496; southern terminus of SC 49 Truck; Industrial Park Road continues past terminus.
0.760	1.223	US 176 / SC 18 Truck / SC 215 (Duncan Bypass) – Newberry, Chester, Spartanburg	Eastern end of SC 49 Truck concurrency
1.64	2.64	SC 18 (Pinckney Street) / Church Street east – Newberry, Chester	Eastern terminus; roadway continues as Church Street.
1.000 mi = 1.609 km; 1.000 km = 0.621 mi: Concurrency terminus
