= Watts Mills, South Carolina =

Wattsville, South Carolina
- Census-designated place
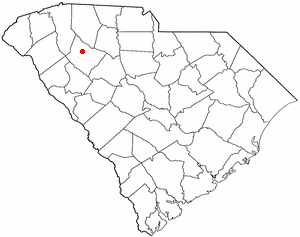
- Location in South Carolina
- Coordinates: 34°30′58″N 81°59′42″W
- Country: United States
- State: South Carolina
- County: Laurens

Area
  - Total: 2.29 sq mi (5.92 km^{2})
  - Land: 2.29 sq mi (5.92 km^{2})
  - Water: 0 sq mi (0.00 km^{2})
- Elevation: 650 ft (200 m)

Population (2020)
  - Total: 1,654
  - Density: 723.0/sq mi (279.17/km^{2})
- Time zone: UTC-5 (Eastern (EST))
  - Summer (DST): UTC-4 (EDT)
- ZIP code: 29360
- Area codes: 864, 821
- FIPS code: 45-75220
- GNIS feature ID: 2402988

Wattsville is an unincorporated community in Laurens County, South Carolina, United States. The town name is derived from Watts Mill, a textile mill in the center of town. The area is listed as the Wattsville census-designated place (CDP) for statistical purposes. The population of the CDP was 1,635 at the 2010 census. It is part of the Greenville–Mauldin–Easley Metropolitan Statistical Area.

== Geography ==
Wattsville is located in central Laurens County and is bordered to the southwest by the city of Laurens, the county seat. U.S. Route 221 passes through the center of Wattsville, leading north 34 miles (55 km) to Spartanburg and south through Laurens 27 miles (43 km) to Greenwood. South Carolina Highway 49 leaves US 221 in Wattsville, leading northeast 29 miles (47 km) to Union. Interstate 385 passes 2 miles (3 km) north of Wattsville, with access from both US-221 and SC-49.

According to the United States Census Bureau, the CDP has a total area of 2.3 square miles (5.9 km^{2}), all land. The center of the community occupies a ridge between south-flowing streams that lead to the Little River, a southeast-flowing tributary of the Saluda River.

== Demographics ==
Historical population
Census	Pop.	Note	%±
2000	1,479		—
2010	1,635		10.5%
2020	1,654		1.2%
U.S. Decennial Census

As of the census of 2010, there were 1,635 people, 564 households, and 356 families residing in the CDP. The population density was 646.8 inhabitants per square mile (249.7/km^{2}). There were 629 housing units at an average density of 275.1 per square mile (106.2/km^{2}). The racial makeup of the CDP was 68.29% White, 16.23% African American, 2.77% Native American, 0.20% Pacific Islander, 9.33% from other races, and 3.18% from two or more races. Hispanic or Latino of any race were 16.36% of the population.

There were 566 households, out of which 32.7% had children under the age of 18 living with them, 41.2% were married couples living together, 14.7% had a female householder with no husband present, and 37.1% were non-families. 30.2% of all households were made up of individuals, and 12.5% had someone living alone who was 65 years of age or older. The average household size was 2.61 and the average family size was 3.21.

In the CDP, the population was spread out, with 26.4% under the age of 18, 12.5% from 18 to 24, 29.6% from 25 to 44, 20.8% from 45 to 64, and 10.8% who were 65 years of age or older. The median age was 31 years. For every 100 females, there were 110.7 males. For every 100 females age 18 and over, there were 102.4 males.

The median income for a household in the CDP was $25,046, and the median income for a family was $26,328. Males had a median income of $26,473 versus $15,833 for females. The per capita income for the CDP was $12,555. About 22.5% of families and 25.3% of the population were below the poverty line, including 39.5% of those under age 18 and 15.1% of those age 65 or over.

== Education ==
It is in the Laurens School District 55. The comprehensive high school is Laurens District 55 High School.
