= South Carolina Highway 215 =

State highway in South Carolina, United States

South Carolina Highway 215

- Route of SC 215 highlighted in red

Route information
- Maintained by SCDOT
- Length: 96.330 mi (155.028 km)
- Existed: 1928–present

Major junctions
- South end: US 21 / US 321 in Columbia
- I-20 in Columbia; US 176 / SC 18 in Union; US 221 in Roebuck
- North end: SC 295 / SC 296 in Spartanburg

Location
- Country: United States
- State: South Carolina
- Counties: Richland, Fairfield, Chester, Union, Spartanburg

Highway system
- South Carolina State Highway System; Interstate; US; State; Scenic
← SC 213	→ SC 216

South Carolina Highway 215 (SC 215) is a 96.330-mile (155.028 km) primary state highway in the U.S. state of South Carolina. It serves as an alternate route to Union from either Columbia or Spartanburg.

== Route description ==
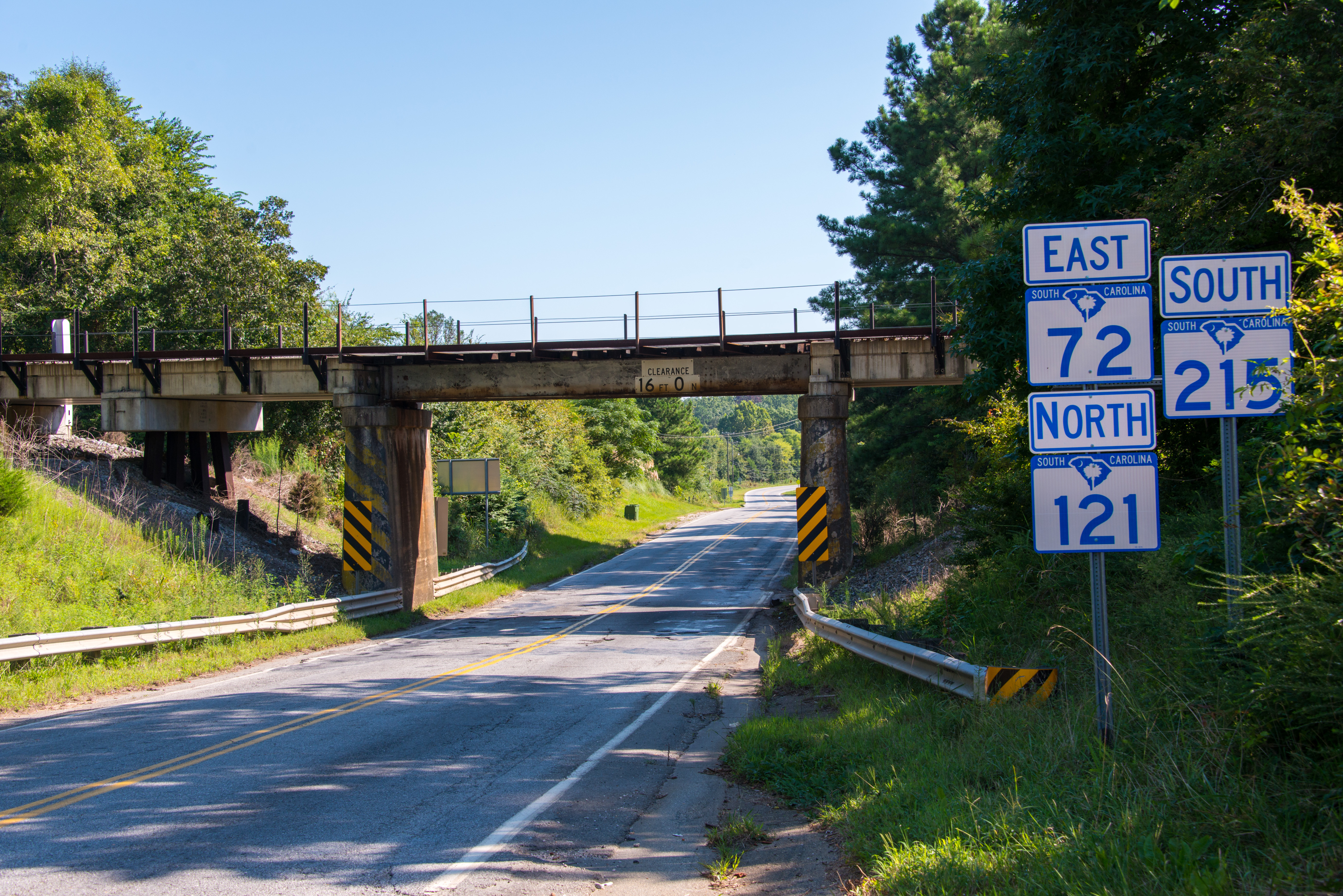
SC 72/SC 121/SC 215 in Carlisle

SC 215 is a two-lane rural highway that traverses for 95.7 miles (154.0 km) from Columbia to Spartanburg; connecting Jenkinsville, Carlisle, Union, and Roebuck.

== History ==
It was established in 1928 as a renumbering of SC 121 and SC 161. It originally traveled from U.S. Route 78 (US 78) in Aiken, northeast through Wagener, Pelion, Edmund, and West Columbia. Through Columbia, in a concurrency with US 1/US 21/SC 2, it heads northwest through Jenkinsville, Carlisle, ending at US 176/SC 92 in Union.

In 1939, the entire route was paved. In 1948, SC 215 was rerouted to approach Union from the south, its old route through Monarch Mill being replaced by SC 92 (today SC 49-SC 215 Connector). In 1949, SC 215 was extended north to SC 56, in Pauline; a year later, it was extended north again to US 221 in Roebuck.

By 1958, SC 215 was rerouted in Columbia along Assembly Street to Blossom Street before heading west across the Saluda River in concurrency with US 21/US 176/US 321. By 1964, SC 215 was extended north from Roebuck to its current northern terminus at SC 295/SC 296 in Spartanburg; it replaced SC 295, and brought SC 215 to its longest routing.

Between 1974 and 1977, SC 215 south of Eau Claire, in Columbia, was removed. The old alignment between Aiken to Cayce became SC 302, while in Columbia US 21/US 321 remained.

== Major intersections ==
County	Location	mi	km	Destinations	Notes
Richland	Columbia	0.000	0.000	US 21 / US 321 – Columbia, Rock Hill	Southern terminus
Richland	Columbia	1.800	2.897	I-20 – Florence, Augusta	I-20 exit 68
Richland	Cedar Creek	12.360	19.891	SC 269 north – Winnsboro	Southern terminus of SC 269
Fairfield	Jenkinsville	23.770	38.254	SC 213 west – Peak, Pomaria	Southern end of SC 213 concurrency
Fairfield		26.470	42.599	SC 213 east – Winnsboro	Northern end of SC 213 concurrency
Fairfield		34.760	55.941	SC 34 – Blair, Winnsboro	
Chester		49.210	79.196	SC 72 east / SC 121 north (West End Road) – Chester	Southern end of SC 72/SC 121 concurrency
Union	Carlisle	53.140	85.521	SC 72 west / SC 121 south (Janie Glymph Goree Boulevard) – Whitmire	Northern end of SC 72/SC 121 concurrency
Union		62.170	100.053	Monarch Highway (SC 49 Conn. north)	Southern terminus of SC 49 Conn.
Union		65.270	105.042	South Pinckney Street north (SC 215 Conn. north) – Union	No access from SC 215 Conn. south to SC 215; southern terminus of SC 215 Conn.
Union	Union	65.320	105.122	US 176 east / SC 18 north (Whitmire Highway) – Union, Newberry, Columbia	Southern end of US 176 concurrency; southern terminus of SC 18
Union	Union	66.650	107.263	SC 49 Truck south (Industrial Park Road west / Union Boulevard east / SC 496)	Southern end of SC 49 Truck concurrency
Union	Union	66.930	107.713	SC 49 south (Main Street) – Laurens, Union	Southern end of SC 49 concurrency; provides access to Union Medical Center
Union	Union	67.680	108.920	SC 49 north (Rice Avenue) – USC-Union, Union City High School, Tinker Sports Complex	Northern end of SC 49 concurrency
Union	Union	68.460	110.176	US 176 west (Duncan Bypass) – Gaffney, Spartanburg	Northern end of US 176 concurrency
Spartanburg	Glenn Springs	83.560	134.477	SC 150 (Glenn Springs Road) – Pacolet, Cross Anchor	
Spartanburg	Pauline	85.700	137.921	SC 56 west – Cross Anchor, Clinton	Southern end of SC 56 concurrency
Spartanburg		86.770	139.643	SC 56 east – Spartanburg	Northern end of SC 56 concurrency
Spartanburg	Roebuck	92.340	148.607	US 221 (Church Street) – Spartanburg, Woodruff	
Spartanburg	Spartanburg	96.330	155.028	SC 295 / SC 296 (John B White Sr. Boulevard) – Arcadia	Northern terminus
1.000 mi = 1.609 km; 1.000 km = 0.621 mi: Concurrency terminus

== Union connector route ==
South Carolina Highway 215 Connector
- Location: Union, South Carolina
- Length: 0.120 mi (193 m)

South Carolina Highway 215 Connector (SC 215 Conn.) is a brief 0.120-mile (0.193 km) stub of Pinckney Street, between the SC 215 mainline and SC 18. It serves as a turn-off onto SC 18, from SC 215, without taking the right turn at the intersection immediately afterwards; as a hidden designation, signage only identifies it as SC 18 north (no south).

The entire route is in Union County.

Location	mi	km	Destinations	Notes
	0.000	0.000	Beltline Road (SC 215)	No access from SC 18 Conn. south to SC 215; southern terminus
Union	0.120	0.193	South Pinckney Street (SC 18)	Northern terminus
1.000 mi = 1.609 km; 1.000 km = 0.621 mi
