= Blue Ridge Christian Academy =

Location
- 424 Highway 101; Landrum, South Carolina 29653; United States
- 35°6′N 82°20′W

Information
- School type: Private
- Motto: "Equipping students to impact the world for Christ"
- Denomination: Non-denominational
- Established: 2004
- Closed: 2013 (Lack of funding)
- Administrator: Diana Baker
- Grades: Preschool-12 (as of 2012)
- Campus size: 30 acres (120,000 m^{2})
- Campus type: Rural
- Colors: Blue, Green, Yellow
- Athletics: Ladies' Volleyball, Cross Country, Boys' Fall Soccer, Boys' and Girls' Basketball, Boys' and Girls' Spring Soccer
- Athletics conference: Blue Ridge Christian Conference
- Mascot: Warrior
- Yearbook: The Chronicle
- Website: http://www.brca.us/

Blue Ridge Christian Academy was a private college preparatory Christian school in Landrum, South Carolina. In 2013, the academy was featured in nationwide coverage for administering a creationist science quiz. The academy closed for the 2013-2014 school year due to lack of funding.

The academy was founded by Jill and E.J. Bird in 2004, and governed by a board of directors. It was accredited by Association of Christian Schools International and had classes for students ranging from Pre-kindergarten to High School level.

== Controversies ==
The school offered a Christ-centered education, where kids were intended to be "prepared to impact the world for Christ." In Spring 2013, it was reported that a 4th grade science quiz administered at the school promoted Young Earth creationism. The correct answers to the quiz stated that the Earth is not billions of years old, that dinosaurs did not live millions of years ago, that God created dinosaurs on the 6th day and included several additional questions regarding Bible content. Diana Baker, BRCA Administrator, stated that she did not feel anything wrong was done and that the teacher would not be disciplined.

Ken Ham, President of Answers in Genesis, stated on his blog that the quiz was based on a DVD produced by his organization.

== Closure ==
Blue Ridge Christian Academy announced that it would not be open for the 2013-2014 school year due to lack of funding. The school had sought $200,000 to remain open, but had only received $15,000 in donations. On August 8, 2013, a public sale was scheduled by the school to sell its curricula, books, teacher resources, office supplies, school supplies, toys and bulletin board materials. The school's furniture and computers were not included in the sale. The proceeds of the sale were to go towards paying its debts, which included two months of teachers' salaries.

== Gallery ==
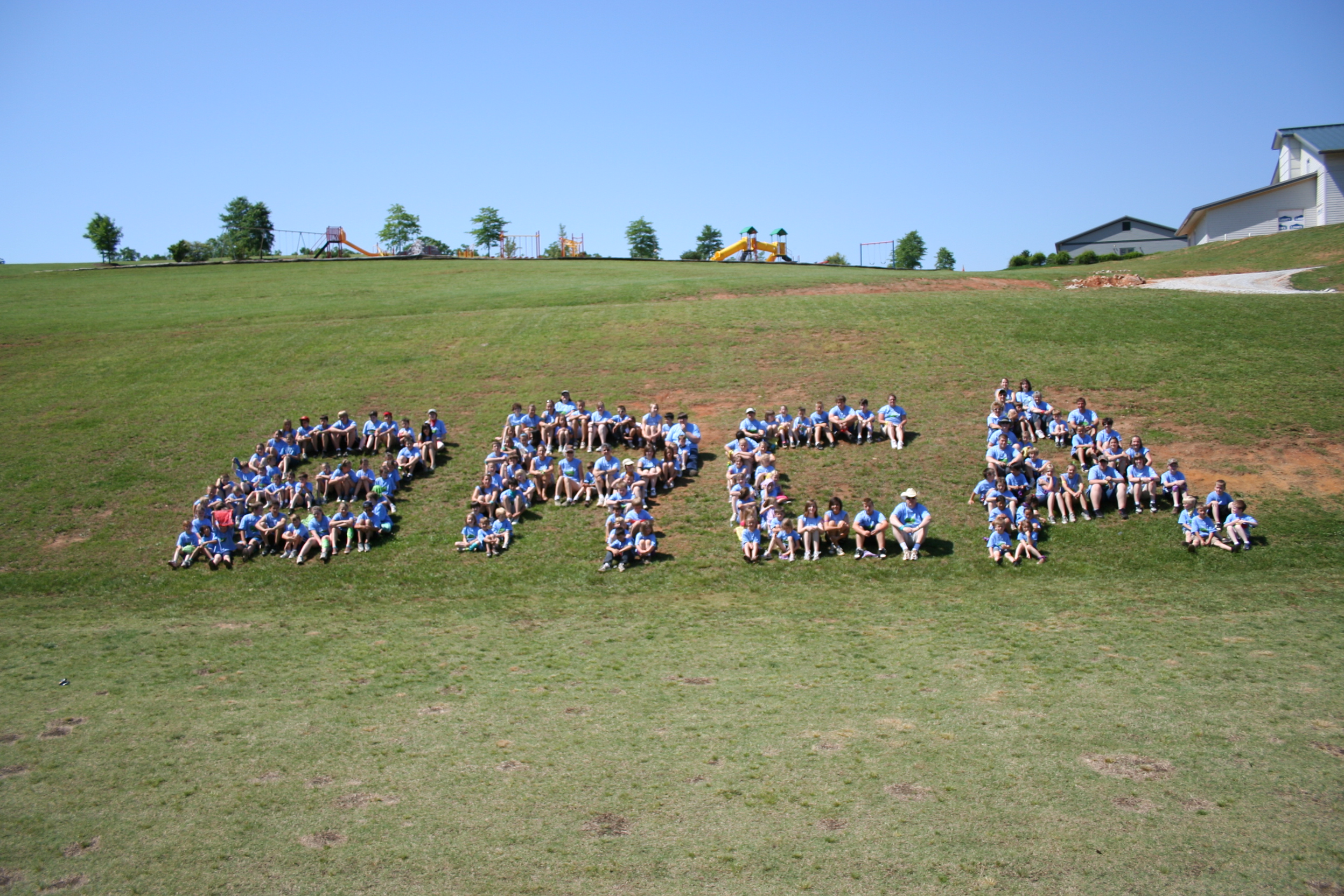
Parents and kids huddle together after Field Day to form the letters: BRCA
