= Buffalo, South Carolina =

- CDP
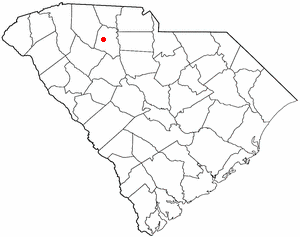
- Location of Buffalo, South Carolina
- Coordinates: 34°43′28″N 81°41′04″W
- Country: United States
- State: South Carolina
- County: Union

Area
  - Total: 4.02 sq mi (10.42 km^{2})
  - Land: 4.02 sq mi (10.42 km^{2})
  - Water: 0 sq mi (0.00 km^{2})
- Elevation: 558 ft (170 m)

Population (2020)
  - Total: 1,288
  - Density: 320.3/sq mi (123.66/km^{2})
- Time zone: UTC-5 (Eastern (EST))
  - Summer (DST): UTC-4 (EDT)
- ZIP code: 29321
- Area codes: 864, 821
- FIPS code: 45-10090
- GNIS feature ID: 2402730

Buffalo is a census-designated place (CDP) in Union County, South Carolina, United States. The population was 1,266 at the 2010 United States census.

== History ==
The community was named for a nearby mineral lick which attracted buffalo.

The Buffalo Mill Historic District was added to the National Register of Historic Places in 1990.

== Geography ==
According to the United States Census Bureau, the CDP has a total area of 4.0 square miles (10 km^{2}), all of it land.

== Demographics ==
Historical population
Census	Pop.	Note	%±
2020	1,288		—
U.S. Decennial Census

As of the census of 2000, there were 1,426 people, 587 households, and 402 families residing in the CDP. The population density was 355.2 inhabitants per square mile (137.1/km^{2}). There were 659 housing units at an average density of 164.2 per square mile (63.4/km^{2}). The racial makeup of the CDP was 83.03% White, 15.36% African American, 0.07% Native American, 0.35% Asian, 0.28% Pacific Islander, 0.42% from other races, and 0.49% from two or more races. Hispanic or Latino of any race were 1.26% of the population.

There were 587 households, out of which 28.1% had children under the age of 18 living with them, 47.4% were married couples living together, 14.7% had a female householder with no husband present, and 31.5% were non-families. 27.6% of all households were made up of individuals, and 11.2% had someone living alone who was 65 years of age or older. The average household size was 2.43 and the average family size was 2.94.

In the CDP, the population was spread out, with 23.6% under the age of 18, 8.3% from 18 to 24, 26.6% from 25 to 44, 25.7% from 45 to 64, and 15.8% who were 65 years of age or older. The median age was 39 years. For every 100 females, there were 83.5 males. For every 100 females age 18 and over, there were 85.8 males.

The median income for a household in the CDP was $36,285, and the median income for a family was $38,438. Males had a median income of $27,159 versus $19,286 for females. The per capita income for the CDP was $13,545. About 7.4% of families and 10.4% of the population were below the poverty line, including 13.9% of those under age 18 and none of those age 65 or over.
