= Woodland Plantation (Carlisle, South Carolina) =

Historic house in South Carolina, United States

- U.S. National Register of Historic Places
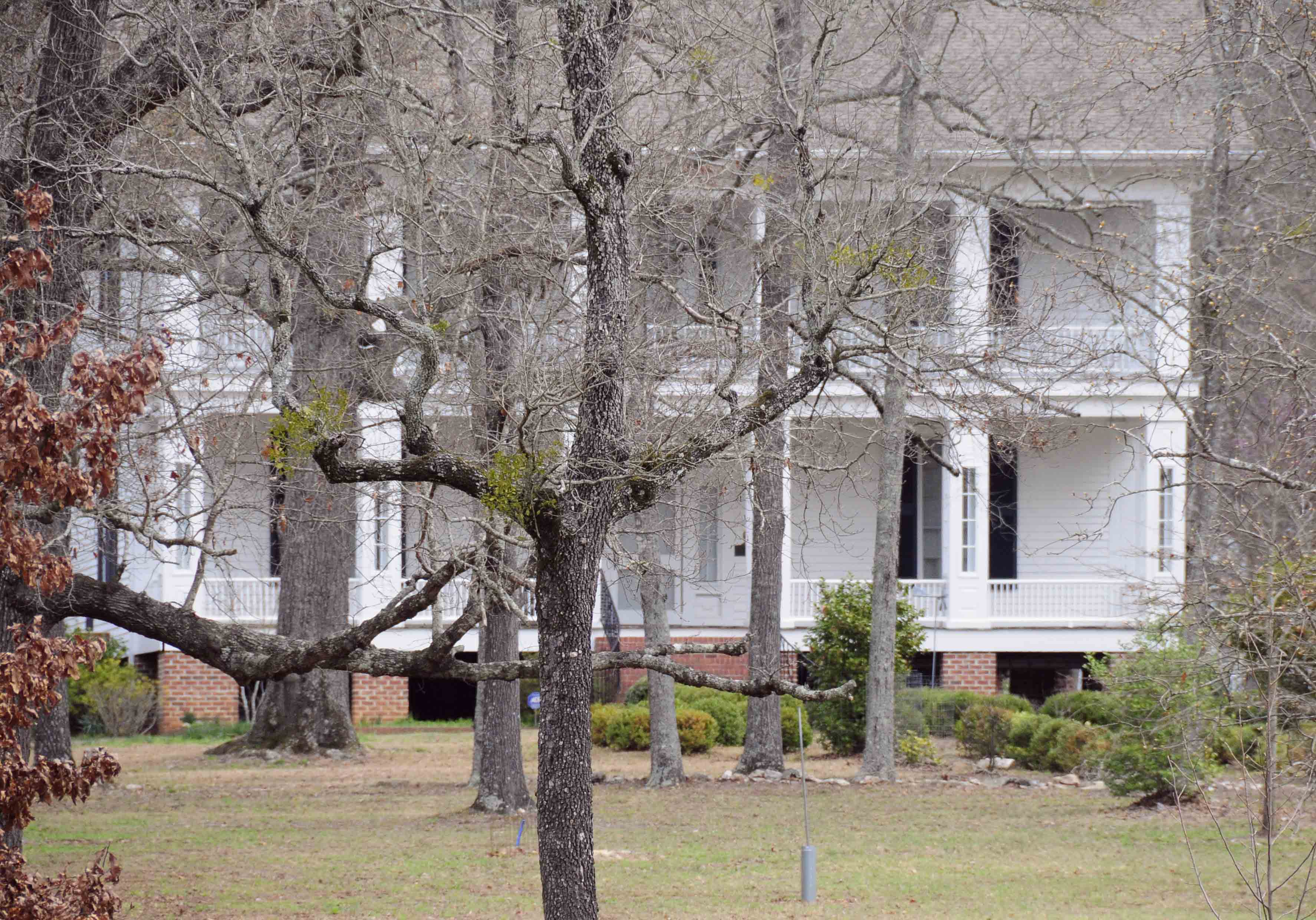
- Woodland Plantation, March 2012

- Location within South Carolina Location within the United States
- Location: 3435 Santuc-Carlisle Highway-South Carolina Highway 215, near Carlisle, South Carolina
- Coordinates: 34°37′23.5″N 81°29′42.8″W
- Area: 78 acres (32 ha)
- Built: c. 1850
- Architectural style: Greek Revival
- NRHP reference No.: 01000607
- Added to NRHP: May 30, 2001

Woodland Plantation is a historic plantation house and farm complex located near Carlisle, Union County, South Carolina, United States. It was built about 1850, and is a two-story, Greek Revival style clapboard structure. It features a front porch with square columns that have windows on all four sides. The complex includes buildings dating from 1850 to about 1950. They include a storehouse, a smokehouse, a carriage house, a bull pen, a cotton gin house, a privy, a hay barn, a calf barn, an office, a dairy milking parlor, and a silo.

It was added to the National Register of Historic Places in 2001.
