= Union County Airport (South Carolina) =

Union County Airport Troy Shelton Field
- IATA: USC; ICAO: none; FAA LID: 35A

Summary
- Airport type: Public
- Owner: Union County
- Serves: Union, South Carolina
- Elevation AMSL: 610 ft / 186 m
- Coordinates: 34°41′13″N 081°38′28″W

Map
- Location of airport in South Carolina

Runways
Direction	Length		Surface
Direction	ft	m	Surface
5/23	3,508	1,069	Asphalt

Statistics (2010)
- Aircraft operations: 6,500
- Based aircraft: 18
- Source: Federal Aviation Administration

Union County Airport (IATA: USC, FAA LID: 35A), also known as Troy Shelton Field, is a county-owned, public-use airport located one nautical mile (2 km) southwest of the central business district of Union, a city in Union County, South Carolina, United States. It is included in the National Plan of Integrated Airport Systems for 2011–2015, which categorized it as a general aviation facility.

== Facilities and aircraft ==
The airport covers an area of 64 acres (26 ha) at an elevation of 610 feet (186 m) above mean sea level. It has one runway designated 5/23 with an asphalt surface measuring 3,508 by 60 feet (1,069 x 18 m).

For the 12-month period ending October 8, 2010, the airport had 6,500 general aviation aircraft operations, an average of 17 per day. At that time there were 18 aircraft based at this airport: 94% single-engine and 6% multi-engine.

== See also ==
- List of airports in South Carolina
