= Draytonville, South Carolina =

- Unincorporated community
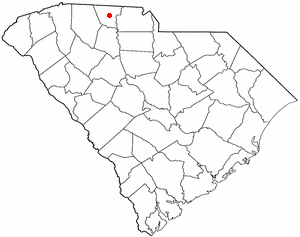
- Location of Draytonville, South Carolina
- Coordinates: 35°02′58″N 81°35′37″W
- Country: United States
- State: South Carolina
- County: Cherokee
- Elevation: 830 ft (250 m)
- Time zone: UTC-5 (Eastern (EST))
  - Summer (DST): UTC-4 (EDT)
- Area codes: 864, 821
- GNIS feature ID: 1222092

Draytonville is an unincorporated community in Cherokee County, South Carolina, United States. It lies near the city of Gaffney.
