= New Prospect, South Carolina =

Unincorporated community in South Carolina, US

Coordinates: 35°07′56″N 82°02′38″W

New Prospect is an unincorporated community in Spartanburg County, in the U.S. state of South Carolina.

== History ==
A post office called New Prospect was established in 1837, and remained in operation until 1902. The community took its name from the local New Prospect Baptist Church.
