= South Carolina Highway 114 =

State highway in South Carolina, United States

South Carolina Highway 114

Route information
- Maintained by SCDOT
- Length: 6.360 mi (10.235 km)

Major junctions
- West end: SC 18 north of Bonham
- SC 9 near Jonesville
- East end: SC 18 northeast of Jonesville

Location
- Country: United States
- State: South Carolina
- Counties: Union

Highway system
- South Carolina State Highway System; Interstate; US; State; Scenic
← SC 113	→ SC 116

South Carolina Highway 114 (SC 114) is a 6.360-mile-long (10.235 km) state highway in the U.S. state of South Carolina. The highway travels through rural areas of Union County. The highway has both termini at SC 18 and passes to the east of Jonesville. It is officially designated as a west–east highway, but is physically north–south.

== Route description ==
SC 114 begins at an intersection with SC 18 (Jonesville Highway) north of Bonham, within Union County. It travels to the north-northeast to an intersection with SC 9 (Jonesville–Lockhart Highway). The highway curves to the northwest, crosses over Sandy Run Creek, and meets its northern terminus, another intersection with SC 18.

== Major intersections ==
The entire route is in Union County.

Location	mi	km	Destinations	Notes
	0.000	0.000	SC 18 (Jonesville Highway) – Union, Jonesville	Western terminus
	1.990	3.203	SC 9 (Jonesville–Lockhart Highway) – Jonesville, Lockhart	
	6.360	10.235	SC 18 – Jonesville, Gaffney	Eastern terminus
1.000 mi = 1.609 km; 1.000 km = 0.621 mi
