= Cowpens National Battlefield =

Unit of the National Park Service in South Carolina, United States

- IUCN category III (natural monument or feature)
- Location within South Carolina Location within the United States
- Location: Cherokee County, South Carolina, United States
- Nearest city: Gaffney, South Carolina
- Coordinates: 35°08′12″N 81°49′05″W
- Area: 842 acres (341 ha)
- Established: March 4, 1929
- Visitors: 212,534 (in 2022)
- Governing body: National Park Service
- Website: Cowpens National Battlefield
- Cowpens National Battlefield
- U.S. National Register of Historic Places
- U.S. Historic district
- Nearest city: Chesnee, South Carolina
- Area: 178 acres (72 ha)
- Built: 1781
- NRHP reference No.: 66000072
- Added to NRHP: October 15, 1966

Cowpens National Battlefield is a unit of the National Park Service just east of Chesnee, South Carolina, and near the state line with North Carolina. It preserves a major battlefield of the American Revolutionary War.

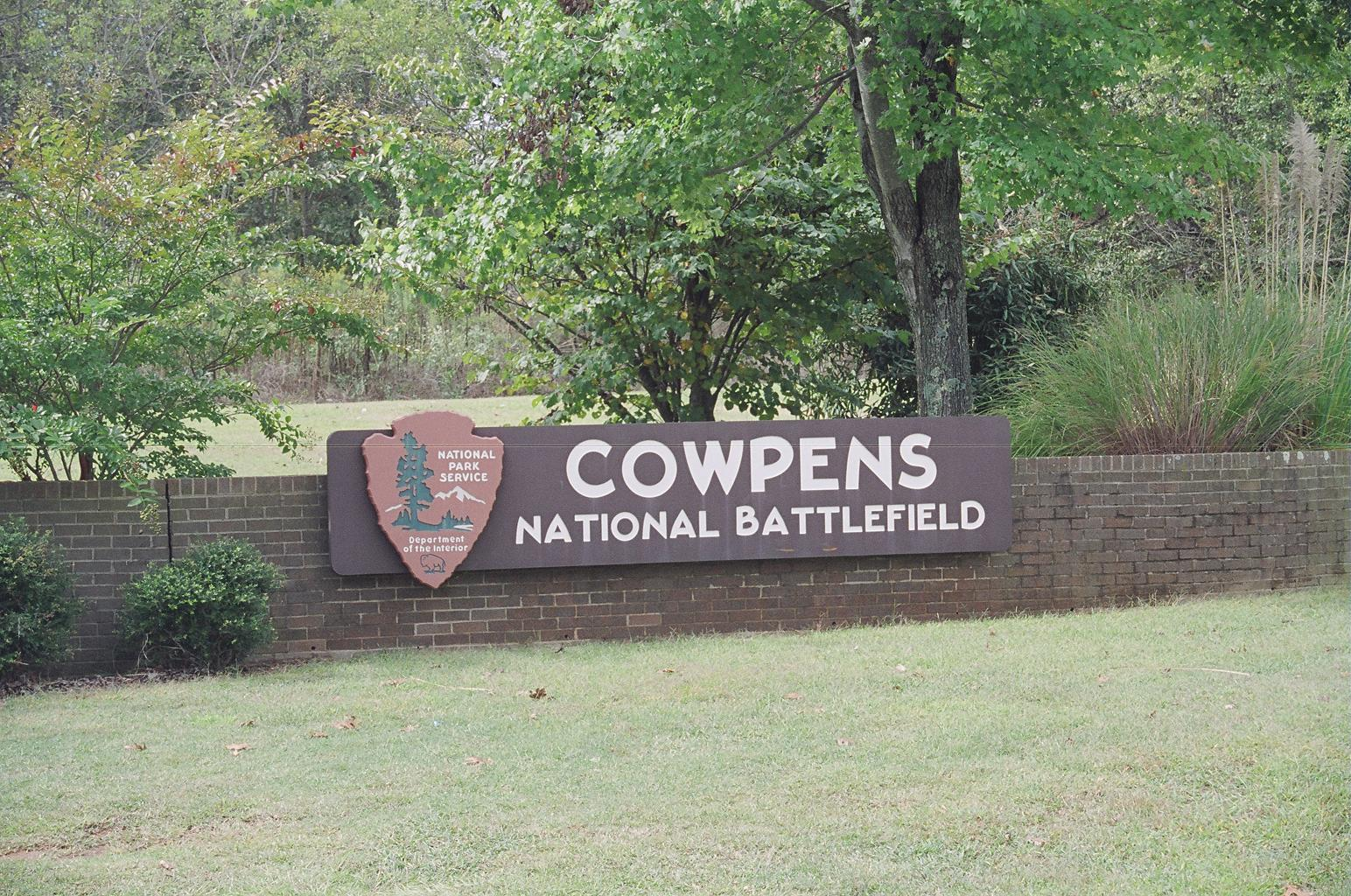
Main Entrance to Cowpens National Battlefield

Brigadier General Daniel Morgan won the Battle of Cowpens, a decisive Revolutionary War victory over British Lieutenant Colonel Banastre Tarleton on January 17, 1781. It is considered one of Morgan's most memorable victories and one of Tarleton's most memorable defeats.

Established as Cowpens National Battlefield Site March 4, 1929; transferred from the War Department August 10, 1933; redesignated April 11, 1972. Listed on the National Register of Historic Places on October 15, 1966. Area: 841.56 acres (3.41 km^{2}), Federal: 790.9 acres (3.2 km^{2}), Nonfederal: 50.66 acres (205,010 m^{2}).

The visitor center features a museum with exhibits about the American Revolution and the battle, including a fiber-optic map that illustrates the Southern Campaign of the American Revolution and the battle, a walking tour of the battlefield itself, and the reconstructed log cabin of one Robert Scruggs, who had farmed the land before the establishment of the park.
