= Monarch Mill, South Carolina =

- CDP
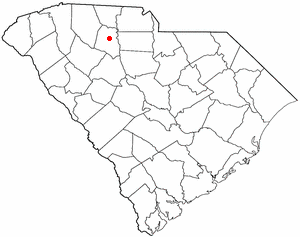
- Location of Monarch Mill, South Carolina
- Coordinates: 34°42′58″N 81°35′05″W
- Country: United States
- State: South Carolina
- County: Union

Area
  - Total: 5.61 sq mi (14.54 km^{2})
  - Land: 5.61 sq mi (14.54 km^{2})
  - Water: 0 sq mi (0.00 km^{2})
- Elevation: 479 ft (146 m)

Population (2020)
  - Total: 1,584
  - Density: 282.3/sq mi (108.98/km^{2})
- Time zone: UTC-5 (Eastern (EST))
  - Summer (DST): UTC-4 (EDT)
- ZIP code: 29379
- Area codes: 864, 821
- FIPS code: 45-47200
- GNIS feature ID: 2403300

Monarch Mill is a census-designated place (CDP) in Union County, South Carolina, United States. The population was 1,811 at the 2010 census.

== Geography ==
According to the United States Census Bureau, the CDP has a total area of 5.6 square miles (15 km^{2}), all land.

== Demographics ==
Historical population
| Census | Pop. | Note | %± |
|---|---|---|---|
| 2020 | 1,584 | | — |
U.S. Decennial Census

As of the census of 2000, there were 1,930 people, 796 households, and 580 families residing in the CDP. The population density was 343.1 inhabitants per square mile (132.5/km^{2}). There were 862 housing units at an average density of 153.3 per square mile (59.2/km^{2}). The racial makeup of the CDP was 84.61% White, 14.77% African American, 0.16% Native American, 0.00% Asian, 0.00% Pacific Islander, 0.00% from other races, and 0.47% from two or more races. 1.19% of the population were Hispanic or Latino of any race.

There were 796 households, out of which 28.1% had children under the age of 18 living with them, 51.5% were married couples living together, 16.0% had a female householder with no husband present, and 27.1% were non-families. 24.7% of all households were made up of individuals, and 10.1% had someone living alone who was 65 years of age or older. The average household size was 2.42 and the average family size was 2.84.

In the CDP, the population was spread out, with 22.7% under the age of 18, 8.1% from 18 to 24, 28.3% from 25 to 44, 25.0% from 45 to 64, and 16.0% who were 65 years of age or older. The median age was 39 years. For every 100 females, there were 90.9 males. For every 100 females age 18 and over, there were 93.8 males.

The median income for a household in the CDP was $30,625, and the median income for a family was $35,417. Males had a median income of $25,217 versus $18,958 for females. The per capita income for the CDP was $15,953. About 7.6% of families and 9.5% of the population were below the poverty line, including 12.7% of those under the age of 18 and 9.3% of those 65 and older.
