= Carlisle, South Carolina =

- Town
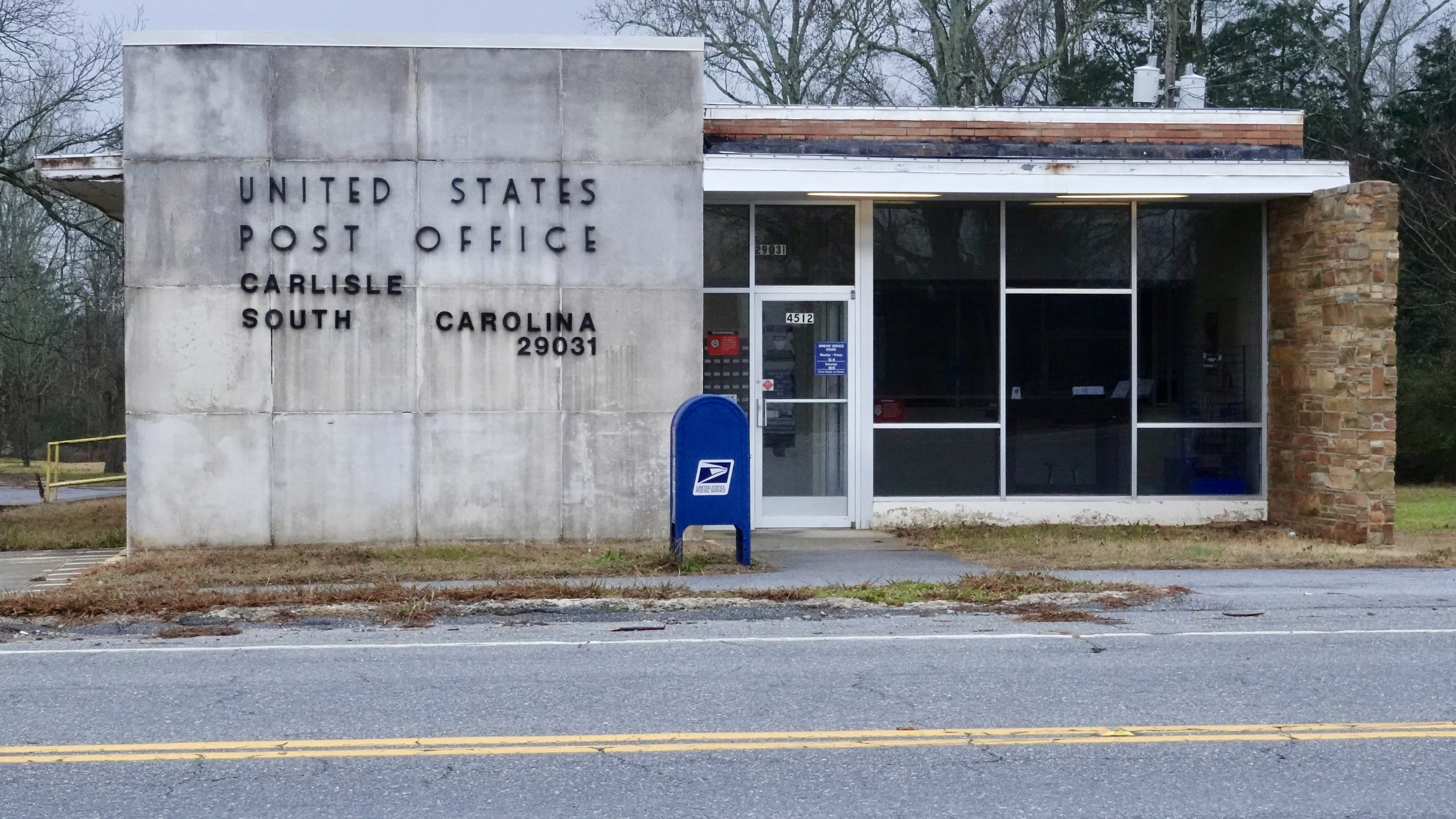
- United States Post Office in Carlisle, SC

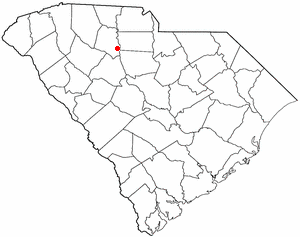
- Location of Carlisle, South Carolina
- Coordinates: 34°35′31″N 81°27′52″W
- Country: United States
- State: South Carolina
- County: Union

Area
  - Total: 1.42 sq mi (3.67 km^{2})
  - Land: 1.42 sq mi (3.67 km^{2})
  - Water: 0 sq mi (0.00 km^{2})
- Elevation: 453 ft (138 m)

Population (2020)
  - Total: 321
  - Density: 226.7/sq mi (87.53/km^{2})
- Time zone: UTC-5 (Eastern (EST))
  - Summer (DST): UTC-4 (EDT)
- ZIP code: 29031
- Area codes: 864, 821
- FIPS code: 45-11755
- GNIS feature ID: 2405379
- Website: www.townofcarlisle.com

Carlisle is a town in Union County, South Carolina, United States. As of the 2020 census, Carlisle had a population of 321.

== History ==
The community was named after Coleman Carlisle, a Methodist minister.

Hillside and Woodland Plantation are listed on the National Register of Historic Places.

== Geography ==
According to the United States Census Bureau, the town has a total area of 1.4 square miles (3.6 km^{2}), all of it land.

== Demographics ==
Historical population
Census	Pop.	Note	%±
1900	358		—
1910	367		2.5%
1920	376		2.5%
1930	382		1.6%
1940	303		−20.7%
1950	405		33.7%
1960	390		−3.7%
1970	670		71.8%
1980	503		−24.9%
1990	470		−6.6%
2000	496		5.5%
2010	436		−12.1%
2020	321		−26.4%
U.S. Decennial Census

=== 2020 census ===
Carlisle town, South Carolina – Racial and ethnic composition Note: the US Census treats Hispanic/Latino as an ethnic category. This table excludes Latinos from the racial categories and assigns them to a separate category. Hispanics/Latinos may be of any race.
Race / Ethnicity (NH = Non-Hispanic)	Pop 2000	Pop 2010	Pop 2020	% 2000	% 2010	% 2020
White alone (NH)	39	39	23	7.86%	8.94%	7.17%
Black or African American alone (NH)	455	383	287	91.73%	87.84%	89.41%
Native American or Alaska Native alone (NH)	0	0	0	0.00%	0.00%	0.00%
Asian alone (NH)	0	1	1	0.00%	0.23%	0.31%
Native Hawaiian or Pacific Islander alone (NH)	0	0	0	0.00%	0.00%	0.00%
Other race alone (NH)	0	0	1	0.00%	0.00%	0.31%
Mixed race or Multiracial (NH)	0	13	8	0.00%	2.98%	2.49%
Hispanic or Latino (any race)	2	0	1	0.40%	0.00%	0.31%
Total	496	436	321	100.00%	100.00%	100.00%

=== 2000 census ===
As of the census of 2000, there were 496 people, 189 households, and 127 families residing in the town. The population density was 350.0 inhabitants per square mile (135.1/km^{2}). There were 223 housing units at an average density of 157.4 per square mile (60.8/km^{2}). The racial makeup of the town was 7.86% White and 92.14% African American. Hispanic or Latino of any race were 0.40% of the population.

There were 189 households, out of which 27.5% had children under the age of 18 living with them, 38.6% were married couples living together, 22.2% had a female householder with no husband present, and 32.8% were non-families. 30.7% of all households were made up of individuals, and 12.7% had someone living alone who was 65 years of age or older. The average household size was 2.62 and the average family size was 3.33.

In the town, the population was spread out, with 25.6% under the age of 18, 8.1% from 18 to 24, 28.8% from 25 to 44, 24.6% from 45 to 64, and 12.9% who were 65 years of age or older. The median age was 37 years. For every 100 females, there were 85.1 males. For every 100 females age 18 and over, there were 76.6 males.

The median income for a household in the town was $21,875, and the median income for a family was $33,750. Males had a median income of $26,667 versus $16,447 for females. The per capita income for the town was $10,190. About 23.6% of families and 26.8% of the population were below the poverty line, including 36.0% of those under age 18 and 39.0% of those age 65 or over.
