= Chesnee, South Carolina =

- City
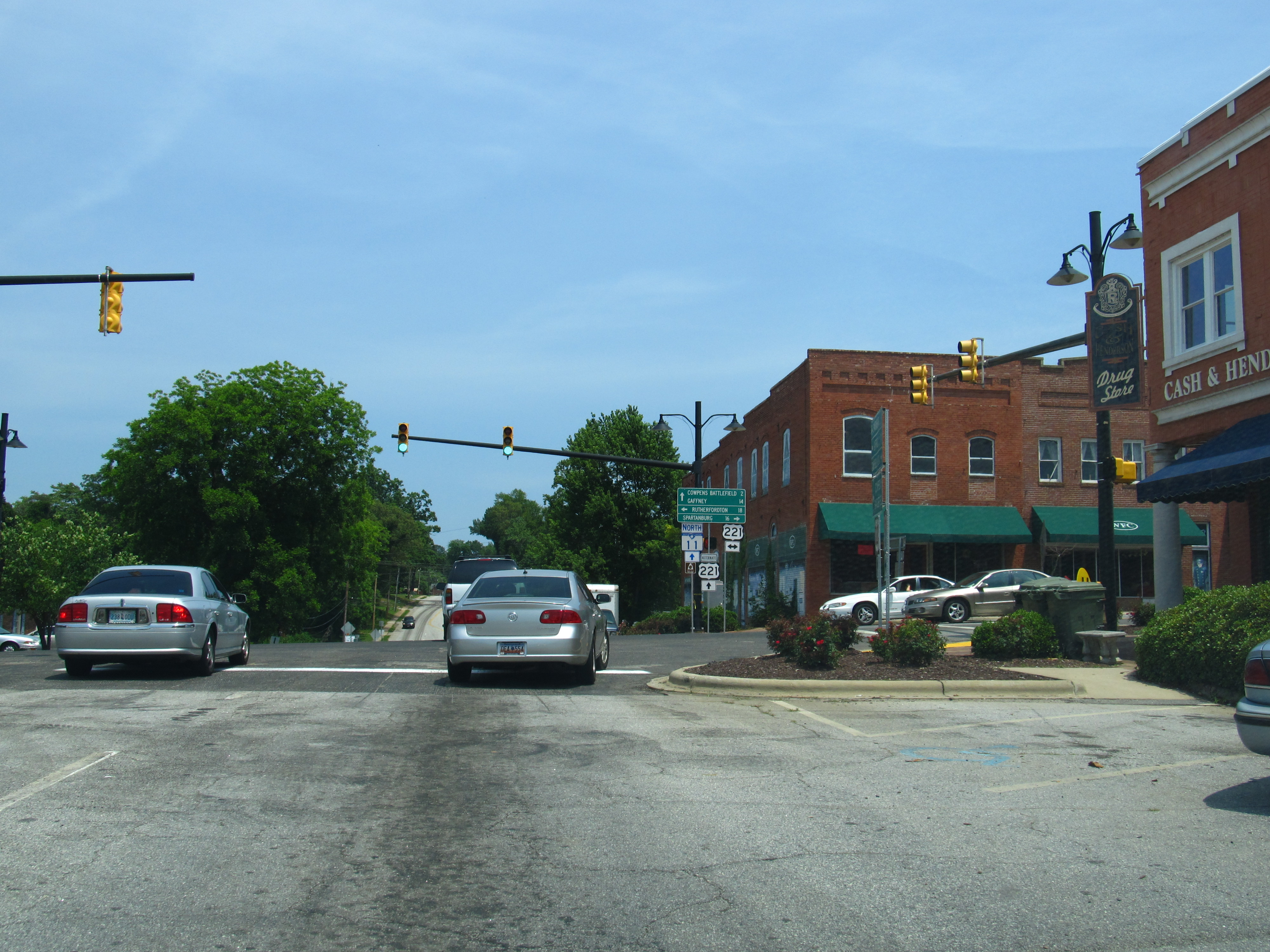
- Street scene in Chesnee

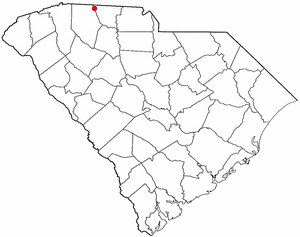
- Location of Chesnee, South Carolina
- Coordinates: 35°08′46″N 81°51′47″W
- Country: United States
- State: South Carolina
- Counties: Spartanburg, Cherokee

Area
  - Total: 1.07 sq mi (2.77 km^{2})
  - Land: 1.07 sq mi (2.77 km^{2})
  - Water: 0 sq mi (0.00 km^{2})
- Elevation: 889 ft (271 m)

Population (2020)
  - Total: 829
  - Density: 774.2/sq mi (298.92/km^{2})
- Time zone: UTC−5 (Eastern (EST))
  - Summer (DST): UTC−4 (EDT)
- ZIP Code: 29323
- Area codes: 864, 821
- FIPS code: 45-14050
- GNIS feature ID: 2404042
- Website: www.cityofchesnee.org

Chesnee is a city in Spartanburg and Cherokee counties, in the U.S. state of South Carolina. As of the 2020 census, Chesnee had a population of 829.

== History ==
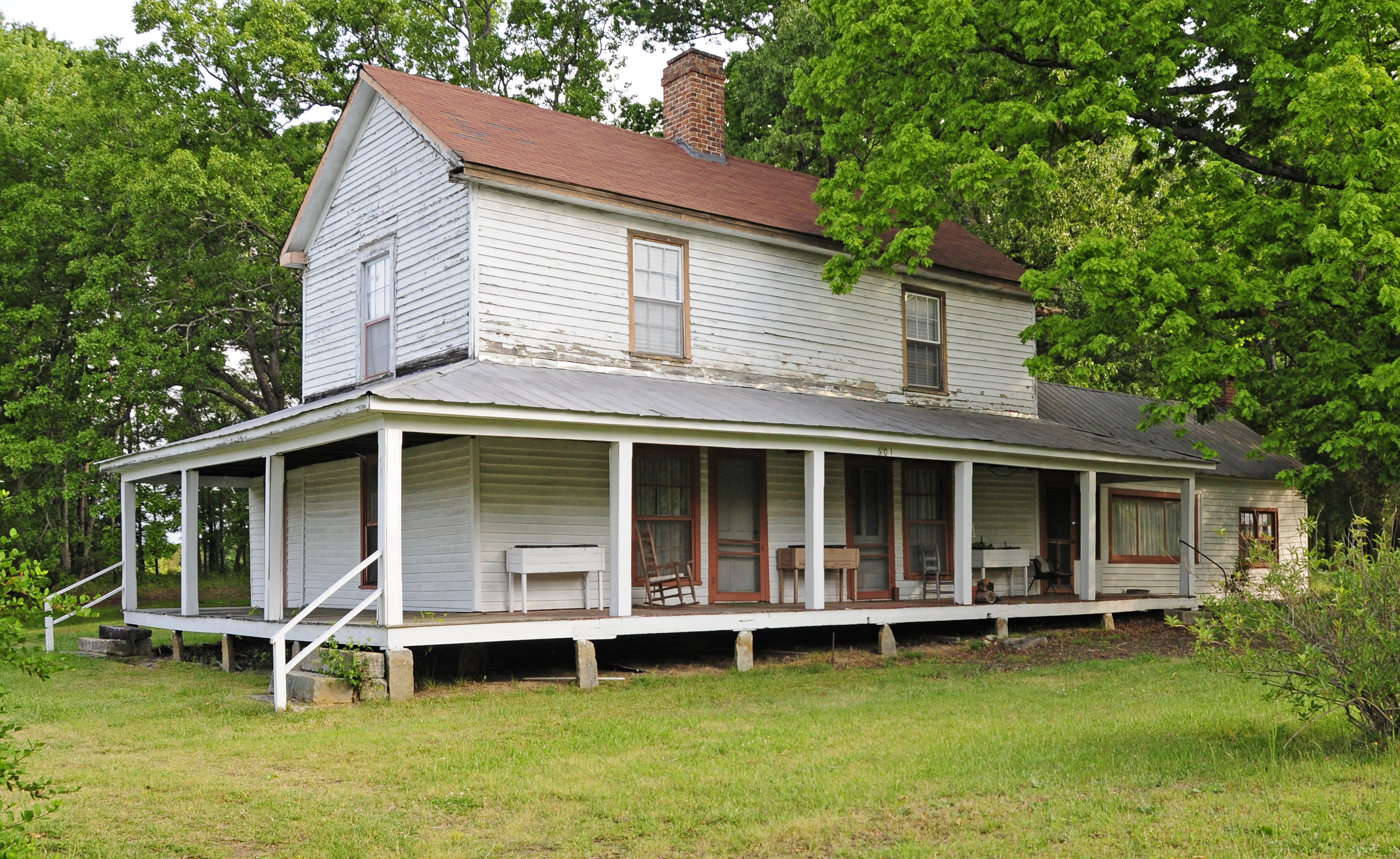
The Zeno Hicks House is listed on the National Register of Historic Places.

In the early 20th century, the Chesnee Land Company bought a sizeable acreage at what is now Chesnee. A leading member of the company was John B. Cleveland of Spartanburg. Cleveland named the company - and later the town - after his great-grandmother, Margaret Chesnee, who was born in Scotland. She married Alexander Vernon, also born in Scotland. The Clinchfield Railroad ran an excursion train over the newly laid rails to Spartanburg on October 23, 1909.

The Chesnee post office was established in 1910, and the town was chartered in 1911. Early businesses included a hotel, pharmacy, cotton mill, and lumber mill.

The Cowpens National Battlefield and Zeno Hicks House are listed on the National Register of Historic Places.

== Geography ==
Chesnee is located near the northeast corner of Spartanburg County, and a small part of the city extends east into Cherokee County. U.S. Route 221 passes through the city as Alabama Avenue and Hampton Street, leading north 18 miles (29 km) to Rutherfordton, North Carolina, and south 16 miles (26 km) to Spartanburg. South Carolina Highway 11 (Cherokee Street) crosses US 221 in the center of town and leads west 19 miles (31 km) to Campobello and east past Cowpens National Battlefield 14 miles (23 km) to Gaffney.

According to the United States Census Bureau, Chesnee has a total area of 1.14 square miles (2.94 km^{2}), all land.

== Demographics ==
Historical population
Census	Pop.	Note	%±
1920	600		—
1930	764		27.3%
1940	827		8.2%
1950	1,051		27.1%
1960	1,045		−0.6%
1970	1,069		2.3%
1980	1,069		0.0%
1990	1,280		19.7%
2000	1,003		−21.6%
2010	868		−13.5%
2020	829		−4.5%
U.S. Decennial Census

=== 2020 census ===
As of the 2020 census, Chesnee had a population of 829. The median age was 37.4 years. 26.1% of residents were under the age of 18 and 18.0% of residents were 65 years of age or older. For every 100 females there were 83.4 males, and for every 100 females age 18 and over there were 79.8 males age 18 and over.

0.0% of residents lived in urban areas, while 100.0% lived in rural areas.

There were 354 households in Chesnee, of which 32.8% had children under the age of 18 living in them. Of all households, 30.2% were married-couple households, 24.0% were households with a male householder and no spouse or partner present, and 40.1% were households with a female householder and no spouse or partner present. About 34.8% of all households were made up of individuals and 14.4% had someone living alone who was 65 years of age or older.

There were 417 housing units, of which 15.1% were vacant. The homeowner vacancy rate was 0.5% and the rental vacancy rate was 5.2%.

Racial composition as of the 2020 census
Race	Number	Percent
White	559	67.4%
Black or African American	193	23.3%
American Indian and Alaska Native	3	0.4%
Asian	4	0.5%
Native Hawaiian and Other Pacific Islander	0	0.0%
Some other race	15	1.8%
Two or more races	55	6.6%
Hispanic or Latino (of any race)	47	5.7%

=== 2000 census ===
As of the census of 2000, there were 1,003 people, 396 households, and 239 families residing in the city. The population density was 1,116.4 inhabitants per square mile (431.0/km^{2}). There were 460 housing units at an average density of 512.0 units per square mile (197.7 units/km^{2}). The racial makeup of the city was 68.20% White, 27.52% African American, 0.30% Native American, 0.10% Asian, 1.99% from other races, and 1.89% from two or more races. Hispanic or Latino people of any race were 4.69% of the population.

There were 396 households, out of which 26.3% had children under the age of 18 living with them, 39.6% were married couples living together, 17.7% had a female householder with no husband present, and 39.4% were non-families. Of all households, 35.4% were made up of individuals, and 13.4% had someone living alone who was 65 years of age or older. The average household size was 2.43 and the average family size was 3.18.

In the city, the population was spread out, with 25.3% under the age of 18, 9.9% from 18 to 24, 26.8% from 25 to 44, 22.2% from 45 to 64, and 15.8% who were 65 years of age or older. The median age was 37 years. For every 100 females, there were 87.8 males. For every 100 females age 18 and over, there were 77.9 males.

The median income for a household in the city was $25,089, and the median income for a family was $33,438. Males had a median income of $30,000 versus $17,500 for females. The per capita income for the city was $12,993. About 16.5% of families and 24.3% of the population were below the poverty line, including 37.6% of those under age 18 and 6.6% of those age 65 or over.

== Education ==
Public education is administered by Spartanburg County School District 2. Three schools are located in Chesnee, including Chesnee High School.

Chesnee has a lending library, a branch of the Spartanburg County Public Library.

== Notable people ==
- Woody Abernathy, repaired broadloom in Chesnee for 30 years after retiring from pitching with the New York Giants
- Stephen Twitty, decorated U.S. Army major general
