= Hickory Grove, South Carolina =

- Town
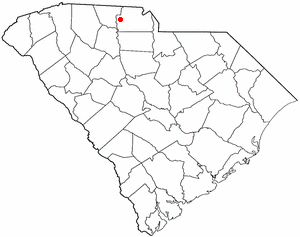
- Location of Hickory Grove, South Carolina
- Coordinates: 34°58′42″N 81°25′05″W
- Country: United States
- State: South Carolina
- County: York

Area
  - Total: 1.67 sq mi (4.33 km^{2})
  - Land: 1.67 sq mi (4.33 km^{2})
  - Water: 0 sq mi (0.00 km^{2})
- Elevation: 646 ft (197 m)

Population (2020)
  - Total: 449
  - Density: 269/sq mi (103.8/km^{2})
- Time zone: UTC-5 (Eastern (EST))
  - Summer (DST): UTC-4 (EDT)
- ZIP code: 29717
- Area codes: 803, 839
- FIPS code: 45-33640
- GNIS feature ID: 2405824
- Website: townofhickorygrove.com

Hickory Grove is a town in York County, South Carolina, United States. The population was 449 at the 2020 census.

== Geography ==
According to the United States Census Bureau, the town has a total area of 1.3 square miles (3.4 km^{2}), all land.

== Demographics ==
Historical population
Census	Pop.	Note	%±
1890	134		—
1900	289		115.7%
1910	285		−1.4%
1920	301		5.6%
1930	318		5.6%
1940	272		−14.5%
1950	275		1.1%
1960	287		4.4%
1970	377		31.4%
1980	344		−8.8%
1990	287		−16.6%
2000	337		17.4%
2010	440		30.6%
2020	449		2.0%
U.S. Decennial Census

As of the census of 2000, there were 337 people, 115 households, and 93 families residing in the town. The population density was 261.0 inhabitants per square mile (100.8/km^{2}). There were 129 housing units at an average density of 99.9 per square mile (38.6/km^{2}). The racial makeup of the town was 69.44% White, 28.78% African American, 0.30% Asian, 0.59% from other races, and 0.89% from two or more races. Hispanic or Latino of any race were 2.37% of the population.

There were 115 households, out of which 40.0% had children under the age of 18 living with them, 62.6% were married couples living together, 13.9% had a female householder with no husband present, and 18.3% were non-families. 13.9% of all households were made up of individuals, and 8.7% had someone living alone who was 65 years of age or older. The average household size was 2.93 and the average family size was 3.28.

In the town, the population was spread out, with 27.3% under the age of 18, 11.0% from 18 to 24, 27.3% from 25 to 44, 23.1% from 45 to 64, and 11.3% who were 65 years of age or older. The median age was 36 years. For every 100 females, there were 104.2 males. For every 100 females age 18 and over, there were 100.8 males.

The median income for a household in the town was $44,000, and the median income for a family was $46,563. Males had a median income of $28,229 versus $20,500 for females. The per capita income for the town was $17,014. 11.6% of the population and 7.2% of families fall below the poverty line. Out of the total population, 16.7% of those under the age of 18 and 12.5% of those 65 and older were living below the poverty line.

== Media ==
Hickory Grove is home to a free daily online and monthly print newspaper, the YoCoNews that covers all of York and Lancaster counties.

== Notable people ==
- Bobby Bolin, former Major League Baseball pitcher for various teams
- Josh Davis, former NFL wide receiver for the various teams
