= Kings Creek =

Kings Creek or King's Creek, or Kingscreek may refer to:

== Places ==
- Kingscreek, Ohio, an unincorporated community
- Kings Creek, South Carolina, an unincorporated community near King's Creek Furnace Site
- Kings Creek, West Virginia, an unincorporated community in Hancock County
- Kings Creek, Queensland, a locality in Toowoomba Region, Australia

== Rivers ==
=== Australia ===
- Kings Creek, at the bottom of Kings Canyon (Northern Territory)

=== Canada ===
- Kings Creek (Jock River tributary), in eastern Ontario
- Kings Creek (Mississippi River Ontario), in eastern Ontario

=== United States ===
- Kings Creek, a tributary of the North Fork Feather River in California
- King's Creek (Maryland)
- Kings Creek (Ohio)
- Kings Creek (Ohio River tributary), a stream in West Virginia and Pennsylvania
- Kings Creek (Elk Creek tributary), in Pennsylvania
- King's Creek (Texas)

== Other ==
- Kings Creek Falls, a waterfall near Long Creek, South Carolina
- Kings Creek Station, an agricultural and tourism property in the Northern Territory of Australia

== See also ==
- King Creek (disambiguation)
- Kings (disambiguation)
- Kings River (disambiguation)
