= Triple C Rail Trail =

Rail trail in South Carolina, United States

Charleston, Cincinnati and Chicago (Triple C) Rail Trail
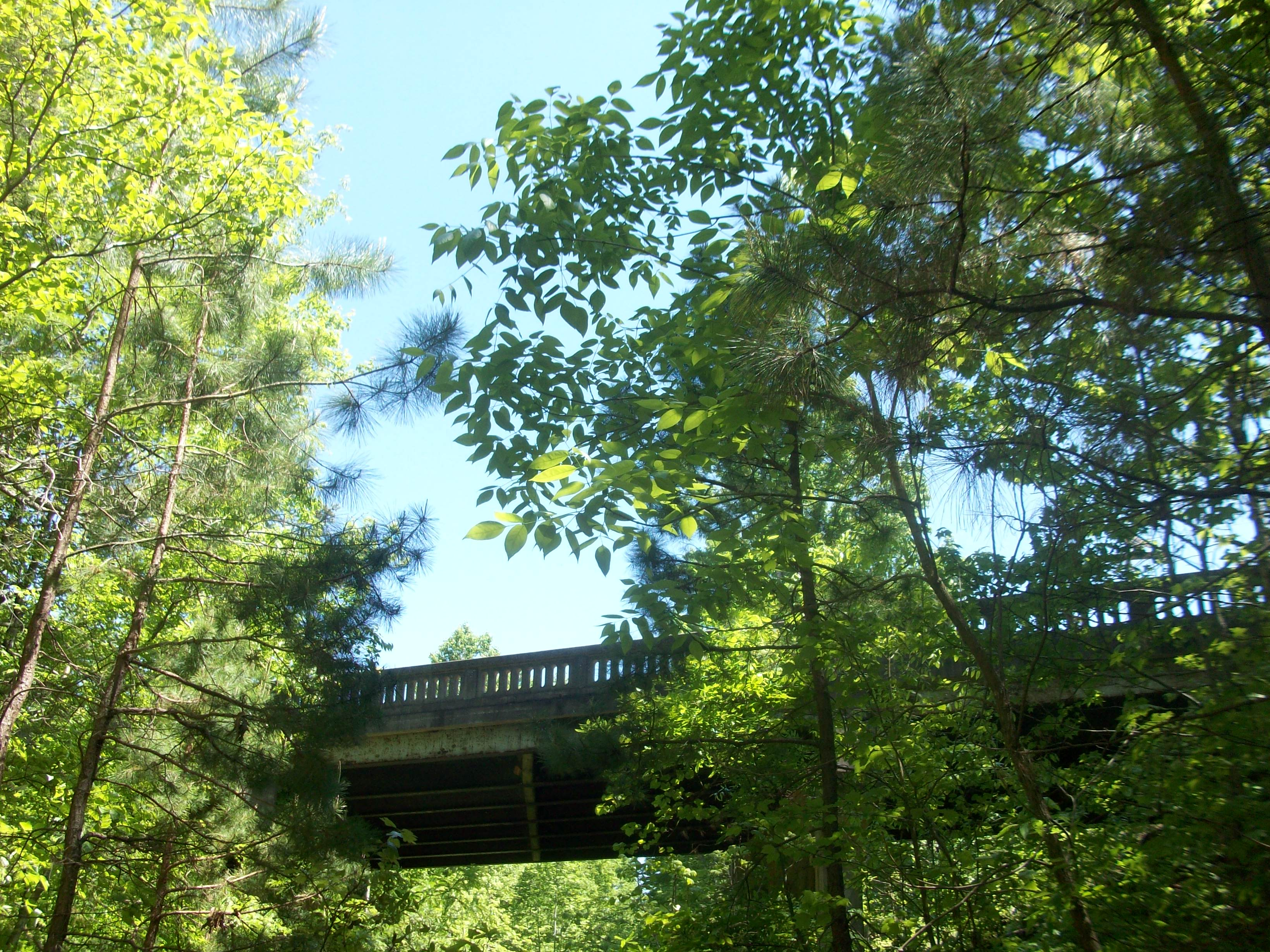
- Triple C Rail Trail passing under SC Hwy 97 in Smyrna, SC

Triple C Rail Trail
- Length: 23-mile (37 km)
- Location: York, and Cherokee counties South Carolina, United States
- Established: Late 1995
- Trailheads: Plains LPG Svc LP Tirzah 34.998882°N 81.176147°W Hollifield Dr @ Manning Rd Kings Creek 35.073771°N 81.437139°W
- Use: Hiking, running, walking, rollerblading, skateboarding, dog walking, horseback riding, mountain biking and cycling
- Grade: Gentle (former railroad)
- Difficulty: Easy
- Season: Year round
- Sights: James Ross Wildlife Reservation, hawks, Canada geese, possum, squirrels, raccoons, rabbits and occasionally wild turkeys, and white-tailed deer
- Hazards: Severe weather, poison ivy, occasionally snakes
- Surface: crushed limestone, Asphalt
- Right of way: Norfolk Southern most recent operator
- Website: http://www.triplecrailtrail.com

The Charleston, Cincinnati and Chicago or Triple C Rail Trail is a rail trail in the Piedmont region of north-central South Carolina.

The trail begins just west of Tirzah, runs west through York, James Ross Wildlife Reservation (a South Carolina Department of Natural Resources Wildlife Management Area), Sharon, Hickory Grove, Smyrna, and ends near Kings Creek.

Please note, as of 4/18/15 all sections of this trail (except for the part shared by the paved York Bicycle Trail) are so overgrown as to be impassible. Also there is no signage of any kind signifying it exits at all. Use discretion. Passable sections are indicated in Google Maps as dirt bicycle trails - 7/25/16 route does get overgrown as SCDOT does not maintain the trail although owns the full right of way, which is indicated by county GIS maps.

== Route ==
The rail trail crosses under SC Hwy 97 in downtown Smyrna, South Carolina's smallest town.

The Triple C Rail Trail is approximately 23 miles (37 km) from end to end, and it generally follows an east–west orientation. The trail is located wholly within York and Cherokee counties.

The trail's eastern terminus is off South Carolina Highway 161 near the Plains Midstream Canada Tirzah Propane Storage Facility, about 4 miles (6.4 km) east of York. The trail roughly parallels Highway 161 in a westerly direction for about 4 miles (6.4 km) until it reaches the city of York. Heading southwest out of york the trail passes under the Kings Mountain Railroad Trail and US Route 321. The trail strikes out through woodlands west of York as it heads towards Sharon. Along the way it passes through the James Ross Wildlife Reservation. Approximately 6 miles (9.7 km) west of York, the trail passes through the town of Sharon.The section between York and Sharon is fairly remote, and not easily accessible by road.

A half mile outside Sharon, the trail begins running parallel to SC Hwy 211 for about 4 miles (6.4 km). Just before entering Hickory Grove, the trail moves eastward to run through the east side of town. North of Hickory Grove, the trail parallels South Carolina Highway 97 for approximately 3 miles (4.8 km) until the trail reaches the town of Smyrna. Beyond Smyrna the trail enters Cherokee County and roughly parallels SC Hwy 97 until the trail ends near the intersection of Hollifield Drive and Manning Road near Kings Creek.

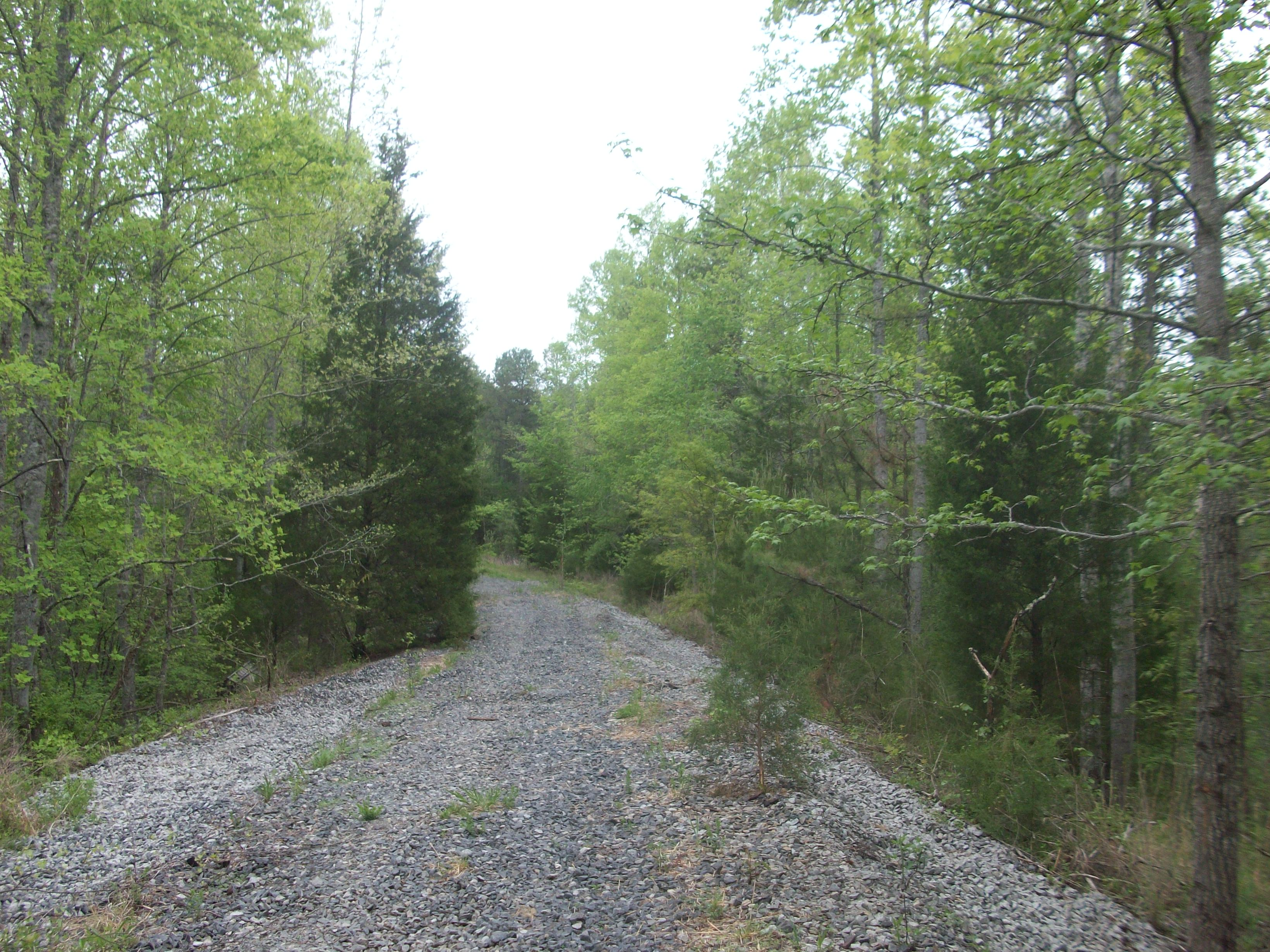
A view of the Triple C Rail Trail near Kings Creek, South Carolina. The track was removed from this section around 2007.

Cities, Towns and attractions located along or near the trail (from east to west):

- Tirzah
- York
- Kings Mtn Railroad Trail in York
- James Ross Wildlife Reservation
- Sharon
- Hill's Mercantile
- Hickory Grove
- Smyrna - The smallest town in South Carolina
- Kings Creek

== History ==
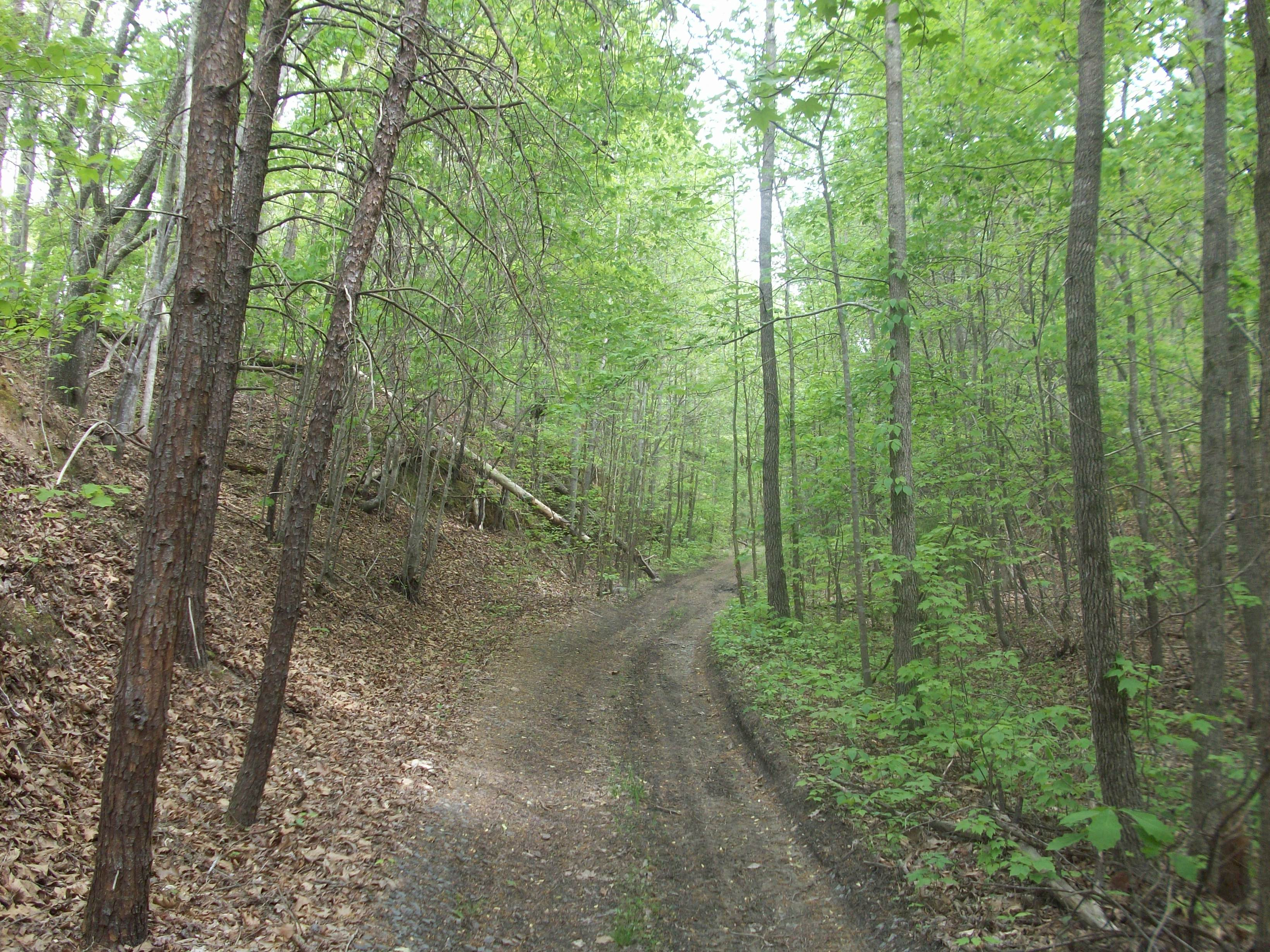
View of the Triple C Rail Trail through the woods, west of Smyrna, SC.

The trail runs along the abandoned right of way of the Charleston, Cincinnati and Chicago Railroad, or Triple C. The section of railroad between Tirzah and Smyrna was constructed between 1886 and 1889.

After a series of reorganizations, the railroad became a part of the Southern Railway and eventually Norfolk Southern. Freight and passenger service continued for many years. In the mid-1980s, Norfolk Southern ended rail service between York and Smyrna. Then again in the late 1980s Norfolk Southern ended service between York and Tirzah. The tracks were removed, and the first section of the Triple C Rail Trail opened as part of the York Bicycle Trail in the late 1990s. Around the same time a second portion was opened across the James Ross Wildlife Reservation. The trail continued opening in stages with the most recent section (near Kings Creek, South Carolina) being completed in 2007. The trail is operated by the City of York, the South Carolina Department of Natural Resources and SCDOT.

== Activities ==
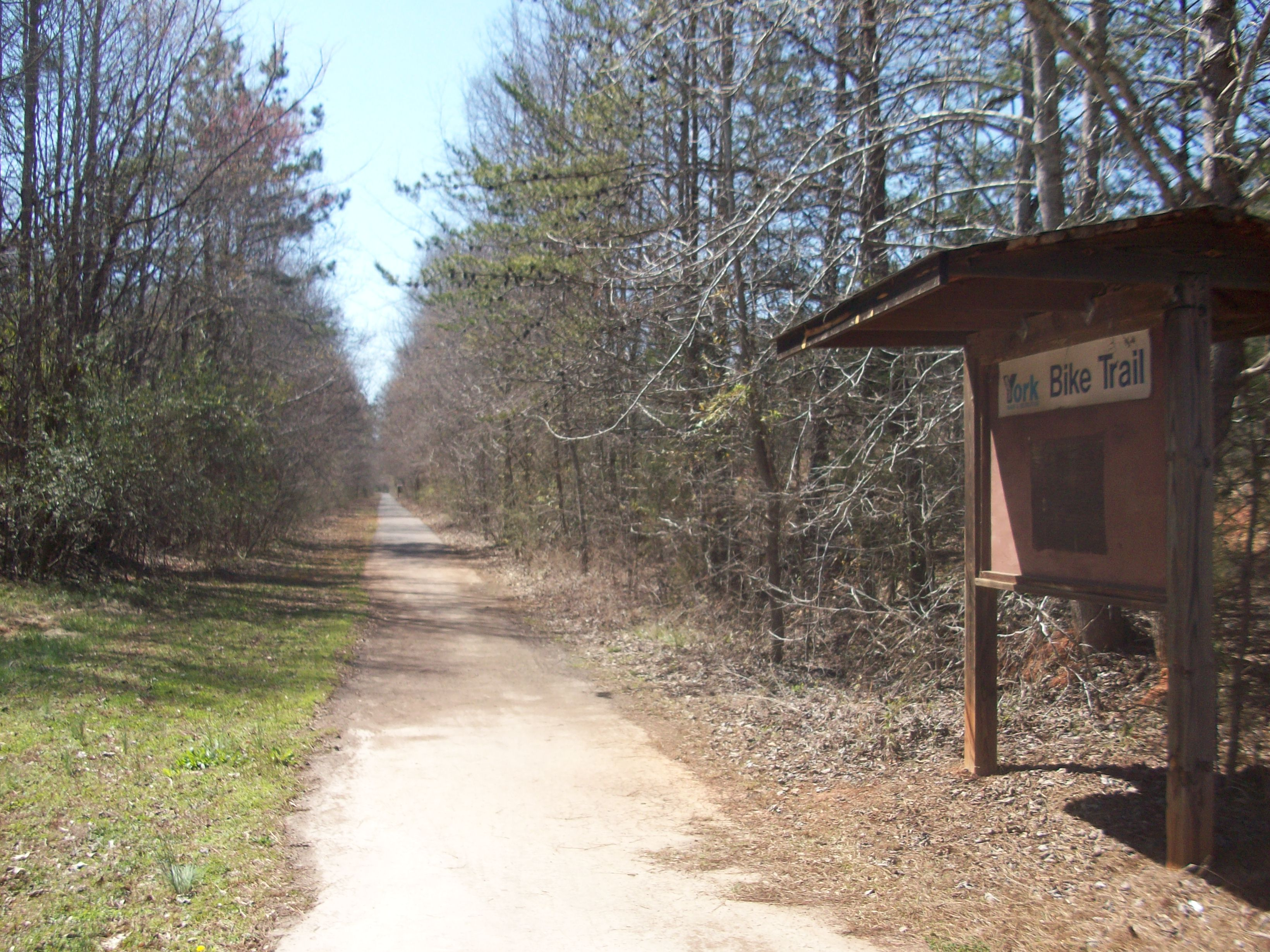
A combined section of the Triple C Rail Trail and the York Bicycle Trail near the York Recreation Complex in York.

The trail is relatively flat with only gentle grades. It is topped with crushed limestone along most of the trail and Asphalt within the city of York. Bicycling and hiking are extremely popular during the spring, summer, and fall. Horseback riding is allowed on the western end of the trail, between Kings Creek and Smyrna. The trail intersects with two other hiking trails, including the Kings Mtn Railroad Trail.

Wildlife viewing is also popular. Hawks and other large birds are commonly seen along the trail. Canada geese and ducks are also common. wild turkeys and white-tailed deer live in the wooded areas and are seen along the trail.

Motorized vehicles are strictly forbidden from using the trail. This ban includes motorcycles, snowmobiles and all-terrain vehicles.

Camping is currently not allowed along the trail. Numerous lodging establishments are available in York. Hunting of white-tailed deer, wild turkey, small game and furbearers is allowed within the James Ross Wildlife Reservation, authorization is needed from the SCDNR.

Parking areas are available at several locations along the entire length of the trail. Trail users should carry enough water to last for the duration of their trips, as potable water is not readily available. The City of York offers a full array of services and supplies. Restaurants are located in York and Sharon. Gasoline and other supplies are available at general stores located in York, Sharon and Hickory Grove.

== Future expansion ==
The last section of the trail to open was in 2007, and there are no immediate plans to expand the trail at this time. However, several future plans exist, including one to incorporate portions of the trail, along with an extension to Rock Hill, as part of the Carolina Thread Trail

== See also ==
- List of rail trails in South Carolina
- Carolina Thread Trail
