= Sharon Historic District =

Sharon Historic District may refer to:

- Sharon Historic District (Sharon, Connecticut), listed on the NRHP in Litchfield County, Connecticut
- Sharon Valley Historic District, Sharon, Connecticut, listed on the NRHP in Litchfield County, Connecticut
- Sharon Cemetery Historic District, Farmington, Iowa, listed on the NRHP in Lee County, Iowa
- Sharon Historic District (Sharon, Massachusetts), listed on the NRHP in Massachusetts
- Sharon Springs Historic District, Sharon Springs, New York, listed on the NRHP in New York
- Sharon Center Public Square Historic District, Sharon Center, Ohio, listed on the NRHP in Medina County, Ohio
- Sharon Downtown Historic District, Sharon, South Carolina, listed on the NRHP in York County, South Carolina

== See also ==
- Sharon (disambiguation)
