= King Creek =

King Creek may refer to:

== United States ==
- King Arroyo, a stream in Otero County, Colorado
- King Creek (Crow River tributary), a stream in Minnesota
- King Creek (New York), a stream
- King Creek, a stream in Tishomingo, Mississippi

== Other places ==
- King Creek, Ontario, an unincorporated community in Canada
- King Creek, an area in Wauchope, New South Wales, Australia

== See also ==
- King River (disambiguation)
- Kings Creek (disambiguation)
