= James Ross Wildlife Reservation =

Wildlife reserve in South Carolina

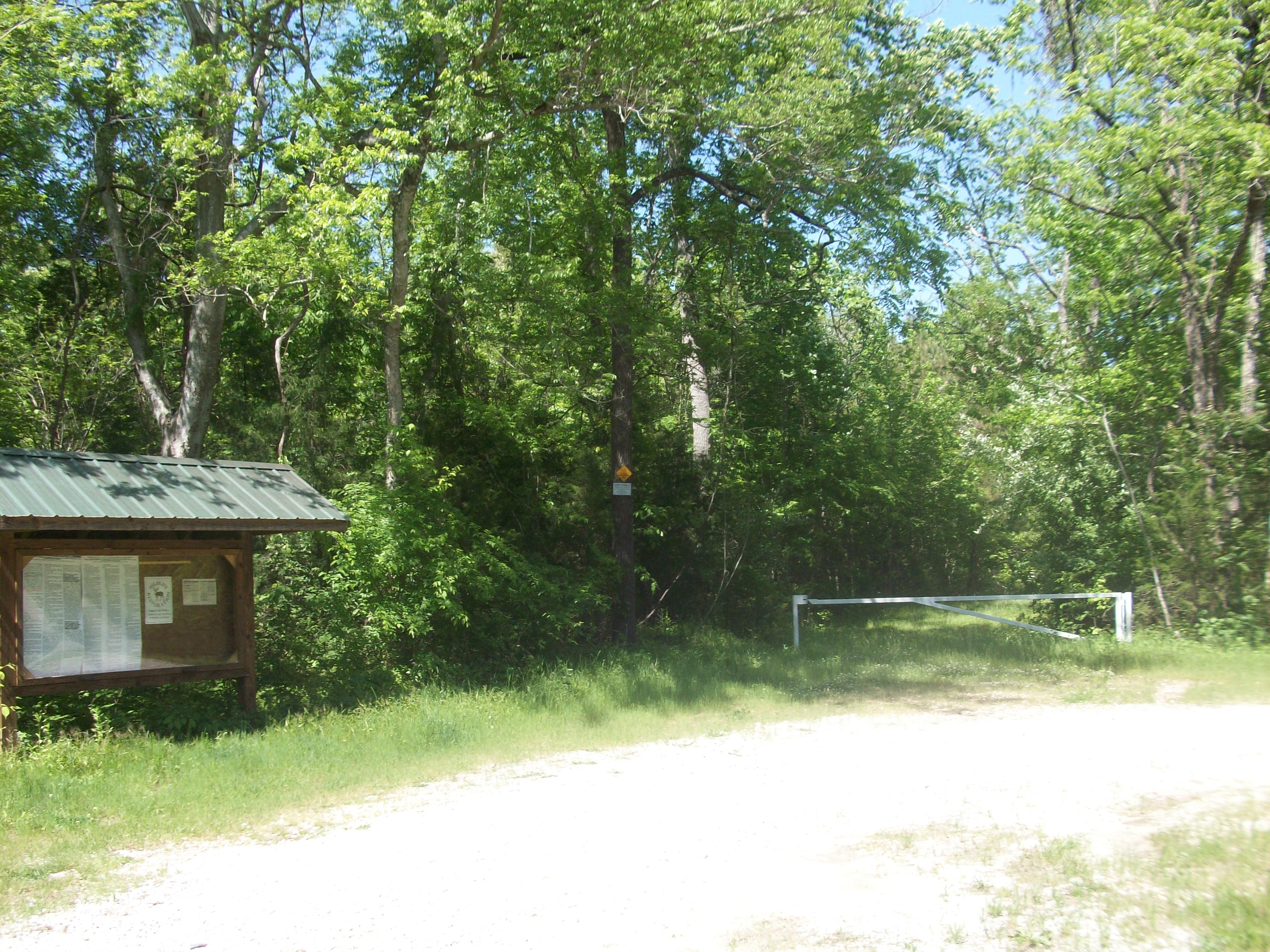
- Entrance to the James Ross Wildlife Management Area

- Location within South Carolina
- Location: York, Sharon, York County, South Carolina, South Carolina, United States
- Coordinates: 34°57′54″N 81°16′51.6″W
- Area: 305 acres (123 ha)
- Established: October 4, 1995
- Governing body: South Carolina Department of Natural Resources
- Website: James Ross Wildlife Reservation

James Ross Wildlife Reservation is a South Carolina Wildlife Management Area located near York and Sharon managed by the South Carolina Department of Natural Resources.

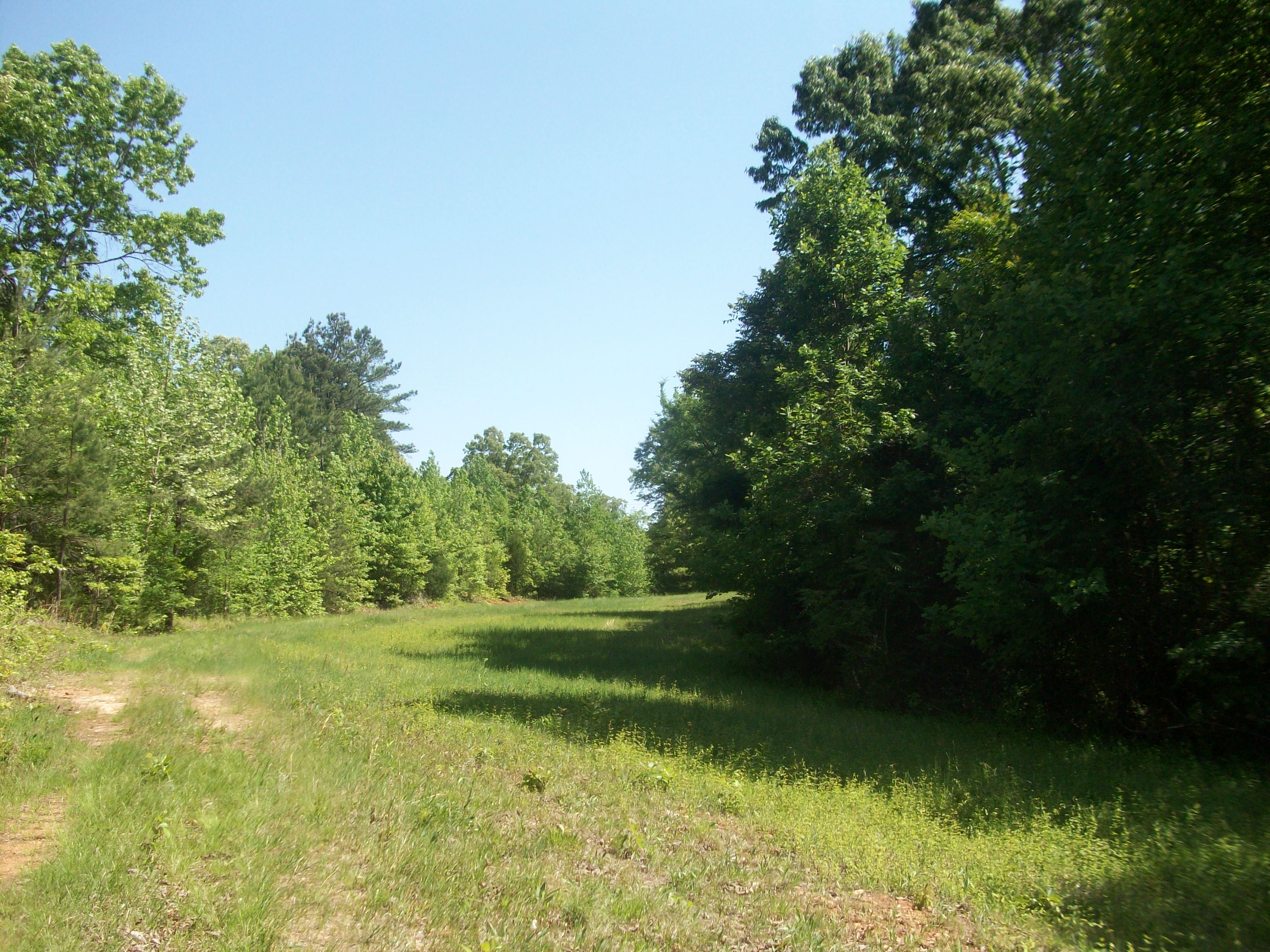
View of the access trail headed towards the entrance to the James Ross Wildlife Reservation

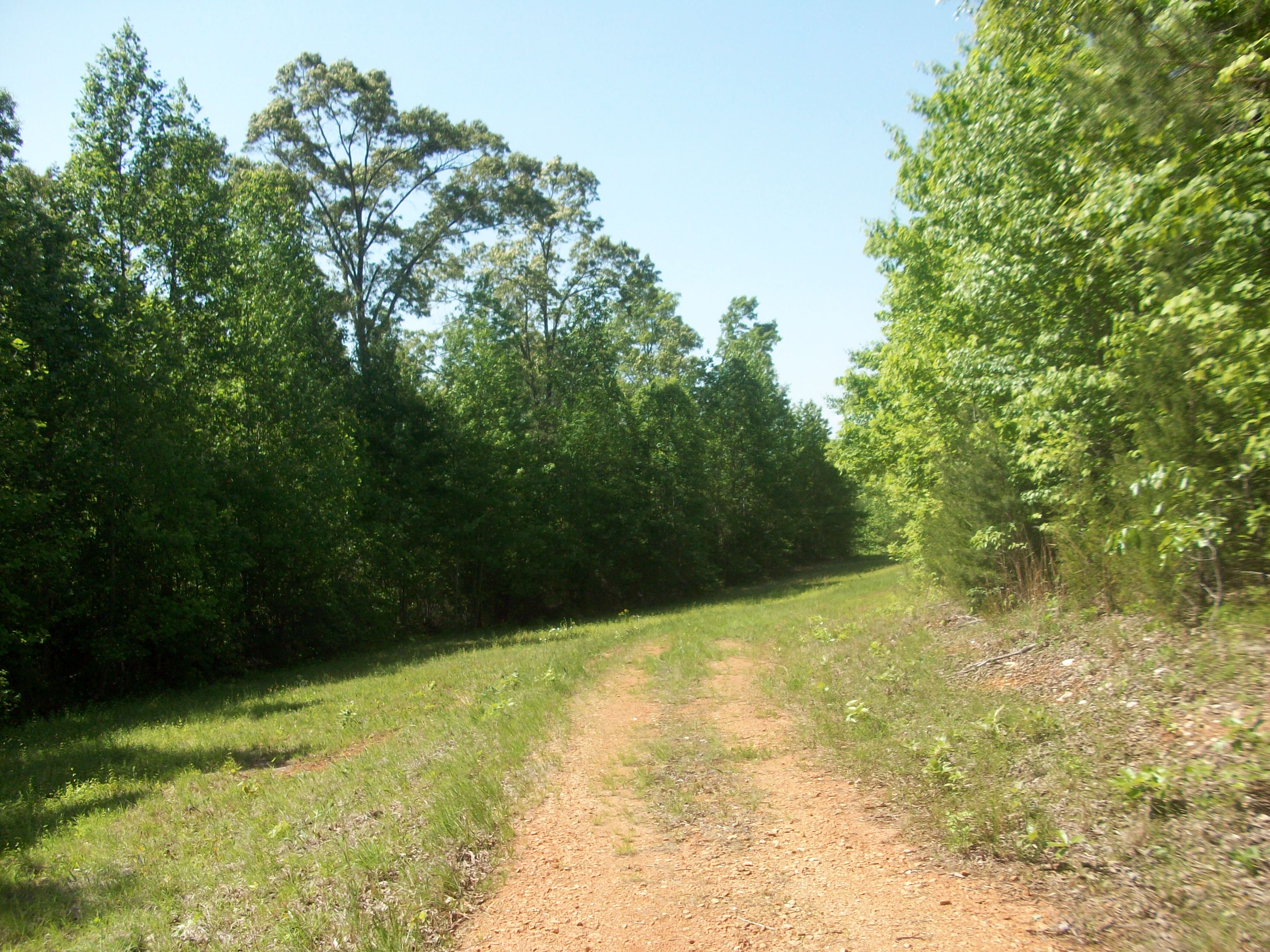
View looking towards the Triple C Rail Trail along the access trail in the James Ross Wildlife Reservation

== History ==
The property is believed to be named after James Ross, born in 1744, and who owned 300 acres of land in the Bethesda area. Ross fought on the side of the Patriots during the Battle of Huck’s Defeat in 1780 near Brattonsville, South Carolina. The South Carolina Department of Natural Resources (DNR) established The James Ross Wildlife Reservation on October 4, 1995. The 305 acre plat of land was donated to the DNR by Ms. Kitty W. Sandifer, a retired school teacher from nearby York, SC. Ms. Sandifer was born on the property and lived to be 96 years of age before her death in February 1994. In her will, drawn up by John Spratt, Ms. Sandifer requested that this property be known as the James Ross Wildlife Reservation. A parking area is available and a sign dedicating the tract is present.

== Activities and amenities ==
- Trails: There are two trails on the property. A portion of the 23-mile (37 km) Triple C Rail Trail, running east–west from York to Sharon, also crosses the property.
- Hunting: Hunting of white-tailed deer, wild turkey, small game and furbearers is allowed within the Game Zone 2 seasons and bag limits.
- Nature Viewing: Pine timber stands comprise about 150 acres and are primarily natural shortleaf, some Virginia pine and two small areas of loblolly pine. A significant number of desirable mast-producing hardwood species such as red oak, white oak, hickory, beech and dogwood occur on the tract and account for approximately 145 acres. Several small wildlife openings are present.
