= Sharon Township, Ohio =

Sharon Township, Ohio may refer to:

- Sharon Township, Franklin County, Ohio
- Sharon Township, Medina County, Ohio
- Sharon Township, Noble County, Ohio
- Sharon Township, Richland County, Ohio

== See also ==
- Sharon Township (disambiguation)
