= Hosewells Branch =

Stream in Talbot County, Maryland, U.S.

Coordinates: 38.7912261°N 76.021884°W

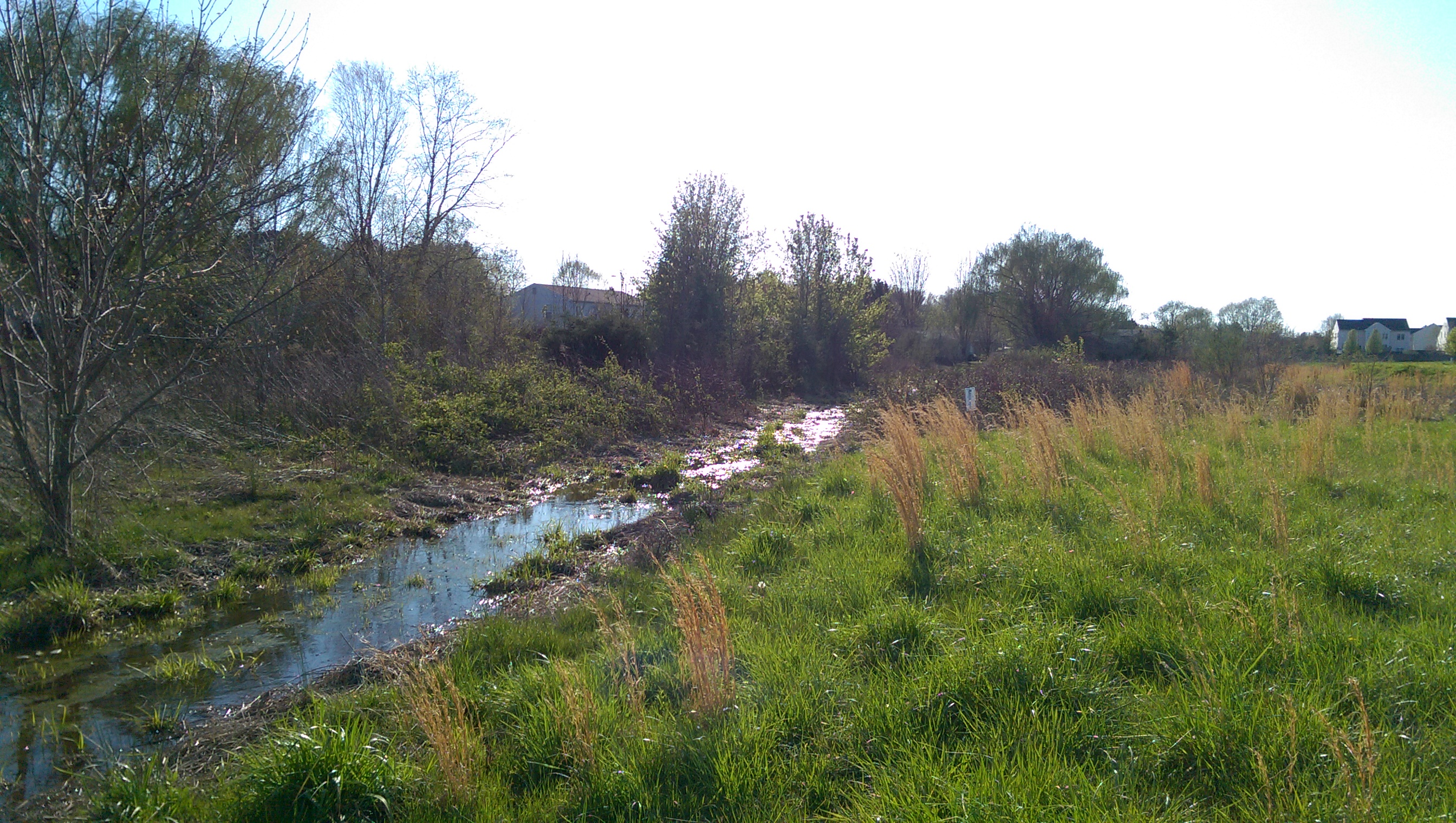
Hosewells Branch in Easton MD as it comes to end near the Forest Reservation Area in the neighborhood Bretridge.

Hosewells Branch is a stream in Talbot County, Maryland, running for about 1.8 miles (2.9 km) near the town of Easton at an average elevation of 12 feet (3.7 m). It flows into King's Creek, and thence into the Choptank River and Chesapeake Bay.
