= West Liberty-Salem High School =

Public school in Ohio, United States

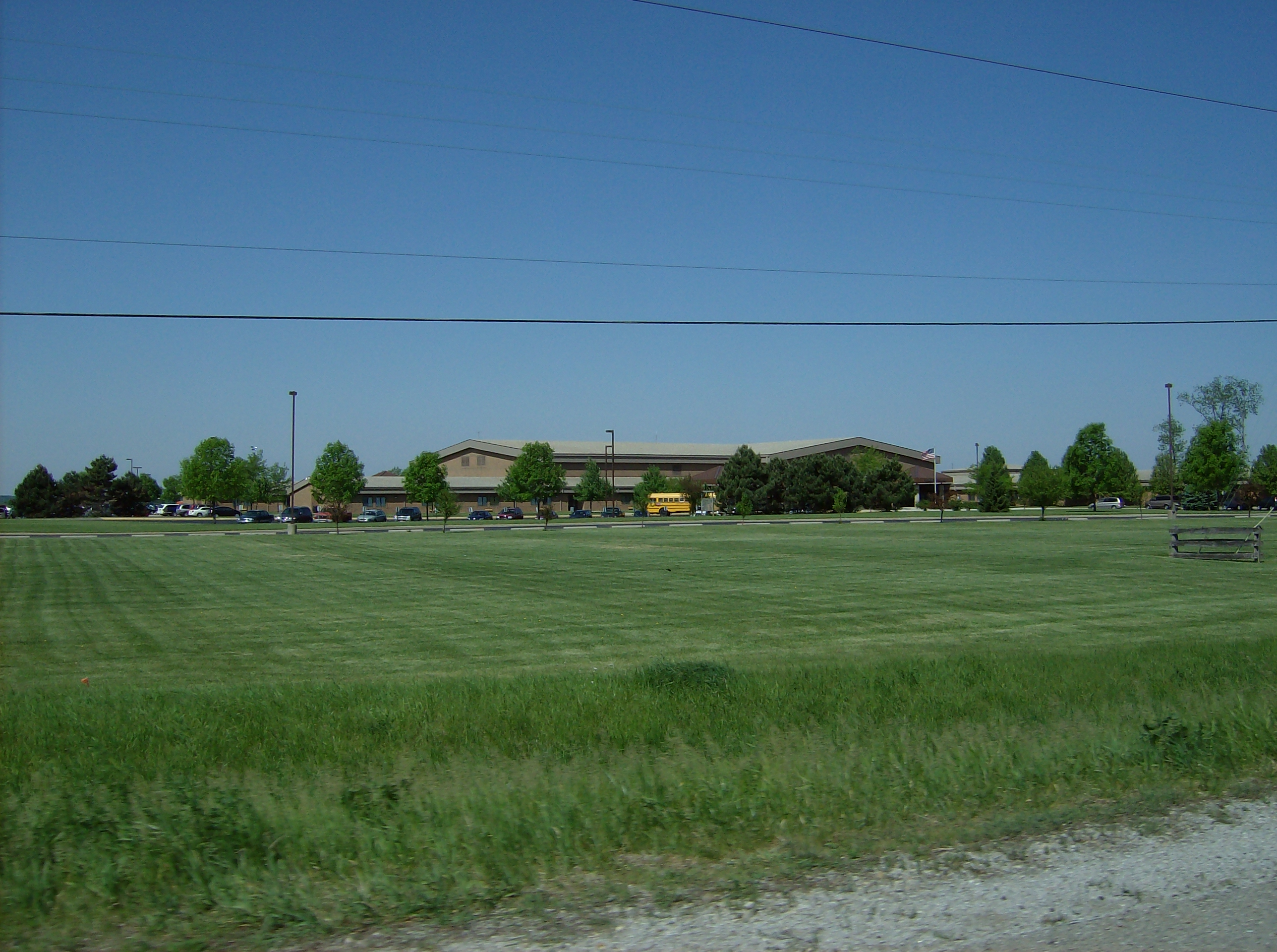
- View of West Liberty-Salem High School from U.S. Route 68

Location
- 7208 US Highway N 68; West Liberty, Champaign County, Ohio 43357; United States; 40°12′55.35″N 83°45′14.73″W

Information
- Type: Public, Coeducational high school
- Motto: Dedicated to helping students reach their full potential.
- Established: 1961; 65 years ago
- NCES District ID: 3904621
- Educational authority: West Liberty-Salem Board Of Education
- Superintendent: Kraig Hissong
- NCES School ID: 390462102472
- Dean: Andy McGill
- Principal: Greg Johnson
- Grades: 9–12
- Enrollment: 366 (2024–25)
- Student to teacher ratio: 15.91
- Colors: Black and Orange
- Fight song: On You Tigers (On Wisconsin)
- Athletics conference: Ohio Heritage Conference
- Sports: Football, Boys and Girls Basketball, Baseball, Softball, Wrestling, Track & Field, Football and Basketball Cheerleading Cross Country, Girls Volleyball, Boys Golf, Boys and Girls Soccer, Marching Band, Quick Recall, Science Olympiad, and Boys and Girls Bowling.
- Mascot: Tina the Tiger
- Nickname: West Lib, WLS
- Team name: Tigers
- Newspaper: Jungle News Digital Magazine
- Yearbook: WeLiSaHi Yearbook
- Communities served: West Liberty and Kingscreek, Ohio
- Affiliation: Ohio High Point Career Center, Edison State Community College
- Website: www.wlstigers.org
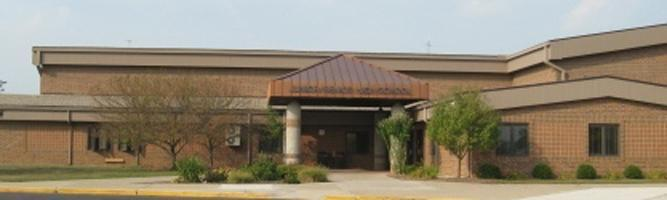

West Liberty-Salem High School is a public high school in Salem Township, Champaign County, Ohio, United States. The only high school in the West Liberty-Salem School District, it is situated along U.S. Route 68 between West Liberty, Urbana.

West Liberty-Salem partners with Edison State Community College In Piqua, Ohio to allow students in grades 7-12 to take college level courses free of charge, and with Ohio High Point Career In Bellefontaine, Ohio to allow students in grades 11 and 12 to take vocational courses.

West Liberty-Salem is the only school in Champaign County that has a Science Olympiad program at the middle school level.

West Liberty-Salem is well known for the success of its track and field and cross country programs having won a total of 23 high school Track and Field OHC championships and a total of 29 high school OHC championships in cross country.

== History ==
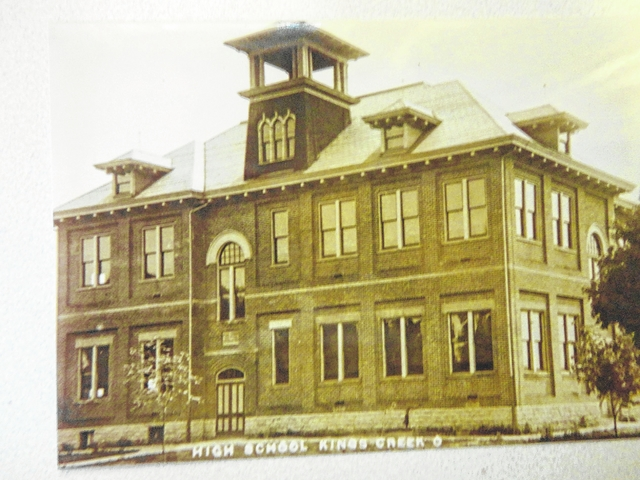
Salem Township High School in 1908, the structure still stands in Kingscreek, OH today but now houses apartments.

West Liberty-Salem High School was formed in 1961 when West Liberty High School (West Liberty, OH) and Salem Township High School (Kingscreek, OH) merged. In 1985 the West Liberty-Salem School District began construction on a new comprehensive school complex along U.S. Highway 68 just south of West Liberty, opening in 1989, the complex is still being used today.

In 2011, then-high school Track and Field athlete Meghan Vogel made national headlines for carrying a fallen runner to the finish line.

West Liberty-Salem has conducted several renovations since 1989 including new high school science classrooms in 2016, new kindergarten and first grade classrooms in 2015 and the installation of blinds over the windows on all doors in 2017.

On January 20, 2017 there was a shooting injuring two students, one critically. 17-year-old student Ely Serna was charged in the incident and was sentenced to 23 years in prison.

The school began raising funds in 2019 for an athletic field house which would include bathrooms, locker rooms, a weight room, a basketball court and a track.. The field house is set to be complete in the fall of 2026.

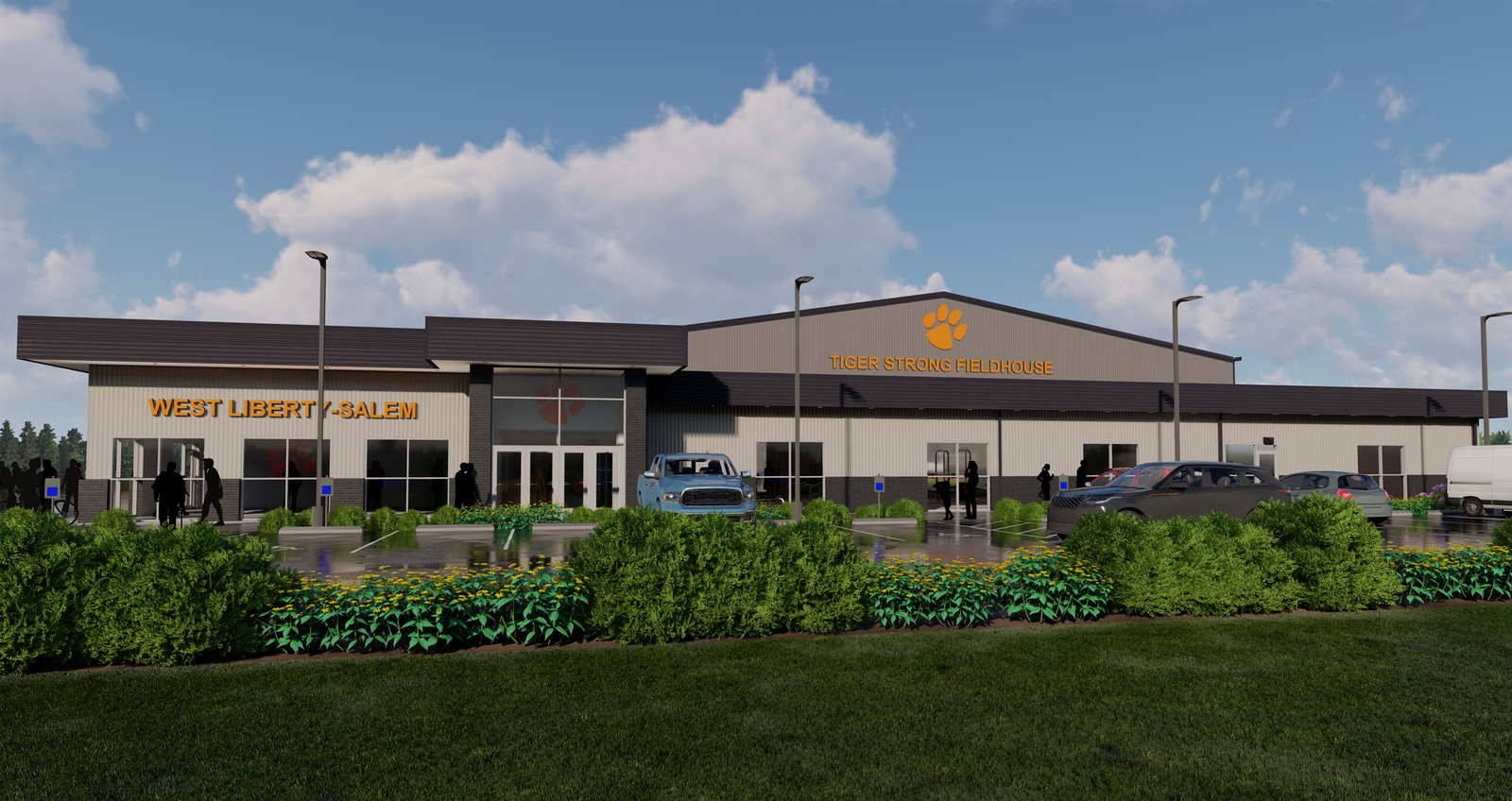

== Ohio High School Athletic Association State Championships ==
- Girls Cross Country - 2020
- Girls Track & Field - 2019, 2021
- Boys Wrestling – 1991
- Boys Cross Country – 1976, 1977, 1978, 1979
- Boys Basketball (Salem High School) - 1960

== Ohio Heritage Conference Championships ==
- Boys Football - 2004, 2009, 2011, 2012, 2014, 2019, 2023, 2024
- Boys Basketball - 2006, 2016, 2018, 2020, 2024
- Boys Bowling - 2014
- Boys Baseball - 2002, 2005, 2006, 2010, 2024
- Boys Track & Field - 2004, 2005, 2007, 2011, 2012, 2013, 2015, 2016, 2017, 2021, 2022, 2023, 2024, 2025, 2026
- Boys Cross Country - 2001, 2002, 2003, 2009, 2010, 2011, 2012, 2013, 2014, 2015, 2016, 2018, 2019, 2021, 2022, 2023, 2024, 2025
- Boys Soccer - 2022
- Boys Golf - 2010, 2011, 2012, 2013, 2014, 2016
- Wrestling - 2005
- Girls Volleyball - 2008, 2009, 2010, 2011, 2012, 2025
- Girls Basketball - 2003, 2005, 2006, 2007, 2008, 2009, 2010, 2011, 2016, 2017, 2018, 2019, 2021, 2025, 2026
- Girls Softball - 2004, 2005, 2006, 2007, 2008, 2009, 2010, 2011, 2012, 2017, 2018
- Girls Track & Field - 2002, 2003, 2004, 2005, 2009, 2010, 2012, 2013, 2014, 2015, 2016, 2017, 2018, 2019, 2021, 2022, 2023, 2024, 2025
- Girls Soccer - 2014, 2015, 2017, 2018, 2022, 2023
- Girls Cross Country - 2001, 2002, 2003, 2004, 2005, 2006, 2007, 2008, 2009, 2010, 2011, 2012, 2014, 2015, 2016, 2017, 2018, 2019, 2020, 2021, 2022, 2023, 2024, 2025

The West Liberty-Salem boys set a school record during the 2023-2024 school year winning a total of 5 conference championships (Football, Cross Country, Basketball, Baseball, and Track & Field). The boys and girls 8 conference championships in 2023-2024 tied a school record for total combined (2012-2013, 2010-2011, 2009–2010, 2005-2006).
