= List of rail trails in South Carolina =

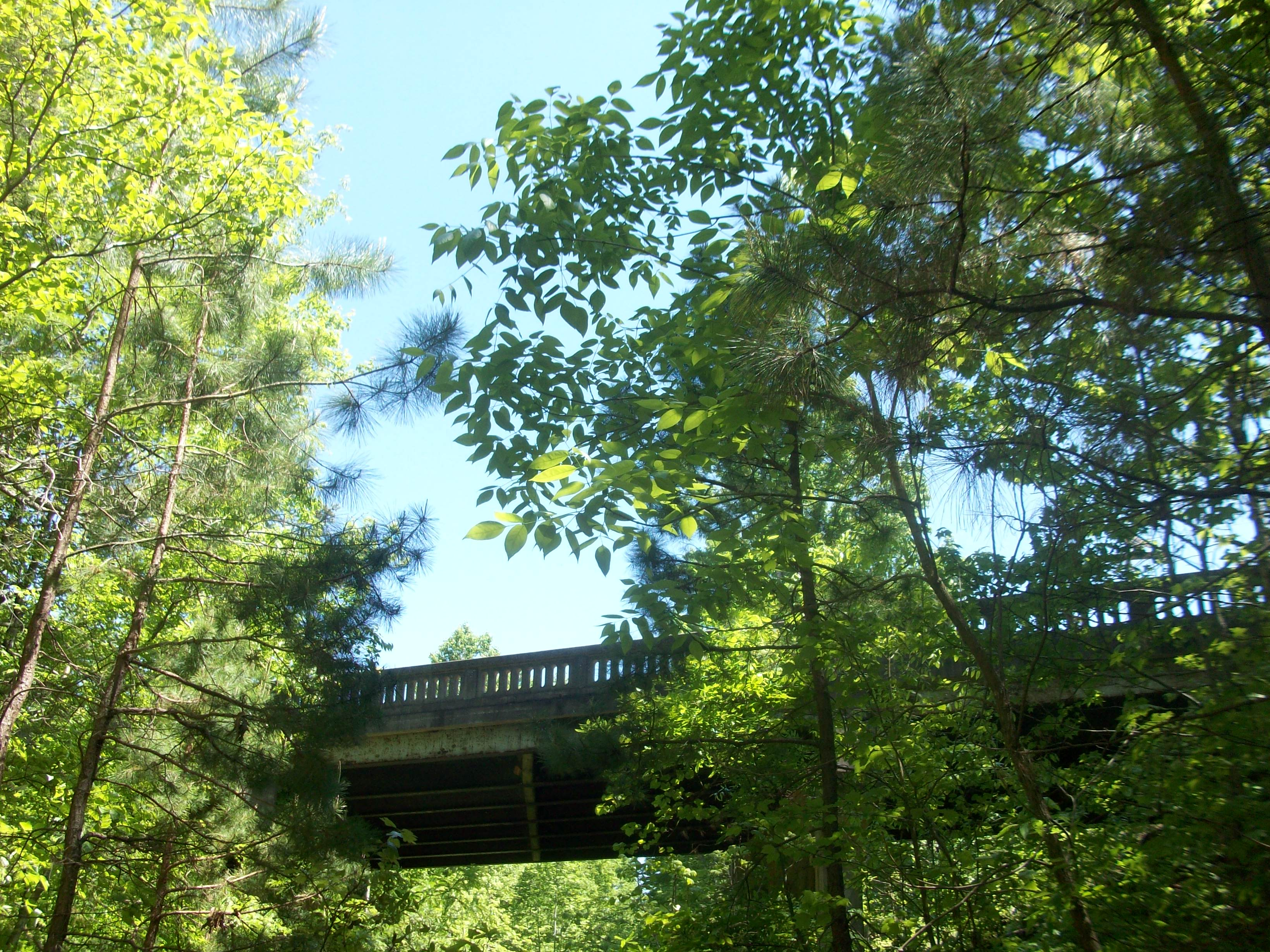
Triple C Rail Trail passing under SC Hwy 97 in Smyrna, South Carolina

This List of rail trails in South Carolina lists former railroad right-of-ways in South Carolina that have been converted to rail trails designed for pedestrian, bicycle, skating, and/or equestrian traffic. Rail trails are multi-use paths offering at least pedestrians and cyclists recreational access to the routes for public use.

South Carolina contains a total of 16 different rail trails. The trails cover a total of 158.1-mile (254.4 km) and up to an additional 763-mile (1,228 km) have been proposed.

== UPCOUNTRY ==
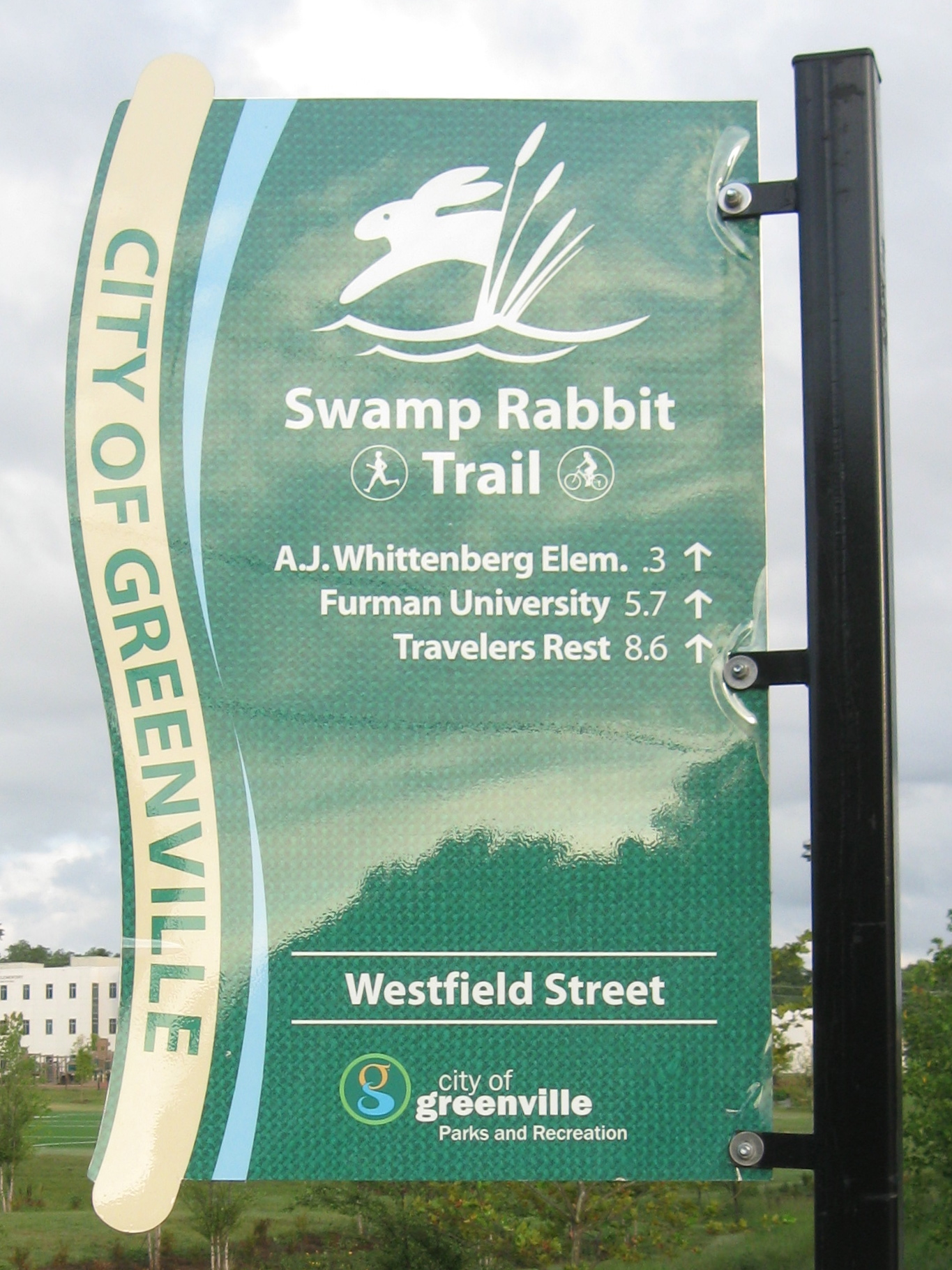
Trail marker, Swamp Rabbit Trail, Greenville, South Carolina

- Anderson
- Cherokee
  - Triple C Rail Trail
- Greenville
  - Swamp Rabbit Trail
- Oconee
  - Blue Ridge Railroad Historical
- Pickens
- Spartanburg
  - Mary Black Rail Trail

== MIDLANDS ==
- Aiken
  - Cathedral Aisle Trail
  - North Augusta Greeneway
- Chester
  - Kings Mountain Railroad Trail
- Edgefield
  - Ten Governors Rail Trail
- Greenwood
  - Heritage Trail
- York
  - Carolina & North-Western Rail Trail
  - Kings Mountain Railroad Trail a rough 22-mile (35 km) trail mostly for hikers but some mountain biking.
  - Triple C Rail Trail
  - York Bicycle Trail

== LOW COUNTRY ==
- Beaufort
  - Spanish Moss Trail
- Berkeley
  - Swamp Fox Passage (part of the Palmetto Trail)
- Charleston
  - Swamp Fox Passage (part of the Palmetto Trail)
  - West Ashley Bikeway
  - West Ashley Greenway
- Colleton
  - Edisto Nature Trail
- Florence
  - Florence Rail Trail
- Marion
  - Marion Hike and Bike Trail
