= American Hotel (Sharon Springs, New York) =

- U.S. National Register of Historic Places
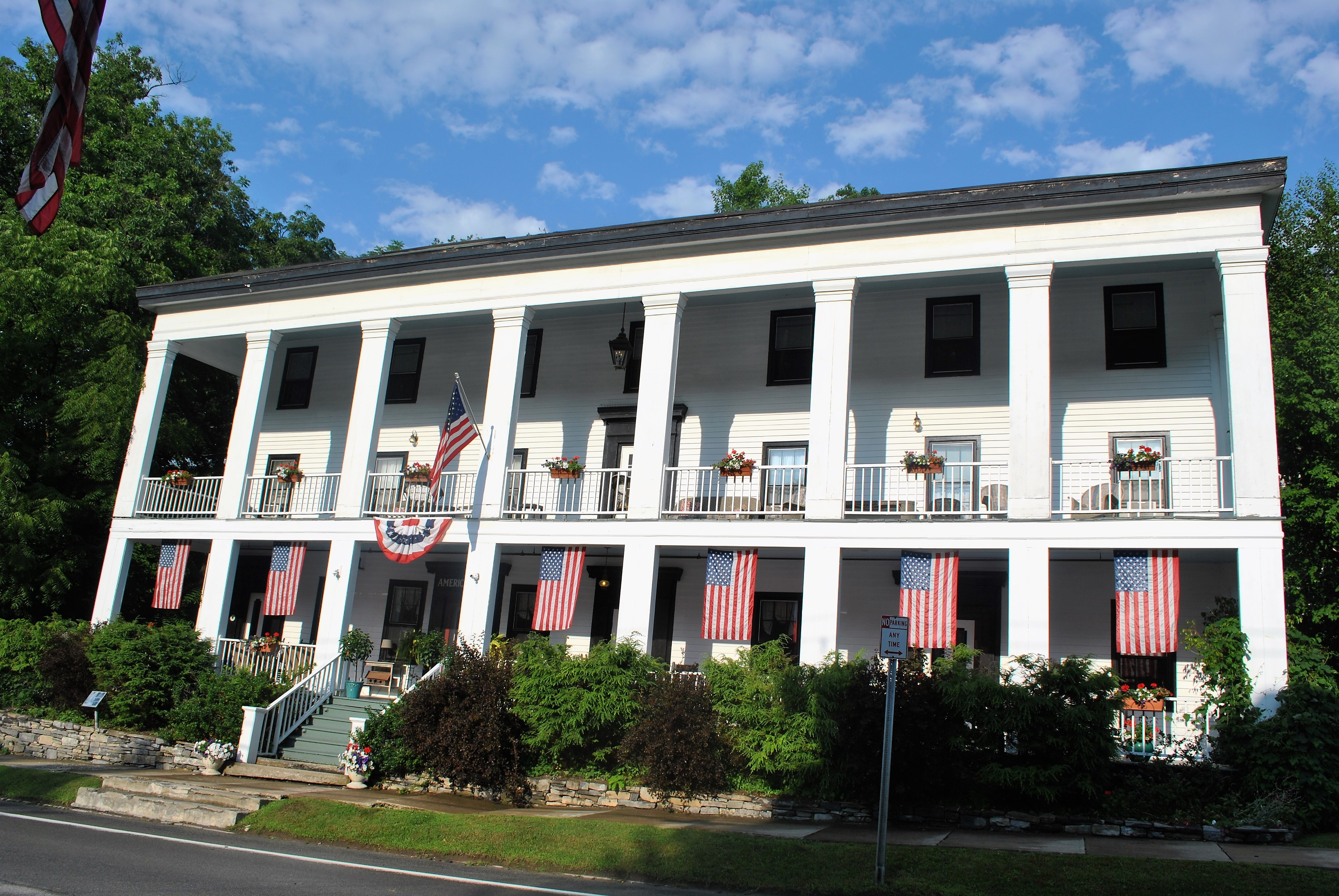
- American Hotel, July 2016

- Location within New York Location within the United States
- Location: Main St., Sharon Springs, New York
- Coordinates: 42°47′37″N 74°37′3″W
- Area: 9 acres (3.6 ha)
- Built: 1849
- Architectural style: Greek Revival
- NRHP reference No.: 75001228
- Added to NRHP: September 9, 1975

American Hotel is a historic hotel located at Sharon Springs in Schoharie County, New York. It is a large, 3 1/2-story wood-frame structure built between 1847 and 1851 in the Greek Revival style. It features a recessed 2-story porch with a colonnade of eight pillars with Doric order capitals supporting the roof. It is located within the Sharon Springs Historic District.

It was listed on the National Register of Historic Places on September 9, 1975.

The hotel and owners Doug Plummer and Garth Roberts appear in the reality television series The Fabulous Beekman Boys, which takes place in Sharon Springs. The series debuted in June 2010.

== See also ==
- History of the National Register of Historic Places
- List of heritage registers
- List of threatened historic sites in the United States
- United States National Register of Historic Places listings
- World Heritage Site
