= HaSharon =

HaSharon may refer to:

- HaSharon Junction, commonly known as Beit Lid Junction, an important road junction in the Sharon region, Israel
- HaSharon Park, an Israeli national park

== See also ==
- Havatzelet HaSharon, a moshav in central Israel
- Hod HaSharon, a city in the Central District of Israel
- Mishmar HaSharon, a kibbutz in central Israel
- Ramat HaSharon, a city located on Israel's central coastal strip
- Sharon (disambiguation)
