= Kings River =

Kings River can refer to:

== In Ireland ==
- Kings River (Ireland)

== In the United States ==
- Kings River, former name of Centerville, Fresno County, California
- Kings River (Arkansas) in Arkansas and Missouri, United States
- Kings River (California) in California, United States
- Kings River (Nevada) in Nevada, United States
- Kings River (Alaska) in Alaska, United States

== See also ==
- Kings Creek (disambiguation)
- Kings (disambiguation)
- King River (disambiguation)
