= Hill Complex Historic District =

Historic district in South Carolina, United States

- U.S. National Register of Historic Places
- U.S. Historic district
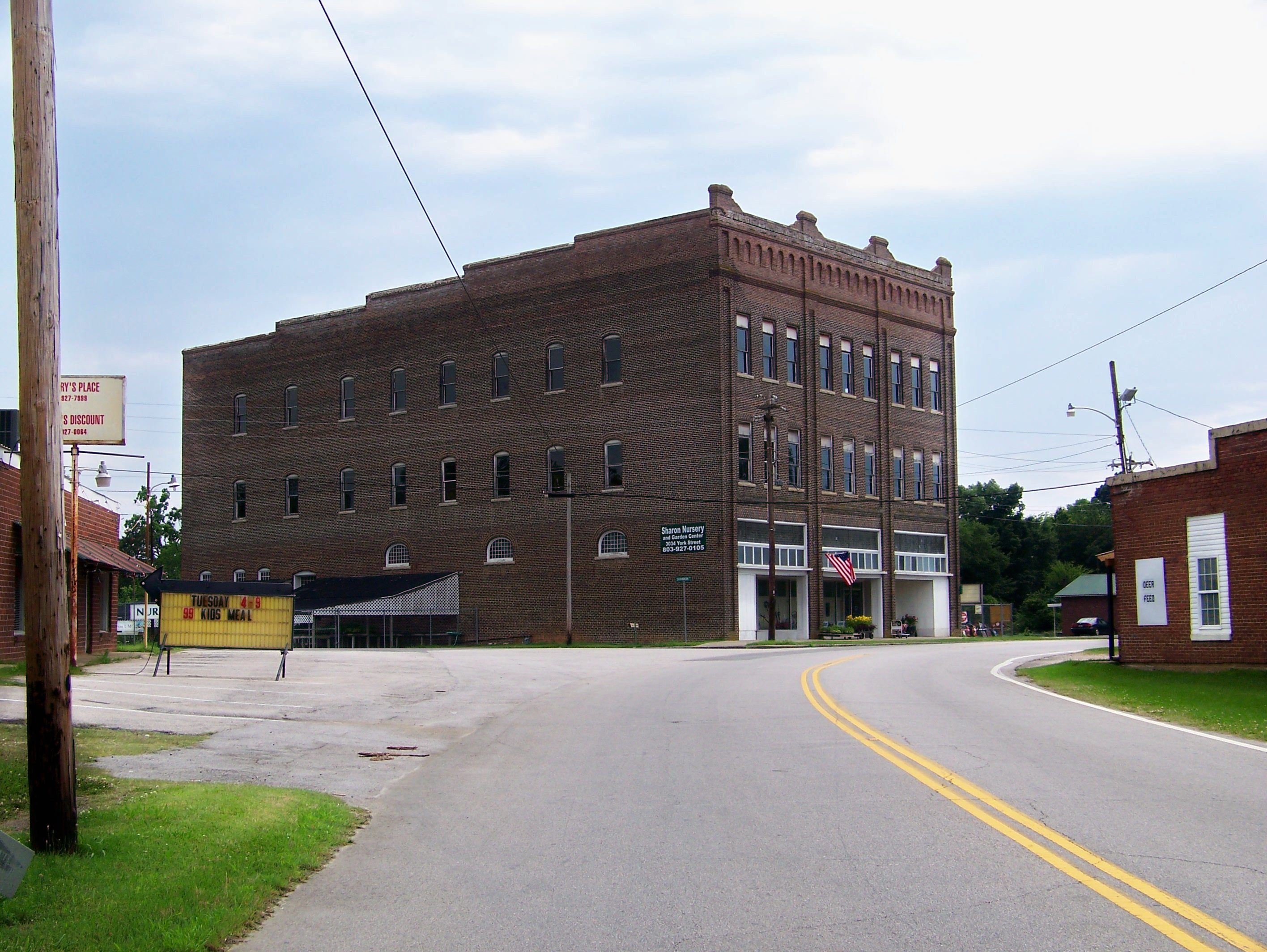

- Location within South Carolina Location within the United States
- Location: York and Shannon Sts., Sharon, South Carolina
- Coordinates: 34°57′9″N 81°20′12″W
- Area: 4.5 acres (1.8 ha)
- Architectural style: Late Victorian, Classical Revival
- NRHP reference No.: 03000273
- Added to NRHP: April 18, 2003

Hill Complex Historic District is a national historic district located at Sharon, York County, South Carolina. It encompasses four contributing buildings in Sharon. The buildings are commercial, industrial, and residential buildings built by William Lawrence Hill between about 1890 and 1925. The buildings are the William L. Hill House (c. 1890), W. L. Hill Cotton Gin (c. 1925), W. L. Hill Cotton Warehouse and Dock (c. 1920), and the separately listed W.L. Hill Store (1913).

It was added to the National Register of Historic Places in 2003.
