= Sharon (disambiguation) =

Sharon is both a given name and a surname.

Sharon may also refer to:

== Places ==
=== Australia ===
- Sharon, Queensland, a locality in the Bundaberg Region, Queensland

=== Canada ===
- Sharon, Ontario
  - Sharon Peak

=== France ===
- Sharon, Saint-Plantes

=== Israel ===
- Sharon plain
- Hod HaSharon
- Ramat HaSharon
- Hof HaSharon Regional Council
- Lev HaSharon Regional Council

=== United Kingdom ===
- Sharon, Hampshire
- Sharon, Nottinghamshire

=== United States ===
- Sharon, California
- Sharon, Connecticut, a New England town
  - Sharon (CDP), Connecticut, the main village in the town
- Sharon, Georgia
- Sharon, Indiana
- Sharon, Kansas
- Sharon, Massachusetts, a New England town
  - Sharon (CDP), Massachusetts, the central village in the town
  - Sharon (MBTA station)
- Sharon, Michigan
- Sharon, Madison County, Mississippi
- Sharon, Missouri
- Sharon, New Hampshire
- Sharon, New York
- Sharon, North Dakota
- Sharon, Ohio
- Sharon, Oklahoma
- Sharon, Pennsylvania
- Sharon, South Carolina
- Sharon, Vermont
- Sharon, West Virginia
- Sharon, Wisconsin, a village in Walworth County
- Sharon, Walworth County, Wisconsin, a town
- Sharon, Portage County, Wisconsin, a town
- New Sharon, Maine
- Sharon Center, Iowa, unincorporated community
- Sharon Springs, Kansas
- Sharon Springs, New York
- Sharon Township (disambiguation) (several places)
- Sharonville, Ohio

== Other uses ==
- The SS Sharon, a nineteenth century whaling ship whose story is detailed in In the Wake of Madness by historian Joan Druett
- The Rose of Sharon, a flower of uncertain identity mentioned in English language translations of the Bible
- Sharon fruit, a name for one type of Japanese persimmon developed in Israel
- The Sharon School, a Jewish school in Harare, Zimbabwe
- SHARON Wastewater Treatment Process
- The Sharon Statement, the founding statement of principles of the Young Americans for Freedom
- A song by David Bromberg from the album Demon in Disguise
- Sharon Esther Spitz, the main character and protagonist of the 2D animated TV show Braceface.
- Sharon (album), a 2022 album by the Cowboy Junkies

== See also ==
- HaSharon (disambiguation)
