= Jackson's Furnace Site (38YK217) =

Archaeological site in South Carolina, United States

- U.S. National Register of Historic Places
- Nearest city: Smyrna, South Carolina
- Area: 35 acres (14 ha)
- MPS: Early Ironworks of Northwestern South Carolina TR
- NRHP reference No.: 87000706
- Added to NRHP: May 8, 1987

Jackson's Furnace Site, also known as Stroup's Furnace, is a historic archaeological site located near Smyrna, York County, South Carolina. The site includes an earthen sluiceway, stone dam abutments, the stone foundation of an iron furnace and slag heaps. It is one of only two sites that can be associated with the King's Mountain Iron Company, which operated in present-day Cherokee County from about 1815 to about 1860. The other site is King's Creek Furnace Site in Cherokee County.

It was added to the National Register of Historic Places in 1987.
