= Kings Creek (Elk Creek tributary) =

River in Pennsylvania, United States

Coordinates: 41°30′47″N 76°39′48″W

Kings Creek is an 8.8-mile-long (14.2 km) tributary of Elk Creek in Sullivan County, Pennsylvania, in the United States.

Kings Creek joins Elk Creek at the community of Lincoln Falls.

== See also ==
- List of rivers of Pennsylvania
