= Tirzah, South Carolina =

Unincorporated community in South Carolina, US

Coordinates: 34°59′47″N 81°08′36″W

Tirzah is an unincorporated community in York County, South Carolina, United States. The elevation of Tirzah is 705 ft. The community is halfway between the city of York and Rock Hill.
