= King Creek (Crow River tributary) =

Stream in Meeker County, Minnesota, U.S.

Coordinates: 44°57′45″N 94°39′26″W

King Creek is a stream in Meeker County, in the U.S. state of Minnesota. It is a tributary of the Crow River.

King Creek was named for William S. King, a cattleman.

== See also ==
- List of rivers of Minnesota
