= Sharon Downtown Historic District =

Historic district in South Carolina, United States

- U.S. National Register of Historic Places
- U.S. Historic district
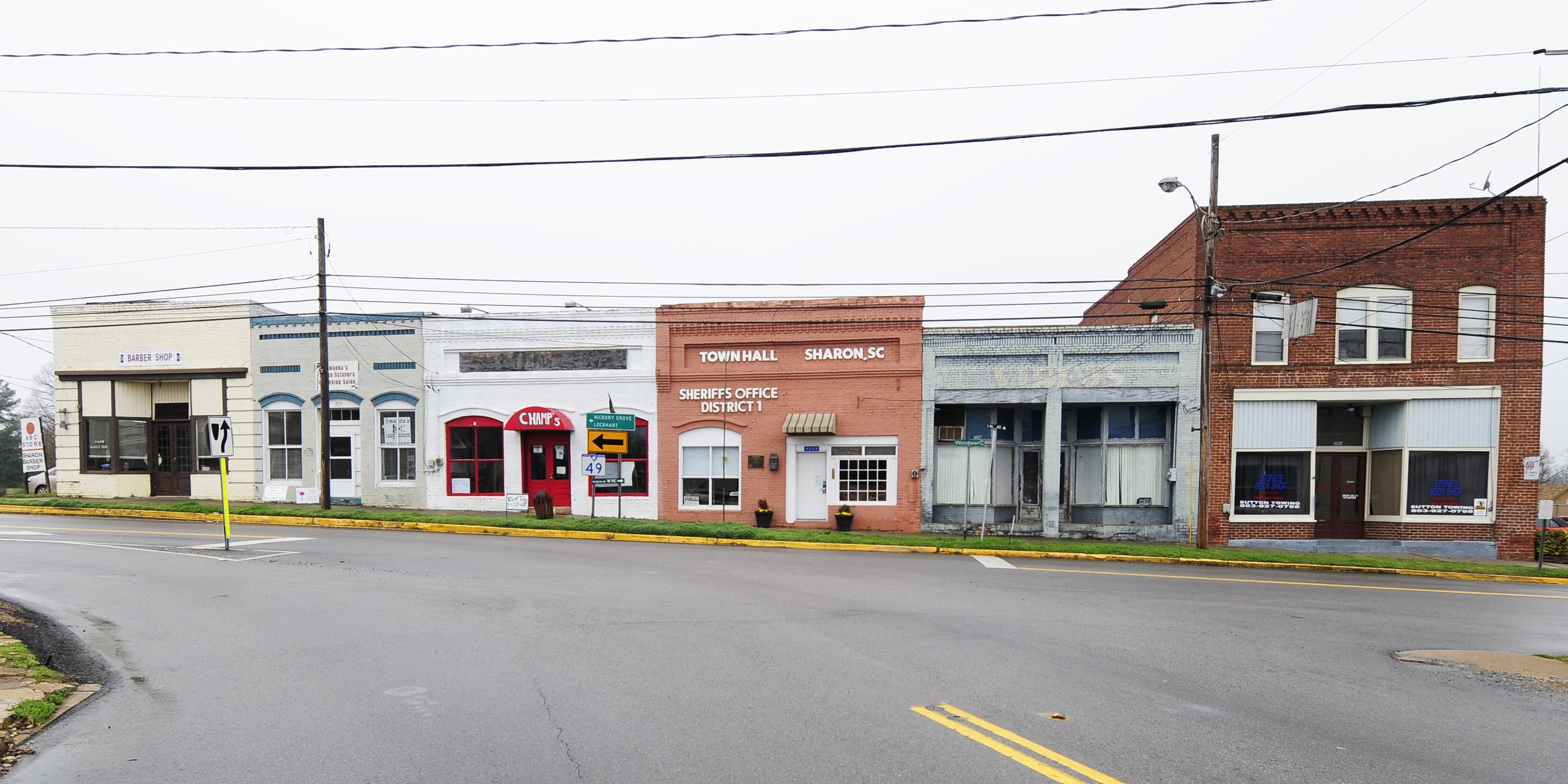
- Sharon Downtown Historic District, March 2012

- Location within South Carolina Location within the United States
- Location: York St. and Woodlawn Ave., Sharon, South Carolina
- Coordinates: 34°57′6″N 81°20′30″W
- Area: 3 acres (1.2 ha)
- Architectural style: Late Victorian, Late 19th And 20th Century Revivals
- NRHP reference No.: 01001202
- Added to NRHP: November 2, 2001

Sharon Downtown Historic District is a national historic district located at Sharon, York County, South Carolina. It encompasses nine contributing buildings in the central business district of Sharon. The buildings are predominantly masonry commercial buildings built between 1908 and 1944. The buildings are the First National Bank of Sharon, Shannon and Plexico Buildings, Love and Kennedy Buildings, Hope Building and Sims Hood Drugstore, and John S. Rainey Cotton Gin, Seedhouse and Office.

It was added to the National Register of Historic Places in 2001.
