= Kings Creek, South Carolina =

Unincorporated community in South Carolina, US

Coordinates: 35°04′26″N 81°26′12″W

Kings Creek (or King's Creek) is an unincorporated community in Cherokee County, South Carolina, United States. It is located in the vicinity of South Carolina Highways 5 and 97. Situated nearby is the NRHP-designated King's Creek Furnace Site. The name of the community comes from a local settler named King who lived close to the locale on the namesake Kings Creek.

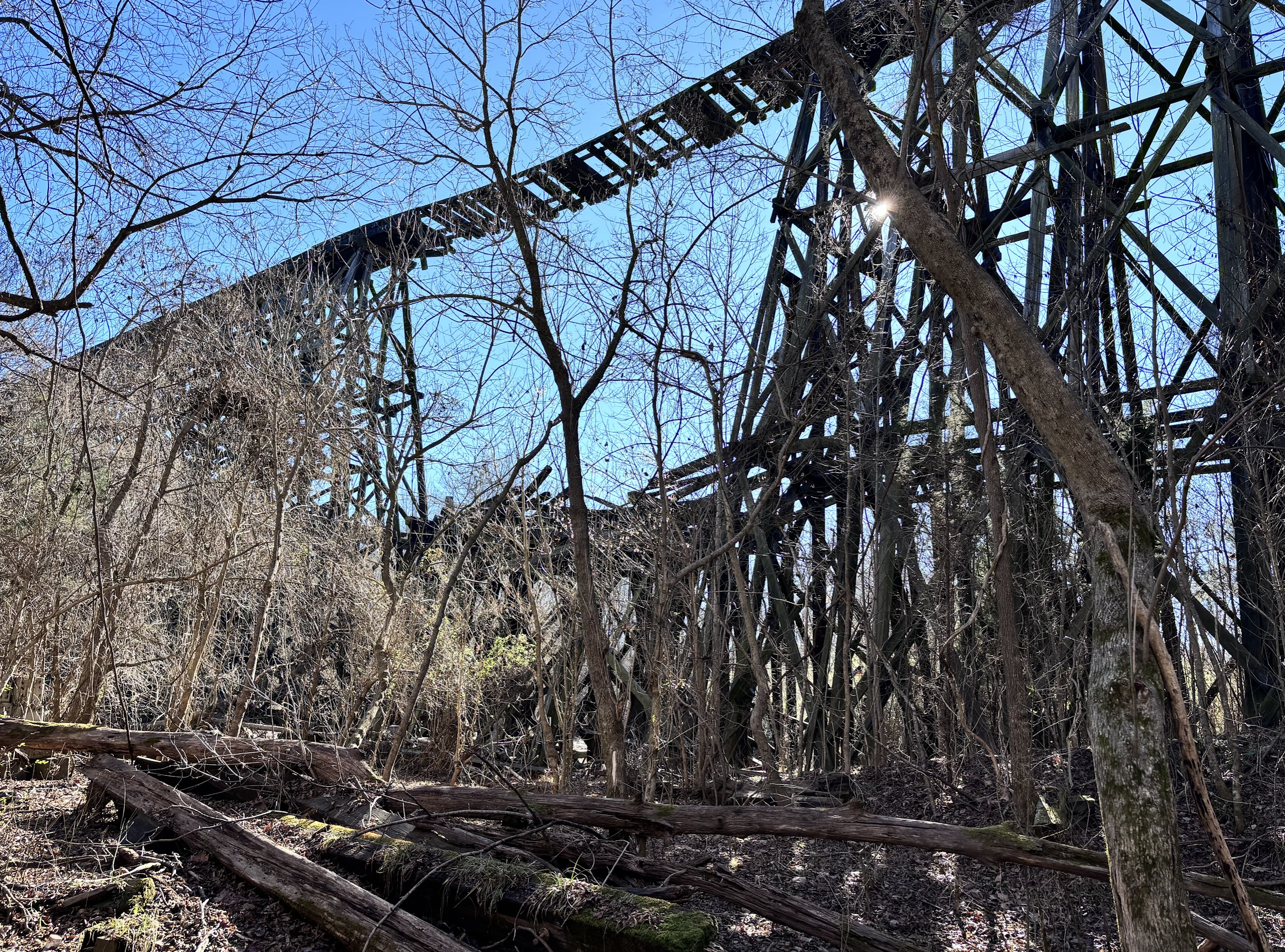
An abandoned trestle over Kings Creek

The settlement has a history of mining operations and represents the former Kings Creek Mining District, which held deposits of iron and copper sulfides. South of Kings Creek sits a historic gold mine bearing the locality's name. Railways have also seen historic prominence in the area, and the hamlet exists as the western terminus of the Triple C Rail Trail. Near Kings Creek remains a railroad line formerly operated by the Carolina Coastal Railway.
