= Kingscreek, Ohio =

Unincorporated community in Ohio, U.S.

Coordinates: 40°09′40″N 83°43′30″W

Kingscreek is an unincorporated community in Champaign County, in the U.S. state of Ohio.

== History ==
Kingscreek was originally called Kingston, and under the latter name was platted around 1870. The present name is derived from nearby Kings Creek. A post office called Kings Creek was established in 1868, and remained in operation until 1909.
