= Sharon Springs Historic District =

Historic district in New York, United States

- U.S. National Register of Historic Places
- U.S. Historic district
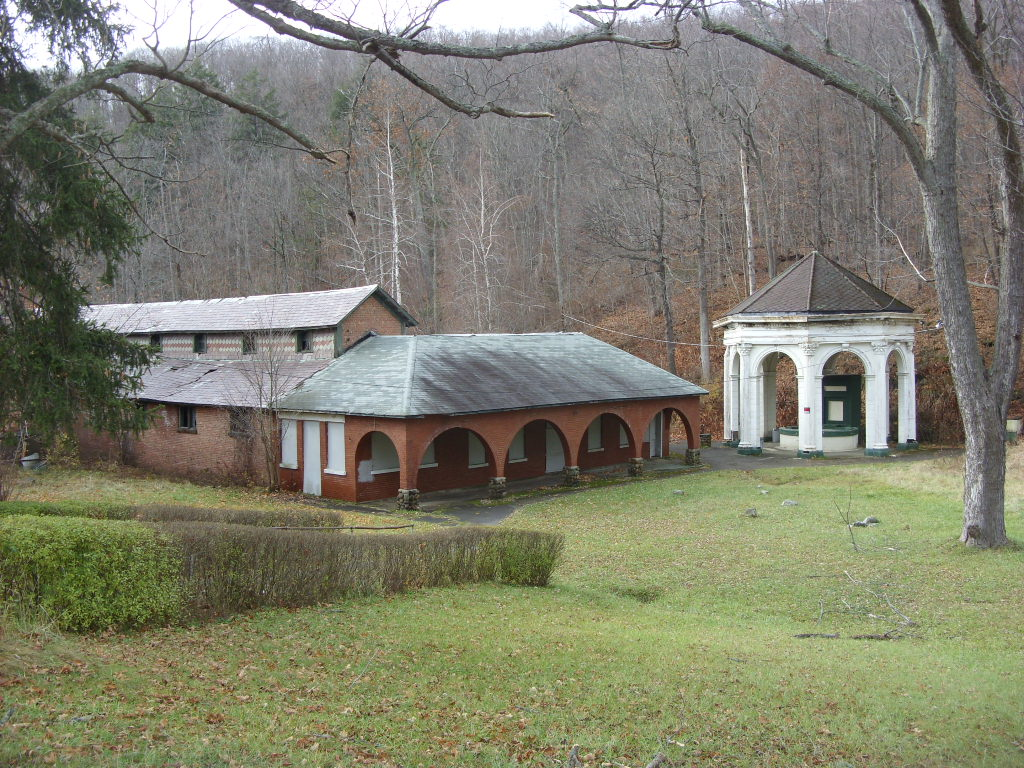
- Lower Bath House and White Sulphur Temple, November 2008

- Location within New York Location within the United States
- Location: Jct. of NY 10 and US 20, Sharon Springs, New York
- Coordinates: 42°47′32″N 74°36′56″W
- Area: 374 acres (151 ha)
- Architectural style: Greek Revival, Italianate, Queen Anne
- NRHP reference No.: 94000541
- Added to NRHP: June 3, 1994

Sharon Springs Historic District is a national historic district located at Sharon Springs in Schoharie County, New York. The district includes 167 contributing buildings and nine contributing structures. It encompasses all of what remains of the historic mineral water spa, including commercial, institutional, and residential properties associated with its resort function during the period, ca. 1825–1941. The focus of the district is a group of mineral springs that together constitute the world-famous spa for which the village was named. Notable buildings include the Magnesia Temple (1863), Chalybeate Temple (1920s), Lower Bath House (ca. 1876), Inhalation Bath House (ca. 1884), Imperial Bath House (1927), Adler Hotel (1928), and Roseboro Hotel (ca. 1905). Also located in the district is the separately listed American Hotel.

It was added to the National Register of Historic Places in 1994.

== Gallery ==
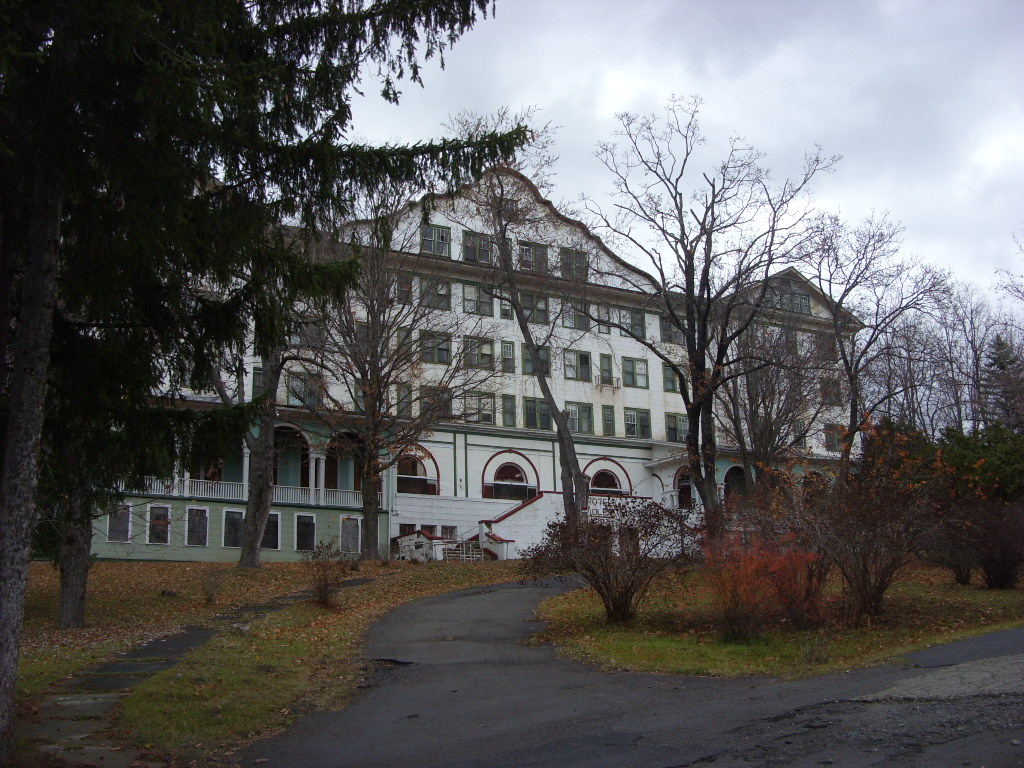
Adler Hotel, November 2008

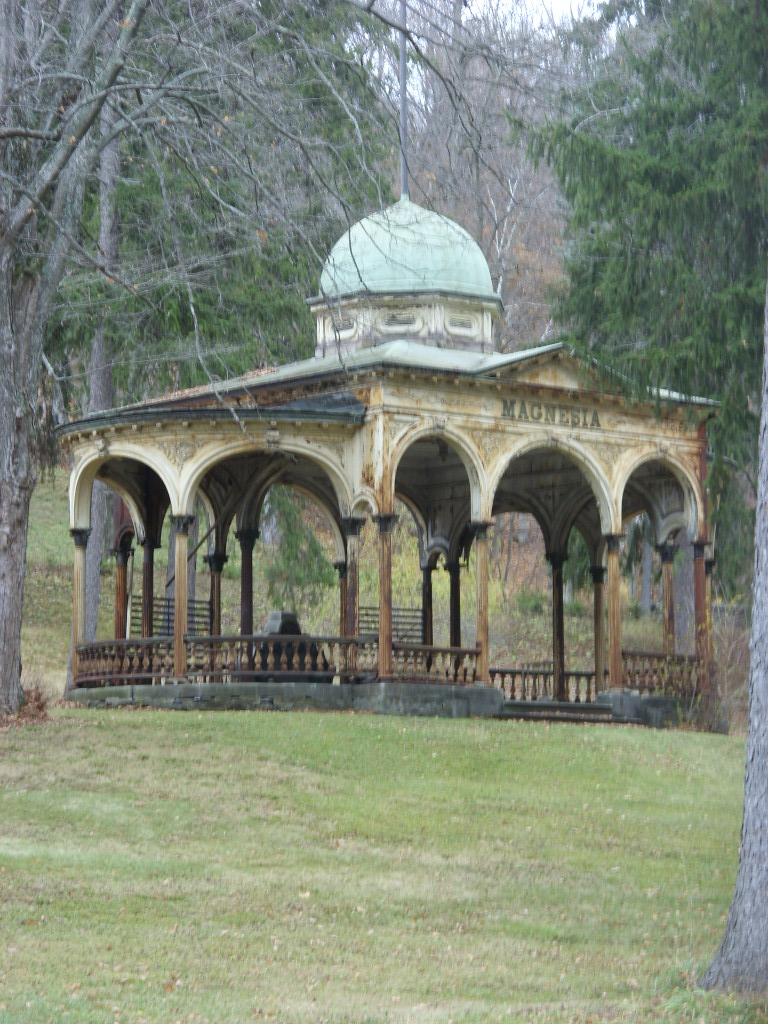
Magnesia Temple, November 2008

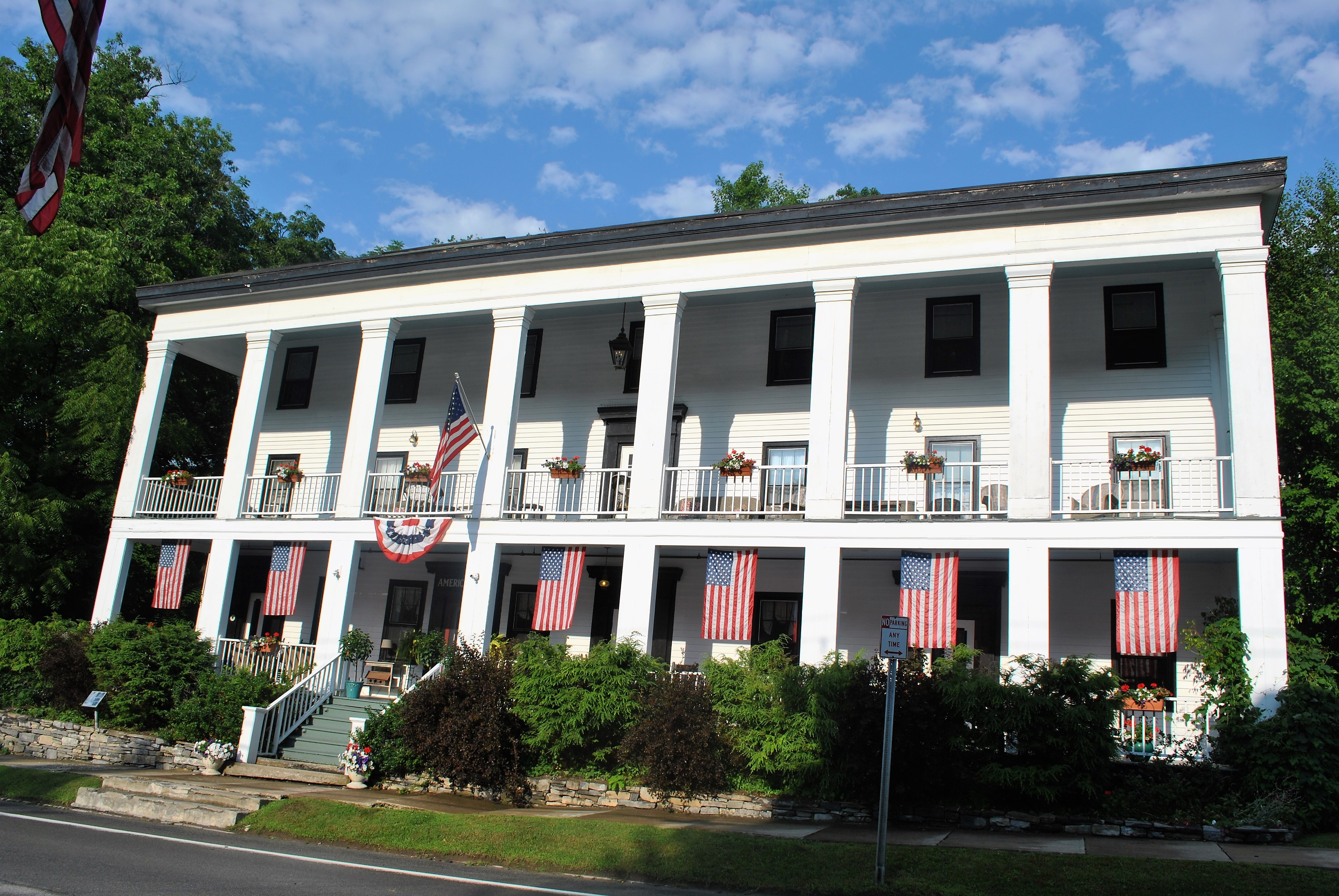
American Hotel

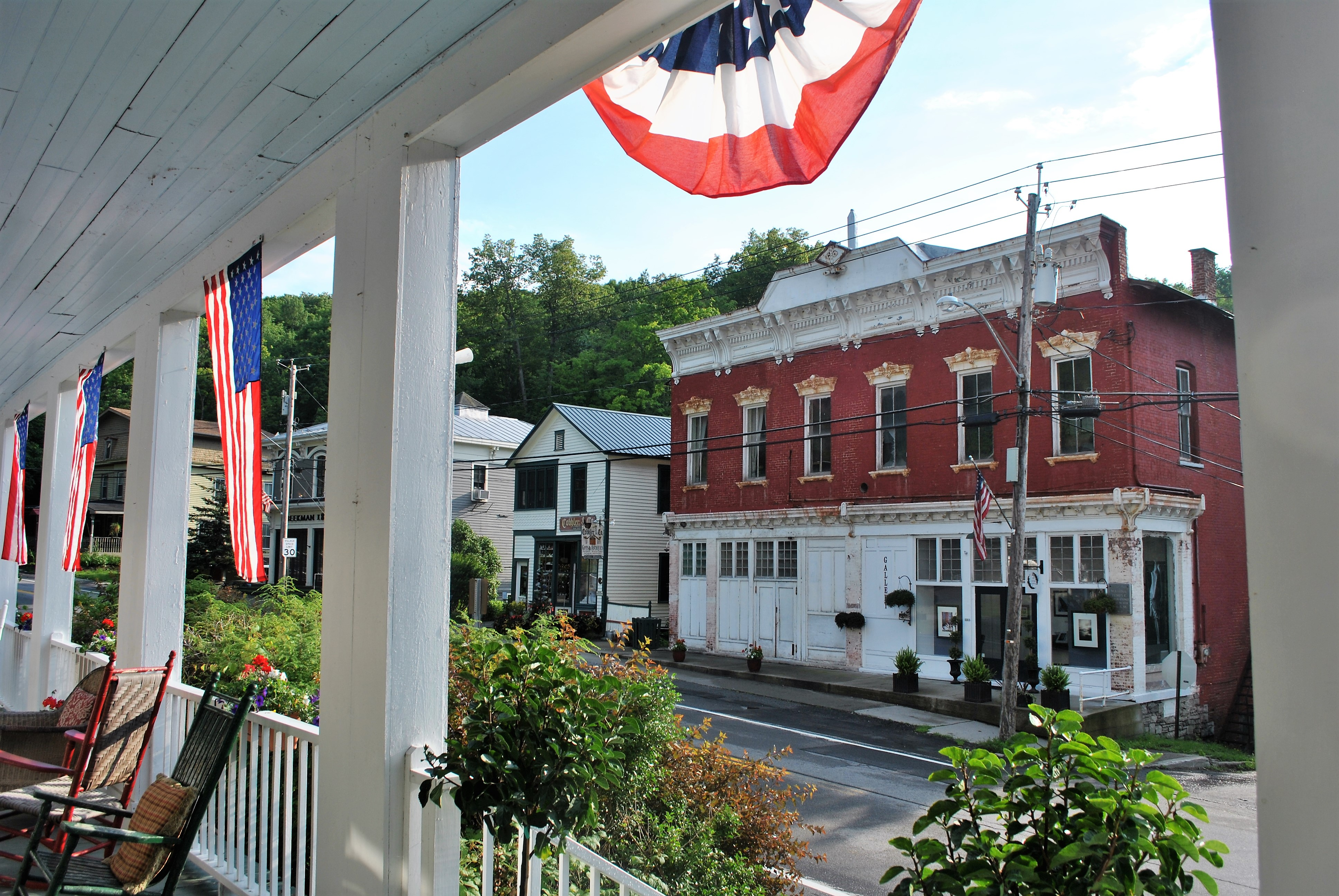
Klinkhart Building

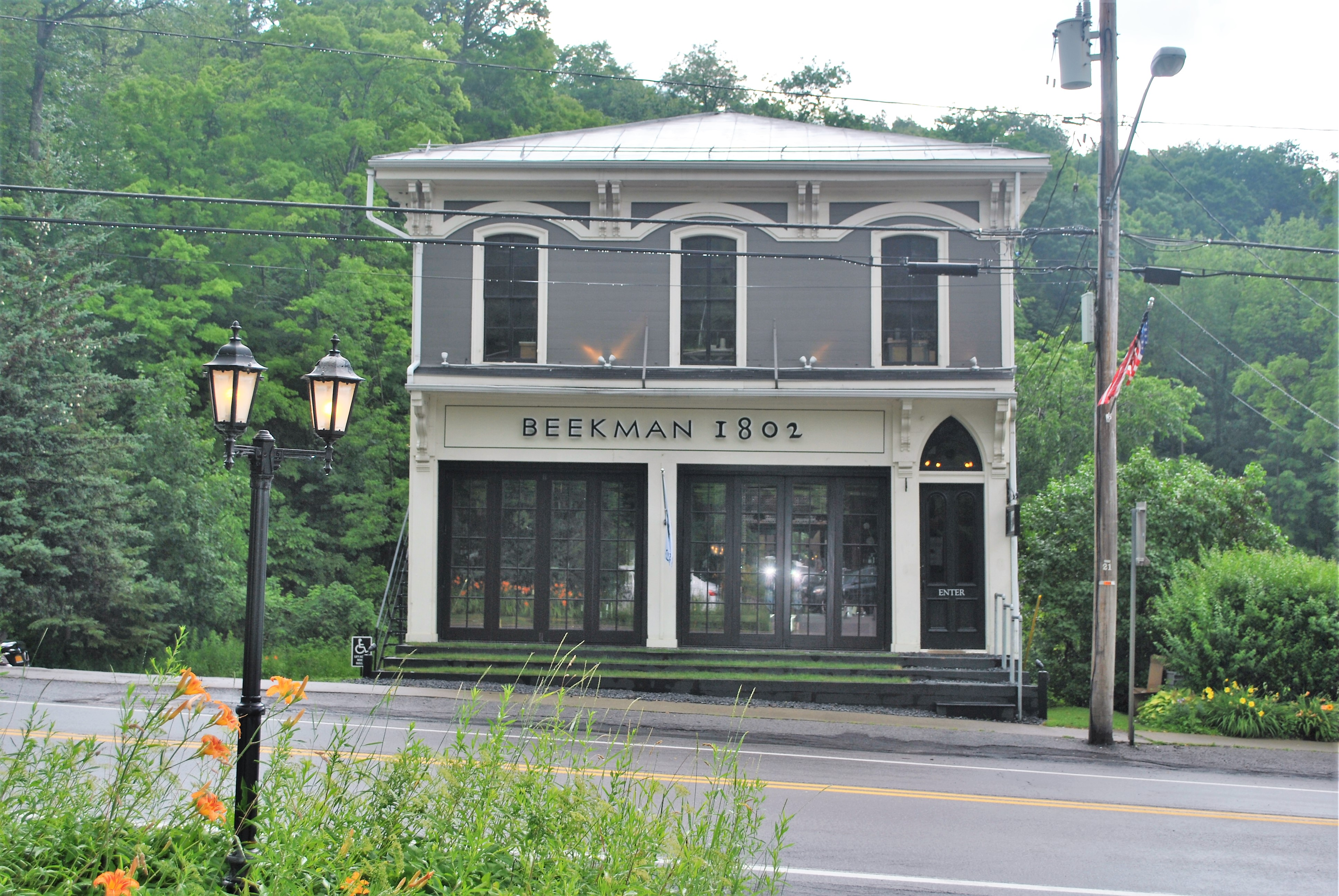
Beekman 1802 Mercantile

== See also ==
- National Register of Historic Places listings in Schoharie County, New York
