= Kings Creek Falls =

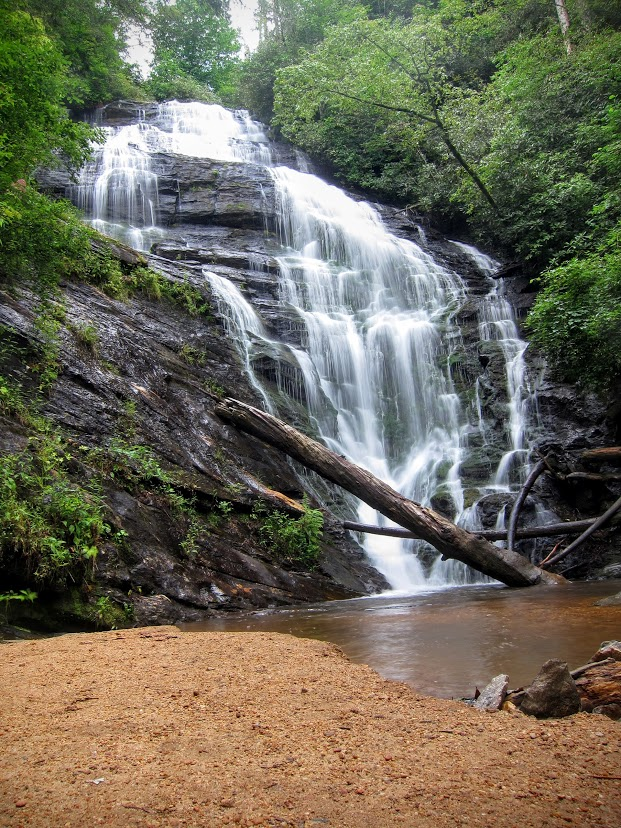
- Interactive map of Kings Creek Falls
- Location: Long Creek, South Carolina
- Coordinates: 34°57′58″N 83°06′41″W
- Elevation: 2,280 feet (695 m)
- Total height: ~65 feet (20 m)

Kings Creek Falls, located near Long Creek, South Carolina, is a waterfall in the Oconee District of the Sumter National Forest. Kings Creek is a tributary of the Chatooga River, and the falls are located off a short spur from the Foothills Trail. It is located in the extreme Northwest of the state, near the Ellicott Rock Wilderness Area and the Georgia state line.

== See also ==
- List of waterfalls
