= King's Creek Furnace Site (38CK71) =

United States historic place

- U.S. National Register of Historic Places
- Nearest city: Kings Creek, South Carolina
- Area: 3.7 acres (1.5 ha)
- Built: 1838
- MPS: Early Ironworks of Northwestern South Carolina TR
- NRHP reference No.: 87000707
- Added to NRHP: May 8, 1987

King's Creek Furnace Site (38CK71) is a historic archaeological site located near Kings Creek, Cherokee County, South Carolina, United States. The site contains a partially collapsed but well-preserved iron furnace built about 1838, retaining walls, sluiceway, stone dam abutments, stone building foundations, large piles of slag, and a large slag levee along the creek bank. It also includes the remains of the site's log framed dam. King's Creek Furnace Site is one of two remaining sites that can be associated with the King's Mountain Iron Company, a major iron manufacturing company that operated in present-day Cherokee County from about 1815 to about 1860. The other site is Jackson's Furnace Site in York County.

It was listed in the National Register of Historic Places in 1987.
