= Sharon Township =

Sharon Township may refer to:

== Illinois ==
- Sharon Township, Fayette County, Illinois

== Iowa ==
- Sharon Township, Appanoose County, Iowa
- Sharon Township, Audubon County, Iowa
- Sharon Township, Clinton County, Iowa
- Sharon Township, Johnson County, Iowa

== Kansas ==
- Sharon Township, Barber County, Kansas

== Michigan ==
- Sharon Township, Michigan

== Minnesota ==
- Sharon Township, Le Sueur County, Minnesota

== Nebraska ==
- Sharon Township, Buffalo County, Nebraska

== North Dakota ==
- Sharon Township, Steele County, North Dakota

== Ohio ==
- Sharon Township, Franklin County, Ohio
- Sharon Township, Medina County, Ohio
- Sharon Township, Noble County, Ohio
- Sharon Township, Richland County, Ohio

== Pennsylvania ==
- Sharon Township, Pennsylvania

== South Dakota ==
- Sharon Township, Hutchinson County, South Dakota

== See also ==
- Sharon (disambiguation)
