= King River =

King River may refer to:

Communities

- King River, the former name of Centerville, Fresno County, California, United States
- King River, Western Australia, a town in Western Australia

Watercourse

- King River (Northern Territory), a river in the Northern Territory, Australia
- King River (Queensland), a river in Queensland, Australia
- King River (Tasmania), a river in Tasmania, Australia
- King River (Victoria), a river in Victoria, Australia
- King River (Kimberley region, Western Australia), a river in the Kimberley region of Western Australia
- King River (Western Australia), a river in Western Australia

== See also ==
- Kings River (disambiguation)
- King (disambiguation)
- King Lake (disambiguation)
