= W.L. Hill Store =

- U.S. National Register of Historic Places
- U.S. Historic district – Contributing property
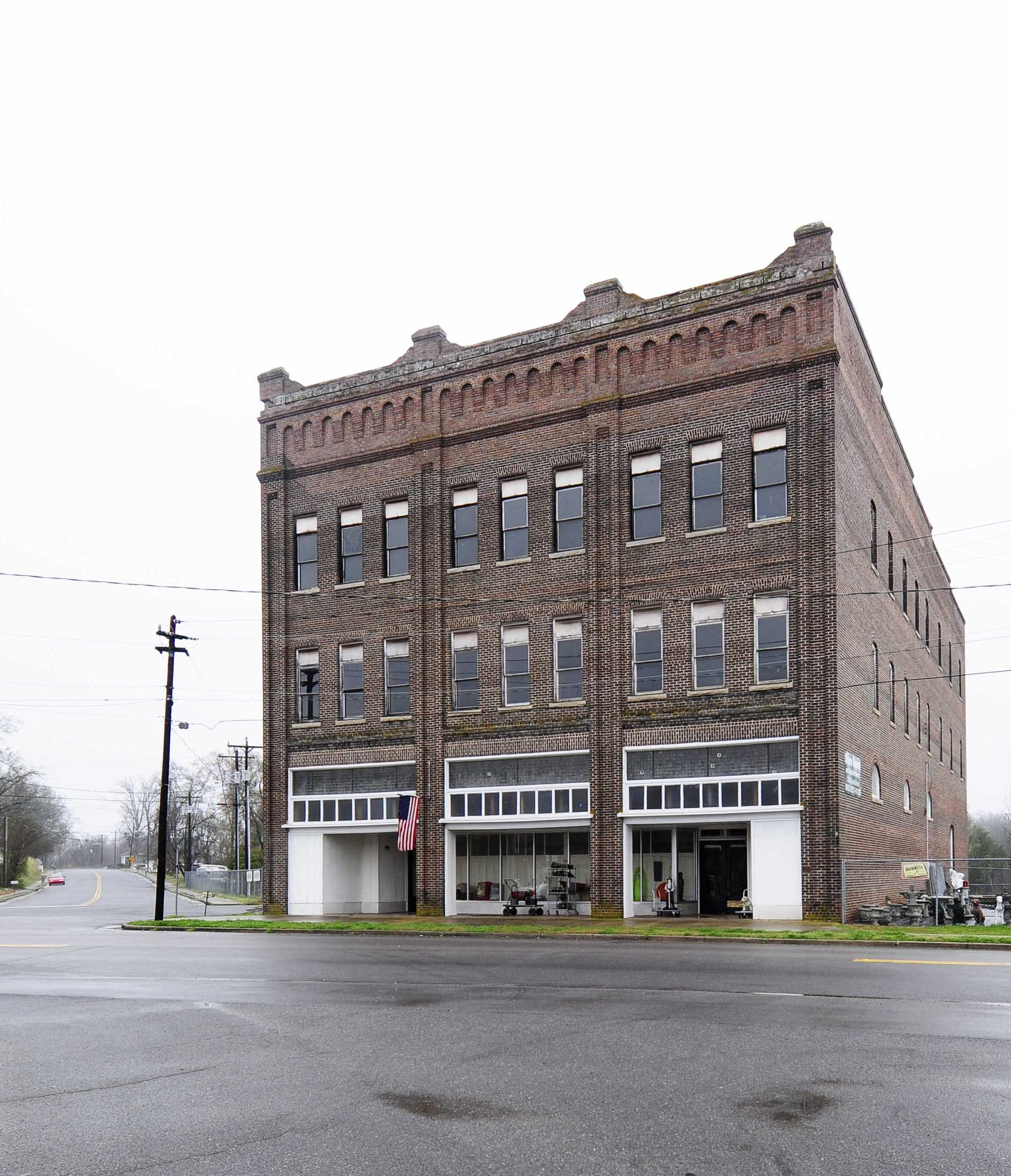
- W.L. Hill Store in downtown Sharon

- Location within South Carolina Location within the United States
- Location: Sharon, South Carolina
- Coordinates: 34°57′06″N 81°20′17″W
- Built: 1913
- Architect: Julian Starr
- Architectural style: Commercial Style
- NRHP reference No.: 94001572
- Added to NRHP: 20 January 1995

The W.L. Hill Store, built in 1913, is an historic three story department store located on York Street in the town of Sharon, York County, South Carolina. It is by far the largest building in town. Designed in the commercial style, by locally prominent architect Julian Starr, its size and grandeur was meant to mimic larger stores in major cities. On January 20, 1995, it was added to the National Register of Historic Places. It is located in the Hill Complex Historic District.

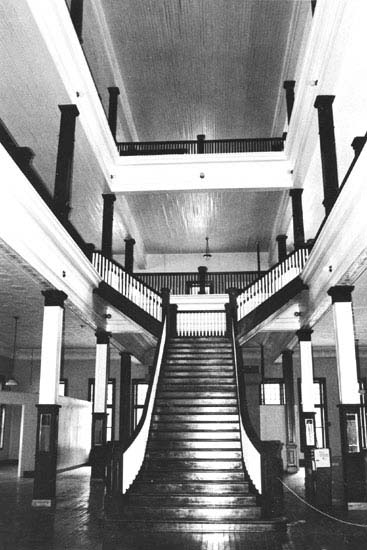
The interior is notable for its solid oak floors and the grand cherry staircase which dominates the center of the first floor.

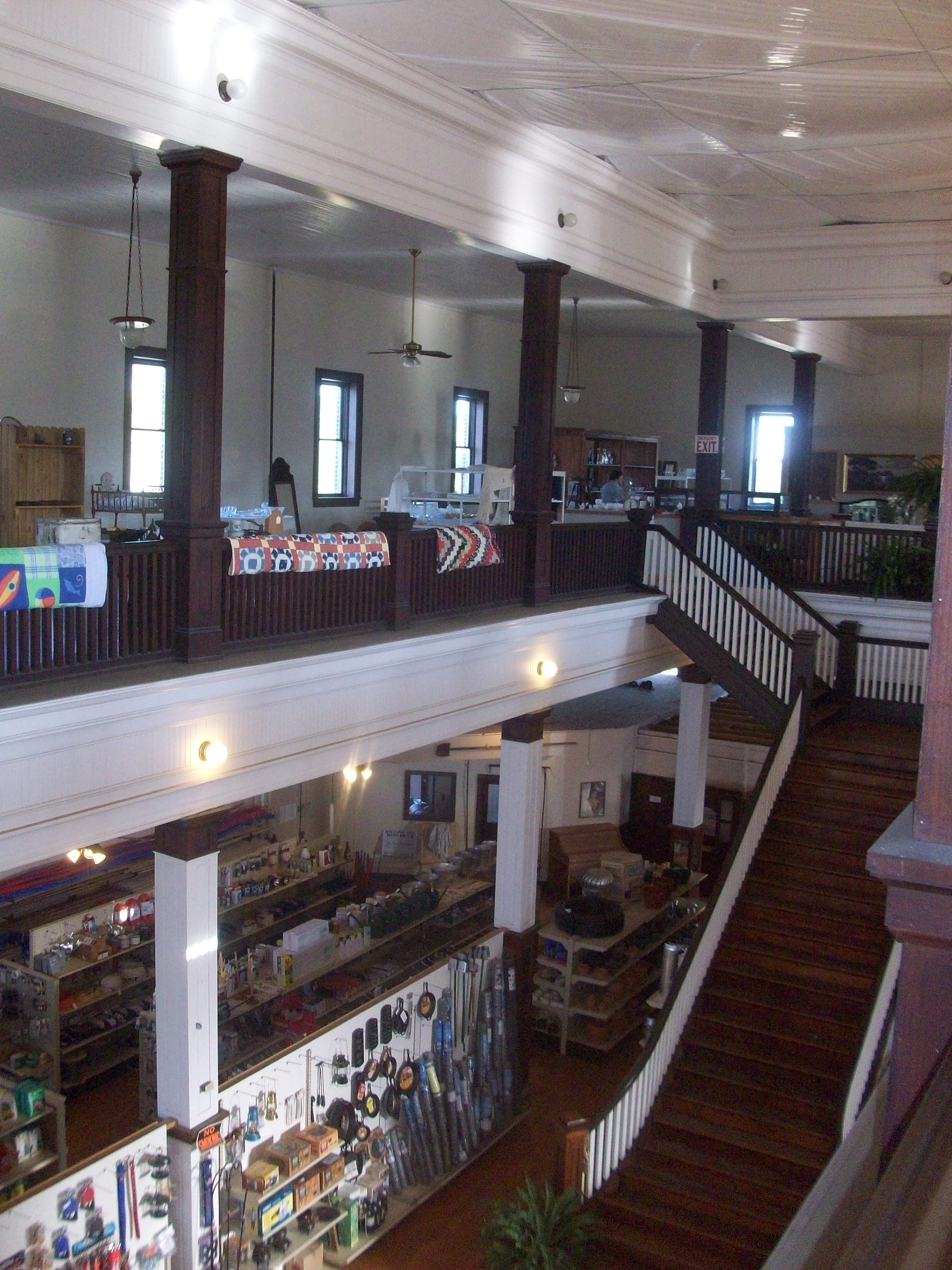
Interior of the W.L. Hill Store building in Sharon, SC at the 100 year anniversary party.

== See also ==
- National Register of Historic Places listings in York County, South Carolina
