= South Carolina Department of Natural Resources =

State agency regulating hunting and fishing

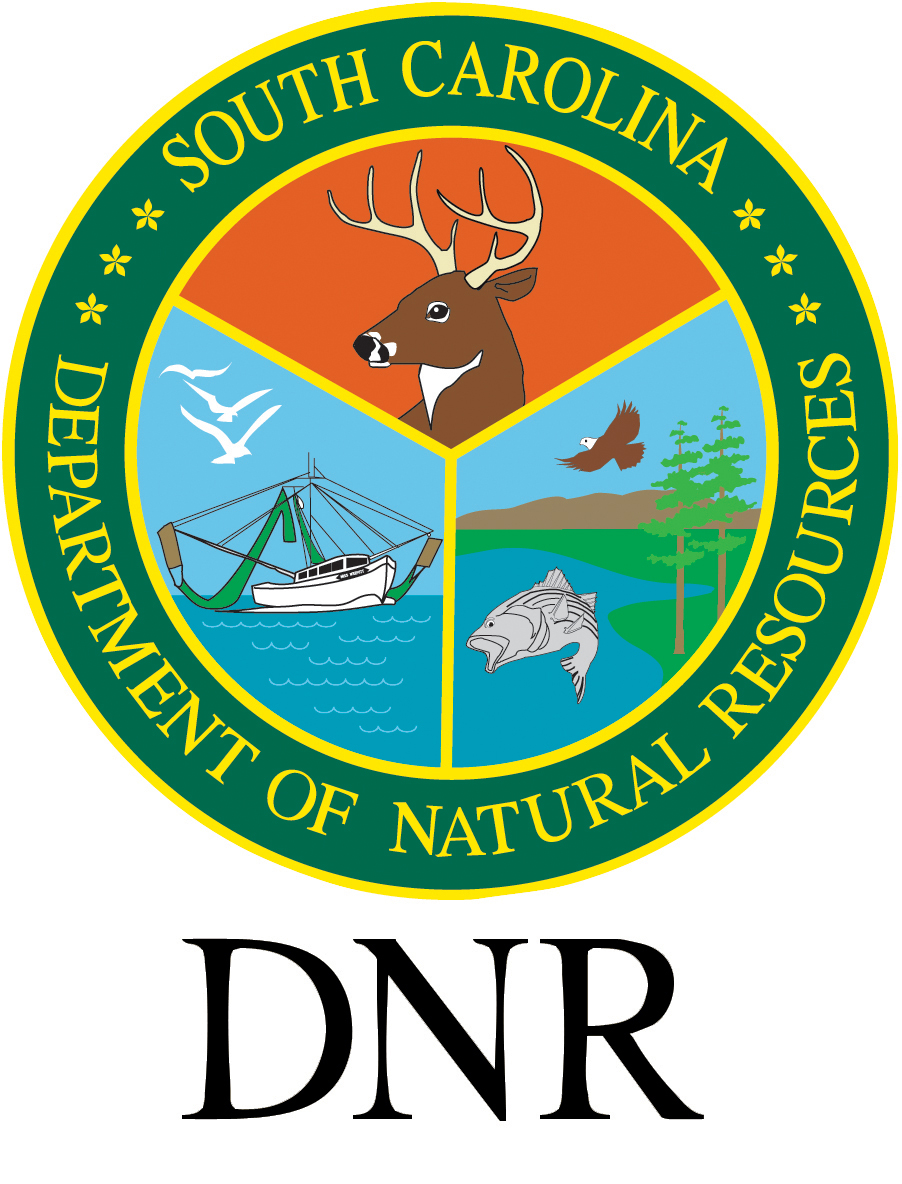
- Seal of the South Carolina Department of Natural Resources

State agency overview
- Formed: July 1, 1994; 32 years ago
- Preceding agencies: Wildlife and Marine Resources Department; Water Resources Commission; Land Resources Commission; State Geological Survey; S.C. Migratory Waterfowl Committee
- Jurisdiction: South Carolina
- Headquarters: 260 D Epting Lane, West Columbia, South Carolina
- State agency executive: Thomas S. Mullikin, Director
- Website: www.dnr.sc.gov

The South Carolina Department of Natural Resources (DNR) is a South Carolina state agency charged with regulating hunting, fishing, boating, duck stamp orders, and the conservation efforts of the state government.

It is directed by seven-member Board of Directors. The governor of South Carolina appoints a member from each of the state's congressional districts, in addition to one at-large board member. The board or governor may appoint citizens advisory panels to provide recommendations on agency programs.

The Department of Natural Resources also oversees the state's soil and water conservation districts, which are special-purpose districts contiguous with each of South Carolina's 46 counties. Each conservation district is managed by six-member boards. Three members of each board are appointed through the Department of Natural Resources, while the other half are directly elected.

== DNR senior staff ==
- Director - Thomas S. Mullikin
- Chief of Staff - Shannon F. Bobertz
  - Assistant Chief of Staff - Kevin Ryan
- DNR Divisions:
  - Tyler Brown, Deputy Director (Land, Water and Conservation Division)
  - COL Chisolm Frampton, Deputy Director (Law Enforcement Division)
  - Blaik Keppler, Deputy Director (Marine Resources Division)
  - James Dillman, Deputy Director (Wildlife and Freshwater Fisheries Division)

== DNR board members ==
- Dr. Mark F. Hartley, Chairman (1st congressional district)
- Duane Swygert, Vice Chairman (6th congressional district)
- Michael E. Hutchins (2nd congressional district)
- Davy Hite (3rd congressional district)
- Hope Blackley (4th congressional district)
- James Carlisle Oxner III (5th congressional district)
- Jerry Allen Lee (7th congressional district)

== Law enforcement ==
The Division of Law Enforcement is responsible for enforcement of state and federal laws that govern hunting, recreational and commercial fishing, recreational boating, and other natural resources conservation concerns. The division conducts South Carolina’s hunter and boater education courses, as well as other outreach programs including the Take One Make One and Archery in the Schools programs aimed at introducing youth to the sport of hunting. The division is responsible for investigating boating and hunting accidents, and DNR officers regularly conduct search and rescue missions in outlying areas and assist other law enforcement agencies in investigations. The Division has officers trained in underwater diving that assist in law enforcement, search and rescue, and evidence recovery missions. The Division also utilizes aircraft for law enforcement patrol, search and rescue, and other department missions. The division and its officers are called upon to provide homeland security related to water borne activities including commercial ship escorts, and hydroelectric dam, nuclear facility, and energy plant security.

South Carolina's corps of natural resources enforcement officers is organized into four regions covering groups of the state's 46 counties and coastal marine shoreline and waters out to 200 miles. A 24-hour toll-free number is maintained for emergencies requiring immediate law enforcement assistance from a natural resources officer. Any person may call this number anonymously to report a conservation law violation or information that could lead to the arrest of a violator and become eligible for a cash reward through the Operation Game Thief Program.

== History and purpose ==
=== The department ===
The agency as organized on July 1, 1994, under the S.C. Restructuring Act is composed of the former Wildlife and Marine Resources Department, Water Resources Commission (non-regulatory programs), Land Resources Commission (non-regulatory programs), State Geological Survey (State Geologist), and S.C. Migratory Waterfowl Committee. These have been combined into the present division structure. Thomas S. Mullikin is the current director of the agency.

=== The board ===
The SCDNR is governed by the seven-member S.C. Natural Resources Board, with one member representing each of the state's six Congressional Districts and one at large. The board meets monthly. Citizen advisory committees meet periodically.

The public is invited to attend all meetings, and comment is encouraged. Upcoming meetings are announced through news releases, local newspapers, or the DNR News and Video Section. Also, SCDNR Board Meeting minutes are available as they are approved by the Board.

== See also ==
- List of state and territorial fish and wildlife management agencies in the United States
- List of law enforcement agencies in South Carolina
