= Kings Creek (Ohio) =

Coordinates: 40°9′24″N 83°47′12″W

Kings Creek is a stream located entirely within Champaign County, Ohio. The 9-mile (14 km) long stream is a tributary of the Mad River.

Kings Creek is said to have received its name on account of an Indian chief being killed near its banks.

== See also ==
- List of rivers of Ohio
