= Smyrna, South Carolina =

- Town
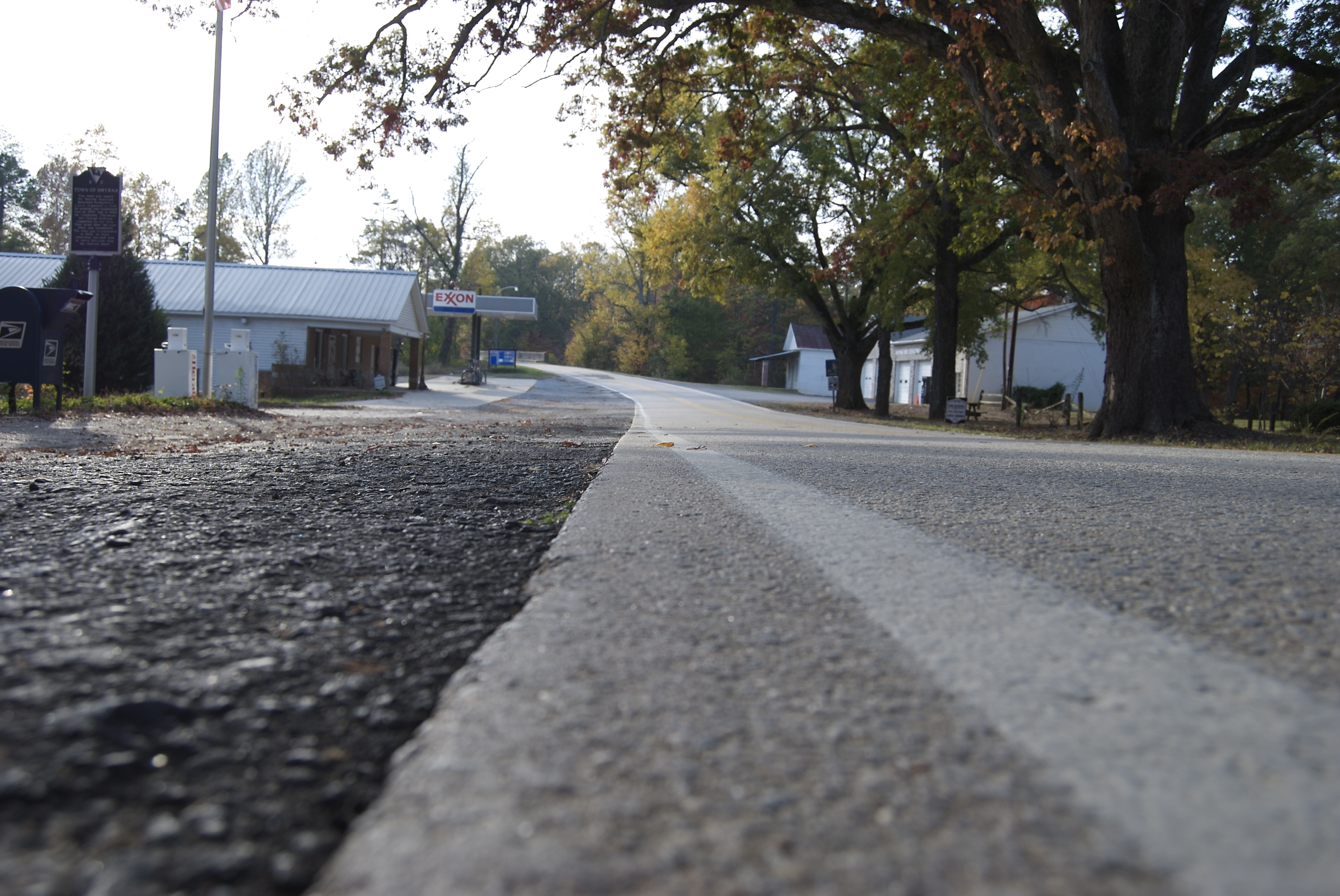
- Looking west along the shoulder of East Main Street (SC 97) in Smyrna

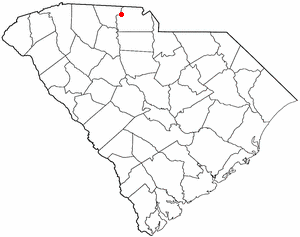
- Location of Smyrna, South Carolina
- Coordinates: 35°02′31″N 81°24′34″W
- Country: United States
- State: South Carolina
- Counties: York, Cherokee

Area
  - Total: 0.71 sq mi (1.83 km^{2})
  - Land: 0.71 sq mi (1.83 km^{2})
  - Water: 0 sq mi (0.00 km^{2})
- Elevation: 748 ft (228 m)

Population (2020)
  - Total: 55
  - Density: 77.9/sq mi (30.08/km^{2})
- Time zone: UTC-5 (Eastern (EST))
  - Summer (DST): UTC-4 (EDT)
- ZIP code: 29743
- Area codes: 803, 839
- FIPS code: 45-67210
- GNIS feature ID: 2407357

Smyrna is a small town in York and Cherokee counties in the U.S. state of South Carolina. As of the 2020 census, Smyrna had a population of 55.

== History ==
Incorporated in 1895, the town of Smyrna took its name from the Smyrna Associate Reformed Presbyterian Church that had been providing a place of worship to the local residents for fifty years. A railroad depot was built in 1888 by the Charleston, Cincinnati and Chicago Railroad, a forerunner to the Southern Railway, and then F.D. Horn built a mercantile business nearby.

The Jackson's Furnace Site (38YK217) was listed on the National Register of Historic Places in 1987.

== Geography ==
Smyrna is located in western York County and a small portion extends northwest into Cherokee County.

According to the United States Census Bureau, the town has a total area of 0.69 square miles (1.8 km^{2}), all land.

== Demographics ==
Historical population
| Census | Pop. | Note | %± |
|---|---|---|---|
| 1900 | 48 | | — |
| 1910 | 109 | | 127.1% |
| 1920 | 101 | | −7.3% |
| 1930 | 117 | | 15.8% |
| 1940 | 133 | | 13.7% |
| 1950 | 105 | | −21.1% |
| 1960 | 52 | | −50.5% |
| 1970 | 85 | | 63.5% |
| 1980 | 47 | | −44.7% |
| 1990 | 57 | | 21.3% |
| 2000 | 59 | | 3.5% |
| 2010 | 45 | | −23.7% |
| 2020 | 55 | | 22.2% |
U.S. Decennial Census

As of the census of 2010, there were 45 people, 22 households, and 14 families living in the city. The population density was 67.2 per square mile. There were 29 housing units at an average density of 43.3 per square mile. The racial makeup of the city was 100.0% White, 0.0% African American, 0.0% Native American, 0.0% Asian, 0.0% from other races, and 0.0% from two or more races. Hispanic or Latino of any race were 0.0% of the population.

There were 22 households, of which 18.2% had children under the age of 18 living with them, 40.9% were married couples living together, 9.1% had a female householder with no husband present, 13.6% had a male householder with no wife present, and 36.4% were non-families. 31.8% of all households were made up of individuals, and 31.8% had someone living alone who was 65 years of age or older. The average household size was 2.05 and the average family size was 2.50.

The median age in the city was 48.5 years. 13.3% of residents were under the age of 18; 11.1% were between the ages of 18 and 24; 20.0% were from 25 to 44; 35.6% were from 45 to 64; and 20.0% were 65 years of age or older. The gender makeup of the city was 48.9% male and 51.1% female.

As of the 2008-2012 American Community Survey the median income for a household in the city was $32,813, and the median income for a family was $33,438. The per capita income for the city was $16,621.

As of the census of 2000, there were 59 people, 22 households, and 17 families living in the town. The population density was 83.6 inhabitants per square mile (32.3/km^{2}). There were 26 housing units at an average density of 36.8 per square mile (14.2/km^{2}). The racial makeup of the town was 91.53% White and 8.47% African American.

There were 22 households, out of which 40.9% had children under the age of 18 living with them, 72.7% were married couples living together, 4.5% had a female householder with no husband present, and 22.7% were non-families. 18.2% of all households were made up of individuals, and 4.5% had someone living alone who was 65 years of age or older. The average household size was 2.68 and the average family size was 3.12.

In the town, the population was spread out, with 28.8% under the age of 18, 6.8% from 18 to 24, 28.8% from 25 to 44, 18.6% from 45 to 64, and 16.9% who were 65 years of age or older. The median age was 35 years. For every 100 females, there were 84.4 males. For every 100 females age 18 and over, there were 75.0 males.

The median income for a household in the town was $32,500, and the median income for a family was $36,667. Males had a median income of $35,000 versus $46,250 for females. The per capita income for the town was $20,575. None of the population or the families were below the poverty line.
