= King's Creek (Maryland) =

Stream in Talbot County, Maryland, U.S.

Coordinates: 38.794487°N 75.979891°W

King's Creek is a stream in Talbot County, Maryland, running for about 6 miles (9.7 km). It flows into the Choptank River and thence into Chesapeake Bay.

== See also ==
- List of rivers of Maryland
