= Sharon, South Carolina =

- Town
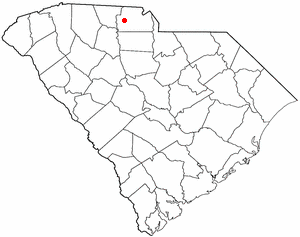
- Location of Sharon, South Carolina
- Coordinates: 34°57′07″N 81°20′37″W
- Country: United States
- State: South Carolina
- County: York

Area
  - Total: 1.31 sq mi (3.39 km^{2})
  - Land: 1.31 sq mi (3.39 km^{2})
  - Water: 0 sq mi (0.00 km^{2})
- Elevation: 604 ft (184 m)

Population (2020)
  - Total: 462
  - Density: 352.6/sq mi (136.14/km^{2})
- Time zone: UTC-5 (Eastern (EST))
  - Summer (DST): UTC-4 (EDT)
- ZIP code: 29742
- Area codes: 803, 839
- FIPS code: 45-65410
- GNIS feature ID: 2407322
- Website: https://sharonsc.gov/

Sharon is a town in western York County, South Carolina, United States. As of the 2020 census, Sharon had a population of 462.

== History ==
The Hill Complex Historic District, W.L. Hill Store, and Sharon Downtown Historic District are listed on the National Register of Historic Places.

== Geography ==
According to the United States Census Bureau, the town has a total area of 1.3 square miles (3.4 km^{2}), all land.

== Demographics ==
Historical population
Census	Pop.	Note	%±
1900	150		—
1910	374		149.3%
1920	419		12.0%
1930	324		−22.7%
1940	388		19.8%
1950	365		−5.9%
1960	280		−23.3%
1970	268		−4.3%
1980	323		20.5%
1990	270		−16.4%
2000	421		55.9%
2010	494		17.3%
2020	462		−6.5%
U.S. Decennial Census

As of the census of 2000, there were 421 people, 149 households, and 113 families residing in the town. The population density was 329.7 inhabitants per square mile (127.3/km^{2}). There were 161 housing units at an average density of 126.1 per square mile (48.7/km^{2}). The racial makeup of the town was 94.54% White, 3.80% African American, 0.95% Native American, and 0.71% from two or more races.

There were 149 households, out of which 35.6% had children under the age of 18 living with them, 63.8% were married couples living together, 9.4% had a female householder with no husband present, and 23.5% were non-families. 19.5% of all households were made up of individuals, and 10.1% had someone living alone who was 65 years of age or older. The average household size was 2.83 and the average family size was 3.25.

In the town, the population was spread out, with 28.5% under the age of 18, 8.8% from 18 to 24, 27.1% from 25 to 44, 23.3% from 45 to 64, and 12.4% who were 65 years of age or older. The median age was 34 years. For every 100 females, there were 96.7 males. For every 100 females age 18 and over, there were 92.9 males.

The median income for a household in the town was $35,250, and the median income for a family was $36,875. Males had a median income of $26,071 versus $21,250 for females. The per capita income for the town was $13,798. About 7.3% of families and 8.8% of the population were below the poverty line, including 10.4% of those under age 18 and 7.4% of those age 65 or over.

== Miscellany ==
Sharon is the location of the highest building in the southwestern section of the county, in the former Hill's Mercantile, made from bricks which were fired on-site, at the turn of the 19th and 20th centuries. Sharon is home to the former First National Bank of Sharon incorporated 1889. From 1910 to 1929 the U.S. Bureau of Engraving produced national bank notes for it. It was the only bank in Western York County to survive the Depression. At the time of its merger in 1986 with the First Citizens Bank and Trust of South Carolina, it was the oldest continuously operating national in York County. The Bank's distinctive architecture helped to get it placed in the National Register of Historic Places in 2001.

== Media ==
Sharon is home to a free daily online and monthly print newspaper, the YoCoNews that covers all of York and Lancaster counties.
