= South Carolina Highway 223 =

State highway in South Carolina, United States

South Carolina Highway 223
- Wylies Mill Road

Route information
- Maintained by SCDOT
- Length: 6.740 mi (10.847 km)
- Existed: 1940–present

Major junctions
- West end: SC 9 / SC 901 north of Richburg
- East end: US 21 in Landsford

Location
- Country: United States
- State: South Carolina
- Counties: Chester

Highway system
- South Carolina State Highway System; Interstate; US; State; Scenic
| ← US 221 | → SC 225 |

South Carolina Highway 223 (SC 223) is a 6.740-mile (10.847 km) primary state highway in the U.S. state of South Carolina. It serves as a connector between Richburg and Landsford Canal State Park.

== Route description ==
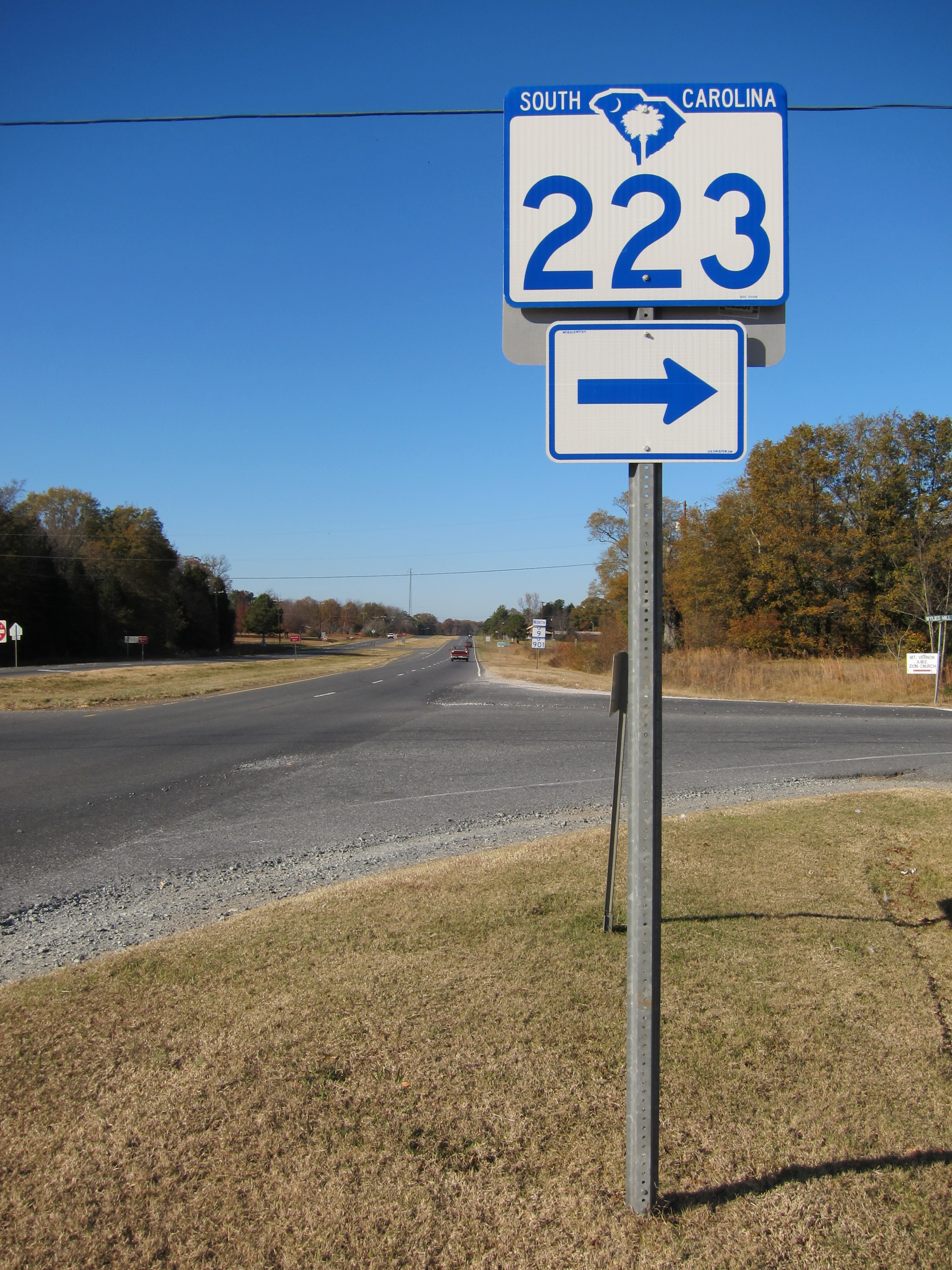
SC 223 near Richburg

SC 223 is a two-lane rural highway that traverses from SC 9 and SC 901 north of Richburg to U.S. Route 21 (US 21) in the community of Landsford and Landsford Canal State Park.

== History ==
The first SC 223 appeared from 1939 to 1940 as a spur off SC 22, renumbered as an extension of SC 901.

The current SC 223 was established in 1940, connecting Richburg with US 21. In 1948, it was briefly downgraded as a secondary road, but was resurrected a year later after the road was fully paved; changed little since.

== Major intersections ==
The entire route is in Chester County.

| Location | mi | km | Destinations | Notes |
|---|---|---|---|---|
| | 0.000 | 0.000 | SC 9 / SC 901 (Lancaster Highway) – Lancaster, Chester | |
| Landsford | 6.740 | 10.847 | US 21 (Catawba River Road) – Fort Lawn, Rock Hill | |
1.000 mi = 1.609 km; 1.000 km = 0.621 mi
