= South Carolina Highway 5 =

Highway in South Carolina

South Carolina Highway 5

Route information
- Maintained by SCDOT
- Length: 51.719 mi (83.234 km)
- Existed: 1922–present

Major junctions
- South end: US 521 near Van Wyck
- US 21 in Lesslie; I-77 in Rock Hill; US 321 / SC 161 in York; US 29 in Blacksburg
- North end: I-85 / SC 198 in Blacksburg

Location
- Country: United States
- State: South Carolina
- Counties: Lancaster, York, Cherokee

Highway system
- South Carolina State Highway System; Interstate; US; State; Scenic
← SC 4	→ SC 6

South Carolina Highway 5 (SC 5) is a 51.719-mile (83.234 km) primary state highway in the U.S. state of South Carolina. The highway, signed as north–south, travels in a northwest–southeast direction connecting the cities of Rock Hill, York and Blacksburg.

== Route description ==
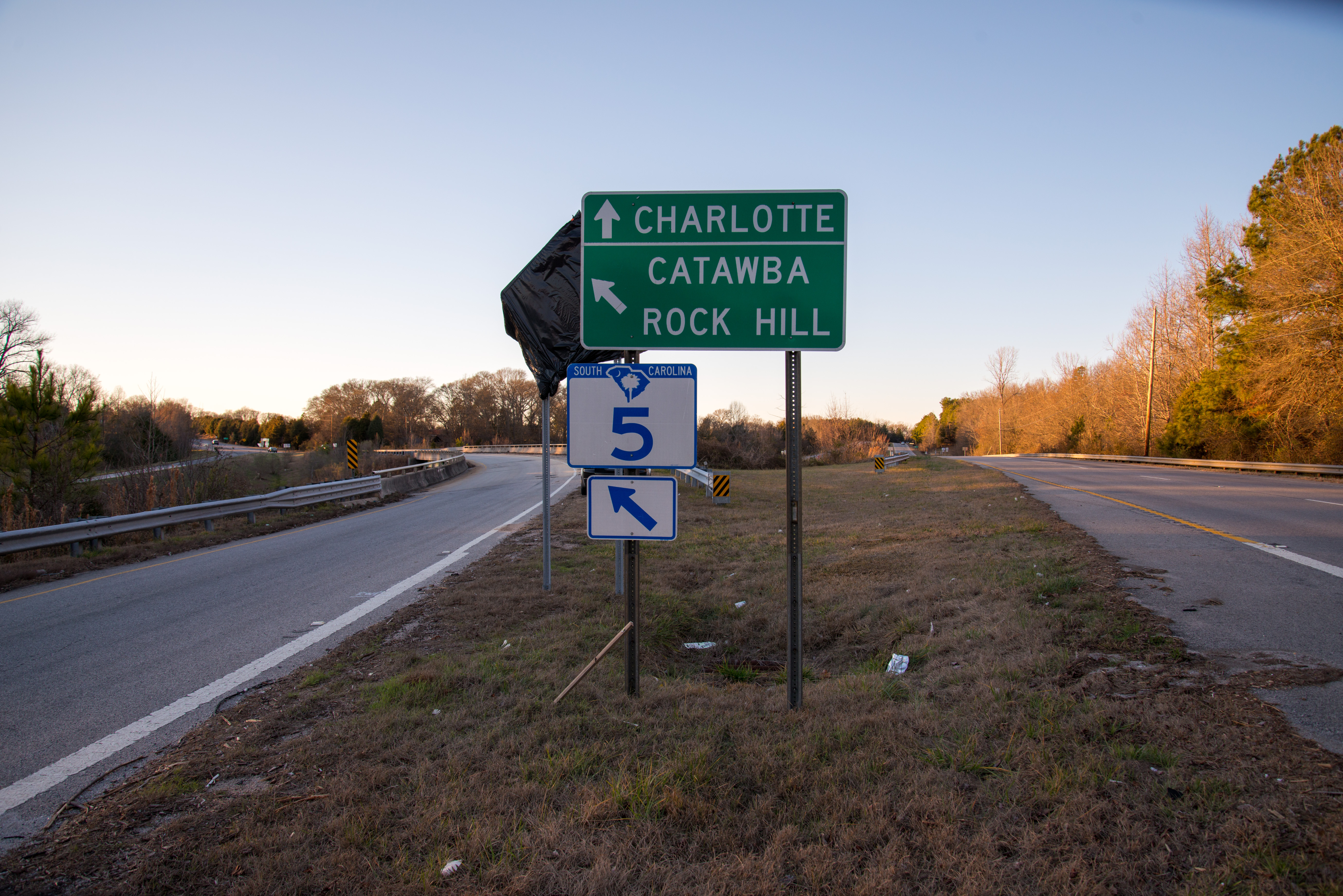
SC 5 left exit towards Catawba and Rock Hill, from US 521 near Van Wyck

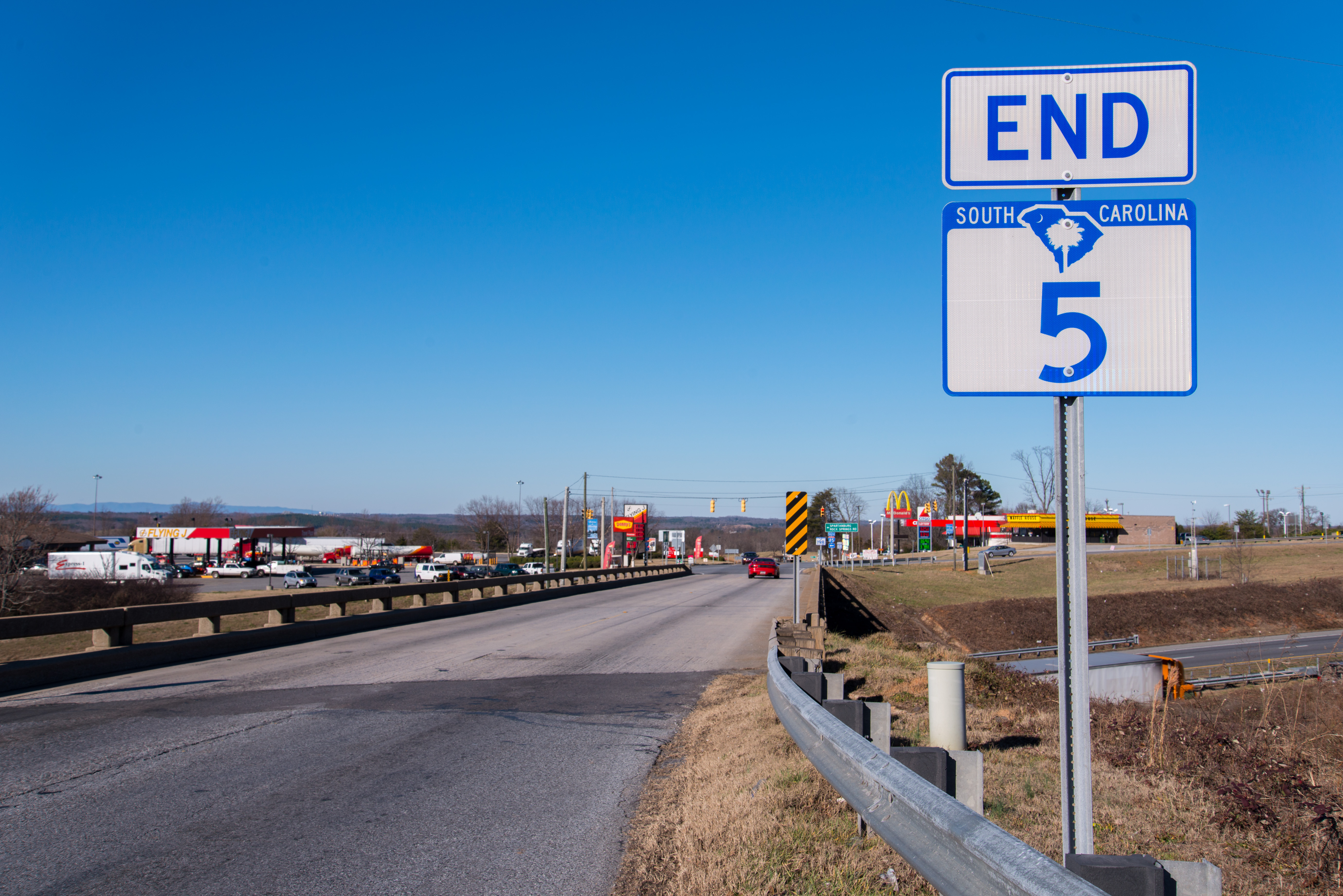
North end of SC 5 in Blacksburg

SC 5 begins with a semi-interchange with US 521 near Van Wyck. Going northwesterly nearly its entire route, it crosses the Catawba River entering York County. In Lesslie, it joins U.S. Route 21 (US 21), crossing over Interstate 77 (I-77) before splitting in Rock Hill. Going southwesterly around the downtown area, it overlaps SC 121 (Albright Highway); then going northwesterly again in, overlapping with SC 901 (Heckle Boulevard). SC 5 exits out of Rock Hill solo again towards York; where there, it joins SC 161 and bypasses northeasterly around the city. Continuing on its northwesterly direction, it reaches its final destination of Blacksburg, where it connects with US 29 before ending at I-85 (exit 102) and SC 198.

Speeds along the highway does not exceed 55 mph (89 km/h), in both urban and rural areas. The highway provides a direct route from both US 521 and I-85 to both York and Rock Hill.

== History ==
Established as an original state highway, SC 5 originally traveled from SC 9 in Fort Lawn, through Rock Hill and York, to SC 8 in Blacksburg. In 1929 or 1930, SC 5 was extended south along new primary routing to SC 22 in Great Falls. In 1938, SC 5 was extended on both directions, connecting north to SC 18 and south to US 21 in Ridgeway.

In 1939, SC 5 reached its longest length with its last extension south along US 21 through Columbia. Then continuing south, replacing parts of SC 3, SC 6 and SC 33, through Swansea, Denmark, Olar, and Fairfax, ending at US 17 in Hardeeville. It total length reached 243 miles (391 km).

In 1950, SC 5 was truncated at US 21/SC 322 in Rock Hill; its old alignment between Rock Hill and Columbia becoming solely US 21 and from Columbia to Hardeeville becoming US 321. In 1951 or 1952, its alignment between York and Kings Creek was rerouted replacing SC 324 and part of SC 55; its old alignment becoming SC 91, SC 211 and SC 907. In 1959, SC 5 was realigned onto a more direct routing between Rock Hill and York; its old alignment became part of SC 161 and SC 274. Between 1960 and 1962, SC 5 was extended to its current southern terminus with US 521 near Van Wyck. Between 1965 and 1967, US 21/SC 5 was given a freeway bypass around Lesslie, its old alignment becoming secondary road Lesslie Highway (S-46-6).

In 1986, SC 5 was rerouted on bypass northwest around York, its old alignment through downtown becoming SC 5 Business. Around 2006–2009, SC 5 rerouted to its current northern terminus with I-85/SC 198 in Blacksburg; its old alignment was downgraded to secondary roads. In 2013, SC 5 was rerouted southwest around Rock Hill, along Albright Road and Heckle Boulevard; its old alignment downgraded to city roads with only its northern section of Main Street, between Cherry Road and Heckle Boulevard, converting into a connector.

== Major intersections ==
County	Location	mi	km	Destinations	Notes
Lancaster		0.000	0.000	US 521 (Charlotte Highway) – Lancaster, Charlotte	Southern terminus; to Andrew Jackson State Park
Lancaster	Van Wyck	2.710	4.361	SC 75 east (Rebound Road) – Van Wyck	Western terminus of SC 75
York	Lesslie	8.119	13.066	US 21 south (Anderson Road) – Columbia	Southern end of US 21 concurrency
York	Rock Hill	10.730– 11.115	17.268– 17.888	Springfield Road – Lesslie	Interchange; exit ramps not clearly marked
York	Rock Hill	11.692	18.816	I-77 – Columbia, Charlotte	I-77 exit 77
York	Rock Hill	13.374	21.523	US 21 north / SC 121 north (Anderson Road) – Fort Mill	Northern end of US 21 concurrency; southern end of SC 121 concurrency
York	Rock Hill	15.839	25.490	SC 121 south (Albright Road) – Chester	Northern end of SC 121 concurrency
York	Rock Hill	16.019	25.780	SC 72 (Saluda Street) / SC 901 south – Chester, Edgemoor	Southern end of SC 901 concurrency
York	Rock Hill	18.669	30.045	SC 322 (Cherry Road / McConnells Highway) – McConnells	Southern end of SC 322 concurrency
York	Rock Hill	19.259	30.994	SC 901 north (Heckle Boulevard) / SC 5 Conn. south (Main Street) – Newport	Northern end of SC 901 concurrency; northern terminus of SC 5 Conn.
York	York	28.409	45.720	SC 161 / SC 5 Bus. north / SC 161 Bus. north (Old York Road) – Rock Hill, York	Southern end of SC 161 concurrency; southern terminus of SC 5 Bus. and SC 161 Bus.
York	York	30.439	48.987	SC 49 (Charlotte Highway) – York, Lake Wylie, Charlotte	
York	York	32.636– 32.649	52.523– 52.543	US 321 / SC 161 north / SC 161 Bus. south (Filbert Highway) – Clover, York	Northern end of SC 161 concurrency; northern terminus of SC 161 Bus.
York		33.539	53.976	SC 5 Bus. south (Black Highway) – York	Northern terminus of SC 5 Bus.
Cherokee		43.589	70.150	SC 55 east (Clover Highway) – Clover	Western terminus of SC 55
Cherokee	Kings Creek	44.789	72.081	SC 97 south – Hickory Grove	Northern terminus of SC 97
Cherokee	Blacksburg	50.539	81.335	US 29 (Cherokee Street) – Gastonia, Blacksburg	
Cherokee	Blacksburg	51.632– 51.719	83.094– 83.234	I-85 / SC 198 east (Mountain Street) – Charlotte, Spartanburg, Earl	Northern terminus of SC 5; western terminus of SC 198; I-85 exit 102
1.000 mi = 1.609 km; 1.000 km = 0.621 mi: Concurrency terminus

== Special routes ==
=== Hardeeville alternate route ===
South Carolina Highway 5 Alternate
- Location: Hardeeville, South Carolina
- Existed: 1939–1947

South Carolina Highway 5 Alternate (SC 5 Alt.) was an alternate route of SC 5 when the mainline existed in Hardeeville. It traveled between SC 5 (now US 321) and US 17/SC 46. It was established in 1939 and became part of SC 46 in 1947.

=== Rock Hill truck route ===
South Carolina Highway 5 Truck
- Location: Rock Hill, South Carolina
- Length: 5.1 mi (8.2 km)
- Existed: N/A–2013

South Carolina Highway 5 Truck (SC 5 Truck) was a truck route that once provided an alternate route for truck drivers to bypass downtown Rock Hill, via SC 72 (Albright Road) and SC 901 (Heckle Boulevard). In 2013, mainline SC 5 was rerouted from downtown Rock Hill and onto the truck route, thus eliminating it.

=== Rock Hill connector ===
South Carolina Highway 5 Connector
- Location: Rock Hill, South Carolina
- Length: 1.040 mi (1.674 km)
- Existed: 2013–present

South Carolina Highway 5 Connector (SC 5 Conn.) was established in 2013 when mainline SC 5 was rerouted west around downtown Rock Hill, via Heckle Boulevard; the connector route follows its old alignment on Main Street between SC 322 (Cherry Road) and SC 5/SC 901 (Heckle Boulevard). It is known as West Main Street, Veterans Memorial Highway, and Juanita Goggins Highway for its entire length.

It begins at an intersection with SC 322 (South Cherry Road) in the northwestern part of Rock Hill, which is in the east-central part of York County. It travels to the northwest and then curves to the west-northwest. A short distance later, it meets its northern terminus, an intersection with SC 5/SC 901.

The entire route is in Rock Hill, York County.

mi	km	Destinations	Notes
0.000	0.000	SC 322 (South Cherry Road) / West Main Street east – Downtown Rock Hill, Cherry Park, Glencairn Garden	Southern terminus; roadway continues as West Main Street.
1.040	1.674	SC 5 south / SC 901 south (Heckle Boulevard) – Clinton College SC 5 north (West Main Street west) – York SC 901 north (Heckle Boulevard) – Aquatics Center	Northern terminus; SC 5 north takes on the West Main Street name.
1.000 mi = 1.609 km; 1.000 km = 0.621 mi

=== York business loop ===
South Carolina Highway 5 Business
- Location: York, South Carolina
- Length: 4.290 mi (6.904 km)
- Existed: 1986–present

South Carolina Highway 5 Business (SC 5 Bus.) follows the old route of SC 5 through downtown York, via Liberty Street. The highway begins on SC 5 just 1.5 miles (2.4 km) away northwest from downtown York. It connects with US 321/SC 161 and US 321 Business. After traveling through the downtown area, it links to the northern terminus of SC 324 before eventually rejoining mainline SC 5 southeast of York.
