= South Carolina Highway 99 =

State highway in South Carolina, United States

South Carolina Highway 99

Route information
- Maintained by SCDOT
- Length: 9.220 mi (14.838 km)

Major junctions
- South end: US 21 / SC 200 in Great Falls
- SC 97 in Great Falls
- North end: SC 9 southeast of Richburg

Location
- Country: United States
- State: South Carolina
- Counties: Chester

Highway system
- South Carolina State Highway System; Interstate; US; State; Scenic
← SC 97	→ SC 101

South Carolina Highway 99 (SC 99) is a 9.220-mile-long (14.838 km) state highway in the U.S. state of South Carolina. The highway connects Great Falls with rural areas of Chester County.

== Route description ==
SC 99 begins at an intersection with U.S. Route 21 (US 21) and SC 200 (Pendergrass Boulevard) in Great Falls within Chester County. It travels to the northwest. On the edge of the city limits of the town is an intersection with SC 97 (Francis Avenue). They have a very brief concurrency. SC 99 travels in a north-northwesterly direction and passes Howze Cemetery. The highway continues traveling through rural areas and meets its northern terminus, an intersection with SC 9 (Lancaster Highway).

== Major intersections ==
The entire route is in Chester County.

Location	mi	km	Destinations	Notes
Great Falls	0.000	0.000	US 21 / SC 200 (Pendergrass Boulevard / Chester Avenue) – Winnsboro, Columbia, Lancaster, Rock Hill	
Great Falls	0.890	1.432	SC 97 south (Francis Avenue) – Liberty Hill, Camden	Southern end of SC 97 concurrency
	0.930	1.497	SC 97 north (Great Falls Road) to I-77 – Chester	Northern end of SC 97 concurrency
	9.220	14.838	SC 9 (Lancaster Highway) – Chester, Fort Lawn	
1.000 mi = 1.609 km; 1.000 km = 0.621 mi: Concurrency terminus
