= South Carolina Highway 914 =

State highway in South Carolina, United States

South Carolina Highway 914

Route information
- Maintained by SCDOT
- Length: 1.720 mi (2.768 km)

Major junctions
- West end: SC 9 Bus. on the Lancaster–Lancaster Mill line
- East end: SC 200 in Springdale

Location
- Country: United States
- State: South Carolina
- Counties: Lancaster

Highway system
- South Carolina State Highway System; Interstate; US; State; Scenic
← SC 912	→ SC 917

South Carolina Highway 914 (SC 914) is a 1.720-mile-long (2.768 km) state highway in the U.S. state of South Carolina. The highway connects Lancaster and Springdale, via Lancaster Mill.

== Route description ==
SC 914 begins at an intersection with SC 9 Business (SC 9 Bus.; West Meeting Street) on the Lancaster–Lancaster Mill line, within Lancaster County. It travels to the southeast and immediately enters Lancaster Mill proper and curves to the south-southeast. Just after Old Landsford Road, it crosses over some railroad tracks. One block later, at Mahaffey Line Drive, SC 914 travels along the Lancaster Mill–Springdale line for a few blocks. On the northwest corner of Lancaster Memorial Park cemetery, it enters Springdale proper. It curves to the southeast and intersects the eastern terminus of Grace Avenue. SC 914 turns left onto the roadway, now known as Airport Road. Two blocks later, it meets its eastern terminus, an intersection with SC 200 (Great Falls Highway). Here, Airport Road continues to the southeast.

== Major intersections ==
The entire route is in Lancaster County.

Location	mi	km	Destinations	Notes
Lancaster–Lancaster Mill line	0.000	0.000	SC 9 Bus. (West Meeting Street)	Western terminus
Springdale	1.720	2.768	SC 200 (Great Falls Highway) – Great Falls, Lancaster	Eastern terminus
1.000 mi = 1.609 km; 1.000 km = 0.621 mi
