= South Carolina Highway 901 =

State highway in South Carolina, United States

South Carolina Highway 901

Route information
- Maintained by SCDOT
- Length: 38.730 mi (62.330 km)
- Existed: 1931–present

Major junctions
- South end: SC 200 near Mitford
- I-77 in Rock Hill
- North end: SC 161 / SC 274 in Rock Hill

Location
- Country: United States
- State: South Carolina
- Counties: Fairfield, Chester, York

Highway system
- South Carolina State Highway System; Interstate; US; State; Scenic
← SC 823	→ SC 903

South Carolina Highway 901 (SC 901) is a 38.730-mile (62.330 km) primary state highway in the U.S. state of South Carolina. It serves as a slower alternate rural route to Interstate 77 (I-77) and the western bypass of Rock Hill.

== Route description ==
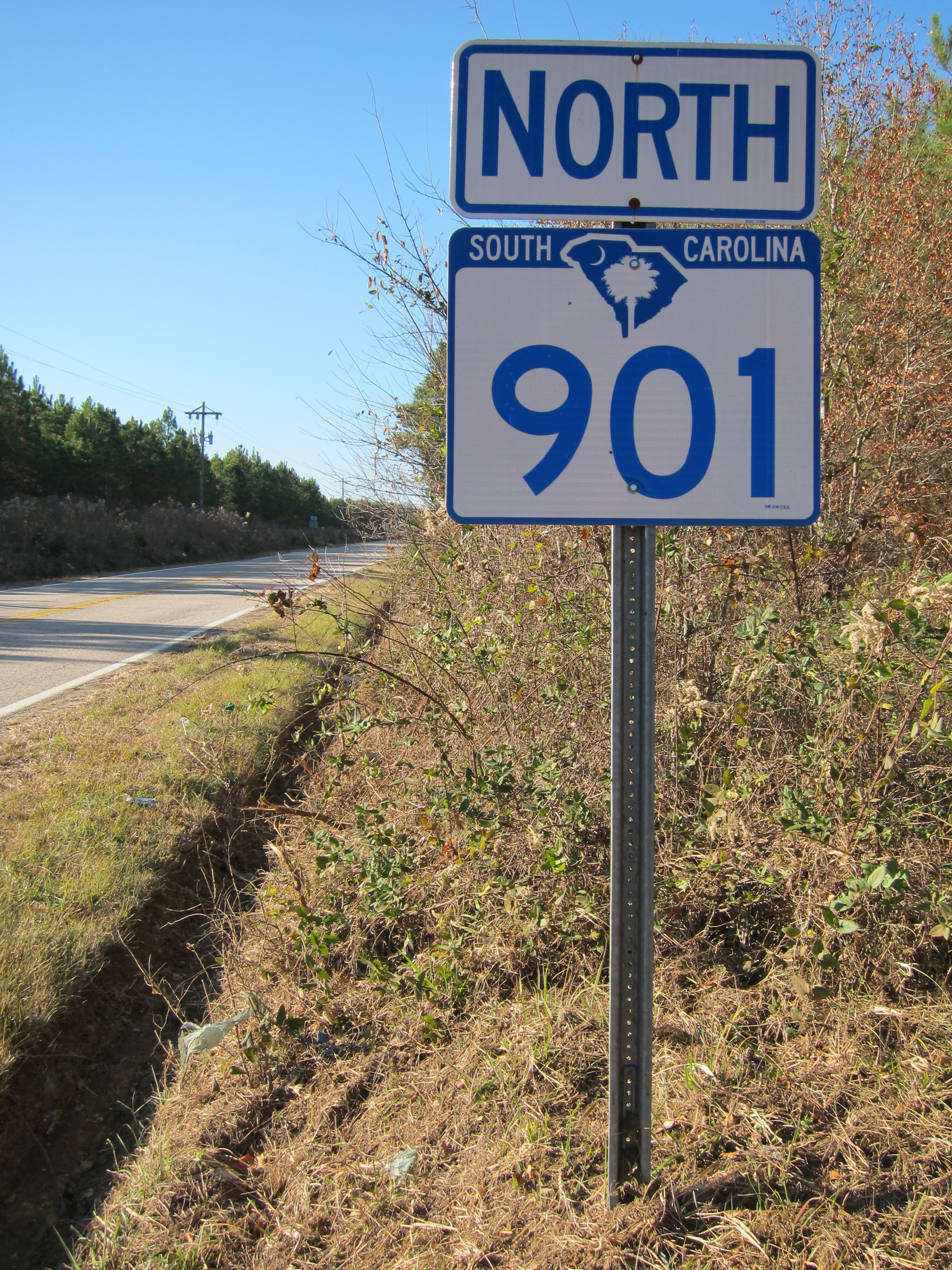
SC 901 north in Fairfield County

SC 901 begins along SC 200 near I-77. Going north, it hovers to the west and then east of I-77 and then passes through Richburg. After entering York County, it has its own interchange with I-77, then proceeds to form the western bypass of Rock Hill. It is a two-lane rural highway in Fairfield and Chester counties, four lanes wide in York County.

In Rock Hill, SC 901 is known as Heckle Boulevard in honor of H.N. Heckle, who served as South Carolina Department of Transportation District 4 Construction Engineer during the late 1940s through 1960s.

== History ==
Established as a new primary routing in 1930 or 1931, it originally ran from SC 9 near Richburg to the York County line. In 1933, it was extended north to U.S. Route 21 (US 21). In 1940, it was extended south to its current southern terminus with SC 22 (today's SC 200). Between 1949 and 1950, it was briefly truncated south at SC 97. Between 1974 and 1979, it was extended north to SC 5. In 1992, it was extended again to its current northern terminus with SC 161/SC 274.

In 2010, SC 901 was widened to four lanes from I-77 to SC 121 funded through the "Pennies for Progress" project fund.

== Major intersections ==
County	Location	mi	km	Destinations	Notes
Fairfield		0.000	0.000	SC 200 – Winnsboro, Great Falls	Southern terminus
Chester		7.970	12.826	SC 97 (Great Falls Road) – Chester, Great Falls	
Chester	Richburg	17.510	28.180	SC 9 south (Lancaster Highway) – Lancaster	Southern end of SC 9 concurrency
Chester	Richburg	18.700	30.095	SC 223 east (Wylies Mill Road) – Landsford Canal State Park	Western terminus of SC 223
Chester		19.070	30.690	SC 9 north (Lancaster Highway) – Chester	Northern end of SC 9 concurrency
York	Rock Hill	28.560– 28.570	45.963– 45.979	I-77 – Columbia, Charlotte	I-77 exit 73
York	Rock Hill	31.740	51.081	SC 72 south / SC 121 (Albright Road) – Chester, Charlotte	Southern end of SC 72 concurrency
York	Rock Hill	32.040	51.563	SC 5 south (South Heckle Boulevard south) / SC 72 east (Saluda Street north) to I-77 north – Downtown Rock Hill	Northern end of SC 72 concurrency; southern end of SC 5 concurrency
York	Rock Hill	34.690	55.828	SC 322 (Cherry Road / McConnells Highway) – McConnells	
York	Rock Hill	35.280	56.778	SC 5 north / SC 5 Conn. south (Main Street) – York, Rock Hill, Downtown Rock Hill	Northern end of SC 5 concurrency; northern terminus of SC 5 Conn.
York	Rock Hill	38.730	62.330	SC 161 / SC 274 (Old York Road) – York	Northern terminus
1.000 mi = 1.609 km; 1.000 km = 0.621 mi: Concurrency terminus
