= South Carolina Highway 200 =

State highway in South Carolina, United States

South Carolina Highway 200

Route information
- Maintained by SCDOT
- Length: 42.780 mi (68.848 km)
- Existed: 1938–present

Major junctions
- West end: US 321 / SC 34 in Winnsboro
- I-77 near Winnsboro; US 21 near Great Falls; US 521 / US 521 Bus. / SC 9 in Lancaster
- East end: NC 200 at the North Carolina state line near JAARS

Location
- Country: United States
- State: South Carolina
- Counties: Fairfield, Chester, Lancaster

Highway system
- South Carolina State Highway System; Interstate; US; State; Scenic
← SC 198	→ SC 201

South Carolina Highway 200 (SC 200) is a 42.780-mile (68.848 km) primary state highway in the U.S. state of South Carolina. The highway travels more in a north–south direction, despite being signed as east–west. It connects the cities of Winnsboro, Great Falls, and Lancaster.

== Route description ==
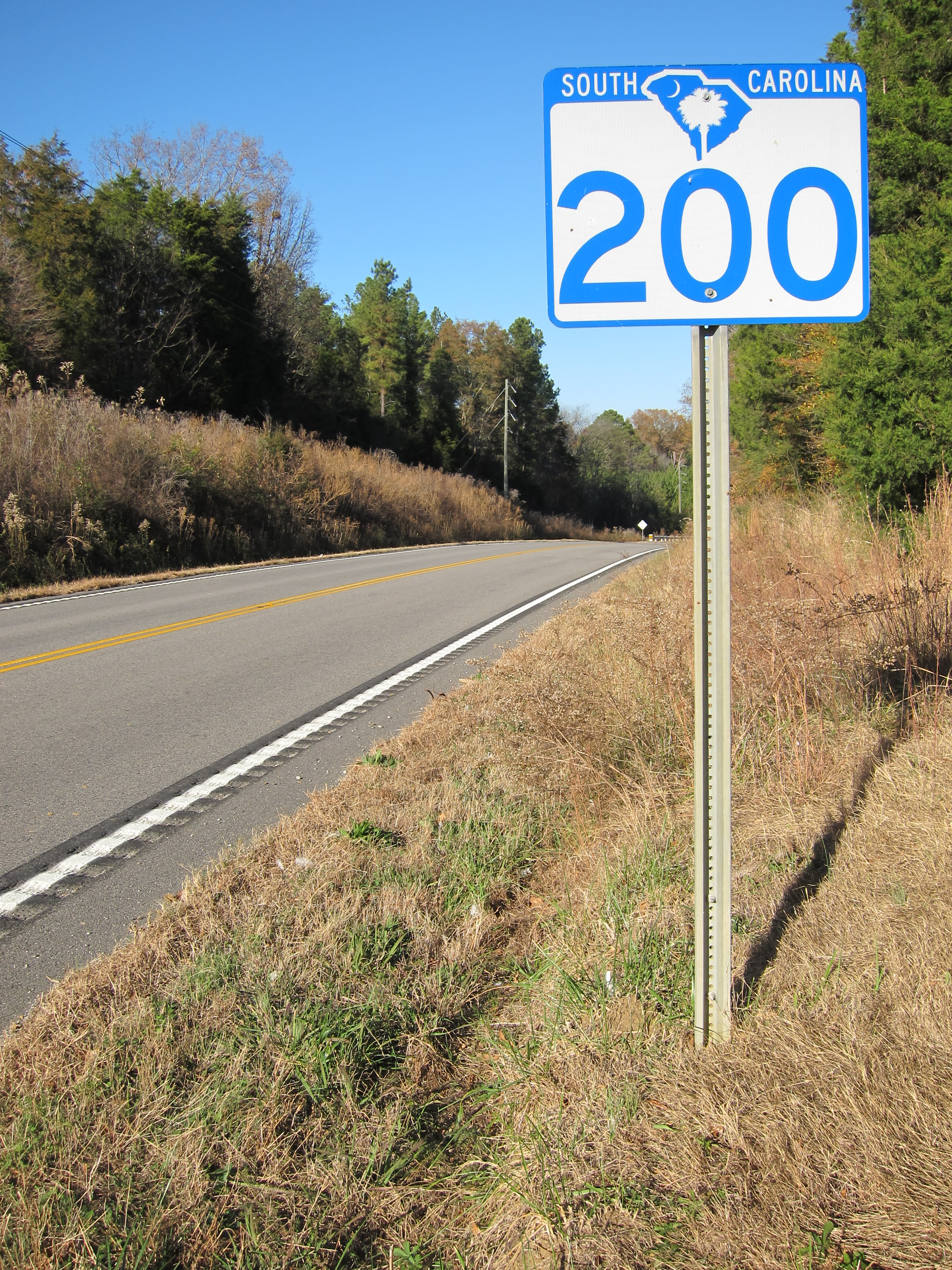
SC 200 in Fairfield County

SC 200 is mostly a rural two-lane highway, traversing northwest from Winnsboro, through Great Falls and Lancaster, to the North Carolina state line.

== History ==
Established in 1938 as a renumbering part of SC 93 to match NC 200; it originally traversed 7 miles (11 km) from US 521 to the North Carolina state line. By 1952, SC 200 was extended to its current southern terminus in Winnsboro; this replaced SC 93 from Lancaster to Great Falls and SC 22 from Great Falls to Winnsboro.

=== South Carolina Highway 93 ===
South Carolina Highway 93
- Location: Great Falls–Lancaster, South Carolina
- Existed: c.1926–September 1951

South Carolina Highway 93 (SC 93) was a state highway that was established in 1925 or 1926 from SC 9 in Lancaster to the North Carolina state line north of the city, where the roadway continued as North Carolina Highway 200. In 1932, it was extended to SC 97 just northeast of Great Falls. In 1938, its northern terminus was truncated to what was US 521/SC 9 in Lancaster. Its former path was redesignated as SC 200. In 1940, its path through Lancaster was re-worked, with its former path becoming SC 93 Alternate (SC 93 Alt.). In 1952, the rest of SC 93 was decommissioned, with most of its path becoming part of SC 200.

==== Lancaster alternate route ====
South Carolina Highway 93 Alternate
- Location: Lancaster, South Carolina
- Existed: 1937–1947

South Carolina Highway 93 Alternate (SC 93 Alt.) was an alternate route that existed partially in Lancaster. It was established in February 1937 as part of a re-routing of SC 93 in Lancaster. It traveled from SC 93 and SC 914 in Crocketts Crossroads to what was US 521/SC 9 in Lancaster. In 1947, it was decommissioned and downgraded to secondary roads. Today, it is known as Springdale Road and Midway Street.

== Major intersections ==
County	Location	mi	km	Destinations	Notes
Fairfield	Winnsboro	0.000	0.000	US 321 / SC 34 (Newberry Road) – Chester, Columbia, Newberry	Western terminus
Fairfield	Winnsboro	0.510	0.821	Evans Street south (SC 200 Conn. south)	Northern terminus of SC 200 Conn.
Fairfield	Winnsboro	0.740	1.191	US 321 Bus. – Chester, Winnsboro	
Fairfield		10.650	17.140	SC 901 north – Richburg	Southern terminus of SC 901
Fairfield		11.374– 11.730	18.305– 18.878	I-77 – Columbia, Charlotte	I-77 exit 48
Fairfield		17.220	27.713	US 21 south – Ridgeway, Columbia	Western end of US 21 concurrency
Chester	Great Falls	20.270	32.621	SC 99 north (Chester Avenue) – Chester	Southern terminus of SC 99
Chester	Great Falls	21.490	34.585	SC 97 north (Francis Avenue) – Chester	Western end of SC 97 concurrency
Chester	Great Falls	21.630	34.810	US 21 north (Catawba River Road) – Fort Lawn, Rock Hill, Charlotte	Eastern end of US 21 concurrency
Lancaster		22.110	35.583	SC 97 south (Cedar Creek Road) – Camden	Eastern end of SC 97 concurrency
Lancaster	Lancaster	31.470	50.646	SC 914 west (Memorial Park Road)	Eastern terminus of SC 914
Lancaster	Lancaster	33.370	53.704	US 521 Bus. south (Main Street) – Kershaw	Western end of US 521 Bus. concurrency
Lancaster	Lancaster	35.640	57.357	SC 903 south (Chesterfield Avenue) – Hartsville	Northern terminus of SC 903
Lancaster	Lancaster	36.020	57.969	SC 9 Bus. (Meeting Street)	
Lancaster	Lancaster	35.390	56.955	US 521 / US 521 Bus. north / SC 9 (Lancaster Bypass) – Pageland, Kershaw, Chester, Charlotte	Eastern end of US 521 Bus. concurrency
Lancaster		42.780	68.848	NC 200 north	Continuation beyond North Carolina state line
1.000 mi = 1.609 km; 1.000 km = 0.621 mi: Concurrency terminus

== Winnsboro connector route ==
South Carolina Highway 200 Connector
- Location: Winnsboro
- Length: 0.490 mi (789 m)

South Carolina Highway 200 Connector (SC 200 Conn.) is a 0.490-mile-long (0.789 km) connector route that is completely within the north-central part of Winnsboro and the central part of Fairfield County. It is known as Evans Street and is an unsigned highway.

The connector route begins at an intersection with U.S. Route 321 Business (US 321 Bus.; Congress Street). The highway travels to the northwest, through a residential area of the city. It bends slightly to the west-northwest just before it reaches its northern terminus, an intersection with the SC 200 mainline. Here, the roadway continues as Evans Street Extension.

The entire route is in Winnsboro, Fairfield County.

mi	km	Destinations	Notes
0.000	0.000	Congress Street (US 321 Bus.)	Southern terminus
0.490	0.789	SC 200	Northern terminus
1.000 mi = 1.609 km; 1.000 km = 0.621 mi
