= Eureka Mill, South Carolina =

- Census-designated place
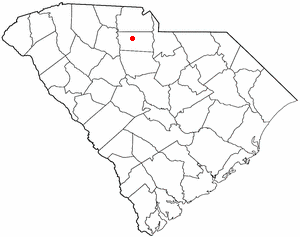
- Location of Eureka Mill, South Carolina
- Coordinates: 34°43′05″N 81°11′34″W
- Country: United States
- State: South Carolina
- County: Chester

Area
  - Total: 1.26 sq mi (3.26 km^{2})
  - Land: 1.26 sq mi (3.26 km^{2})
  - Water: 0 sq mi (0.00 km^{2})
- Elevation: 518 ft (158 m)

Population (2020)
  - Total: 1,420
  - Density: 1,128.6/sq mi (435.77/km^{2})
- Time zone: UTC-5 (Eastern (EST))
  - Summer (DST): UTC-4 (EDT)
- ZIP code: 29706
- Area code: 803
- FIPS code: 45-24020
- GNIS feature ID: 2402463

Eureka Mill is a census-designated place (CDP) in Chester County, South Carolina, United States. The population was 1,476 at the 2010 census, down from 1,737 at the 2000 census.

== Geography ==
Eureka Mill is an unincorporated suburban area on the northeastern side of the city of Chester, the county seat. South Carolina Highway 97, the J.A. Cochran Bypass, loops through the CDP, while Highway 72/121 is the main radial road leading out of Chester northeastward through the CDP. South Carolina Highway 9 forms the southern boundary of the CDP, leading eastward out from the center of Chester.

According to the United States Census Bureau, the Eureka Mill CDP has a total area of 1.29 square miles (3.34 km^{2}), all of it land.

== Demographics ==
Historical population
Census	Pop.	Note	%±
2020	1,420		—
U.S. Decennial Census

As of the census of 2000, there were 1,737 people, 666 households, and 464 families residing in the CDP. The population density was 1,282.7 inhabitants per square mile (495.3/km^{2}). There were 733 housing units at an average density of 541.3 per square mile (209.0/km^{2}). The racial makeup of the CDP was 50.26% White, 48.53% African American, 0.46% Native American, 0.29% Asian, 0.06% from other races, and 0.40% from two or more races. Hispanic or Latino of any race were 0.40% of the population.

There were 666 households, out of which 33.9% had children under the age of 18 living with them, 39.0% were married couples living together, 26.0% had a female householder with no husband present, and 30.2% were non-families. 26.3% of all households were made up of individuals, and 11.4% had someone living alone who was 65 years of age or older. The average household size was 2.59 and the average family size was 3.14.

In the CDP, the population was spread out, with 28.1% under the age of 18, 10.7% from 18 to 24, 29.2% from 25 to 44, 19.5% from 45 to 64, and 12.6% who were 65 years of age or older. The median age was 33 years. For every 100 females, there were 81.1 males. For every 100 females age 18 and over, there were 78.9 males.

The median income for a household in the CDP was $29,273, and the median income for a family was $33,690. Males had a median income of $28,821 versus $20,385 for females. The per capita income for the CDP was $11,809. About 13.0% of families and 17.1% of the population were below the poverty line, including 18.4% of those under age 18 and 18.9% of those age 65 or over.
