= South Carolina Highway 97 =

State highway in South Carolina, United States

South Carolina Highway 97

Route information
- Maintained by SCDOT
- Length: 89.800 mi (144.519 km)
- Tourist routes: Western York Scenic Byway

Major junctions
- South end: US 521 / US 601 in Camden
- US 21 in Great Falls; I-77 near Great Falls; US 321 / US 321 Bus. near Chester
- North end: SC 5 near Kings Creek

Location
- Country: United States
- State: South Carolina
- Counties: Kershaw, Lancaster, Chester, York, Cherokee

Highway system
- South Carolina State Highway System; Interstate; US; State; Scenic
← I-95	→ SC 99

South Carolina Highway 97 (SC 97) is a 89.800-mile (144.519 km) state highway in the U.S. state of South Carolina. The highway connects Camden, Great Falls, Chester, and Hickory Grove.

== Route description ==
SC 97 begins at an intersection with U.S. Route 521 (US 521)/US 601 (Broad Street) in Camden within Kershaw County, northeast of the Camden Country Club. The highway travels to the northwest and meets US 521 Truck/US 601 Truck (Boykin Road) just before leaving the city limits of Camden. It travels through rural areas of the county, crosses over part of Lake Wateree, and enters Liberty Hill. There, it has an intersection with the western terminus of SC 522 (Stoneboro Road). A short distance later, it enters Lancaster County. It continues traveling through rural areas until it intersects SC 200 (Great Falls Highway). The two highways travel concurrently to the west. Almost immediately, they cross over the Catawba River on the Tom G. Mangum Bridge, where they enter Chester County. This bridge is just south of the Fishing Creek Dam. Just after the bridge, the concurrency intersects US 21, which joins them. Immediately, they enter Great Falls. SC 97 departs the concurrency and travels along the northern edge of the city limits of the town until it intersects SC 99 (Chester Avenue). Immediately, they travel to the northwest and split. It intersects SC 901 (Mountain Gap Road) just before an interchange with Interstate 77 (I-77).

Just before entering Chester, SC 97 passes Old Purity Cemetery and the Chester County Hospital. It then intersects US 321 (Columbia Road), which begins a concurrency with the highway. A short distance later, US 321 splits off at an intersection with US 321 Bus./SC 9/SC 72/SC 121 (J.A. Cochran Bypass), northeast of Chester High School. SC 9/SC 72/SC 97/SC 121 travels along the bypass to the northeast. At Lancaster Highway, SC 9 departs the concurrency to the east, and SC 9 Bus. travels to the west. The concurrency enters Eureka Mill. At Saluda Road, SC 72/SC 121 departs to the northeast, while SC 97 continues to the north-northwest. It curves to the west and briefly leaves the city limits of Eureka Mill. After the highway curves to the southwest, it enters Chester. At Center Street, it begins a concurrency with US 321 Bus. The highways travel to the northwest and leave Chester. They cross over the Sandy River just before intersecting US 321. Here, the business route ends, and SC 97 continues to the northwest, winding its way through mostly wooded areas. A short distance after entering York County, it intersects SC 322 (W. McConnells Highway). Just over 1 mile (1.6 km) later, it meets SC 49 (Lockhart Road). It crosses over Bullock Creek on an unnamed bridge. The highway curves to the north and then to the northeast before entering Hickory Grove. Immediately, there is an intersection with SC 211 (Smithford Road). The two highways travel concurrently into downtown and split at Wylie Avenue. The highway travels in a northerly direction and enters Smyrna. Just before leaving the city limits of Smyrna, SC 97 enters Cherokee County. The road travels through Kings Creek and meets its northern terminus, an intersection with SC 5 (York Highway).

== Major intersections ==
County	Location	mi	km	Destinations	Notes
Kershaw	Camden	0.000	0.000	US 521 (Broad Street) / US 601 – Kershaw, Charlotte	Southern terminus
Kershaw	Camden	1.060	1.706	US 521 Truck / US 601 Truck (Springdale Drive west / Boykin Road east)	
Kershaw	Liberty Hill	18.440	29.676	SC 522 east (Stoneboro Road) – Stoneboro, Heath Springs	Western terminus of SC 522
Lancaster		29.880	48.087	SC 200 east (Great Falls Highway) – Lancaster	Southern end of SC 200 concurrency
Catawba River		30.096	48.435	Tom G. Mangum Bridge	
Chester		30.360	48.860	US 21 north (Catawba River Road) – Rock Hill	Southern end of US 21 concurrency
Chester	Great Falls	30.500	49.085	US 21 south / SC 200 west	Northern end of US 21 and SC 200 concurrencies
Chester	Great Falls	31.910	51.354	SC 99 south (Chester Avenue)	Southern end of SC 99 concurrency
Chester		31.950	51.419	SC 99 north	Northern end of SC 99 concurrency
Chester		36.250	58.339	SC 901 (Mountain Gap Road)	
Chester		37.932– 37.970	61.046– 61.107	I-77 – Charlotte	I-77 exit 55
Chester		50.250	80.870	US 321 south (Columbia Road) – Winnsboro	Southern end of US 321 concurrency
Chester		50.770	81.706	US 321 north / US 321 Bus. north / SC 9 north / SC 72 west / SC 121 south (J.A. Cochran Bypass) – York, Chester	Northern end of US 321 concurrency; southern end of SC 9 and SC 72/SC 121 concurrencies; southern terminus of US 321 Bus.
Chester	Eureka Mill	51.990	83.670	SC 9 south / SC 9 Bus. north (Lancaster Highway) – Chester, Lancaster	Northern end of SC 9 concurrency; southern terminus of SC 9 Bus.
Chester	Eureka Mill	53.010– 53.060	85.311– 85.392	SC 72 east / SC 121 north (Saluda Road)	Northern end of SC 72/SC 121 concurrency
Chester	Chester	55.220	88.868	US 321 Bus. south (Center Street)	Southern end of US 321 Bus. concurrency
Chester		57.140	91.958	US 321 (Lowrys Highway) / US 321 Bus. south – Winnsboro, York	Northern terminus of US 321 Bus.
York		70.690	113.765	SC 322 (W. McConnells Highway) – McConnells, Rock Hill	
York		72.020	115.905	SC 49 (Lockhart Road) – Lockhart, Sharon	
York	Hickory Grove	81.290	130.824	SC 211 north (Smithford Road)	Southern end of SC 211 concurrency
York	Hickory Grove	81.690	131.467	SC 211 south (Wylie Avenue) – Sharon, York	Northern end of SC 211 concurrency
Cherokee		89.800	144.519	SC 5 (York Highway) – York, Blacksburg	Northern terminus
1.000 mi = 1.609 km; 1.000 km = 0.621 mi: Concurrency terminus

== Chester business loop ==
South Carolina Highway 97 Business
- Location: Chester, South Carolina
- Existed: c.1987–c.2009

South Carolina Highway 97 Business (SC 97 Bus.) was a business route that was established between 1981 and 1987 as a renumbering of the SC 97 mainline through the main part of Chester. It was concurrent with U.S. Route 321 Business (US 321 Bus.). Between 2006 and 2009, SC 97 Bus. was decommissioned.
