= South Carolina Highway 324 =

State highway in South Carolina, United States

South Carolina Highway 324

Route information
- Maintained by SCDOT
- Length: 13.880 mi (22.338 km)
- Tourist routes: Western York Scenic Byway

Major junctions
- West end: SC 5 Bus. / SC 161 Bus. in York
- SC 322 near Rock Hill
- East end: SC 72 / SC 121 near Rock Hill

Location
- Country: United States
- State: South Carolina
- Counties: York

Highway system
- South Carolina State Highway System; Interstate; US; State; Scenic
← SC 322	→ SC 327

South Carolina Highway 324 (SC 324) is a 13.880-mile-long (22.338 km) state highway in the U.S. state of South Carolina. The highway connects York with the Rock Hill area.

== Route description ==
SC 324 begins at an intersection with SC 5 Business (SC 5 Bus.) and SC 161 Bus. (East Liberty Street) in York, York County. It passes Harold C. Johnson Elementary School before leaving the city limits. The highway travels in a fairly southeasterly direction. It intersects SC 322 (McConnells Highway). Farther along, it crosses over Stony Fork. SC 324 continues traveling through rural areas of the county and crosses some railroad tracks before meeting its eastern terminus, an intersection with SC 72/SC 121 (Saluda Road).

== Major intersections ==
The entire route is in York County.

Location	mi	km	Destinations	Notes
York	0.000	0.000	SC 5 Bus. (East Liberty Street / SC 161 Bus.) to SC 161	Western terminus
	8.870	14.275	SC 322 (McConnells Highway) – McConnells, Rock Hill	
	13.880	22.338	SC 72 / SC 121 (Saluda Road) – Chester, Rock Hill	Eastern terminus
1.000 mi = 1.609 km; 1.000 km = 0.621 mi
