= Landsford Canal =

- U.S. National Register of Historic Places
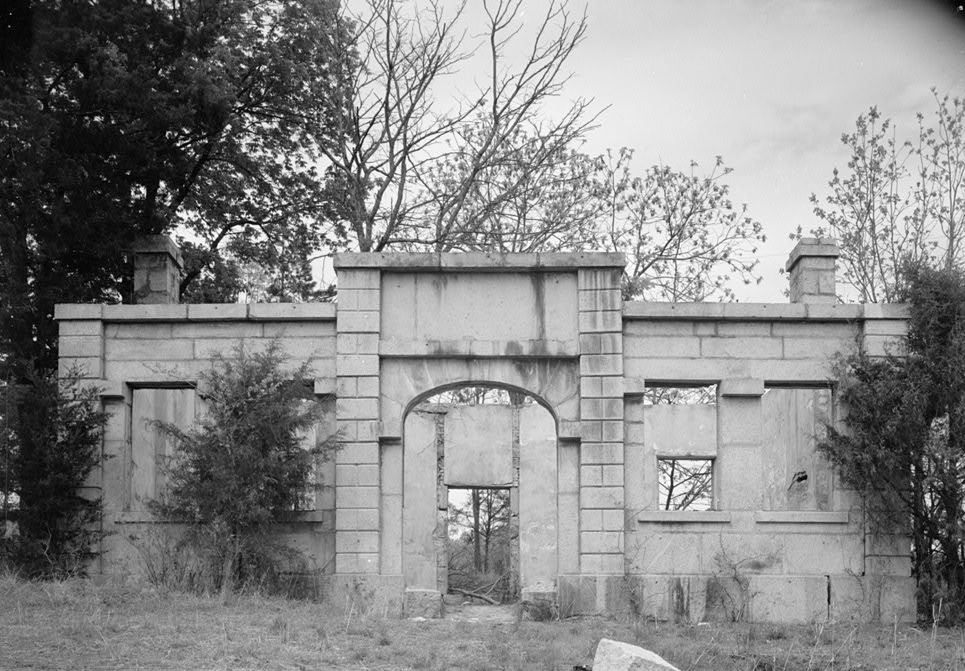
- The Lock Keeper's House at Rocky Mount Canal near Great Falls, downstream of the Landsford Canal. This was later moved to the Landsford Canal site by State Dept. of Parks and Tourism.
- Location: Chester & Lancaster counties, South Carolina, USA
- Nearest city: Lancaster, South Carolina
- Coordinates: 34°46′44″N 80°52′40″W
- Area: 660 acres (270 ha)
- Built: 1820–1823
- Architect: Robert Mills
- Engineer: Robert Leckie
- NRHP reference No.: 69000163
- Added to NRHP: December 3, 1969

The Landsford Canal is a navigation channel that opened in 1823 with the purpose of bypassing rapids along the Catawba River to allow efficient freight transport and quick travel between nearby communities and settlements across the rural frontiers of the era. It had five locks operating over a stretch of two miles (3.2 km) with an elevation change overall of 32–34 feet (9.8–10.4 m). It was part of the inland navigation system from the 'Up Country' to Charleston, built systematically from 1819, and the navigations are today the centerpiece of Canal State Park:

The Canal State Park consists of three sets of locks, a mill site, miller's house, and a lockkeeper's house—all in various forms of decay and ruins.

— South Carolina Department of Archives and History, South Carolina Department of Parks and Tourism Landsford Canal, Chester County

The Landsford Canal was the furthest upstream of a series of river boat navigations built in the 1810s and 1820s by Irish masons under the direction of master contractor Robert Leckie of Scotland – canals built on the Western North Carolina Catawba River and South Carolina Wateree Rivers to provide a direct water route between the upstate settlements and the towns along the Fall Line. River transport being far superior to road transport on the crude, oft muddy tracks that sufficed as roads. It is along a two-mile (3.2 km) stretch of the Catawba River in Chester County and Lancaster County west of Lancaster where the fall of the river created a shallow water crossing, a ford named for an early settler who owned the land around the Catawba River, Thomas Land. The lock keeper's house and the canal with three locks is the centerpiece of the Landsford Canal State Park.

== History ==
The canal was designed by Robert Mills. Construction began in 1820, using Irish laborers from the northern United States under the supervision of Robert Leckie. It was 2 miles (3.2 km) long, 12 feet (3.7 m) wide and 10 feet (3.0 m) deep. It had five locks for the 32-foot (9.8 m) descent of the river.

The canal was not a financial success. In 1824, one of the locks collapsed due to a poor foundation. Canal traffic, which was never high, had apparently ceased by 1840. The granite locks and the lock keeper's house survive.

The Landsford Canal was listed on the National Register of Historic Places in 1969. Additional pictures, architectural drawings, and information about the lock keeper's house are available from the Historic American Buildings Survey at the Library of Congress. The documentation indicates the lock keeper's house at Landsford Canal was moved from Rocky Mount Canal near Great Falls downstream.

== See also ==
- List of canals in the United States
