= South Carolina Highway 274 =

State highway in South Carolina, United States

South Carolina Highway 274

Route information
- Maintained by SCDOT
- Length: 17.537 mi (28.223 km)
- Existed: 1937–present

Major junctions
- West end: NC 274 at the North Carolina state line near Gastonia, NC
- SC 49 near Lake Wylie
- East end: SC 322 in Rock Hill

Location
- Country: United States
- State: South Carolina
- Counties: York

Highway system
- South Carolina State Highway System; Interstate; US; State; Scenic
← SC 269	→ US 276

South Carolina Highway 274 (SC 274) is a 17.537-mile (28.223 km) primary state highway in the U.S. state of South Carolina. It connects the cities of Rock Hill and Gastonia, North Carolina. Though it travels generally in a north–south direction, it is signed west–east.

== Route description ==
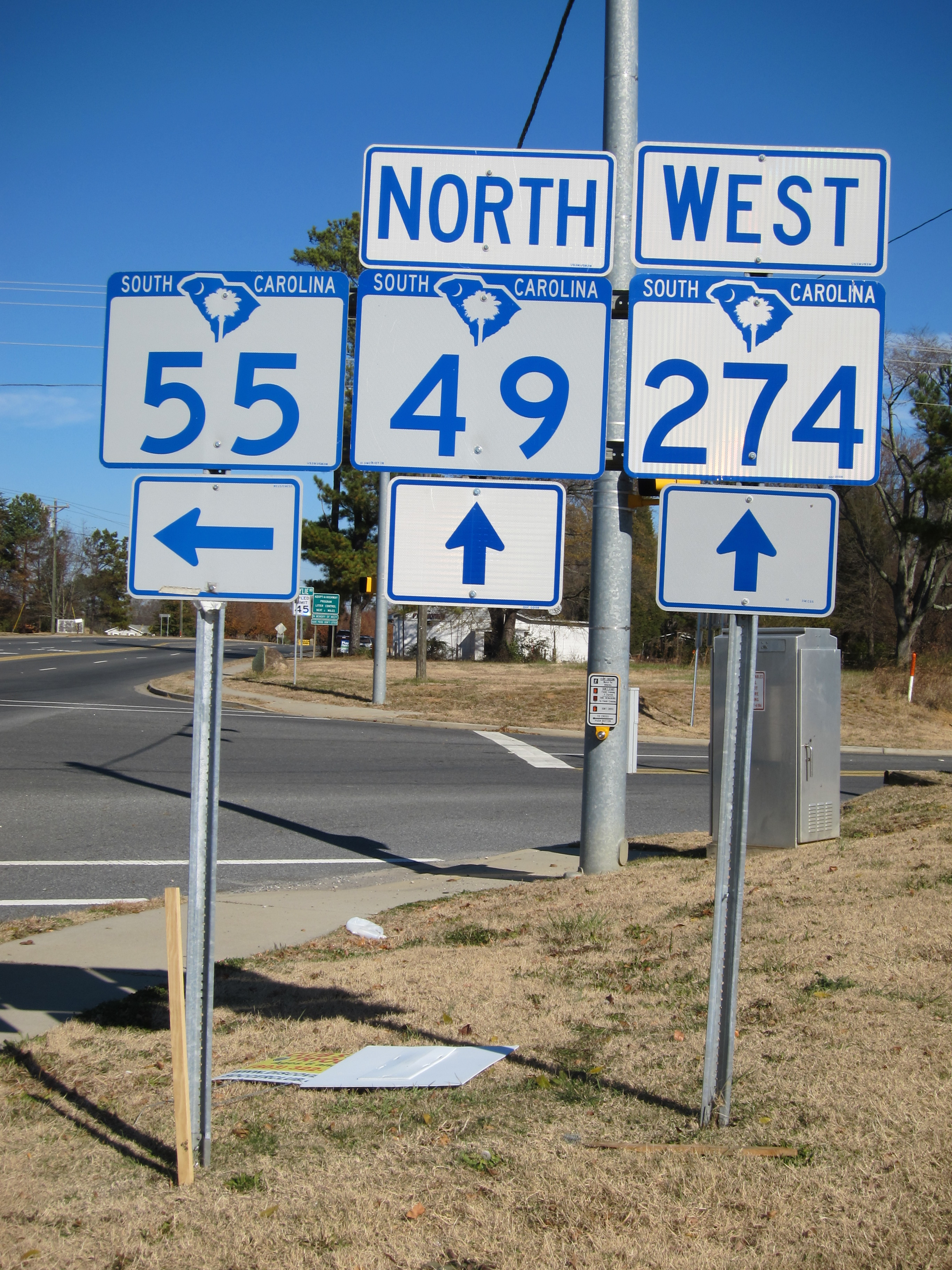
SC 49/55/274 in Lake Wylie.

SC 274 is mostly a four-lane suburban highway that traverses 17.6 miles (28.3 km), from the North Carolina state line, where the road continues north as North Carolina Highway 274 (NC 274), to downtown Rock Hill at SC 322.

== History ==
Established in 1937 as a renumbering of SC 58 to match NC 274, it originally traveled from SC 49 to the North Carolina state line. In 1939, it was extended south to SC 5 (now SC 161), traveling concurrently with SC 49. In 1942, the entire route was fully paved. Between 1959 and 1961, SC 274 was extended south again to its current southern terminus on Cherry Road in Rock Hill.

== Major intersections ==
The entire route is in York County.

Location	mi	km	Destinations	Notes
	0.000	0.000	NC 274 north (Union Road) – Gastonia	Continuation into North Carolina
Lake Wylie	2.597	4.179	SC 49 north (Charlotte Highway) / SC 557 south – Lake Wylie, Charlotte, Clover	Western end of SC 49 concurrency
	2.797	4.501	SC 55 south / Lake Wylie Road – Clover	Northern terminus of SC 55
	4.847	7.800	SC 49 south (Charlotte Highway) / Bethfields Terrace – York	Eastern end of SC 49 concurrency
Rock Hill	11.907	19.162	SC 161 north (Old York Road) / Adnah Church Road – York	Western end of SC 161 concurrency
Rock Hill	13.447	21.641	SC 901 south (Heckle Boulevard)	Eastbound SC 274 to SC 901 southbound and northbound SC 901 to westbound SC 274 only; northern terminus of SC 901
Rock Hill	14.677	23.620	SC 161 south (Celanese Road) to Bryant Boulevard / I-77	Eastern end of SC 161 concurrency
Rock Hill	17.537	28.223	SC 322 (Cherry Road) / Oakland Avenue	Eastern terminus
1.000 mi = 1.609 km; 1.000 km = 0.621 mi: Concurrency terminus; Incomplete access
