= South Carolina Highway 55 =

State highway in South Carolina, United States

South Carolina Highway 55

Route information
- Maintained by SCDOT
- Length: 20.990 mi (33.780 km)
- Existed: 1931–present

Major junctions
- West end: SC 5 near Kings Creek
- US 321 in Clover
- East end: SC 49 / SC 274 near Lake Wylie

Location
- Country: United States
- State: South Carolina
- Counties: Cherokee, York

Highway system
- South Carolina State Highway System; Interstate; US; State; Scenic
← SC 53	→ SC 56

South Carolina Highway 55 (SC 55) is a 20.990-mile (33.780 km) primary state highway in the U.S. state of South Carolina. It connects the city of Clover to Blacksburg, Rock Hill, and Charlotte, North Carolina.

== Route description ==
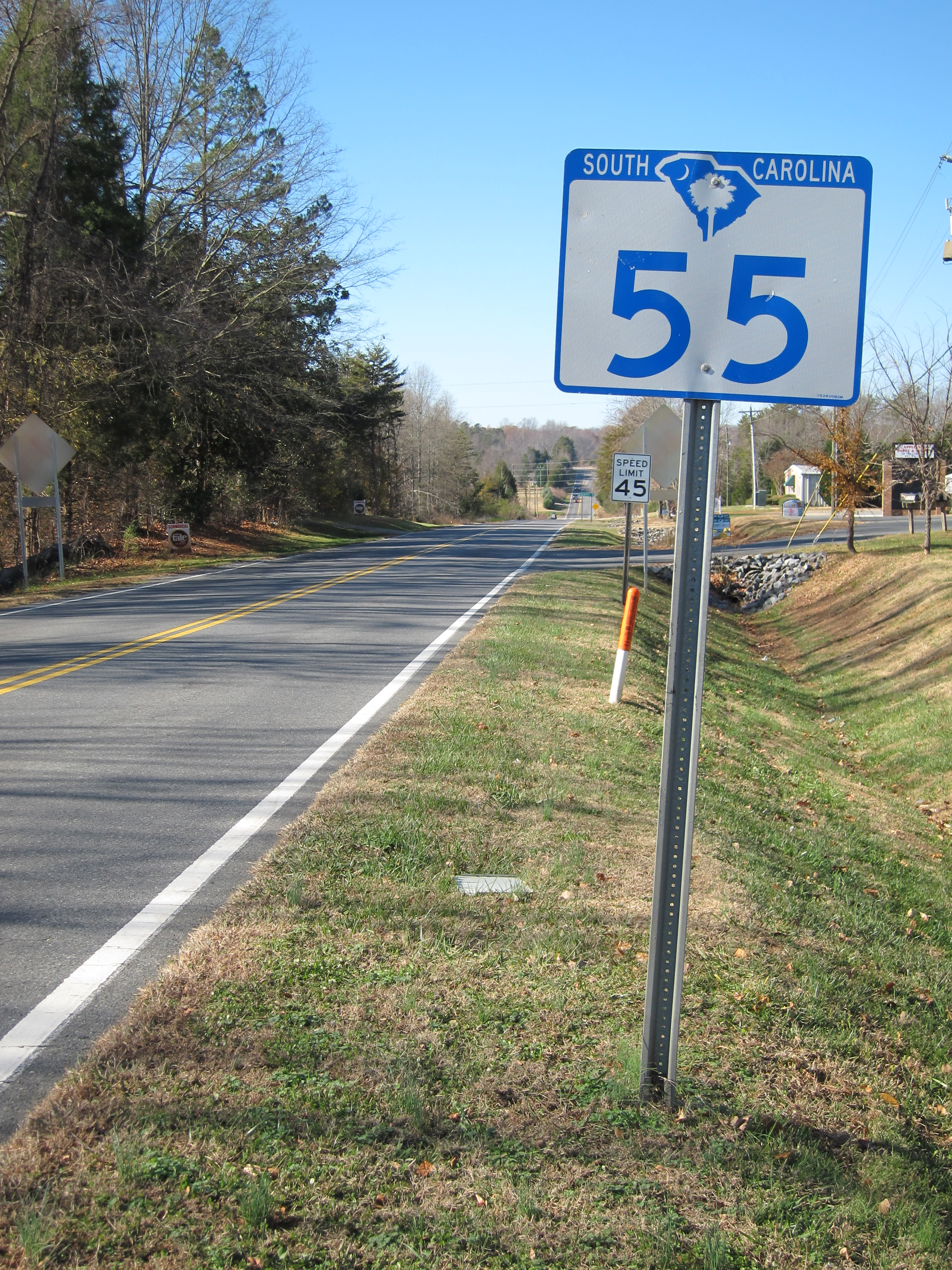
SC 55 heading west, near Lake Wylie

SC 55 is a rural two-lane highway, with a median in and around Clover; between Clover and Lake Wylie, it is also paralleled by a major transmission line. It traverses from SC 5 near Kings Creek, to SC 49/SC 274 near Lake Wylie. Travelers to and from Charlotte would connect through SC 557, just east of Clover.

== History ==
The first SC 55 appeared in either 1925 or 1926 as a new primary routing from SC 21 near Greenwood, to SC 24 in Friendship. By 1930, it was renumbered as part of SC 24; today it is part of U.S. Route 178 (US 178).

The current SC 55 was established in 1931 as a new primary routing from Kings Creek to Lake Wylie. The highway was fully paved by 1942. In 2012, SC 55 was widened with a median through Clover.

== Major intersections ==
County	Location	mi	km	Destinations	Notes
Cherokee	Kings Creek	0.000	0.000	SC 5 – York, Blacksburg	Western terminus
York	Bethany	7.490	12.054	SC 161 – York, Kings Mountain	To Kings Mountain State Park and National Military Park
York	Clover	13.250	21.324	US 321 (Main Street) – York, Gastonia	
York	Clover	15.500	24.945	SC 557 north – Lake Wylie, Charlotte	
York	Lake Wylie	20.990	33.780	SC 49 / SC 274 (Charlotte Highway) – Rock Hill, Gastonia, Charlotte	Eastern terminus
1.000 mi = 1.609 km; 1.000 km = 0.621 mi
