= South Carolina Highway 322 =

Highway in South Carolina

South Carolina Highway 322

Route information
- Maintained by SCDOT
- Length: 28.050 mi (45.142 km)
- Tourist routes: Western York Scenic Byway

Major junctions
- West end: SC 49 near Pinckneyville
- US 321 in McConnells
- East end: US 21 / SC 121 in Rock Hill

Location
- Country: United States
- State: South Carolina
- Counties: York

Highway system
- South Carolina State Highway System; Interstate; US; State; Scenic
| ← US 321 | → SC 324 |

South Carolina Highway 322 (SC 322) is a 28.050-mile-long (45.142 km) state highway in the U.S. state of South Carolina. The highway travels through mostly rural areas of York County.

== Route description ==
View west along SC 322 in Rock Hill

SC 322 begins at an intersection with SC 49 (Lockhart Road) east-northeast of Pinckneyville, York County. It travels to the northeast and curves to the east-southeast and intersects SC 97. It crosses over Blue Branch and Turkey Creek. It winds its way to the east and enters McConnells. There, it has a very brief concurrency with U.S. Route 321 (US 321; Chester Highway) in town. It travels to the north of Draper Wildlife Management Area. The highway crosses over South Fork Fishing Creek and Stony Fork before intersecting SC 324. There is a crossing of Fishing Creek. It travels to the east-northeast and enters Rock Hill. Then, it crosses Tools Creek. It travels to the east and crosses Wildcat Creek just before an intersection with SC 5/SC 901 (Heckle Boulevard). Then, it curves to the northeast and intersects the southern terminus of SC 5 Conn. (West Main Street). It passes Rock Hill School District Number Three Stadium and Winthrop University. At Oakland Avenue, on the northeastern edge of the university, it intersects the eastern terminus of SC 274. About two blocks later, it passes a U.S. Post Office and Winthrop Park. A few blocks later, it goes by Cherry Park and Sullivan Middle School. A few blocks after passing the Rock Hill Water Filter Plant, it meets its eastern terminus, an intersection with US 21 and SC 121 (Anderson Road/Cherry Road).

== Major intersections ==
The entire route is in York County.

| Location | mi | km | Destinations | Notes |
|---|---|---|---|---|
| | 0.000 | 0.000 | SC 49 (Lockhart Road) – Union, York | Western terminus |
| | 2.690 | 4.329 | SC 97 – Chester | |
| McConnells | 11.730 | 18.878 | US 321 south (Chester Highway) – Chester | Western end of US 321 concurrency |
| McConnells | 11.820 | 19.022 | US 321 north (Chester Highway) – York, Clover | Eastern end of US 321 concurrency |
| | 18.430 | 29.660 | SC 324 – York | |
| Rock Hill | 23.290 | 37.482 | SC 5 / SC 901 (Heckle Boulevard) – York Tech, Clinton College, Newport | |
| Rock Hill | 24.230 | 38.994 | SC 5 Conn. north (West Main Street) | Southern terminus of SC 5 Conn. |
| Rock Hill | 25.080 | 40.362 | SC 274 west (Oakland Avenue) | Eastern terminus of SC 274 |
| Rock Hill | 28.050 | 45.142 | US 21 (Anderson Road / Cherry Road) / SC 121 south | Eastern terminus, northern terminus of SC 121 |
1.000 mi = 1.609 km; 1.000 km = 0.621 mi: Concurrency terminus
