= Cahaba River National Wildlife Refuge =

National Wildlife Refuge in Alabama, US

- IUCN category IV (habitat/species management area)
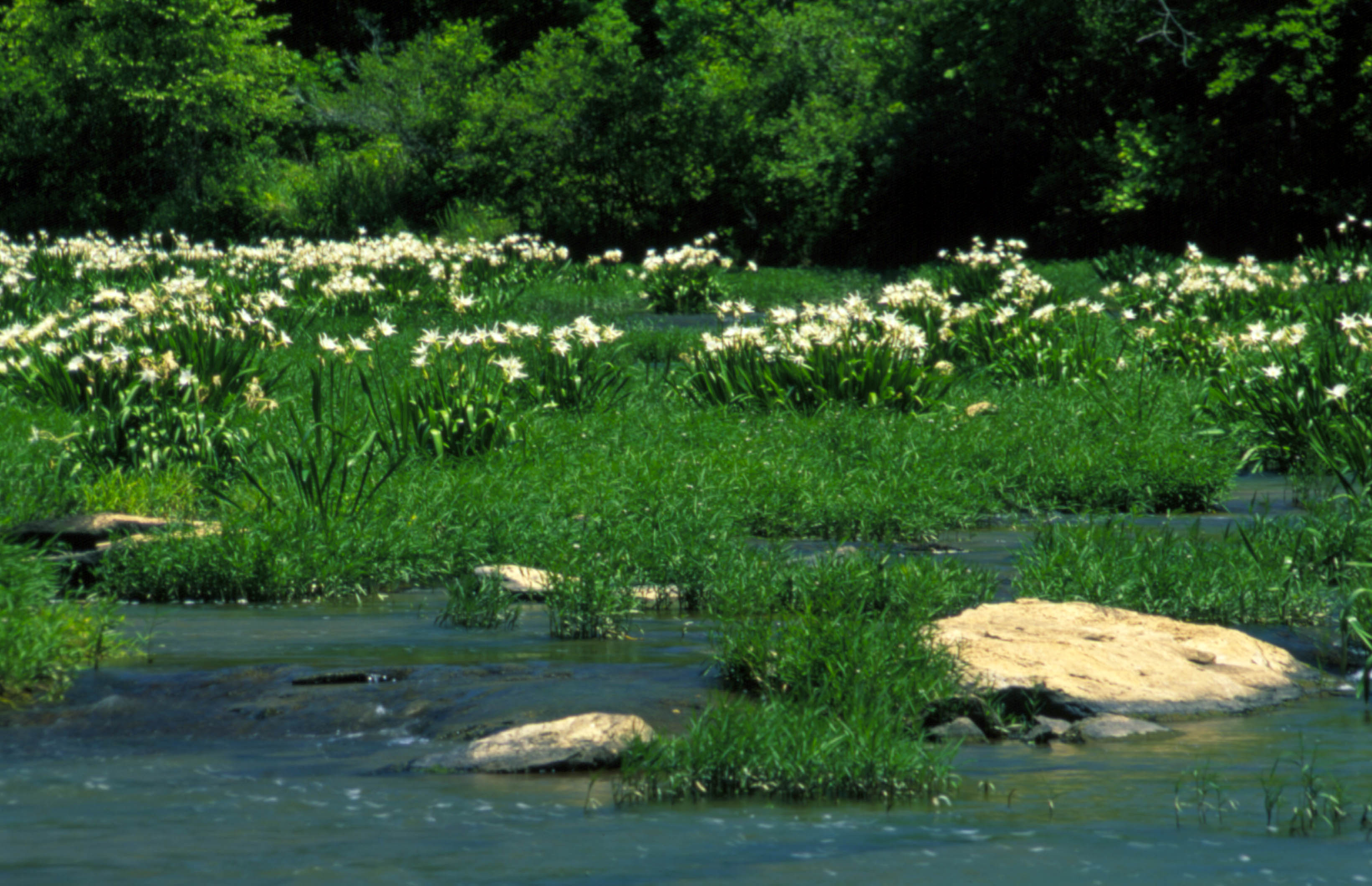
- Cahaba lilies in bloom along the river within the refuge.

- Location within the United States
- Location: Bibb County, Alabama, United States
- Nearest city: West Blocton, Alabama
- Coordinates: 33°2′31.9920″N 87°4′35.0040″W
- Area: 3,689.63 acres (15 km^{2})
- Established: 2002
- Governing body: U.S. Fish and Wildlife Service
- Website: Cahaba River NWR

The Cahaba River National Wildlife Refuge is a 3,689.63 acres (15 km^{2}) National Wildlife Refuge located in central Alabama, along the Cahaba River downstream from Birmingham, Alabama. The refuge was established on September 25, 2002. Additional purchases were approved that will potentially increase the size of the refuge to 7,300 acres (29.5 km^{2}). Additional negotiations propose an expansion to a potential 280,000 acres (1,100 km^{2}), most of which currently belongs to private landowners. The facility is unstaffed, but is administered by the Mountain Longleaf National Wildlife Refuge in Anniston, Alabama.

The refuge extends from just north of the confluence of the Little Cahaba and Cahaba Rivers to the Piper Bridge in Bibb county, approximately five miles east of West Blocton, Alabama. Approximately 3.5 miles (6 km) of the Cahaba River flow through the refuge. The refuge lies at the far southwestern end of the Appalachian mountain chain.

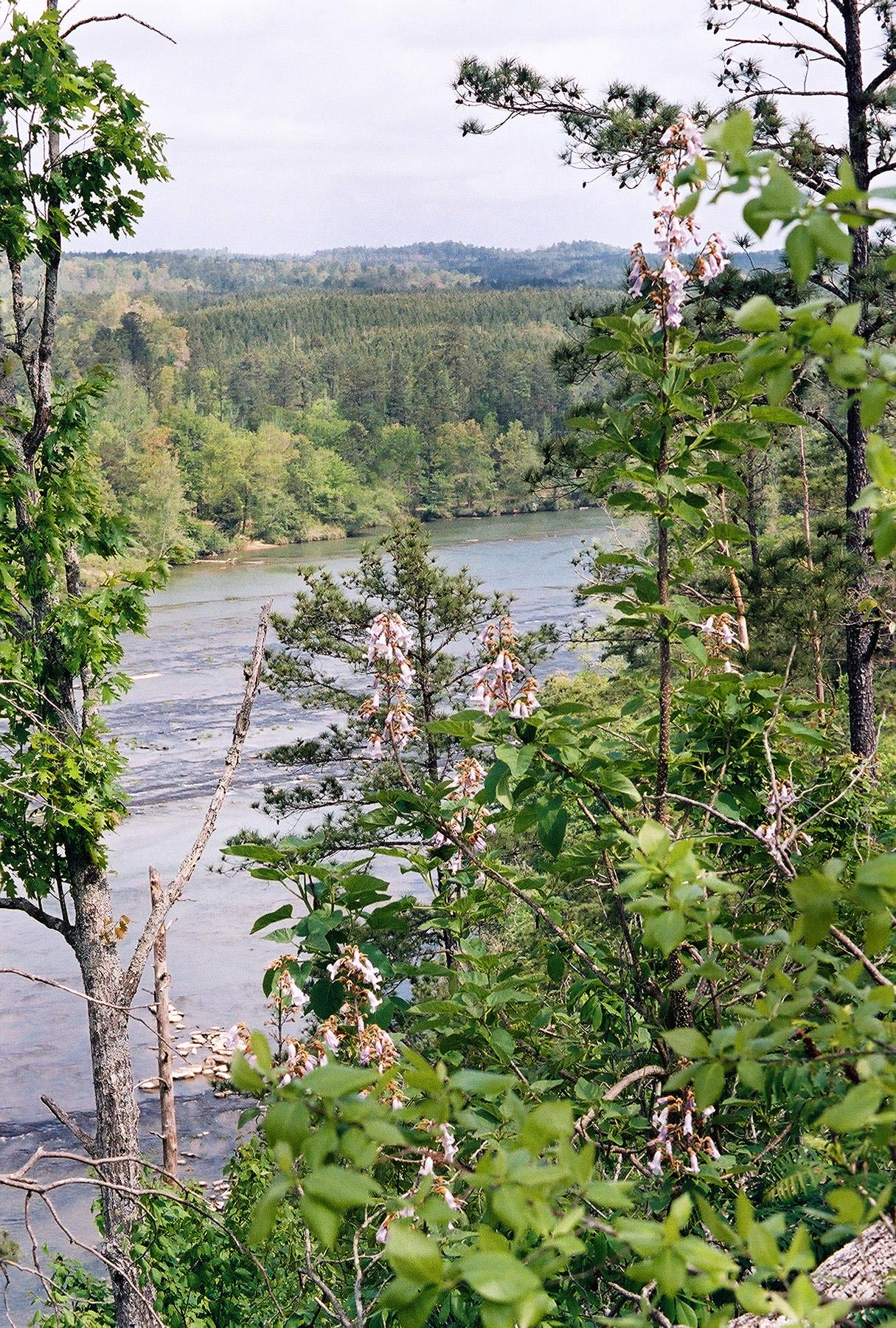
The Cahaba River within the refuge

== Wildlife ==
Cahaba River National Wildlife Refuge is a critical habitat for the endangered Cahaba shiner, goldline darter, round rocksnail, and cylindrical lioplax. There are also 64 other rare plant and animal species within its borders. It is home to Hymenocallis coronaria, a threatened plant species known in Alabama as the Cahaba lily. Its abundant presence here is one of the reasons for the creation of the refuge.

== Facilities ==
The refuge provides opportunities for fishing, canoeing, hiking, photography, and wildlife observation.

== See also ==
- List of National Wildlife Refuges
