= South Carolina Highway 161 =

State highway in South Carolina, United States

South Carolina Highway 161
- SC 161 highlighted in red; SC 161 Bus. highlighted in blue

Route information
- Maintained by SCDOT
- Length: 28.910 mi (46.526 km)
- Existed: 1930–present
- Tourist routes: Western York Scenic Byway

Major junctions
- South end: US 21 in Rock Hill
- I-77 in Rock Hill; US 321 in York
- North end: NC 161 at the North Carolina state line near Bethany

Location
- Country: United States
- State: South Carolina
- Counties: York

Highway system
- South Carolina State Highway System; Interstate; US; State; Scenic
← SC 160	→ SC 162

South Carolina Highway 161 (SC 161) is a 28.910-mile (46.526 km) primary state highway in the U.S. state of South Carolina. It connects the cities of Rock Hill, York, and Kings Mountain, North Carolina.

== Route description ==
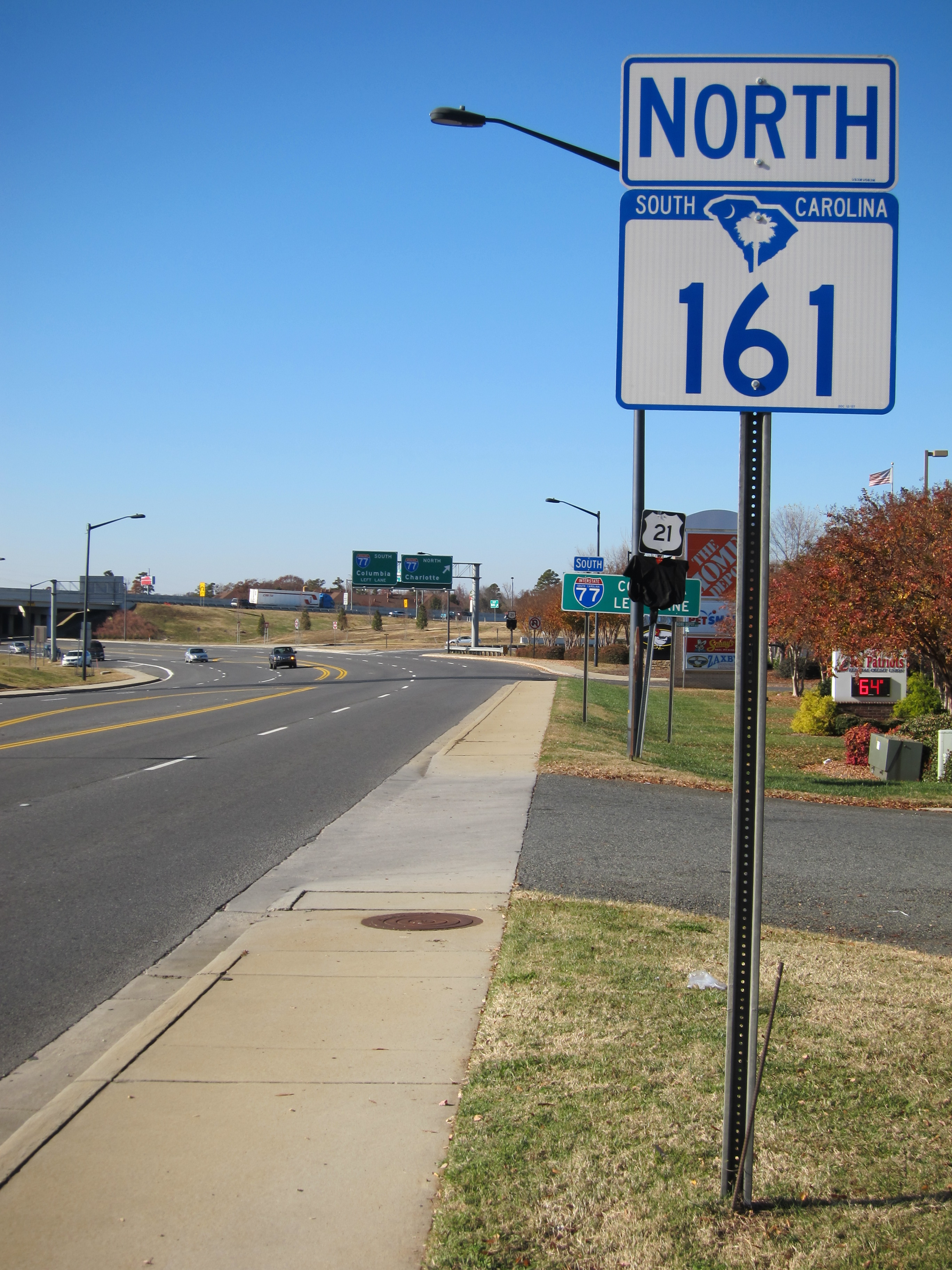
SC 161 Northbound in Rock Hill

SC 161 is a multi-lane highway, traversing from U.S. Route 21 (US 21) and Interstate 77 (I-77), through the northern part of Rock Hill and north around York, to the back entrance area of Kings Mountain State Park and Kings Mountain National Military Park, and ends at the North Carolina state line.

== History ==
The first SC 161 appeared in 1923 as a new primary routing from SC 16 in Eau Claire to SC 22. It was extended northwest by 1926 to SC 7 in Leeds. In 1928, the entire route was renumbered as part of SC 215.

The current SC 161 was established in 1930 as a new primary route, it originally traversed from SC 16 (today US 321) to the North Carolina state line, continuing as North Carolina Highway 215 (renumbered in 1937 to NC 161). In 1959, SC 161 was extended south, through York, to its current southern terminus at US 21 in Rock Hill. In 1986 or 1987, SC 161 was placed on bypass north around York, in concurrency with SC 5.

== Junction list ==
The entire route is in York County.

Location	mi	km	Destinations	Notes
Rock Hill	0.000	0.000	US 21 (Cherry Road) – Fort Mill, Rock Hill	Southern terminus
Rock Hill	0.250	0.402	I-77 – Columbia, Charlotte	I-77 exit 82
Rock Hill	4.260	6.856	SC 274 east (Ebenezer Road)	Southern end of SC 274 concurrency
Rock Hill	5.800	9.334	SC 901 south (Heckle Boulevard)	Northern terminus of SC 901
Rock Hill	7.030	11.314	SC 274 west (Hands Mill Highway) – Lake Wylie, Gastonia	Southern end of SC 274 concurrency
York	13.230	21.292	SC 5 south / SC 5 Bus. north / SC 161 Bus. north – York, Rock Hill	Southern end of SC 5 concurrency; southern terminus of SC 5 Bus. and SC 161 Bus.
York			SC 49 (Charlotte Highway) – York, Charlotte	
York	17.470	28.115	US 321 south / SC 5 north / SC 161 Bus. south – Blacksburg, Chester	Northern end of SC 5 concurrency; southern end of US 321 concurrency; northern terminus of SC 161 Bus.
	19.050	30.658	US 321 north – Clover, Gastonia	Northern end of US 321 concurerncy
Bethany	25.420	40.910	SC 55 – Blacksburg, Clover	
	28.910	46.526	NC 161 north	Continuation beyond North Carolina state line
1.000 mi = 1.609 km; 1.000 km = 0.621 mi: Concurrency terminus

== York business loop ==
South Carolina Highway 161 Business
- Location: York
- Length: 4.460 mi (7.178 km)

South Carolina Highway 161 Business (SC 161 Bus.) is a 4.460-mile (7.178 km) business route in the southeastern and central portions of York, in the central portion of York County. It follows the old alignment of SC 161 through downtown York, via Liberty Street.

The business loop begins at an intersection with SC 5 and SC 161 in the southeastern part of the city. This intersection is also the southern terminus of SC 5 Bus., which begins concurrent with SC 161. They travel to the southeast and pass the York Comprehensive High School. After a brief portion outside the city limits, they curve to the east-northeast. After an intersection with the western terminus of SC 324 (McFarland Road), they curve to the northwest and then enter the main part of the city. Just after they pass the York Public Library, they intersect Roosevelt Street, which leads to the chamber of commerce. One block later, they meet U.S. Route 321 Business (US 321 Bus.) and SC 49 (Congress Street). A short distance later, they meet US 321, where SC 161 Bus. splits off to the north-northeast. The two highways travel through rural areas of the city until they intersect the northern terminus of US 321 Bus. (Kings Mountain Street). Here, US 321 and SC 161 Bus. curve to the north-northwest. Then they intersect SC 5 and SC 161. Here, SC 161 Bus. ends.

The entire route is in York, York County.

mi	km	Destinations	Notes
0.000	0.000	SC 5 north / SC 161 north (Alexander Love Highway) – Clover, Blacksburg, York Comprehensive High School, Floyd D. Johnson Technology Center SC 161 south (Old York Road) – Fort Mill SC 5 south (York Highway) – Rock Hill	Southern end of SC 5 Bus. concurrency; southern terminus of SC 5 Bus. and SC 161 Bus.
1.510	2.430	SC 324 east (McFarland Road)	Western terminus of SC 324
2.530	4.072	US 321 Bus. / SC 49 (Congress Street)	
3.110	5.005	US 321 south / SC 5 Bus. north – Chester	Northern end of SC 5 Bus. concurrency; southern end of US 321 concurrency
4.290	6.904	US 321 Bus. south	Northern terminus of US 321 Bus.
4.460	7.178	SC 5 north (Alexander Love Highway) – Blacksburg US 321 north / SC 161 north – Clover SC 5 south / SC 161 south (Alexander Love Highway) – Rock Hill, York Comprehensive High School, Floyd D. Johnson Technology Center	Northern end of US 321 concurrency; northern terminus
1.000 mi = 1.609 km; 1.000 km = 0.621 mi: Concurrency terminus
