= South Carolina Highway 557 =

State highway in South Carolina, United States

South Carolina Highway 557

Route information
- Maintained by SCDOT
- Length: 6.710 mi (10.799 km)
- Existed: 1942–present

Major junctions
- South end: SC 55 near Clover
- North end: SC 49 / SC 274 in Lake Wylie

Location
- Country: United States
- State: South Carolina
- Counties: York

Highway system
- South Carolina State Highway System; Interstate; US; State; Scenic
← SC 555	→ SC 560

South Carolina Highway 557 (SC 557) is a 6.710-mile (10.799 km) primary state highway in the U.S. state of South Carolina. It serves as a connector route between Clover and Lake Wylie.

== Route description ==
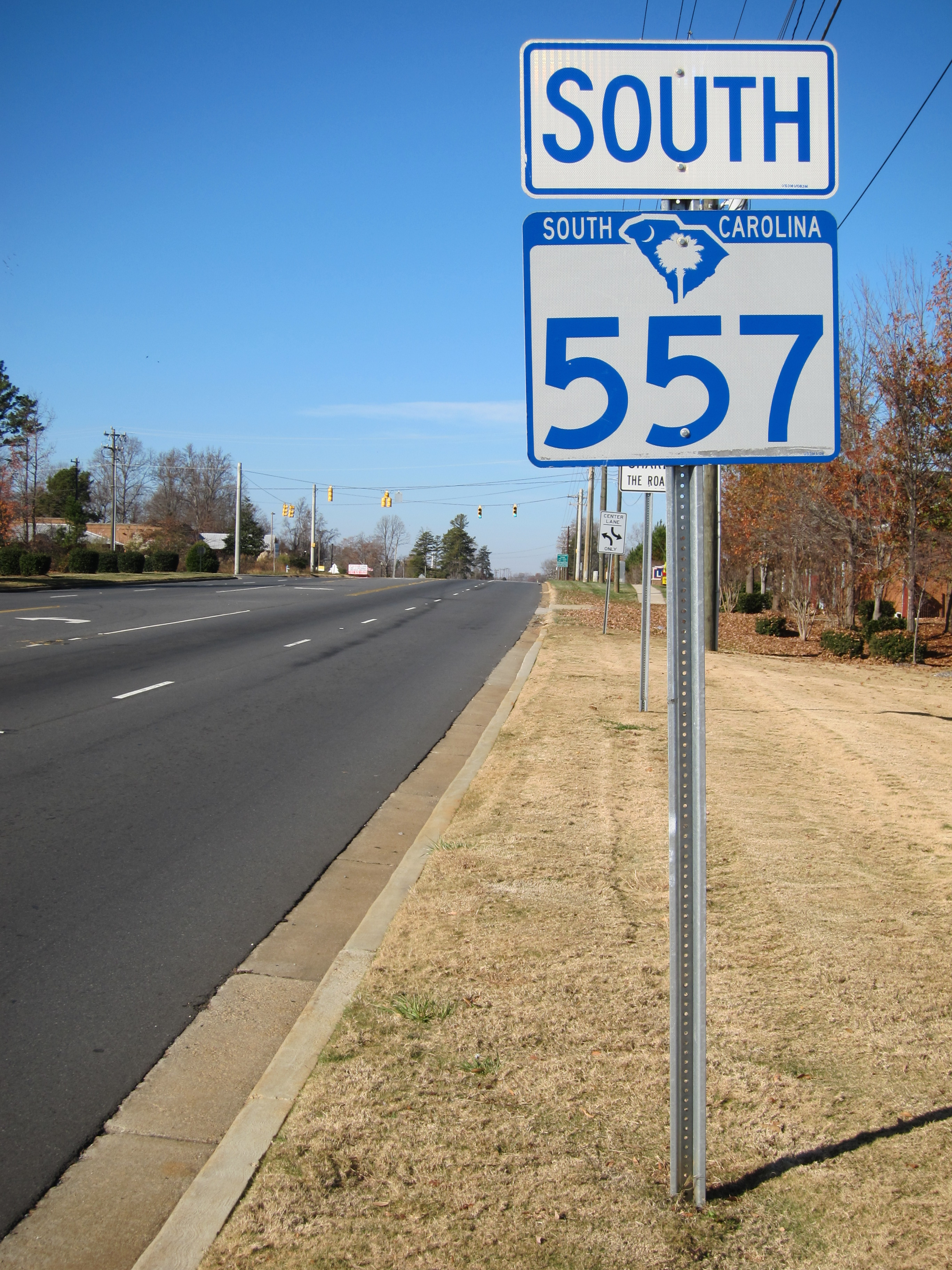
First sign for SC 557 south in Lake Wylie

SC 557 is a two-lane rural highway that traverses 6.7 miles (10.8 km) from SC 55 near Clover to SC 49/SC 274 in Lake Wylie. The highway provides travelers a more direct route to and from Charlotte. Though it runs physically west-to-east, it is signed as a north–south highway with its western end as its southern terminus and vice versa.

== History ==
The highway was established in 1942 as a renumbering of SC 59. The route has changed a little since.

== Major intersections ==
The entire route is in York County.

Location	mi	km	Destinations	Notes
Clover	0.000	0.000	SC 55 – Clover, Rock Hill	Southern terminus
Lake Wylie	6.710	10.799	SC 49 / SC 274 (Charlotte Highway) – Rock Hill, Gastonia, Charlotte	Northern terminus
1.000 mi = 1.609 km; 1.000 km = 0.621 mi
