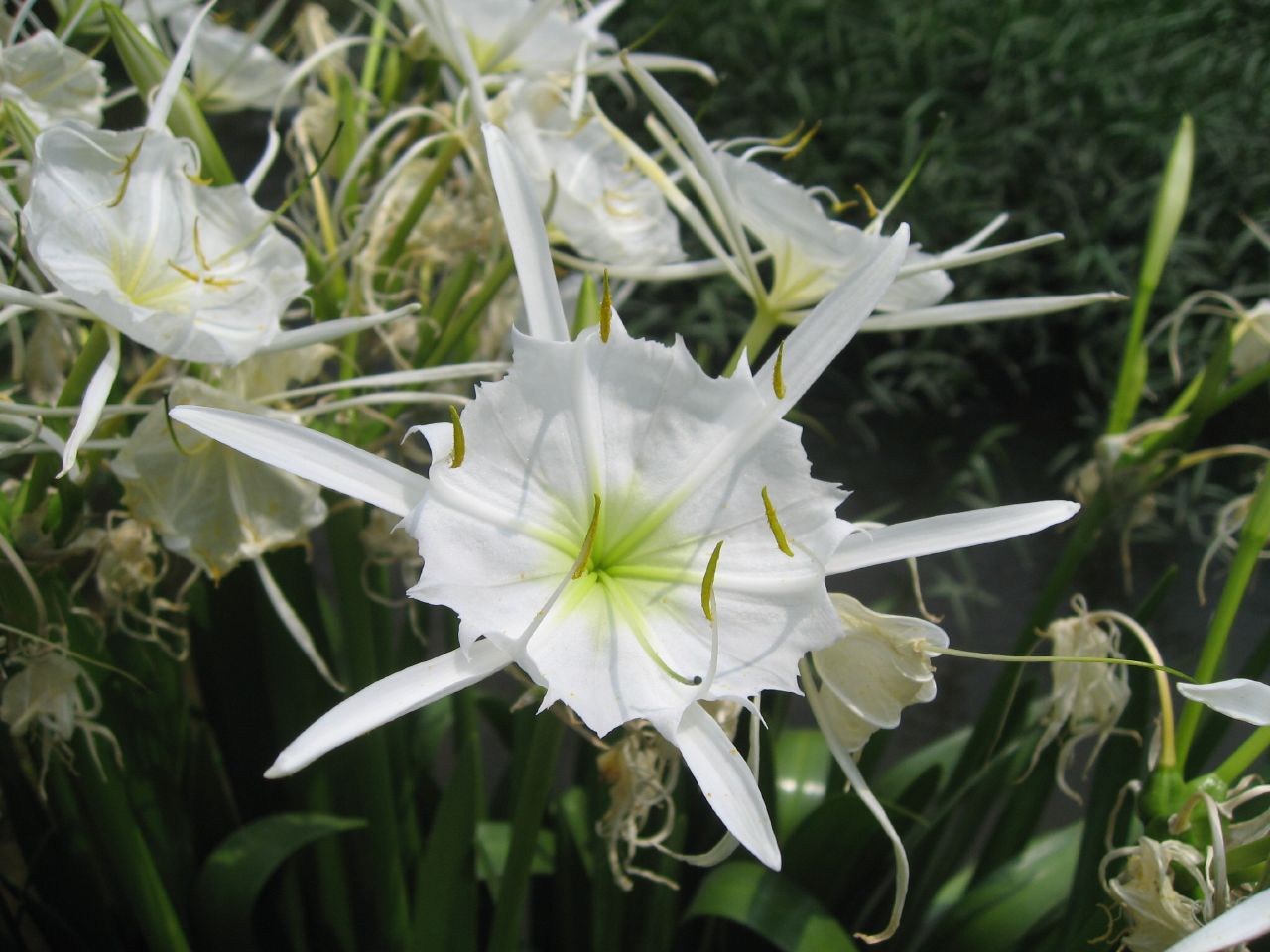

Conservation status
- Vulnerable (NatureServe)

Scientific classification
- Kingdom: Plantae
- Clade: Tracheophytes
- Clade: Angiosperms
- Clade: Monocots
- Order: Asparagales
- Family: Amaryllidaceae
- Subfamily: Amaryllidoideae
- Genus: Hymenocallis
- Species: H. coronaria

Binomial name
- Hymenocallis coronaria (Leconte) Kunth

Synonyms
- Tomodon coronarium Raf.; Pancratium coronarium Leconte

= Hymenocallis coronaria =

Species of aquatic plant

Hymenocallis coronaria, commonly known as the Cahaba lily, shoal lily, or shoals spider-lily, is an aquatic, perennial flowering plant species of the genus Hymenocallis. It is endemic to the Southeastern United States, being found only in Alabama, Georgia, and South Carolina. Within Alabama, it is known as the Cahaba lily; elsewhere it is known as the Shoal lily or Shoals spider-lily.

== Description and habitat ==
Hymenocallis coronaria requires a swift, shallow, water current and direct sunlight to flourish. The plant grows to about 3 feet (0.9 m) tall and develops from a bulb that lodges in cracks in rocky shoals. It blooms from early May to late June. Each fragrant flower blossom opens overnight and lasts for one day. They are visited and possibly pollinated by Paratrea plebeja, commonly known as the plebeian sphinx moth, and Battus philenor, the pipevine swallowtail butterfly.

The plant was first observed in 1773 by William Bartram and described as the "odoriferous Pancratium fluitans which almost alone possesses the little rocky islets". He saw it growing in the Savannah River near Augusta, Georgia.

== Populations ==
Hymenocallis coronaria is under consideration for protection under the Endangered Species Act, due to entire populations being wiped out by dam construction. There are only approximately 50 extant populations of Hymenocallis coronaria left, all in the states of Alabama, Georgia, and South Carolina. The three largest remaining populations are located in the Cahaba River in Alabama, the Catawba River in South Carolina, and in the Flint River in Georgia. The Cahaba River has four separate populations, with three within the Cahaba River National Wildlife Refuge and one in Buck Creek); the Catawba has one within the Landsford Canal State Park; and the Flint has four, from Pasley Shoals to Snipe Shoals. Significant populations remain in the Savannah River basin, with three in the main channel and one each in the tributaries of Stevens Creek in South Carolina and the Broad River in Georgia. Efforts are currently underway to establish populations along the Chattahoochee River along the whitewater course in Columbus. The project involves collecting seeds from native stands along a section of Flat Shoals Creek, a tributary to the Chattahoochee. Seeds are collected and germinated, and then grown to establish hardy root systems. After a year they are planted along the river in areas where habitat is prime.

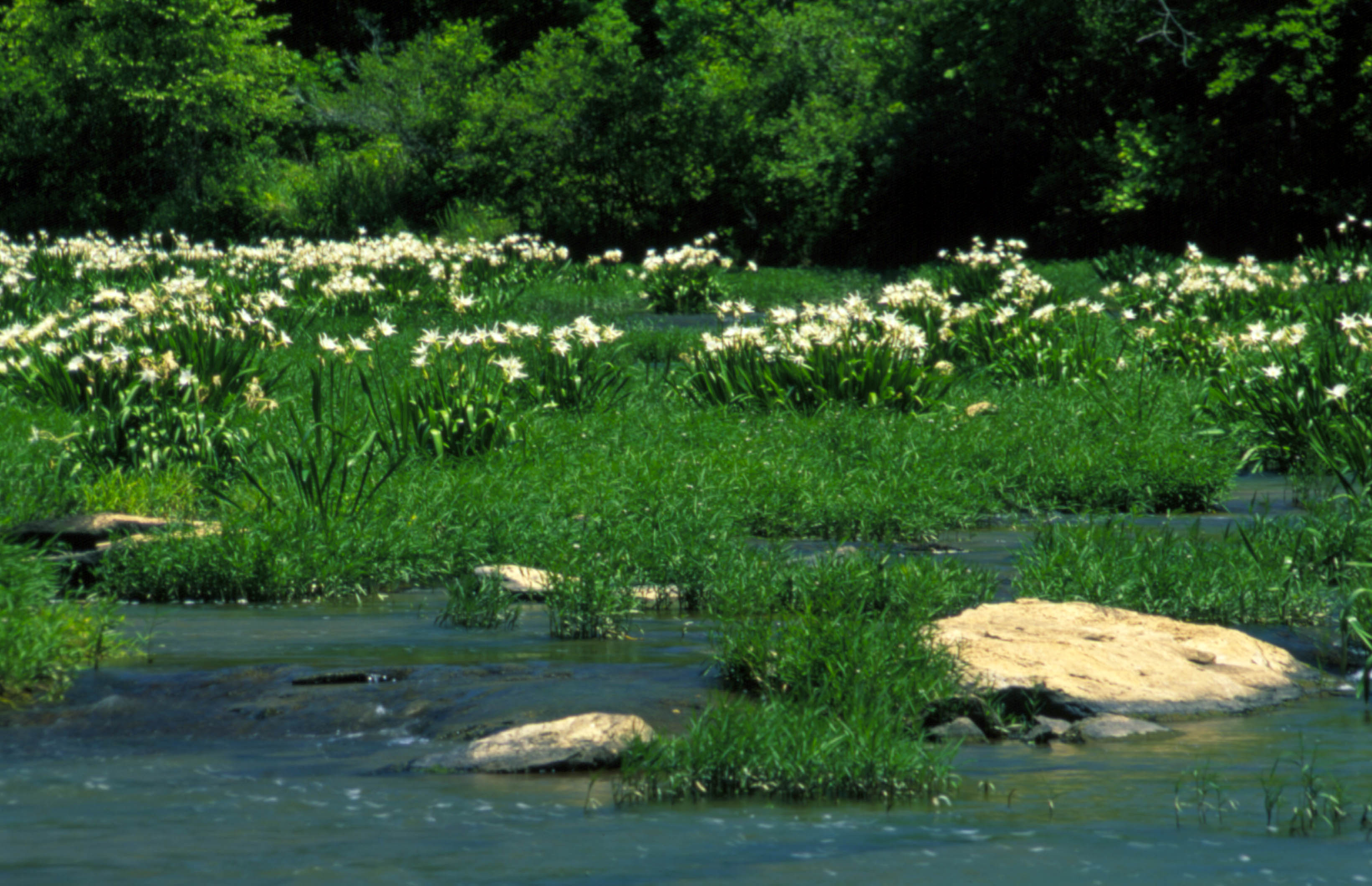
A stand of H. coronaria in the Cahaba River in Alabama
