= Fort Lawn, South Carolina =

Fort Lawn, South Carolina Fort's Lawn
- Town
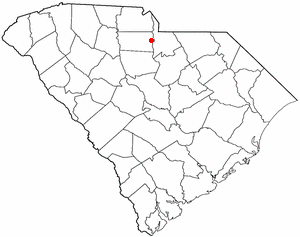
- Location of Fort Lawn, South Carolina
- Coordinates: 34°42′01″N 80°53′57″W
- Country: United States
- State: South Carolina
- County: Chester
- Incorporated: 1887

Area
  - Total: 1.39 sq mi (3.61 km^{2})
  - Land: 1.39 sq mi (3.61 km^{2})
  - Water: 0 sq mi (0.00 km^{2})
- Elevation: 522 ft (159 m)

Population (2020)
  - Total: 962
  - Density: 690.8/sq mi (266.73/km^{2})
- Time zone: UTC-5 (Eastern (EST))
  - Summer (DST): UTC-4 (EDT)
- ZIP code: 29714
- Area codes: 803, 839
- FIPS code: 45-26845
- GNIS feature ID: 2406508

Fort Lawn is a town in eastern Chester County, South Carolina. As of the 2020 census, Fort Lawn had a population of 962.

== History ==
John A. G. Walker owned a 1,000-acre (400 ha) plantation in Chester County. After Walker died in the 1870s, his widow wanted a town built, which would be named Walkerville. She offered the Chester and Cheraw Railroad land to build a line through the proposed town, which they did. The Walkers' daughter married a Dr. Fort, who had a large home with a lawn next to the railroad. The story is that the railroad's conductor would say, "Everybody off for Fort's Lawn!"

After Southern Power built a dam in 1907, the nearby town of Great Falls saw considerably more growth than Fort Lawn. In 1959, area leaders worked to attract industry, and over the next three years, companies including Springs Industries spent $18 million.

== Geography ==
Fort Lawn is in eastern Chester County about 2 miles (3 km) west of the Catawba River. U.S. Route 21 passes through the town, leading north 20 miles (32 km) to Rock Hill and south 9 miles (14 km) to Great Falls. South Carolina Highway 9 crosses US 21 in the center of Fort Lawn, leading east across the Catawba River 8 miles (13 km) to Lancaster and west 10 miles (16 km) to Interstate 77 north of Richburg.

Fort Lawn has a total area of 1.4 square miles (3.6 km^{2}), all of it land.

== Demographics ==
Historical population
| Census | Pop. | Note | %± |
|---|---|---|---|
| 1900 | 126 | | — |
| 1910 | 204 | | 61.9% |
| 1920 | 231 | | 13.2% |
| 1930 | 180 | | −22.1% |
| 1940 | 168 | | −6.7% |
| 1950 | 216 | | 28.6% |
| 1960 | 192 | | −11.1% |
| 1970 | 510 | | 165.6% |
| 1980 | 471 | | −7.6% |
| 1990 | 718 | | 52.4% |
| 2000 | 864 | | 20.3% |
| 2010 | 895 | | 3.6% |
| 2020 | 962 | | 7.5% |
U.S. Decennial Census

=== 2020 census ===
Fort Lawn racial composition
| Race | Num. | Perc. |
|---|---|---|
| White (non-Hispanic) | 557 | 57.9% |
| Black or African American (non-Hispanic) | 329 | 34.2% |
| Native American | 3 | 0.31% |
| Asian | 3 | 0.31% |
| Pacific Islander | 1 | 0.1% |
| Other/Mixed | 56 | 5.82% |
| Hispanic or Latino | 13 | 1.35% |

As of the 2020 United States census, there were 962 people, 358 households, and 242 families residing in the town.

=== 2000 census ===
As of the census of 2000, there were 864 people, 326 households, and 227 families residing in the town. The population density was 626.0 inhabitants per square mile (241.7/km^{2}). There were 348 housing units at an average density of 252.1 per square mile (97.3/km^{2}). The racial makeup of the town was 67.13% White, 30.44% African American, 1.04% Native American, 0.23% Asian, 0.69% from other races, and 0.46% from two or more races. Hispanic or Latino of any race were 1.39% of the population.

There were 326 households, of which 38.7% had children under the age of 18 living with them, 45.1% were married couples living together, 21.2% had a female householder with no husband present, and 30.1% were non-families. 25.2% of all households were made up of individuals, and 6.4% had someone living alone who was 65 years of age or older. The average household size was 2.65, and the average family size was 3.14.

In the town, the population was spread out, with 29.3% under the age of 18, 11.3% from 18 to 24, 33.3% from 25 to 44, 19.1% from 45 to 64, and 6.9% who were 65 years of age or older. The median age was 30 years. For every 100 females, there were 89.9 males. For every 100 females age 18 and over, there were 86.3 males.

The median income for a household in the town was $35,694, and the median income for a family was $36,042. Males had a median income of $30,882 versus $20,813 for females. The per capita income for the town was $14,463. About 15.6% of families and 15.8% of the population were below the poverty line, including 22.8% of those under age 18 and 25.7% of those age 65 or over.

== Places of interest ==
Landsford Canal State Park, home of the world's largest population of Rocky Shoals spider lilies, is 9 miles (14 km) north of the town.

The Fort Lawn Community Center hosts various events throughout the year. It is home to a 9/11 memorial constructed from pieces of a steel beam removed from the World Trade Center site.
