= Landsford Canal State Park =

State park in South Carolina, United States

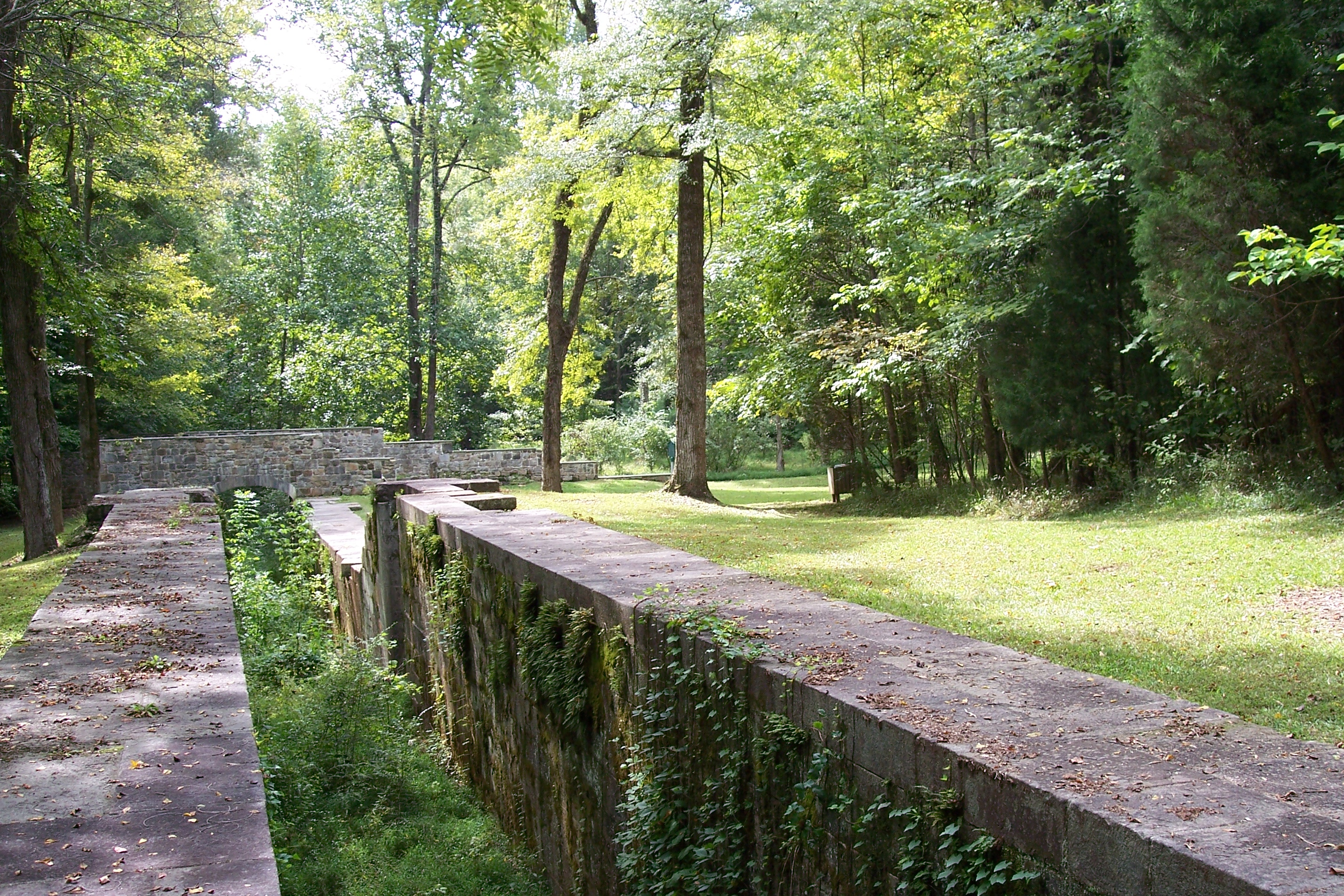
- Old Lock at Southern end of the canal
- Interactive map of Landsford Canal State Park
- Nearest city: Chester, South Carolina
- Coordinates: 34°47′19″N 80°52′43″W
- Area: 448 acres (181.3 ha)
- Camp sites: None
- Hiking trails: Interpretative Canal Trail
- Other information: Picnic shelters, bird watching, canoeing, fishing

Landsford Canal State Park is a South Carolina state park in Chester County, two miles (3.2 km) from US 21. The 448-acre (1.81 km^{2}) park contains the ruins of the Landsford Canal built using slave labor to bypass rapids on the Catawba River between 1820 and 1825. The coming of the railroad caused the canal to be abandoned. The former lock keeper's house contains an interpretive museum. In addition to the canal, visitors also can see one of the largest remaining stands of Hymenocallis coronaria, the Shoals spider-lily, that grows in the shoals of the river and blooms from mid-May to mid-June. The park offers hiking, picnicking, boating, and fishing, as well as a playground.

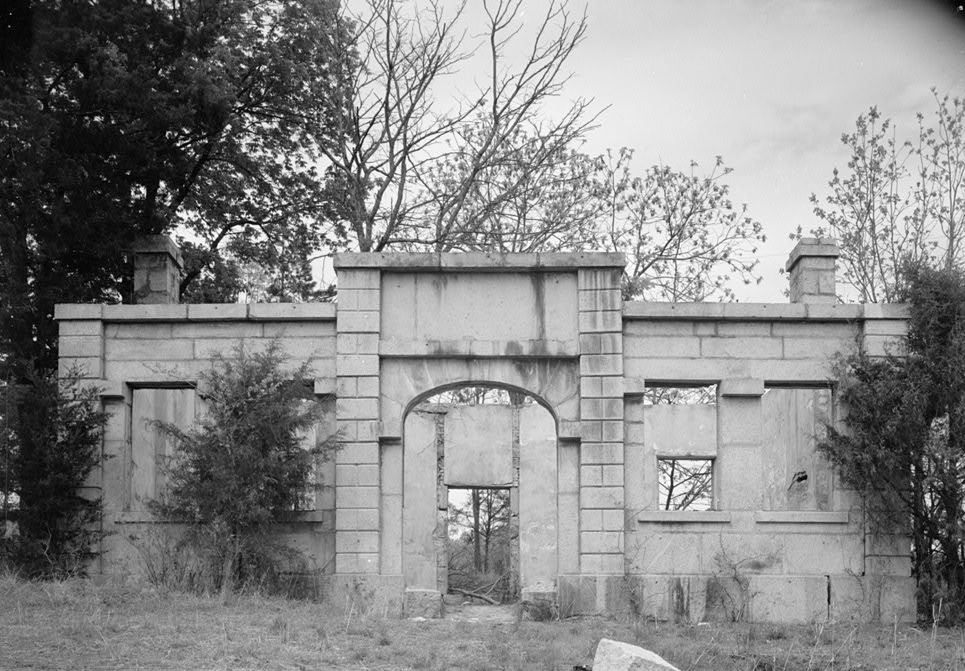
Landsford Canal Lock Keeper's House

== Trails ==
Name	Length	Difficulty
Canal Trail	1.5 miles	Easy
Nature Trail	0.6 miles	Easy
Eagle Point Trail	0.2 miles	Easy

There are three trails, all of which originate at the picnic area.

The Canal Trail is the most popular trail and follows the Landsford Canal. Some original stonework and locks remain, and there are markers along the trail with illustrations of the original bridges and canals with information on the construction of the canal and its impact on the region.

The Nature Trail follow a stretch of the Catawba River, ending at a viewing area to see the Rocky Shoals Spider Lilies.

The Eagle Point Trail is the shortest of the trails and ends at a bluff overlooking the Catawba River.

Each of the trails has unique attributes, and hikers can expect to see frogs, turtles, snakes, and a variety of birds including a pair of resident bald eagles.
