= South Carolina Highway 62 =

South Carolina Highway 62 may refer to:

- South Carolina Highway 62 (1920s–1930s), a former state highway near Charleston
- South Carolina Highway 62 (1940s), a former state highway from near Ballentine to St. Andrews
