= South Carolina Highway 157 =

State highway in South Carolina, United States

South Carolina Highway 157

Route information
- Maintained by SCDOT
- Length: 10.210 mi (16.431 km)

Major junctions
- South end: SC 346 near Catarrh
- North end: SC 157 Truck / SC 341 / SC 341 Truck in Kershaw

Location
- Country: United States
- State: South Carolina
- Counties: Kershaw, Lancaster

Highway system
- South Carolina State Highway System; Interstate; US; State; Scenic
← SC 154	→ SC 160

South Carolina Highway 157 (SC 157) is a 10.210-mile-long (16.431 km) state highway in the Sandhills region of the U.S. state of South Carolina. Though it physically travels west to east, it is signed as a north–south highway. Its southern terminus (eastern end) is at SC 346 about two miles (3.2 km) west of Catarrh. Its northern terminus (western end) is at SC 341 in Kershaw. This is also the southern terminus of SC 157 Truck and SC 341 Truck.

== Route description ==
SC 157 begins at an intersection with Marion Street and Minor Street in eastern Kershaw. From this point, SC 341 travels west on Marion Street and south on Minor Street while SC 157 Truck / SC 341 Truck head north along Minor Street. SC 157 travels east along Marion Street through the eastern reaches of the town passing some houses. It curves to due east and exits the town limits where it passes through a forest of pine trees. The highway crosses the county line at the Little Lynches River where it continues east passing a few houses and churches whilst mostly in a wooded area with some rolling hills. At the community of Mount Pisgah, the highway passes in front of the Mount Pisgah Elementary School. It briefly dips to the south before heading to the northeast where SC 157 ends at a stop-controlled intersection with SC 346, about 3/4 mile (1.2 km) south of its terminus at SC 903.

== Major junctions ==
County	Location	mi	km	Destinations	Notes
Kershaw		0.000	0.000	SC 346 (Raleys Mill Road)	Southern terminus
Lancaster	Kershaw	10.210	16.431	SC 341 (East Marion Street / South Minor Street) – Lancaster, Bethune, Bishopville SC 157 Truck / SC 341 Truck north (North Minor Street)	Northern terminus of SC 157; southern terminus of SC 157 Truck and SC 341 Truck
1.000 mi = 1.609 km; 1.000 km = 0.621 mi

== Kershaw truck route ==
South Carolina Highway 157 Truck
- Location: Kershaw, South Carolina
- Length: 1.330 mi (2.140 km)

South Carolina Highway 157 Truck (SC 157 Truck) is a 1.330-mile (2.140 km) truck route for trucks traveling through Kershaw. For its entire length, it is concurrent with SC 341 Truck. Its southern terminus is at the intersection of Marion Street and Minor Street which is also where SR 157 has its southern terminus and SR 341 travels through. As trucks are banned on East Marion Street through Kershaw, the truck route bypasses the downtown area. The highways head north along North Minor Street for three blocks to Hilton Street, which carries U.S. Route 601 (US 601). The northbound directions of the two truck routes travel along southbound US 601 forming a wrong-way concurrency. At North Hampton Street, the highways reach U.S. Route 521 Business (US 521 Bus.) and US 601 Bus. Continuing west along Hilton Street, they cross a railroad track before the truck routes terminate at US 521 (North Matson Street). US 601 from this point continues south along US 521 around the west side of the town.
