= South Carolina Highway 346 =

State highway in South Carolina, United States

South Carolina Highway 346

Route information
- Maintained by SCDOT
- Length: 12.580 mi (20.246 km)

Major junctions
- South end: SC 341 in Bethune
- North end: SC 903 near Catarrh

Location
- Country: United States
- State: South Carolina
- Counties: Kershaw

Highway system
- South Carolina State Highway System; Interstate; US; State; Scenic
← SC 341	→ SC 357

South Carolina Highway 346 (SC 346) is a 12.580-mile (20.246 km) state highway in Kershaw County, in the northern part of the U.S. state of South Carolina. It is a north–south highway traveling between Bethune at SC 341 and SC 903 about two miles (3.2 km) west of Catarrh. Except within Bethune, it travels through rural wooded areas of the Sandhills region of the state.

== Route description ==
SC 346 has its southern terminus at an intersection with SC 341 (Main Street N) in the town of Bethune. It travels northeast along Hampton Street before curving more to the north after one block. After exiting the town, the highway generally parallels the Lynches River whilst traveling in the northeastern section of Kershaw County. Outside of the town, the road passes through mostly pine forests though it also passes in front of some houses and farms. It winds its way around some ponds and passes some churches along its route. Nearing its northern terminus, it heads around the east side of a sand and gravel quarry and intersects SC 157 at its northern terminus. About 3/4 mile (1.2 km) later, SC 346 ends at a four-way intersection with SC 903.

== Major intersections ==
The entire route is in Kershaw County.

Location	mi	km	Destinations	Notes
Bethune	0.000	0.000	SC 341 (Main Street North)	Southern terminus
	11.800	18.990	SC 157 south (Jones Road)	Northern terminus of SC 157
	12.580	20.246	SC 903 (McBee Highway) / Holley Road	Northern terminus
1.000 mi = 1.609 km; 1.000 km = 0.621 mi
