= South Carolina Highway 522 =

State highway in South Carolina, United States

South Carolina Highway 522

Route information
- Maintained by SCDOT
- Length: 29.620 mi (47.669 km)
- Existed: 1949–present

Major junctions
- West end: SC 97 in Liberty Hill
- US 521 in Heath Springs
- East end: NC 522 at the North Carolina state line near Sapps Crossroads

Location
- Country: United States
- State: South Carolina
- Counties: Kershaw, Lancaster

Highway system
- South Carolina State Highway System; Interstate; US; State; Scenic
← US 521	→ I-526

South Carolina Highway 522 (SC 522) is a 29.620-mile (47.669 km) primary state highway in the U.S. state of South Carolina. It serves to connect communities in central Lancaster County.

== Route description ==
SC 522 is a two-lane rural highway, from Liberty Hill to the North Carolina state line, near Sapps Crossroads. It is similar to a Farm-to-market road that it provides no real destination for travelers, but does provides access to farmland in central Lancaster County.

== History ==
Originally established in either 1937 or 1938, it was a new primary route from U.S. Route 521 (US 521) near Heath Springs to North Carolina Highway 9 in Primus. In 1948, it was decommissioned. However, in 1949, it was reestablished along the same route and north to the North Carolina state line. In 1951 or 1952, SC 522 was extended east to its current western terminus in Liberty Hill.

== Major intersections ==
County	Location	mi	km	Destinations	Notes
Kershaw	Liberty Hill	0.000	0.000	SC 97 (John G. Richards Road) – Camden, Great Falls	Southern terminus
Lancaster	Heath Springs	12.310	19.811	US 521 south (Main Street) – Kershaw, Camden	Southern end of US 521 concurrency
Lancaster	Pleasant Hill	14.400	23.175	US 521 north (Kershaw-Camden Highway) – Lancaster	Northern end of US 521 concurrency
Lancaster	Primus	19.640	31.608	SC 903 (Flat Creek Road) – Lancaster	
Lancaster	Buford	24.370	39.220	SC 9 (Pageland Highway) – Lancaster, Pageland	
Lancaster		29.620	47.669	NC 522 north	Continuation beyond North Carolina state line
1.000 mi = 1.609 km; 1.000 km = 0.621 mi: Concurrency terminus
