= South Carolina Highway 58 =

State highway in South Carolina, United States

South Carolina Highway 58

Route information
- Maintained by SCDOT
- Length: 12.520 mi (20.149 km)

Major junctions
- West end: SC 341 in South Lynchburg
- I-95 / SC 53 in Shiloh
- East end: US 301 / US 378 in Turbeville

Location
- Country: United States
- State: South Carolina
- Counties: Lee, Sumter, Clarendon

Highway system
- South Carolina State Highway System; Interstate; US; State; Scenic
← SC 57	→ SC 59

South Carolina Highway 58 (SC 58) is a 12.520-mile-long (20.149 km) state highway in the U.S. state of South Carolina. The highway connects the Lynchburg area with Turbeville, via Shiloh. Though it is designated an east-west highway, it runs north-south.

== Route description ==
SC 58 begins at an intersection with SC 341 (Lynchburg Highway) just southeast of Lynchburg, within Lee County. It travels on a fairly southern direction, enters Sumter County, and has an intersection with SC 53. The highways travel concurrently to the east and have an interchange with Interstate 95 (I-95) on the northwestern edge of Shiloh. Approximately 500 feet (150 m) later, SC 53 splits off toward the northeast, while SC 58 enters Shiloh proper. Upon leaving the city limits of Shiloh, the highway enters Clarendon County. It curves to the southeast and enters Turbeville. There, it meets its eastern terminus, and intersection with U.S. Route 301 (US 301)/US 378 (Main Street). Here, the roadway continues as Gamble Street.

== Major intersections ==
County	Location	mi	km	Destinations	Notes
Lee	South Lynchburg	0.000	0.000	SC 341 (Lynchburg Highway) – Olanta, Lynchburg, Bishopville	
Sumter		5.970	9.608	SC 53 south to US 378	Western end of SC 53 concurrency
Sumter	Shiloh	6.165– 6.220	9.922– 10.010	I-95 – Savannah, Florence	I-95 exit 141
Sumter	Shiloh	6.400	10.300	SC 53 north – Sardis	Eastern end of SC 53 concurrency
Clarendon	Turbeville	12.520	20.149	US 301 / US 378 (Main Street)	
1.000 mi = 1.609 km; 1.000 km = 0.621 mi: Concurrency terminus
