= South Carolina Highway 53 =

State highway in South Carolina, United States

South Carolina Highway 53

Route information
- Maintained by SCDOT
- Length: 11.900 mi (19.151 km)

Major junctions
- South end: US 378 southwest of Shiloh
- I-95 / SC 58 in Shiloh; SC 341 northeast of Shiloh
- North end: SC 403 northeast of Shiloh

Location
- Country: United States
- State: South Carolina
- Counties: Sumter

Highway system
- South Carolina State Highway System; Interstate; US; State; Scenic
← US 52	→ SC 55

South Carolina Highway 53 (SC 53) is a 11.900-mile-long (19.151 km) state highway in the U.S. state of South Carolina. The highway connects Shiloh with rural areas of Sumter County.

== Route description ==
SC 53 begins at an intersection with US 378 (Myrtle Beach Highway) southwest of Shiloh, within Sumter County. It travels to the northeast, through rural areas of the county, and curves to a nearly due east direction. It intersects SC 58 (Pleasant Grove Road), and the two highways begin a concurrency. They have an interchange with Interstate 95 (I-95), where they enter Shiloh. Approximately 500 feet (150 m) later, SC 53 splits off to the south, onto Pudding Swamp Road. SC 53 continues through rural areas of the county to an intersection with SC 341 (Mt. Zion Road). About 2,000 feet (610 m) later is the highway's northern terminus, an intersection with SC 403 (Lynches River Road/Amwell Church Road). This is southwest of the Lynches River.

== Major intersections ==
The entire route is in Sumter County.

Location	mi	km	Destinations	Notes
	0.000	0.000	US 378 (Myrtle Beach Highway) – Turbeville, Sumter	Southern terminus
	5.950	9.576	SC 58 west (Pleasant Grove Road) – Lynchburg	Southern end of SC 58 concurrency
Shiloh	6.145– 6.200	9.889– 9.978	I-95 – Savannah, Florence	I-95 exit 141
Shiloh	6.380	10.268	SC 58 east (Pudding Swamp Road) – Turbeville	Northern end of SC 58 concurrency
	11.510	18.524	SC 341 (Mt. Zion Road) – Lake City, Lynchburg, Bishopville	
	11.900	19.151	SC 403 (Lynches River Road/Amwell Church Road) – Lake City, Sardis	Northern terminus
1.000 mi = 1.609 km; 1.000 km = 0.621 mi: Concurrency terminus

== Hobbs Crossroads alternate route ==
South Carolina Highway 53 Alternate
- Location: Hobbs Crossroads
- Existed: 1938–1947

South Carolina Highway 53 Alternate (SC 53 Alt.) was an alternate route that existed partially in Hobbs Crossroads. In May 1938, it was established from SC 341 south-southwest of the community, north-northeast to SC 53 and SC 309 in the community, then west-northwest and northwest back to SC 341. In 1947, it was decommissioned. Today, it is known as Amwell Church Road and Lynches River Road.

The entire route was in Sumter County.

Location	mi	km	Destinations	Notes
			SC 341	Southern terminus
Hobbs Crossroads			SC 53 / SC 309 south	Northern terminus of SC 309, which is now SC 403
			SC 341	Northern terminus
1.000 mi = 1.609 km; 1.000 km = 0.621 mi
