= South Carolina Highway 903 =

State highway in South Carolina, United States

South Carolina Highway 903

Route information
- Maintained by SCDOT
- Length: 27.090 mi (43.597 km)
- Existed: 1930–present

Major junctions
- South end: SC 151 in Catarrh
- US 601 in Midway; US 521 in Lancaster
- North end: US 521 Bus. / SC 200 in Lancaster

Location
- Country: United States
- State: South Carolina
- Counties: Chesterfield, Kershaw, Lancaster

Highway system
- South Carolina State Highway System; Interstate; US; State; Scenic
← SC 901	→ SC 905

South Carolina Highway 903 (SC 903) is a 27.090-mile (43.597 km) primary state highway in the U.S. state of South Carolina. It connects Lancaster to Darlington, Florence, and the Grand Strand.

== Route description ==
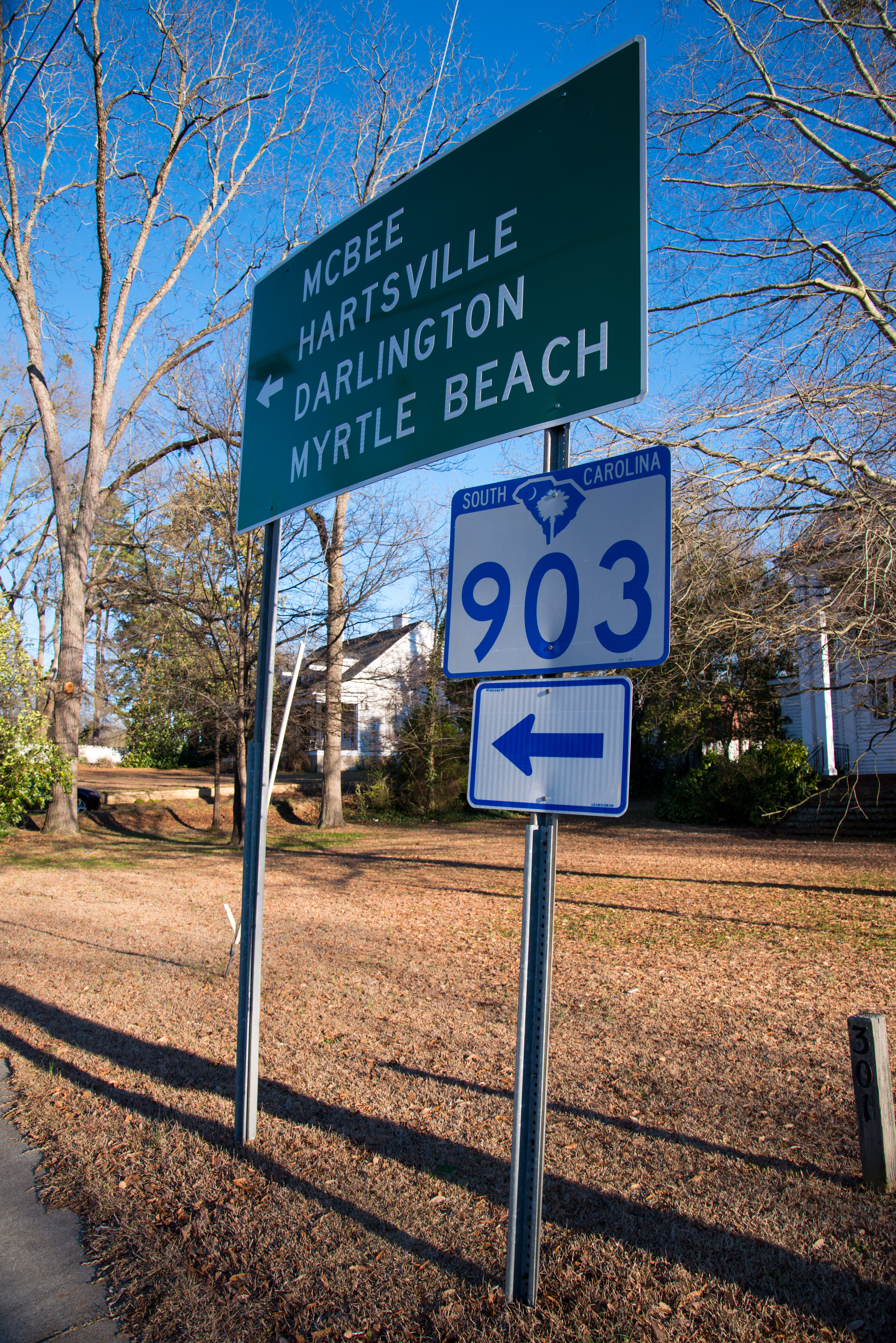
Listed cities for SC 903 in Lancaster

SC 903 is a two-lane rural highway, from Catarrh to Lancaster. Control cities listed southbound include Myrtle Beach.

== History ==
Established either in 1929 or 1930 as a new primary routing, it traversed from SC 35 in Catarrh to SC 9 in Midway. In 1949, SC 903 was extended north to its current northern terminus in Lancaster, replacing an old alignment of SC 9.

== Major intersections ==
County	Location	mi	km	Destinations	Notes
Chesterfield	Catarrh	0.000	0.000	SC 151 / Catarrh Road – Jefferson, McBee, Darlington, Myrtle Beach	Southern terminus
Kershaw		2.370	3.814	SC 346 south (Raleys Mill Road) / Holley Road	Northern terminus of SC 346
Lancaster		8.890	14.307	SC 265 (Old Jefferson Highway) – Kershaw, Jefferson	
Lancaster	Midway	10.830	17.429	US 601 north (Gold Mine Highway) – Pageland	Southern end of US 601 concurrency
Lancaster	Midway	10.910	17.558	US 601 south (Gold Mine Highway) – Kershaw	Northern end of US 601 concurrency
Lancaster	Primus	18.690	30.079	SC 522 (Rocky River Road) – Heath Springs	
Lancaster	Lancaster	25.910– 25.913	41.698– 41.703	US 521 (Lancaster Bypass) – Kershaw, Rock Hill, Chester	Interchange
Lancaster	Lancaster	27.090	43.597	US 521 Bus. / SC 200 (Main Street)	Northern terminus
1.000 mi = 1.609 km; 1.000 km = 0.621 mi: Concurrency terminus
