= South Carolina Highway 341 =

Highway in South Carolina

South Carolina Highway 341

Route information
- Maintained by SCDOT
- Length: 93.870 mi (151.069 km)

Major junctions
- South end: SC 41 / SC 51 in Johnsonville
- US 52 in Lake City; US 378 near Lake City; US 301 in Olanta; I-95 near Sardis; US 76 in Lynchburg; US 401 near Elliott; I-20 near Bishopville; US 15 / SC 34 in Bishopville; US 1 in Bethune
- North end: US 521 Bus. / US 601 Bus. in Kershaw

Location
- Country: United States
- State: South Carolina
- Counties: Florence, Sumter, Lee, Kershaw, Lancaster

Highway system
- South Carolina State Highway System; Interstate; US; State; Scenic
← SC 340	→ SC 346

South Carolina Highway 341 (SC 341) is a 93.870-mile (151.069 km) state highway that travels through the northeastern part of the U.S. state of South Carolina. It travels diagonally from the southeast to northwest (but signed as north–south) from SC 41 and SC 51 in Johnsonville to U.S. Route 521 Business (US 521 Bus.) and US 601 Bus. in Kershaw.

== Route description ==
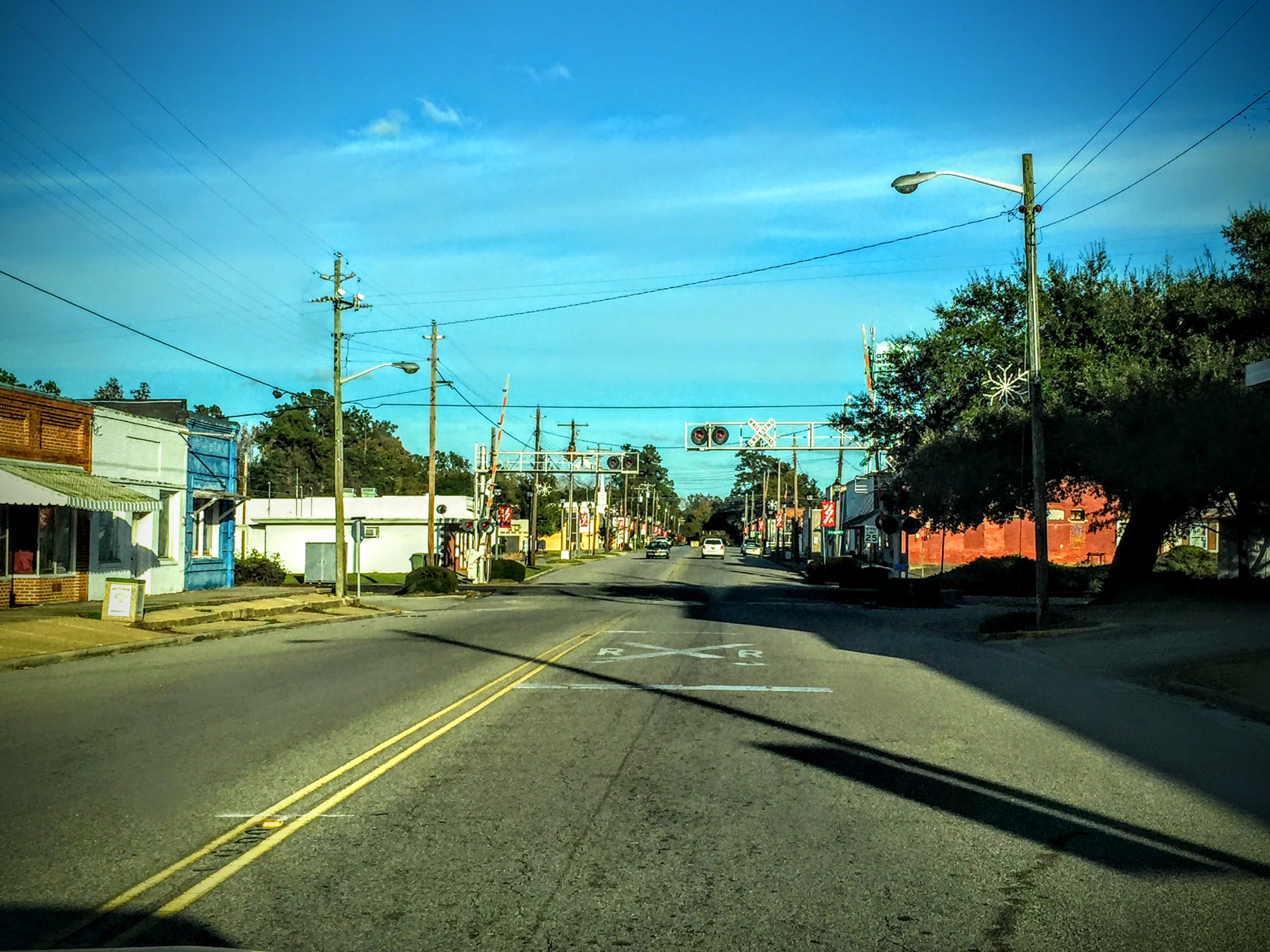
SC 341 in Johnsonville

SC 341 begins at the intersection of Georgetown Highway (SC 41/SC 51) and Broadway Street in central Johnsonville. SC 341 heads west along East Broadway Street through the town's business district. At a railroad crossing, the road name changes to West Broadway and continues past additional businesses. After exiting the city limits, the road's name changes to Lake City Highway but passes some other small businesses, houses, and churches. Further from the city, more farmland begins to surround the roadway. At the community of Prospect Corner, the road name becomes Johnsonville Highway but the highway's surroundings is generally the same. Before entering Lake City, SC 341 passes in front of some commercial and industrial warehouses. Upon entering Lake City, SC 341 travels through it on Main Street, first through a residential neighborhood with an elementary school located along it. At Church Street, US 378 Bus. joins SC 341 on a concurrency through the city. Commercial businesses line both sides of the street upon the beginning of the concurrency. In the center of the city, the two routes intersect US 52. After passing Matthews Road west of the downtown area, the road enters another residential neighborhood but then heads into an area with more farmlands. Upon its intersection with US 378, US 378 Bus. ends and SC 341 has a short 1/4-mile-long (0.40 km) concurrency with US 378.

Continuing northwest from US 378, SC 341 travels along Olanta Highway. At the community of Camp Branch, the highway intersects SC 403 at its southern terminus. SC 341 continues through mostly farmland and afterwards intersects SC 541 at its southern terminus. Shortly thereafter, the road enters the town of Olanta on Hampton Street. Within the town, the road passes in front of many houses, some small businesses, a library, and a school. In the center of town, SC 341 intersects US 301 then begins to curve to the north. The road heads through a mix of farmland and woods north of Olanta where it exits Florence County and enters Sumter County. After an intersection with SC 53, SC 341 begins to curve to the northwest and has an interchange with Interstate 95 (I-95) at its exit 146. After entering Lee County, SC 341 reaches the community of South Lynchburg where it intersects SC 58 at its western terminus. Soon after, it enters the town of Lynchburg where in the center, it has an intersection with US 76. It continues northwest along Lynchburg Highway through farmland and intersects US 401 about 1 1/2 miles (2.4 km) northeast of Elliott. At the settlement of Wisacky, SC 341 reaches the northern terminus of SC 527.

Now approaching the city of Bishopville, the highway passes in front of Lee Central High School and has an interchange with I-20 at exit 120. North of the Interstate, it passes the entrance to Lee Correctional Institution. Upon entering the city of Bishopville, it takes the name of East Church Street where it heads through a residential neighborhood then transitions to the business district. In the town center, SC 341 reaches Main Street which carries US 15 through the city. SC 341 and SC 34 (which came into this intersection from West Church Street) form a concurrency with US 15 and head northeast through Bishopville. Outside the city limits, SC 341 breaks off the US 15/SC 34 concurrency and heads north-northwest through farmland and woods on Bethune Highway. The highway enters Kershaw County and soon afterwards heads into the town of Bethune. It travels through the town on Main Street where it intersects US 1 and SC 346. Outside of Bethune, it heads through the pine forests of the Sandhills region. After crossing the Little Lynches River, the road enters Lancaster County. It then enters the town of Kershaw on South Minor Street. At Marion Street, SC 341 turns to the west while SC 157 begins and travels east on Marion Street and SC 157 Truck / SC 341 Truck head north on North Minor Street. The highway heads into the center of town where SC 341 ends at Hampton Street which carries US 521 Bus./US 601 Bus. Marion Street continues west to intersect US 501 and US 601 at Matson Street.

== Major intersections ==
County	Location	mi	km	Destinations	Notes
Florence	Johnsonville	0.000	0.000	SC 41 / SC 51 (Georgetown Highway) / East Broadway Street – Marion, Florence, Hemingway, Georgetown, Charleston	
Florence	Lake City	20.530	33.040	US 378 Bus. east (Church Street) – Myrtle Beach	Southern end of US 378 Bus. concurrency
Florence	Lake City	21.110	33.973	US 52 (Ron McNair Boulevard) – Florence–Darlington Technical College	
Florence		23.210	37.353	US 378 east (Turbeville Highway) / US 378 Bus. ends – Myrtle Beach	Northern end of US 378 Bus. concurrency; southern end of US 378 concurrency
Florence		23.470	37.771	US 378 west (Turbeville Highway) – Sumter	Northern end of US 378 concurrency
Florence	Camp Branch	24.930	40.121	SC 403 north (Bethel Road)	Southern terminus of SC 403
Florence		31.480	50.662	SC 541 north (West Old Number 4 Highway)	Southern terminus of SC 541
Florence	Olanta	32.630	52.513	US 301 (North Jones Road) – Turbeville, Florence	
Sumter		37.700	60.672	SC 53 (Narrow Paved Road) – Sumter, Columbia	
Sumter		40.120	64.567	I-95 – Florence, Savannah	I-95 exit 146
Lee	South Lynchburg	44.540	71.680	SC 58 east (Pleasant Grove Road) – Turbeville	Western terminus of SC 58
Lee	Lynchburg	45.340	72.968	US 76 (Florence Highway) – Sumter, Florence	
Lee		51.180	82.366	US 401 (Darlington Highway) – Sumter, Lamar, Lee State Park	
Lee	Wisacky	54.780	88.160	SC 527 south (Elliott Highway) / Cooper's Mill Road – Elliott, Kingstree	Northern terminus of SC 527
Lee		57.580– 57.591	92.666– 92.684	I-20 – Florence, Columbia	I-20 exit 120
Lee	Bishopville	60.800	97.848	US 15 south (South Main Street) – Sumter, Columbia SC 34 west (West Church Street) – Camden	Southern end of US 15/SC 34 concurrency
Lee		62.190	100.085	US 15 north / SC 34 east (Hartsville Highway) to I-20 east – Hartsville, Darlington	Northern end of US 15/SC 34 concurrency
Kershaw	Bethune	76.610	123.292	US 1 (King Street) – [[, South Carolina|]], [[, South Carolina|]]	
Kershaw	Bethune	77.060	124.016	SC 346 north (Hampton Street)	Southern terminus of SC 346
Lancaster	Kershaw	93.610	150.651	SC 157 north (East Marion Street) SC 157 Truck / SC 341 Truck north (North Minor Street)	Southern terminus of SC 157, SC 157 Truck, and SC 341 Truck
Lancaster	Kershaw	93.870	151.069	US 521 Bus. / US 601 Bus. (Hampton Street) / West Marion Street – Heath Springs, Lancaster, Charlotte	Northern terminus
1.000 mi = 1.609 km; 1.000 km = 0.621 mi: Concurrency terminus

== Kershaw truck route ==
South Carolina Highway 341 Truck
- Location: Kershaw, South Carolina
- Length: 1.330 mi (2.140 km)

South Carolina Highway 341 Truck (SC 341 Truck) is a 1.330-mile (2.140 km) truck route for trucks traveling through Kershaw. For its entire length, it is concurrent with SC 157 Truck. Its southern terminus is at the intersection of Marion Street and Minor Street which is also where SR 341 has its southern terminus and SR 157 travels through. As trucks are banned on East Marion Street through Kershaw, the truck route bypasses the downtown area. The highways head north along North Minor Street for three blocks to Hilton Street, which carries U.S. Route 601 (US 601). The northbound directions of the two truck routes travel along southbound US 601 forming a wrong-way concurrency. At North Hampton Street, the highways reach U.S. Route 521 Business (US 521 Bus.) and US 601 Bus. Continuing west along Hilton Street, they cross a railroad track before the truck routes terminate at US 521 (North Matson Street). US 601 from this point continues south along US 521 around the west side of the town.
