= Special routes of U.S. Route 601 =

Special routes of U.S. Route 601

Highway system
- United States Numbered Highway System; List; Special; Divided

A total of at least five special routes of U.S. Route 601 have existed, one of which has been deleted.

== Special routes ==
=== Orangeburg truck route ===
U.S. Highway 601 Truck
- Location: Orangeburg, South Carolina
- Length: 5.2 mi (8.4 km)

U.S. Route 601 Truck (US 601 Truck) is a truck route to direct truck traffic to avoid downtown Orangeburg. The highway travels concurrently with South Carolina Highway 4 (SC 4) on Stonewall Jackson Boulevard, then with US 21/US 178 on Joe S. Jeffords Highway/Whittaker Parkway/Chestnut Street.

The entire route is in Orangeburg County.

Location	mi	km	Destinations	Notes
Orangeburg	0.0	0.0	US 301 / US 601 / SC 4 west (John C. Calhoun Drive) – Allendale, Hampton	Southern end of SC 4 concurrency; southern terminus
	1.9	3.1	US 21 Bus. north / US 21 south (Rowesville Road) – Rowesville, Branchville, Walterboro, Savannah, Methodist Oaks	Northern end of SC 4 concurrency; southern end of US 21 concurrency; southern terminus of US 21 Bus.; eastern terminus of SC 4
Wilkinson Heights	2.0	3.2	US 178 Bus. west (Charleston Highway) / US 178 east – Charleston, Southern Methodist College	Southern end of US 178 concurrency; eastern terminus of US 178
Wilkinson Heights	3.3	5.3	US 301 (Five Chop Road) – Orangeburg, Santee	
Wilkinson Heights	4.4	7.1	SC 33 (Russell Street) – Orangeburg, Cameron	
Orangeburg	5.2	8.4	US 21 Bus. south / US 601 south (Magnolia Street) – Orangeburg US 21 north / US 178 west (Chestnut Street) – North US 601 north (Magnolia Street) to I-26 – St. Matthews, Columbia	Northern end of US 21 and US 178 concurrencies; northern terminus of US 21 Bus.; US 601 north provides access to Regional Medical Center.
1.000 mi = 1.609 km; 1.000 km = 0.621 mi: Concurrency terminus

=== Camden truck route ===
U.S. Highway 601 Truck
- Location: Camden, South Carolina
- Length: 3.980 mi (6.405 km)

U.S. Route 601 Truck (US 601 Truck) is a 3.980-mile (6.405 km) truck route for truck traffic to avoid downtown Camden. The highway is in complete concurrency with US 521 Truck on Springdale Drive and Boykin Road.

The entire route is in Camden, Kershaw County.

mi	km	Destinations	Notes
0.000	0.000	US 1 / US 601 / US 521 Truck south (West DeKalb Street)	Southern end of US 521 truck concurrency
3.500	5.633	SC 97 (Liberty Hill Road)	
3.980	6.405	US 521 / US 601 (Kershaw Road)	Northern end of US 521 Truck concurrency; northern terminus of US 521 Truck and US 601 Truck
1.000 mi = 1.609 km; 1.000 km = 0.621 mi: Concurrency terminus

=== Kershaw business loop ===
U.S. Highway 601 Business
- Location: Kershaw, South Carolina
- Length: 0.760 mi (1,223 m)

U.S. Route 601 Business (US 601 Bus.) is a business route of US 601 that follows the original mainline of US 601 along Hampton Street. The highway is completely concurrent with US 521 Bus.

The entire route is in Kershaw, Lancaster County.

mi	km	Destinations	Notes
0.000	0.000	US 521 / US 601 (Hampton Street) – Carolina Motorsports Park	Southern end of US 521 Bus. concurrency; southern terminus of US 521 Bus. and US 601 Bus.
0.480	0.772	SC 341 south (Marion Street) – Bethune	Northern terminus of SC 341
0.760	1.223	Hilton Street (US 521 Truck south / US 601 / SC 157 Truck / SC 341 Truck) – Jefferson, Pageland	Northern end of US 521 Bus. concurrency; northern terminus of US 521 Truck and US 601 Bus.
1.000 mi = 1.609 km; 1.000 km = 0.621 mi: Concurrency terminus

=== Dobson business loop ===
U.S. Highway 601 Business
- Location: Dobson, North Carolina
- Length: 4.1 mi (6.6 km)
- Existed: 1970–present

U.S. Route 601 Business, established in 1970, is a 4.1-mile (6.6 km) business loop that follows the original mainline route through downtown Dobson, via Main Street.

The entire route is in Surry County.

Location	mi	km	Destinations	Notes
Dobson	0.0	0.0	US 601 – Mount Airy, Yadkinville	
	4.1	6.6	US 601 – Mount Airy, Winston-Salem	
1.000 mi = 1.609 km; 1.000 km = 0.621 mi

== Former special routes ==
=== Concord business loop ===
U.S. Highway 601 Business
- Location: Concord, North Carolina
- Length: 5.2 mi (8.4 km)
- Existed: 1965–1997

U.S. Route 601 Business was established in October 1965 and followed the original route through downtown Concord, via Church and Union Streets and in concurrency with NC 73. In July 1997, the business loop was decommissioned
