= Special routes of U.S. Route 521 =

Special routes of U.S. Route 521

Highway system
- United States Numbered Highway System; List; Special; Divided

Four special routes of U.S. Route 521 exist, and two others have existed in the past. In order from south to north they are as follows.

== Existing routes ==
=== Andrews business loop ===
U.S. Highway 521 Business
- Location: Andrews, South Carolina
- Length: 3.420 mi (5.504 km)

U.S. Route 521 Business (US 521 Bus.) is a 3.420 miles (5.504 km) business route of US 521 that travels through downtown Andrews, via Main Street. It follows the old US 521 mainline route.

The entire route is in Georgetown County.

Location	mi	km	Destinations	Notes
	0.000	0.000	US 521 (Georgetown Highway) – Manning	Southern terminus; flyover interchange
Andrews	2.410	3.879	SC 41 Bus. (Morgan Avenue) – Jamestown, Hemingway	
Andrews	3.420	5.504	US 521 south / SC 41 south (County Line Road) – Charleston, Georgetown US 521 north – Kingstree, Manning SC 41 north (County Line Road) – Hemingway, Andrews High School	Northern terminus
1.000 mi = 1.609 km; 1.000 km = 0.621 mi

=== Camden truck route 1 ===
U.S. Highway 521 Truck
- Location: Camden, South Carolina
- Length: 6.9 mi (11.1 km)

U.S. Route 521 Truck (US 521 Truck) is a truck route of US 521 to direct truck traffic to avoid downtown Camden. The highway takes various roads including: Ehrenclou Drive, Chestnut Ferry Road, Jefferson Davis Highway (in concurrency with US 1/US 601/SC 34), Springdale Drive, and Boykin Road (in concurrency with US 601 Truck). Nearly the entire length of the truck route is within the city limits of Camden.

The entire route is in Camden, Kershaw County.

mi	km	Destinations	Notes
0.0	0.0	US 1 Truck north / US 521 (South Broad Street) to I-20	Southern terminus of US 1 Truck and US 521 Truck
		US 1 north / US 601 north (West DeKalb Street / SC 34 east)	Southern end of US 1/US 601/SC 34 concurrency
		Senator Donald H. Don Holland Memorial Bridge	Crossing over railroad tracks of CSX
		US 1 south / US 601 south (West DeKalb Street / SC 34) / US 601 Truck begins	Northern end of US 1/US 601/SC 34 concurrency; southern end of US 601 Truck concurrency; southern terminus of US 601 Truck
		SC 97 (Liberty Hill Road)	
		US 521 / US 601 (Kershaw Road)	Northern end of US 601 Truck concurrency; northern terminus of US 521 Truck and US 601 Truck
1.000 mi = 1.609 km; 1.000 km = 0.621 mi: Concurrency terminus

=== Camden truck route 2 ===
U.S. Highway 521 Truck
- Location: Camden, South Carolina
- Length: 0.830 mi (1,336 m)

U.S. Route 521 Truck (US 521 Truck) is a 0.830-mile (1.336 km) truck route of US 521 that exists entirely within the southern part of Camden. It uses York Street and Mill Street to connect US 521 (Broad Street) with US 1/SC 34 (East Dekalb Street). It is entirely concurrent with SC 34 Truck. The southbound lanes are also part of US 1 Truck, with no indication of US 1 Truck or SC 34 Truck; the northbound lanes have no indication of US 521 Truck.

=== Kershaw business loop ===
U.S. Highway 521 Business
- Location: Kershaw, South Carolina
- Length: 1.500 mi (2.414 km)

U.S. Route 521 Business (US 521 Bus.) is a 1.500-mile (2.414 km) business route of US 521 that exists in Kershaw. It travels through downtown, via Hampton Street. It also has a concurrency with US 601 Bus. It follows the former path of US 521.

The entire route is in Lancaster County.

Location	mi	km	Destinations	Notes
Kershaw	0.000	0.000	US 521 / US 601 (Hampton Street) – Carolina Motorsports Park	Southern end of US 601 Bus. concurrency; southern terminus of US 521 Bus. and US 601 Bus.
Kershaw	0.480	0.772	SC 341 south (Marion Street) – Bethune	Northern terminus of SC 341
Kershaw	0.760	1.223	Hilton Street (US 521 Truck south / US 601 / SC 157 Truck / SC 341 Truck) – Jefferson, Pageland	Northern end of US 601 Bus. concurrency; northern terminus of US 521 Truck and US 601 Bus.
	1.500	2.414	US 521 – Sumter	Northern terminus
1.000 mi = 1.609 km; 1.000 km = 0.621 mi: Concurrency terminus

=== Kershaw truck route ===
U.S. Highway 521 Truck
- Location: Kershaw, South Carolina
- Length: 0.140 mi (225 m)

U.S. Route 521 Truck (US 521 Truck) is a truck route of US 521 that exists entirely within the northern part of the town of Kershaw. It connects US 521 (North Matson Street) with US 521 Business (US 521 Bus.) and US 601 Bus. (North Hampton Street). It is completely concurrent with US 601, South Carolina Highway 157 Truck (SC 157 Truck), and SC 341 Truck. It is known as Hilton Street. There is no signs on US 521 or US 521 Bus./US 601 Bus. There is one sign just south of its northern terminus.

=== Kershaw connector route ===
U.S. Highway 521 Connector
- Location: Kershaw, South Carolina
- Length: 0.060 mi (97 m)

U.S. Route 521 Connector (US 521 Conn.) is a 0.060-mile (0.097 km) connector route of US 521 that serves to connect US 521 Business (US 521 Bus.) with US 521 (North Matson Street / Kershaw–Camden Highway) north of Kershaw. It is unnamed and is an unsigned highway.

=== Lancaster business loop ===
U.S. Highway 521 Business
- Location: Lancaster, South Carolina
- Length: 3.870 mi (6.228 km)
- Existed: 1965–present

U.S. Route 521 Business (US 521 Bus.) is a 3.870-mile (6.228 km) business route of US 521 that travels through downtown Lancaster, via Market Street and Main Street. It follows the old US 521 mainline route. At some point, it was relocated to Market Street until the intersection with Barr Street, where it turned left and then right onto Main Street.

The entire route is in Lancaster, Lancaster County.

mi	km	Destinations	Notes
0.000	0.000	US 521 (Kershaw-Camden Highway/Lancaster Bypass) – Heath Springs, Kershaw	Southern terminus
1.440	2.317	Camden–Kershaw Highway north	Southern terminus of Camden–Kershaw Highway; former US 521 Bus. north
1.660	2.672	SC 200 west (Great Falls Highway) – Great Falls	Southern end of SC 200 concurrency
2.270	3.653	SC 903 south (Chesterfield Avenue) – McBee	Northern terminus of SC 903
2.380	3.830	SC 9 Bus. south (East Arch Street) – Pageland	Southern end of SC 9 Bus. concurrency
2.650	4.265	SC 9 Bus. north (East Meeting Street) – Chester, Charlotte	Northern end of SC 9 Bus. concurrency
2.900	4.667	West Barr Street west / North Main Street south	Former US 521 Bus. south; US 521 Bus./SC 200 turns right.
3.680	5.922	SC 200 east (Liberty Hill Road) to US 521 south – Pageland, Monroe	Northern end of SC 200 concurrency
3.870	6.228	US 521 north / SC 9 (Lancaster Bypass) – Chester, Rock Hill, Charlotte, Chesterfield, Chester, Myrtle Beach, Andrew Jackson State Park	Northern terminus; interchange
1.000 mi = 1.609 km; 1.000 km = 0.621 mi: Concurrency terminus

== Former special routes ==
=== Sumter connector ===
U.S. Highway 521 Connector
- Location: Sumter, South Carolina
- Length: 4.7 mi (7.6 km)

U.S. Route 521 Connector (US 521) was a 4.7 miles (7.6 km) connector route that went east around Sumter along Guignard Drive, connecting to US 15, in the southern end of Sumter. This connector became part of the main route sometime before 2009.

=== Lancaster Bypass ===
U.S. Highway 521 Bypass
- Location: Lancaster, South Carolina

U.S. Route 521 Bypass (US 521 Byp.) was the bypass around downtown Lancaster, until the mainline was realigned in 1965, and the former route was converted into US 521 Business (US 521 Bus.).
