= U.S. Route 521 =

Highway in North and South Carolina

U.S. Route 521
- US 521 highlighted in red

Route information
- Auxiliary route of US 21
- Length: 177.3 mi (285.3 km)
- Existed: 1932–present

Major junctions
- South end: US 17 in Georgetown, SC
- US 17 Alt. in Georgetown, SC; I-95 near Manning, SC; US 15 / US 401 in Sumter, SC; US 76 / US 76 Bus. / US 378 in Sumter, SC; I-20 in Camden, SC; US 1 / US 601 / SC 34 in Camden, SC
- North end: I-485 in Charlotte, NC

Location
- Country: United States
- States: South Carolina, North Carolina
- Counties: SC: Georgetown, Williamsburg, Clarendon, Sumter, Kershaw, Lancaster; NC: Mecklenburg

Highway system
- United States Numbered Highway System; List; Special; Divided; South Carolina State Highway System; Interstate; US; State; Scenic; North Carolina Highway System; Interstate; US; State; Scenic
← I-520	SC	→ SC 522
← US 501	NC	→ NC 522

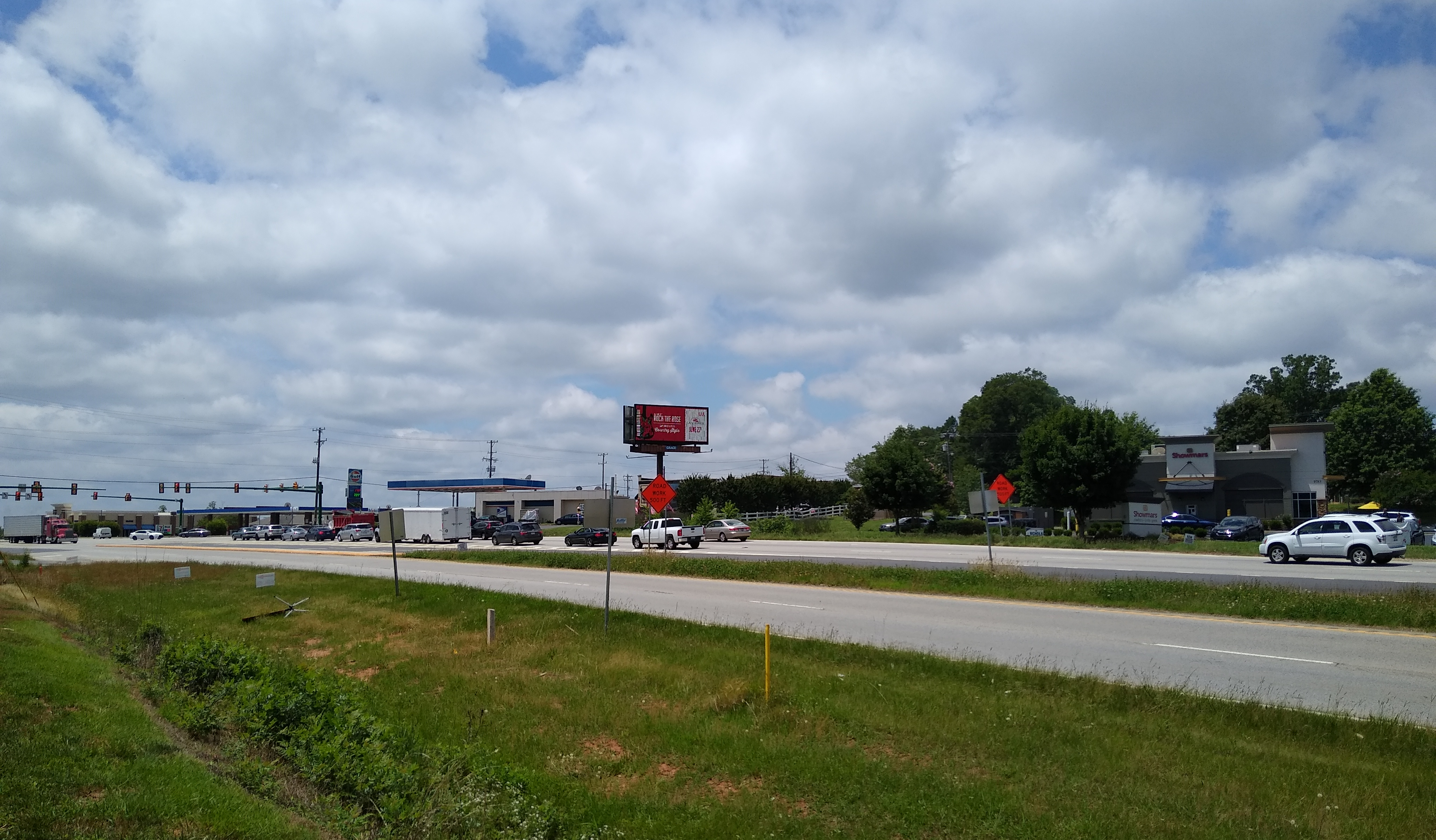
US 521 in Indian Land, South Carolina

U.S. Route 521 (US 521) is a north–south United States Highway that traverses 177.3 miles (285.3 km), from Georgetown, South Carolina, to Charlotte, North Carolina. Though numbered as an auxiliary route of US 21, it does not actually intersect its parent or any of its sibling routes, though it is in the same general part of the country as other routes from its family. Historically, it once connected to US 21 in Pineville, North Carolina, but various changes have left it terminating a few miles short of the current US 21.

== Route description ==
=== South Carolina ===
Starting at the city of Georgetown, US 521 runs through the town Andrews to Greeleyville. From here to the city of Manning it is known as the Greeleyville Highway. There is a brief section right before Manning where it runs concurrent with SC 261. In Manning SC 261 branches off and US 521 merges with US 301 for a short distance. It crosses over Interstate 95 (I-95) and heads to the city of Sumter. In Sumter, it runs together with US Business 378. Leaving Sumter, US 521 is known as Camden Highway. It passes under I-20 and proceeds to Camden. It then goes on to the town of Kershaw, running concurrent with US 601. The final city it goes through before going into North Carolina is Lancaster.

=== North Carolina ===
View north along US 521 in Ballantyne

US 521 traverses 3.8 miles (6.1 km) from the South Carolina state line to I-485. The entire route is a four- to six-lane divided highway, split in naming between Lancaster Highway and Johnston Road.

== History ==
Established in 1932, it was overlapped entirely with SC 26, from Georgetown to the North Carolina state line, where it continued with NC 26 into Pineville, where it ended at U.S. Route 21/NC 261 (now NC 51). In 1933, SC 26 was decommissioned; followed in 1934 with the decommissioning of NC 26.

In 1949, US 521 was rerouted in Williamsburg County to run directly from Andrews, through Salters and Greeleyville, to Manning; which replaced SC 171 and part of SC 261, the old alignment became part of SC 377 and SC 261. Between 1962 and 1964, US 521 was rerouted at the Sumter-Kershaw county line to Camden; the old alignment became an extension of SC 261.

In 1969, US 521 was extended 19 miles (31 km) north, via South Boulevard, and Wilkinson Blvd, then in 1981, by way of Woodlawn Road, and Billy Graham Parkway, to I-85 in Charlotte.

Between 1986 and 1988, US 521 was moved west onto new highway west of Dalzell, bypassing the town; the old alignment was downgraded to secondary roads.

In 1996, US 521 was rerouted onto I-485, between exits 61 and 65; the old alignment was downgraded to secondary roads. In 2003, the American Association of State Highway and Transportation Officials (AASHTO) approved US 521 to be truncated at its current northern terminus at the Johnston Road/I-485 interchange; its old alignment north to I-85 was downgraded to secondary roads.

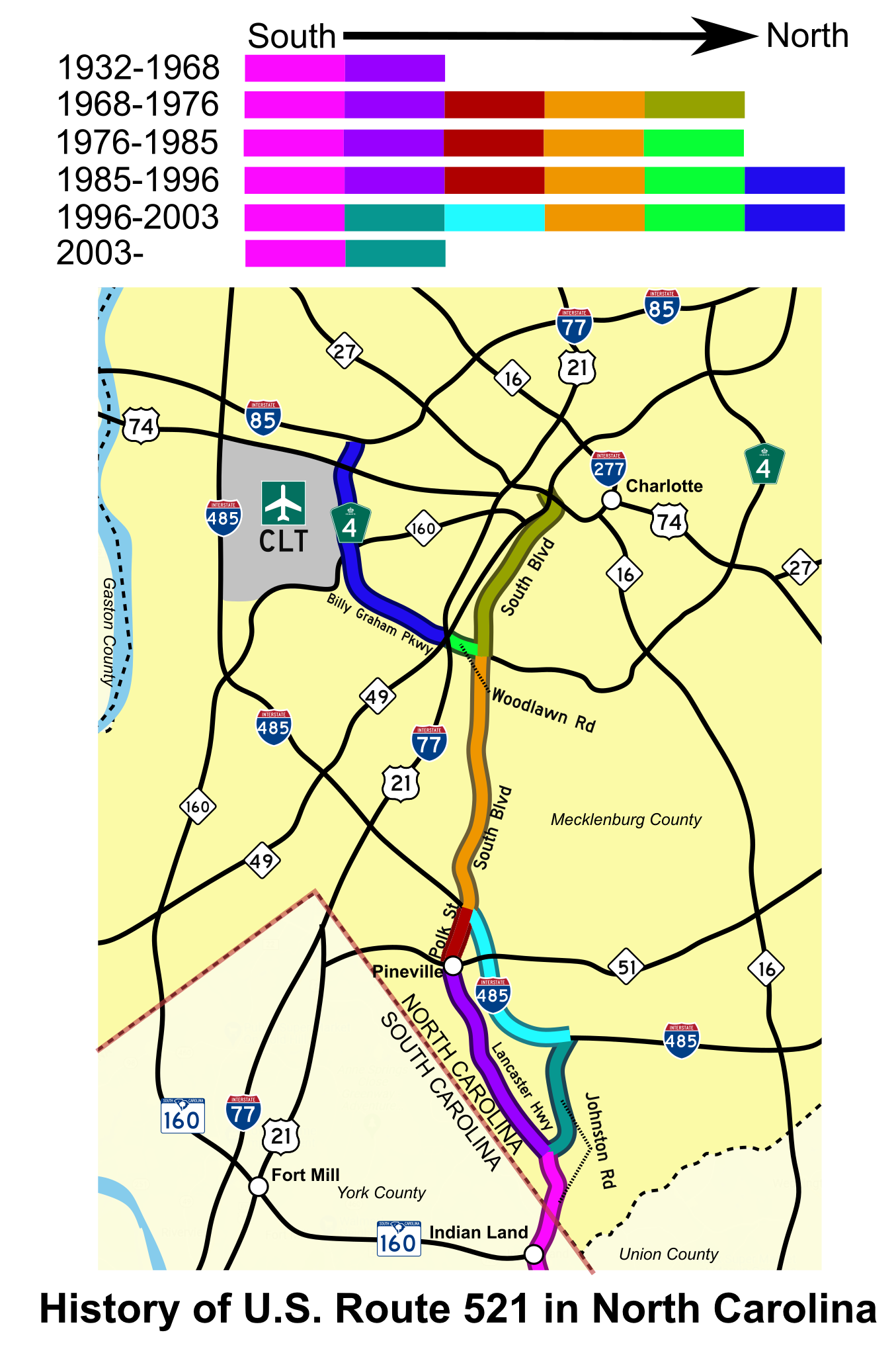
A map showing the history of U.S. Route 521 in North Carolina, with the various alignments it has had over time.

== Future ==
There are plans to make US 521 a four-lane highway from Georgetown to I-95, in Manning. This would improve a route for beach goers traveling toward the Litchfield/Pawleys area.

== Junction list ==
State	County	Location	mi	km	Exit	Destinations	Notes
South Carolina	Georgetown	Georgetown	0.0	0.0		US 17 (Fraser Street) – Charleston, Myrtle Beach	Southern terminus
South Carolina	Georgetown	Georgetown	0.1	0.16		US 17 Alt. (Exchange Street) – Pawleys Island, Myrtle Beach	Southern end of US 17 Alt. concurrency
South Carolina	Georgetown	Sampit	9.5	15.3		US 17 Alt. (Saints Delight Road) – Jamestown, Moncks Corner	Northern end of US 17 Alt. concurrency
South Carolina	Georgetown		16.0	25.7		US 521 Bus. – Andrews	
South Carolina	Georgetown		18.5	29.8		To SC 41 Bus. – Andrews	
South Carolina	Georgetown		19.5	31.4		SC 41 (County Line Road) – Jamestown, Charleston	Southern end of SC 41 concurrency
South Carolina	Williamsburg	Andrews	21.0	33.8		US 521 Bus. / SC 41 (County Line Road) – Hemingway	Northern end of SC 41 concurrency
South Carolina	Williamsburg		38.0	61.2		SC 377 (Martin Luther King Jr. Avenue) – Lane, Kingstree	
South Carolina	Williamsburg		45.5	73.2		US 52 (Williamsburg County Highway) – Charleston, Kingstree	
South Carolina	Williamsburg	Greeleyville	48.5	78.1		SC 375 south (Gourdin Road) – St. Stephen, Charleston	Northern terminus of SC 375
South Carolina	Clarendon		60.5	97.4		SC 261 east (Kingstree Highway) – Kingstree	Southern end of SC 261 concurrency
South Carolina	Clarendon	Manning	63.5	102.2		SC 261 west (Boyce Street)	Northern end of SC 261 concurrency
South Carolina	Clarendon	Manning	64.0	103.0		US 301 south (Brooks Street)	Southern end of US 301 concurrency
South Carolina	Clarendon		65.5	105.4		US 301 north – Turbeville	Northern end of US 301 concurrency
South Carolina	Clarendon		67.0	107.8		I-95 / Main Street north (US 301 Conn. north) – Florence, Savannah	I-95 exit 122; southern terminus of US 301 Conn. and Main Street
South Carolina	Clarendon	Alcolu				Main Street south (US 301 Conn. south)	Northern terminus of US 301 Conn. and Main Street
South Carolina	Sumter	Sumter–South Sumter line	80.5	129.6		US 15 (Pocalla Road) – Summerton, Bishopville	
South Carolina	Sumter	Sumter–South Sumter line				US 15 Conn. south to US 15 south	Northern terminus of US 15 Conn.
South Carolina	Sumter	Sumter	82.3	132.4		SC 763 (West Liberty Street) – Genealogical and Historical Research Center, Sumter County Museum	
South Carolina	Sumter	Sumter	83.0	133.6		US 76 Bus. east (Broad Street) / Bultman Drive north – Sumter	Southern end of US 76 Bus. concurrency; Bultman Drive continues past intersection
South Carolina	Sumter	Sumter	86.0	138.4		US 76 Bus. west (Broad Street) – Shaw Air Force Base, Columbia	Northern end of US 76 Bus. concurrency
South Carolina	Sumter	Sumter				South Pike West east to US 76 east / US 378 east – Conway	No access from US 521 to westbound US 76/US 378 or from eastbound US 76/US 378 to US 521
South Carolina	Sumter	Dalzell	93.5	150.5		SC 441 (Peach Orchard Road) – Bishopville, Shaw Air Force Base	
South Carolina	Kershaw		107.0	172.2		SC 261 (Boykin Road)	
South Carolina	Kershaw	Camden	110.0	177.0		I-20 – Columbia, Florence	I-20 exit 98
South Carolina	Kershaw	Camden				US 521 Truck north (Ehrenclou Drive) / US 1 Truck begins – Camden High School	Southern end of US 1 Truck concurrency; southern terminus of US 1 Truck and US 521 Truck
South Carolina	Kershaw	Camden				US 1 Truck north / SC 34 Truck north (York Street / US 521 Truck north) – Camden High School, Alpha Center	Northern end of US 1 Truck concurrency; southern terminus of US 521 Truck and SC 34 Truck
South Carolina	Kershaw	Camden	111.0	178.6		US 1 / US 601 south / SC 34 (Dekalb Street) – Columbia, Cheraw, Bishopville	Southern end of US 601 concurrency
South Carolina	Kershaw	Camden				US 521 Truck south / US 601 Truck south (Boykin Road) / Cool Springs Drive east – Springdale Race Course, Steeplechase Museum, Camden Country Club	Northern terminus of US 521 Truck, US 601 Truck, and Boykin Road; western terminus of Cool Springs Drive
South Carolina	Kershaw	Camden	113.0	181.9		SC 97 north (Liberty Hill Road) – Great Falls	Southern terminus of SC 97
South Carolina	Lancaster	Kershaw	133.0	214.0		SC 341 south (Marion Street) – Bethune	Northern terminus of SC 341 north
South Carolina	Lancaster	Kershaw	133.3	214.5		US 601 north (Hilton Street) – Pageland	Northern end of US 601 concurrency
South Carolina	Lancaster	Heath Springs	139.0	223.7		SC 522 south (Caston Street) – Liberty Hill	
South Carolina	Lancaster	Pleasant Hill	142.0	228.5		SC 522 north (Rocky River Road)	
South Carolina	Lancaster		148.0	238.2		US 521 Bus. north (Kershaw Camden Highway)	Southern terminus of US 521 Bus.
South Carolina	Lancaster	Lancaster	149.0	239.8		SC 903 (Flat Creek Road) – Lancaster, McBee, Hartsville, Myrtle Beach	Interchange
South Carolina	Lancaster		150.0	241.4		SC 9 south (Pageland Highway) / SC 9 Bus. north (Arch Street) – Pageland, Lancaster	Southern end of SC 9 concurrency; interchange
South Carolina	Lancaster	Lancaster	152.0	244.6		SC 200 (Monroe Road) – Lancaster, Monroe	Interchange
South Carolina	Lancaster	Lancaster	152.5	245.4		US 521 Bus. south (Main Street) / SC 9 north – Chester	Northern end of SC 9 concurrency; northern terminus of US 521 Bus.; interchange
South Carolina	Lancaster		159.0	255.9		SC 5 north / SC 75 Truck south (Rock Hill Highway) – Rock Hill	Southern end of SC 75 Truck concurrency; southern terminus of SC 5
South Carolina	Lancaster		161.5	259.9		SC 75 south (Rebound Road)	Northern end of SC 75 Truck concurrency; southern end of SC 75 concurrency
South Carolina	Lancaster		165.0	265.5		SC 75 north (Waxhaw Highway) – Waxhaw	Northern end of SC 75 concurrency
South Carolina	Lancaster	Indian Land	172.0	276.8		SC 160 north (Fort Mill Highway) – Fort Mill	Southern terminus of SC 160
			173.5 0.0	279.2 0.0	South Carolina–North Carolina state line		
North Carolina	Mecklenburg	Charlotte	1.0	1.6		Lancaster Highway – Pineville	
North Carolina	Mecklenburg	Charlotte	3.8	6.1		I-485 – Matthews, Pineville	Northern terminus
1.000 mi = 1.609 km; 1.000 km = 0.621 mi: Concurrency terminus
