= South Carolina Highway 26 =

South Carolina Highway 26 may refer to:

- South Carolina Highway 26 (1920s), a former state highway from Georgetown to north of Indian Land
- South Carolina Highway 26 (1950s), a former state highway from Camden to Kershaw
