= North Carolina Highway 522 =

State highway in Union County, North Carolina, US

North Carolina Highway 522
- Rocky River Road

Route information
- Maintained by NCDOT
- Length: 5.8 mi (9.3 km)
- Existed: 1951–present

Major junctions
- South end: SC 522 at the South Carolina state line near Roughedge
- North end: NC 200 in Roughedge

Location
- Country: United States
- State: North Carolina
- Counties: Union

Highway system
- North Carolina Highway System; Interstate; US; State; Scenic
← US 501	→ I-540

North Carolina Highway 522 (NC 522) is a primary state highway in the U.S. state of North Carolina. The highway runs north–south from the South Carolina state line, near Sapps Crossroads to NC 200 in Roughedge, entirely in Union County.

== Route description ==
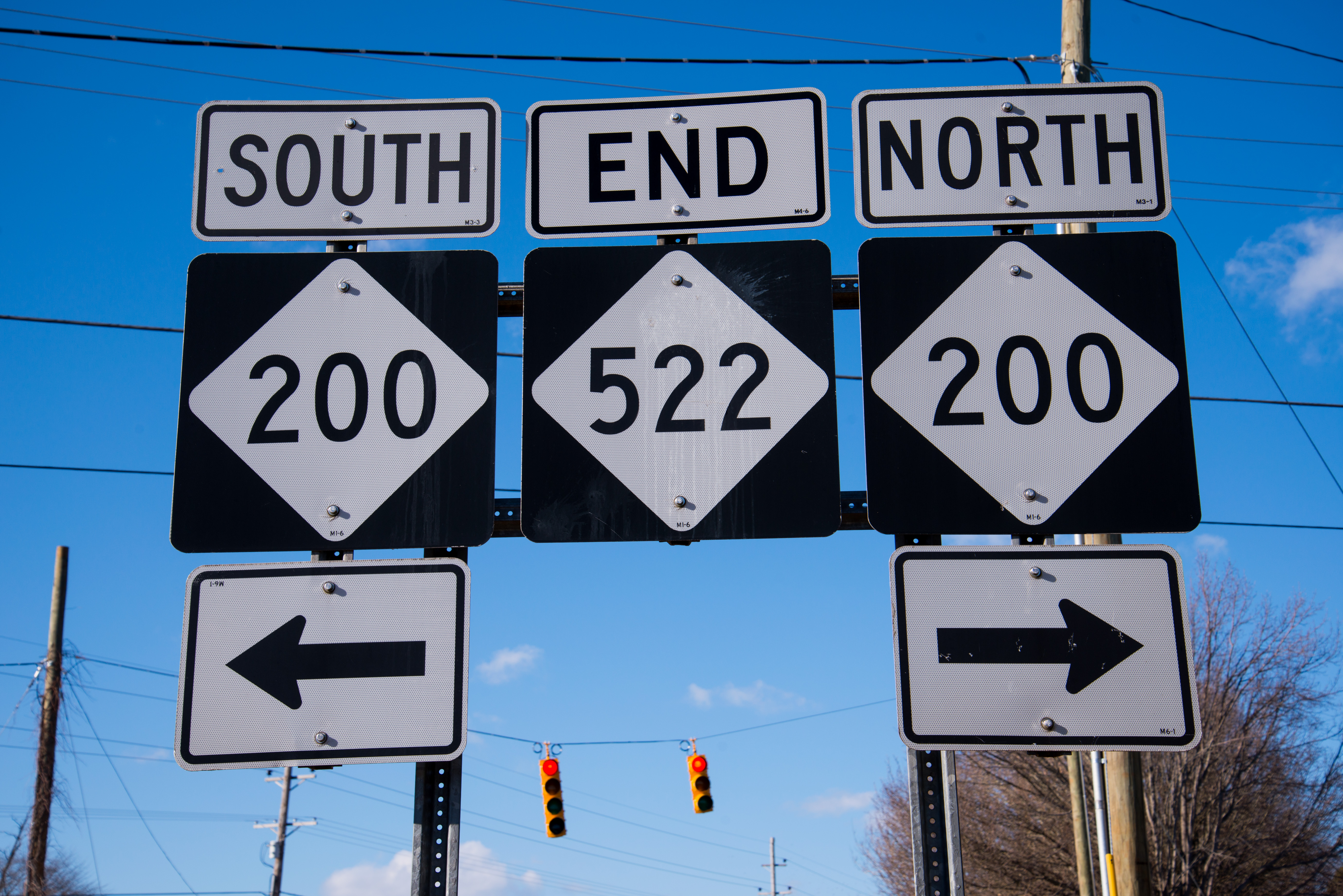
End of NC 522 at NC 200, in Roughedge

NC 522 is a short 5.84-mile (9.40 km) two-lane rural highway in Union County, passing through an area of mixed forest and farmland.

== History ==
Established as a new primary routing around 1951, it is complementary extension of SC 522; unchanged since.

== Junction list ==
The entire route is in Union County.

Location	mi	km	Destinations	Notes
	0.0	0.0	SC 522 west (Rocky River Road) – Pleasant Hill	South Carolina state line
Roughedge	5.8	9.3	NC 200 (Lancaster Highway) / Rocky River Road – Monroe, Lancaster	
1.000 mi = 1.609 km; 1.000 km = 0.621 mi
