= Pleasant Hill, South Carolina =

- Unincorporated community
- Location within South Carolina Location within the United States
- Coordinates: 34°37′13″N 80°41′06″W
- Country: United States
- State: South Carolina
- County: Lancaster
- Elevation: 719 ft (219 m)
- Time zone: UTC-5 (Eastern (EST))
  - Summer (DST): UTC-4 (EDT)
- ZIP code: 29058
- Area codes: 803, 839
- GNIS feature ID: 1250165

Pleasant Hill is an unincorporated community located in Lancaster County, South Carolina, United States. The area consists of some businesses and churches lining US 521 and houses located along other roads in the area. A Lancaster and Chester Railroad line runs through Pleasant Hill.

== Location ==
It is located two miles (3.2 km) north of Heath Springs located at the northernmost junction of U.S. Route 521 (US 521) and South Carolina Highway 522.
