= Roughedge, North Carolina =

Roughedge
- Unincorporated community
- Location within the state of North Carolina
- Coordinates: 34°53′58″N 80°37′25″W
- Country: United States
- State: North Carolina
- County: Union County
- Elevation: 705 ft (215 m)
- Time zone: UTC-5 (Eastern (EST))
  - Summer (DST): UTC-4 (EDT)
- ZIP code: 28112
- Area codes: 704, 980
- GNIS feature ID: 1022407

Roughedge is an unincorporated community in Union County, North Carolina, United States. It is located southwest of Monroe, at the intersection of NC 200 (Lancaster Highway) and NC 522 (Rocky River Road).
