= Heath Springs station =

- Heath Springs Depot
- U.S. National Register of Historic Places
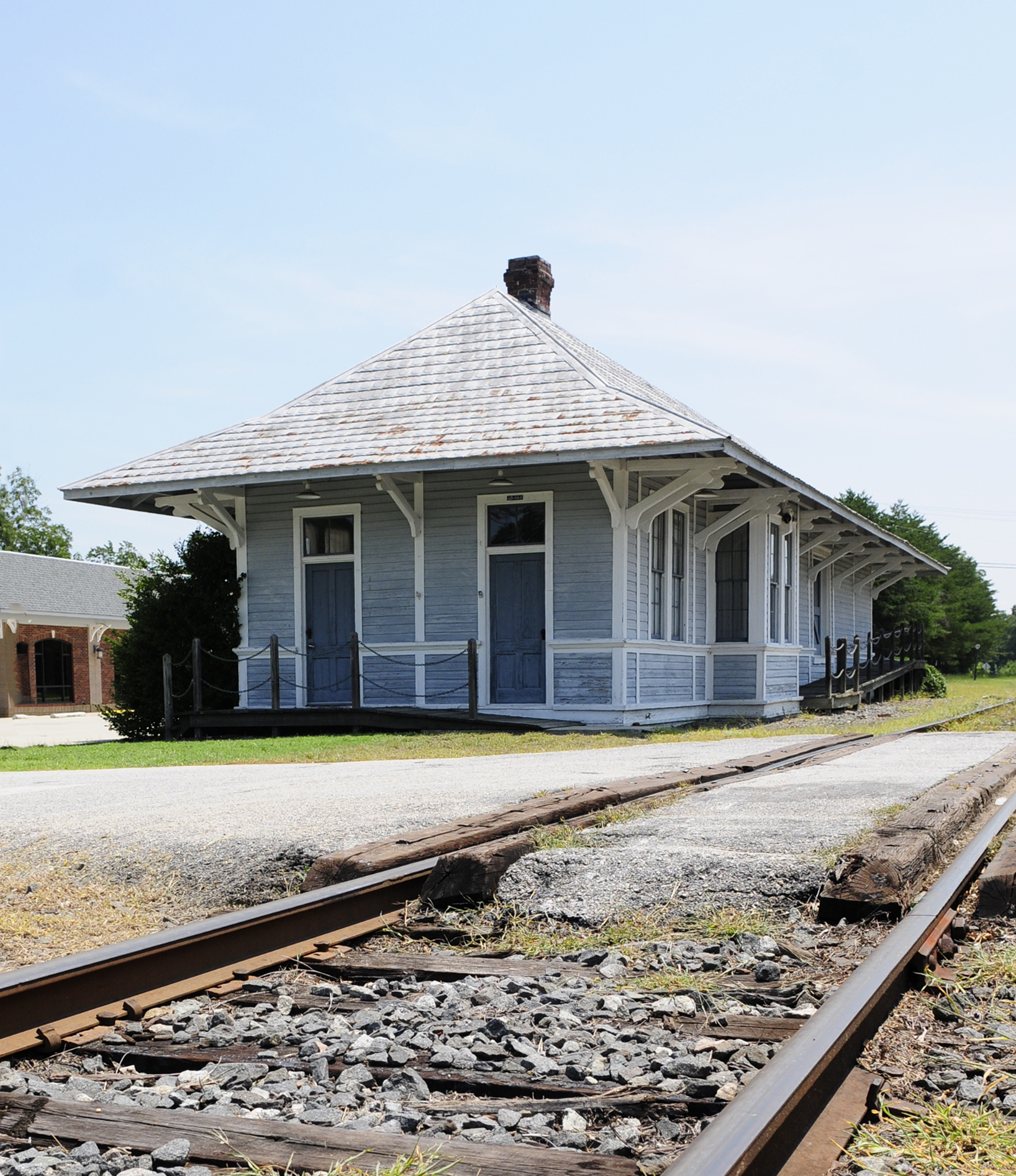
- Heath Springs Depot, August 2012

- Location within South Carolina Location within the United States
- Location: E. Railroad Ave., Heath Springs, South Carolina
- Coordinates: 34°35′39″N 80°40′30″W
- Area: less than one acre
- Built: 1903
- Architectural style: Late 19th And Early 20th Century American Movements
- MPS: Lancaster County MPS
- NRHP reference No.: 89002147
- Added to NRHP: January 4, 1990

Heath Springs Depot, also known as the Southern Railway Depot, is a historic train station located at Heath Springs, Lancaster County, South Carolina. It was built in 1903, by the Southern Railway. It was the third depot built at Heath Springs. It is a one-story frame building on a brick pier foundation and covered with shiplap siding.

It was added to the National Register of Historic Places in 1990.
