= Battle of Hanging Rock Historic Site =

- U.S. National Register of Historic Places
- Location within South Carolina Location within the United States
- Location: About 3.5 miles south of Heath Springs off U.S. Route 521, near Heath Springs, South Carolina
- Coordinates: 34°33′31″N 80°39′54″W
- Area: 370 acres (150 ha)
- Built: 1780
- NRHP reference No.: 74001860
- Added to NRHP: December 31, 1974

Battle of Hanging Rock Historic Site is a historic battle site commemorating the Battle of Hanging Rock during the American Revolutionary War and located near Heath Springs, Lancaster County, South Carolina. As part of a series of strongholds planned to maintain the British position in South Carolina, an outpost was established at Hanging Rock in 1780. The importance of this post was in its strategic location on the road from Camden to Charlotte. The first American attack on the post occurred on July 30, 1780, led by Major William Richardson Davie, with 40 dragoons and 40 mounted riflemen. On August 6, 1780, and after three hours of fighting, many of General Thomas Sumter’s men were unable to continue the battle. It was agreed to plunder the British camp and depart.

It was added to the National Register of Historic Places in 1974.

As of mid-2023, the American Battlefield Trust and its partners have preserved 172 acres of the battlefield.
