= George Stinney =

African American wrongfully convicted of murder (1929–1944)

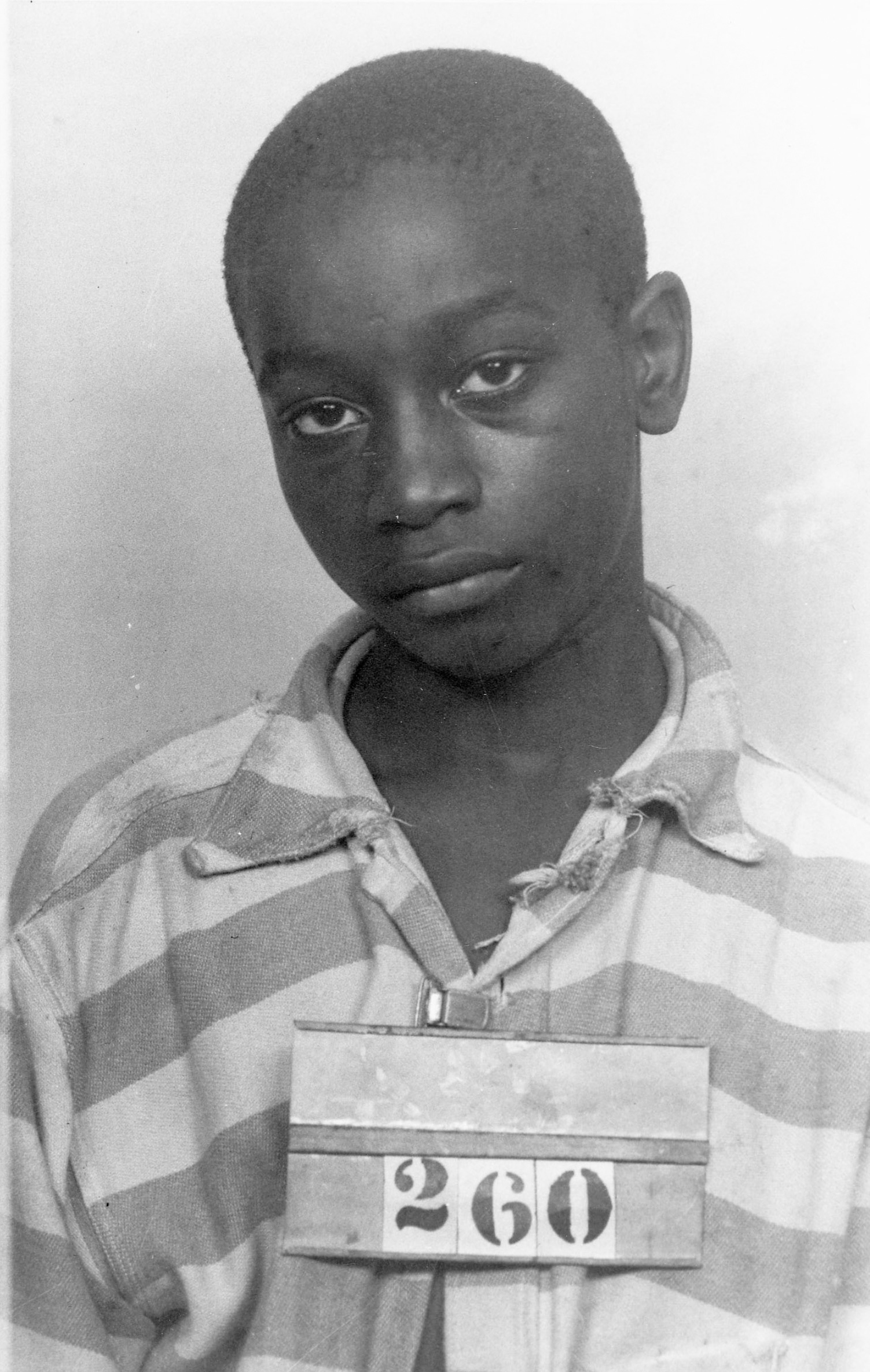
- Stinney's 1944 mugshot
- Born: George Junius Stinney Jr. October 21, 1929; Pinewood, South Carolina, U.S.
- Died: June 16, 1944 (aged 14); South Carolina Penitentiary, South Carolina, U.S.
- Resting place: Calvary Baptist Church Cemetery, Paxville, South Carolina, U.S.
- Monuments: Headstone memorial in Alcolu; Three memorial crosses dedicated to Stinney and other two victims where the bodies were found
- Known for: Being wrongfully executed
- Status: Executed by electrocution (June 16, 1944); Conviction vacated (December 16, 2014)
- Conviction: Murder (posthumously vacated)
- Penalty: Death

Details
- Date apprehended: March 23, 1944

George Junius Stinney Jr. (October 21, 1929 – June 16, 1944) was an African American boy who was wrongfully executed at the age of 14 after being convicted, during an unfair trial, for the murders of two white girls – 11-year-old Betty June Binnicker (December 9, 1932 – March 22, 1944) and 8-year-old Mary Emma Thames (March 14, 1936 – March 22, 1944) – in his hometown of Alcolu, South Carolina. He was tried, convicted, and sentenced to death on a single day in April 1944 and then executed by electric chair on June 16, 1944, after Governor Olin D. Johnston refused to grant him clemency.

A re-examination of Stinney's case began in 2004, and several individuals and the Northeastern University School of Law sought a judicial review. Stinney's murder conviction was vacated in 2014, with a South Carolina court ruling that he had not received a fair trial, and was thus wrongfully executed. Stinney is the youngest American with an exact known age confirmed to be both sentenced to death and executed in the 20th century.

== Background ==
In 1944, George Stinney stood 5 feet 1 inch (154 cm), and weighed 90–95 pounds (40–43 kg). He lived in a small home with a chicken coop in his hometown of Alcolu, South Carolina, with his father, George Junius Stinney, mother Aimé Brown Stinney, brother Charles Stinney, 12, and sisters Katherine Stinney, 10, and Aimé Stinney Ruffner, 7. He also had two older brothers, LeRoy Stinney, 21, and Johnny Stinney, 17, and an older sister, Carolina Stinney, 20.

Stinney's father worked at the town's sawmill, and the family resided in company housing. Alcolu was a small, working-class mill town. White and black neighborhoods were separated by railroad tracks, which was common for small Southern towns of the time. Given segregated schools and churches for white and black residents, there was limited interaction between them.

On March 23, 1944, the bodies of Betty June Binnicker and Mary Emma Thames were found in a ditch on the African-American side of Alcolu after the girls failed to return home the night before. Stinney's father assisted in the search. The girls had been beaten with a weapon, variously reported as a piece of blunt metal or a railroad spike. Each suffered severe blunt force trauma, resulting in penetration of both girls' skulls. According to a report by the medical examiner, these wounds had been "inflicted by a blunt instrument with a round head, about the size of a hammer." The medical examiner reported no evidence of sexual assault to the younger girl, though the genitalia of the older girl were slightly bruised.

The girls were last seen riding their bicycles looking for flowers. As they passed the Stinneys' property, they stopped to ask Stinney and his sister, Aimé, if they knew where to find "maypops", a local name for passionflowers. According to Aimé, she was with Stinney at the time the police later established the murders occurred. According to an article reported by the wire services on March 24, 1944, the sheriff announced the arrest of "George Junius" and stated that the boy had confessed and led officers to "a hidden piece of iron."

== Investigation ==
George and his older brother John were arrested on suspicion of murdering the girls. John was released by police, but George was held in custody. He was not allowed to see his parents until after his trial and conviction. According to a handwritten statement, his arresting officer was H.S. Newman, a Clarendon County deputy, who stated, "I arrested a boy by the name of George Stinney. He then made a confession and told me where to find a piece of iron, about 15 inches where he said he put it in a ditch about six feet from the bicycle."

In 1995, Stinney's seventh-grade teacher, W.L. Hamilton—a black man—spoke in an interview with The Sumter Item about George. Hamilton recounted, "I remember the day he killed those children, he got into a fight with a girl at school who was his neighbor. In those days you didn't have to worry about children carrying guns and knives to school, but George carried a little knife and he scratched this child with his knife. I took him outside and we went for a little walk, and I talked to him. We went back into the school, in a submissive way, he begged for the child's pardon." Stinney's sister, Aimé Ruffner, denied those allegations and contacted Hamilton after it was published. Aimé stated, "I asked him why he would say something like that," she said. "He told me someone paid him to say it. I don't know who paid him but his exact words were, 'because they paid me.'" Hamilton died shortly after his interview was published.

Following Stinney's arrest, his father was fired from his job at the local sawmill and the Stinney family had to immediately vacate their company housing. The family feared for their safety. He had no support during his 81-day confinement and trial; he was detained at a jail in Columbia, 50 miles (80 km) from Alcolu, due to the risk of lynching. Stinney was interrogated alone, without counsel or even his parents. Although the Sixth Amendment guarantees legal counsel, this was not routinely observed until the United States Supreme Court's 1963 ruling in Gideon v. Wainwright that explicitly required representation through the course of criminal proceedings.

== Trial ==
The entire proceeding against George Stinney, including jury selection, took place on April 24, 1944. Stinney's court-appointed counsel was Charles Plowden, a tax commissioner campaigning for election to local office. Plowden did not challenge the three police officers who testified that Stinney confessed to the two murders, nor did he try to defend Stinney. He also did not challenge the prosecution's presentation of two differing versions of Stinney's verbal confession. In one version, Stinney was attacked by the girls after he tried to help one girl who had fallen in the ditch, and he killed them in self defense. In the other version, he had followed the girls, first attacking Mary Emma and then Betty June. There is no written record of Stinney's confession apart from Deputy Newman's statement.

Other than the testimony of the three police officers, at trial prosecutors called three witnesses: Reverend Francis Batson, who discovered the bodies of the two girls, and the two doctors who performed the post-mortem examination. The court allowed discussion of the "possibility" of rape due to bruising on Binnicker's genitalia. Stinney's counsel did not call any witnesses, did not cross-examine witnesses, and offered little or no defense. The trial presentation lasted two and a half hours.

More than 1,000 white Americans crowded the courtroom, but no black Americans were allowed. As was typical at the time, Stinney was tried before an all-white jury (in 1944 most African-Americans in the South were disenfranchised and therefore not present on the rolls of those available to serve on juries). After deliberating for less than ten minutes, the jury found Stinney guilty of murder. Judge Philip H. Stoll sentenced Stinney to death by electrocution. There is no transcript of the trial and no appeal was filed by Stinney's counsel.

Stinney's family, churches, and the NAACP appealed to Governor Olin D. Johnston for clemency, given the age of the boy. Some pleas from whites came with affirmations of white supremacy, but disgust over the prospect of someone so young being executed. Others urged the governor to let the execution proceed, which he did. He visited George Stinney in the Death House two days before his execution, on June 14. Johnston wrote a response to one appeal for clemency, stating, "I have just talked with the officer who made the arrest in this case. It may be interesting for you to know that Stinney killed the smaller girl to rape the larger one. Then he killed the larger girl and raped her dead body. Twenty minutes later he returned and attempted to rape her again but her body was too cold. All of this he admitted himself." It was reported that these were merely rumors, and Johnston's claims were not corroborated by the girls' autopsies.

Between the time of Stinney's arrest and his execution, his parents were allowed to see him once after the trial, when he was held in the Columbia penitentiary. Under the threat of lynching, they were not allowed to see him any other time.

It is reported that Stinney confessed no fewer than thrice in the week prior to his execution, including once less than an hour prior to his execution. All three reported confessions were documented by contemporary newspapers. In a 2016 book, Next Stop, Eternity, the son of Stinney's chaplain, Reverend Charles M. "Red" Kelly, also wrote that Stinney had confessed to his father and fellow clergymen. Reverend Kelly met with Governor Johnston and urged him to spare Stinney's life on account of his age, but was unsuccessful.

Five days before the execution, Dr. J. Baxter Funderburk, a member of the South Carolina Board of Pardons who would visit all of the state's death row inmates, visited Stinney in prison. He reported that Stinney initially denied committing the murders, but then said he was guilty, albeit he said he did not know why he killed them. Stinney said the girls had asked him where he could find some flowers, after which he told them that they could find honeysuckle in the woods. Shortly after, he followed them and beat them to death, killing the younger girl first. Funderburk reported that Stinney said he used an iron rod about 12 inches long and about "as thick as his thumb."

Two days later, Stinney was reported to have confessed again, this time to the penitentiary's captain of the guard. He said he had killed the younger girl first and used a "piece of iron" to commit the murders.

An execution of a child as young as 14 was rare, but not unheard of in United States history. Many sources say that Stinney was the youngest person executed in the U.S. in the 20th century. However, this may be incorrect. There are recorded executions of a 14-year-old boy in North Carolina in 1914 who was erroneously listed as 18, a 14-year-old boy in South Carolina in 1921 who was erroneously listed as 16, and of a 14-year-old boy in Florida in 1910 who was erroneously listed as 15.

== Execution ==
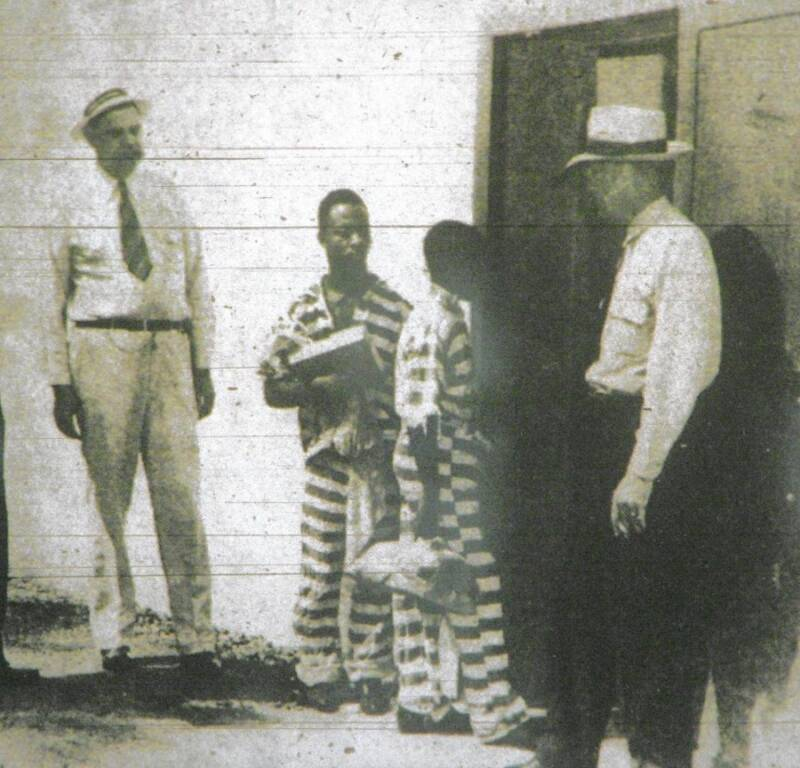
George Stinney (second from right) being led to the execution chamber

Stinney was executed on Friday, June 16, 1944, at 7:30 a.m. He was prepared for execution by electric chair. Stinney was reported to have made his last confession less than 30 minutes before his execution. The sheriff of Clarendon County talked to Stinney, who said Stinney told him that he was guilty and had acted alone.

Stinney was then restrained by his arms, legs, and body to the chair. An officer asked Stinney if he had any last words to say before the execution took place, but he only shook his head and said "No, sir." The executioner pulled a strap from the chair and placed it over Stinney's mouth. When the lethal electricity was applied, the mask covering slipped off, revealing that his eyes were wide open. The perception that Stinney was sobbing at his execution or that a stack of books was needed to place him in the chair was later contested by Terri Evans, the niece of Mary Emma Thames' mother, Lula Mae. Terri's uncle, Clyde Barnes, witnessed the execution. Barnes told Evans' father what he saw during the execution, which was then relayed to her years later. Her father stated that Barnes "said it was just a rumor that the hood had slipped and they did not put a stack of books under him." Stinney was buried in an unmarked grave at the Calvary Baptist Church Cemetery in Lee County, South Carolina.

== Reopening of case and vacatur of conviction ==
In 2004, George Frierson, a local historian who grew up in Alcolu, started researching the case after reading a newspaper article about it. His work gained the attention of South Carolina lawyers Steve McKenzie and Matt Burgess. In addition, Ray Brown, attorney James Moon, and others contributed countless hours of research and review of historical documents, and found witnesses and evidence to assist in exonerating Stinney. Among those who aided the case were the Civil Rights and Restorative Justice Project (CRRJ) at the Northeastern University School of Law, which filed an amicus brief with the court in 2014. Frierson and the pro bono lawyers first sought relief through the Pardon and Parole Board of South Carolina.

McKenzie and Burgess, along with attorney Ray Chandler representing Stinney's family, filed a motion for a new trial on October 25, 2013.

If we can get the case re-opened, we can go to the judge and say, 'There wasn't any reason to convict this child. There was no evidence to present to the jury. There was no transcript. This case needs to be re-opened. This is an injustice that needs to be righted.' I'm pretty optimistic that if we can get the witnesses we need to come forward, we will be successful in court. We hopefully have a witness that's going to say—that's non-family, non-relative witness—who is going to be able to tie all this in and say that they were basically an alibi witness. They were there with Mr. Stinney and this did not occur.

— Steve McKenzie

Frierson stated in interviews, "There has been a person that has been named as being the culprit, who is now deceased. And it was said by the family that there was a deathbed confession." Frierson said that the rumored culprit came from a well-known, prominent white family. A member, or members, of that family had served on the initial coroner's inquest jury, which had recommended that Stinney be prosecuted.

In its amicus brief, the CRRJ said:

There is compelling evidence that George Stinney was innocent of the crimes for which he was executed in 1944. The prosecutor relied, almost exclusively, on one piece of evidence to obtain a conviction in this capital case: the unrecorded, unsigned "confession" of a 14-year-old who was deprived of counsel and parental guidance, and whose defense lawyer shockingly failed to call exculpating witnesses or to preserve his right of appeal.

New evidence in the court hearing in January 2014 included testimony by Stinney's siblings that he was with them at the time of the murders. In addition, an affidavit was introduced from the "Reverend Francis Batson, who found the girls and pulled them from the water-filled ditch. In his statement he recalls there was not much blood in or around the ditch, suggesting that they may have been killed elsewhere and moved." Wilford "Johnny" Hunter, who was in prison with Stinney, "testified that the teenager told him he had been made to confess" and always maintained his innocence. The solicitor for the state of South Carolina, who argued for the state against exoneration, was Ernest A. Finney III. He is the son of Ernest A. Finney Jr., who was appointed as South Carolina's first African-American State Supreme Court justice since Reconstruction.

Rather than approving a new trial, on December 16, 2014, circuit court Judge Carmen Mullen vacated Stinney's conviction. She ruled that he had not received a fair trial, as he was not effectively defended and his Sixth Amendment rights had been violated. The ruling was a rare use of the legal remedy of coram nobis (a legal order allowing a court to correct its original judgment upon discovery of a fundamental error that did not appear in the records of the original judgment's proceedings and that would have prevented the judgment from being pronounced). Judge Mullen ruled that his confession was likely coerced and thus inadmissible. She also found the execution of a 14-year-old constituted "cruel and unusual punishment", and that his attorney "failed to call exculpating witnesses or to preserve his right of appeal." Mullen confined her judgment to the process of the prosecution, noting that Stinney "may well have committed this crime." With reference to the legal process, Mullen wrote, "No one can justify a 14-year-old child charged, tried, convicted and executed in some 80 days," concluding that, "In essence, not much was done for this child when his life lay in the balance."

=== Reaction of Binnicker and Thames's relatives ===
While Stinney's family and civil rights advocates celebrated the overturning of Stinney's conviction, relatives of both Betty Binnicker and Mary Thames expressed disappointment at the court's ruling. They said that although they acknowledge Stinney's execution at the age of 14 is controversial, they never doubted his guilt. Binnicker's niece claimed she and her family have extensively researched the case, and argues that "people who [just] read these articles in the newspaper don't know the truth." She alleges that, in the early 1990s, a police officer who had arrested Stinney had contacted her and said, "Don't you ever believe that boy didn't kill your aunt." These family members contend that the claims of a deathbed confession from an individual confessing to the girls' murders have never been substantiated. Commenting on the public opinion regarding Stinney's case, she said that the case has always been "one-sided" and that Stinney has been incorrectly portrayed as a "poor pitiful little black boy". At the same time, another niece of Binnicker, while remaining convinced of Stinney's guilt, agreed that Stinney did not receive a fair trial and that he should not have received the death penalty, adding that she felt bad for Stinney and his family and that she hoped they eventually would find peace. A childhood acquaintance of Binnicker also stated, "I'm sorry that they electrocuted him. I wish they had just sent him to prison."

=== Alternate suspect ===
Since Stinney's exoneration, George Washington Burke Jr. (1917–1947) the son of a wealthy white businessman, George Burke Sr., has been the subject of speculation as a possible suspect for the murders. George Burke Jr. died two to three years after the murders of the two girls, in 1947, at age 29. Stinney's mother had worked for the Burke family for a brief period. Stinney's sister recalled an occasion when her mother came home accusing Burke Sr. of attempting to sexually harass her, and noted that Stinney's father had warned her not to return there. Stinney's sister claimed to have heard that the Burke boys had framed Stinney because "[their] mother didn't want to give it up." Burke Sr. conducted an initial search for the girls and was the owner of the territory behind Greenhill Baptist Church where the girls' bodies were found. He was also the foreman of the grand jury that indicted Stinney, and has been accused of helping steer the blame off of his son and onto Stinney. Two elderly women in Alcolu recalled that Burke Jr. was known as a womanizer and for committing theft and getting away with it.

Sonya Eaddy-Williamson, a white Alcolu resident who grew close to Stinney's sisters, investigated the case. According to her, George Burke Jr.'s son, Wayne Burke, told her that his grandmother had told him that his father had picked the girls up in his lumber truck by his grandmother's house on the day of the girls' murders. In 2017, Wayne Burke denied saying this and said he remained convinced of Stinney's guilt. Stinney's sister had previously recalled that after the two girls had asked about maypop flowers, a lumber truck drove down the road. Lawyers for the Stinney family have stated that there had been rumors of a deathbed confession to the murders by a member of a prominent white family; however, this has never been proven.

== Legacy ==
George Stinney's case has been frequently referred to in debate over the use of the death penalty in the United States, especially in arguments against the death penalty, due to Stinney having been innocent and wrongfully executed.

In January 2022, South Carolina state representative Cezar McKnight introduced a bill named after Stinney, the George Stinney Fund, which would make the state of South Carolina pay $10 million to the families of the wrongfully executed if their conviction is posthumously overturned.

== Books and films about Stinney's case ==
- David Stout based his first novel, Carolina Skeletons (1988), on the Stinney case. He was awarded the 1989 Edgar Award for Best First Novel (Edgar Allan Poe Award). Stout suggests in the novel that Stinney, whom he renames Linus Bragg, was innocent. The plot revolves around a fictitious brother of Stinney/Bragg, who unravels the truth about the case decades later. The novel was adapted as a 1991 television movie of the same name directed by John Erman, featuring Kenny Blank as Stinney/Bragg. Lou Gossett Jr. played Stinney's/Bragg's younger brother James.
- The 1993 novel Billy by Albert French was inspired by these events.
- The 1996 Stephen King novel The Green Mile was loosely based on Stinney's story. Like Stinney, the character John Coffey is an African American who is wrongfully executed for the rape and murder of two white twin girls. It is eventually revealed that another character is the actual killer.
- In February 2014, another movie about the Stinney case, 83 Days, was announced by Pleroma Studios, written and produced by Ray Brown with Charles Burnett slated to direct. Ultimately directed by Andrew Paul Howell, the film was released in 2018.
- An opera, Stinney: An American Execution, was written in 2015 by Frances Pollock, who had just earned her master's degree at the Peabody Institute. It was performed to a full house at 2640 Space in Baltimore, Maryland the same year. Several cousins of George Stinney from Baltimore and other parts of Maryland attended the opening night. In 2022, Opera Grand Rapids in Grand Rapids Michigan produced the world premiere of Stinney: An American Execution at The Wege Theater.
- Karyn Parsons' How High the Moon has a subplot where a friend of the main character is framed for murdering two white girls, similarly to the George Stinney case.
- Jericho Brown's 2021 poem "Inaugural" makes reference to Stinney's execution.
- Nia DaCosta's 2021 film Candyman features Stinney in a cameo as one of the souls trapped in the Candyman "hive": in his Candyman form, Stinney rides a bicycle with his hand in a hook. Stinney was previously featured in DaCosta's 2020 promotional short film of the same name, his death and resurrection depicted in the form of shadow puppetry.
- Filmmaker Jamison Stalsworth's short film The Current: The Story of George Stinney was released in 2017.
- George Stinney is cited in Chain-Gang All Stars, a novel by Nana Kwame Adjei-Brenyah, as the youngest person ever executed by the United States. The novel incorrectly states that George Stinney was exonerated seventy years after his execution, instead of correctly stating that his conviction was vacated.

== See also ==
- List of people executed in South Carolina
- List of people executed in the United States in 1944
- List of wrongful convictions in the United States
- Hannah Ocuish, twelve-year-old girl believed to be the youngest person to be executed in the United States
- Emmett Till
- Jesse Pomeroy, youngest person convicted of murder in Massachusetts
- Thomas Granger, sixteen-year-old boy who was the first documented juvenile to be executed on United States territory
- Steven Truscott
- James Arcene, ten-year-old boy believed to be the youngest person to be given a death sentence in the United States
- Wrongful executions in the United States
- Capital punishment for juveniles in the United States
- Roper v. Simmons
- List of people executed by electrocution
