= Alcolu, South Carolina =

- Census-designated place
- Location within South Carolina Location within the United States
- Coordinates: 33°45′04″N 80°12′51″W
- Country: United States
- State: South Carolina
- County: Clarendon

Area
  - Total: 4.57 sq mi (11.84 km^{2})
  - Land: 4.55 sq mi (11.78 km^{2})
  - Water: 0.023 sq mi (0.06 km^{2})
- Elevation: 125 ft (38 m)

Population (2020)
  - Total: 402
  - Density: 88.4/sq mi (34.12/km^{2})
- Time zone: UTC-5 (Eastern (EST))
  - Summer (DST): UTC-4 (EDT)
- ZIP code: 29001
- Area codes: 803, 839
- GNIS feature ID: 2629817

Alcolu is an unincorporated community and census-designated place (CDP) in Clarendon County, South Carolina, United States. As of the 2020 census, its population was 402. Alcolu has a post office with ZIP code 29001, which opened on August 17, 1888. It developed as a lumber and mill town.

== History ==
=== Early history ===
Alcolu was established between 1885 and 1890 by D.W. Alderman as a company mill town for his timber company and lumber mill. The name Alcolu is derived from "AL" for Alderman, "CO" for Algernon Coldwell, a friend and brother-in-law, and "LU" for Lula, Alderman's daughter.

When it was built, Alcolu was a company town where many residents worked for businesses operated by D.W. Alderman & Sons. The business grew to include logging operations, a saw mill, planing mill, hosiery mill, flooring mill, farming, cattle ranching, a cotton gin, hotel, company store, and other businesses. Over time, the company helped found schools and churches, and built baseball fields, an electric plant, and a telephone system for the town. D.W. Alderman also founded the Alcolu and Paroda railroads and built the Alcolu railroad depot. The Alcolu Post Office was established on August 17, 1888, and Coldwell was appointed as its first postmaster.

Company employees were paid in "babbits", metal coins stamped with an "A", which could be used only in the company store. In 1919, the company opened the "Alderman 20 Stores in One" in nearby Manning, South Carolina. It was one of the first department stores in South Carolina and was described as having the first elevator in town.

=== George Stinney case ===
On March 22, 1944, two white girls, 11-year-old Betty June Binnicker and 7-year-old Mary Emma Thames, were murdered in Alcolu. George Stinney, a 14-year-old black boy, was convicted of their murders and became the youngest person with an exact birth date confirmed to be executed in the United States in the 20th century. Stinney's murder conviction was posthumously vacated in 2014, with Judge Carmen Mullen finding that he had not received a fair trial.

=== Post-war history ===
In 1947, the Alderman family sold the lumber mill to the Southern Coatings & Chemical Company and the Williams Furniture Company. They were bought in 1968 by Georgia-Pacific. Georgia-Pacific continued its operations in Alcolu until 2000, when the mill closed. According to the 2020 census, Alcolu had a population of 402 people.

== Geography ==
Alcolu is located in northern Clarendon County, 4 miles (6 km) north of Manning, the county seat. The southern edge of the CDP follows Interstate 95, which provides access at Exit 122. I-95 leads northeast 44 miles (71 km) to Florence and southwest 24 miles (39 km) to Santee. U.S. Route 521 runs through Alcolu, leading south to Manning and northwest 16 miles (26 km) to Sumter.

According to the U.S. Census Bureau, the Alcolu CDP has a total area of 4.57 square miles (11.84 km^{2}), of which 4.55 square miles (11.78 km^{2}) is land and 0.02 square miles (0.06 km^{2}), or 0.47%, is water.

== Demographics ==
Historical population
Census	Pop.	Note	%±
2010	429		—
2020	402		−6.3%
U.S. Decennial Census

== Education ==
The school district is Clarendon School District 2.

== Notable people ==
- Pressley Harvin III, punter for the Pittsburgh Steelers (2021–23).
- George Stinney Jr., African-American teenager who was wrongfully convicted and executed.
