= List of U.S. Highways in South Carolina =

U.S. Highways of South Carolina
- Highway marker for U.S. Highways in South Carolina

System information
- Maintained by SCDOT
- Formed: November 11, 1926

Highway names
- US Highways: U.S. Highway nn (US nn)

System links
- South Carolina State Highway System; Interstate; US; State; Scenic

There are 23 U.S. Highways that exist entirely or partially in the U.S. state of South Carolina. In South Carolina, all U.S. Highways are maintained by the South Carolina Department of Transportation (SCDOT).

== Mainline highways ==
Number	Length (mi)	Length (km)	Southern or western terminus	Northern or eastern terminus	Formed	Removed	Notes
US 1	170.540	274.458	US 1 / US 25 / US 78 / US 278 / SR 10 / SR 121 / SC 121 at the Georgia state line south of North Augusta	US 1 at the North Carolina state line near Wallace	1926	current	Travels north-south along the sandhills region; connecting the cities of North Augusta, Aiken, Columbia, and Camden. South of Camden, it parallels with I-20.
US 15	158.832	255.615	US 17 Alt. in Walterboro	US 15 / US 401 in North Carolina state line at McColl	1935	current	Travels north-south, connecting the cities of Walterboro, Sumter, and Bennettsville.
US 17	221.454	356.396	US 17 / SR 404 Spur at the Georgia state line near Limehouse	US 17 at the North Carolina state line near Little River	1927	current	Travels north-south along the coastal plain area, connecting the cities of Hardeeville, Charleston, Georgetown, and Myrtle Beach.
US 21	245.480	395.062	Hunting Island State Park	I-77 / US 21 at the North Carolina state line near Fort Mill	1926	current	Travels north-south, connecting the cities of Beaufort, Orangeburg, Columbia, and Rock Hill. North of Columbia, it parallels with I-77.
US 25	140.600	226.274	US 1 / US 25 / US 78 / US 278 / SR 10 / SR 121 / SC 121 at the Georgia state line south of North Augusta	US 25 at the North Carolina state line near Travelers Rest	1926	current	Travels north-south in the western part of the state, connecting the cities of North Augusta, Greenwood, and Greenville.
US 29	110.202	177.353	US 29 / SR 8 at the Georgia state line near Holland Store	US 29 at the North Carolina state line northeast of Blacksburg	1927	current	Travels north-south in the Upstate area, parallel to I-85. It connects the cities of Anderson, Greenville, and Spartanburg.
US 52	159.960	257.431	Line Street in Charleston	US 52 at the North Carolina state line near Cheraw	1935	current	Travels north-south, connecting the cities of Charleston, Lake City, Florence, and Darlington.
US 76	314.985	506.919	US 76 / SR 2 at the Georgia state line near Westminster	US 76 at the North Carolina state line near Nichols	1926	current	Longest US Highway in the state, going east-west; it connects the cities Anderson, Columbia, Sumter, and Florence.
US 78	142.207	228.860	US 1 / US 25 / US 78 / US 278 / SR 10 / SR 121 / SC 121 at the Georgia state line near North Augusta	Line Street in Charleston	1926	current	Travels east-west, connecting the cities of North Augusta, Aiken, Bamberg, and Charleston.
US 117	45.0	72.4	Conway	US 117 at the North Carolina state line near Little River	1932	1935	Replaced by US 501 and US 17.
US 123	65.240	104.994	US 123 / SR 365 at the Georgia state line near Westminster	I-385 Bus. in Greenville	1968	current	Travels north-south in the Upstate area, connecting the cities of Westminster and Greenville.
US 176	230.760	371.372	US 176 at the North Carolina state line near Landrum	US 52 / Red Bank Road in Goose Creek	1926	current	Travels east-west, parallel to I-26. It connects the cities of Spartanburg, Union, and Columbia.
US 178	233.390	375.605	US 178 at the North Carolina state line near Rocky Bottom	U.S. Route 78 in South Carolina east of Dorchester	1932	current	Travels east-west, connecting the cities of Anderson, Greenwood, and Orangeburg.
US 217	24.4	39.3	Pee Dee	US 217 at the North Carolina state line near Dillon	1927	1932	Replaced by US 301.
US 221	126.390	203.405	US 221 / SC 150 at the Georgia state line near Clarks Hill	US 221 at the North Carolina state line near Chesnee	1932	current	Travels north-south within the Piedmont area, connecting the cities of Greenwood and Spartanburg.
US 276	44.469	71.566	US 276 at the North Carolina state line near Cleveland	I-185 / I-385 in Mauldin	1932	current	Shortest US Highway in the state, going east-west; it goes through the city of Greenville.
US 278	146.130	235.173	US 1 / US 25 / US 78 / US 278 / SR 10 / SR 121 / SC 121 at the Georgia state line south of North Augusta	US 278 Bus. / Greenwood Drive / Pope Avenue in Hilton Head Island	1965	current	Travels east-west, connecting the cities of North Augusta and Hilton Head Island.
US 301	189.704	305.299	US 301 / SR 73 at the Georgia state line near Allendale	I-95 / US 301 / US 501 at the North Carolina state line near Dillon	1932	current	Travels north-south, loosely parallel to I-95. It connects the cities of Orangeburg, Florence, and Dillon.
US 321	217.550	350.113	US 17 in Hardeeville	US 321 at the North Carolina state line near Clover	1930	current	Travels north-south, connecting the cities of Hardeeville, Columbia, and York.
US 378	210.310	338.461	US 378 / SR 43 at the Georgia state line near McCormick	US 501 Bus. in Conway	1952	current	Travels east-west, connecting the cities of Columbia, Sumter, and Conway.
US 401	77.760	125.143	US 76 Bus. in Sumter	US 401 at the North Carolina state line near McColl	1957	current	Travels north-south, connecting the cities of Sumter, Darlington, and Bennettsville.
US 501	73.770	118.721	US 17 Bus. in Myrtle Beach	I-95 / US 301 / US 501 at the North Carolina state line near Dillon	1935	current	Travels north-south through the Grand Strand area, connecting the cities of Myrtle Beach, Conway, and Dillon.
US 521	172.820	278.127	US 17 in Georgetown	US 521 at the North Carolina state line at Indian Land	1932	current	Travels north-south, connecting the cities of Georgetown, Sumter, Camden, and Lexington.
US 601	183.370	295.105	US 321 in Tarboro	US 601 at the North Carolina state line at Pageland	1927	current	Travels north-south, connecting the cities of Bamberg, Orangeburg, Camden, and Pageland.
US 701	61.670	99.248	US 17 / US 17 Alt. in Georgetown	US 701 at the North Carolina state line near Loris	1932	current	Travels north-south through the Grand Strand area, connecting the cities of Georgetown and Conway.
Former

== Special routes ==
Number	Length (mi)	Length (km)	Southern or western terminus	Northern or eastern terminus	Formed	Removed	Notes
US 1 Truck	8.440	13.583	US 1 / US 78 / US 78 Truck / SC 19 Truck / SC 118 in Aiken	US 78 / US 78 Truck / SC 4 Truck / SC 302 east of Aiken	—	—	
US 1 Conn.	0.230	0.370	US 1 / SC 6 in Lexington	SC 6 in Lexington	—	—	Unsigned; southbound only; completely concurrent with the eastbound lanes of SC 6
US 1 Conn.	0.080	0.129	SC 16 in Columbia	US 1 in Columbia	—	—	Unsigned
US 1 Truck	1.540	2.478	US 521 / US 521 Truck / SC 34 Truck in Camden	US 1 / US 521 Truck / SC 34 / SC 34 Truck in Camden	—	—	
US 1 Truck	3.230	5.198	US 1 / US 52 / US 52 Truck south of Cheraw	US 1 / US 52 / US 52 Truck / SC 9 / SC 9 Truck in Cheraw	—	—	Completely concurrent with US 52 Truck
US 15 Alt.	—	—	Walterboro	North Carolina state line near McColl	1937	1946	The entire route was in concurrency with US 15 in South Carolina.
US 15 Conn.	2.140	3.444	US 15 / US 301 southwest of Santee	SC 6 in Santee	—	—	Unsigned
US 15 Conn.	2.140	3.444	US 301 in Summerton	US 15 in Summerton	—	—	Unsigned
US 15 Alt.	—	—	Sumter	Society Hill	1955	1957	Replaced by US 401.
US 15 Conn.	0.340	0.547	US 15 on the Sumter–South Sumter line	US 521 on the Sumter–South Sumter line	—	—	Unsigned
US 15 Bus.	6.500	10.461	US 15 south of Hartsville	US 15 south of Hartsville	—	—	
US 15 Bus.	—	—	US 15 west of Bennettsville	US 15 east of Bennettsville	1952	1990	Was routed along Main Street and Tyson Avenue, in concurrency with US 401 Bus. It was replaced by SC 385.
US 17 Alt.	6.7	10.8	US 17 Alt. / SR 25 Alt. at the Georgia state line near Limehouse	US 17 near Limehouse	1955	1994	Provided an alternate route from Savannah, via the Talmadge Memorial Bridge. Was reassigned as mainline US 17
US 17 Alt.	123.900	199.398	US 17 / US 21 northeast of Pocotaligo	US 17 / US 701 in Georgetown	1952	current	Travels north–south, connecting the cities of Walterboro, Summerville, Moncks Corner, and Georgetown.
US 17 Conn.	0.270	0.435	Yemassee Highway in Yemassee	US 17 Alt. / US 21 / SC 68 in Yemassee	—	—	Unsigned
US 17 Alt. Truck	8.242	13.264	US 17 Alt. / SC 642 southwest of Summerville	US 17 Alt. / SC 165 / Berkely Circle in Summerville	—	—	
US 17 Bus.	4.2	6.8	US 17 / US 701 / US 701 Bus. northwest of Mount Pleasant	US 17 / US 701 / US 701 Bus. northeast of Mount Pleasant	1967	1992	Was routed along Coleman Boulevard and Georgetown Highway (Chuck Dawley Boulevard); completely concurrent with US 701 Bus. It was replaced by SC 703 and BS 526.
US 17 Bus.	22.940	36.918	US 17 in Murrells Inlet	US 17 in Myrtle Beach	1967	current	Connects the downtown areas of Murrells Inlet, Garden City, Surfside Beach and Myrtle Beach.
US 21 Bus.	5.400	8.690	US 21 / SC 802 in Beaufort	US 21 in Burton	1967	current	Routed along Sea Island Parkway, Carteret Street and Boundary Street
US 21 Bus.	3.3	5.3	Orangeburg	Orangeburg	1950	1967	Was routed along Broughton Street (in concurrency with US 178 Bus.) and Columbia Road
US 21 Bus.	2.730	4.394	US 21 / US 601 Truck / SC 4 in Orangeburg	US 21 / US 178 / US 601 in Orangeburg	1967	current	Routed along Rowesville Road, Charleston Highway, and Magnolia Street
US 21 Conn.	2.730	4.394	US 178 Bus. in Orangeburg	US 21 / US 178 in Orangeburg	—	—	Unsigned
US 21 Conn.	0.850	1.368	US 21 / US 176 / US 321 in West Columbia	US 1 in West Columbia	—	—	Unsigned
US 21 Conn.	2.930	4.715	US 21 / US 76 Conn. / US 176 / US 321 / SC 48 Truck in Columbia	US 76 / US 76 Conn. / US 378 in Columbia	—	—	Unsigned; completely concurrent with the western segment of US 76 Conn.
US 21 Conn.	1.660	2.672	US 21 southeast of Ridgeway	SC 34 northwest of Ridgeway	—	—	Unsigned
US 21 Bus.	6.7	10.8	Rock Hill	Rock Hill	1950	2013	Was routed along Main Street, Albright Road, Black Street, Oakland Avenue, and Cherry Road, through downtown Rock Hill. It was decommissioned at the request of Rock Hill to gain ownership and maintenance oversight.
US 21 Bus.	7.060	11.362	SC 160 in Fort Mill	US 21 north of Fort Mill	1948	current	It is routed along Spratt Street, White Street, Old Nations Road, and Springfield Parkway, through downtown Fort Mill
US 25 Bus.	2.900	4.667	US 25 Alt. / SR 4 at the Georgia state line in North Augusta	US 25 in North Augusta	1961	current	Only business loop that crosses the Georgia state line
US 25 Conn.	0.550	0.885	Dead end in North Augusta	US 25 / SC 121 in North Augusta	—	—	Unsigned
US 25 Bus.	3.700	5.955	US 25 / US 25 Truck in Edgefield	US 25 / US 25 Truck / SC 23 Truck north of Edgefield	—	—	Is, in fact, US 25 signed as a business route
US 25 Truck	3.980	6.405	US 25 in Edgefield	US 25 / SC 23 Truck north of Edgefield	—	—	Is, in fact, a secondary road signed as a truck route
US 25 Bus.	4.840	7.789	US 25 / US 178 / US 221 in Greenwood	US 25 / US 178 / SC 72 in Greenwood	1969	current	
US 25 Bus.	4.310	6.936	US 25 / SC 252 Truck southeast of Ware Shoals	US 25 / SC 252 / SC 252 Truck north of Ware Shoals	1963	current	
US 25 Bus.	—	—	Greenville	Greenville	1969	1995	Former business loop through downtown Greenville; replaced in parts by US 123, US 276, SC 20 and SC 291.
US 25 Conn.	1.100	1.770	US 276 / McElhaney Road in Travelers Rest	US 25 in Travelers Rest	—	—	Unsigned
US 29 Bus.	6.438	10.361	US 29 on the Homeland Park–Green Acres line	US 29 in Anderson	—	—	
US 29 Conn.	3.520	5.665	US 29 near Williamston	SC 20 in Williamston	—	—	
US 29 Alt.	—	—	US 29 in Greenville	US 29 in Greenville	1938	1948	Was an alternate route through downtown Greenville; was downgraded to secondary roads.
US 29 Bus.	—	—	US 29 in Greenville	US 29 in Greenville	1958	1962	
US 29 Spur	0.110	0.177	US 29 in Greenvillw	US 276 in Greenville	—	—	Unsigned
US 29 Conn.	0.250	0.402	US 276 in Greenvillw	US 29 in Greenville	—	—	Unsigned
US 29 Conn.	0.120	0.193	SC 291 / Edwards Road on the Greenville–Wade Hampton line	US 29 in Wade Hampton	—	—	Unsigned
US 29 Conn.	0.34	0.55	US 29 in Spartanburg	SC 296 in Spartanburg	2013	2016	
US 29 Alt.	—	—	US 29 in Spartanburg	US 29 in Blacksburg	1954	1962	Was a redesignation of mainline US 29 between Spartanburg and Blacksburg; after I-85 was established, it was reverted to US 29.
US 52 Spur	2.980	4.796	East Bay Street / Broad Street in Charleston	US 52 / Mount Pleasant Street in Charleston	—	—	Unsigned
US 52 Conn.	0.900	1.448	I-26 in North Charleston	US 52 / US 78 in North Charleston	—	—	Unsigned
US 52 Truck	4.780	7.693	US 52 / US 301 / West 3rd Loop Road in Florence	US 52 in Florence	—	—	
US 52 Conn.	1.070	1.722	US 52 / US 76 in Florence	US 52 in Florence	—	—	Unsigned
US 52 Bus.	4.508	7.255	US 52 / SC 34 Truck in Darlington	US 52 / US 401 near Darlington	1974	current	
US 52 Truck	3.550	5.713	US 1 / US 1 Truck / US 52 / Manor Road south of Cheraw	US 52 / SC 9 Truck in Cheraw	2002	current	
US 76 Bus.	—	—	Seneca	Seneca	1958	2000	
US 76 Bus.	3.910	6.293	US 76 / Ashley Lane in Laurens	US 76 / US 221 Truck / SC 127 in Laurens	1982	current	
US 76 Bus.	—	—	Newberry	Newberry	1952	2001	
US 76 Conn.	4.440	7.145	US 21 / US 21 Conn. / US 176 / US 321 / SC 48 Truck in Columbia SC 16 in Columbia SC 16 in Columbia	US 21 Conn. / US 76 / US 378 in Columbia US 76 / US 378 / SC 760 in Columbia SC 760 in Columbia	—	—	Unsigned
US 76 Bus.	5.910	9.511	US 76 / US 378 in Sumter	US 76 / US 378 in Sumter	1959	current	
US 76 Conn.	0.140	0.225	I-20 Bus. / West Evans Street in Florence	US 76 in Florence	—	—	Unsigned
US 78 Truck	8.440	13.583	US 1 / US 1 Truck / US 78 / SC 19 Truck / SC 118 in Aiken	US 1 Truck / US 78 / SC 4 Truck / SC 302 east of Aiken	—	—	Completely cocurrent with US 1 Truck
US 78 Bus.	0.530	0.853	SC 3 in Blackville	US 78 in Blackville	1981	current	Inventoried by SCDOT as US 78 Conn.; signed west of SC 3, but is inventoried by SCDOT as only using these termini
US 78 Conn.	0.530	0.853	SC 3 in Blackville	US 78 in Blackville	—	—	Is, in fact, the official designation of the signed US 78 Bus.
US 78 Conn.	0.140	0.225	SC 61 northwest of Farrell Crossroads	US 78 near Farrell Crossroads	—	—	Unsigned
US 123 Bus.	—	—	Seneca	Seneca	1958	2000	Was routed along North First Street.
US 123 Bus.	—	—	Easley	Easley	1958	1964	Was routed along Main Street and Liberty Drive; replaced by SC 93
US 123 Conn.	0.740	1.191	SC 93 in Easley	US 123 in Easley	—	—	
US 123 Alt.	—	—	Greenville	Greenville	1950	1972	Replaced by SC 124.
US 176 Alt.	—	—	US 176 in Spartanburg	US 176 in Spartanburg	1938	1948	Traversed downtown Spartanburg, along Magnolia and Howard streets; some map inserts of the time list it as "Optional US 176"; was downgraded to secondary roads.
US 176 Conn.	0.520	0.837	US 221 in Spartanburg	I-585 / US 176 / SC 9 in Spartanburg	—	—	Unsigned
US 176 Conn.	0.360	0.579	US 221 in Spartanburg	I-585 / US 176 / SC 9 north of Spartanburg	—	—	Unsigned
US 176 Bus.	—	—	US 176 in Union	US 176 in Union	1958	1990	Was routed along Pinckney Street and Thompson Boulevard; replaced by SC 18
US 176 Conn.	0.460	0.740	US 176 / SC 18 Truck in Union	SC 18 / SC 18 Truck in Union	—	—	Unsigned; completely concurrent with SC 18 Truck
US 176 Conn.	0.340	0.547	SC 72 / Douglas Street in Whitmire	US 176 in Whitmire	—	—	Unsigned
US 178 Conn.	0.180	0.290	US 76 / SC 28 / SC 28 Bus. in Northlake	US 178 in Northlake	—	—	Unsigned
US 178 Bus.	4.840	7.789	US 25 / US 25 Bus. / US 178 / US 221 in Greenwood	US 25 / US 25 Bus. / US 178 / SC 72 in Greenwood	1949	current	
US 178 Conn.	0.190	0.306	US 178 / SC 39 / SC 121 in Saluda	US 378 / SC 194 in Saluda	—	—	Unsigned
US 178 Bus.	4.400	7.081	US 21 / US 178 in Wilkinson Heights	US 178 in Orangeburg	1970	current	
US 221 Truck	5.440	8.755	US 221 / SC 127	US 76 / US 221 in Laurens	—	—	
US 221 Alt.	5.360	8.626	US 221 / SC 11 in Chesnee	US 221 Alt. at the North Carolina state line near State Line	1941	current	
US 221 Conn.	0.490	0.789	US 221 / SC 11 east of Chesnee	US 221 east of Chesnee	—	—	Unsigned
US 276 Conn.	1.100	1.770	US 25 Conn. / US 276 in Travelers Rest	US 25 / US 25 Conn. in Travelers Rest	—	—	Unsigned; may be decommissioned
US 276 Bus.	—	—	US 25 / US 276 in Greenville	US 276 in Greenville	c. 1947	1970	
US 276 Bus.	—	—	US 276 in Greenville	US 276 in Mauldin	1983	1984	
US 278 Conn.	0.060	0.097	US 278 / Town Square in Ridgeland	US 278 in Ridgeland	—	—	Unsigned
US 278 Bus.	8.990	14.468	US 278 in Hilton Head Island	US 278 / Greenwood Drive / Pope Avenue in Hilton Head Island	1998	current	
US 301 Conn.	0.410	0.660	I-95 / US 521 in Alcolu	US 301 Conn. in Alcolu	—	—	Unsigned
US 301 Conn.	2.470	3.975	US 301 southeast of Alcolu	US 521 in Alcolu	—	—	Unsigned
US 321 Bus.	4.350	7.001	US 321 / SC 34 / SC 213 southwest of Winnsboro Mills	US 321 near Winnsboro	1952	current	
US 321 Bus.	3.670	5.906	US 321 / SC 9 / SC 72 / SC 97 / SC 121 southeast of Chester	US 321 / SC 97 northwest of Chester	1964	current	
US 321 Bus.	2.500	4.023	US 321 in York	US 321 / SC 161 Bus. in York	1958	current	
US 378 Bus.	6.6	10.6	US 76 / US 378 northwest of Sumter	US 378 east of Sumter	1958	1975	Was routed along Broad Street, Liberty Street, and Myrtle Beach Boulevard
US 378 Bus.	4.490	7.226	US 378 / SC 341 northwest of Lake City	US 378 near Lake City	1958	current	Routed along Main Street (with SC 341) and Church Street / Myrtle Beach Highway
US 378 Truck	27.328	43.980	US 378 / US 501 / US 701 in Conway	US 378 / US 701 / SC 905 in Conway	—	—	Routed along US 501, SC 544 Conn., US 501 Bus., SC 90, Old Reaves Ferry Road, and SC 905
US 401 Bus.	3.4	5.5	US 401 in Bennettsville	US 401 in Bennettsville	1958	1989	Was routed along Main Street and Tyson Avenue, in concurrency with US 15 Bus. It was replaced by SC 385.
US 501 Bus.	4.600	7.403	US 501 in Red Hill	US 501 / US 701 in Conway	1964	current	
US 501 Bus.	7.210	11.603	US 501 / SC 41 Alt. near Marion	US 501 north of Marion	1964	current	
US 521 Bus.	3.420	5.504	US 521 southeast of Andrews	US 521 / SC 41 in Andrews	—	—	
US 521 Conn.	4.7	7.6	US 521 in Sumter	US 15 in Sumter	—	c. 2008	
US 521 Truck	3.420	5.504	US 1 Truck / US 521 in Camden	US 521 / US 601 / US 601 Truck in Camden	—	—	
US 521 Truck	0.830	1.336	US 1 Truck / US 521 / SC 34 Truck in Camden	US 1 / US 1 Truck / SC 34 / SC 34 Truck in Camden	—	—	Completely concurrent with US 1 Truck and SC 34 Truck
US 521 Bus.	1.500	2.414	US 521 / US 601 / US 601 Bus. in Kershaw	US 521 north of Kershaw	—	—	
US 521 Truck	0.140	0.225	US 521 / US 601 / SC 157 Truck / SC 341 Truck in Kershaw	US 521 / US 601 / US 601 Bus. / SC 157 Truck / SC 341 Truck in Kershaw	—	—	Completely concurrent with US 601 / SC 157 Truck / SC 341 Truck
US 521 Conn.	0.060	0.097	US 521 Bus. north of Kershaw	US 521 north of Kershaw	—	—	Unsigned
US 521 Bus.	3.870	6.228	US 521 northwest of Elgin	US 521 / SC 9 in Lancaster	1965	current	
US 521 Byp.	—	—	US 521 northwest of Elgin	US 521 / SC 9 in Lancaster	—	—	
US 601 Truck	5.2	8.4	US 301 / US 601 / SC 4 in Orangeburg	US 21 / US 21 Bus. / US 178 / US 601 in Orangeburg	—	—	
US 601 Truck	3.980	6.405	US 1 / US 521 Truck / US 601 in Camden	US 521 / US 521 Truck / US 601 in Camden	—	—	
US 601 Bus.	0.760	1.223	US 521 / US 521 Bus. / US 601 in Kershaw	US 521 Bus. / US 521 Truck / US 601 / SC 157 Truck / SC 341 Truck in Kershaw	—	—	
US 701 Bus.	4.2	6.8	US 17 / US 17 Bus. / US 701 northwest of Mount Pleasant	US 17 / US 17 Bus. / US 701 northeast of Mount Pleasant	c. 1967	1992	Was routed along Coleman Boulevard and Georgetown Highway (Chuck Dawley Boulevard) in concurrency with US 17 Bus. It was replaced by SC 703 and I-526 Bus.
US 701 Truck	27.328	43.980	US 378 / US 501 / US 701 in Conway	US 378 / US 701 / SC 905 in Conway	—	—	Routed along US 501, SC 544 Conn., US 501 Bus., SC 90, Old Reaves Ferry Road, and SC 905
US 701 Truck	1.468	2.363	US 501 / US 501 Bus. / US 701 in Conway	US 701 / Sherwood Drive in Conway	—	—	Routed along US 501 and Mill Pond Road
US 701 Bus.	0.179	0.288	US 701 north of Loris	US 701 Bus. at the North Carolina state line north of Loris	1960	current	Only business loop that crosses the North Carolina state line
Former
