= Shiloh, Sumter County, South Carolina =

Shiloh
- CDP
- Location within the state of South Carolina
- Coordinates: 33°56′49″N 80°00′18″W
- Country: United States
- State: South Carolina
- County: Sumter

Area
  - Total: 9.78 sq mi (25.34 km^{2})
  - Land: 9.76 sq mi (25.28 km^{2})
  - Water: 0.023 sq mi (0.06 km^{2})
- Elevation: 135 ft (41 m)

Population (2020)
  - Total: 168
  - Density: 17.2/sq mi (6.65/km^{2})
- Time zone: UTC-5 (Eastern (EST))
  - Summer (DST): UTC-4 (EDT)
- FIPS code: 45-65950
- GNIS feature ID: 2402850

Shiloh is a census-designated place (CDP) in Sumter County, South Carolina, United States. The population was 259 at the 2000 census. It is included in the Sumter, South Carolina Metropolitan Statistical Area.

== Geography ==
According to the United States Census Bureau, the CDP has a total area of 9.7 square miles (25.2 km^{2}), of which 9.7 square miles (25.2 km^{2}) is land and 0.04 square mile (0.1 km^{2}) (0.21%) is water.

== Demographics ==
Historical population
Census	Pop.	Note	%±
2000	259		—
2010	214		−17.4%
2020	168		−21.5%
U.S. Decennial Census

=== 2020 census ===
Shiloh CDP, Sumter County, South Carolina – Racial and ethnic composition Note: the US Census treats Hispanic/Latino as an ethnic category. This table excludes Latinos from the racial categories and assigns them to a separate category. Hispanics/Latinos may be of any race.
Race / Ethnicity (NH = Non-Hispanic)	Pop 2000	Pop 2010	Pop 2020	% 2000	% 2010	% 2020
White alone (NH)	99	88	79	38.22%	41.12%	47.02%
Black or African American alone (NH)	151	115	80	58.30%	53.74%	47.62%
Native American or Alaska Native alone (NH)	0	0	0	0.00%	0.00%	0.00%
Asian alone (NH)	0	0	0	0.00%	0.00%	0.00%
Native Hawaiian or Pacific Islander alone (NH)	0	0	0	0.00%	0.00%	0.00%
Other race alone (NH)	0	0	0	0.00%	0.00%	0.00%
Mixed race or Multiracial (NH)	0	0	4	0.00%	0.00%	2.38%
Hispanic or Latino (any race)	9	11	5	3.47%	5.14%	2.98%
Total	259	214	168	100.00%	100.00%	100.00%

=== 2000 census ===
As of the census of 2000, there were 259 people, 84 households, and 66 families residing in the CDP. The population density was 26.6 inhabitants per square mile (10.3/km^{2}). There were 94 housing units at an average density of 9.7/sq mi (3.7/km^{2}). The racial makeup of the CDP was 38.61% White, 58.30% African American, 3.09% from other races. Hispanic or Latino of any race were 3.47% of the population.

There were 84 households, out of which 25.0% had children under the age of 18 living with them, 52.4% were married couples living together, 21.4% had a female householder with no husband present, and 21.4% were non-families. 17.9% of all households were made up of individuals, and 8.3% had someone living alone who was 65 years of age or older. The average household size was 3.08 and the average family size was 3.47.

In the CDP, the population was spread out, with 26.6% under the age of 18, 10.4% from 18 to 24, 23.6% from 25 to 44, 22.8% from 45 to 64, and 16.6% who were 65 years of age or older. The median age was 37 years. For every 100 females, there were 87.7 males. For every 100 females age 18 and over, there were 90.0 males.

The median income for a household in the CDP was $26,042, and the median income for a family was $27,321. Males had a median income of $39,205 versus $16,250 for females. The per capita income for the CDP was $15,568. About 9.7% of families and 14.2% of the population were below the poverty line, including 44.0% of those under the age of 18 and none of those ages 65 or older.

== Education ==
It is in the Sumter County Consolidated School District.
