= Wilkinson Heights, South Carolina =

Wilkinson Heights
- CDP
- Location within South Carolina
- Coordinates: 33°29′50″N 80°49′32″W
- Country: United States
- State: South Carolina
- County: Orangeburg

Area
  - Total: 2.99 sq mi (7.74 km^{2})
  - Land: 2.99 sq mi (7.74 km^{2})
  - Water: 0 sq mi (0.00 km^{2})
- Elevation: 207 ft (63 m)

Population (2020)
  - Total: 1,946
  - Density: 650.8/sq mi (251.29/km^{2})
- Time zone: UTC-5 (EST)
  - Summer (DST): UTC-4 (EDT)
- ZIP code: 29115
- Area code: 803
- FIPS code: 45-77672
- GNIS feature ID: 2403028

Wilkinson Heights is a census-designated place (CDP) in Orangeburg County, South Carolina, United States. The population was 3,068 at the 2000 census.

== Geography ==
According to the United States Census Bureau, the CDP has a total area of 3.0 square miles (7.8 km^{2}), all land.

== Demographics ==
Historical population
Census	Pop.	Note	%±
2000	3,068		—
2010	2,493		−18.7%
2020	1,946		−21.9%
U.S. Decennial Census

=== 2020 census ===
Wilkinson Heights CDP, South Carolina – Racial and ethnic composition Note: the US Census treats Hispanic/Latino as an ethnic category. This table excludes Latinos from the racial categories and assigns them to a separate category. Hispanics/Latinos may be of any race.
Race / Ethnicity (NH = Non-Hispanic)	Pop 2000	Pop 2010	Pop 2020	% 2000	% 2010	% 2020
White alone (NH)	98	63	20	3.19%	2.53%	1.03%
Black or African American alone (NH)	2,918	2,292	1,817	95.11%	91.94%	93.37%
Native American or Alaska Native alone (NH)	10	3	6	0.33%	0.12%	0.31%
Asian alone (NH)	1	5	8	0.03%	0.20%	0.41%
Native Hawaiian or Pacific Islander alone (NH)	0	0	2	0.00%	0.00%	0.10%
Other race alone (NH)	2	4	4	0.07%	0.16%	0.21%
Mixed race or Multiracial (NH)	5	24	31	0.16%	0.96%	1.59%
Hispanic or Latino (any race)	34	102	58	1.11%	4.09%	2.98%
Total	3,068	2,493	1,946	100.00%	100.00%	100.00%

=== 2000 census ===
As of the census of 2000, there were 3,068 people, 1,169 households, and 783 families residing in the CDP. The population density was 1,022.6 inhabitants per square mile (394.8/km^{2}). There were 1,332 housing units at an average density of 444.0 per square mile (171.4/km^{2}). The racial makeup of the CDP was 95.66% Black or African American, 3.42% White, 0.33% Native American, 0.03% Asian, 0.39% from other races, and 0.16% from two or more races. Hispanic or Latino of any race were 1.11% of the population.

There were 1,169 households, out of which 28.0% had children under the age of 18 living with them, 29.3% were married couples living together, 30.8% had a female householder with no husband present, and 33.0% were non-families. 26.9% of all households were made up of individuals, and 11.0% had someone living alone who was 65 years of age or older. The average household size was 2.62 and the average family size was 3.21.

In the CDP, the population was spread out, with 26.7% under the age of 18, 12.5% from 18 to 24, 24.6% from 25 to 44, 21.4% from 45 to 64, and 14.8% who were 65 years of age or older. The median age was 36 years. For every 100 females, there were 83.8 males. For every 100 females age 18 and over, there were 78.9 males.

The median income for a household in the CDP was $22,065, and the median income for a family was $25,110. Males had a median income of $23,705 versus $20,194 for females. The per capita income for the CDP was $11,360. About 24.4% of families and 28.4% of the population were below the poverty line, including 30.2% of those under age 18 and 21.6% of those age 65 or over.
