= Catarrh, South Carolina =

- Populated Place
- Location within the contiguous United States of America
- Coordinates: 34°33′57″N 80°22′02″W
- Country: United States
- State: South Carolina
- County: Chesterfield
- Elevation: 292 ft (89 m)
- Time zone: UTC−5 (EST)
  - Summer (DST): UTC−4 (EDT)
- Area code: 843
- GNIS feature ID: 1221393

Catarrh, South Carolina, United States is an unincorporated community in western Chesterfield County. Jefferson is 6 miles NNW and McBee is 9.2 miles SE. Catarrh appears on the Angelus, South Carolina Geological Survey Map. Catarrh falls within the Jefferson, South Carolina zip code 29718.
