= Bethune, South Carolina =

- Town
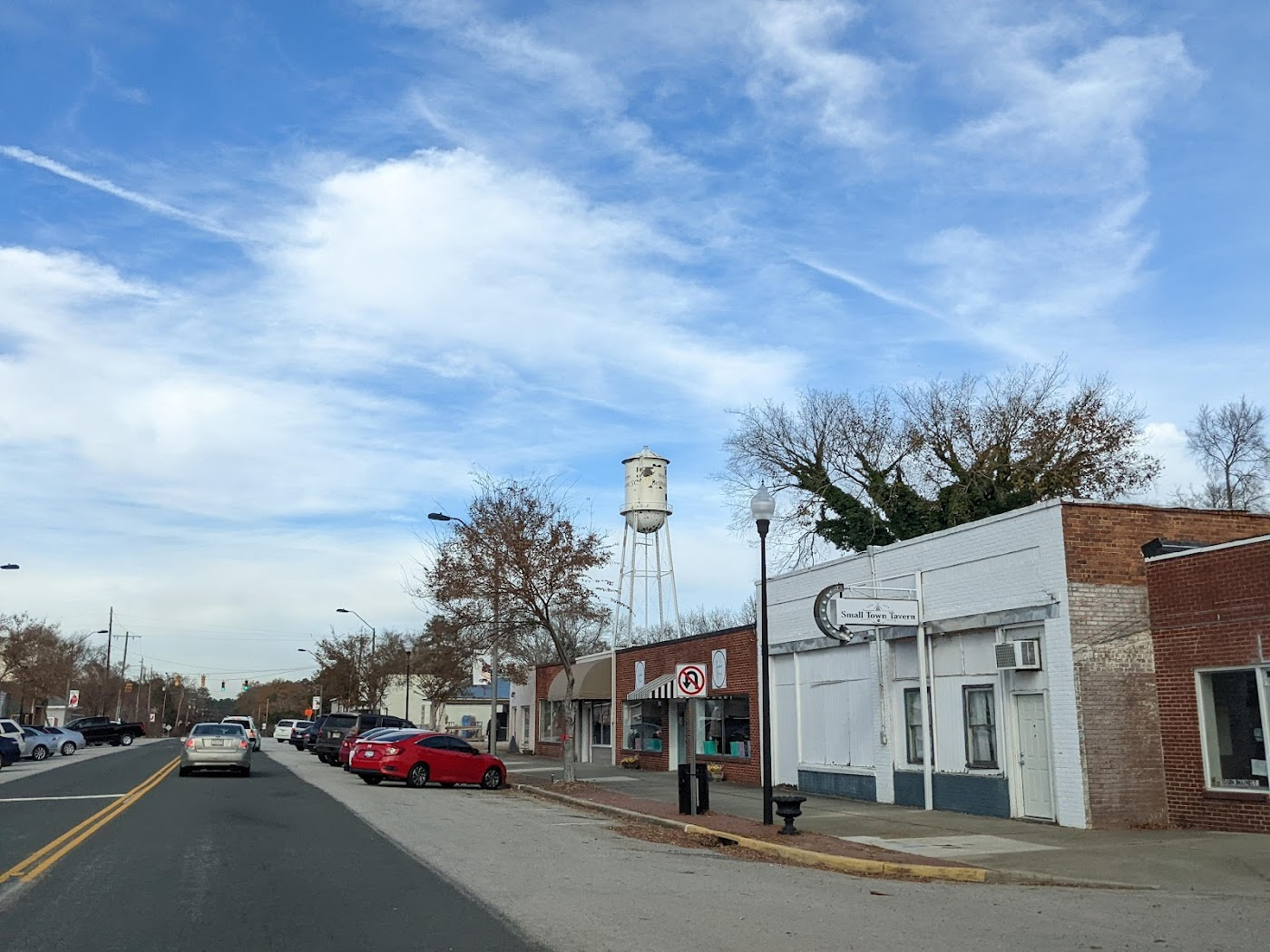
- Downtown Bethune

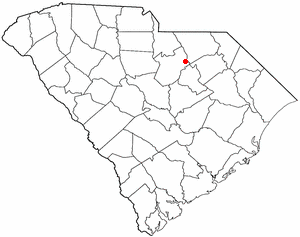
- Location of Bethune, South Carolina
- Coordinates: 34°24′51″N 80°20′55″W
- Country: United States
- State: South Carolina
- County: Kershaw

Area
  - Total: 1.10 sq mi (2.85 km^{2})
  - Land: 1.10 sq mi (2.85 km^{2})
  - Water: 0 sq mi (0.00 km^{2})
- Elevation: 279 ft (85 m)

Population (2020)
  - Total: 315
  - Density: 285.8/sq mi (110.34/km^{2})
- Time zone: UTC-5 (Eastern (EST))
  - Summer (DST): UTC-4 (EDT)
- ZIP code: 29009
- Area codes: 843, 854
- FIPS code: 45-06040
- GNIS feature ID: 2405256
- Website: www.bethunesc.com

Bethune is a small town in Kershaw County, South Carolina, United States. As of the 2020 census, Bethune had a population of 315. It is part of the Columbia, South Carolina Metropolitan Statistical Area.

== History ==
Europeans first moved into the area in the early 1800s, finding members of the Kadapaw tribe living in the area. Originally, the settlers named the town "Lynchwood", and in 1828 they established a post office. After the railroads came to the area, the town was officially chartered in 1900 and the name changed to honor Daniel Murdock Bethune.

== Geography ==
Bethune is located in northeastern Kershaw County 20 miles (32 km) northeast of Camden, the county seat, and 35 miles (56 km) southwest of Cheraw along U.S. Route 1. South Carolina Highway 341 (Main Street) crosses US 1 in the center of town; it leads northwest 17 miles (27 km) to Kershaw and south 16 miles (26 km) to Bishopville.

According to the United States Census Bureau, the town of Bethune has a total area of 1.10 square miles (2.85 km^{2}), all land.

The Lynches River passes east of the town, and its tributary the Little Lynches River passes to the southwest. The rivers and the town are part of the watershed of the Great Pee Dee River.

The MAC-Hunter Astronomical Observatory, a cooperative project of South Carolina amateur astronomers in the Midlands Astronomy Club, is sited south of town.

== Demographics ==
Historical population
| Census | Pop. | Note | %± |
|---|---|---|---|
| 1910 | 317 | | — |
| 1920 | 299 | | −5.7% |
| 1930 | 522 | | 74.6% |
| 1940 | 620 | | 18.8% |
| 1950 | 639 | | 3.1% |
| 1960 | 579 | | −9.4% |
| 1970 | 506 | | −12.6% |
| 1980 | 481 | | −4.9% |
| 1990 | 405 | | −15.8% |
| 2000 | 352 | | −13.1% |
| 2010 | 334 | | −5.1% |
| 2020 | 315 | | −5.7% |
U.S. Decennial Census

As of the census of 2000, there were 352 people, 165 households, and 104 families residing in the town. The population density was 309.4 inhabitants per square mile (119.5/km^{2}). There were 193 housing units at an average density of 169.6 per square mile (65.5/km^{2}). The racial makeup of the town was 89.77% White, 9.66% African American, 0.28% Pacific Islander, 0.28% from other races. Hispanic or Latino of any race were 2.84% of the population.

There were 165 households, out of which 21.8% had children under the age of 18 living with them, 49.7% were married couples living together, 10.9% had a female householder with no husband present, and 36.4% were non-families. 34.5% of all households were made up of individuals, and 21.8% had someone living alone who was 65 years of age or older. The average household size was 2.13 and the average family size was 2.72.

In the town, the population was spread out, with 17.3% under the age of 18, 7.1% from 18 to 24, 22.2% from 25 to 44, 29.8% from 45 to 64, and 23.6% who were 65 years of age or older. The median age was 47 years. For every 100 females, there were 83.3 males. For every 100 females age 18 and over, there were 84.2 males.

The median income for a household in the town was $32,083, and the median income for a family was $40,972. Males had a median income of $37,250 versus $26,406 for females. The per capita income for the town was $18,879. About 5.3% of families and 7.2% of the population were below the poverty line, including 15.5% of those under age 18 and 10.7% of those age 65 or over.

== Education ==
Bethune has a public library, a branch of the Kershaw County Library.

== Arts and culture ==
The Bethune Chicken Strut is an annual festival that takes place every April. The festival includes a parade on Main Street, a classic car show, carnival rides and live musical performances. The festival began in the early 1980s.

The Bethune Christmas Parade is one of many parades that takes place during the Christmas season in Kershaw County.
