= Heath Springs, South Carolina =

- Town
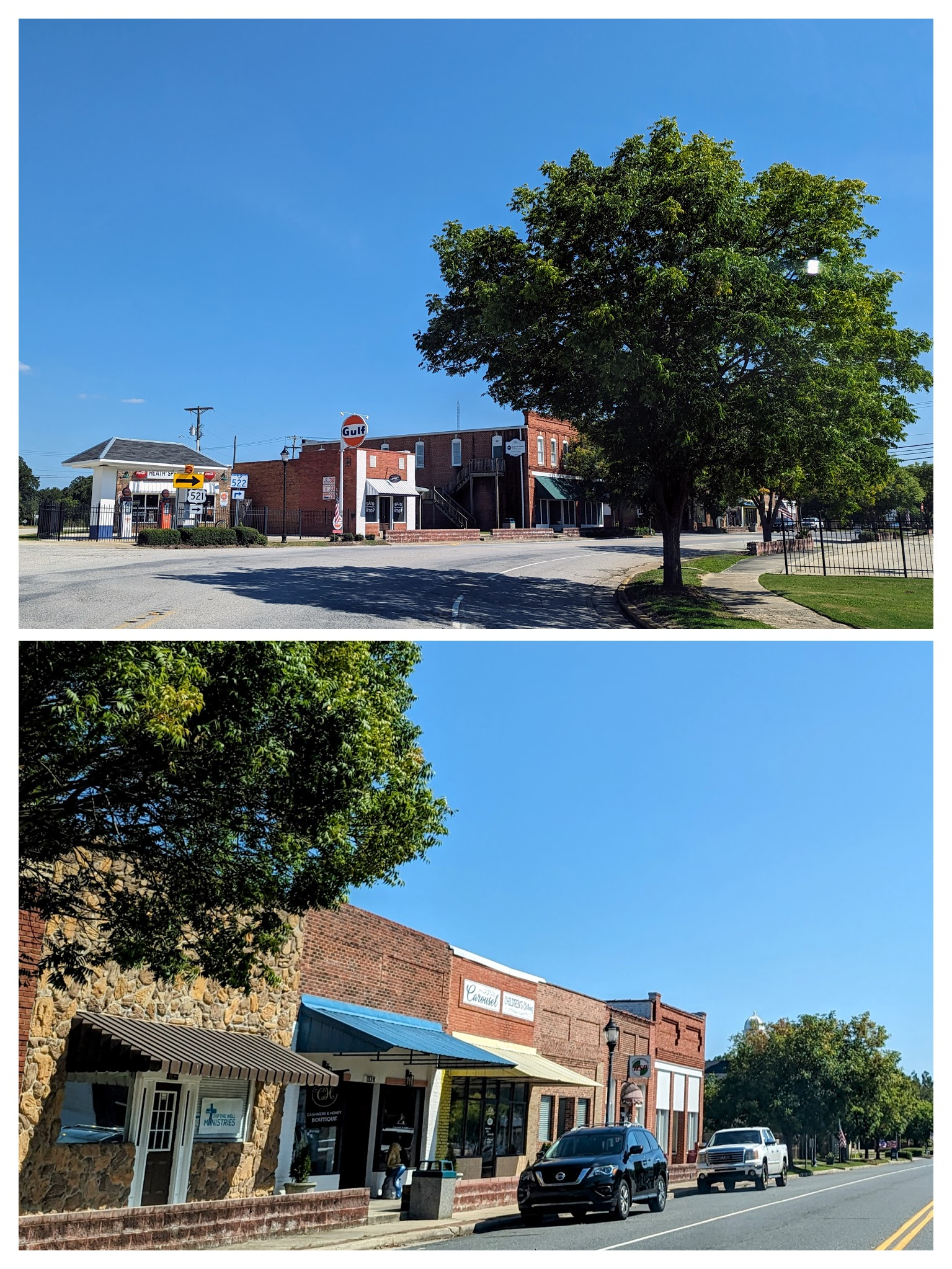
- Views of downtown Heath Springs

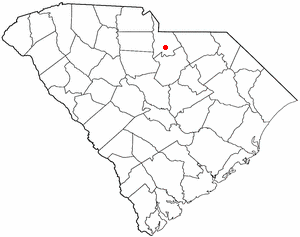
- Location of Heath Springs, South Carolina
- Coordinates: 34°35′36″N 80°40′30″W
- Country: United States
- State: South Carolina
- County: Lancaster

Area
  - Total: 1.63 sq mi (4.21 km^{2})
  - Land: 1.63 sq mi (4.21 km^{2})
  - Water: 0 sq mi (0.00 km^{2})
- Elevation: 686 ft (209 m)

Population (2020)
  - Total: 742
  - Density: 456.6/sq mi (176.29/km^{2})
- Time zone: UTC-5 (Eastern (EST))
  - Summer (DST): UTC-4 (EDT)
- ZIP code: 29058
- Area codes: 803, 839
- FIPS code: 45-32965
- GNIS feature ID: 2405812
- Website: townofheathsprings.org

Heath Springs is a town in Lancaster County, South Carolina, United States. The population was 742 at the 2020 census.

== History ==
Heath Springs was incorporated in 1890. It was named for the firm Heath & Springs.

The Battle of Hanging Rock Historic Site and Heath Springs Depot are listed on the National Register of Historic Places.

== Geography ==
According to the United States Census Bureau, the town has a total area of 1.3 square miles (3.4 km^{2}), all land.

The largest company in Heath Springs is Rico Industries, maker of sports-licensed products such as wallets, flags and grill covers.

== Demographics ==
Historical population
Census	Pop.	Note	%±
1900	266		—
1910	452		69.9%
1920	505		11.7%
1930	520		3.0%
1940	570		9.6%
1950	694		21.8%
1960	832		19.9%
1970	955		14.8%
1980	979		2.5%
1990	907		−7.4%
2000	864		−4.7%
2010	790		−8.6%
2020	742		−6.1%
U.S. Decennial Census 2010 2020

=== Racial and ethnic composition ===
Heath Springs town, South Carolina – Racial and ethnic composition Note: the US Census treats Hispanic/Latino as an ethnic category. This table excludes Latinos from the racial categories and assigns them to a separate category. Hispanics/Latinos may be of any race.
Race / Ethnicity (NH = Non-Hispanic)	Pop 2000	Pop 2010	Pop 2020	% 2000	% 2010	% 2020
White alone (NH)	417	355	369	48.26%	44.94%	49.73%
Black or African American alone (NH)	438	418	331	50.69%	52.91%	44.61%
Native American or Alaska Native alone (NH)	0	1	3	0.00%	0.13%	0.40%
Asian alone (NH)	0	2	1	0.00%	0.25%	0.13%
Native Hawaiian or Pacific Islander alone (NH)	0	1	0	0.00%	0.13%	0.00%
Other race alone (NH)	0	6	5	0.00%	0.76%	0.67%
Mixed race or Multiracial (NH)	1	6	12	0.12%	0.76%	1.62%
Hispanic or Latino (any race)	8	1	21	0.93%	0.13%	2.83%
Total	864	790	742	100.00%	100.00%	100.00%

=== 2000 Census ===
As of the census of 2000, there were 864 people, 328 households, and 225 families residing in the town. The population density was 256.6/km^{2} (667.1/sq mi). There were 366 housing units at an average density of 282.6 per square mile (109.1/km^{2}). The racial makeup of the town was 48.38% White, 51.04% African American, 0.46% from other races, and 0.12% from two or more races. Hispanic or Latino of any race were 0.93% of the population.

There were 328 households, out of which 26.5% had children under the age of 18 living with them, 43.0% were married couples living together, 19.5% had a female householder with no husband present, and 31.1% were non-families. 28.7% of all households were made up of individuals, and 11.3% had someone living alone who was 65 years of age or older. The average household size was 2.50 and the average family size was 3.07.

In the town, the population was spread out, with 22.8% under the age of 18, 9.6% from 18 to 24, 22.2% from 25 to 44, 26.6% from 45 to 64, and 18.8% who were 65 years of age or older. The median age was 42 years. For every 100 females age 18 and under there were 80.4 males. For every 100 females age 18 and over, there were 75.1 males.

The median income for a household in the town was $24,000, and the median income for a family was $29,688. Males had a median income of $26,458 versus $20,463 for females. The per capita income for the town was $10,407. About 24.0% of families and 32.7% of the population were below the poverty line, including 37.8% of those under age 18 and 42.3% of those age 65 or over.
