= South Carolina Highway 210 =

State highway in South Carolina, United States

South Carolina Highway 210

Route information
- Maintained by SCDOT
- Length: 28.580 mi (45.995 km)

Major junctions
- West end: US 21 in Branchville
- US 178 in Bowman; I-26 near Bowman; US 176 in Providence; US 15 near Providence
- East end: SC 6 in Vance

Location
- Country: United States
- State: South Carolina
- Counties: Orangeburg

Highway system
- South Carolina State Highway System; Interstate; US; State; Scenic
← SC 207	→ SC 211

South Carolina Highway 210 (SC 210) is a 28.580-mile-long (45.995 km) state highway in the U.S. state of South Carolina. The highway connects Branchville, Bowman, and Vance.

== Route description ==
SC 210 begins at an intersection with U.S. Route 21 (US 21; Freedom Road) in Branchville, within Orangeburg County. It travels to the northeast and leaves the city limits. The highway immediately crosses Pen Branch. It continues to the northeast and crosses over Cattle Creek and Sandy Run before entering Bowman. There, it has a very brief concurrency with US 178 (Charleston Highway). The highway crosses over Cow Castle Creek before heading to the east. After an interchange with Interstate 26 (I-26), the highway curves back to the northeast. In Providence, SC 210 intersects US 176 (Old State Road). After crossing over Providence Swamp, the highway intersects US 15 (Bass Drive). It heads to the east again, crossing over I-95. It crosses over Horse Range Swamp and then enters Vance. In town, it crosses a railroad track and intersects SC 310 (Camden Road). In the eastern part of town, it meets its eastern terminus, an intersection with SC 6.

== Major intersections ==
The entire route is in Orangeburg County.

Location	mi	km	Destinations	Notes
Branchville	0.000	0.000	US 21 (Freedom Road) – Smoaks, Orangeburg	Western terminus
Bowman	10.070	16.206	US 178 west (Charleston Highway) to I-26 west – Orangeburg	Western end of US 178 concurrency
Bowman	10.190	16.399	US 178 east (Charleston Highway) to I-95 – Harleyville	Eastern end of US 178 concurrency
	15.750	25.347	I-26 – Columbia, Charleston	I-26 exit 165
Providence	20.040	32.251	US 176 (Old State Road) – Cameron, Holly Hill	
	22.970	36.967	US 15 (Bass Drive) – St. George, Santee	
Vance	28.100	45.223	SC 310 (Camden Road) – Holly Hill	
Vance	28.580	45.995	SC 6 – Eutawville, Santee	Eastern terminus
1.000 mi = 1.609 km; 1.000 km = 0.621 mi: Concurrency terminus
