= U.S. Route 176 =

U.S. Highway in the Carolinas

U.S. Route 176
- US 176 highlighted in red

Route information
- Auxiliary route of US 76
- Maintained by NCDOT and SCDOT
- Length: 237.98 mi (382.99 km)
- Existed: November 11, 1926–present
- Tourist routes: Pacolet River Byway

Major junctions
- West end: US 25 Bus. / NC 225 in Hendersonville, NC
- I-85 near Spartanburg, SC; I-585 / US 221 / SC 9 in Spartanburg, SC; US 29 in Spartanburg, SC; I-26 in Irmo, SC; I-20 in St. Andrews, SC; I-126 / US 21 / US 76 / US 321 in Columbia, SC; US 1 / US 378 in Columbia, SC; I-77 in Cayce, SC; I-95 near Holly Hill, SC; US 15 near Holly Hill, SC
- East end: US 52 in Goose Creek, SC

Location
- Country: United States
- States: North Carolina, South Carolina
- Counties: NC: Henderson, Polk SC: Greenville, Spartanburg, Union, Newberry, Richland, Lexington, Calhoun, Orangeburg, Berkeley

Highway system
- United States Numbered Highway System; List; Special; Divided
← SC 174	SC	→ SC 177
← NC 175	NC	→ NC 177

U.S. Route 176 (US 176) is a spur of US 76 in the U.S. states of North Carolina and South Carolina. The U.S. Highway runs 237.98 miles (382.99 km) from US 25 Business and North Carolina Highway 225 (NC 225) in Hendersonville, North Carolina, east to US 52 in Goose Creek, South Carolina. US 176 serves the transition region between the Blue Ridge Mountains and Foothills of Western North Carolina and the Upstate, Midlands, and Lowcountry regions of South Carolina. The highway passes through and connects Spartanburg, one of two major cities in the Upstate, and Columbia, the South Carolina state capital and central city of the Midlands. US 176 parallels and serves as a secondary highway to Interstate 26 (I-26) except for between Spartanburg and Columbia, where the U.S. Highway deviates from the I-26 corridor to serve Union.

== Route description ==
US 176 spans 19.33 miles (31.11 km) in North Carolina and runs 218.65 miles (351.88 km) in South Carolina. The U.S. Highway is a part of the National Highway System in four locations in South Carolina. US 176 is part of the national system from I-85 Business near Spartanburg to South Carolina Highway 295 (SC 295) near Pacolet, during which the U.S. Highway is concurrent with either I-585 or SC 9. The highway's second stretch of National Highway System is along its concurrency with SC 72 around Whitmire. US 176 is also part of the system along its concurrencies with US 21, US 76, and US 321 on Elmwood Street and Huger Street north of SC 12 in Columbia. The highway's final section in which it is included in the National Highway System is during its concurrency with US 21 and US 321 from I-26 in Cayce to where US 321 splits from US 176 and US 21 south of Cayce.

=== Hendersonville to Spartanburg ===
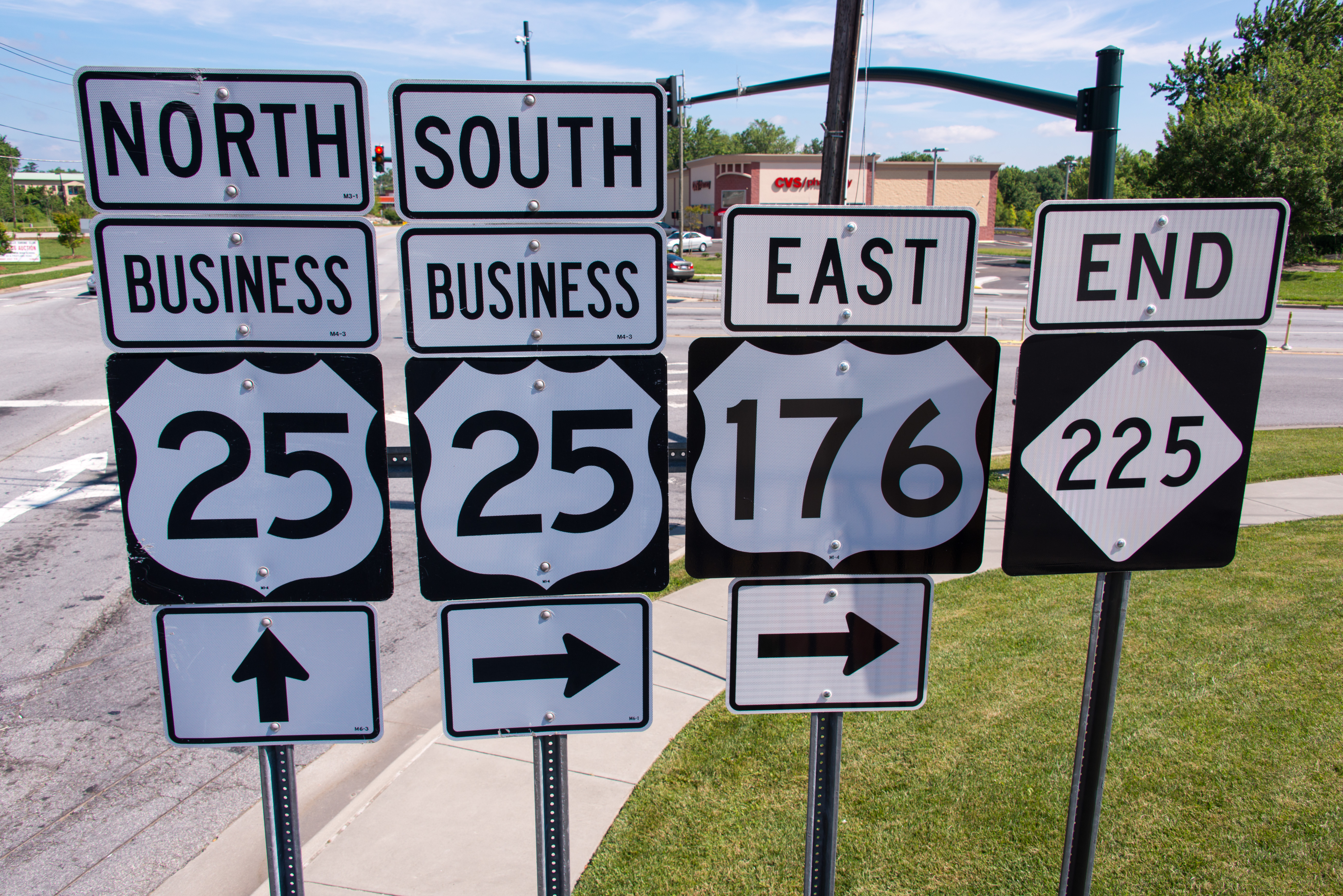
Start of US 176 in Hendersonville

US 176 begins at the southern end of Main Street in the city of Hendersonville. Main Street heads north into the downtown area as US 25 Business; the road also continues south as NC 225 (Greenville Highway). US 176 and US 25 Bus. head east concurrently along Spartanburg Highway, a four-lane highway with a center turn lane that heads through a commercial area and crosses over Norfolk Southern Railway's W Line. The highway leaves Hendersonville and heads southeast through the town of East Flat Rock. US 25 Bus. reaches its southern terminus at US 176's diamond interchange with US 25. US 176 reduces to two lanes and continues along a curvaceous path through the Blue Ridge Mountains, crossing the Green River. The road crosses the Henderson–Polk county line into the city of Saluda. US 176 and the railroad separate temporarily east of Saluda as they descend through the narrow valley of the North Pacolet River, with the railroad descending the inactive Saluda Grade, once the steepest standard gauge Class I railroad grade in the country.

At the opening of the North Pacolet River valley, US 176 follows Trade Street through the town of Tryon, where the highway meets the western end of NC 108 (Lynn Road). Southeast of Tryon, the U.S. Highway enters South Carolina, where it clips the northeastern corner of Greenville County. US 176 continues into Spartanburg County as Asheville Highway. In the town of Landrum, US 176 follows Howard Avenue and intersects SC 14 (Rutherford Street). The highway continues southeast across the South Pacolet River and through Campobello, the site of the highway's junctions with SC 11 (Pine Street) and SC 357 (Holly Springs Road). US 176 passes through the hamlet of Gramling before passing through the town of Inman, where the highway expands to four lanes with intermittent center turn lane and intersects SC 292, which heads north as Main Street and south as Lyman Road.

US 176 expands to a four-lane divided highway just west of its partial cloverleaf interchange with I-26. On the northern edge of the unincorporated community of Southern Shops, the highway has a partial directional interchange with SC 56, which continues straight as Asheville Highway into Spartanburg while US 176 follows Pine Street. There is no access from northbound SC 56 to eastbound US 176. Just east of the SC 56 interchange, US 176 has a diamond interchange with I-85. At Upper Valley Falls Road, the U.S. Highway becomes a freeway between Southern Shops to the south and Valley Falls to the north. US 176 has a diamond interchange with Valley Falls Road and a partial cloverleaf interchange with East Campus Boulevard; both roads provide access to the University of South Carolina Upstate. Just east of East Campus Boulevard is US 176's partial cloverleaf interchange with I-85 Business; there is no access to East Campus Boulevard from the ramp from southbound I-85 Business to westbound US 176.

US 176 continues east concurrent with I-585, with two-way frontage roads on both sides of the freeway. Just east of I-85 Business, there are ramps from eastbound US 176 and to westbound US 176 with the frontage roads. The frontage roads connect with California Avenue, which is accessed from the other direction by a half-diamond interchange after that street's overpass. East of the California Avenue interchange, US 176 has a pair of diamond interchanges with SC 9 and US 221 as the U.S. Highway enters the city of Spartanburg. SC 9 heads north from the three-ramp partial diamond interchange as Boiling Springs Road; the roadway continues south as Church Street as SC 9 joins US 176 in a concurrency. The movement from SC 9 to westbound US 176 is made via California Avenue. The interchange with US 221 (Whitney Road) is a diamond interchange; there, I-585 reaches its southern terminus and US 176 continues as a six-lane divided highway through a commercial area. US 176 and SC 9 pass the campus of Wofford College, including Gibbs Stadium and Benjamin Johnson Arena, and the headquarters of the Southern Conference, of which Wofford is a part, and crosses Norfolk Southern Railway's Charlotte District. Southeast of the railroad, US 176 and SC 9 meet the eastern end of SC 296 (Daniel Morgan Avenue), pass along the west side of Converse College, and intersect US 29 (St. John Street) on the east side of downtown Spartanburg.

=== Spartanburg to Columbia ===
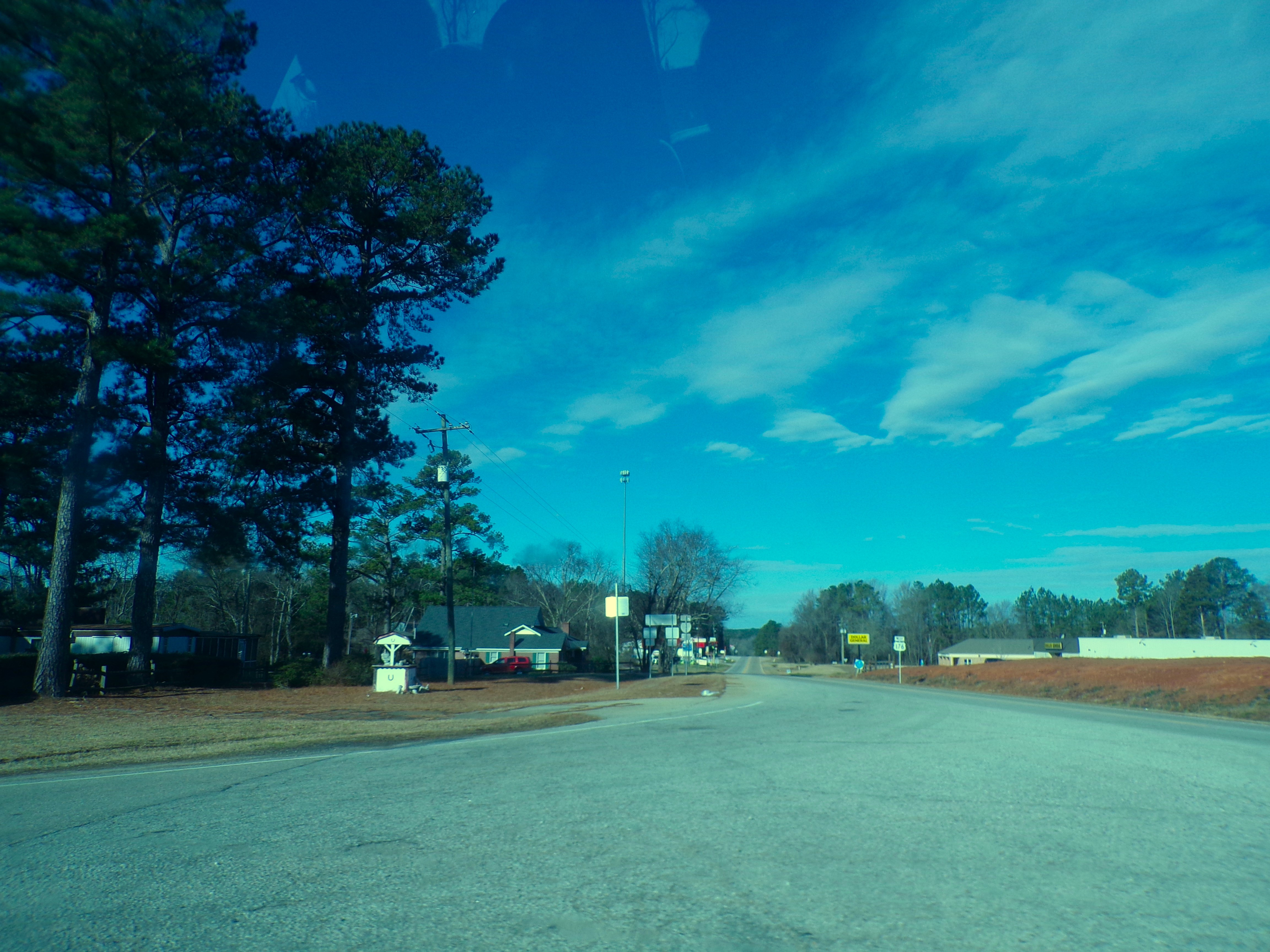
US-176 and SC-202 intersection in Pomaria, SC

US 176 and SC 9 head east out of Spartanburg as a four-lane highway with center turn lane. Just west of the town of Pacolet, the road passes under the W Line, expands to a divided highway, and meets the eastern end of SC 295 (Southport Road). East of SC 295, SC 9 splits east as Pine Street to pass through Pacolet while US 176 bypasses the town to the south. The U.S. Highway intersects SC 150 (Glenn Springs Road) before entering Union County, where the highway's name becomes Furman L. Fendley Highway. US 176 bypasses Jonesville while SC 9 passes directly through; east of the town, SC 9 veers east while SC 18 begins to parallel US 176 southeast to Union. US 176 intersects SC 215 (Buffalo West Springs Highway) and runs concurrently with the state highway on a four-lane road with center turn lane along the west side of town. The highways run concurrently with SC 49 between Rice Avenue, which SC 49 uses to bypass downtown Union, and Main Street. As US 176 and SC 215 curve east, they intersect SC 496 (Industrial Park Road/Union Boulevard), which is signed as SC 49 Truck. The bypass ends on the southern edge of town at the southern terminus of SC 18 (Pinckney Street). SC 215 heads east on Beltline Road while US 176 turns south onto Whitmire Highway.

US 176 continues south as a two-lane road, enters Sumter National Forest, and crosses the Tyger River. At the southern end of Union County, the U.S. Highway meets SC 72 and SC 121 (Carlisle Whitmire Highway) at a directional intersection. The three highways run concurrently on a four-lane undivided highway and cross the Enoree River into Newberry County and the town of Whitmire. There, SC 72 continues to the center of town on Union Street while US 176 and SC 121 follow Watson Street along the edge of town and head south as a two-lane road that crosses Duncan Creek. At Indian Creek, the U.S. Highway and state highway diverge southeasterly and southerly, respectively, shortly before US 176 exits the national forest at its junction with SC 34. US 176 has an oblique junction with SC 219 west of Pomaria, SC 773 within the town, and SC 202 east of the town. The highway meets the western end of SC 213 (Parr Road) west of the town of Peak before entering Richland County.

US 176 gradually edges closer to I-26 before meeting the Interstate at a partial cloverleaf interchange on the edge of the suburban area surrounding Columbia. The highway meets US 76 (Dutch Fork Road) at an oblique intersection and the two U.S. Highways head east together into the town of Irmo. The highways expand to a four-lane road with center turn lane and diverge at their partial cloverleaf interchange with I-26 (James F. Byrnes Expressway), at which US 76 joins the Interstate to head into Columbia. US 176 drops to two lanes and continues southeast into the town of St. Andrews, where the highway has an oblique junction with SC 60 (Lake Murray Boulevard) just west of Harbison State Forest. The highway expands to a four-lane road with center turn lane, passes by the Broad River Correctional Institution, and passes through the downtown area of St. Andrews, then has a diamond interchange with I-20. US 176 enters the city of Columbia, passes the Dutch Square mall, and curves east to cross the Broad River, the Columbia Canal, and Norfolk Southern's W Line on the Broad River Bridge.

US 176 continues on the east side of the river as River Drive. At its junction with Clement Avenue and SC 16 (Sunset Drive), River Drive veers southeast and becomes two lanes. US 176 crosses over a CSX rail line before reaching an oblique intersection with Main Street, where the highway begins a lengthy concurrency with US 21 and US 321. The highways follow four-lane Main Street to the Elmwood Park Historic District, where the highways gain a fourth route, US 76, when they turn west onto six-lane divided Elmwood Avenue at the northern edge of downtown Columbia. One block to the west, the four U.S. Highways meet the western end of SC 48 (Assembly Street). A few blocks further to the west, Elmwood Avenue becomes a freeway carrying I-126 and US 76 west out of downtown Columbia; US 176, US 21, and US 321 exit the freeway at a full Y interchange onto six-lane divided Huger Street. South of another crossing of the W Line, the highways intersect the westbound and eastbound directions of SC 12 at Taylor Street and Hampton Street, respectively. South of their intersection with US 1 and US 378 (Gervais Street), US 176, US 21, and US 321 pass two blocks west of the Columbia Amtrak station before they reach Blossom Street, which carries US 21 Connector and US 76 Connector east through the University of South Carolina campus. The U.S. Highways follow four-lane divided Blossom Street west across the Congaree River out of the city of Columbia into Lexington County.

=== Columbia to Goose Creek ===
US 176, US 21, and US 321 follow Knox Abbott Drive, a four-lane street with center turn lane, west through the city of Cayce, where they intersect SC 2 (State Street) and SC 35 (12th Street). The highways briefly enter the city of West Columbia when they veer southwest onto Charleston Highway. The U.S. Highways pass under a rail line and have an oblique junction with SC 302 (Edmund Road) before re-entering Cayce. US 176, US 21, and US 321 become a divided highway as they pass historic Columbia Speedway, pass over another rail line, and meet the southern end of SC 2 (Frink Street) at a directional intersection that lacks a connection from the south-heading U.S. Highways to northbound SC 2. The U.S. Highways continue south as a four-lane road plus center turn lane that crosses a pair of creeks before expanding to a six-lane divided highway and meeting I-26 at a partial cloverleaf interchange. Just south of that interchange, US 176, US 21, and US 321 meet ramps from the southern terminus of I-77 (Veterans Memorial Freeway) opposite Fish Hatchery Road.

The three U.S. Highways reduce to four lanes and cross over CSX's Columbia Subdivision east of the town of Pine Ridge. US 321 continues south toward Gaston and Swansea while US 176 and US 21 head southeast along Charleston Highway, which drops to two lanes. The two U.S. Highways meet I-26 at a partial cloverleaf interchange and briefly parallel the Interstate as they enter Calhoun County, where the highway is known as Old State Road. The highways diverge at Sandy Run, where US 21 heads south on Columbia Road toward Orangeburg and US 176 continues on Old State Road. West of St. Matthews, the U.S. highway runs concurrently with SC 6 between Caw Caw Road and Bridge Street. US 176 intersects US 601 (St. Matthews Road) and crosses over Norfolk Southern's SC Line south of the county seat of Calhoun County. The highway intersects SC 33 (Cameron Road) in the town of Cameron before leaving Calhoun County.

Shortly after entering Orangeburg County, US 176 intersects US 301 (Five Chop Road) just west of the latter highway's junction with SC 47. The highway intersects SC 210 (Vance Road) at the crossroads of Providence northwest of the U.S. Highway's diamond interchange with I-95. At Wells, US 176 has a five-way intersection with US 15 (Bass Drive) and SC 45 (Branchdale Highway). The highway meets the eastern end of SC 314 (Bunch Ford Road) west of the town of Holly Hill and SC 310 (Camden Road) just inside the town limits. In the center of town, US 176 has a pair of intersections with SC 453, Eutaw Road and Gardner Boulevard, on either side of a grade crossing of CSX's Charleston Subdivision.

US 176 enters Berkeley County by crossing the Dean Swamp, a tributary of the Four Hole Swamp. The U.S. Highway, which is named State Road, intersects SC 27 (Old Gilliard Road) and SC 311 shortly after entering the highway. US 176 heads southeast through a mixture of swamp and forest with occasional farmland before entering the suburban area around Charleston at its junction with US 17 Alternate (Live Oak Drive) on the edge of the city of Goose Creek. The highway continues as St. James Avenue, a four-lane road with center turn lane. US 176 expands to six lanes shortly before reaching its eastern terminus at an oblique intersection with US 52 (Goose Creek Boulevard). There is no direct access from eastbound US 176 to northbound US 52; that movement is made via Thomason Boulevard a few blocks to the northwest.

== Major intersections ==
State	County	Location	mi	km	Destinations	Notes
North Carolina	Henderson	Hendersonville	0.00	0.00	US 25 Bus. north (Main Street) / NC 225 south (Greenville Highway) – Flat Rock	Western end of US 25 Bus. concurrency; western terminus
North Carolina	Henderson	East Flat Rock	4.75	7.64	US 25 to I-26 – Asheville, Greenville	Eastern end of US 25 Bus. concurrency; southern terminus of US 25 Bus.; US 25 exit 7
North Carolina	Polk	Tryon	17.70	28.49	NC 108 east (Lynn Road) – Columbus	Western terminus of NC 108
			19.33 0.00	31.11 0.00	North Carolina–South Carolina state line	
South Carolina	Greenville	No major junctions				
South Carolina	Spartanburg	Landrum	1.91	3.07	SC 14 (Rutherford Street) – Greer	
South Carolina	Spartanburg	Campobello	6.52	10.49	SC 11 (Pine Street) – Chesnee, Cleveland	
South Carolina	Spartanburg	Campobello	6.90	11.10	SC 357 south (Holly Springs Road) – Greer	Northern terminus of SC 357
South Carolina	Spartanburg	Inman	13.54	21.79	SC 292 (Main Street / Lyman Road) – Lyman	
South Carolina	Spartanburg		16.80	27.04	I-26 – Columbia, Asheville	I-26 exit 15
South Carolina	Spartanburg	Southern Shops	19.72	31.74	SC 56 east (Asheville Highway) – Spartanburg	No access from westbound US 176 to eastbound SC 56; directional interchange
South Carolina	Spartanburg	Southern Shops	20.24	32.57	I-85 – Greenville, Charlotte	I-85 exit 72
South Carolina	Spartanburg	Southern Shops	21.07	33.91	Valley Falls Road	Diamond interchange
South Carolina	Spartanburg	Southern Shops	21.47	34.55	East Campus Boulevard – University of South Carolina Upstate	No access from southbound I-85 Bus. to East Campus Boulevard; partial cloverleaf interchange
South Carolina	Spartanburg	Southern Shops	21.91	35.26	I-85 BL – Greenville, Charlotte	Western end of I-585 concurrency; I-85 Bus. exit 5; partial cloverleaf interchange; northern terminus of I-585
South Carolina	Spartanburg	Spartanburg	23.28	37.47	California Avenue	Diamond interchange; I-585 exit 24
South Carolina	Spartanburg	Spartanburg	23.73	38.19	SC 9 north (Boiling Springs Road) / Whitney Road south / Church Street (US 176 Conn. east) to US 221 – Chesnee, Boiling Springs	Western end of SC 9 concurrency; eastern end of I-585 concurrency; southern terminus of I-585; northern terminus of US 176 Conn.; conjoined diamond interchange; I-585 exits 25A-B; separate exits northbound
South Carolina	Spartanburg	Spartanburg			East Wood Street west (US 176 Conn. west)	No access from US 176 east/SC 9 south to US 176 Conn.; eastern terminus of US 176 Conn. and East Wood Street; provides access to Spartanburg Medical Center
South Carolina	Spartanburg	Spartanburg	25.12	40.43	SC 296 west (Daniel Morgan Avenue) – Reidville	Eastern terminus of SC 296
South Carolina	Spartanburg	Spartanburg	25.54	41.10	US 29 (St. John Street) – Cowpens, Lyman	
South Carolina	Spartanburg	Pacolet	33.80	54.40	SC 295 west (Southport Road) – Spartanburg	Eastern terminus of SC 295
South Carolina	Spartanburg	Pacolet	34.09	54.86	SC 9 south (Pine Street) – Jonesville	Eastern end of SC 9 concurrency
South Carolina	Spartanburg	Pacolet	36.14	58.16	SC 150 (Glenn Springs Road) – Gaffney	
South Carolina	Union	Union			Connector Road east (US 176 Conn. east / SC 18 Truck north) to SC 18 – Gaffney	Western end of SC 18 Truck concurrency; western terminus of US 176 Conn.
South Carolina	Union	Union	49.62	79.86	SC 215 north (Buffalo West Springs Road) – Buffalo	Western end of SC 215 concurrency
South Carolina	Union	Union	50.40	81.11	SC 49 north (Rice Avenue) – Lockhart	Western end of SC 49 concurrency
South Carolina	Union	Union	51.15	82.32	SC 49 south (Main Street) – Laurens	Northern terminus of SC 49
South Carolina	Union	Union	51.43	82.77	SC 49 Truck north (Industrial Park Road / Union Boulevard / SC 496)	Southern terminus of SC 49 Truck
South Carolina	Union	Union	52.76	84.91	SC 18 north (Pinckney Street) / SC 215 south (Beltline Road) / SC 18 Truck ends – Jonesville, Carlisle	Eastern end of SC 18 Truck and SC 215 concurrencies; southern terminus of SC 18 and SC 18 Truck
South Carolina	Union				SC 72 Conn. east to SC 72 east / SC 121 north – Chester	Western terminus of SC 72 Conn.
South Carolina	Union		66.77	107.46	SC 72 east / SC 121 north – Carlisle, Chester	Western end of SC 72 and SC 121 concurrencies
South Carolina	Newberry	Whitmire			Church Street west (US 176 Conn. west) to SC 66 / SC 72 west – Whitmire, Whitmire Community School	Eastern terminus of US 176 Conn.
South Carolina	Newberry	Whitmire	68.30	109.92	SC 72 west (Union Street) – Clinton	Eastern end of SC 72 concurrency; no direct access from northbound US 176 to westbound SC 72 or from eastbound SC 72 to southbound US 176
South Carolina	Newberry		75.63	121.71	SC 121 south – Newberry	Eastern end of SC 121 concurrency
South Carolina	Newberry		81.46	131.10	SC 34 – Newberry, Winnsboro	
South Carolina	Newberry		86.72	139.56	SC 219 west – Newberry	Eastern terminus of SC 219
South Carolina	Newberry	Pomaria	88.60	142.59	SC 773 west – Prosperity	Eastern terminus of SC 773
South Carolina	Newberry		90.16	145.10	SC 202 south – Little Mountain	Northern terminus of SC 202
South Carolina	Newberry		92.40	148.70	SC 213 east (Parr Road) – Peak	Western terminus of SC 213
South Carolina	Richland		103.58	166.70	I-26 (James F. Byrnes Expressway) – Columbia, Spartanburg	I-26 exit 97
South Carolina	Richland	Irmo	105.70	170.11	US 76 west (Dutch Fork Road) – Chapin	Western end of US 76 concurrency
South Carolina	Richland	Irmo	108.67	174.89	I-26 east (James F. Byrnes Expressway) / US 76 – Columbia, Spartanburg	Eastern end of US 76 concurrency; I-26 exit 101
South Carolina	Richland	St. Andrews	110.63	178.04	SC 60 west (Lake Murray Boulevard) – Irmo	Eastern terminus of SC 60
South Carolina	Richland	St. Andrews	115.11	185.25	I-20 – Florence, Augusta	I-20 exit 65
South Carolina	Richland	Columbia	117.85	189.66	SC 16 south (Sunset Drive)	Northern terminus of SC 16
South Carolina	Richland	Columbia	118.86	191.29	US 21 / US 321 north (Main Street) – Blythewood, Winnsboro	Western end of US 21 and US 321 concurrencies
South Carolina	Richland	Columbia	119.12	191.71	US 76 east (Elmwood Avenue) / Main Street south – Sumter	Western end of US 76 concurrency
South Carolina	Richland	Columbia	119.18	191.80	SC 48 east (Assembly Street)	Western terminus of SC 48
South Carolina	Richland	Columbia	119.81	192.82	I-126 / US 76 west – Spartanburg	Eastern end of US 76 concurrency; full Y interchange
South Carolina	Richland	Columbia	120.31	193.62	SC 12 west (Taylor Street) – West Columbia	Westbound lanes of SC 12 on one-way road
South Carolina	Richland	Columbia	120.41	193.78	SC 12 east (Hampton Street) – Forest Acres	Eastbound lanes of SC 12 on one-way road
South Carolina	Richland	Columbia	120.71	194.26	US 1 (Gervais Street) / US 378 – Lexington, Camden, Sumter	
South Carolina	Richland	Columbia	121.35	195.29	SC 48 Truck (Blossom Street east / US 21 Conn. east / US 76 Conn. east) / Huger Street south – University of South Carolina	Western terminus of US 21 Conn. the western segment of US 76 Conn., and SC 48 Truck
South Carolina	Lexington	Cayce	122.34	196.89	SC 2 (State Street) – West Columbia	
South Carolina	Lexington	Cayce	123.19	198.26	SC 35 (12th Street)	
South Carolina	Lexington	West Columbia	124.03	199.61	SC 302 south (Edmund Road) – South Congaree	
South Carolina	Lexington	Cayce	125.65	202.21	SC 2 north (Frink Street)	No direct access from eastbound US 176 to northbound SC 2
South Carolina	Lexington	Cayce	126.70	203.90	I-26 – Charleston, Spartanburg	I-26 exit 115
South Carolina	Lexington	Cayce	127.09	204.53	I-77 north (Veterans Memorial Freeway) / Fish Hatchery Road – Charlotte	I-77 exit 1
South Carolina	Lexington		129.59	208.55	US 321 south – Gaston, Swansea	Eastern end of US 321 concurrency
South Carolina	Lexington		131.41	211.48	I-26 – Columbia, Charleston	I-26 exit 119
South Carolina	Calhoun	Sandy Run	138.34	222.64	US 21 south (Columbia Road) – Orangeburg	Eastern end of US 21 concurrency
South Carolina	Calhoun		150.34	241.95	SC 6 north (Caw Caw Road) – Swansea	Western end of SC 6 concurrency
South Carolina	Calhoun		150.82	242.72	SC 6 south (Bridge Street) – St. Matthews	Eastern end of SC 6 concurrency
South Carolina	Calhoun	St. Matthews	154.53	248.69	US 601 (Harry C. Raysor Drive / St. Matthews Road) – Orangeburg, Camden	
South Carolina	Calhoun	Cameron	161.60	260.07	SC 33 (Cameron Road) – Orangeburg	
South Carolina	Orangeburg		170.40	274.23	US 301 (Five Chop Road) to SC 47 – Orangeburg, Santee, Elloree	
South Carolina	Orangeburg	Providence	177.31	285.35	SC 210 (Vance Road) – Vance, Bowman	
South Carolina	Orangeburg		179.01	288.09	I-95 – Florence, Savannah	I-95 exit 90
South Carolina	Orangeburg	Wells	181.31	291.79	US 15 (Bass Drive) / SC 45 east (Branchdale Highway) – St. George, Santee, Eutawville	Western terminus of SC 45
South Carolina	Orangeburg	Holly Hill	184.93	297.62	SC 314 south (Bunch Ford Road) – St. George	Northern terminus of SC 314
South Carolina	Orangeburg	Holly Hill	185.82	299.05	SC 310 north (Camden Road) – Vance	Southern terminus of SC 310
South Carolina	Orangeburg	Holly Hill	186.63	300.35	SC 453 north (Eutaw Road) – Eutawville	Western end of SC 453 concurrency
South Carolina	Orangeburg	Holly Hill	186.86	300.72	SC 453 south (Gardner Boulevard) – Harleyville	Eastern end of SC 453 concurrency
South Carolina	Berkeley		192.75	310.20	SC 27 south (Old Gilliard Road) – Ridgeville	Northern terminus of SC 27
South Carolina	Berkeley		193.95	312.13	SC 311 east – Cross	Western terminus of SC 311
South Carolina	Berkeley	Goose Creek	212.93	342.68	US 17 Alt. (Live Oak Drive) – Moncks Corner, Summerville	
South Carolina	Berkeley	Goose Creek	218.65	351.88	US 52 (Goose Creek Boulevard) / Red Bank Road east – Moncks Corner, North Charleston	No direct access from eastbound US 176 to northbound US 52; eastern terminus; roadway continues as Red Bank Road.
1.000 mi = 1.609 km; 1.000 km = 0.621 mi: Concurrency terminus; Incomplete access

== Special routes ==
=== Spartanburg alternate route ===
U.S. Highway 176 Alternate
- Location: Spartanburg, South Carolina
- Length: 3.8 mi (6.1 km)
- Existed: 1938–1948

U.S. Route 176 Alternate (US 176 Alt.) was an alternate route in Spartanburg. It was established around 1938 after mainline US 176 was rerouted onto Asheville Highway and Church Street; the alternate route continued along the old route via Magnolia, Howard, and Main Streets. In 1948, it was downgraded to secondary road S-42-2. Some map inserts of the time list it as "US 176 Optional" (US 176 Opt.).

=== Spartanburg connector route 1 ===
U.S. Highway 176 Connector
- Location: Spartanburg, South Carolina
- Length: 0.520 mi (837 m)

U.S. Route 176 Connector (US 176 Conn.) is a 0.520-mile (0.837 km) connector route that connects US 221 (North Church Street) in the northern part of Spartanburg with I-585/US 176/SC 9 (North Pine Street) just north of the city. It is known as North Church Street and is an unsigned highway.

=== Spartanburg connector route 2 ===
U.S. Highway 176 Connector
- Location: Spartanburg, South Carolina
- Length: 0.360 mi (579 m)

U.S. Route 176 Connector (US 176 Conn.) is a 0.360-mile (0.579 km) connector route that connects US 221 (North Church Street) with I-585/US 176/SC 9 (North Pine Street) in the northern part of Spartanburg. It travels just north of Spartanburg Medical Center. It is known as East Wood Street and is an unsigned highway.

=== Union business loop ===
U.S. Highway 176 Business
- Location: Union, South Carolina
- Length: 3.1 mi (5.0 km)
- Existed: 1956–1990

U.S. Route 176 Business (US 176 Bus) was a business loop through downtown Union, via Thompson Boulevard and Pinckney Street. It was established around 1956, when the Duncan Bypass was completed and mainline US 176 was realigned along it. Around 1990, US 176 Bus was decommissioned and replaced by an extension of SC 18.

=== Union connector ===
U.S. Highway 176 Connector
- Location: Union, South Carolina
- Length: 0.460 mi (740 m)
- Existed: 1990–present

U.S. Route 176 Connector (US 176 Conn.) is a 0.460-mile (0.740 km) connector route in Union. It connects US 176 (North Duncan Avenue) and South Carolina Highway 18 (SC 18; Thompson Road), along Connector Road. Its entire length is part of SC 18 Truck.

It officially appears on county and state maps, while highway signage identifies it as "TO" US 176. It was created when US 176 was rerouted onto new alignment north of Union, with the elimination of US 176 Business and extension of SC 18; Connector Road was originally part of Duncan Bypass, built around 1956.

=== Whitmire connector route ===
U.S. Highway 176 Connector
- Location: Whitmire, South Carolina
- Length: 0.340 mi (547 m)

U.S. Route 176 Connector (US 176 Conn.) is a 0.340-mile (0.547 km) connector route in the eastern part of Whitmire. It connects South Carolina Highway 72 (SC 72; Church Street / Union Street) and US 176 (Watson Street). It shares the Church Street name with SC 72 and is an unsigned highway.
