= South Carolina Highway 45 =

State highway in South Carolina

South Carolina Highway 45

Route information
- Maintained by SCDOT
- Length: 76.060 mi (122.407 km)
- Existed: 1922–present

Major junctions
- South end: US 17 in McClellanville
- US 17 Alt. in Jamestown; US 52 in St. Stephen
- North end: US 15 / US 176 in Wells

Location
- Country: United States
- State: South Carolina
- Counties: Charleston, Berkeley, Orangeburg

Highway system
- South Carolina State Highway System; Interstate; US; State; Scenic
| ← SC 41 | → SC 46 |

South Carolina Highway 45 (SC 45) is a 76.060-mile (122.407 km) primary state highway in the U.S. state of South Carolina. It serves as the main thoroughfare in northern Berkeley County.

== History ==
Established as an original state highway in 1922, it traversed from SC 41 in St. Stephen to SC 31 in St. Matthews. Around 1926, SC 45 was truncated 4 miles (6.4 km) west of St. Stephen along a new alignment of SC 41 (current U.S. Route 52 or US 52). By 1931, SC 45 was extended west on new primary routing to SC 24 in Pelion. In 1937 or 1938, SC 45 was extended along US 52 east to St. Stephen, then east on new primary routing to SC 179 (current US 17 Alternate or US 17 Alt.) near Jamestown; this was SC 45's longest routing at over 105 miles (169 km).

In 1939, SC 45 was rerouted onto new primary routing west of Eutawville to its current northern terminus with US 15/SC 31 in Wells. The section of road from Eutawville west to Swansea became part of SC 6; Swansea to Pelion became SC 69.

In 1942, both Santee Reservoir (Lake Marion) and Pinopolis Reservoir (Lake Moultrie) begin to be filled causing SC 45 to be altered. SC 45 was rerouted southeast along SC 6 to Cross then north around Lake Moultrie to meet back with the original SC 45 east of Eadytown; the old alignment became secondary roads Fredcon Road (S-38-137) and Edgewater Road (S-8-31) with the rest under Lake Marion. In 1948, SC 45 was truncated west again of St. Stephen onto US 52; however a year later it was extended back to SC 179, near Jamestown. In 1950, SC 45 was rerouted west of Cross onto new primary routing and bridge over the Diversion Canal; the old alignment that hugged Lake Moultrie's shoreline became secondary road Ranger Drive (S-8-132). Around 1952, SC 45 was taken off a 4-mile (6.4 km) concurrency with US 52 and given a new routing between Pineville and St. Stephen; this left behind Colonel Manham Drive (S-8-6). Also, SC 45 was extended east to Jamestown, in concurrency with US 17 Alt., then continue southeast, replacing SC 173, to its current southern terminus with US 17/US 701, in McClellanville. In the late 1990s, a one-block concurrency was eliminated in St. Stephen.

== Major intersections ==
| County | Location | mi | km | Destinations | Notes |
|---|---|---|---|---|---|
| Charleston | McClellanville | 0.000 | 0.000 | US 17 / South Pinckney Street south – Georgetown, Charleston | Southern terminus; South Pinckney Street continues past terminus. |
| Berkeley | Jamestown | 20.699 | 33.312 | US 17 Alt. north / SC 41 – Georgetown, Charleston | Southern end of US 17 Alt. concurrency |
| Berkeley | | 24.390 | 39.252 | US 17 Alt. south – Moncks Corner | Northern end of SC 17 Alt. concurrency |
| Berkeley | St. Stephen | 38.030 | 61.203 | US 52 (Byrnes Drive) – Kingstree, Moncks Corner | |
| Berkeley | | 56.380 | 90.735 | SC 6 east – Moncks Corner | Southern end of SC 6 concurrency |
| Orangeburg | Eutawville | 67.370 | 108.422 | SC 6 west – Santee | Northern end of SC 6 concurrency |
| Orangeburg | Eutawville | 68.060 | 109.532 | SC 453 south / SC 453 Truck begins (Eutaw Road) – Holly Hill | Southern end of SC 453 Truck concurrency; northern terminus of SC 453 and SC 453 Truck |
| Orangeburg | | 72.460 | 116.613 | SC 310 / SC 453 Truck south (Camden Road) – Vance, Holly Hill | Northern end of SC 453 Truck concurrency; roundabout |
| Orangeburg | Wells | 76.060 | 122.407 | US 15 (Bass Drive) / US 176 (Old State Road) – Santee, Camden, St. George, Holly Hill | Northern terminus; to Santee State Park |
1.000 mi = 1.609 km; 1.000 km = 0.621 mi: Concurrency terminus
