= U.S. Route 15 in South Carolina =

Segment of American highway

U.S. Highway 15
- Route of US 15 in South Carolina highlighted in red

Route information
- Maintained by SCDOT
- Length: 158.832 mi (255.615 km)
- Existed: 1935–present

Major junctions
- South end: US 17 Alt. in Walterboro
- US 78 in St. George; US 178 in Rosinville; I-26 near Rosinville; US 176 near Holly Hill; I-95 / US 301 from Santee to Summerton; US 76 / US 378 / US 521 in Sumter; I-20 in Bishopville; US 401 / US 52 in Society Hill; SC 9 in Bennettsville
- North end: US 15 at the North Carolina state line in McColl

Location
- Country: United States
- State: South Carolina
- Counties: Colleton, Dorchester, Orangeburg, Clarendon, Sumter, Lee, Darlington, Marlboro

Highway system
- United States Numbered Highway System; List; Special; Divided; South Carolina State Highway System; Interstate; US; State; Scenic
← SC 14	→ SC 16

U.S. Highway 15 (US 15) is a 158.832-mile (255.615 km) United States Numbered Highway in the eastern part of the U.S. state of South Carolina. It is a north–south highway that travels from Walterboro to the North Carolina state line, north-northeast of McColl.

== Route description ==
Starting at US 17 Alternate (US 17 Alt.) in Walterboro US 15 runs north as North Jefferies Boulevard, which was previously designated as US 17 Alt. until that route turned east onto Wichman Street. It runs parallel to Interstate 95 (I-95) intersecting with US 78 in St. George and later one of its auxiliary routes US 178 before it crosses I-26 at a cloverleaf interchange (exit 172) in Harleyville. Then it turns northwest, passing through Wells where it not only intersects US 176, but the western terminus of South Carolina Highway 45. North of that point it crosses I-95 at exit 93. Just before the town of Santee US 15 converges with US 301. As the routes turn east, the roadway continues north as US 15 Connector to service Santee. In Santee, the two highways merge with I-95 at exit 98 and all three cross Lake Marion. At exit 102, US 15/US 301 split off from I-95 returning to the former segment of US 15/US 301, now named St. Paul Road and go into the town of Summerton. US 15 then separates from US 301, remaining on Church Street (while US 301 makes a right turn onto Main Street) and heads mainly north to city of Sumter. From there, it continues north, crosses I-20, and goes through the cities of Bishopville and Hartsville to the town of Society Hill. It is here that US 401 joins US 15 and both go to the North Carolina border.

== History ==
US 15 was extended south into South Carolina in 1935 as a replacement for the second incarnation of US 401 that existed between 1932 and 1934, which also existed in North Carolina. Besides being replaced by US 15, part of that route was also replaced by the former US 15 Alt. between Sumter and Society Hill.

In 1946 the road ran along a new two-lane bridge over Lake Marion along with US 301 with the potential for a second span that was never built. For a brief period from 1950 to 1951, US 15 was extended south from Walterboro through Yemassee and into Pocotaligo along what is today part of US 17 Alt.

When I-95 was built across Lake Marion in 1968, US 15 and US 301 ran parallel to it until they were relocated in a triple concurrency in 1987.

=== South Carolina Highway 42 ===
South Carolina Highway 42
- Location: Sumter–Bishopville
- Existed: 1922–c. 1926

South Carolina Highway 42 (SC 42) was an original state highway that was established in 1922 from Sumter to Bishopville. In 1925 or 1926, it was decommissioned and redesignated as SC 30. Today, most of its path is part of US 15.

== Major intersections ==
County	Location	mi	km	Destinations	Notes
Colleton	Walterboro	0.000	0.000	US 17 Alt. (North Jefferies Boulevard / Wichman Street) to I-95 – Savannah, Summerville, Charleston, Colleton Museum, Artisans Center	Southern terminus
Colleton	Walterboro	0.170	0.274	SC 64 Bus. east (Paul Street) – Jacksonboro	Southern end of SC 64 Bus. concurrency
Colleton	Walterboro	0.570	0.917	SC 64 Bus. west to I-95 – Ehrhardt	Northern end of SC 64 Bus. concurrency
Colleton	Walterboro	1.200	1.931	SC 64 to I-95	Provides access to Colleton Medical Center and Lowcountry Regional Airport
Colleton	Canadys	11.160	17.960	SC 61 – Summerville, Branchville	
Dorchester	St. George	20.820	33.507	US 78 – Dorchester, Branchville	
Dorchester	Rosinville	26.650	42.889	US 178 – Bowman, Harleyville	
Dorchester		29.148– 29.150	46.909– 46.912	I-26 – Orangeburg, Summerville	I-26 exits 172 A-B
Orangeburg		32.650	52.545	Bunch Ford Road east (SC 314 east)	Western terminus of SC 314 and Bunch Ford Road
Orangeburg	Wells	36.620	58.934	US 176 / SC 45 east – Cameron, Eutawville	Western terminus of SC 45
Orangeburg		39.690	63.875	I-95 – Savannah, Florence	I-95 exit 93
Orangeburg		43.620	70.200	US 301 south / Bass Drive north (US 15 Conn. north) – Orangeburg, Santee, Santee State Park	Southern end of US 301 concurrency; southern terminus of US 15 Conn.; SCHP Patrolman Harry B. Ray Memorial Intersection
Orangeburg		44.608– 44.668	71.790– 71.886	I-95 south / Five Chop Road (SC 6 Conn. east) – Savannah	Southern end of I-95 concurrency; western terminus of SC 6 Conn. and Five Chop Road; I-95 exit 97
US 15 overlaps with I-95 (exits 97–102)
Clarendon	Adams Landing	50.312	80.969	I-95 north – Florence	Northern end of I-95 concurrency; I-95 exit 102
Clarendon	Summerton	57.712	92.878	US 301 north – Manning	Northern end of US 301 concurrency
Clarendon	Summerton	57.772	92.975	Railroad Avenue	Northern terminus of US 15 Conn.; western terminus of Railroad Avenue
Clarendon	Paxville	67.122	108.022	SC 261 – Pinewood, Manning	
Sumter	South Sumter–Sumter line	77.552	124.808	US 15 Conn. north	No access from US 15 to US 15 Conn. or from US 15 Conn. to US 15 north
Sumter	South Sumter–Sumter line	77.822	125.242	US 521 south (South Guignard Parkway) – Manning, Camden, Central Carolina Technical College, University of South Carolina Sumter	
Sumter	Sumter	80.582	129.684	US 76 Bus. – Camden	
Sumter	Sumter	80.842	130.103	US 401 north – Lamar, Darlington	Southern terminus of US 401
Sumter	Sumter	82.412	132.629	US 76 / US 378 – Columbia, Lynchburg, Turbeville	
Lee	Manville	96.902	155.949	SC 441 south – Woodrow	Northern terminus of SC 441
Lee	Bishopville	100.582	161.871	I-20 – Columbia, Florence	I-20 exit 116
Lee	Bishopville	102.172	164.430	SC 154 – Dorchester	
Lee	Bishopville	103.042	165.830	SC 34 / SC 341 – Camden, Lynchburg	Southern end of SC 34 and SC 341 concurrencies
Lee	Bishopville	104.432	168.067	SC 341 north – Bethune	Northern end of SC 341 concurrency
Darlington	Lydia	114.392	184.096	SC 34 east / SC 403 south – Darlington, Timmonsville	Northern end of SC 34 concurrency; southern end of SC 403 concurrency
Darlington	Hartsville	117.302	188.779	SC 151 – McBee, Darlington	
Darlington	Hartsville	117.972	189.858	US 15 Bus. north – Hartsville	Southern terminus of US 15 Bus.
Darlington	Hartsville	118.942– 118.966	191.419– 191.457	SC 151 Bus. – Hartsville, Darlington	Interchange
Darlington	Hartsville	123.092	198.097	US 15 Bus. south – Hartsville	Northern terminus of US 15 Bus.
Darlington	Society Hill	133.602	215.012	US 52 south / US 401 south – Darlington	Southern end of US 52/US 401 concurrency
Darlington	Society Hill	135.682	218.359	US 52 north – Cheraw	Northern end of US 52 concurrency
Marlboro	Dyers Hill	142.862	229.914	SC 912 north – Wallace	Southern terminus of SC 912
Marlboro	Bennettsville	145.972	234.919	SC 385 (West Main Street) – Bennettsville	Former US 15 Bus.
Marlboro	Bennettsville	147.202	236.899	SC 9 south / SC 38 west – Cheraw	Southern end of SC 9 and SC 38 concurrencies
Marlboro	Bennettsville	148.132	238.395	SC 9 Bus. north / SC 38 Bus. west / SC 38 east – Marion, Myrtle Beach	Northern end of SC 38 concurrency; southern terminus of SC 9 Bus.; eastern terminus of SC 38 Bus.
Marlboro	Bennettsville	149.172	240.069	SC 9 south – North Myrtle Beach, Dillon	Northern end of SC 9 concurrency
Marlboro	McColl	157.172	252.944	SC 381 – Clio, Gibson, North Carolina	
Marlboro	McColl	158.832	255.615	US 15 north / US 401 north – Laurinburg	Continuation into North Carolina
1.000 mi = 1.609 km; 1.000 km = 0.621 mi: Concurrency terminus; Incomplete access

== See also ==
- Special routes of U.S. Route 15

U.S. Route 15
Previous state: Terminus	South Carolina	Next state: North Carolina
