= South Carolina Highway 453 =

State highway in South Carolina, United States

South Carolina Highway 453

Route information
- Maintained by SCDOT
- Length: 14.930 mi (24.028 km)

Major junctions
- South end: US 178 in Harleyville
- I-26 near Harleyville; US 176 in Holly Hill
- North end: SC 45 / SC 453 Truck in Eutawville

Location
- Country: United States
- State: South Carolina
- Counties: Dorchester, Orangeburg

Highway system
- South Carolina State Highway System; Interstate; US; State; Scenic
← SC 441	→ SC 460

South Carolina Highway 453 (SC 453) is a 14.930-mile-long (24.028 km) state highway in the U.S. state of South Carolina. The highway connects Harleyville and Eutawville, via Holly Hill.

== Route description ==
SC 453 begins at an intersection with U.S. Route 178 (US 178; West Main Street) in Harleyville, Dorchester County. It travels to the north-northeast and crosses over some railroad tracks just before an interchange with Interstate 26 (I-26). Right after it intersects 7 Mile Road, it parallels some railroad tracks for approximately three miles (4.8 km). Shortly after that stretch, it enters Orangeburg County. Just before entering Bowyer, SC 453 crosses over Home Branch. In the town of Holly Hill, it travels southeast of Gilmore Park. The highway intersects US 176 (Old State Road). The two highways travel concurrently to the northwest for about three blocks. It travels to the northeast and curves to the north-northwest. It curves back to the northeast and passes Holly Hill Academy just before crossing Briner Branch. The highway continues to the northeast, through rural areas and enters Eutawville. Almost as soon as it enters town, it meets its northern terminus, an intersection with SC 45 (Branchville Highway/Eutaw Road).

== Major intersections ==
County	Location	mi	km	Destinations	Notes
Dorchester	Harleyville	0.000	0.000	US 178 (West Main Street) – Rosinville, Summerville, Beidler Forest	Southern terminus
Dorchester		1.260– 1.264	2.028– 2.034	I-26 – Charleston, Columbia	I-26 exit 177
Orangeburg	Boyer	6.740	10.847	Gardner Boulevard (US 176 Truck / SC 453 Truck north)	Southern terminus of SC 453 Truck
Orangeburg	Holly Hill	7.930	12.762	US 176 east (Old State Road) – Charleston	Southern end of US 176 concurrency
Orangeburg	Holly Hill	8.160	13.132	US 176 west (Old State Road) – Cameron	Northern end of US 176 concurrency
Orangeburg	Eutawville	14.930	24.028	SC 45 (Branchville Highway / Eutaw Road / SC 453 Truck south)	Northern terminus of SC 453 and SC 453 Truck
1.000 mi = 1.609 km; 1.000 km = 0.621 mi: Concurrency terminus

== Boyer–Eutawville truck route ==
South Carolina Highway 453 Truck
- Location: Boyer–Eutawville
- Length: 10.670 mi (17.172 km)

South Carolina Highway 453 Truck (SC 453 Truck) is a 10.670-mile (17.172 km) truck route that takes truck traffic around most of Holly Hill. It utilizes approximately half of both U.S. Route 176 Truck (US 176 Truck) and SC 310, plus a short portion of US 176 and a long portion of SC 45.

The entire route is in Orangeburg County.

Location	mi	km	Destinations	Notes
Boyer	0.000	0.000	US 176 Truck east / SC 453 – Cement plants, Lumber plants	Southern end of US 176 Truck concurrency; southern terminus
	2.180	3.508	US 176 west – Cameron	Northern end of US 176 Truck concurrency; southern end of US 176 concurrency; western terminus of US 176 Truck
Holly Hill	2.250	3.621	US 176 east (Old State Road) / SC 310 begins – Holly Hill	Northern end of US 176 concurrency; southern end of SC 310 concurrency; southern terminus of SC 310
	6.270	10.091	SC 45 west (Branchdale Highway) / SC 310 north (Camden Road) – Orangeburg, Vance, Santee	Northern end of SC 310 concurrency; southern end of SC 45 concurrency; roundabout
Eutawville	10.670	17.172	SC 45 east / SC 453 south – Eutawville	Northern end of SC 45 concurrency; northern terminus of SC 453 and SC 453 Truck
1.000 mi = 1.609 km; 1.000 km = 0.621 mi: Concurrency terminus
