= Interstate 95 in South Carolina =

Highway in South Carolina

Interstate 95
- Blue Star Memorial Highway; Purple Heart Memorial Freeway
- I-95 highlighted in red

Route information
- Maintained by SCDOT
- Length: 198.76 mi (319.87 km)
- Existed: 1968–present
- History: Completed in 1978
- NHS: Entire route

Major junctions
- South end: I-95 at the Georgia state line near Hardeeville
- US 17 (various locations in the state); US 278 near Hardeeville; US 21 near Yemassee; US 78 in St. George; I-26 near Bowman; US 176 near Providence; US 15 / US 301 from Santee to Summerton; US 76 in Florence; I-20 / I-20 BS in Florence; US 52 near Florence
- North end: I-95 at the North Carolina state line near Rowland, NC

Location
- Country: United States
- State: South Carolina
- Counties: Jasper, Hampton, Colleton, Dorchester, Orangeburg, Clarendon, Sumter, Florence, Darlington, Marlboro, Dillon

Highway system
- Interstate Highway System; Main; Auxiliary; Suffixed; Business; Future; South Carolina State Highway System; Interstate; US; State; Scenic
← SC 93	→ SC 97

Interstate 95 (I-95) is a major Interstate Highway, running along the East Coast of the United States from Florida to Maine. In South Carolina, I-95 runs approximately parallel to the Atlantic Ocean shore although about 50 miles (80 km) inland, from Hardeeville in the south to Dillon in the northeast. The route runs through the cities of Florence and Walterboro.

== Route description ==
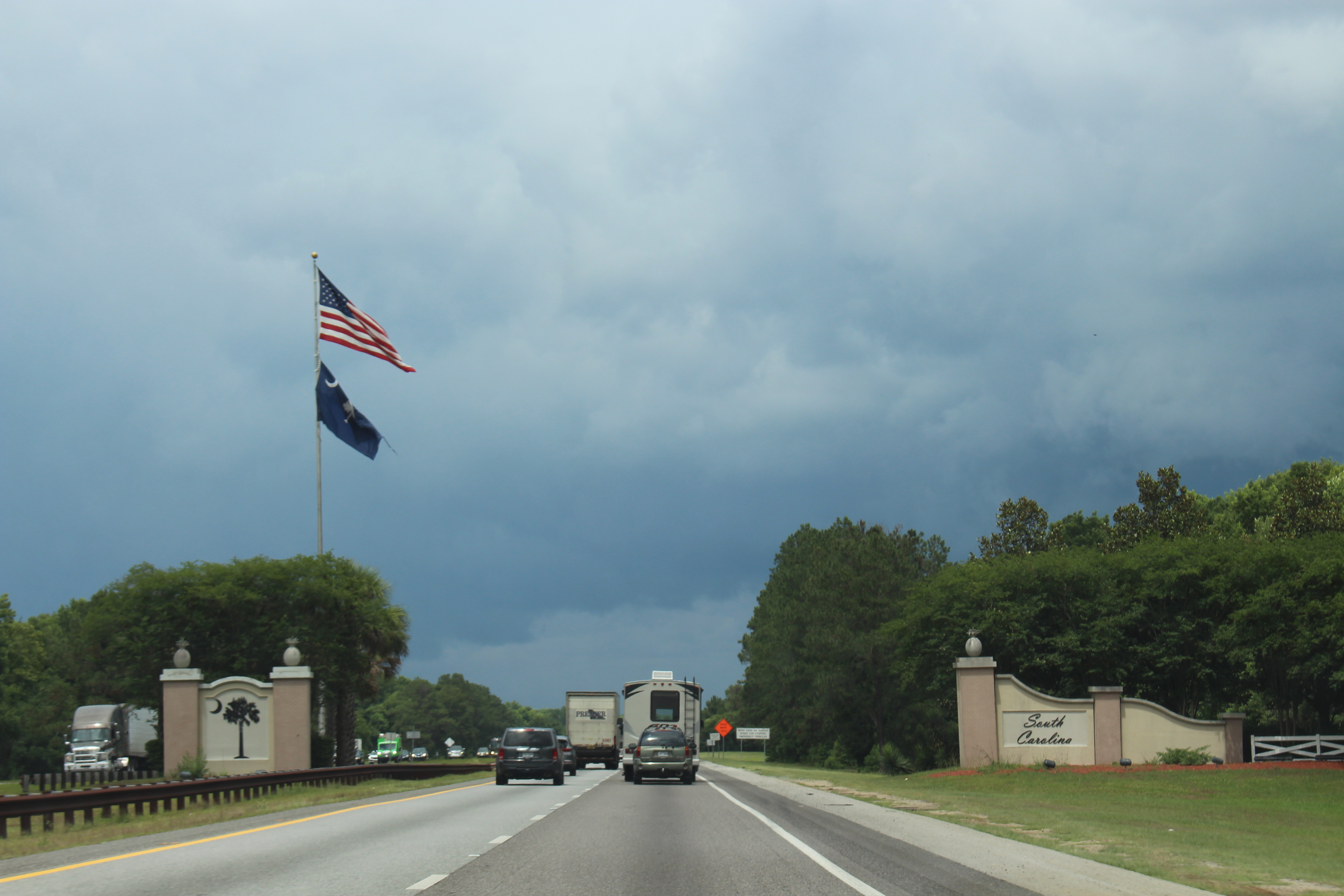
The southern gateway to I-95 in South Carolina

For the most part, the 199-mile (320 km) drive is fairly benign, passing through the pine forests, farmlands, and blackwater streams and swamps of the Atlantic Plain. As the route travels north, it moves inland from coastal cities such as Hardeeville and inland to cities such as Darlington. However, a few landmarks do exist to break up the monotony. Crossing from the south from Georgia just over the Savannah River bridge, motorists are greeted to an elaborate gateway of sabal palmettos into the state of South Carolina. The Juanita M. White Crosswalk also exists between exits 18 and 21. A flyover on twin high-spans over Lake Marion provides an unexpected scenic break in the center of the highway's length. The old US 15/US 301 bridge runs along the west side of I-95 and is used for recreational purposes. Moving further north and out of the Palmetto State, the North Carolina state line is prominently marked by the South of the Border amusement complex at the US 301/US 501 exit. Local traffic parallel to the Interstate uses a combination of US 17 and US 17 Alternate (US 17 Alt.) from the Georgia state line north of Savannah to Walterboro, US 15 from Walterboro to Santee, and US 301 from Santee to South of the Border. In addition, I-95 shares a number of concurrencies, or multiplexes, with three of these US Highways at various stretches in South Carolina.

=== Services ===
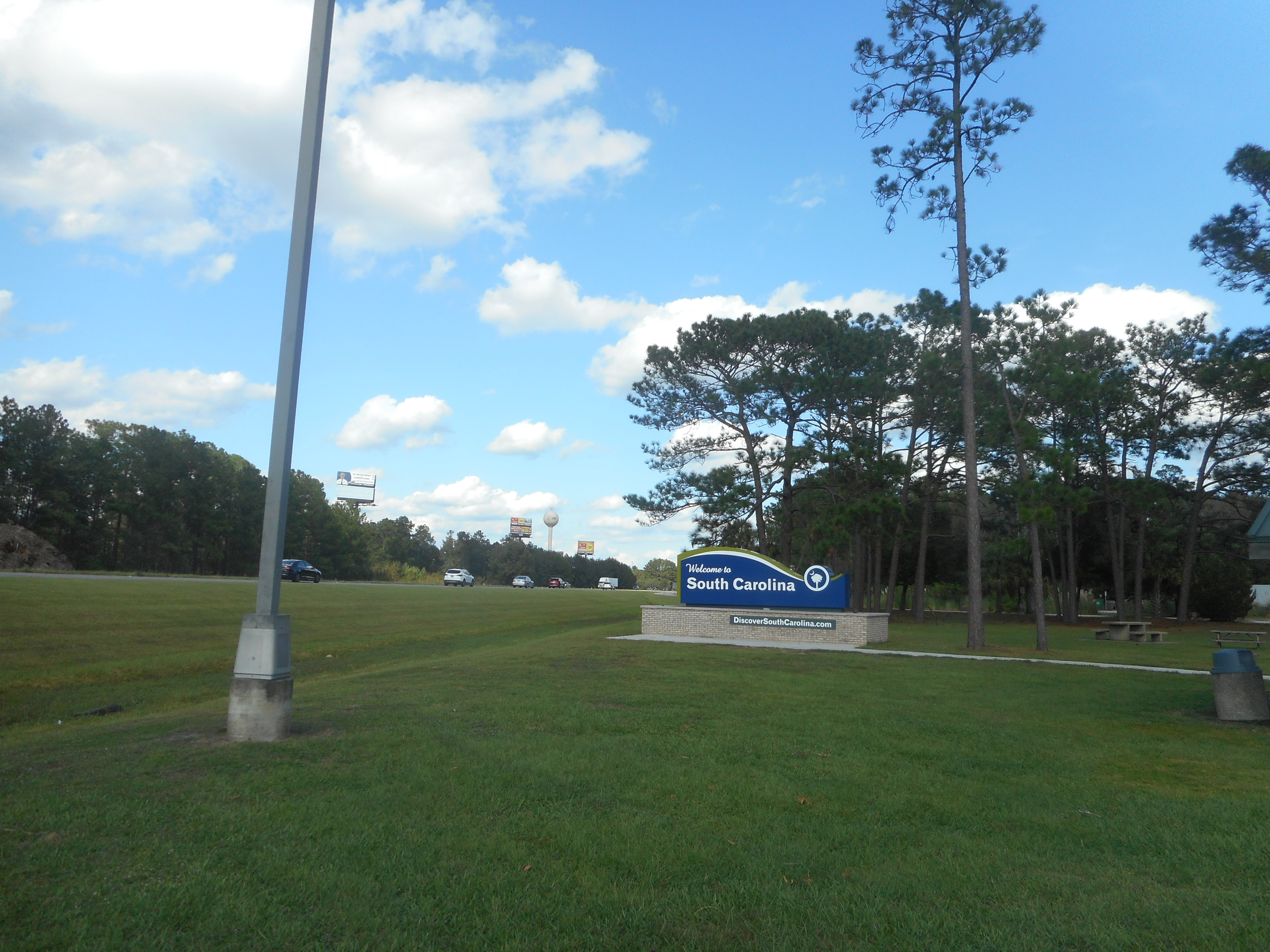
A welcome sign at the Jasper County welcome center

The South Carolina Department of Transportation (SCDOT) operates and maintains three welcome centers and five rest areas along I-95. Welcome centers, which have a travel information facility on site, are located at milemarkers 4 (northbound), 99 (southbound), and 195 (southbound); rest areas are located at milemarkers 47 (north and southbound), 99 (northbound), and 139 (north and southbound). Common at all locations are public restrooms, public telephones, vending machines, picnic areas, and barbecue grills.

The South Carolina Department of Public Safety (SCDPS) and South Carolina State Transport Police (STP) operate and maintain one truck inspection/weigh station, located northbound at milemarker 74. The location utilizes weigh-in-motion that does not require commercial motor vehicles to leave the freeway to be weighed. An inspection shed and pit are also on site, where full-service inspections are performed for flagged and randomly picked trucks.

Several parking area locations are also found along I-95; these were either formally rest areas or weigh stations that were converted. The parking areas offer no amenities and some are even restricted for commercial motor vehicles only.

=== Dedicated and memorial names ===
I-95 in South Carolina feature numerous dedicated or memorialized bridges, interchanges, and stretches of freeway.

- Blue Star Memorial Highway – Official South Carolina honorary name of I-95 throughout the state. Markers are located at both welcome centers.
- Jacob Ham Jr. Highway – Is a dedicated two-mile (3.2 km) portion of I-95 located in Darlington County, north of Florence. Dedicated in October, 2013, it is in honor of Lance Corporal Jacob Ham Jr., who served as a trooper with the South Carolina Highway Patrol for 12 years until his death in 1998.
- Mark H. Coates Highway – Is a dedicated one-mile (1.6 km) portion of I-95 located in Jasper County near Hardeeville and extends one-half mile (0.80 km) on both sides of milemarker 7. In May 1997, the South Carolina General Assembly passed a resolution to designate this section of I-95 in honor of Lance Corporal Mark Hunter Coates, who served as a trooper with the South Carolina Highway Patrol from 1987 until his death in 1992. Coates, who was a native of Lexington County, was fatally shot near milemarker 7 on November 20, 1992, during a traffic stop.

== History ==
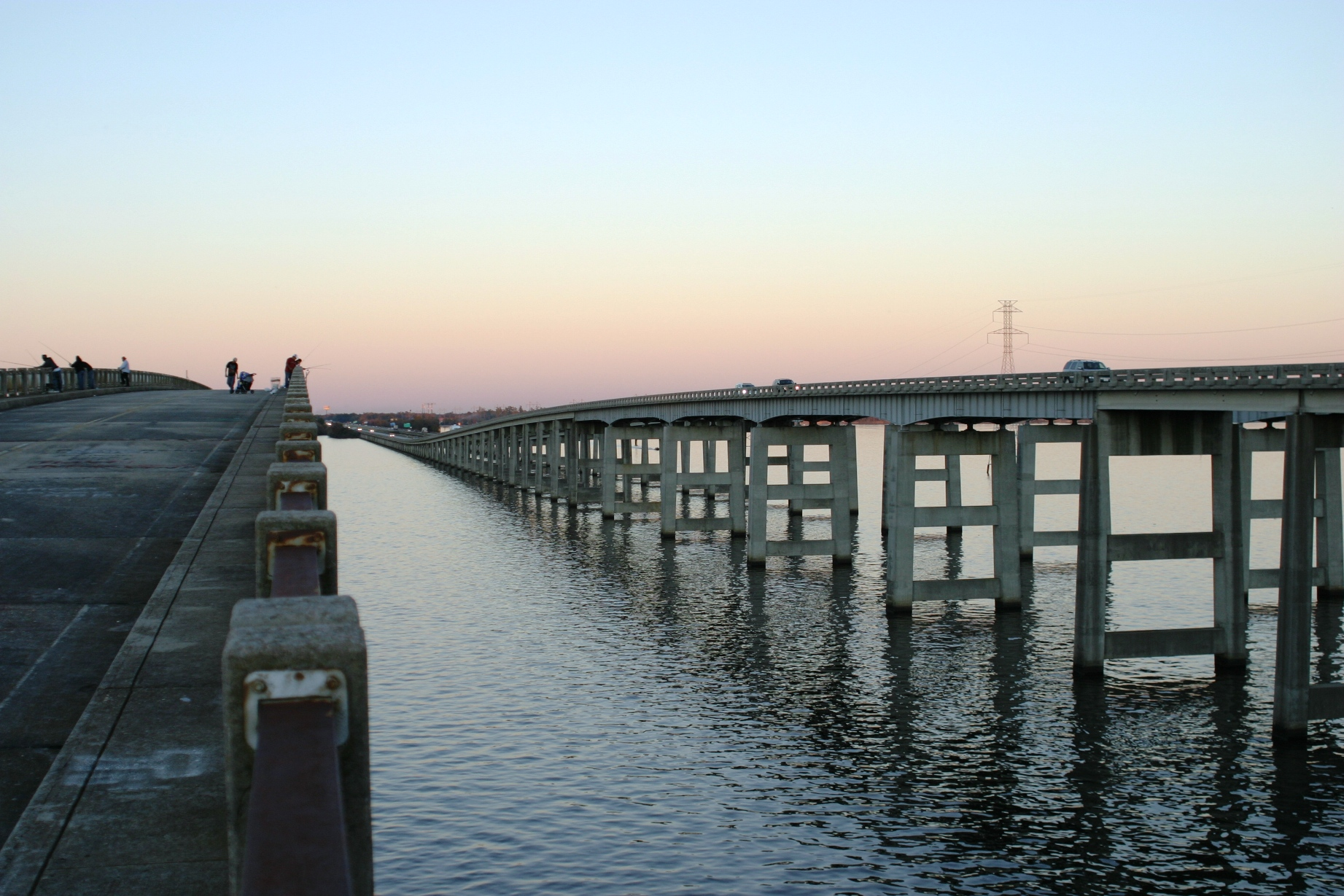
I-95 bridge-causeway over Lake Marion at Santee; the old (bypassed road) bridge-causeway was used as fishing pier until 2019.

I-95 first appeared on state maps between 1962 and 1964, with construction from US 17 north of Hardeeville to Ridgeland. By 1967, more sections were under construction, including Pocotaligo to Walterboro and Santee to the North Carolina state line. The first section to officially open happened in 1968, from South Carolina Highway 527 (SC 527), near Gable, to SC 9/SC 57, in Dillon.

In 1971–1972, more sections of I-95 was completed: going north from SC 9/SC 57, in Dillon, to the North Carolina state line and going south from SC 527, near Gable, along the recently completed 1968-built Lake Marion bridge, to the US 301 connector, in Santee (exit 97). Also part of US 17 between Ridgeland (exit 22) to near Yemassee (exit 33) was combined with I-95, with temporary status through Coosawhatchie; I-95 then continued on new freeway north to SC 63, in Walterboro.

By 1975, I-95 was open continuously from US 17, in Hardeeville, to SC 63, in Walterboro; temporary exits were removed around Coosawhatchie. In 1976, the two sections of I-95 were connected, from SC 63, in Walterboro, to the US 301 connector, in Santee (exit 97). In the same year, exit numbers were added along I-95. The last section of I-95 was completed in 1978, connecting US 17, in Hardeeville, south to the Georgia state line.

In 1987, US 15 and US 301 were relocated from a parallel bridge across Lake Marion, into a triple concurrency with I-95 between exits 97 and 102.

In 1990, exit 21 was added, for what was then US 278, but redesignated as SC 336 in 1997. Between 1998 and 2000, exit 153, Honda Way, was added. In 2003, I-95 was widened to six lanes from just south of I-20 to north of SC 327, around Florence.

In the 2010s, local leaders in Hardeeville had requested for a new exit, at milemarker 3, for the RiverPort Business Park, while, in Walterboro, an effort was being made to establish an I-95 business loop that would help steer travelers into the downtown area from the bypassing freeway. Neither efforts had made further traction since their initial announcements. Also, discussions of possibly converting I-95 into a toll road were brought up but was met with resistance, especially within SCDOT. These tolls have been advocated by legislators in State Districts 36 and 40 in order to fund their counties (Clarendon and Orangeburg), where Lake Marion crosses.

== Exit list ==
County	Location	mi	km	Exit	Destinations	Notes
Savannah River		0.00	0.00		I-95 south (SR 405) – Savannah	Continuation into Georgia
Savannah River		0.00	0.00	Savannah River Bridge		
Jasper	Hardeeville	5.1	8.2	5	US 17 to US 321 – Hardeeville, Estill, Savannah	
Jasper		8.2	13.2	8	US 278 – Beaufort, Hilton Head Island, Bluffton, Parris Island	
Jasper		18.0	29.0	18	Bees Creek Road – Switzerland	former Road 13
Jasper	Ridgeland	20.8	33.5	21	SC 336 – Ridgeland	
Jasper	Ridgeland	22.4	36.0	22	US 17 south – Ridgeland	South end of US 17 overlap
Jasper		28.3	45.5	28	SC 462 – Coosawhatchie	
Jasper	Point South	33.0	53.1	33	US 17 north – Charleston, Beaufort, Port Royal	North end of US 17 overlap
Hampton	Yemassee	38.2	61.5	38	SC 68 – Yemassee, Hampton, Varnville	
Colleton		42.4	68.2	42	US 21 – Yemassee, Orangeburg	
Colleton	Walterboro	53.6	86.3	53	SC 63 to US 17 Alt. – Walterboro	To Tuskegee Airmen Monument
Colleton	Walterboro	57.5	92.5	57	SC 64 – Walterboro, Lodge	
Colleton		62.6	100.7	62	McLeod Road	former Road 34
Colleton		68.4	110.1	68	SC 61 – Canadys, Branchville	
Edisto River		68.8	110.7	Edisto River Bridge		
Dorchester	St. George	76.7	123.4	77	US 78 – St. George, Branchville	
Dorchester		82.3	132.4	82	US 178 – Harleyville, Bowman	
Orangeburg		85.8	138.1	86	I-26 (James F. Byrnes Memorial Freeway) – Charleston, Columbia	Signed as exits 86A (east) and 86B (west); cloverleaf interchange
Orangeburg		90.5	145.6	90	US 176 – Holly Hill, Cameron	
Orangeburg		93.0	149.7	93	US 15 – Holly Hill	
Orangeburg		96.9	155.9	97	US 15 south / US 301 south – Orangeburg	South end of US 15 and US 301 overlap
Orangeburg	Santee	98.3	158.2	98	SC 6 – Eutawville, Santee, Elloree	To Santee State Park
Lake Marion		99.8	160.6	William James Gooding Bridge		
Clarendon		102.0	164.2	102	US 15 north / US 301 north / Road 400 – North Santee	North end of US 15 and US 301 overlap
Clarendon	Summerton	108.2	174.1	108	Buff Blvd – Summerton	former Road 102
Clarendon		114.7	184.6	115	US 301 – Manning, Summerton	
Clarendon		119.0	191.5	119	SC 261 (Paxville Highway) – Manning, Paxville	
Clarendon		122.1	196.5	122	US 521 / Main Street north (US 301 Conn. north) – Sumter, Manning, Alcolu	Southern terminus of US 301 Conn. and Main Street
Clarendon		132.4	213.1	132	SC 527 – Sardinia, Bishopville, Kingstree	
Sumter		135.5	218.1	135	US 378 – Turbeville, Sumter, Lake City	To Myrtle Beach via Conway
Sumter		141.1	227.1	141	SC 53 / SC 58 – Shiloh	To Woods Bay State Natural Area
Sumter		145.9	234.8	146	SC 341 – Lake City, Lynchburg, Olanta	
Florence		149.9	241.2	150	SC 403 – Sardis, Timmonsville	
Florence		153.7	247.4	153	Honda Way – Timmonsville	
Florence	Florence	157.5	253.5	157	US 76 (West Palmetto Street) – Florence, Timmonsville	
Florence	Florence	160.7	258.6	160	I-20 west (J. Strom Thurmond Freeway west) – Columbia I-20 BS east (David McLeod Boulevard east) – Florence	Signed as exits 160A (east) and 160B (west); I-20/I-20 Bus. exits 141A-B; eastern terminus of I-20; western terminus of I-20 Bus.
Florence		164.4	264.6	164	US 52 (Lucas Street) – Florence, Darlington	
High Hill Creek				Florence–Darlington county line		
Florence		169.0	272.0	169	TV Road – Quinby, Florence	
Florence		170.7	274.7	170	SC 327 – Florence, Marion, Myrtle Beach	Marion and Myrtle Beach signed northbound; Florence signed southbound; to Francis Marion University and Florence Airport
Great Pee Dee River		175.2	282.0	Florence–Dillon county line		
Dillon		181.7	292.4	181	SC 38 – Latta, Marion, Bennettsville	Signed as exits 181A (east) and 181B (west); to Myrtle Beach
Dillon					I-73 Toll	Proposed interchange
Dillon		190.5	306.6	190	SC 34 – Dillon	
Dillon	Dillon	193.3	311.1	193	SC 9 / SC 57 – Dillon, Little Rock, Bennettsville	Ben Bernanke exit ramp
South Carolina–North Carolina line		198.8	319.9	1	US 301 / US 501 – Rowland, Laurinburg, Dillon	Interchange extends into North Carolina; signed as exits 1A (south) and 1B (north) southbound; exit number based on North Carolina mileage
South Carolina–North Carolina line		198.8	319.9		I-95 north – Fayetteville	Continuation into North Carolina
1.000 mi = 1.609 km; 1.000 km = 0.621 mi: Concurrency terminus; Unopened

== See also ==
- Edisto River
- Lake Marion
- Pee Dee River
- South of the Border
- South Carolina Highway Patrol

Interstate 95
Previous state: Georgia	South Carolina	Next state: North Carolina
