= South Carolina Highway 6 =

State highway in South Carolina

South Carolina Highway 6

- Route of SC 6 highlighted in red

Route information
- Maintained by SCDOT
- Length: 116.092 mi (186.832 km)
- Existed: 1922–present

Major junctions
- West end: US 76 in Ballentine
- US 1 in Lexington; I-20 near Lexington; US 21 near St. Matthews; I-26 near St. Matthews; US 601 in St. Matthews; I-95 / US 15 / US 301 in Santee
- East end: US 52 in Moncks Corner

Location
- Country: United States
- State: South Carolina
- Counties: Richland, Lexington, Calhoun, Orangeburg, Berkeley

Highway system
- South Carolina State Highway System; Interstate; US; State; Scenic
← SC 5	→ SC 7

South Carolina Highway 6 (SC 6) is a 116.092-mile (186.832 km) primary state highway in the U.S. state of South Carolina. It extends from US 76 in Ballentine to US 52/SC 6 Truck in Moncks Corner. It uniquely links all three of the major hydropower projects in South Carolina: Lake Murray, Lake Marion, and Lake Moultrie.

== Route description ==
The highway runs generally southeast from the central part of South Carolina to near the Atlantic Ocean and is listed as a hurricane evacuation route.

Beginning at a junction with U.S. Highway 52 in Moncks Corner, the route runs northwest along the shoreline of Lake Moultrie as West Main Street. It then turns right onto Ranger Drive. It turns left onto "Old Number Six Highway" where is later starts a concurrency with SC 45 as Eutaw Road. The concurrency runs and far from Lake Marion, and passes through Eutawville. There SC 45 departs to the west and SC 6 continues along the lake through Vance to Santee, where it intersects Interstate 95. It then adjoins the Santee State Park on its right.

After a concurrency with SC 267 begins, it becomes Main Street through Elloree, South Carolina. The concurrency ends when SC 267 turns off to the right onto Lonestar Road. SC 6 then traverses St. Matthews as Bridge Street before having a brief concurrency with U.S. Highway 176. Route 26 turns left onto Caw Caw Highway and has an interchange with Interstate 26. The route turns right and head northwest in a concurrency with U.S. Route 21 and then separates from U.S. 21 onto Center Hill Road. It turns right on St. Matthews Road in a northwesterly direction, passing through Swansea as 2nd Street intersecting U.S. Route 321 in town and joining a concurrency with SC 302 as Edmund Hwy. The concurrency ends when SC 6 turns to the left onto S. Lake Drive where it heads northwest to Red Bank. In Red Bank, it intersects with Interstate 20.

The route then passes through Lexington where it briefly separates into a one-way street pair. It crosses U.S. Route 1 and has a brief concurrency with U.S. Route 378. SC 6 passes just east of Lake Murray (over the Saluda Dam as a divided highway). In Irmo, SC 6 changes from N. Lake Drive to Dreher Shoals Road before ending at a junction with U.S. Highway 76 in Ballentine. The last section of the route runs south and west of Columbia, the state capital. Counties traversed by the route include Berkeley, Orangeburg, Calhoun, Lexington, and Richland.

== Major intersections ==
County	Location	mi	km	Destinations	Notes
Richland	Ballentine	0.000	0.000	US 76 (Dutch Fork Road) – Chapin, Columbia	Western terminus
Lexington		4.460	7.178	SC 6 Conn. east	Western terminus of SC 6 Conn.
Lexington		4.520	7.274	SC 60 east (Lake Murray Boulevard) / Bush River Road east – Irmo	Western terminus of SC 60 and Bush River Road
Lexington		4.650	7.483	SC 6 Conn. west	Eastern terminus of SC 6 Conn.
Lexington	Lexington	9.730	15.659	US 378 east (Sunset Boulevard) – Columbia	Western end of US 378 concurrency
Lexington	Lexington	10.020	16.126	US 378 west (Columbia Avenue) – Saluda	Eastern end of US 378 concurrency
Lexington	Lexington	10.360	16.673	US 1 Conn. begins	Western end of US 1 Conn. concurrency; northern terminus of US 1 Conn., which only travels on the eastbound lanes of SC 6
Lexington	Lexington	10.640	17.123	US 1 (Main Street) – Batesburg-Leesville	Eastern end of US 1 Conn. concurrency; southern terminus of US 1 Conn., which only travels on the eastbound lanes of SC 6
Lexington	Lexington	12.308– 12.310	19.808– 19.811	I-20 – North Augusta, Columbia	Partial cloverleaf interchange; I-20 Exit 55
Lexington	Red Bank	16.050	25.830	SC 602 east (Platt Springs Road) – South Congaree, Springdale	Western terminus of SC 602
Lexington	Edmund	19.660	31.640	SC 302 north (Edmund Highway) – South Congaree	Western end of SC 302 concurrency
Lexington		21.260	34.215	SC 302 south (Edmund Highway) – Pelion	Eastern end of SC 302 concurrency
Lexington	Swansea	31.230	50.260	US 321 south (North Church Street) to SC 3 – North	Western end of US 321 concurrency
Lexington	Swansea	31.290	50.356	US 321 north (North Church Street) – Columbia	Eastern end of US 321 concurrency
Calhoun		42.260	68.011	US 21 north (Columbia Road) – Sandy Run	Western end of US 21 concurrency
Calhoun		43.830	70.538	US 21 south (Columbia Road) – Orangeburg	Eastern end of US 21 concurrency
Calhoun		45.200– 45.270	72.742– 72.855	I-26 – Columbia, Orangeburg	Partial cloverleaf interchange; I-26 Exit 136
Calhoun		48.611	78.232	US 176 west (Old State Road) – Sandy Run	Western end of US 176 concurrency
Calhoun		49.369	79.452	US 176 east (Old State Road) – Cameron	Eastern end of US 176 concurrency
Calhoun	St. Matthews	52.652	84.735	US 601 (Harry C. Raysor Drive) – Orangeburg, Eastover	
Calhoun	Creston	61.352	98.736	SC 33 (Cameron Road) – Cameron, Lone Star	
Orangeburg		66.842	107.572	SC 267 north (McCords Ferry Road) – Fort Motte	Western end of SC 267 concurrency
Orangeburg	Elloree	68.112	109.616	SC 47 south (Cleveland Street) to US 301 (Five Chop Road) – Orangeburg	Northern terminus of SC 47
Orangeburg		70.112	112.834	SC 267 south (Tee Vee Road) to US 15 south – Wells	Eastern end of SC 267 concurrency
Orangeburg	Santee	74.802	120.382	Bass Drive (US 15 Conn. south) – Orangeburg	Northern terminus of US 15 Conn.
Orangeburg	Santee	75.122	120.897	I-95 / US 15 / US 301 (Purple Heart Memorial Freeway) – St. George, Summerton	Diamond interchange; I-95 exit 98
Orangeburg		76.828	123.643	Five Chop Road west (SC 6 Conn. west) to US 301 south – Orangeburg	Eastern terminus of SC 6 Conn. and Five Chop Road
Orangeburg		78.632	126.546	SC 310 south (Camden Road) – Holly Hill	Northern terminus of SC 310
Orangeburg	Vance	80.032	128.799	SC 210 west (Vance Road) – Bowman	Eastern terminus of SC 210
Orangeburg	Eutawville	85.312	137.296	SC 45 west (Porcher Avenue) – Wells	Western end of SC 45 concurrency
Berkeley		96.302	154.983	SC 45 east (Trojan Road) – Pineville	Eastern end of SC 45 concurrency
Berkeley	Moorefield	103.172	166.039	SC 311 west to US 176 west – Holly Hill	Eastern terminus of SC 311
Berkeley	Moncks Corner	115.082	185.207	US 17 Alt. / SC 6 Truck east (Live Oak Drive) – Summerville, Jamestown	Western terminus of SC 6 Truck
Berkeley	Moncks Corner	116.092	186.832	US 52 / SC 6 Truck west / Main Street Extension east – Goose Creek, St. Stephen	Eastern terminus of SC 6 and SC 6 Truck; western terminus of Main Street Extension
1.000 mi = 1.609 km; 1.000 km = 0.621 mi: Concurrency terminus

== Special routes ==
=== Irmo connector route ===
South Carolina Highway 6 Connector
- Location: Irmo, South Carolina
- Length: 0.090 mi (145 m)

South Carolina Highway 6 Connector (SC 6 Conn.) is a 0.090-mile (0.145 km) connector route that exists southwest of Irmo. It is actually a ramp southwest of the intersection of SC 6, SC 60, and Bush River Road. It is unnamed and is an unsigned highway.

=== Elloree truck route ===
South Carolina Highway 6 Truck
- Location: Elloree, South Carolina
- Length: 0.770 mi (1,239 m)

South Carolina Highway 6 Truck (SC 6 Truck) is a 0.770-mile (1.239 km) truck route of SC 6 that has about half of its path within the city limits of Elloree. It begins at an intersection with SC 47 on Felderville Road (S-38-81). It travels to the southeast. Then, it turns left onto Snider Street (S-38-1023) and travels to the northeast.; at Main Street, it intersects SC 6/SC 267 (Old Number Six Highway). Here, it reaches its eastern terminus. It is entirely concurrency with SC 47 Truck. An Ahold Delhaize distribution center is located in the town, the truck route provides an alternate route to that center.

=== Santee connector route ===
South Carolina Highway 6 Connector
- Location: Santee, South Carolina
- Length: 1.685 mi (2.712 km)

South Carolina Highway 6 Connector (SC 6 Conn.) is a 1.685-mile (2.712 km) connector route that exists southeast of Santee. It is a connector between Interstate 95, U.S. Route 15 (US 15), and US 301 south of the town and SC 6 southeast of it. It is named Five Chop Road and is an unsigned highway.

=== Moncks Corner truck route ===
South Carolina Highway 6 Truck
- Location: Moncks Corner, South Carolina
- Length: 2.270 mi (3.653 km)

South Carolina Highway 6 Truck (SC 6 Truck) is a 2.270-mile (3.653 km) truck route in the central portion of Moncks Corner, which is in the central portion of Berkeley County. The entire length is concurrent with U.S. Route 17 Alternate (US 17 Alt.) and US 52.

The truck route begins at an intersection with the SC 6 mainline (Main Street). At this intersection, it begins concurrent with US 17 Alt. (South Live Oak Drive). The two highways travel to the northeast and curve to the east-northeast. They pass the Berkeley County Courthouse and the Berkeley County Sheriff's Office. An intersection with the northern terminus of Carolina Avenue leads to the historic downtown, city hall, and recreation complex of the city. They travel on a bridge over some railroad tracks of CSX and then pass Berkeley Middle School. After passing the Moncks Corner Medical Center, they intersect US 52. Here, SC 6 Truck turns right and follows US 52 to the south-southwest. The two highways travel along a retail corridor. Then, they intersect the eastern terminus of SC 6 (East Main Street) and the western terminus of Main Street Extension. Here, SC 6 Truck ends, and US 52 continues to the south-southwest.

The entire route is in Moncks Corner, Berkeley County.

mi	km	Destinations	Notes
0.000	0.000	SC 6 (Main Street) – Pinopolis, Cross, Holly Hill, Charleston, St. John's Christian Academy, Business district US 17 Alt. south (South Live Oak Drive) – Summerville	Western end of US 17 Alt. concurrency; western terminus
1.470	2.366	US 17 Alt. north / US 52 west	Eastern end of US 17 Alt. concurrency; western end of US 52 concurrency
2.270	3.653	US 52 east / SC 6 west (East Main Street) / Main Street Extension east – County administrative building, Recreation complex, Historic downtown	Eastern end of US 52 concurrency; eastern terminus of SC 6, SC 6 Truck, and East Main Street; western terminus of Main Street Extension
1.000 mi = 1.609 km; 1.000 km = 0.621 mi: Concurrency terminus
