= South Carolina Highway 310 =

State highway in South Carolina, United States

Route information
- Length: 8.500 mi (13.679 km)

Major junctions
- South end: US 176 in Holly Hill
- SC 45 north of Holly Hill; SC 210 in Vance
- North end: SC 6 northwest of Vance

Location
- Country: United States
- State: South Carolina
- Counties: Orangeburg

Highway system
- South Carolina State Highway System; Interstate; US; State; Scenic
← SC 309	→ SC 311

South Carolina Highway 310 (SC 310) is an 8.500-mile (13.679 km) long state highway in the southeastern part of the U.S. state of South Carolina. The highway travels in a south-north orientation from Holly Hill north to Vance, and then northwest to its northern terminus, completely within Orangeburg County.

== Route description ==
SC 310 begins at an intersection with US 176/SC 453 Truck in Holly Hill. The highway heads north concurrently with SC 453 Truck to a roundabout with SC 45, north of the city. Here, the truck route follows SC 45, while SC 310 continues to the north. It enters the city of Vance, where it intersects SC 210. After leaving Vance, SC 310 heads northwest and meets its northern terminus, an intersection with SC 6, just northwest of the city.

SC 310 is not part of the National Highway System, a system of roadways important to the nation's economy, defense, and mobility.

== Major intersections ==
The entire route is in Orangeburg County.

Location	mi	km	Destinations	Notes
Holly Hill	0.000	0.000	US 176 / SC 453 Truck south (Old State Road) – Goose Creek	Southern end of SC 453 Truck concurrency; southern terminus
	4.020	6.470	SC 45 / SC 453 Truck north (Branchdale Highway) – Eutawville	Northern end of SC 453 Truck concurrency; roundabout
Vance	7.250	11.668	SC 210 (Vance Road) – Bowman	
	8.500	13.679	SC 6 – Santee, Eutawville	Northern terminus
1.000 mi = 1.609 km; 1.000 km = 0.621 mi: Concurrency terminus
