= South Carolina Highway 47 =

Highway in South Carolina

South Carolina Highway 47
- Cleveland Street

Route information
- Maintained by SCDOT
- Length: 5.740 mi (9.238 km)
- Existed: 1930–present

Major junctions
- South end: US 301 near Elloree
- North end: SC 6 / SC 267 in Elloree

Location
- Country: United States
- State: South Carolina
- Counties: Orangeburg

Highway system
- South Carolina State Highway System; Interstate; US; State; Scenic
| ← SC 46 | → SC 48 |

South Carolina Highway 47 (SC 47) is a 5.740-mile (9.238 km) primary state highway in the U.S. state of South Carolina. It serves to connect the town of Elloree with U.S. Route 301 (US 301).

== Route description ==
SC 47 is a two-lane rural highway that connects the town of Elloree at SC 6/SC 267 southwest to US 301 located at Goodbys Swamp. The predominant features along the route is farmland; in Elloree, the downtown area the road is divided with parking on driver's right-side.

== History ==
Established in 1930 as a new primary routing, connecting SC 4 (currently US 301) and SC 45 (currently SC 6/SC 267); it is also the second SC 47. The entire highway was paved by 1938. In 1940, SC 47 was extended north, in concurrency with SC 6, to Lone Star, then northwest to SC 26 (currently US 601) near Singleton. In 1948 it was reverted to its original and current routing, leaving behind Lone Star Road (S-9-11).

The first SC 47 was an original state highway (1922) that traversed from SC 40 in Green Sea, northwest through Nichols and Lake View, before entering North Carolina. By 1926 was renumbered to SC 94.

== Major intersections ==
The entire route is in Orangeburg County.

| Location | mi | km | Destinations | Notes |
|---|---|---|---|---|
| | 0.000 | 0.000 | US 301 (Five Chop Road) – Santee, Orangeburg | Southern terminus |
| | 5.040 | 8.111 | SC 6 Truck east / SC 47 Truck north (Felderville Road) | Western terminus of SC 6 Truck; southern terminus of SC 47 Truck |
| Elloree | 5.740 | 9.238 | SC 6 / SC 267 (Main Street / SC 47 Truck south) / East Cleveland Street north – St. Matthews, Santee, Santee State Park | Northern terminus of SC 47 and SC 47 Truck |
1.000 mi = 1.609 km; 1.000 km = 0.621 mi

== Special routes ==
=== Elloree truck route ===
South Carolina Highway 47 Truck
- Location: Elloree, South Carolina
- Length: 1.080 mi (1.738 km)

South Carolina Highway 47 Truck (SC 47 Truck) is a 1.080-mile (1.738 km) truck route of SC 47 that exists mostly within the city limits of Elloree. It begins on Felderville Road (S-38-81) then onto Snider Street (S-38-1023); at Main Street, it goes back northwest, in concurrency with SC 6/SC 267, reuniting with SC 47 at its northern terminus. The portion on Felderville Road and Snider Street is also SC 6 Truck. A Food Lion distribution center is located in the town, the truck route provides an alternate route to that center.

The entire route is in Orangeburg County.

| Location | mi | km | Destinations | Notes |
|---|---|---|---|---|
| | 0.000 | 0.000 | SC 47 | Southern end of SC 6 Truck concurrency; western terminus of SC 6 Truck; southern terminus of SC 47 Truck |
| Elloree | 0.770 | 1.239 | SC 6 east / SC 267 south | Northern end of SC 6 Truck concurrency; Southern end of SC 6/SC 267 concurrency; eastern terminus of SC 6 Truck |
| Elloree | 1.080 | 1.738 | SC 6 west / SC 267 north / SC 47 south (Cleveland Street) – St. Matthews, Orangeburg, Santee State Park, Historic business district | Northern end of SC 6/SC 267 concurrency; northern terminus of SC 47 and SC 47 Truck |
1.000 mi = 1.609 km; 1.000 km = 0.621 mi: Concurrency terminus
