= South Carolina Highway 60 =

State highway in South Carolina, United States

South Carolina Highway 60
- Lake Murray Boulevard

Route information
- Maintained by SCDOT
- Length: 5.160 mi (8.304 km)
- Existed: 1929–present

Major junctions
- West end: SC 6 near Irmo
- I-26 / US 76 in Irmo
- East end: US 176 on the St. Andrews–Columbia line

Location
- Country: United States
- State: South Carolina
- Counties: Lexington, Richland

Highway system
- South Carolina State Highway System; Interstate; US; State; Scenic
← SC 59	→ SC 61

South Carolina Highway 60 (SC 60) is a 5.160-mile (8.304 km) primary state highway in the U.S. state of South Carolina. It serves the town of Irmo, connecting nearby Lake Murray and Harbison State Forest.

== Route description ==
SC 60 is a mostly four-lane with median suburban highway that travels 5.16 miles (8.30 km) from SC 6 to U.S. Route 176 (US 176), with an interchange with Interstate 26 (I-26)/US 76.

== History ==
SC 60 was established in 1929 as a new primary routing. The route has remained unchanged since inception, though its eastern endpoint was originally US 76/SC 2; the highway was widened to mostly four lanes with median by 2000.

== Junction list ==
County	Location	mi	km	Destinations	Notes
Lexington		0.000	0.000	SC 6 (Lake Drive) / Bush River Road east – Lexington, Ballentine	Western terminus of SC 60 and Bush River Road
Richland	Irmo	3.720– 3.744	5.987– 6.025	I-26 / US 76 – Columbia, Spartanburg	I-26 exit 102A–B
Richland	St. Andrews–Columbia line	5.160	8.304	US 176 – Columbia, Newberry	Eastern terminus
1.000 mi = 1.609 km; 1.000 km = 0.621 mi
