= South Carolina Highway 314 =

State highway in South Carolina, United States

South Carolina Highway 314
- Bunch Ford Road

Route information
- Maintained by SCDOT
- Length: 2.610 mi (4.200 km)

Major junctions
- West end: US 15 near Holly Hill
- East end: US 176 near Holly Hill

Location
- Country: United States
- State: South Carolina
- Counties: Orangeburg

Highway system
- South Carolina State Highway System; Interstate; US; State; Scenic
← SC 311	→ SC 315

South Carolina Highway 314 (SC 314) is a 2.610-mile-long (4.200 km) state highway in the U.S. state of South Carolina. The highway is essentially a connecting route between U.S. Route 15 (US 15) and US 176 in a rural part of Orangeburg County.

== Route description ==
SC 314 begins at an intersection with US 15 (Bass Drive) west-southwest of Holly Hill, within Orangeburg County. It travels to the northeast and curves to the north-northeast. It then curves to the east and meets its eastern terminus, an intersection with US 176 (Old State Road).

== Major intersections ==
The entire route is in Orangeburg County.

Location	mi	km	Destinations	Notes
	0.000	0.000	US 15 (Bass Drive) – St. George, Santee, Summerton	Western terminus
	2.610	4.200	US 176 (Old State Road) – Cameron, Holly Hill	Eastern terminus
1.000 mi = 1.609 km; 1.000 km = 0.621 mi
