= South Carolina Highway 69 =

South Carolina Highway 69 may refer to:

- South Carolina Highway 69 (1930s), a former state highway from Orangeburg to Cameron
- South Carolina Highway 69 (1939–1947), a former state highway from southwest of Pelion to Swansea
- South Carolina Highway 69 (1977–1981), a former state highway from Atlantic Beach to Cherry Grove Beach
