= Vontrell Jamison =

American football player (born 1982)

No. 68
- Position: Defensive end

Personal information
- Born: July 26, 1982 (age 44); Holly Hill, South Carolina, U.S.
- Listed height: 6 ft 6 in (1.98 m)
- Listed weight: 277 lb (126 kg)

Career information
- High school: Holly Hill-Roberts (SC)
- College: Clemson
- NFL draft: 2005: undrafted

Career history
- St. Louis Rams (2005)*; Dallas Cowboys (2005); New York Dragons (2007)
- * Offseason or practice squad member only
- Stats at ArenaFan.com

Vontrell Jamison (born July 26, 1982) is an American former football defensive end who played in the National Football League for the Dallas Cowboys. He also was a member of the New York Dragons in the Arena Football League. He played college football at Clemson University.

== Early life ==
Jamison was born in Holly Hill, South Carolina and attended Holly Hill-Roberts High School, where he lettered in football and basketball. As a senior, he tallied 52 tackles and 4 sacks. He enrolled at Gulf Coast Community College for one season before transferring to Clemson University.

As a sophomore, he played in 2 games, one at defensive end and the second at offensive tackle, after being switched in the middle of the season. As a junior he was moved back to defensive end, posting 27 tackles (2 for loss), 2 sacks and 10 quarterback pressures.

As a senior, he was already playing with a cast for a broken arm he suffered in preseason, when he had a torn Achilles tendon in the third game against Texas A&M University, collecting 5 tackles (one for loss) and one sack. After not being granted a hardship sixth year from the NCAA, he declared for the NFL draft. He finished his Clemson career with 32 tackles and 3 sacks.

== Professional career ==
=== St. Louis Rams ===
Jamison was signed as an undrafted free agent by the St. Louis Rams after the 2005 NFL draft on April 25, dropping because of his injury history. He was waived on August 30.

=== Dallas Cowboys ===
On November 2, 2005, he was signed by the Dallas Cowboys to their practice squad. On December 31, he was promoted to the active roster and was declared inactive for the final game, following an injury to linebacker Kevin Burnett. He was cut by the Cowboys on August 2, 2006.

=== New York Dragons ===
On February 10, 2007, he was signed by the New York Dragons of the Arena Football League. On April 12, he was traded to the Kansas City Brigade in exchange for defensive back DaShane Dennis, but was cut by the Brigade on April 30. On May 9, he was re-signed by the Dragons. He played in only one game because of injuries, making one tackle. He was released on August 6.

== Personal life ==
Jamison is the cousin of former NFL defensive linemen Chris Canty, the late Adrian Dingle and former NBA player Harold Jamison.
