= South Carolina Highway 311 =

State highway in South Carolina, United States

Route information
- Length: 9.250 mi (14.886 km)

Major junctions
- West end: US 176 in Sandridge
- East end: SC 6 south of Cross

Location
- Country: United States
- State: South Carolina
- Counties: Berkeley

Highway system
- South Carolina State Highway System; Interstate; US; State; Scenic
← SC 310	→ SC 314

South Carolina Highway 311 (SC 311) is a 9.250-mile-long (14.886 km) state highway in the southeastern part of the U.S. state of South Carolina. The highway travels in a west-to-east orientation from Sandridge, which is approximately six miles (9.7 km) southeast of Holly Hill, to a point approximately four miles (6.4 km) south of Cross.

== Route description ==
SC 311 begins at an intersection with U.S. Route 176 (US 176) in Sandridge. The route heads northeast, and then east to its eastern terminus, an intersection with SC 6, south of Cross.

SC 311 is not part of the National Highway System, a system of roadways important to the nation's economy, defense, and mobility.

== Major intersections ==
The entire route is in Berkeley County.

Location	mi	km	Destinations	Notes
Sandridge	0.000	0.000	US 176 (State Road) – Holly Hill, Goose Creek	Western terminus
	9.250	14.886	SC 6 (Ranger Drive) – Cross, Moncks Corner	Eastern terminus
1.000 mi = 1.609 km; 1.000 km = 0.621 mi
