= Dantzler Plantation =

Historic house in South Carolina, United States

- U.S. National Register of Historic Places
- Location within South Carolina Location within the United States
- Location: 2755 Vance Rd., near Holly Hill, South Carolina
- Coordinates: 33.41657°N 80.50517°W
- Area: 24.5 acres (9.9 ha)
- Built: c. 1846-1850
- Architectural style: Greek Revival
- NRHP reference No.: 07000098
- Added to NRHP: March 1, 2007

Dantzler Plantation, also known as Four Hole Plantation House or SunnySide House, is a historic plantation house located near Holly Hill, Orangeburg County, South Carolina. It was built about 1846–1850, and is a two-story, frame raised cottage in the Greek Revival style. It features a front portico. The main block is connected at the rear to a 1 1/2-story kitchen structure. The property includes a contributing oak allee and an entry gate.

It was added to the National Register of Historic Places in 2007.
