= South Carolina Highway 69 (1939–1947) =

Former state highway in South Carolina, United States

South Carolina Highway 69

Route information
- Maintained by SCDOT
- Existed: 1939–1947

Major junctions
- West end: SC 546 southwest of Pelion
- US 178 in Pelion
- East end: SC 6 in Swansea

Location
- Country: United States
- State: South Carolina
- Counties: Lexington

Highway system
- South Carolina State Highway System; Interstate; US; State; Scenic
← SC 68	→ SC 70

South Carolina Highway 69 (SC 69) was a state highway that existed in the southern part of Lexington County. It connected Pelion with Swansea.

== Route description ==
SC 69 began at an intersection with SC 546 (now Cedar Creek Road) southwest of Pelion. It traveled to the northeast to an intersection with U.S. Route 178 (US 178) in Pelion. It then proceeded to the east-southeast to SC 6 in Swansea.

== History ==
SC 32 was established in 1939 from Pelion to Swansea. In 1942, it was extended to its newer western terminus. It was decommissioned in 1947. It was downgraded to secondary roads.

== Major intersections ==
The entire route was in Lexington County.

Location	mi	km	Destinations	Notes
			SC 546	Western terminus; now Cedar Creek Road
Pelion			US 178	
Swansea			SC 6	Eastern terminus
1.000 mi = 1.609 km; 1.000 km = 0.621 mi
