= South Carolina Aeronautics Commission =

Agency overview
- Formed: 1935
- Jurisdiction: South Carolina
- Parent department: South Carolina Fiscal Accountability Authority
- Website: http://www.scaeronautics.com/

The South Carolina Aeronautics Commission (SCAC) is a government agency in the U.S. state of South Carolina. The SCAC, in conjunction with the Federal Aviation Administration, is "responsible for collecting, validating, and distributing the operational status of all aspects of the state’s air traffic facilities, in addition to the safety of the people in these locations." The agency also promulgates rules and regulations of airports and administers airport grants in the state.

The SCAC was created in 1935 by an act of the South Carolina General Assembly. Unlike most state aeronautics agencies in the Southeastern United States, the SCAC is not a part of the state's department of transportation.
