= Adrian Dingle (American football) =

American football player (1977–2022)

No. 90
- Position: Defensive end

Personal information
- Born: June 25, 1977; Holly Hill, South Carolina, U.S.
- Died: November 8, 2022 (aged 45); Winthrop, Massachusetts, U.S.
- Listed height: 6 ft 3 in (1.91 m)
- Listed weight: 272 lb (123 kg)

Career information
- High school: Holly Hill (SC) Roberts
- College: Clemson
- NFL draft: 1999: 5th round, 139th overall pick

Career history
- San Diego Chargers (1999–2004)

Awards and highlights
- Second-team All-ACC (1998)

Career NFL statistics
- Total tackles: 95
- Sacks: 14.5
- Forced fumbles: 3
- Fumble recoveries: 2
- Interceptions: 1
- Stats at Pro Football Reference

Adrian Kennell Dingle (June 25, 1977 – November 8, 2022) was an American professional football player who was a defensive tackle in the National Football League (NFL). He played five seasons for the San Diego Chargers from 2000 to 2005.

Dingle went to Roberts high school in Holly Hill, South Carolina. He then attended Clemson University, where he broke the single-season sacks record with 10.5 in his senior year. His 23 career sacks ranks third best in school history and is sixth all-time with 45 tackles for loss. Dingle was selected in the fifth round of the 1999 NFL draft. He missed the entire 1999 season due to injury. He started 15 out of 16 games during the 2003 season, making 37 tackles and six sacks. He finished his career with 78 tackles, 14.5 sacks, two forced fumbles, and one interception. He was the cousin of former Dallas Cowboys defensive end Vontrell Jamison.

Dingle died in Winthrop, Massachusetts, on November 8, 2022, at the age of 45. He is survived by his wife Amy Bell, son Adrian (2018) and daughter Ava (2020).
