= Providence, South Carolina =

- Unincorporated community
- Location within South Carolina Location within the United States
- Coordinates: 33°23′34″N 80°32′31″W
- Country: United States
- State: South Carolina
- County: Orangeburg
- Elevation: 112 ft (34 m)
- Time zone: UTC-5 (Eastern (EST))
  - Summer (DST): UTC-4 (EDT)
- Area codes: 803, 839
- GNIS feature ID: 1242788

Providence is an unincorporated community in Orangeburg County, South Carolina, United States. Providence is located at the junction of U.S. Route 176 and South Carolina Highway 210, northeast of Bowman.
