= Harbison State Forest =

State forest in South Carolina, United States

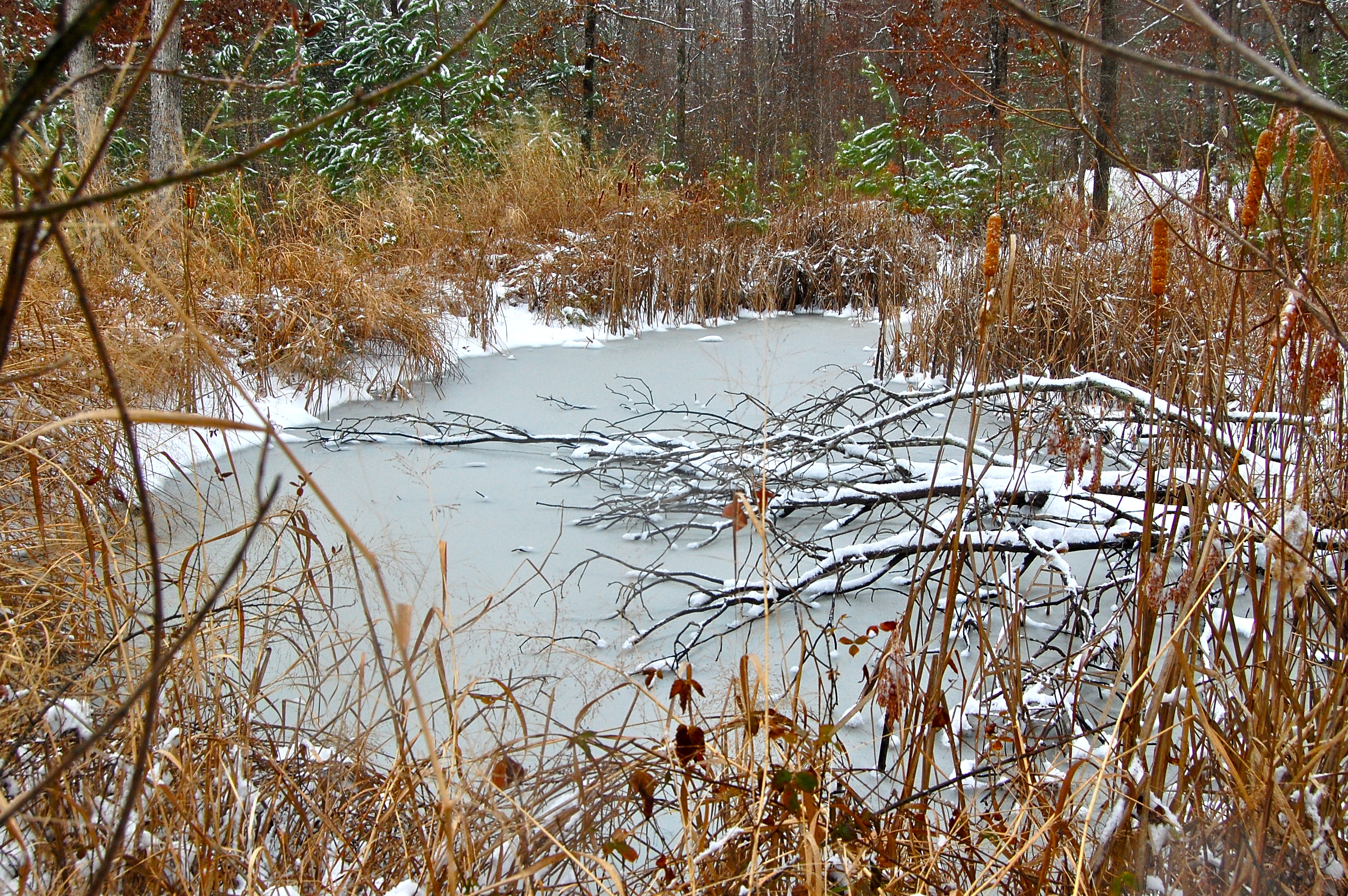
- Vernal Pond lies at the heart of Harbison State Forest.
- Interactive map of Harbison State Forest
- Location: Columbia, Richland County, South Carolina, United States
- Coordinates: 34°5′34″N 81°7′32″W
- Area: 2,177 acres (8.81 km^{2})
- Named for: Samuel P. Harbison
- Governing body: South Carolina Forestry Commission
- Website: Harbison State Forest

Harbison State Forest is a State Forest in Richland County, South Carolina. It is named for Samuel P. Harbison of Pittsburgh, Pennsylvania, who provided the majority of funds for the land purchase.

The forest is found in the Midlands region of central South Carolina and comprises 2,177 acres (881.0 ha) of woodland, meadowland, and bottomland located alongside the Broad River in Richland County, South Carolina. Located approximately 8 miles from the downtown area Columbia, South Carolina, Harbison State Forest is one of the largest urban green spaces inside city limits in the eastern United States.

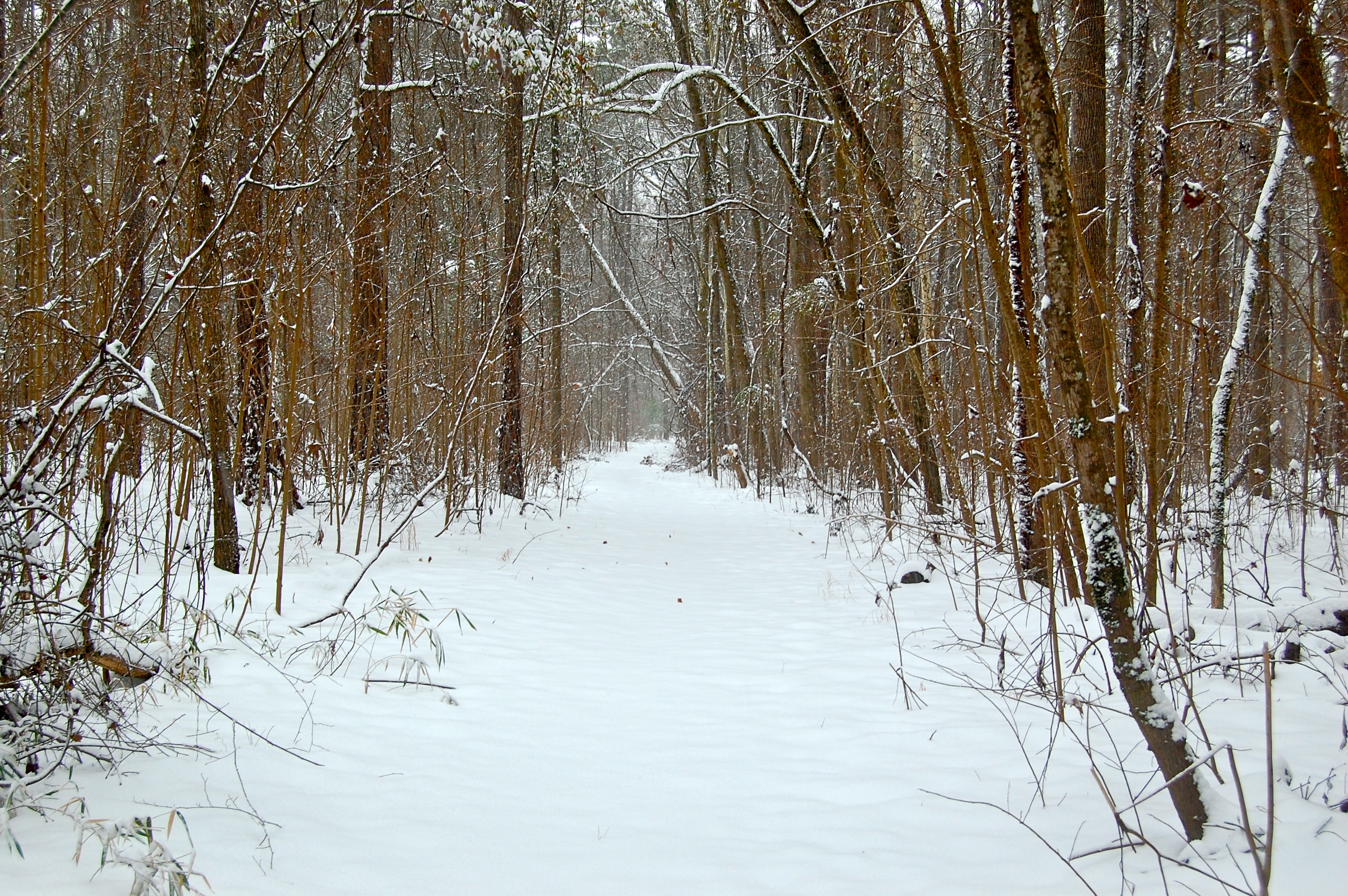
