= Wells, South Carolina =

- Unincorporated community
- Location within South Carolina Location within the United States
- Coordinates: 33°22′18″N 80°28′50″W
- Country: United States
- State: South Carolina
- County: Orangeburg
- Elevation: 102 ft (31 m)
- Time zone: UTC-5 (Eastern (EST))
  - Summer (DST): UTC-4 (EDT)
- Area codes: 803, 839
- GNIS feature ID: 1227469

Wells is an unincorporated community in Orangeburg County, South Carolina, United States. It is located at the junction of U.S. Route 15 and U.S. Route 176, northwest of Holly Hill.
