= Santee State Park =

Park on Lake Marion in South Carolina

- Interactive map of Santee State Park
- Nearest city: Santee, South Carolina
- Coordinates: 33°31′05″N 80°29′20″W
- Area: 2,500 acres (10.1 km^{2})
- Created: 1942
- Open: 1949
- Camp sites: 158 camping sites.
- Hiking trails: 4
- Other information: boating, hiking, camping, birding, canoeing and kayaking
- Website: https://southcarolinaparks.com/santee

Santee State Park is in the Sandhills of South Carolina on the western edge of the 110,000-acre (445 km^{2}) Lake Marion. It is located off SC 6, three miles (5 km) northwest of the town of Santee and I-95.

The park offers boating, hiking, camping, birding, canoeing and kayaking. Well known for fishing, this park offers a chance to catch record size Largemouth Bass. Other fish that abound are Striped bass, Channel catfish, Trout, White Perch, White bass, Crappie, Shellcrackers and Bream and Chain (Jack). Lake Marion can be accessed by two boat ramps that the park has.

The 2,500-acre (10.1 km^{2}) park was created in 1942 when Orangeburg County donated the land. It has 2 campgrounds. Cypress View Campground has 50 sites and Lakeshore Campground has 108 sites. Restroom facilities with hot showers are accessible by both campgrounds. Many sites can accommodate RVs up to 40 feet in length. There are also 30 rondette cabins, each with 2 bedrooms and 1 bath, 10 of which are on piers over the lake.

The park has 3 hiking trails and 1 biking trail. The "Limestone Nature Trail" and the "Oak Pinolly Nature Trail" are 1 mile hiking trails. The "Sinkhole Pond Nature Trail" is a half mile hiking trail. The biking trail is 7 miles long.
