= Harleyville, South Carolina =

Town in Dorchester County, South Carolina, United States

- Town
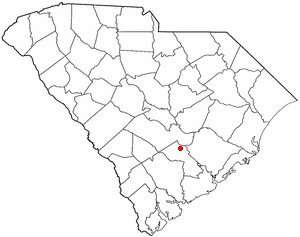
- Location of Harleyville, South Carolina
- Coordinates: 33°12′47″N 80°26′52″W
- Country: United States
- State: South Carolina
- County: Dorchester
- Incorporated: 1893

Area
  - Total: 1.06 sq mi (2.75 km^{2})
  - Land: 1.06 sq mi (2.75 km^{2})
  - Water: 0 sq mi (0.00 km^{2})
- Elevation: 89 ft (27 m)

Population (2020)
  - Total: 666
  - Density: 627.0/sq mi (242.07/km^{2})
- Time zone: UTC-5 (Eastern (EST))
  - Summer (DST): UTC-4 (EDT)
- ZIP code: 29448
- Area codes: 843, 854
- FIPS code: 45-32335
- GNIS feature ID: 2406643
- Website: www.harleyvillesc.gov

Harleyville is a town in Dorchester County, South Carolina, United States. The population was 666 at the 2020 census, down slightly from 677 at the 2010 census. Harleyville is part of the Charleston-North Charleston-Summerville metropolitan area.

== History ==
Harleyville was named after the Harley family.

The St. Paul Camp Ground was added to the National Register of Historic Places in 1998.

== Geography ==
Harleyville is located in northern Dorchester County. U.S. Route 178 passes through the center of town, leading northwest 31 miles (50 km) to Orangeburg and southeast 7 miles (11 km) to its terminus at U.S. Route 78. South Carolina Highway 453 leads north 1 mile (1.6 km) to Exit 177 on Interstate 26; I-26 leads northwest 68 miles (109 km) to Columbia and southeast 45 miles (72 km) to Charleston.

According to the United States Census Bureau, the town has a total area of 1.2 square miles (3.0 km^{2}), all of it land. The Audubon's Francis Beidler forest is located just outside of town. Within the park, there are miles of boardwalks through the old four hole swamp.

== Demographics ==
Historical population
| Census | Pop. | Note | %± |
|---|---|---|---|
| 1900 | 248 | | — |
| 1910 | 295 | | 19.0% |
| 1920 | 353 | | 19.7% |
| 1930 | 371 | | 5.1% |
| 1940 | 381 | | 2.7% |
| 1950 | 483 | | 26.8% |
| 1960 | 561 | | 16.1% |
| 1970 | 704 | | 25.5% |
| 1980 | 606 | | −13.9% |
| 1990 | 633 | | 4.5% |
| 2000 | 594 | | −6.2% |
| 2010 | 677 | | 14.0% |
| 2020 | 666 | | −1.6% |
U.S. Decennial Census

As of the census of 2010, there were 693 people, 250 households, and 165 families residing in the town. The population density was 601.1 inhabitants per square mile (232.1/km^{2}). There were 282 housing units at an average density of 285.4 per square mile (110.2/km^{2}). The racial makeup of the town was 59.26% White, 38.38% African American, 0.67% Native American, 0.17% from other races, and 1.52% from two or more races. Hispanic or Latino of any race were 1.18% of the population.

There were 250 households, out of which 31.2% had children under the age of 18 living with them, 38.0% were married couples living together, 22.0% had a female householder with no husband present, and 34.0% were non-families. 30.8% of all households were made up of individuals, and 16.4% had someone living alone who was 65 years of age or older. The average household size was 2.38 and the average family size was 2.99.

In the town, the population was spread out, with 28.3% under the age of 18, 7.6% from 18 to 24, 23.6% from 25 to 44, 24.6% from 45 to 64, and 16.0% who were 65 years of age or older. The median age was 38 years. For every 100 females, there were 83.3 males. For every 100 females age 18 and over, there were 75.3 males.

The median income for a household in the town was $26,397, and the median income for a family was $35,313. Males had a median income of $33,083 versus $21,875 for females. The per capita income for the town was $16,412. About 23.1% of families and 43.4% of the population were below the poverty line, including 25.2% of those under age 18 and 22.9% of those age 65 or over.

== See also ==
- List of municipalities in South Carolina
