= Vance, South Carolina =

- Town
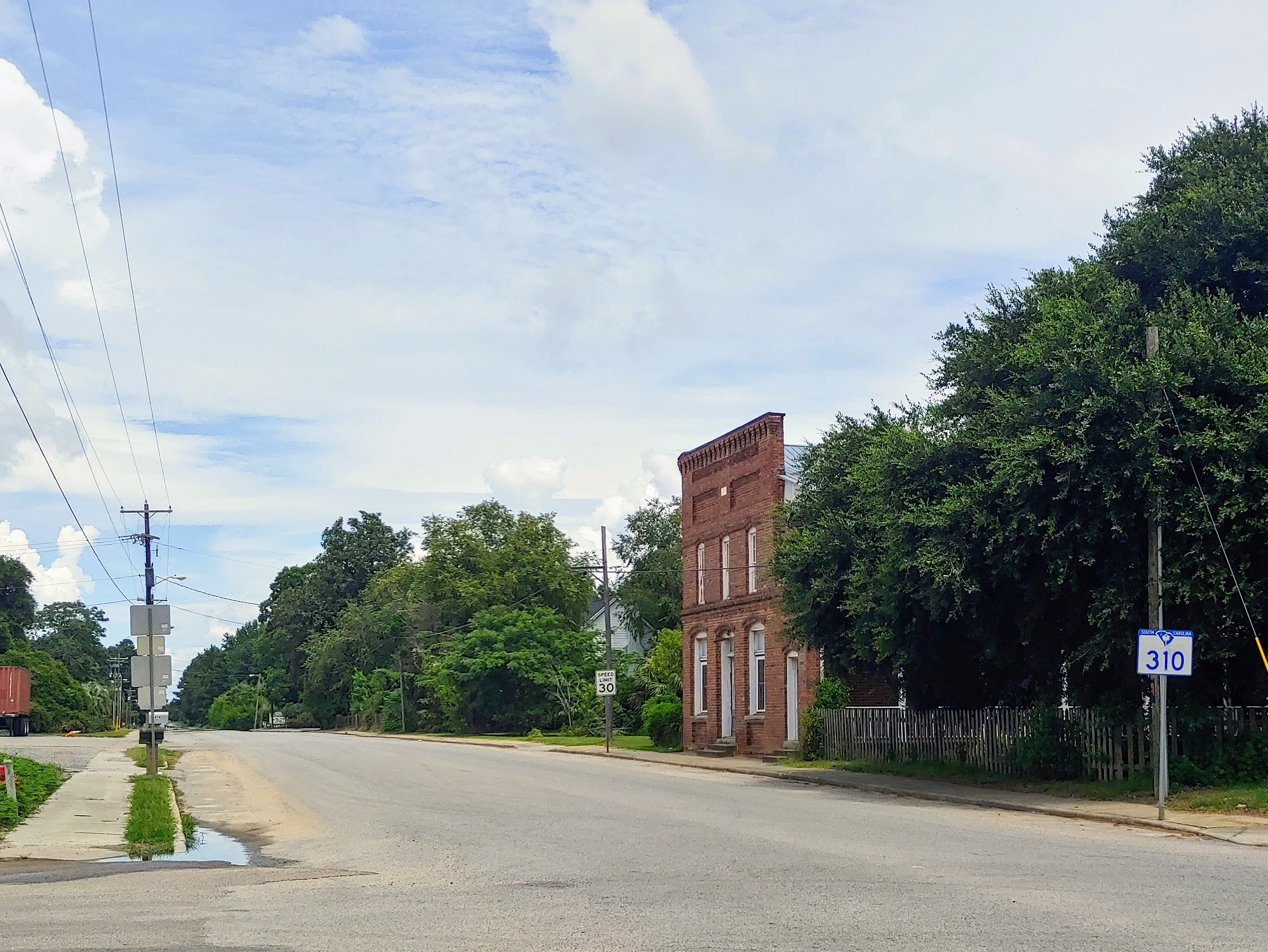
- Street scene in Vance

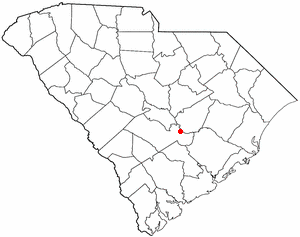
- Location of Vance, South Carolina
- Coordinates: 33°26′10″N 80°25′11″W
- Country: United States
- State: South Carolina
- County: Orangeburg
- Founded as Vance's Ferry: 1766; 260 years ago
- Incorporated as Vance: 18 December 1891; 134 years ago

Area
  - Total: 0.51 sq mi (1.31 km^{2})
  - Land: 0.51 sq mi (1.31 km^{2})
  - Water: 0 sq mi (0.00 km^{2})
- Elevation: 125 ft (38 m)

Population (2020)
  - Total: 128
  - Density: 252.3/sq mi (97.43/km^{2})
- Time zone: UTC-5 (Eastern (EST))
  - Summer (DST): UTC-4 (EDT)
- ZIP code: 29163
- Area codes: 803, 839
- FIPS code: 45-73510
- GNIS feature ID: 2406788
- Website: http://www.vancesc.com/

Vance is a town in Orangeburg County, South Carolina, United States. As of the 2020 census, Vance had a population of 128.

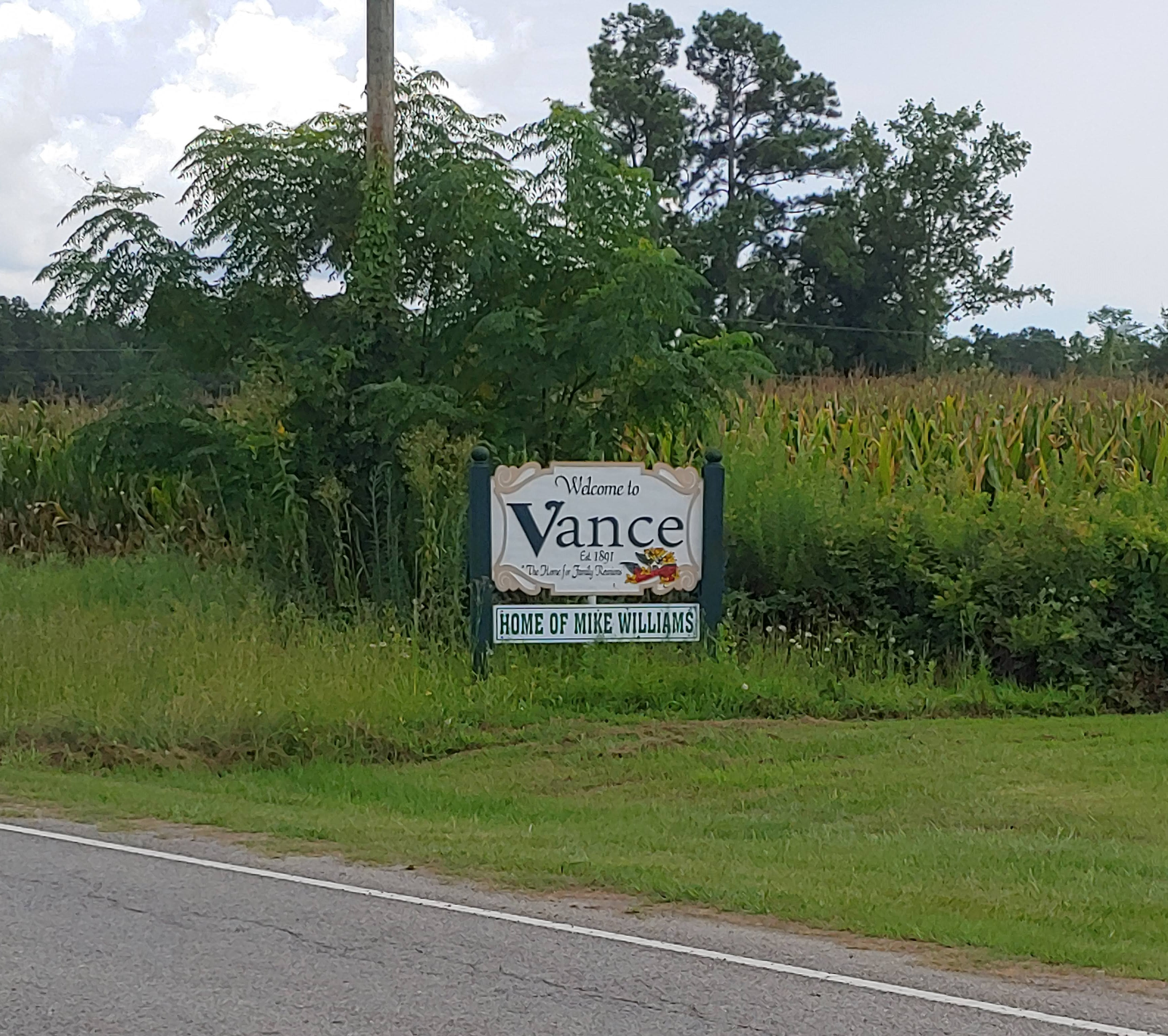
Welcome sign on State Road 210 - Vance, SC

== History ==
Vance was previously called Vance's Ferry. Sir William Vance established the ferry about 1766, which served as a crucial shipping link for cotton and trade between Charleston and the upcountry. The ferry was used for over a century by merchants and travellers to cross the Santee River and connect to other towns and cities. The inlet off the river was a convenient place to moor small trading skiffs. Bridge construction and railroad construction decreased river freighting. Over the centuries the town center remained on higher ground along Old Number Six Highway, which originally was a Native American trail. The Town of Vance was incorporated on December 18, 1891 for 30 years. It was re-chartered on April 13, 1921.

In the 1940s the river was dammed for hydroelectric power, forming Lake Marion. Although the dam changed the shoreline of the inlet, the location still contains private docks, a marina, and several businesses oriented toward recreation on the lake.

The Town Hall manages The Family & Friend Center, which can be rented for various events.

== Geography ==
According to the United States Census Bureau, the town has a total area of 0.5 square mile (1.3 km^{2}), all land.

== Demographics ==
Historical population
Census	Pop.	Note	%±
1900	81		—
1910	97		19.8%
1920	124		27.8%
1930	121		−2.4%
1940	125		3.3%
1950	106		−15.2%
1960	85		−19.8%
1970	54		−36.5%
1980	89		64.8%
1990	214		140.4%
2000	208		−2.8%
2010	170		−18.3%
2020	128		−24.7%
U.S. Decennial Census

=== 2020 census ===
Vance town, South Carolina – Racial and ethnic composition Note: the US Census treats Hispanic/Latino as an ethnic category. This table excludes Latinos from the racial categories and assigns them to a separate category. Hispanics/Latinos may be of any race.
Race / Ethnicity (NH = Non-Hispanic)	Pop 2000	Pop 2010	Pop 2020	% 2000	% 2010	% 2020
White alone (NH)	30	17	17	14.42%	10.00%	13.28%
Black or African American alone (NH)	176	135	104	84.62%	79.41%	81.25%
Native American or Alaska Native alone (NH)	1	5	2	0.48%	2.94%	1.56%
Asian alone (NH)	0	11	1	0.00%	6.47%	0.78%
Native Hawaiian or Pacific Islander alone (NH)	0	0	0	0.00%	0.00%	0.00%
Other race alone (NH)	0	0	0	0.00%	0.00%	0.00%
Mixed race or Multiracial (NH)	1	1	3	0.48%	0.59%	2.34%
Hispanic or Latino (any race)	0	1	1	0.00%	0.59%	0.78%
Total	208	170	128	100.00%	100.00%	100.00%

As of the census of 2000, there were 208 people, 67 households, and 50 families residing in the town. The population density was 414.1 inhabitants per square mile (159.9/km^{2}). There were 71 housing units at an average density of 141.4 per square mile (54.6/km^{2}). The racial makeup of the town was 14.42% White, 84.62% African American, 0.48% Native American, and 0.48% from two or more races.

There were 67 households, out of which 35.8% had children under the age of 18 living with them, 41.8% were married couples living together, 31.3% had a female householder with no husband present, and 23.9% were non-families. 22.4% of all households were made up of individuals, and 11.9% had someone living alone who was 65 years of age or older. The average household size was 3.10 and the average family size was 3.65.

In the town, the population was spread out, with 34.1% under the age of 18, 7.7% from 18 to 24, 26.9% from 25 to 44, 18.3% from 45 to 64, and 13.0% who were 65 years of age or older. The median age was 33 years. For every 100 females, there were 80.9 males. For every 100 females age 18 and over, there were 53.9 males.

The median income for a household in the town was $16,250, and the median income for a family was $26,250. Males had a median income of $26,094 versus $11,719 for females. The per capita income for the town was $8,787. About 29.8% of families and 38.5% of the population were below the poverty line, including 60.5% of those under the age of eighteen and 25.9% of those 65 or over.

== Notable people ==
- Nate Snell, former pitcher for the Baltimore Orioles.
- Mike Williams, current NFL player for the Pittsburgh Steelers
