= South Carolina Department of Transportation =

State government agency in the United States

South Carolina Department of Transportation (SCDOT)

Agency overview
- Formed: May 13, 1977
- Preceding agencies: South Carolina Highway Commission; South Carolina Department of Transportation and Highway Safety
- Headquarters: 955 Park St, Columbia, SC 29201
- Agency executive: Justin P. Powell, Secretary of Transportation
- Website: scdot.org

The South Carolina Department of Transportation (SCDOT) is a government agency in the US state of South Carolina. Its mission is to build and maintain roads and bridges and administer mass transit services.

By state law, the SCDOT's function and purpose is the systematic planning, construction, maintenance, and operation of the state highway system and the development of a statewide mass transit system that is consistent with the needs and desires of the public. The SCDOT also coordinates all state and federal programs relating to highways. The goal of the SCDOT is to provide adequate, safe, and efficient transportation services for the movement of people and goods.

== History ==
The South Carolina state transportation system originated in the late 1890s after the South Carolina Good Roads Association (SCGRA) was formed. The SCGRA, which was backed by local businessmen and railroads, often had state officials including the governor, attend its biannual meetings. It first promoted the construction of stone farm-to-market roads and by the 1920s pivoted to promoting the construction of hard-surfaced interstate and instrastate highways. The association also promoted the creation of a state highway commission and department.

Spurred on by the Federal Aid Road Act of 1916, which provided $75 million of federal money in 50–50 matching funds to the states to build up to 6% of their roads statewide over a five-year period, the General Assembly created the five-member State Highway Commission in 1917 which existed for more than seventy years. Prior to the Commission's creation, county governments were entirely responsible for building and maintaining roads.

In the 1920s, several key changes to transportation in South Carolina occurred. First, in 1922, federal highways were first constructed in the state (the first federal interstate highway in South Carolina, I-85, would not be completed until 1965). Then, in 1924, Governor Thomas G. McLeod signed the Pay-As-You-Go Highway Act, which created the state highway system. The General Reimbursement Act, passed in 1926, "authorized counties to issue bonds for highway construction" and the 1929 State Highway Bond Act "enabled the highway department to fund construction of a statewide highway system by issuing bonds, allowing the agency to abandon its pay-as-you-go formula."

Nonetheless, the State Highway Commission lacked "the authority to designate roads to be improved with federal funds and the power to supervise directly the work being done". Instead the state legislature had that authority, which resulted in a proliferation of roads in the state meant to create economic development in each legislator's district.

On May 13, 1977, an act of the South Carolina General Assembly reformed the state's transportation agency by creating the Department of Highways and Public Transportation (SCDHPT). The SCDHPT itself was later split into two separate organizations in 1993: the SCDOT and the Department of Public Safety.

== Organization ==
The SCDOT is a department of the state government in the executive branch that reports to a cabinet secretary and a nine-member commission. Unlike most state aeronautics agencies in the Southeastern United States, the South Carolina Aeronautics Commission is not a division within the SCDOT.

=== Commission and Secretary ===
The Governor appoints all of the commissioners, with seven of the commissioners representing each of South Carolina's U.S. Congressional districts and two of the commissioners being at-large. The two at-large commissioners must be confirmed by both houses of the state General Assembly.

The current transportation secretary is Christy A. Hall. The secretary hires the division heads, who are known as Deputy Secretaries.

=== Divisions of the SCDOT ===
The SCDOT has six divisions: Engineering, Intermodal Planning, Finance and Procurement, Legal, Human Resources, and Minority & Small Business Affairs.

The SCDOT is a centralized government agency. Planning, design, procurement, finance, and human resource functions all operate from the central office, or headquarters, in the state capitol of Columbia. The headquarters building is named for Silas N. Pearman, a former state highway engineer and chief commissioner of the agency.

==== Intermodal Planning Division ====
The Intermodal Planning Division comprises the Department of Planning and the Office of Public Transit. The latter oversees and supports the development of a mass transit system and administers the state and federal aid mass transit program.

==== Engineering Division ====
The Engineering division is the largest part of the agency. The Deputy Secretary for this division is traditionally known as the State Highway Engineer. The current Deputy Secretary is Leland Colvin.

==== Finance and Procurement Division ====
The Division of Finance and Procurement is responsible for the federal aid reimbursements and other financial matters of the agency.

==== Engineering Districts ====
The SCDOT field offices are divided into seven districts headed by a District Engineering Administrator. The engineering district lines do not follow the same lines as the commission districts. Each District has responsibility for the maintenance, construction, traffic, and equipment (mechanical) operations within its boundaries. A district will oversee six to eight counties.

District offices are located in Columbia (District #1), Greenwood (#2), Greenville (#3), Chester, (#4), Florence (#5), Charleston (#6), Orangeburg (#7).

== 2016 arrests ==
In the summer of 2016, three former SCDOT employees were indicted by a grand jury on allegations that included, among other things, corruption and/or theft of agency property.

First, Charles W. Shirley, a former field operations manager for SCDOT, was charged with criminal conspiracy and official misconduct in office as well as eight other counts. The indictment alleged that while Shipley worked at SCDOT, "he maintained secret ownership in a company that was doing work for his own division at SCDOT, and that he participated in awarding the work to his company and then supervised that work."

Second, the former head of SCDOT’s traffic signal shop in District 1, Curtis C. Singleton, was charged with ten counts. The indictment alleged he "demanded and received cash bribes and kickbacks from contractors whose work he supervised and assigned."

Finally, a former SCDOT inspector, Joe Edward Butler, was indicted on eight counts. It was alleged in the indictment that Butler sold agency equipment to contractors and kept the money for himself and "received kickbacks and other financial benefits."

Shirley, who faced up to forty-six years in prison, died in September 2016, less than a month after he was charged with an additional four counts. In March 2017, Singleton pled guilty to seven counts, and Butler pled guilty to five.

== Current SCDOT Commissioners ==
SCDOT Commissioners
Name	District	Professional Experience
T.J. Johnson	First Congressional District	"Johnson owns and operates automobile dealerships in South Carolina from the Grand Strand to the Pee Dee" and is a past president of the South Carolina Automobile Dealers Association.
William B. "Bill" Dukes	Second Congressional District	Dukes owns a restaurant and catering company.
Pamela L. Christopher	Third Congressional District	Pamela Christopher previously worked as an "economic development executive to support local, regional, and state economic development efforts in three states— South Carolina, Georgia and Wisconsin."
Max K. Metcalf	Fourth Congressional District	"Metcalf was the Director of Transportation and Intergovernmental Relations in the Office of Governor Carroll A. Campbell, Jr.; District Administrator for the Office of Congressman Bob Inglis; and Vice President of Public Policy with the Greater Greenville Chamber of Commerce until joining BMW in 2001."
David E. "Gene" Branham, Sr.	Fifth Congressional District	Branham previously served for 20 years "as both a past chairman and a commissioner with the Kershaw County Transportation Committee."
John Barnwell Fishburne	Sixth Congressional District	Fishburne "is the owner of Fishburne and Company Development Corporation" and he served "several terms on the Colleton County Planning Commission."
Tony K. Cox	Seventh Congressional District	Cox is a "past chairman of the South Carolina Real Estate Commission and a former chairman of the Horry County Planning Commission."
Vacant	Governor's First At-Large Appointee	N/A
Vacant	Governor's Second At-Large Appointee	N/A

== Bibliography ==
- Moore, John Hammond (1987), The South Carolina Highway Department, 1917–1987, Columbia, South Carolina: University of South Carolina Press, ISBN 0-87249-528-0
