= Holly Hill, South Carolina =

- Town
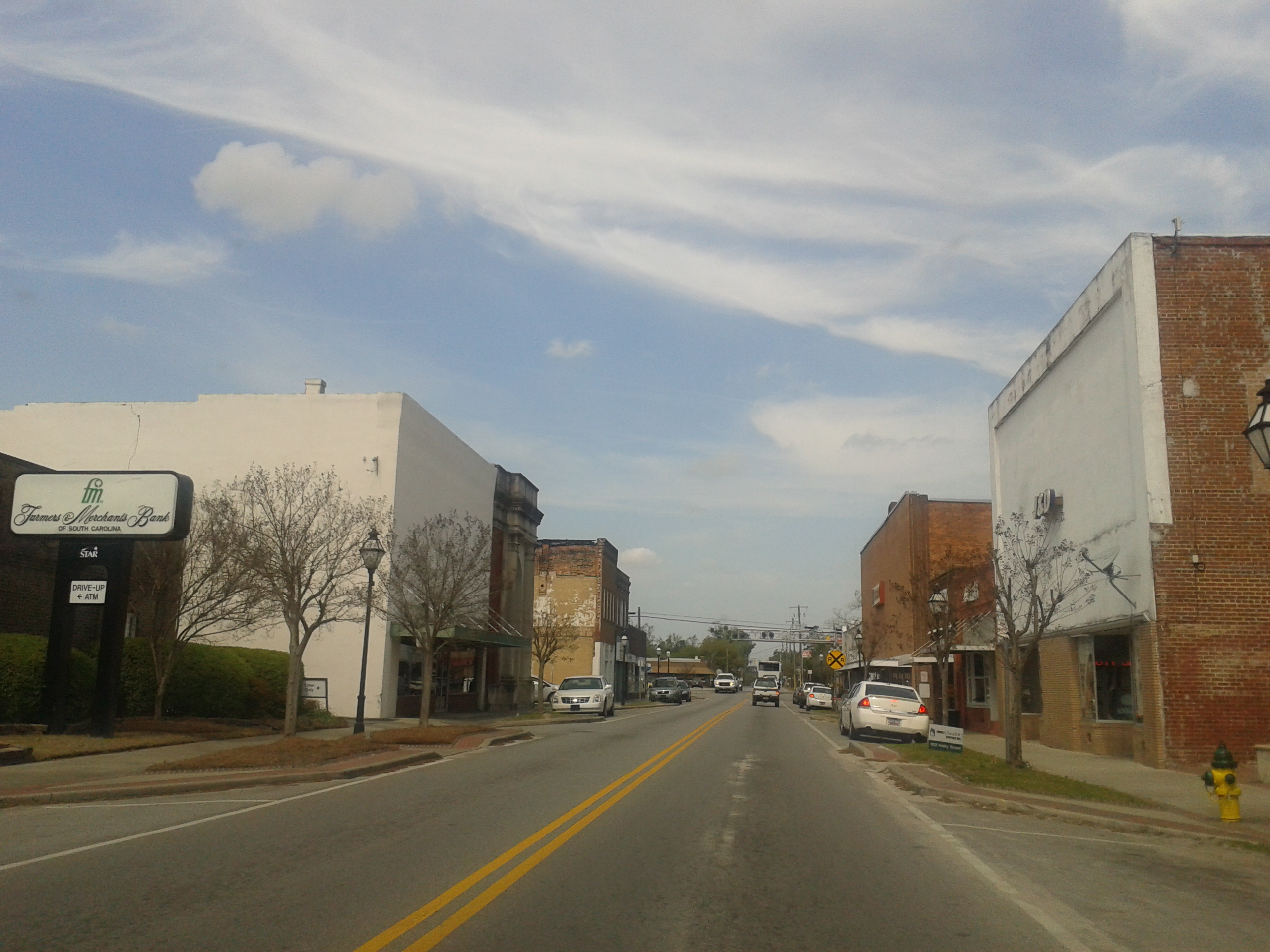
- Downtown Holly Hill in April 2015

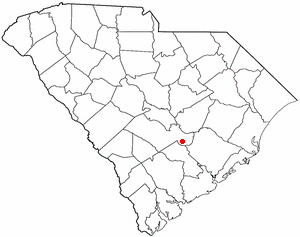
- Location in Orangeburg County, South Carolina
- Coordinates: 33°19′28″N 80°24′47″W
- Country: United States
- State: South Carolina
- County: Orangeburg

Area
  - Total: 1.31 sq mi (3.39 km^{2})
  - Land: 1.31 sq mi (3.39 km^{2})
  - Water: 0 sq mi (0.00 km^{2})
- Elevation: 105 ft (32 m)

Population (2020)
  - Total: 1,298
  - Density: 993.1/sq mi (383.45/km^{2})
- Time zone: UTC−5 (EST)
  - Summer (DST): UTC−4 (EDT)
- ZIP code: 29059
- Area code: 803, 839
- FIPS code: 45-34360
- GNIS feature ID: 2405851
- Website: Town website

Holly Hill is a town in Orangeburg County, South Carolina, United States. Prior to 1910 it was located in the northwest portion of Saint James Goose Creek Township. The population was 1,277 at the 2010 census.

As of 2023, the estimated population is 1,252.

== History ==
Dantzler Plantation and Providence Methodist Church are listed on the National Register of Historic Places.

== Geography ==
According to the United States Census Bureau, the town has a total area of 1.4 square miles (3.6 km^{2}), all land.

== Demographics ==
Historical population
Census	Pop.	Note	%±
1890	814		—
1900	256		−68.6%
1910	342		33.6%
1920	522		52.6%
1930	702		34.5%
1940	1,062		51.3%
1950	1,116		5.1%
1960	1,235		10.7%
1970	1,178		−4.6%
1980	1,785		51.5%
1990	1,478		−17.2%
2000	1,281		−13.3%
2010	1,277		−0.3%
2020	1,298		1.6%
U.S. Decennial Census

=== 2020 census ===
Holly Hill CDP, South Carolina – Racial and ethnic composition Note: the US Census treats Hispanic/Latino as an ethnic category. This table excludes Latinos from the racial categories and assigns them to a separate category. Hispanics/Latinos may be of any race.
Race / Ethnicity (NH = Non-Hispanic)	Pop 2000	Pop 2010	Pop 2020	% 2000	% 2010	% 2020
White alone (NH)	622	509	556	48.56%	39.86%	42.84%
Black or African American alone (NH)	640	699	657	49.96%	54.74%	50.62%
Native American or Alaska Native alone (NH)	5	8	14	0.39%	0.63%	1.08%
Asian alone (NH)	1	11	12	0.08%	0.86%	0.92%
Native Hawaiian or Pacific Islander alone (NH)	0	0	0	0.00%	0.00%	0.00%
Other race alone (NH)	0	1	1	0.00%	0.08%	0.08%
Mixed race or Multiracial (NH)	7	15	30	0.55%	1.17%	2.31%
Hispanic or Latino (any race)	6	34	28	0.47%	2.66%	2.16%
Total	1,281	1,277	1,298	100.00%	100.00%	100.00%

As of the 2020 United States census, there were 1,298 people, 507 households, and 321 families residing in the town.

=== 2000 census ===
As of the census of 2000, there were 1,281 people, 502 households, and 359 families residing in the town. The population density was 950.7 inhabitants per square mile (367.1/km^{2}). There were 575 housing units at an average density of 426.7 per square mile (164.7/km^{2}). The racial makeup of the town was 48.95% White, 50.04% African American, 0.39% Native American, 0.08% Asian, and 0.55% from two or more races. Hispanic or Latino of any race were 0.47% of the population.

There were 502 households, out of which 27.9% had children under the age of 18 living with them, 50.6% were married couples living together, 18.9% had a female householder with no husband present, and 28.3% were non-families. 26.5% of all households were made up of individuals, and 13.9% had someone living alone who was 65 years of age or older. The average household size was 2.53 and the average family size was 3.05.

In the town, the age distribution of the population shows 24.4% under the age of 18, 8.2% from 18 to 24, 23.8% from 25 to 44, 26.0% from 45 to 64, and 17.6% who were 65 years of age or older. The median age was 40 years. For every 100 females, there were 79.9 males. For every 100 females age 18 and over, there were 76.5 males.

The median income for a household in the town was $33,036, and the median income for a family was $43,611. Males had a median income of $36,944 versus $21,346 for females. The per capita income for the town was $16,437. About 10.7% of families and 15.7% of the population were below the poverty line, including 20.2% of those under age 18 and 14.3% of those age 65 or over.

== Education ==
Holly Hill has a public library, a branch of the Orangeburg County Library.

== Notable people ==
- Jimmie Coker (1936-1991)– former Major League Baseball player
- Frank Culbertson, Jr. – former NASA Space Shuttle astronaut
- Adrian Dingle - football player
- Brett Gardner – Major League Baseball player
- Willie Randolph – former Major League Baseball player and manager
- Eddie Sweat (1939-1998)– groom to U. S. Triple Crown winner Secretariat
- Mike Williams- NFL football player
