= U.S. Route 601 =

Highway in the United States

U.S. Route 601
- US 601 highlighted in red

Route information
- Auxiliary route of US 1
- Length: 316.3 mi (509.0 km)
- Existed: 1927–present

Major junctions
- South end: US 321 near Tarboro, SC
- US 78 in Bamberg, SC; I-26 near Orangeburg, SC; US 176 near St. Matthews, SC; I-20 near Lugoff, SC; US 1 in Camden, SC; US 74 in Monroe, NC; I-85 near Salisbury, NC; I-40 near Mocksville, NC; US 421 near Yadkinville, NC; I-74 near Mount Airy, NC
- North end: US 52 in Mount Airy, NC

Location
- Country: United States
- States: South Carolina, North Carolina
- Counties: SC: Jasper, Hampton, Colleton, Bamberg, Orangeburg, Calhoun, Richland, Kershaw, Lancaster, Chesterfield; NC: Union, Cabarrus, Rowan, Davie, Yadkin, Surry

Highway system
- United States Numbered Highway System; List; Special; Divided
← I-585	SC	→ SC 602
← NC 581	NC	→ NC 610

U.S. Route 601 (US 601) is a north–south United States highway that runs for 316.3 miles (509.0 km) from U.S. Route 321, near Tarboro, South Carolina, to U.S. Route 52, in Mount Airy, North Carolina. In North Carolina, it is one of the main north-south corridors connecting the cities of Salisbury, Mocksville, and Mount Airy.

== Route description ==
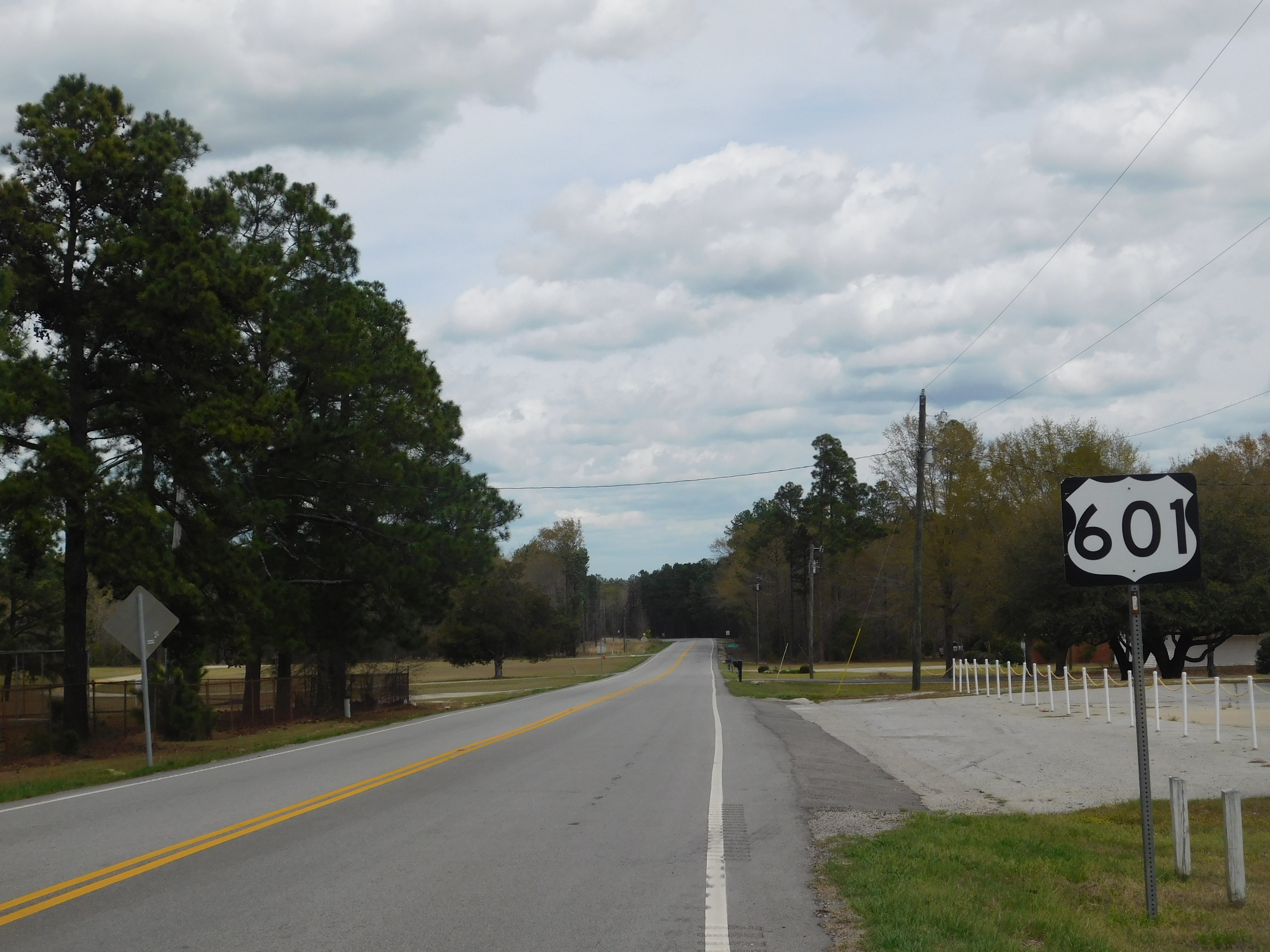
US 601 in Midway, from SC 903

=== South Carolina ===
US 601 begins at US 321 near Tarboro, SC and intersects with such highways as US 278 in Hampton. Beginning in Bamberg US 601 has an overlap with US 301, then intersects US 78. Within the vicinity of Orangeburg, the overlap with US 301 ends at US 21, then it encounters Interstate 26 at Exit 145. In the vicinity of Lugoff, US 601 encounters Interstate 20 at exit 92 near then begins another short overlap with its parent, US 1, which lasts until Camden where that concurrency is replaced by US 521 which last slightly longer than the previous one, ending in Kershaw. The route joins SC 9 three miles west of Pageland, then leaves SC 9 when it arrives in downtown Pageland before eventually crossing the North Carolina border.

=== North Carolina ===
US 601 southbound past US 74 Bypass in Monroe

After crossing the North–South Carolina border, US 601 intersects with such highways as US 74 in Monroe, which it shares a short concurrency with until the interchange with the northern terminus of NC 207. At the northern city limits of Monroe, it interchanges with the Monroe Expressway. Traveling north along what is now known as "Concord Highway" it encounters another intersection with the NC 24/NC 27 overlap in Midland and later an interchange with NC 49 south of Concord. Also in Concord, it joins US 29 which it overlaps until Interstate 85 at Exit 58 and runs along the interstate until it reaches Salisbury, at exit 75, then joins a brief concurrency with US 70. In Mocksville, the road has a short concurrency with US 64 beginning at the western terminus of US 158, and after leaving that overlap encounters Interstate 40 at exit 170. Further north it has an interchange with US 421 in Yadkinville, Interstate 74 at exit 11 near White Plains, and finally terminates at US 52 in Mount Airy.

== History ==
Established in 1927 as an original US Highway; the original routing was from US 1, in Cheraw, to US 17/US 76, in Florence.

In 1932, US 601 was extended north into North Carolina, replacing SC 96. In North Carolina US 601 was placed on concurrency with almost all of NC 80, from the South Carolina state line, near McFarlan, to downtown Mount Airy. In 1934, NC 80 was expunged from US 601.

In 1935, most of US 601 was replaced by the arrival of US 52. From Salisbury, North Carolina to Florence, South Carolina, the route was converted to US 52; which marked its departure from South Carolina.

Around 1952, US 601 was extended south from Salisbury. Starting with a concurrency with US 29 to Kannapolis, from there it followed US 29A to downtown Concord. Replacing NC 151, it continues south through Monroe and to the state line. In South Carolina, US 601 returns by replacing SC 151 from the border to Pageland. From there it replaced SC 902 and part of SC 265 to Kershaw. Between Kershaw and Camden, it overlaps with US 521, replacing SC 26 (SC 52 before 1935) from Camden to Orangeburg, then in concurrency with US 301 to Bamberg. Then finally replacing SC 36 to US 321, where it continues and ends with US 321 in Hardeeville.

In 1965, US 601 was realigned on new road bypassing west of downtown Concord, leaving a business loop. In 1970, US 601 was realigned on new road bypassing east of Dobson, leaving a business loop. In 1974, US 601 was extended to Interstate 95 in Hardeeville; however, by 1977, US 601 was truncated to its current southern terminus at US 321, near Tarboro. In 1979, US 601 was rerouted west of Salisbury, with concurrency with US 70; Innis Street was downgraded to secondary status. In the late 1980s, US 601 was rerouted onto Interstate 85, in Salisbury from exit 68 to exit 74; which was extended in the late 1990s, going south to exit 58 in Concord.

In 1999, US 601 was truncated to its current northern terminus at US 52 in Mount Airy.

=== South Carolina Highway 26 ===
South Carolina Highway 26
- Location: Orangeburg–Lugoff
- Existed: 1935–1951

South Carolina Highway 26 (SC 26) was an original state highway that was established in 1935 as a renumbering of SC 52 from U.S. Route 21 (US 21; now US 21/US 176) in St. Matthews to US 76 near the Wateree River. In July 1936, it was extended north to the Kershaw County line, east of Fort Jackson. In May 1937, SC 26 was extended again to US 1 in Lugoff. In November of that year, its path from the Eastover area to Lugoff was re-routed on new roadway. Its former path through Eastover was redesignated as SC 26 Alternate (US 26 Alt.) In 1940, its path in Richland County was straightened instead of a zigzag shape. Approximately 1948, its crossing of the Congaree River was shifted slightly to the east. In 1950, it was extended south to replace US 21 and ended at US 301 (now SC 33 in Orangeburg. The next year, SC 26 was decommissioned and redesignated as part of US 601.

==== Eastover alternate route ====
South Carolina Highway 26 Alternate
- Location: Eastover
- Existed: 1937–c.1942

South Carolina Highway 26 Alternate (SC 26 Alt.) was an alternate route that was established in November 1937 as a renumbering of SC 26 through Eastover. Around 1942, it was decommissioned. It was redesignated as SC 764 east outside of the town and SC 263 north outside of it.

=== South Carolina Highway 52 ===
South Carolina Highway 52
- Location: St. Matthews–Eastover
- Existed: c.1926–1935

South Carolina Highway 52 (SC 52) was a state highway that was established around 1926 from SC 31 / SC 45 (now US 601 and SC 6) in St. Matthews, through Wateree and Eastover, to SC 3 (now US 76/US 378) northwest of Eastover. In 1935, it was decommissioned and redesignated as SC 26. Today, most of its path is known as US 601 and SC 764.

=== South Carolina Highway 96 ===
South Carolina Highway 96
- Location: Cheraw, South Carolina
- Existed: 1926–1933

South Carolina Highway 96 (SC 96) was a state highway that was established in 1926 on a path from U.S. Route 1 (US 1) and SC 9 in Cheraw to the North Carolina state line, where the roadway continued as North Carolina Highway 80. In 1933, it was decommissioned, and its entire length became part of the original routing of US 601. Today, most of its path is part of US 52.

== Junction list ==
State	County	Location	mi	km	Exit	Destinations	Notes
South Carolina	Jasper	Tarboro	0.0	0.0		US 321 (Cotton Hill Road) – Hardeeville, Estill	
South Carolina	Jasper		3.3	5.3		SC 652 east (Calf Pen Bay Road)	
South Carolina	Jasper	Pineland	3.7	6.0		SC 462 (Gillison Branch) – Robertville, Grays	
South Carolina	Hampton	Furman	9.2	14.8		SC 333 west (Scotia-Furman Highway) – Scotia	
South Carolina	Hampton		14.0	22.5		SC 3 (Browning Gate Road) – Estill, Grays	
South Carolina	Hampton	Hampton	23.6	38.0		US 278 east / SC 363 east (Elm Street) – Varnville	East end of US 278 and SC 363 overlap
South Carolina	Hampton	Hampton	24.2	38.9		US 278 west / SC 363 west (Elm Street) – Brunson	West end of US 278 and SC 363 overlap
South Carolina	Colleton		36.7	59.1		SC 641 (Confederate Highway) – Walterboro	To Rivers Bridge State Park
South Carolina	Bamberg	Ehrhardt	41.8	67.3		SC 64 (Low Country Highway) – Barnwell, Walterboro, Charleston	
South Carolina	Bamberg	Bamberg	55.2	88.8		US 301 (Main Highway) – Allendale	South end of US 301 overlap
South Carolina	Bamberg	Bamberg	56.1	90.3		US 78 (Railroad Avenue) – Denmark, Summerville	
South Carolina	Orangeburg		61.7	99.3		SC 332 west (Slab Landing Road) – Cope, Norway	
South Carolina	Orangeburg		68.2	109.8		SC 70 west (Binnicker Bridge Road) – Denmark, Barnwell	
South Carolina	Orangeburg	Edisto	71.4	114.9		SC 4 west (Neeses Road) – Neeses	West end of SC 4 overlap
South Carolina	Orangeburg	Orangeburg	73.3	118.0		SC 33 east (Russell Street)	
South Carolina	Orangeburg	Orangeburg	73.4	118.1		SC 4 east (Stonewall Jackson Boulevard)	East end of SC 4 overlap
South Carolina	Orangeburg	Orangeburg	73.9	118.9		US 178 Bus. (Broughton Street) – North, Bowman	
South Carolina	Orangeburg	Orangeburg	74.4	119.7		US 301 north / US 21 Bus. south (Magnolia Street) – Santee, Branchville	North end of US 301 and south end of US 21 business overlap
South Carolina	Orangeburg	Orangeburg	74.6	120.1		SC 33 (Russell Street) – Cameron	
South Carolina	Orangeburg	Orangeburg	75.6	121.7		US 21 / US 178 (Chestnut Street) – North, Columbia, Bowman	North end of US 21 business overlap
South Carolina	Orangeburg	Orangeburg	79.5	127.9		I-26 – Columbia, Charleston	
South Carolina	Calhoun	Wertz Crossroads	85.7	137.9		US 176 (Old State Road) – Columbia, Cameron, Holly Hill	
South Carolina	Calhoun	St. Matthews	87.5	140.8		SC 6 (Old State Road) – Swansea, Columbia, Santee	
South Carolina	Calhoun	Wiles Crossroads	95.0	152.9		SC 419 (Fort Motte Road) – Fort Motte, Lone Star, Elloree	
South Carolina	Calhoun		96.4	155.1		SC 267 south (McCords Ferry Road) – Lone Star, Elloree	
South Carolina	Richland	Wateree	102.6	165.1		SC 48 west (Bluff Road) – Gadsden	To Congaree National Park
South Carolina	Richland		106.8	171.9		SC 764 west (Old Eastover Road) – Eastover	
South Carolina	Richland		109.5	176.2		SC 263 (Vanboklen Road) – Eastover, Sumter	
South Carolina	Richland		112.3	180.7		US 76 / US 378 (Garners Ferry Road) – Columbia, Sumter	
South Carolina	Richland	Leesburg	112.3	180.7		SC 262 west – Columbia	
South Carolina	Kershaw	Lugoff	129.8	208.9		I-20 / SC 12 west (Fort Jackson Road) – Columbia, Florence	
South Carolina	Kershaw	Lugoff	132.2	212.8		US 1 south (Jefferson Davis Highway) – Elgin	South end of US 1 overlap
South Carolina	Kershaw	Lugoff	132.6	213.4		SC 34 west (Ridgeway Road) – Ridgeway, Winnsboro	West end of SC 34 overlap
South Carolina	Kershaw	Camden	137.3	221.0		US 1 north / US 521 south / SC 34 east – Sumter, Bishopville, McBee	North end of US 1, south end of US 521, and east end of SC 34 overlap
South Carolina	Kershaw	Camden	139.4	224.3		SC 97 north (Liberty Hill Road) – Great Falls	
South Carolina	Lancaster	Kershaw	158.2	254.6		US 521 Bus. north / US 601 Bus. north (Hampton Street)	
South Carolina	Lancaster	Kershaw	158.9	255.7		US 521 north (Matson Street) – Heath Springs, Lancaster	North end of US 521 overlap
South Carolina	Lancaster	Kershaw	159.1	256.0		US 521 Bus. / US 601 Bus. south (Hampton Street)	
South Carolina	Lancaster		164.4	264.6		SC 265 east (Old Jefferson Highway) – Jefferson, Chesterfield	
South Carolina	Lancaster	Midway	166.0	267.2		SC 903 north (Flat Creek Road) – Lancaster	North end of SC 903 overlap
South Carolina	Lancaster	Midway	166.2	267.5		SC 903 south (Flat Creek Road) – McBee, Myrtle Beach	South end of SC 903 overlap
South Carolina	Chesterfield		175.9	283.1		SC 9 north – Lancaster	North end of SC 9 overlap
South Carolina	Chesterfield	Pageland	178.9	287.9		SC 207 north (Elm Street) – Monroe	
South Carolina	Chesterfield	Pageland	179.3	288.6		SC 9 south (McGregor Street) / SC 151 Bus. south (Pearl Street) – Chesterfield, Jefferson	South end of SC 9 and SC 151 business overlap
South Carolina	Chesterfield	Pageland	180.3	290.2		SC 151 south (Van Lingle Mungo Boulevard) – Jefferson, Darlington	North end of SC 151 business overlap
			182.7 0.0	294.0 0.0	South Carolina–North Carolina state line		
North Carolina	Union	Monroe	12.4	20.0		US 74 east (Roosevelt Boulevard)	East end of US 74 overlap
North Carolina	Union	Monroe	13.7	22.0		NC 200 north (Morgan Mill Road) – Stanfield, Locust	North end of NC 200 overlap
North Carolina	Union	Monroe	14.9	24.0		US 74 west / NC 200 south (Roosevelt Boulevard) – Charlotte NC 207 south (Skyway Drive) – Monroe Business District	West end of US 74 and south end of NC 200 overlap
North Carolina	Union	Monroe	17.0	27.4		US 74 Byp. (Monroe Expressway) – Charlotte, Rockingham	All-electronic toll road
North Carolina	Union	Fairview	24.8	39.9		NC 218 – Mint Hill, New Salem	
North Carolina	Cabarrus	Midland	33.3	53.6		NC 24 / NC 27 – Charlotte, Locust, Albemarle	To Reed Gold Mine Historic Site
North Carolina	Cabarrus		39.1	62.9		NC 200 south – Locust, Stanfield	
North Carolina	Cabarrus	Concord	42.7	68.7		NC 49 – Charlotte, Richfield	Interchange
North Carolina	Cabarrus	Concord	42.9	69.0		NC 3 north (Union Street)	
North Carolina	Cabarrus	Concord	46.9	75.5		US 29 south (Concord Parkway) – Charlotte	South end of US 29 overlap
North Carolina	Cabarrus	Concord	49.1	79.0		NC 73 west (Davidson Highway) – Huntersville	West end of NC 73 overlap
North Carolina	Cabarrus	Concord	49.5	79.7		NC 73 east (Davidson Drive)	East end of NC 73 overlap
North Carolina	Cabarrus	Concord	50.5	81.3	58	I-85 south / US 29 north (Cannon Boulevard) – Charlotte, Kannapolis	South end of I-85 and north end of US 29 overlap
North Carolina	Cabarrus	Kannapolis	52.3	84.2	60	Dale Earnhardt Boulevard / Copperfield Boulevard	
North Carolina	Cabarrus	Kannapolis	55.0	88.5	63	Lane Street – Kannapolis	
North Carolina	Rowan	China Grove	60.5	97.4	68	US 29 / NC 152 – China Grove, Rockwell	
North Carolina	Rowan		62.8	101.1	70	Webb Road	
North Carolina	Rowan		64.0	103.0	71	Peeler Road	
North Carolina	Rowan		64.7	104.1	72	Peach Orchard Road	
North Carolina	Rowan	Salisbury	66.1	106.4	74	Julian Road	
North Carolina	Rowan	Salisbury	67.0	107.8	75	I-85 north – Lexington, Greensboro	North end of I-85 overlap
North Carolina	Rowan	Salisbury	68.3	109.9		US 29 / US 70 east (Main Street) – Salisbury, China Grove	East end of US 70 overlap
North Carolina	Rowan	Salisbury	69.0	111.0		NC 150 (Mooresville Road) – Salisbury, Mooresville	
North Carolina	Rowan	Salisbury	71.4	114.9		US 70 west (Statesville Boulevard) – Statesville	West end of US 70 overlap
North Carolina	Rowan	Salisbury	73.2	117.8		To US 52 / Innes Street	To Catawba College
North Carolina	Davie		82.6	132.9		NC 801 – Cooleemee, Advance	
North Carolina	Davie	Mocksville	87.2	140.3		US 64 east (Lexington Road) / US 158 east (Main Street) – Lexington	East end of US 64 overlap
North Carolina	Davie	Mocksville	88.4	142.3		US 64 west (Wilkesboro Street) – Statesville	West end of US 64 overlap
North Carolina	Davie	Mocksville	90.1	145.0		I-40 – Winston-Salem, Statesville	
North Carolina	Davie		97.9	157.6		NC 801 south – Farmington	
North Carolina	Yadkin	Yadkinville	104.8	168.7		US 421 – Winston-Salem, Wilkesboro	
North Carolina	Yadkin	Boonville	113.5	182.7		NC 67 (Main Street) – East Bend, Jonesville	
North Carolina	Surry		120.7	194.2		NC 268 – Pilot Mountain, Elkin	
North Carolina	Surry	Dobson	124.0	199.6		US 601 Bus. north (Main Street) – Dobson	
North Carolina	Surry	Dobson	125.2	201.5		Atkins Street / Turkey Ford Road – Dobson	
North Carolina	Surry		126.7	203.9		US 601 Bus. south (Main Street) – Dobson	
North Carolina	Surry	Mount Airy	131.2	211.1		I-74 – Winston-Salem, Wytheville	
North Carolina	Surry	Mount Airy	133.6	215.0		US 52 (Andy Griffith Parkway) – Winston-Salem, Hillsville	
1.000 mi = 1.609 km; 1.000 km = 0.621 mi: Concurrency terminus; Tolled

== See also ==
- Special routes of U.S. Route 601
