= South Carolina Highway 33 =

State highway in South Carolina, United States

South Carolina Highway 33

Route information
- Maintained by SCDOT
- Length: 19.360 mi (31.157 km)

Major junctions
- South end: US 301 / US 601 / SC 4 in Orangeburg
- US 178 Bus. in Orangeburg; US 21 Bus. / US 601 in Orangeburg; US 21 / US 178 on Wilkinson Heights–Brookdale line; I-26 northeast of Brookdale; US 176 in Cameron
- North end: SC 267 near Lone Star

Location
- Country: United States
- State: South Carolina
- Counties: Orangeburg, Calhoun

Highway system
- South Carolina State Highway System; Interstate; US; State; Scenic
| ← SC 31 | → SC 34 |

South Carolina Highway 33 (SC 33) is a 19.360-mile-long (31.157 km) state highway in the U.S. state of South Carolina. The highway connects Orangeburg with the Lone Star area, via Cameron.

== Route description ==
SC 33 begins at an intersection with US 301/US 601/SC 4 (John C. Calhoun Drive) in Orangeburg within Orangeburg. Here, the highway continues as Andrew Dibble Street. It travels to the northeast and immediately passes Veterans Memorial Park. A few blocks later, it intersects US 178 Bus. (Broughton Street). It cuts through Memorial Park. On the southwestern corner of South Carolina State University is an intersection with US 21 Bus./US 601 (Magnolia Street). The highway travels along the southeastern edge of the university. It begins traveling along the Wilkinson Heights–Brookdale line. The highway then intersects US 21/US 178 (Chestnut Street/Whittaker Parkway). After leaving the city area, SC 33 travels through rural areas of the county, has an interchange with Interstate 26 (I-26), and passes the Bull Swamp Cemetery. Just before entering Cameron, it enters Calhoun County. In town, it intersects US 176 (Old State Road). The highway resumes a rural routing, including an intersection with SC 6, until it meets its northern terminus, an intersection with SC 267, near Lone Star.

== Major intersections ==
| County | Location | mi | km | Destinations | Notes |
|---|---|---|---|---|---|
| Orangeburg | Orangeburg | 0.000 | 0.000 | US 301 / US 601 / SC 4 (John C. Calhoun Drive) – Bamberg | Southern terminus |
| Orangeburg | Orangeburg | 0.590 | 0.950 | US 178 Bus. (Broughton Street) – Bowman | |
| Orangeburg | Orangeburg | 1.290 | 2.076 | US 21 Bus. (Magnolia Street) / US 601 – St. Matthews, Bowman | |
| Orangeburg | | 2.240 | 3.605 | US 21 / US 178 (Chestnut Street/Whittaker Parkway) – North | |
| Orangeburg | | 5.530– 5.540 | 8.900– 8.916 | I-26 – Charleston, Columbia | I-26 exit 149 |
| Calhoun | Cameron | 10.940 | 17.606 | US 176 (Old State Road) – St. Matthews, Holly Hill | |
| Calhoun | | 15.580 | 25.074 | SC 6 (Old Number Six Highway) – St. Matthews, Elloree | |
| Calhoun | | 19.360 | 31.157 | SC 267 (Pearman Dairy Road) – Elloree, Fort Motte | Northern terminus |
1.000 mi = 1.609 km; 1.000 km = 0.621 mi

== History ==
=== South Carolina Highway 69 ===
South Carolina Highway 69
- Location: Orangeburg–Cameron, South Carolina
- Existed: c.1935–1938

South Carolina Highway 69 (SC 69) was a state highway that was established in either 1934 or 1935 on a path from what then was SC 4 in Orangeburg to a point to the east-northeast for about 5 miles (8.0 km). In July 1936, it was extended to SC 31 (now US 176) in Cameron. In 1938, it was decommissioned and redesignated as part of SC 33.
