= South Carolina Highway 333 =

State highway in South Carolina, United States

South Carolina Highway 333
- Scotia–Furman Highway

Route information
- Maintained by SCDOT
- Length: 3.340 mi (5.375 km)
- Existed: 1949–present

Major junctions
- West end: US 321 in Scotia
- East end: US 601 in Furman

Location
- Country: United States
- State: South Carolina
- Counties: Hampton

Highway system
- South Carolina State Highway System; Interstate; US; State; Scenic
← SC 332	→ SC 336

South Carolina Highway 333 (SC 333) is a 3.340-mile (5.375 km) primary state highway in the U.S. state of South Carolina. It serves as a connector highway between the towns of Scotia and Furman.

== Route description ==
SC 333 is a two-lane rural highway that connects U.S. Route 321 (US 321) and US 601. It branches off of US 321 in the town of Scotia, only to terminate about three miles (4.8 km) later at the intersection with US 601 in the town of Furman.

== History ==
Established in 1949 as a resurrection, it follows the first SC 333 established in 1939, running then as is now. The first SC 333 did extend from its routing in 1940 west to Shirley then southeast to Garnett. In 1941 or 1942, it was extended east to end at SC 631, west of Grays; creating a total of over 23 miles (37 km) in length. In 1948, the route was decommissioned. When resurrected, it still left behind Augusta Stage Coach Road (S-25-20), Shirley Road (S-25-25), Stafford Road (S-25-26) and S-25-17.

== Major intersections ==
The entire route is in Hampton County.

Location	mi	km	Destinations	Notes
Scotia	0.000	0.000	US 321 (Columbia Highway) / Daley Road west – Tarboro, Estill	Western terminus; roadway continues as Daley Road.
Furman	3.340	5.375	US 601 (Savannah Highway) / Town Hall Avenue east – Tarboro, Hampton	Eastern terminus; roadway continues as Town Hall Avenue.
1.000 mi = 1.609 km; 1.000 km = 0.621 mi
