= South Carolina Highway 267 =

Highway in South Carolina, USA

South Carolina Highway 267

Route information
- Maintained by SCDOT
- Length: 23.200 mi (37.337 km)

Major junctions
- South end: US 15 near Santee
- US 301 near Santee
- North end: US 601 near Fort Motte

Location
- Country: United States
- State: South Carolina
- Counties: Orangeburg, Calhoun

Highway system
- South Carolina State Highway System; Interstate; US; State; Scenic
← SC 265	→ SC 268

South Carolina Highway 267 (SC 267) is a 23.200-mile-long (37.337 km) state highway in the U.S. state of South Carolina. The highway connects the Santee area with rural areas of Orangeburg and Calhoun counties, via Elloree.

== Route description ==
SC 267 begins at an intersection with U.S. Route 15 (US 15; Bass Drive) south-southwest of Santee, within Orangeburg County. It travels to the north-northwest and crosses over Providence Swamp before intersecting US 301 (Five Chop Road). The highway curves to the north and crosses railroad tracks and intersects SC 6 (Old Number Six Highway) southeast of Elloree. The highways travel concurrently to the northwest into Elloree. There, they intersect the northern terminus of SC 47 (West Cleveland Street). Just before leaving town, they pass Joe Miller Park. Approximately 2,000 feet (610 m) later, they split, with SC 267 heading to the north-northeast. The highway enters Calhoun County just before Peachtree Road. Then, SC 267 curves to the north-northwest. It crosses over Halfway Swamp Creek. It crosses some railroad tracks and passes by, but does not enter, Lone Star. It intersects the northern terminus of SC 33 (Cameron Road) northwest of Lone Star. The highway curves to the north and curves back to the northwest and crosses Warley Creek. It intersects SC 419 (Fort Motte Road). SC 267 crosses Squirrel Creek before meeting its northern terminus, an intersection with US 601 (Colonel Thomson Highway) southeast of Fort Motte, where the roadway continues as Adams Road.

== Major intersections ==
County	Location	mi	km	Destinations	Notes
Orangeburg		0.000	0.000	US 15 (Bass Drive) – Santee	Southern terminus
Orangeburg		1.710	2.752	US 301 (Five Chop Road) – Orangeburg, Santee	
Orangeburg		5.480	8.819	SC 6 east (Old Number Six Highway) – Santee	Southern end of SC 6 concurrency
Orangeburg	Elloree	7.480	12.038	SC 47 south – Orangeburg	Northern terminus of SC 47
Orangeburg		8.750	14.082	SC 6 west – St. Matthews	Northern end of SC 6 concurrency
Calhoun		15.840	25.492	SC 33 south (Cameron Road) – Cameron, Orangeburg	Northern terminus of SC 33
Calhoun		18.910	30.433	SC 419 north (Fort Motte Road) – Ft. Motte	Southern terminus of SC 419
Calhoun		23.200	37.337	US 601 (Colonel Thomson Highway) – St. Matthews, Columbia	Northern terminus
1.000 mi = 1.609 km; 1.000 km = 0.621 mi: Concurrency terminus
