= North Carolina's 67th House district =

American legislative district

North Carolina's 67th State House of Representatives district
Representative
Cody Huneycutt; R–Oakboro
- Demographics: 74% White; 13% Black; 9% Hispanic; 2% Asian; 3% Multiracial
- Population (2024): 90,658

North Carolina's 67th House district is one of 120 districts in the North Carolina House of Representatives. It has been represented by Republican Cody Huneycutt since 2025.

== Geography ==
Since 2023, the district has included all of Stanly and Montgomery counties. The district overlaps with the 29th and 33rd Senate districts.

== District officeholders ==
Representative	Party	Dates	Notes	Counties
District created January 1, 1985.
C. B. Hauser (Winston-Salem)	Democratic	January 1, 1985 – January 1, 1987	Redistricted from the 39th district.	1985–2003; Part of Forsyth County.
Logan Burke (Winston-Salem)	Democratic	January 1, 1987 – January 1, 1991		1985–2003; Part of Forsyth County.
Warren Oldham (Winston-Salem)	Democratic	January 1, 1991 – January 1, 2003	Redistricted to the 72nd district and retired.	1985–2003; Part of Forsyth County.
Arlie Culp (Ramseur)	Republican	January 1, 2003 – January 1, 2005	Redistricted from the 30th district. Redistricted to the 70th district.	2003–2005; Part of Randolph County.
David Almond (Stanfield)	Republican	January 1, 2005 – July 12, 2007	Resigned.	2005–2013; All of Stanly County. Parts of Montgomery and Union counties.
Vacant		July 12, 2007 – September 10, 2007		2005–2013; All of Stanly County. Parts of Montgomery and Union counties.
Kenny Furr (Albemarle)	Republican	September 10, 2007 – January 1, 2009	Appointed to finish Almond's term. Lost re-nomination.	2005–2013; All of Stanly County. Parts of Montgomery and Union counties.
Justin Burr (Albemarle)	Republican	January 1, 2009 – January 1, 2019	Lost re-nomination.	2005–2013; All of Stanly County. Parts of Montgomery and Union counties.
Justin Burr (Albemarle)	Republican	January 1, 2009 – January 1, 2019	Lost re-nomination.	2013–2019; All of Stanly County. Part of Montgomery County.
Wayne Sasser (Albemarle)	Republican	January 1, 2019 – January 1, 2025	Retired.	2019–2021; Parts of Stanly and Cabarrus counties.
Wayne Sasser (Albemarle)	Republican	January 1, 2019 – January 1, 2025	Retired.	2021–2023; Parts of Stanly, Cabarrus, and Rowan counties.
Wayne Sasser (Albemarle)	Republican	January 1, 2019 – January 1, 2025	Retired.	2023–Present; All of Stanly and Montgomery counties.
Cody Huneycutt (Oakboro)	Republican	January 1, 2025 – Present		2023–Present; All of Stanly and Montgomery counties.

== Election results ==
=== 2026 ===
North Carolina House of Representatives 67th district Democratic primary election, 2026
Party	Candidate	Votes	%
Democratic	Jocelyn Torres	1,880	66.48%
Democratic	Roddrick Howell	948	33.52%
Total votes		2,828	100%

North Carolina House of Representatives 67th district general election, 2026
Party	Candidate	Votes	%
Republican	Cody Huneycutt (incumbent)		
Democratic	Jocelyn Torres		
Total votes			100%

=== 2024 ===
North Carolina House of Representatives 67th district Republican primary election, 2024
Party	Candidate	Votes	%
Republican	Cody Huneycutt	9,140	64.74%
Republican	Brandon King	4,978	35.26%
Total votes		14,118	100%

North Carolina House of Representatives 67th district general election, 2024
Party	Candidate	Votes	%
Republican	Cody Huneycutt	36,358	75.03%
Democratic	Daniel Quick	12,099	24.97%
Total votes		48,457	100%
Republican hold			

=== 2022 ===
North Carolina House of Representatives 67th district general election, 2022
Party	Candidate	Votes	%
Republican	Wayne Sasser (incumbent)	26,654	100%
Total votes		26,654	100%
Republican hold			

=== 2020 ===
North Carolina House of Representatives 67th district general election, 2020
Party	Candidate	Votes	%
Republican	Wayne Sasser (incumbent)	41,210	100%
Total votes		41,210	100%
Republican hold			

=== 2018 ===
North Carolina House of Representatives 67th district Republican Primary election, 2018
Party	Candidate	Votes	%
Republican	Wayne Sasser	4,950	56.10%
Republican	Justin Burr (incumbent)	3,874	43.90%
Total votes		8,824	100%

North Carolina House of Representatives 67th district general election, 2018
Party	Candidate	Votes	%
Republican	Wayne Sasser	24,040	72.42%
Democratic	Karen Webster	8,006	24.12%
Libertarian	Michael Finn	1,150	3.46%
Total votes		33,196	100%
Republican hold			

=== 2016 ===
North Carolina House of Representatives 67th district Republican primary election, 2016
Party	Candidate	Votes	%
Republican	Justin Burr (incumbent)	6,409	51.01%
Republican	Lane O. Burris	6,154	48.99%
Total votes		12,563	100%

North Carolina House of Representatives 67th district general election, 2016
Party	Candidate	Votes	%
Republican	Justin Burr (incumbent)	20,421	53.25%
Democratic	Carson Roger Snyder	10,637	27.74%
Independent	Billy Mills	7,288	19.01%
Total votes		38,346	100%
Republican hold			

=== 2014 ===
North Carolina House of Representatives 67th district Republican primary election, 2014
Party	Candidate	Votes	%
Republican	Justin Burr (incumbent)	4,311	62.48%
Republican	Peter Asciutto	2,589	37.52%
Total votes		6,900	100%

North Carolina House of Representatives 67th district general election, 2014
Party	Candidate	Votes	%
Republican	Justin Burr (incumbent)	15,094	59.28%
Democratic	Nalin Mehta	10,367	40.72%
Total votes		25,461	100%
Republican hold			

=== 2012 ===
North Carolina House of Representatives 67th district Democratic primary election, 2012
Party	Candidate	Votes	%
Democratic	Kevin Furr	3,833	59.36%
Democratic	Gail Williams	2,624	40.64%
Total votes		6,457	100%

North Carolina House of Representatives 67th district Republican primary election, 2012
Party	Candidate	Votes	%
Republican	Justin Burr (incumbent)	7,518	66.34%
Republican	Darrell E. Almond	3,815	33.66%
Total votes		11,333	100%

North Carolina House of Representatives 67th district general election, 2012
Party	Candidate	Votes	%
Republican	Justin Burr (incumbent)	22,911	62.58%
Democratic	Kevin Furr	13,700	37.42%
Total votes		36,611	100%
Republican hold			

=== 2010 ===
North Carolina House of Representatives 67th district general election, 2010
Party	Candidate	Votes	%
Republican	Justin Burr (incumbent)	17,135	75.41%
Democratic	Kevin Furr	5,587	24.59%
Total votes		22,722	100%
Republican hold			

=== 2008 ===
North Carolina House of Representatives 67th district Republican primary election, 2008
Party	Candidate	Votes	%
Republican	Justin Burr	2,344	37.49%
Republican	Kenny Furr (incumbent)	2,055	32.86%
Republican	Nalin C. Mehta	1,854	29.65%
Total votes		6,253	100%

North Carolina House of Representatives 67th district Republican primary run-off election, 2008
Party	Candidate	Votes	%
Republican	Justin Burr	1,383	58.31%
Republican	Kenny Furr (incumbent)	989	41.69%
Total votes		2,372	100%

North Carolina House of Representatives 67th district general election, 2008
Party	Candidate	Votes	%
Republican	Justin Burr	26,174	100%
Total votes		26,174	100%
Republican hold			

=== 2006 ===
North Carolina House of Representatives 67th district Republican primary election, 2006
Party	Candidate	Votes	%
Republican	David Almond (incumbent)	2,348	68.68%
Republican	Justin Burr	1,071	31.32%
Total votes		3,419	100%

North Carolina House of Representatives 67th district general election, 2006
Party	Candidate	Votes	%
Republican	David Almond (incumbent)	13,788	100%
Total votes		13,788	100%
Republican hold			

=== 2004 ===
North Carolina House of Representatives 67th district Republican primary election, 2004
Party	Candidate	Votes	%
Republican	David Almond	1,686	39.83%
Republican	Bobby Barbee Sr. (incumbent)	1,603	37.87%
Republican	Kenny Furr	457	10.80%
Republican	Lester F. Galloway	284	6.71%
Republican	W. P. "Bill" Davis	203	4.80%
Total votes		4,233	100%

North Carolina House of Representatives 67th district Republican primary run-off election, 2004
Party	Candidate	Votes	%
Republican	David Almond	2,322	64.97%
Republican	Bobby Barbee Sr. (incumbent)	1,252	35.03%
Total votes		3,574	100%

North Carolina House of Representatives 67th district general election, 2004
Party	Candidate	Votes	%
Republican	David Almond	19,974	65.91%
Democratic	June Mabry	10,332	34.09%
Total votes		30,306	100%
Republican hold			

=== 2002 ===
North Carolina House of Representatives 67th district general election, 2002
Party	Candidate	Votes	%
Republican	Arlie Culp (incumbent)	10,481	68.13%
Democratic	Mary Tate Blake	4,902	31.87%
Total votes		15,383	100%
Republican hold			

=== 2000 ===
North Carolina House of Representatives 67th district Democratic primary election, 2000
Party	Candidate	Votes	%
Democratic	Warren Oldham (incumbent)	2,274	63.86%
Democratic	Carlton N. Pressley	1,287	36.14%
Total votes		3,561	100%

North Carolina House of Representatives 67th district general election, 2000
Party	Candidate	Votes	%
Democratic	Warren Oldham (incumbent)	13,807	100%
Total votes		13,807	100%
Democratic hold			
