= Justin Burr =

American politician

Justin P. Burr
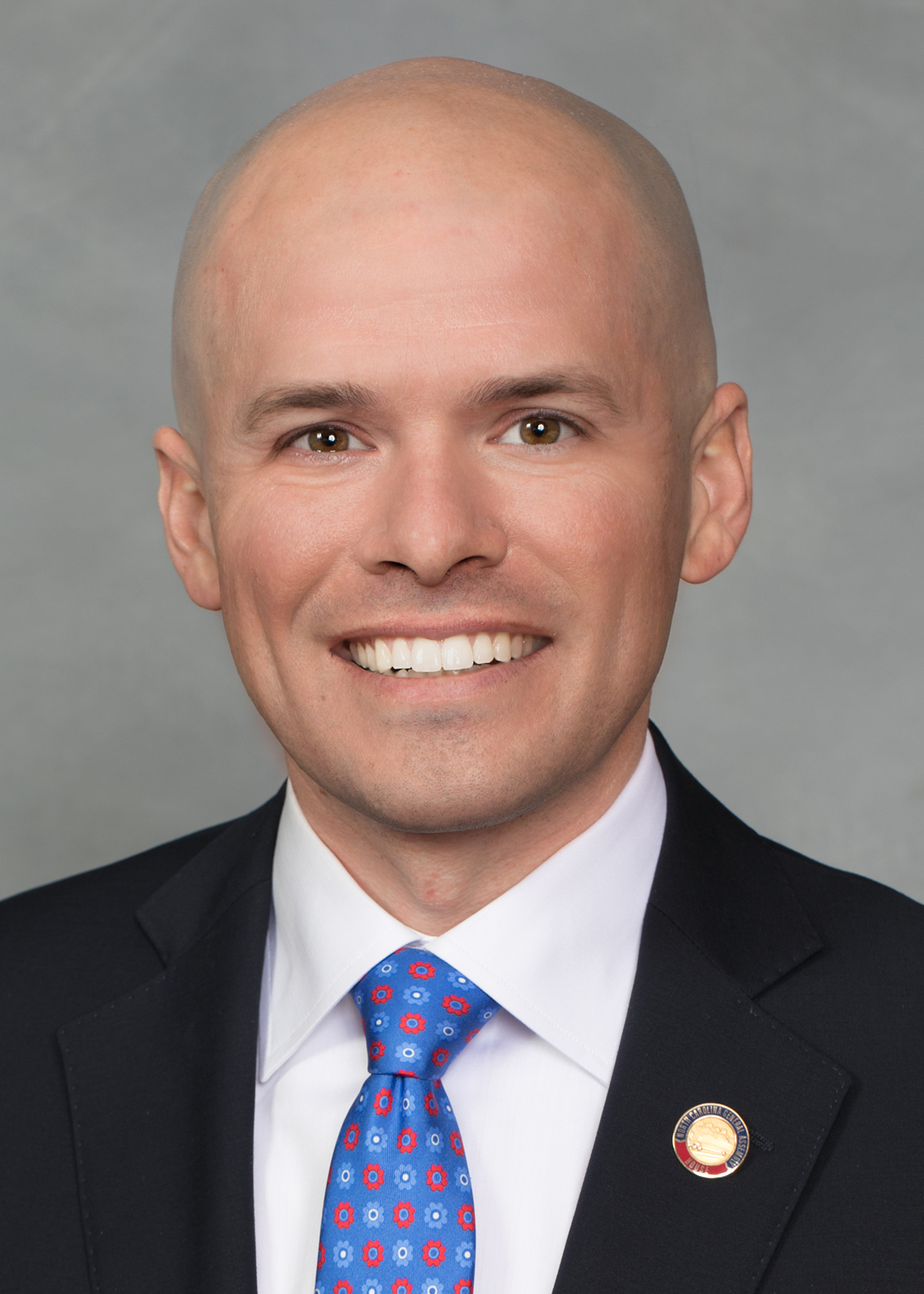

Member of the North Carolina House of Representatives from the 67th district
- In office January 1, 2009 – January 1, 2019
- Preceded by: Kenny Furr
- Succeeded by: Wayne Sasser

Personal details
- Born: June 28, 1985 (age 41) Wadesboro, North Carolina, U.S.
- Party: Republican
- Occupation: Bail Bondsman
- Website: www.justinburr.com

Justin P. Burr is a former representative from the 67th District in the North Carolina House of Representatives. The 67th District includes all of Stanly County and a majority of Montgomery County. Burr, a Republican, resides in Norwood, North Carolina.

== Personal life ==
Justin Burr was born on June 28, 1985, in Wadesboro, North Carolina. His father is Phil Burr of Burr Bail Bonds. In 2002, Burr interned for United States Senator Jesse Helms. In 2004, he interned for United States Senator Elizabeth Dole.

In 2002, Burr was the Stanly County Coordinator for the Elizabeth Dole for United States Senate campaign. In 2007–2008, he was the Stanly County Chair for the Hayes for Congress campaign.

Burr is a member of the National Rifle Association, the District Council of the Boy Scouts of America, and the Stanly County Chamber of Commerce. He is also a member of the National, State and Regional Associations of REALTORS and the North Carolina Bail Agents Association. Burr is an Eagle Scout and attends West Albemarle Baptist Church.

Burr briefly attended Stanly Community College and Campbell University but did not receive a degree.

== Business career ==
Burr is a third generation bail enforcement agent with his family's business, Burr Bail Bonds.

He is also a licensed real estate broker and owner of Burr Realty, Inc.

== North Carolina House of Representatives ==
Burr was elected to his first term in 2008, and was re-elected in 2010 and 2012. In the 2008 Republican primary runoff, Burr, then 22 years old, beat opponent Kenny Furr, with 58 percent of the vote. At the age of 23 years, Burr became the youngest member of the North Carolina General Assembly. During his first term, Burr served as the House Republican Freshman Leader.

Burr won his second election with 75% of the vote. Burr was appointed to serve as a chair of the House Appropriations Subcommittee on Health & Human Services. He also was appointed to serve as the Vice-Chair of the Election Committee, Health & Human Services Committee, the Health & Human Services Subcommittee on Mental Health, Judiciary Committee and the Redistricting Committee.

Burr previously served as vice-chair of the House Appropriations Committee, chair of the Appropriations Subcommittee on Capital, chair of the Health Committee, and chair of the Judiciary IV Committee. He also serves on the Appropriations Subcommittee on Health & Human Services, Elections and Ethics Law Committee, State & Local Government I Committee, and the Rules, Calendar, and Operations of the House Committee.

Due to his efforts in the legislature to improve mental health, intellectual/developmental disabilities and substance abuse (MH/IDD/SA) services, on July 16, 2014, Burr received the NC Council of Community Programs 2014 State Representative Leadership Award.

Burr has been criticized for interfering with local government in Stanly County by passing a bill to make the Stanly County School Board elections partisan, adding an amendment to the 2015–2016 budget forbidding Stanly Community College from opening a culinary school in downtown Albemarle, and interfering with the town of Norwood's plans to construct a new fire department. Although Burr lost his home county of Stanly, he defeated Republican Lane O. Burris in the 2016 Republican primary by a thin margin of 242 votes, and will go on to face Democrat Carson Roger Snyder on November 8. On March 24, Burris endorsed Snyder. In the May 8, 2018 primaries, Burr lost his primary to challenger Wayne Sasser.

=== Political positions ===
==== Abortion ====
Burr has been described as a champion of the anti-abortion movement. He is against women having abortions, and believes they should be illegal. In 2015, he co-sponsored, voted for, and helped successfully pass legislation in North Carolina that imposes additional restrictions on a woman's constitutional right to abortion. The new requirements were fully implemented by January 2016, and included:

- 72-hour waiting period after the first appointment before a woman can have an abortion
- A physician must report any abortion or miscarriage after the 16th week of pregnancy to the Department of Health and Human Services, along with the gestational age of the fetus, the measurements of the fetus, and a copy of an ultrasound image.
- A physician must report any abortion or miscarriage after the 20th week of pregnancy, and the report must include documentation demonstrating that the procedure was a medical emergency
- Physicians must be certified in obstetrics or gynecology and possess "sufficient training" in abortion care
- Amended the definition of "statutory rape" to include intercourse or a sexual act with an individual who is 15 years old or younger
- Authorized child support payments to be made by electronic transmission
- Established a "Maternal Mortality Committee" to review maternal deaths and develop recommendations for the prevention of future maternal deaths.

==== Child Fatality Task Force ====
Burr has voted to get rid of the Child Fatality Task force, stating he believes that local task forces would be able to continue investigating child deaths.

==== Environment ====
In 2014, Burr was given a 0% rating by Environment North Carolina. Burr has voted to repeal a recycling program and to repeal motor vehicle emissions inspections.

==== Guns ====
Burr would like to expand the "right to carry" law in North Carolina. Burr has been endorsed by the National Rifle Association.

==== LGBT rights ====
Burr has voted to ban gay marriage in North Carolina. He has voted to allow officials to refuse marriage based on religious objections. He has voted yes on legislation requiring people to use a bathroom that corresponds with their gender assigned at birth.

==== Penalty on protesters ====
In 2017, Burr voted to increase punishments for protesters who block roads or damage property. The bill included a requirement for local law enforcement to be given "directions to clear the roads" immediately whenever a gathering of greater than 10 people blocks traffic, as opposed to waiting for protesters to disperse peacefully before using force. This bill was in response to nationwide protests. The bill has been criticized for "allowing drivers to legally run over protesters who block roads."

==== Unions ====
Burr has supported anti-union legislation that would add the state's current "Right to Work" law to the constitution. Burr has stated, "We do not want, I do not want to see employees, potential employees, have to give up a job because they're forced to contribute or join." At the time, forced unionization was already illegal in North Carolina. The legislation did not further protect against unionization, but made it more difficult to repeal the "right to work" law in the future.

=== 2018 ===
North Carolina House of Representatives 67th district Republican Primary election, 2018
Party	Candidate	Votes	%
Republican	Wayne Sasser	4,950	56.10%
Republican	Justin Burr (incumbent)	3,874	43.90%
Total votes		8,824	100%

=== 2016 ===
North Carolina House of Representatives 67th district Republican primary election, 2016
Party	Candidate	Votes	%
Republican	Justin Burr (incumbent)	6,409	51.01%
Republican	Lane O. Burris	6,154	48.99%
Total votes		12,563	100%

North Carolina House of Representatives 67th district general election, 2016
Party	Candidate	Votes	%
Republican	Justin Burr (incumbent)	20,421	53.25%
Democratic	Carson Roger Snyder	10,637	27.74%
Unaffiliated	Billy Mills	7,288	19.01%
Total votes		38,346	100%
Republican hold			

=== 2014 ===
North Carolina House of Representatives 67th district Republican primary election, 2014
Party	Candidate	Votes	%
Republican	Justin Burr (incumbent)	4,311	62.48%
Republican	Peter Asciutto	2,589	37.52%
Total votes		6,900	100%

North Carolina House of Representatives 67th district general election, 2014
Party	Candidate	Votes	%
Republican	Justin Burr (incumbent)	15,094	59.28%
Democratic	Nalin Mehta	10,367	40.72%
Total votes		25,461	100%
Republican hold			

=== 2012 ===
North Carolina House of Representatives 67th district Republican primary election, 2012
Party	Candidate	Votes	%
Republican	Justin Burr (incumbent)	7,518	66.34%
Republican	Darrell E. Almond	3,815	33.66%
Total votes		11,333	100%

North Carolina House of Representatives 67th district general election, 2012
Party	Candidate	Votes	%
Republican	Justin Burr (incumbent)	22,911	62.58%
Democratic	Kevin Furr	13,700	37.42%
Total votes		36,611	100%
Republican hold			

=== 2010 ===
North Carolina House of Representatives 67th district general election, 2010
Party	Candidate	Votes	%
Republican	Justin Burr (incumbent)	17,135	75.41%
Democratic	Kevin Furr	5,587	24.59%
Total votes		22,722	100%
Republican hold			

=== 2008 ===
North Carolina House of Representatives 67th district Republican primary election, 2008
Party	Candidate	Votes	%
Republican	Justin Burr	2,344	37.49%
Republican	Kenny Furr (incumbent)	2,055	32.86%
Republican	Nalin C. Mehta	1,854	29.65%
Total votes		6,253	100%

North Carolina House of Representatives 67th district Republican primary run-off election, 2008
Party	Candidate	Votes	%
Republican	Justin Burr	1,383	58.31%
Republican	Kenny Furr (incumbent)	989	41.69%
Total votes		2,372	100%

North Carolina House of Representatives 67th district general election, 2008
Party	Candidate	Votes	%
Republican	Justin Burr	26,174	100%
Total votes		26,174	100%
Republican hold			

=== 2006 ===
North Carolina House of Representatives 67th district Republican primary election, 2006
Party	Candidate	Votes	%
Republican	David Almond (incumbent)	2,348	68.68%
Republican	Justin Burr	1,071	31.32%
Total votes		3,419	100%

== Honors ==
As a teenager, Burr was named the 2003 "Outstanding Teen Age Republican in the Nation" award, by the National Teen Age Republicans. Five years later, as an adviser to the North Carolina Teen Age Republicans, Burr won the "Lillie Murdock Award" at the National Teen Age Republicans conference. He still serves as the adviser to the North Carolina Teen Age Republicans.

In 2013, Burr was selected as a 2013 GOPAC Emerging Leader. He was one of twenty Republicans in the nation to attend the Emerging Leaders Summit.

Burr has been honored as a "Defender of Liberty" by the American Conservative Union for three years straight, in 2011, 2012 and 2013.

In 2014, Burr was endorsed by the National Federation of Independent Business and the State Employees Association of North Carolina.

In 2018, Burr was listed as a Champion of the Family in the NC Values Coalition scorecard.

North Carolina House of Representatives
Preceded by Kenny Furr	Member of the North Carolina House of Representatives from the 67th district 2009-2019	Succeeded by Wayne Sasser
