= Wayne Sasser =

American politician

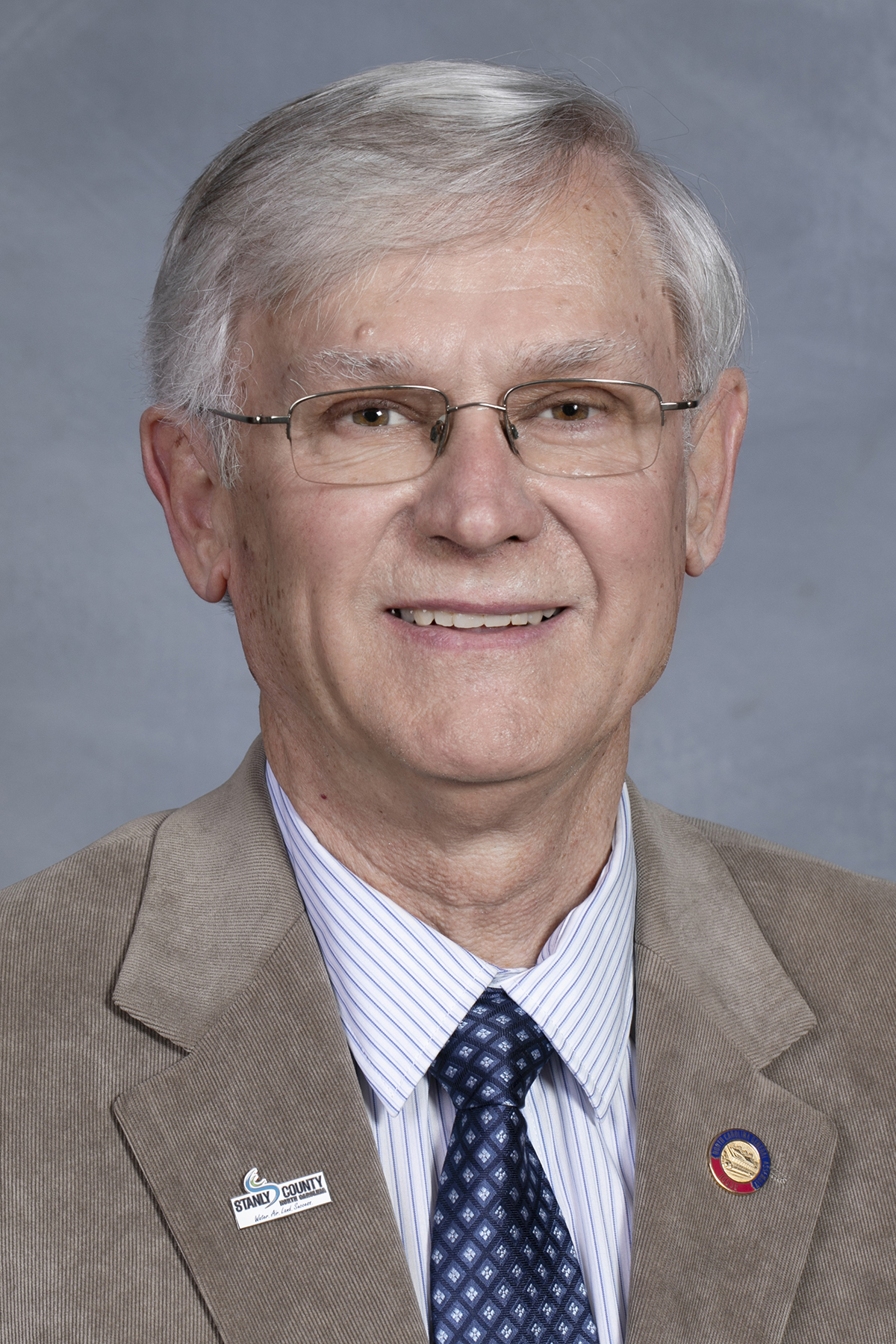

Member of the North Carolina House of Representatives from the 67th district
- In office January 1, 2019 – January 1, 2025
- Preceded by: Justin Burr
- Succeeded by: Cody Huneycutt

Personal details
- Born: Clayton Wayne Sasser; February 1, 1950 (age 76) Stanfield, North Carolina, U.S.
- Party: Republican
- Spouse: Nancy
- Children: 2
- Education: UNC Eshelman School of Pharmacy
- Occupation: pharmacist
- Website: Official website

Clayton Wayne Sasser (born February 1, 1950) is an American politician who is a Republican former member of the North Carolina House of Representatives, who represented the 67th district (including all of Stanly County and parts of Cabarrus County), from 2019 to 2025. He defeated incumbent representative Justin Burr in the Republican primary, and was later elected to the seat.

== Committee assignments ==
=== 2023–2024 Session ===
- Appropriations (Chair)
- Appropriations - Health and Human Services (Vice Chair)
- Health (Chair)
- Insurance (Vice Chair)
- Local Government
- Agriculture
- Families, Children, and Aging Policy

=== 2021–2022 Session ===
- Appropriations (Vice Chair)
- Appropriations - Health and Human Services (Chair)
- Health (Chair)
- Insurance (Vice Chair)
- Local Government
- Agriculture
- Families, Children, and Aging Policy

=== 2019–2020 Session ===
- Health
- Insurance
- State and Local Government
- Finance
- Wildlife Resources

== Electoral history ==
=== 2022 ===
North Carolina House of Representatives 67th district general election, 2022
Party	Candidate	Votes	%
Republican	Wayne Sasser (incumbent)	26,654	100%
Total votes		26,654	100%
Republican hold			

=== 2020 ===
North Carolina House of Representatives 67th district general election, 2020
Party	Candidate	Votes	%
Republican	Wayne Sasser (incumbent)	41,210	100%
Total votes		41,210	100%
Republican hold			

=== 2018 ===
North Carolina House of Representatives 67th district Republican Primary election, 2018
Party	Candidate	Votes	%
Republican	Wayne Sasser	4,950	56.10%
Republican	Justin Burr (incumbent)	3,874	43.90%
Total votes		8,824	100%

North Carolina House of Representatives 67th district general election, 2018
Party	Candidate	Votes	%
Republican	Wayne Sasser	24,040	72.42%
Democratic	Karen Webster	8,006	24.12%
Libertarian	Michael Finn	1,150	3.46%
Total votes		33,196	100%
Republican hold			

North Carolina House of Representatives
Preceded by Justin Burr	Member of the North Carolina House of Representatives from the 67th district 2019–2025	Succeeded by Cody Huneycutt
