= Trinity Lutheran Church (Elloree, South Carolina) =

Historic church in South Carolina, United States

- U.S. National Register of Historic Places
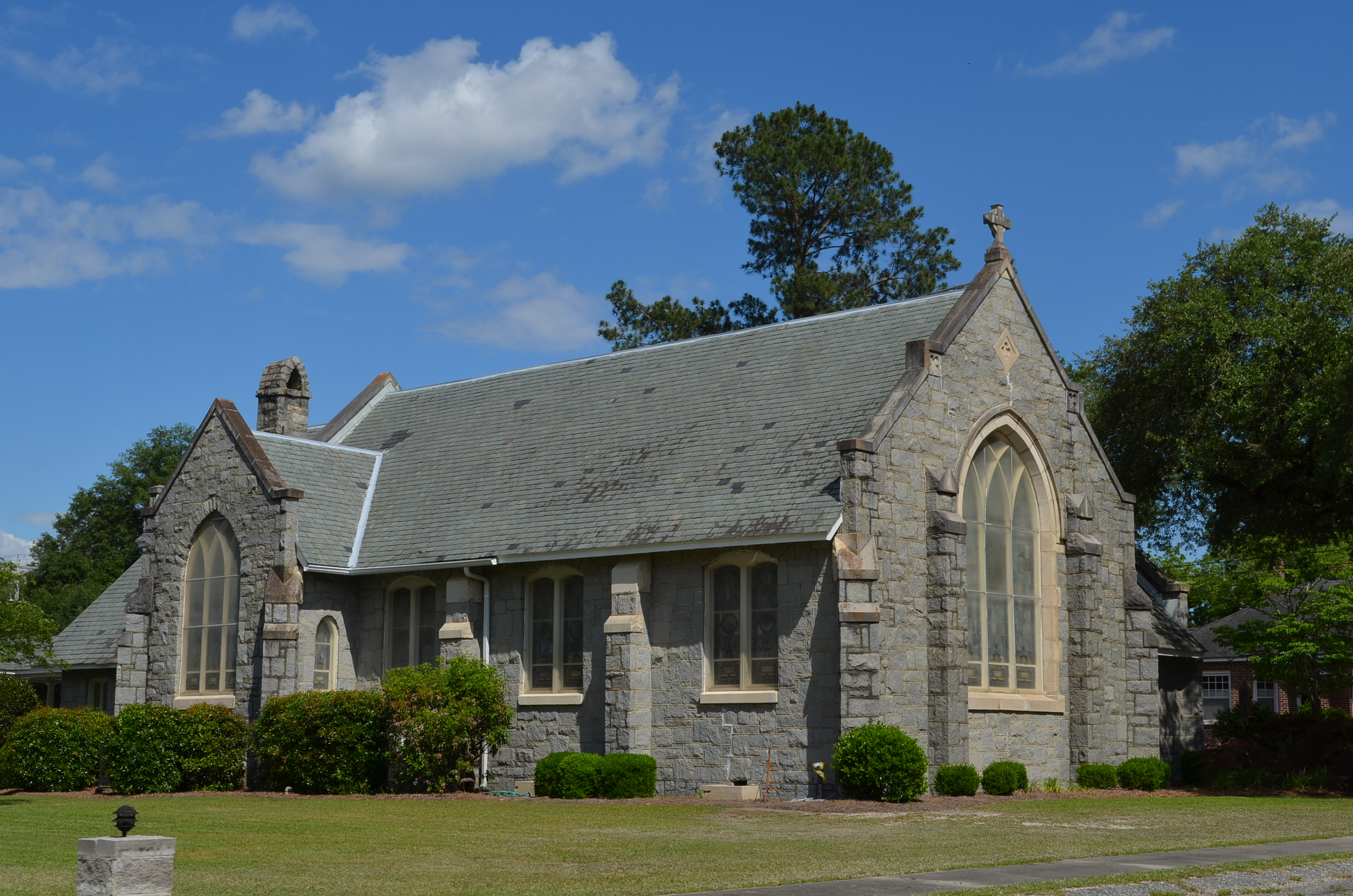
- Trinity Lutheran Church in May 2016

- Location within South Carolina Location within the United States
- Location: 390 Hampton St., Elloree, South Carolina
- Coordinates: 33°31′59″N 80°34′17″W
- Area: 1.7 acres (0.69 ha)
- Built: 1914
- Architect: Johnson, J. Carroll; Summersett, W.B.
- Architectural style: Late Gothic Revival
- NRHP reference No.: 08000721
- Added to NRHP: August 01, 2008

Trinity Lutheran Church is a historic Lutheran church located at 390 Hampton Street in Elloree, Orangeburg County, South Carolina. It was built in 1914, and is a one-story, granite Late Gothic Revival style cruciform plan church building. The building replaced a wood-frame church built in 1889 that was destroyed by fire in 1913 after being struck by lightning. It features 16 granite and limestone buttresses and distinctive custom limestone arched door and window surrounds.

It was added to the National Register of Historic Places in 2008.
