= Ulmer-Summers House =

Historic house in South Carolina, United States

- U.S. National Register of Historic Places
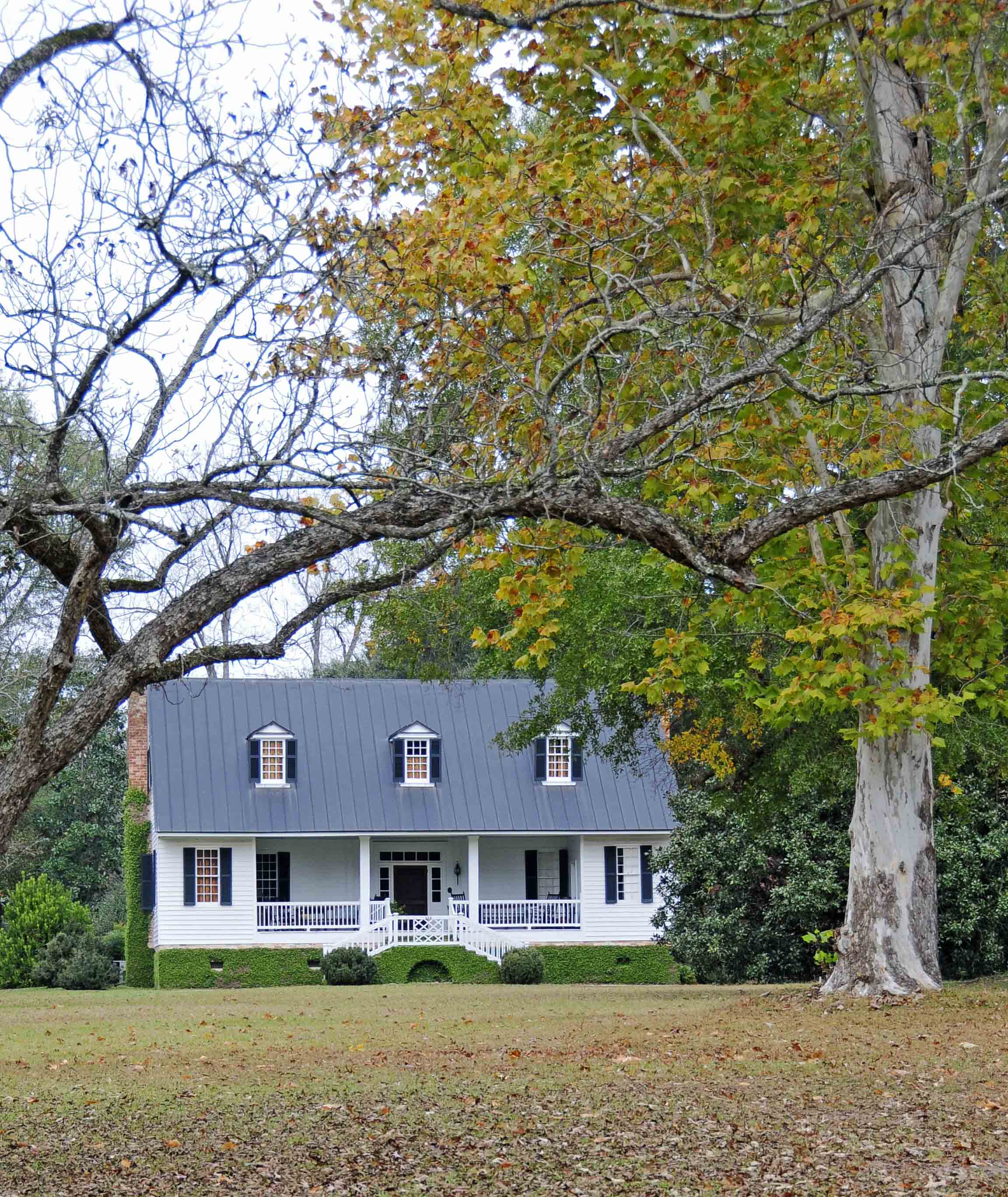
- Ulmer-Summers House, November 2012

- Location within South Carolina Location within the United States
- Location: Old Orangeburg Rd. (SC 31), Cameron, South Carolina
- Coordinates: 33°33′44″N 80°42′55″W
- Area: 5 acres (2.0 ha)
- NRHP reference No.: 73001679
- Added to NRHP: October 25, 1973

Ulmer-Summers House is a historic home located near Cameron, Calhoun County, South Carolina, United States. The original section was built in the late-18th century and was constructed on land originally granted to John Jacob Ulmer in 1757. It is a clapboard frame structure on a low brick foundation and medium-gable roof and an in antis front porch. The house was remodeled in 1960. For a period in excess of 200 years, the Ulmer and Summers families cultivated the land surrounding their house, raising indigo, cotton, grain, and pecans.

It was listed in the National Register of Historic Places in 1973.
