= Cody Huneycutt =

North Carolina politician

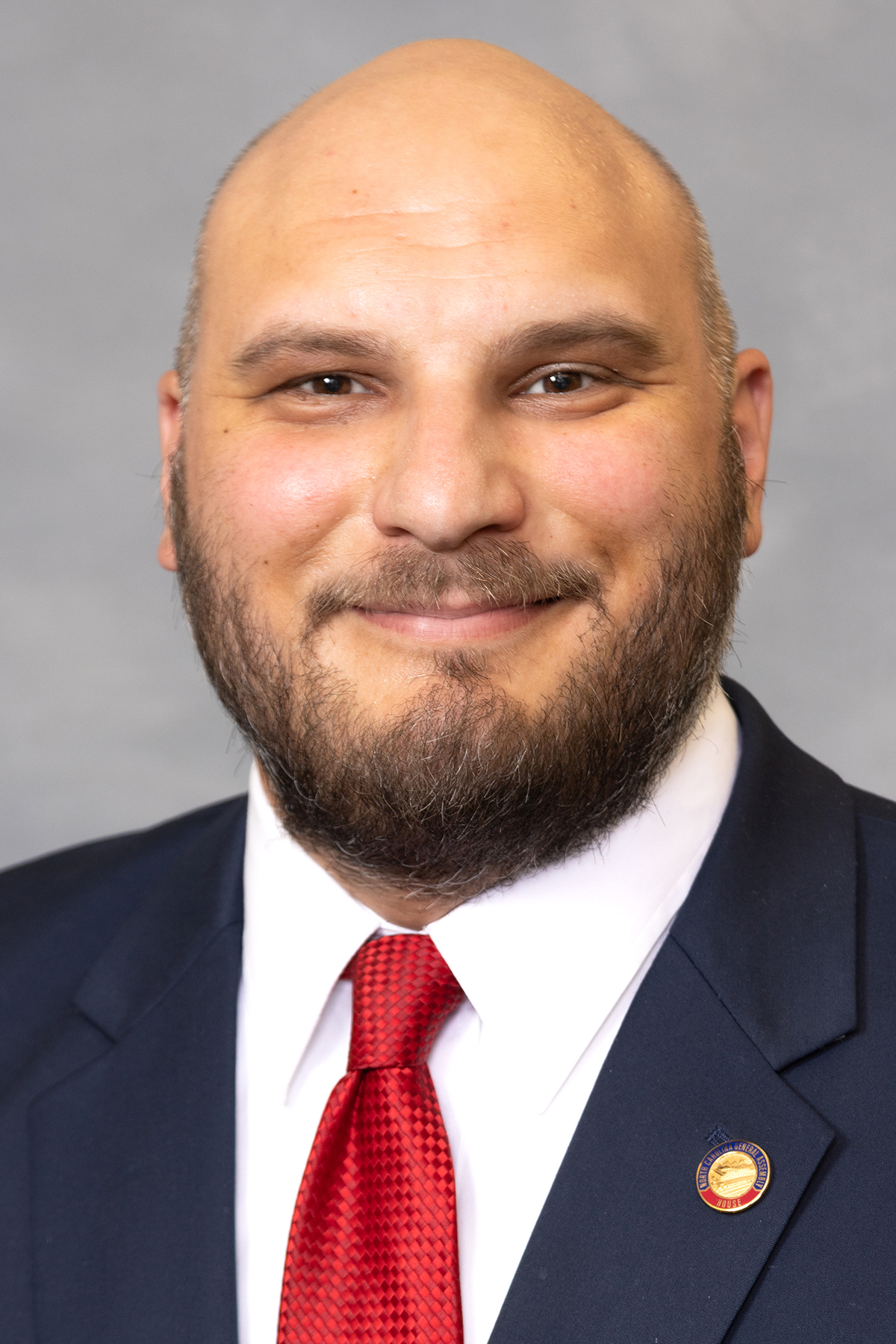

Member of the North Carolina House of Representatives from the 67th district
- Preceded by: Wayne Sasser

Personal details
- Education: Stanly Community College and University of North Carolina at Charlotte
- Website: cody4nc.com

Cody Huneycutt is an American politician who is currently serving as a Republican member of the North Carolina House of Representatives, representing the 67th district. He was first elected in 2024, succeeding retiring incumbent Wayne Sasser.

== Personal life and career ==
Huneycutt lives in Stanly County. He earned an Association of Arts degree from Stanly Community College and later graduated from the University of North Carolina at Charlotte. He previously worked as a staffer for Wayne Sasser, who was the incumbent for the same seat Huneycutt now represents.

== Political positions ==
=== Drug costs ===
Huneycutt mentioned in an interview that he supported H.B. 163, believing it would lower drugs for North Carolinians.

=== Term limits ===
Huneycutt signed the U.S. Term Limits pledge in 2023, which supports term limits for Congressional members.

=== Welfare ===
Huneycutt sponsored H.B. 859, which would ban cities and counties from implementing "guaranteed income programs" for people who are unemployed without the approval of the General Assembly.
