= Lena, South Carolina =

- Unincorporated community
- Location within South Carolina Location within the United States
- Coordinates: 32°45′13″N 81°12′54″W
- Country: United States
- State: South Carolina
- County: Hampton
- Elevation: 108 ft (33 m)
- Time zone: UTC-5 (Eastern (EST))
  - Summer (DST): UTC-4 (EDT)
- ZIP codes (Estill): 29918, 29939
- Area codes: 803, 839
- FIPS code: 45-40975
- GNIS feature ID: 1246334

Lena (also called Willingham) is an unincorporated community in Hampton County, South Carolina, United States, just east of Estill.

== Geography ==
Lena is located at latitude 32.7535025ºN and longitude 81.2151029ºW, at an altitude of 108 feet (33 m).

== Early history ==
Lena's history has largely been intertwined with the Southern Railroad (today's Norfolk Southern).

From 1899 until the 1980s, Southern operated a line through Lena and nearby Allendale, Tarboro, and Furman. Called the "Southern Columbia to Savannah Route", the rail also ran through Barnwell and Blackville to the North. Its primary purpose for Southern was to increase north–south passenger/freight traffic by feeding into ACL (Atlantic Coast Line) at Hardeeville for passage south to Florida or north to Charleston and other points. The rail line was built to compete with another north–south rail line operated nearby by Seaboard Air Line (also called the Florida Central & Peninsular, later Seaboard Coast Line, and presently CSX) which ran a different course through Denmark, Fairfax, Estill, Garnett (parallel to U.S. Route 321) and then into Georgia. Between 1963 and 1970, Southern abandoned its tracks between Furman and Hardeeville leaving Furman as the ending station from Columbia. Finally, in the early 1980s, Southern abandoned its tracks south of Blackville, ending rail service to Barnwell, Allendale, Lena, and Furman. However, by the 1970s, any rail service to Furman (through Lena) would have been a rare event.

Nearby Estill was founded at about the same time as Lena. Estill (originally named “Lawtonville,” was renamed for the president of the Seaboard Air Line Railroad which laid tracks through what is now Estill at about the same time Southern was laying tracks through what is today's Lena.

Lena was named for Allene Thomson Lawton, whose father, Thomas Oregon Lawton, owned land that Southern workers camped on. Since the name Allene was too similar to the nearby established town of Allendale, the nickname “Lena,” which her father called her, was selected as the name of Southern's station in what is now Lena.
