= Scotia, South Carolina =

- Town
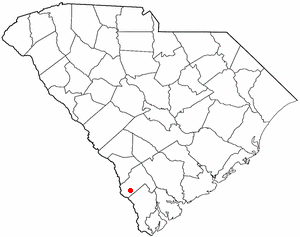
- Location of Scotia, South Carolina
- Coordinates: 32°40′49″N 81°14′55″W
- Country: United States
- State: South Carolina
- County: Hampton

Area
  - Total: 3.17 sq mi (8.20 km^{2})
  - Land: 3.17 sq mi (8.20 km^{2})
  - Water: 0 sq mi (0.00 km^{2})
- Elevation: 95 ft (29 m)

Population (2020)
  - Total: 158
  - Density: 49.9/sq mi (19.28/km^{2})
- Time zone: UTC-5 (Eastern (EST))
  - Summer (DST): UTC-4 (EDT)
- ZIP code: 29939
- Area codes: 803, 839
- FIPS code: 45-64465
- GNIS feature ID: 2407298

Scotia is a town in Hampton County, South Carolina, United States. As of the 2020 census, Scotia had a population of 158.

== Geography ==
Scotia is located in southwestern Hampton County. U.S. Route 321 (Columbia Highway) passes through the center of town, leading north 5 miles (8 km) to Estill and south the same distance to Garnett. South Carolina Highway 333 runs east from Scotia 3 miles (5 km) to Furman. Hampton, the county seat, is 17 miles (27 km) northeast of Scotia.

According to the United States Census Bureau, the town has a total area of 3.2 square miles (8.2 km^{2}), all land.

== Demographics ==
Historical population
Census	Pop.	Note	%±
1910	189		—
1920	269		42.3%
1930	324		20.4%
1940	238		−26.5%
1950	226		−5.0%
1960	102		−54.9%
1970	64		−37.3%
1980	72		12.5%
1990	182		152.8%
2000	227		24.7%
2010	215		−5.3%
2020	158		−26.5%
U.S. Decennial Census

=== 2020 census ===
Scotia town, South Carolina – Racial and ethnic composition Note: the US Census treats Hispanic/Latino as an ethnic category. This table excludes Latinos from the racial categories and assigns them to a separate category. Hispanics/Latinos may be of any race.
Race / Ethnicity (NH = Non-Hispanic)	Pop 2000	Pop 2010	Pop 2020	% 2000	% 2010	% 2020
White alone (NH)	57	62	50	25.11%	28.84%	31.65%
Black or African American alone (NH)	165	153	105	72.69%	71.16%	66.46%
Native American or Alaska Native alone (NH)	0	0	0	0.00%	0.00%	0.00%
Asian alone (NH)	0	0	0	0.00%	0.00%	0.00%
Native Hawaiian or Pacific Islander alone (NH)	0	0	0	0.00%	0.00%	0.00%
Other race alone (NH)	0	0	0	0.00%	0.00%	0.00%
Mixed race or Multiracial (NH)	0	0	1	0.00%	0.00%	0.63%
Hispanic or Latino (any race)	5	0	2	2.20%	0.00%	1.27%
Total	227	215	158	100.00%	100.00%	100.00%

=== 2000 census ===
As of the census of 2000, there were 227 people, 86 households, and 63 families residing in the town. The population density was 71.3 inhabitants per square mile (27.5/km^{2}). There were 99 housing units at an average density of 31.1 per square mile (12.0/km^{2}). The racial makeup of the town was 26.43% White and 73.57% African American. Hispanic or Latino of any race were 2.20% of the population.

There were 86 households, out of which 34.9% had children under the age of 18 living with them, 48.8% were married couples living together, 16.3% had a female householder with no husband present, and 26.7% were non-families. 25.6% of all households were made up of individuals, and 11.6% had someone living alone who was 65 years of age or older. The average household size was 2.64 and the average family size was 3.14.

In the town, the population was spread out, with 29.5% under the age of 18, 6.6% from 18 to 24, 24.7% from 25 to 44, 24.7% from 45 to 64, and 14.5% who were 65 years of age or older. The median age was 39 years. For every 100 females, there were 99.1 males. For every 100 females age 18 and over, there were 86.0 males.

The median income for a household in the town was $22,292, and the median income for a family was $33,250. Males had a median income of $22,250 versus $22,917 for females. The per capita income for the town was $13,202. About 23.1% of families and 25.1% of the population were below the poverty line, including 27.0% of those under the age of eighteen and 21.7% of those 65 or over.
