= Haigler House =

Historic house in South Carolina, United States

- U.S. National Register of Historic Places
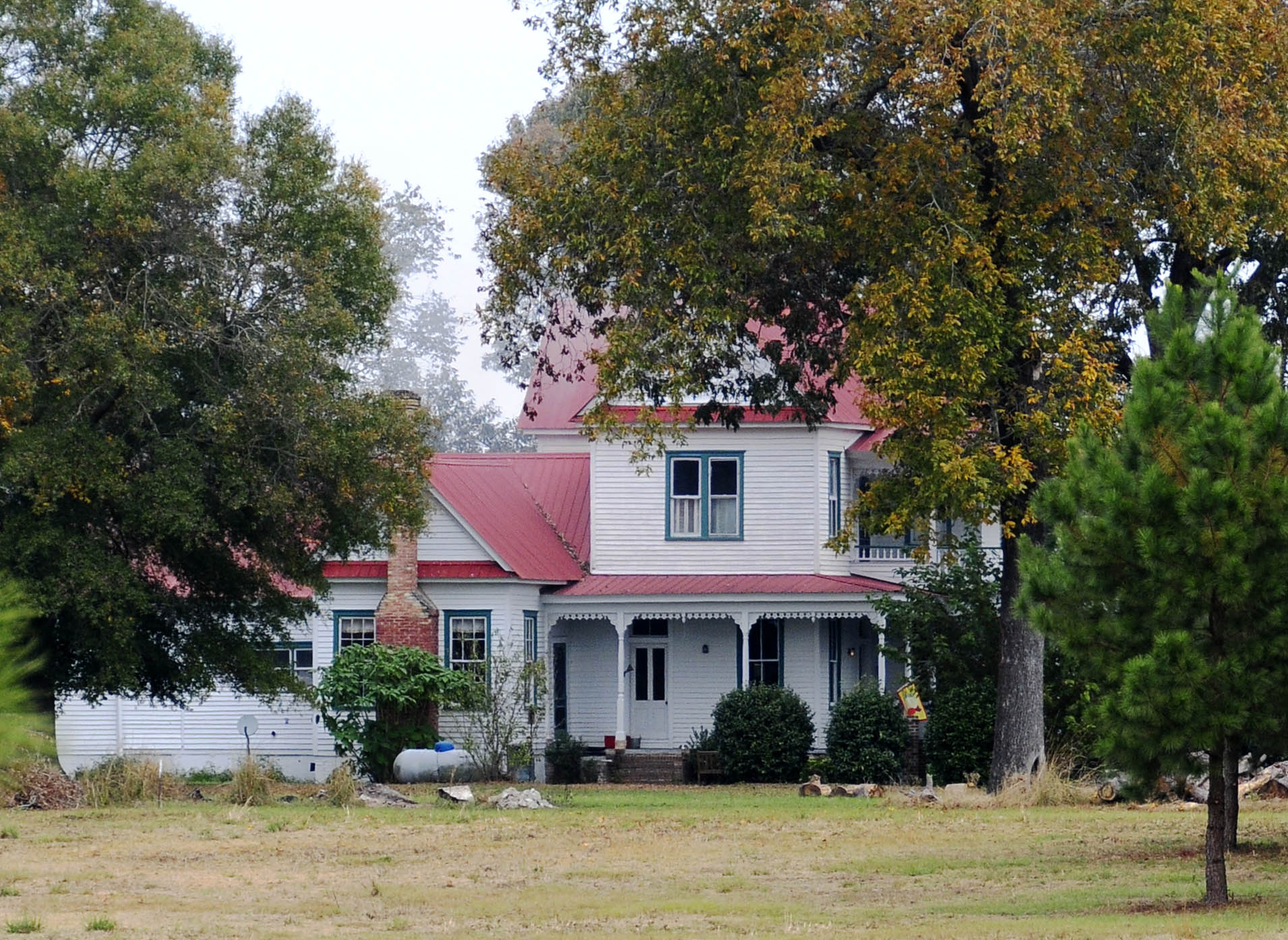
- Haigler House, November 2012

- Location within South Carolina Location within the United States
- Location: Winding Brook Dr., near Cameron, South Carolina
- Coordinates: 33°33′45″N 80°40′52″W
- Area: 14.9 acres (6.0 ha)
- Built: 1893
- Architectural style: Queen Anne
- NRHP reference No.: 01001099
- Added to NRHP: October 12, 2001

Haigler House is a historic home located near Cameron, Calhoun County, South Carolina with approximately fifteen acres of land. It was built in 1893 by Thomas Shadrack Haigler, and is a simple two-story, frame, Queen Anne style farmhouse accentuated with Folk Victorian decorative details. The house features approximately 3,000 square feet of exterior porches with decorative spindlework and carved brackets. The property also includes an ice house, a spring house, and a chicken coop / pony stall. Cotton fields surround the house and are still cultivated today.

Thomas Haigler inherited 910 acres of land from his father in the latter part of the 19th century and subsequently purchased an additional 305 acres. On this property, he constructed a home where he resided with his first wife, Frances, and their seven children. Following Frances's death in 1913, Haigler remarried and had an additional four children with his second wife, Agnes. All 11 children were raised in the house. During the 1920s, Haigler encountered financial difficulties and began mortgaging parcels of the land. By 1927, all of the property had been auctioned off and purchased by the Bank of Cameron. In the late 1940s, A.W. Stanfield acquired 43 acres, including the house, which remained in the Stanfield family until 1996. It was listed in the National Register of Historic Places in 2001.
