= Locust, North Carolina =

- City
- Flag Seal
- Motto: "The City with a Soul"
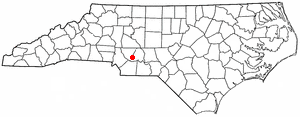
- Location of Locust, North Carolina
- Coordinates: 35°16′07″N 80°26′12″W
- Country: United States
- State: North Carolina
- Counties: Stanly, Cabarrus

Area
  - Total: 8.19 sq mi (21.21 km^{2})
  - Land: 8.19 sq mi (21.21 km^{2})
  - Water: 0 sq mi (0.00 km^{2})
- Elevation: 627 ft (191 m)

Population (2020)
  - Total: 4,537
  - Density: 554.0/sq mi (213.89/km^{2})
- Time zone: UTC-5 (Eastern (EST))
  - Summer (DST): UTC-4 (EDT)
- ZIP code: 28097
- Area code: 704
- FIPS code: 37-38860
- GNIS feature ID: 2404946
- Website: www.locustnc.com

Locust is a small rural city in Stanly and Cabarrus counties in the U.S. state of North Carolina. As of the 2020 census, Locust had a population of 4,537. It has seen substantial growth lately due to the urban sprawl from the Charlotte area.

== Geography ==
Locust is located in southwestern Stanly County. Through annexations, the city limits now extend west into Cabarrus County. Locust is bordered by the town of Stanfield to the south.

The center of Locust is at the intersection of combined North Carolina Highway 24/27 with North Carolina Highway 200. NC 24/27 leads east 15 miles (24 km) to Albemarle and west to the Charlotte area. Via NC 27 it is 25 miles (40 km) to the Charlotte center city. NC 200 leads northwest to US 601 and provides a route to Concord, 15 miles (24 km) away, and leads southwest 22 miles (35 km) to Monroe.

According to the United States Census Bureau, the city of Locust has a total area of 8.1 square miles (21.1 km^{2}), with no significant water bodies.

== Demographics ==
Historical population
Census	Pop.	Note	%±
1880	35		—
1920	95		—
1930	103		8.4%
1940	151		46.6%
1950	216		43.0%
1960	211		−2.3%
1980	1,590		—
1990	1,940		22.0%
2000	2,416		24.5%
2010	2,930		21.3%
2020	4,537		54.8%
2023 (est.)	5,854		29.0%
U.S. Decennial Census

=== 2020 census ===
As of the 2020 census, Locust had a population of 4,537. The median age was 38.8 years. 24.1% of residents were under the age of 18 and 19.0% were 65 years of age or older. For every 100 females there were 92.4 males, and for every 100 females age 18 and over there were 87.3 males.

0.0% of residents lived in urban areas, while 100.0% lived in rural areas.

There were 1,837 households, of which 32.8% had children under the age of 18 living in them. Of all households, 53.4% were married-couple households, 13.1% were households with a male householder and no spouse or partner present, and 28.7% were households with a female householder and no spouse or partner present. About 27.0% of all households were made up of individuals, and 13.9% had someone living alone who was 65 years of age or older.

There were 1,925 housing units, of which 4.6% were vacant. The homeowner vacancy rate was 1.0% and the rental vacancy rate was 3.1%.

Locust racial composition
Race	Number	Percentage
White (non-Hispanic)	3,703	81.62%
Black or African American (non-Hispanic)	249	5.49%
Native American	8	0.18%
Asian	44	0.97%
Pacific Islander	4	0.09%
Other/Mixed	216	4.76%
Hispanic or Latino	313	6.9%

=== 2000 census ===
As of the census of 2000, there were 2,416 people, 922 households, and 712 families residing in the city. The population density was 470.5 inhabitants per square mile (181.7/km^{2}). There were 981 housing units at an average density of 191.0 units per square mile (73.7 units/km^{2}). The racial makeup of the city was 94.91% White, 1.53% African American, 0.46% Native American, 0.17% Asian, 2.03% from other races, and 0.91% from two or more races. Hispanic or Latino of any race were 3.39% of the population.

There were 922 households, out of which 35.2% had children under the age of 18 living with them, 65.9% were married couples living together, 7.9% had a female householder with no husband present, and 22.7% were non-families. 20.4% of all households were made up of individuals, and 8.2% had someone living alone who was 65 years of age or older. The average household size was 2.62 and the average family size was 3.02.

In the city, the population was spread out, with 26.2% under the age of 18, 6.7% from 18 to 24, 32.8% from 25 to 44, 22.8% from 45 to 64, and 11.5% who were 65 years of age or older. The median age was 36 years. For every 100 females, there were 100.3 males. For every 100 females age 18 and over, there were 97.3 males.

The median income for a household in the city was $44,556, and the median income for a family was $50,987. Males had a median income of $35,614 versus $21,375 for females. The per capita income for the city was $19,250. About 3.2% of families and 4.1% of the population were below the poverty line, including 6.9% of those under age 18 and 2.5% of those age 65 or over.

== Notable people ==
- Adeem the Artist, singer-songwriter
