= South Carolina Highway 419 =

State highway in South Carolina, United States

South Carolina Highway 419

Route information
- Maintained by SCDOT
- Length: 6.510 mi (10.477 km)

Major junctions
- South end: SC 267 near Fort Motte
- US 601 near Fort Motte
- North end: Mosley Road / Fort Motte Road / Town Square Street in Fort Motte

Location
- Country: United States
- State: South Carolina
- Counties: Calhoun

Highway system
- South Carolina State Highway System; Interstate; US; State; Scenic
← SC 418	→ SC 420

South Carolina Highway 419 (SC 419) is a 6.510-mile (10.477 km) state highway in the U.S. state of South Carolina. The highway connects rural areas of Calhoun County with Fort Motte.

== Route description ==
SC 419 begins at an intersection with SC 267 (McCords Ferry Road) southeast of Fort Motte, Calhoun County. It travels to the northwest and intersects U.S. Route 601 (US 601; Colonel Thomson Highway). The highway continues to the northwest and enters Fort Motte. There, it crosses over Buckhead Creek and a Norfolk Southern Railway railroad line. Immediately afterward, it meets its northern terminus, an intersection with the eastern terminus of Mosley Road and the western terminus of Town Square Street. Here, the roadway continues as Fort Motte Road.

== Major intersections ==
The entire route is in Calhoun County.

Location	mi	km	Destinations	Notes
	0.000	0.000	SC 267 (McCords Ferry Road) – Eastover	Southern terminus
	4.010	6.453	US 601 (Colonel Thomson Highway) – St. Matthews, Camden	
Fort Motte	6.510	10.477	Mosley Road west / Fort Motte Road north / Town Square Street east	Northern terminus of SC 419; eastern terminus of Mosley Road; western terminus of Town Square Street; Fort Motte Road continues past intersection.
1.000 mi = 1.609 km; 1.000 km = 0.621 mi
