= South Carolina Highway 96 (1940s) =

South Carolina State Highway

South Carolina Highway 96

Route information
- Maintained by SCDOT
- Existed: 1940–1947

Western section
- West end: US 521 near Lancaster
- Major intersections: SC 200 near Lancaster; SC 923 northeast of Lancaster; SC 522 northeast of Lancaster; SC 273 near Taxahaw
- East end: SC 906 near Taxahaw

Eastern section
- South end: SC 9 south of Taxahaw
- North end: SC 943 in Taxahaw

Location
- Country: United States
- State: South Carolina
- Counties: Lancaster

Highway system
- South Carolina State Highway System; Interstate; US; State; Scenic
| ← I-95 | → SC 97 |

South Carolina Highway 96 (SC 96) was a state highway that existed in the central part of Lancaster County. It was split into two different parts. The two parts effectively served as a bypass of Lancaster and Taxahaw.

== Route description ==
The western segment of SC 96 began at an intersection with U.S. Route 521 (US 521) north-northwest of Lancaster. It traveled to the east-northeast and met SC 200 north-northeast of the city. Northeast of the city, it first met SC 923 and then SC 522 (the latter one was just south of the North Carolina state line). It curved to the southeast and met the southern terminus of SC 273 north-northeast of Taxahaw. It headed to the south-southeast and reached its eastern terminus, an intersection with SC 906 (now SC 9's current path).

The eastern segment of SC 96 was a north–south highway that began at an intersection with SC 9's former path (now US 601) at a point south of Taxahaw. It proceeded in a fairly northerly direction and met its northern terminus, an intersection with the eastern terminus of SC 943 (now Overbrook Road).

== History ==
SC 96's western segment was established in 1940 from SC 200 to SC 906. Its eastern segment was established at this time, as well. In 1942, the western terminus was extended to US 521. It was decommissioned in 1947. It was downgraded to secondary roads.

== Major intersections ==
The entire route was in Lancaster County.

| Location | mi | km | Destinations | Notes |
|---|---|---|---|---|
| | | | US 521 | Western terminus of western segment |
| | | | SC 200 | |
| | | | SC 923 | |
| | | | SC 522 | |
| | | | SC 273 north | Southern terminus of SC 273 |
| | | | SC 906 | Eastern terminus of western segment; now SC 9 |
Gap in route
| | | | SC 9 | Southern terminus of eastern segment; now US 601 |
| Taxahaw | | | SC 943 west | Northern terminus of eastern segment; eastern terminus of SC 943, which is now Overbrook Road |
1.000 mi = 1.609 km; 1.000 km = 0.621 mi
