= Tarboro, South Carolina =

Unincorporated community in South Carolina, US

Coordinates: 32°31′55″N 81°09′15″W

Tarboro is an unincorporated community located in Jasper County, South Carolina, United States. It is near the southern terminus of U.S. 601 at its junction with U.S. 321.

It was formerly served by a Southern Railways train route that connected to nearby Allendale, Lena, and Furman. Operating from c. 1899 to c. 1980 to The line inevitably closed due to unprofitability.
