= Stanly Community College =

College in Albemarle, North Carolina, U.S.

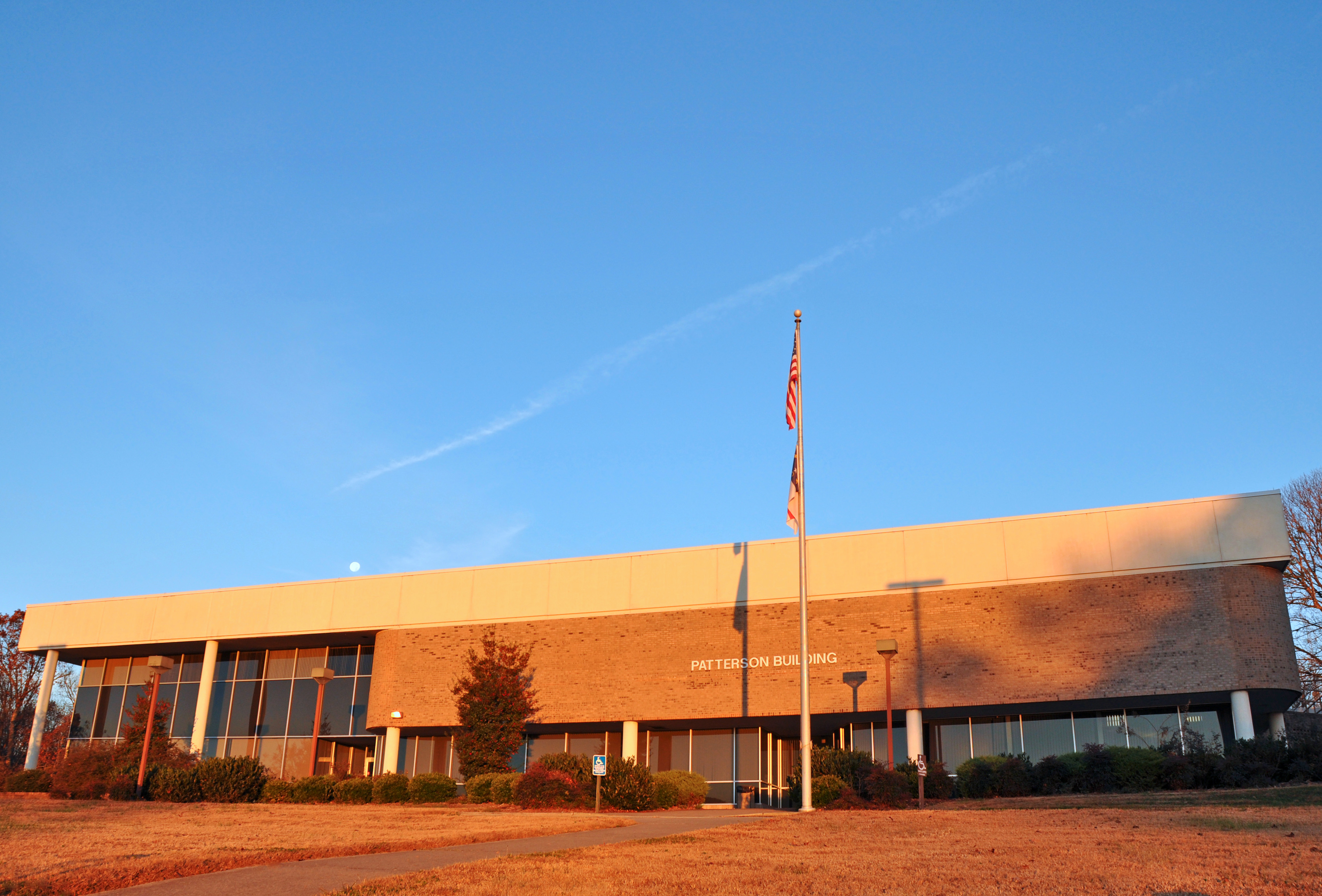
- Motto: "Changing Lives!"
- Type: Public community college
- Established: 1971
- Parent institution: North Carolina Community College System
- President: John D. Enamait
- Students: 10,000
- Location: Albemarle, North Carolina, United States; 35.33947°N 80.2362°W
- Satellite: Locust, North Carolina, United States
- Colors: Blue and Yellow
- Mascot: Eagle
- Website: www.stanly.edu

Stanly Community College (SCC) is a public community college in Albemarle, North Carolina. It is part of the North Carolina Community College System. It has a satellite campus in Locust, North Carolina and is accredited by the Southern Association of Colleges and Schools (SACS). The college serves over 10,000 students annually in associate degree, diploma, certificate, general education, occupational training, adult literacy, and a comprehensive online degree program.
