= Brookdale, South Carolina =

- CDP
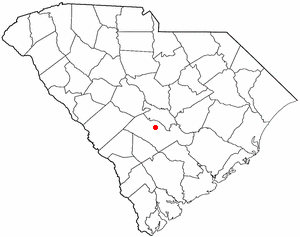
- Location in Orangeburg County, South Carolina
- Coordinates: 33°30′43″N 80°50′15″W
- Country: United States
- State: South Carolina
- County: Orangeburg

Area
  - Total: 3.64 sq mi (9.44 km^{2})
  - Land: 3.64 sq mi (9.43 km^{2})
  - Water: 0.0039 sq mi (0.01 km^{2})
- Elevation: 246 ft (75 m)

Population (2020)
  - Total: 3,845
  - Density: 1,055.8/sq mi (407.65/km^{2})
- Time zone: UTC-5 (EST)
  - Summer (DST): UTC-4 (EDT)
- FIPS code: 45-09527
- GNIS feature ID: 2402719

Brookdale is a census-designated place (CDP) in Orangeburg County, South Carolina, United States. The population was 4,724 at the 2000 census.

== Geography ==
According to the United States Census Bureau, the CDP has a total area of 3.6 square miles (9.3 km^{2}), all land.

== Demographics ==
Historical population
Census	Pop.	Note	%±
2000	4,724		—
2010	4,873		3.2%
2020	3,845		−21.1%
U.S. Decennial Census

=== Racial and ethnic composition ===
Brookdale CDP, South Carolina – Racial and ethnic composition Note: the US Census treats Hispanic/Latino as an ethnic category. This table excludes Latinos from the racial categories and assigns them to a separate category. Hispanics/Latinos may be of any race.
Race / Ethnicity (NH = Non-Hispanic)	Pop 2000	Pop 2010	Pop 2020	% 2000	% 2010	% 2020
White alone (NH)	43	35	48	0.91%	0.72%	1.25%
Black or African American alone (NH)	4,620	4,752	3,681	97.80%	97.52%	95.73%
Native American or Alaska Native alone (NH)	8	5	8	0.17%	0.10%	0.21%
Asian alone (NH)	4	11	2	0.08%	0.23%	0.05%
Native Hawaiian or Pacific Islander alone (NH)	1	0	7	0.02%	0.00%	0.18%
Other race alone (NH)	0	0	8	0.00%	0.00%	0.21%
Mixed race or Multiracial (NH)	18	36	66	0.38%	0.74%	1.72%
Hispanic or Latino (any race)	30	34	25	0.64%	0.70%	0.65%
Total	4,724	4,873	3,845	100.00%	100.00%	100.00%

=== 2020 census ===
As of the 2020 census, Brookdale had a population of 3,845. The median age was 34.1 years. 21.0% of residents were under the age of 18 and 21.7% of residents were 65 years of age or older. For every 100 females there were 72.1 males, and for every 100 females age 18 and over there were 66.0 males age 18 and over.

97.7% of residents lived in urban areas, while 2.3% lived in rural areas.

There were 1,436 households in Brookdale, of which 27.0% had children under the age of 18 living in them. Of all households, 20.4% were married-couple households, 24.9% were households with a male householder and no spouse or partner present, and 51.4% were households with a female householder and no spouse or partner present. About 39.9% of all households were made up of individuals and 20.1% had someone living alone who was 65 years of age or older.

There were 2,182 housing units, of which 34.2% were vacant. The homeowner vacancy rate was 2.7% and the rental vacancy rate was 26.7%.

=== 2000 census ===
As of the census of 2000, there were 4,724 people, 1,901 households, and 1,239 families residing in the CDP. The population density was 1,298.3 inhabitants per square mile (501.3/km^{2}). There were 2,325 housing units at an average density of 639.0 per square mile (246.7/km^{2}). The racial makeup of the CDP was 98.05% African American, 0.95% White, 0.17% Native American, 0.08% Asian, 0.02% Pacific Islander, 0.21% from other races, and 0.51% from two or more races. Hispanic or Latino of any race were 0.64% of the population.

There were 1,901 households, out of which 29.7% had children under the age of 18 living with them, 25.7% were married couples living together, 33.4% had a female householder with no husband present, and 34.8% were non-families. 29.9% of all households were made up of individuals, and 12.7% had someone living alone who was 65 years of age or older. The average household size was 2.49 and the average family size was 3.08.

In the CDP, the population was spread out, with 28.0% under the age of 18, 13.0% from 18 to 24, 22.0% from 25 to 44, 21.9% from 45 to 64, and 15.2% who were 65 years of age or older. The median age was 33 years. For every 100 females, there were 83.9 males. For every 100 females age 18 and over, there were 73.2 males.

The median income for a household in the CDP was $21,984, and the median income for a family was $27,128. Males had a median income of $25,857 versus $20,000 for females. The per capita income for the CDP was $12,852. About 28.9% of families and 32.4% of the population were below the poverty line, including 44.7% of those under age 18 and 29.1% of those age 65 or over.
