= Furman, South Carolina =

- Town
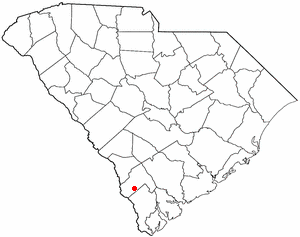
- Location of Furman, South Carolina
- Coordinates: 32°40′52″N 81°11′16″W
- Country: United States
- State: South Carolina
- County: Hampton

Government
  - Type: Council

Area
  - Total: 3.12 sq mi (8.07 km^{2})
  - Land: 3.12 sq mi (8.07 km^{2})
  - Water: 0 sq mi (0.00 km^{2})
- Elevation: 115 ft (35 m)

Population (2020)
  - Total: 224
  - Density: 71.8/sq mi (27.74/km^{2})
- Time zone: UTC-5 (Eastern (EST))
  - Summer (DST): UTC-4 (EDT)
- ZIP code: 29921
- Area codes: 803 and 839
- FIPS code: 45-27835
- GNIS feature ID: 2406533

Furman is a town in Hampton County, South Carolina, United States. The population was 224 at the 2020 census, down from 239 at the 2010 census. It is not to be confused with Furman University, which is in Greenville, South Carolina.

== Geography ==
Furman is located in southwestern Hampton County. U.S. Route 601 (Savannah Highway) passes through the town center, leading north 14 miles (23 km) to Hampton, the county seat, and south 9 miles (14 km) to its terminus at U.S. Route 321. Hardeeville is 28 miles (45 km) south of Furman, and Savannah, Georgia, is 45 miles (72 km) to the south.

According to the United States Census Bureau, Furman has a total area of 3.1 square miles (8.1 km^{2}), all land.

== Demographics ==
Historical population
| Census | Pop. | Note | %± |
|---|---|---|---|
| 1920 | 296 | | — |
| 1930 | 270 | | −8.8% |
| 1940 | 380 | | 40.7% |
| 1950 | 293 | | −22.9% |
| 1960 | 244 | | −16.7% |
| 1970 | 239 | | −2.0% |
| 1980 | 348 | | 45.6% |
| 1990 | 260 | | −25.3% |
| 2000 | 286 | | 10.0% |
| 2010 | 239 | | −16.4% |
| 2020 | 224 | | −6.3% |
| 2021 (est.) | 232 | ▲ | 3.6% |
U.S. Decennial Census

=== 2020 census ===
Furman town, South Carolina – Racial and ethnic composition Note: the US Census treats Hispanic/Latino as an ethnic category. This table excludes Latinos from the racial categories and assigns them to a separate category. Hispanics/Latinos may be of any race.
| Race / Ethnicity (NH = Non-Hispanic) | Pop 2000 | Pop 2010 | Pop 2020 | % 2000 | % 2010 | % 2020 |
|---|---|---|---|---|---|---|
| White alone (NH) | 79 | 60 | 52 | 27.62% | 25.10% | 23.21% |
| Black or African American alone (NH) | 207 | 174 | 164 | 72.38% | 72.80% | 73.21% |
| Native American or Alaska Native alone (NH) | 0 | 0 | 02 | 0.00% | 0.00% | 0.89% |
| Asian alone (NH) | 0 | 0 | 0 | 0.00% | 0.00% | 0.00% |
| Native Hawaiian or Pacific Islander alone (NH) | 0 | 0 | 0 | 0.00% | 0.00% | 0.00% |
| Other race alone (NH) | 0 | 0 | 0 | 0.00% | 0.00% | 0.00% |
| Mixed race or Multiracial (NH) | 0 | 2 | 2 | 0.00% | 0.84% | 0.89% |
| Hispanic or Latino (any race) | 0 | 3 | 4 | 0.00% | 1.26% | 1.79% |
| Total | 286 | 239 | 224 | 100.00% | 100.00% | 100.00% |

=== 2000 census ===
As of the census of 2000, there were 286 people, 108 households, and 80 families residing in the town. The population density was 91.8 people per square mile (35.4 people/km^{2}). There were 126 housing units at an average density of 40.4 per square mile (15.6/km^{2}). The racial makeup of the town was 27.62% White and 72.38% African American.

There were 108 households, out of which 38.0% had children under the age of 18 living with them, 50.0% were married couples living together, 18.5% had a female householder with no husband present, and 25.9% were non-families. 23.1% of all households were made up of individuals, and 6.5% had someone living alone who was 65 years of age or older. The average household size was 2.65 and the average family size was 3.11.

In the town, the population was spread out, with 29.7% under the age of 18, 9.1% from 18 to 24, 25.2% from 25 to 44, 21.3% from 45 to 64, and 14.7% who were 65 years of age or older. The median age was 35 years. For every 100 females, there were 90.7 males. For every 100 females age 18 and over, there were 91.4 males.

The median income for a household in the town was $23,125, and the median income for a family was $27,750. Males had a median income of $25,795 versus $17,292 for females. The per capita income for the town was $12,227. About 19.0% of families and 30.7% of the population were below the poverty line, including 44.4% of those under the age of eighteen and 17.5% of those 65 or over.

== Southern Railway in Furman ==
From 1899 until the 1980s, the Southern Railway operated a line through Furman and nearby Allendale, Tarboro, and Lena. Called the "Southern Columbia to Savannah Route", the rail also ran through Barnwell and Blackville to the north. Its primary purpose was to increase north–south passenger and freight traffic by feeding into the Atlantic Coast Line at Hardeeville for passage south to Florida or north to Charleston and other points. The rail line was built to compete with another north–south rail line operated nearby by the Seaboard Air Line (also called the Florida Central & Peninsular, Seaboard Coast Line, and presently CSX) which ran a different course through Denmark, Fairfax, Estill, and Garnett (parallel to US 321) and then into Georgia. Between 1963 and 1970, Southern abandoned its tracks between Furman and Hardeeville, leaving Furman as the ending station from Columbia. In the early 1980s, Southern abandoned its tracks south of Blackville, ending its rail service to Barnwell, Allendale, and Furman. However, by the 1970s, any rail service to Furman would have been a rare event.
