= Elloree, South Carolina =

- Town
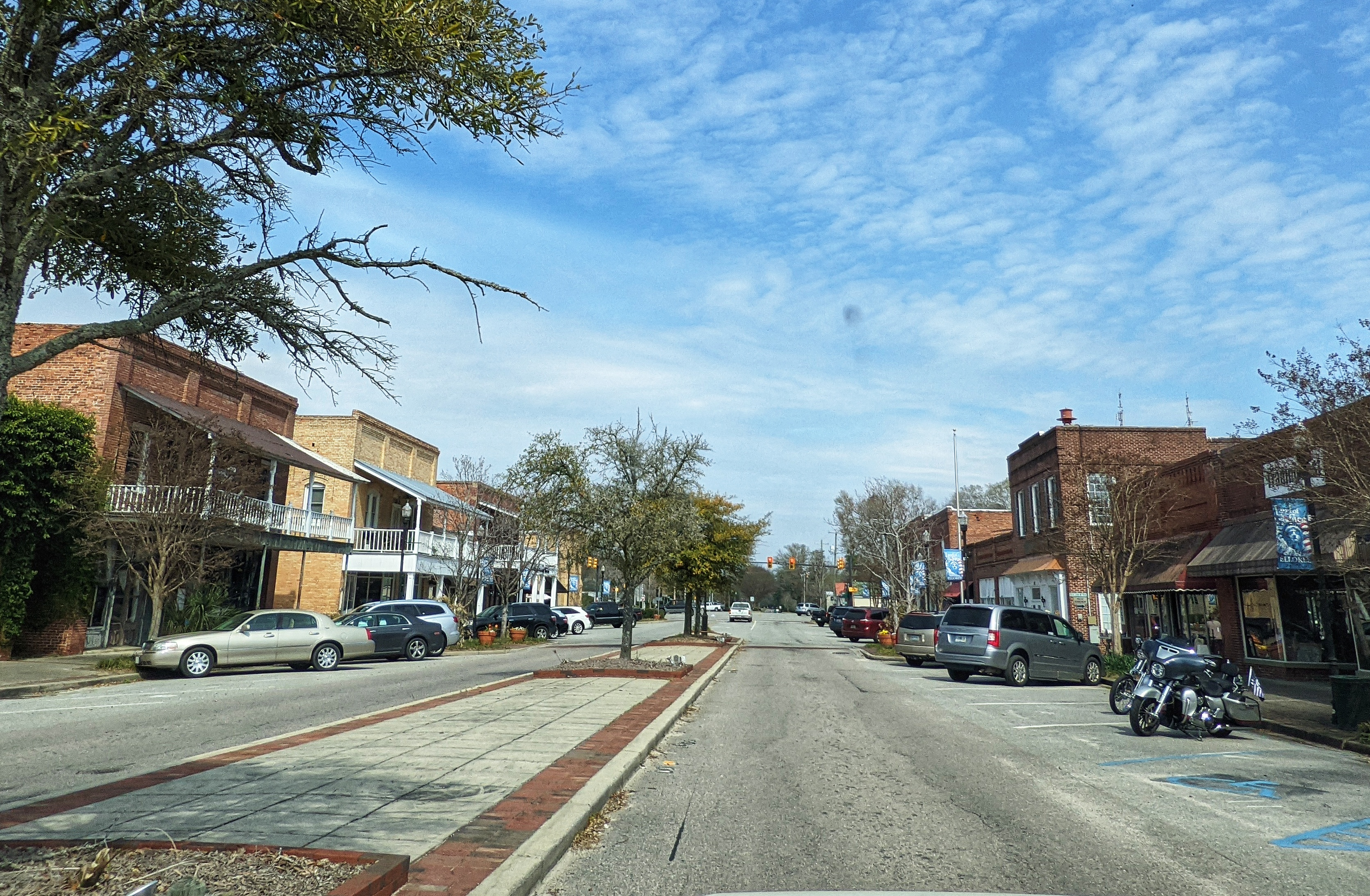
- Downtown Elloree
- Motto: "Home I Love"
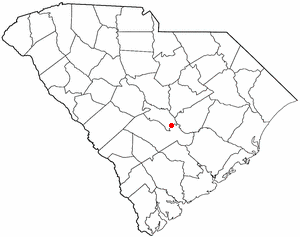
- Location of Elloree, South Carolina
- Coordinates: 33°31′49″N 80°34′16″W
- Country: United States
- State: South Carolina
- County: Orangeburg
- Incorporated: 1886

Area
  - Total: 1.02 sq mi (2.63 km^{2})
  - Land: 1.02 sq mi (2.63 km^{2})
  - Water: 0 sq mi (0.00 km^{2})
- Elevation: 164 ft (50 m)

Population (2020)
  - Total: 570
  - Density: 561.9/sq mi (216.95/km^{2})
- Time zone: UTC-5 (Eastern (EST))
  - Summer (DST): UTC-4 (EDT)
- ZIP code: 29047
- Area codes: 803, 839
- FIPS code: 45-23470
- GNIS feature ID: 2406442
- Website: www.elloreesc.com

Elloree is a town in Orangeburg County, South Carolina, United States. As of the 2020 census, Elloree had a population of 570.

== History ==
Trinity Lutheran Church was added to the National Register of Historic Places in 2008.

== Geography ==
The town is located along the overlap of South Carolina Highway 6 and South Carolina Highway 267 at the northern terminus of South Carolina Highway 47.

According to the United States Census Bureau, the town has a total area of 1.0 square mile (2.6 km^{2}), all land.

== Demographics ==
Historical population
Census	Pop.	Note	%±
1890	311		—
1900	413		32.8%
1910	540		30.8%
1920	925		71.3%
1930	1,098		18.7%
1940	1,123		2.3%
1950	1,127		0.4%
1960	1,031		−8.5%
1970	940		−8.8%
1980	909		−3.3%
1990	939		3.3%
2000	742		−21.0%
2010	692		−6.7%
2020	570		−17.6%
U.S. Decennial Census

=== 2020 census ===
Elloree town, South Carolina – Racial and ethnic composition Note: the US Census treats Hispanic/Latino as an ethnic category. This table excludes Latinos from the racial categories and assigns them to a separate category. Hispanics/Latinos may be of any race.
Race / Ethnicity (NH = Non-Hispanic)	Pop 2000	Pop 2010	Pop 2020	% 2000	% 2010	% 2020
White alone (NH)	412	383	279	55.53%	55.35%	48.95%
Black or African American alone (NH)	326	280	241	43.94%	40.46%	42.28%
Native American or Alaska Native alone (NH)	1	2	0	0.13%	0.29%	0.00%
Asian alone (NH)	0	7	8	0.00%	1.01%	1.40%
Native Hawaiian or Pacific Islander alone (NH)	0	0	0	0.00%	0.00%	0.00%
Other race alone (NH)	0	4	2	0.00%	0.58%	0.35%
Mixed race or Multiracial (NH)	2	10	28	0.27%	1.45%	4.91%
Hispanic or Latino (any race)	1	6	12	0.13%	0.87%	2.11%
Total	742	692	570	100.00%	100.00%	100.00%

As of the 2020 United States census, there were 570 people, 264 households, and 144 families residing in the town.

=== 2000 census ===
As of the census of 2000, there were 742 people, 340 households, and 199 families residing in the town. The population density was 772.3 inhabitants per square mile (298.2/km^{2}). There were 381 housing units at an average density of 396.5 per square mile (153.1/km^{2}). The racial makeup of the town was 55.66% White, 43.94% African American, 0.13% Native American, and 0.27% from two or more races. Hispanic or Latino of any race were 0.13% of the population.

There were 340 households, out of which 21.2% had children under the age of 18 living with them, 37.6% were married couples living together, 17.4% had a female householder with no husband present, and 41.2% were non-families. 37.9% of all households were made up of individuals, and 23.5% had someone living alone who was 65 years of age or older. The average household size was 2.18 and the average family size was 2.89.

In the town, the population was spread out, with 20.6% under the age of 18, 7.8% from 18 to 24, 22.4% from 25 to 44, 24.8% from 45 to 64, and 24.4% who were 65 years of age or older. The median age was 45 years. For every 100 females, there were 77.5 males. For every 100 females age 18 and over, there were 71.7 males.

The median income for a household in the town was $22,574, and the median income for a family was $35,380. Males had a median income of $26,838 versus $21,641 for females. The per capita income for the town was $21,711. About 12.3% of families and 21.1% of the population were below the poverty line, including 33.3% of those under age 18 and 14.6% of those age 65 or over.

== Education ==
Elloree has a public library, a branch of the Orangeburg County Library.

== Notable people ==
- Chris Antley, champion jockey
- William H. Brandenburg, retired major general
- James Hampton, outsider artist
