= Lone Star, South Carolina =

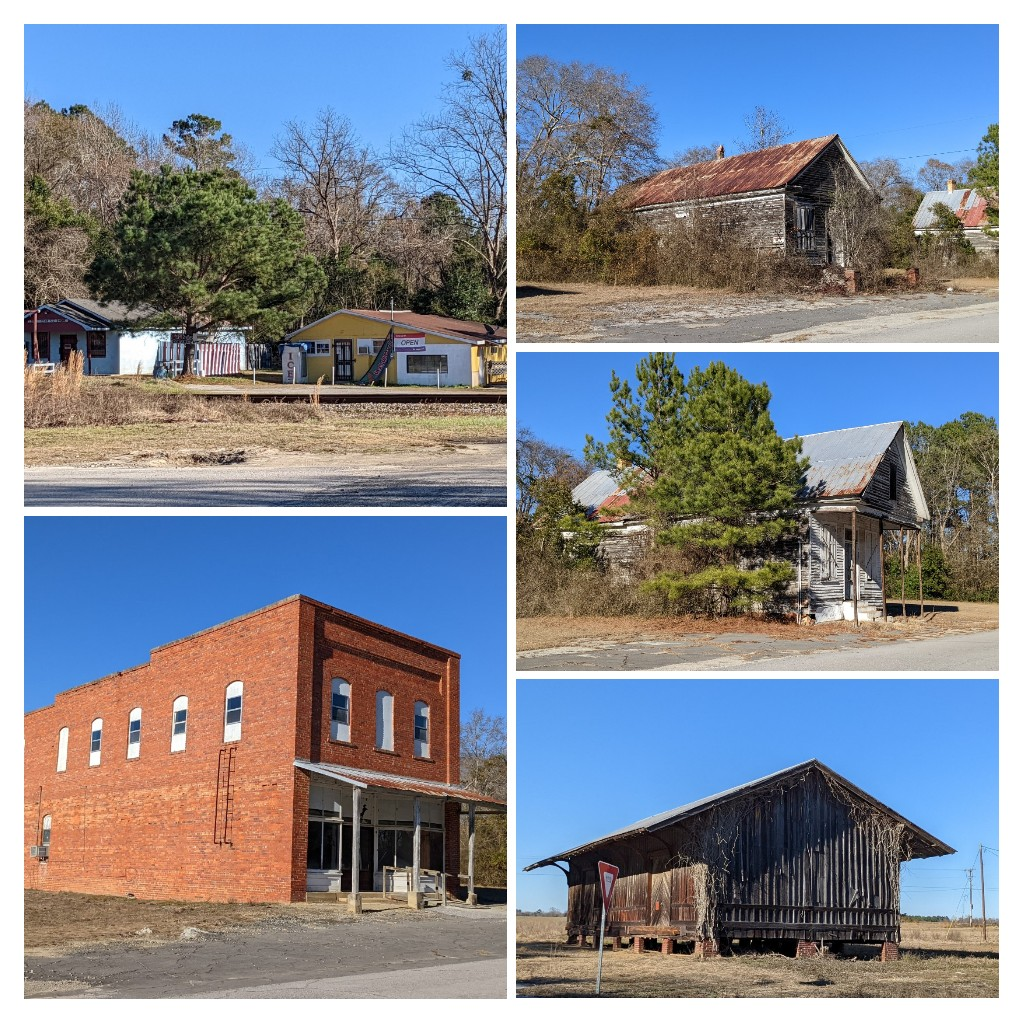
- Buildings in Lone Star
- Interactive map of Lone Star, South Carolina
- Coordinates: 33°37′27″N 80°35′22″W
- Country: United States
- State: South Carolina
- Counties: Calhoun
- Elevation: 171 ft (52 m)
- Time zone: UTC-6 (EST)
  - Summer (DST): UTC-5 (EDT)
- GNIS feature ID: 1224106

Lone Star is an unincorporated community in Calhoun County, South Carolina, United States. The community has the ZIP Code of 29030. It is part of the Columbia, South Carolina Metropolitan Statistical Area.

South Carolina Highway 33 runs between Lone Star, and Orangeburg.
