= Garnett, South Carolina =

- Unincorporated community
- Location within South Carolina Location within the United States
- Coordinates: 32°36′23″N 81°14′43″W
- Country: United States
- State: South Carolina
- County: Hampton
- Elevation: 75 ft (23 m)
- Time zone: UTC-5 (Eastern (EST))
  - Summer (DST): UTC-4 (EDT)
- ZIP code: 29922
- Area codes: 803, 839
- GNIS feature ID: 1231306

Garnett is an unincorporated community in Hampton County, South Carolina, United States. The community is located at the junction of U.S. Route 321 and South Carolina Highway 119, 5.2 miles (8.4 km) south of Scotia. Garnett has a post office with ZIP code 29922.
