= Cameron, South Carolina =

- Town
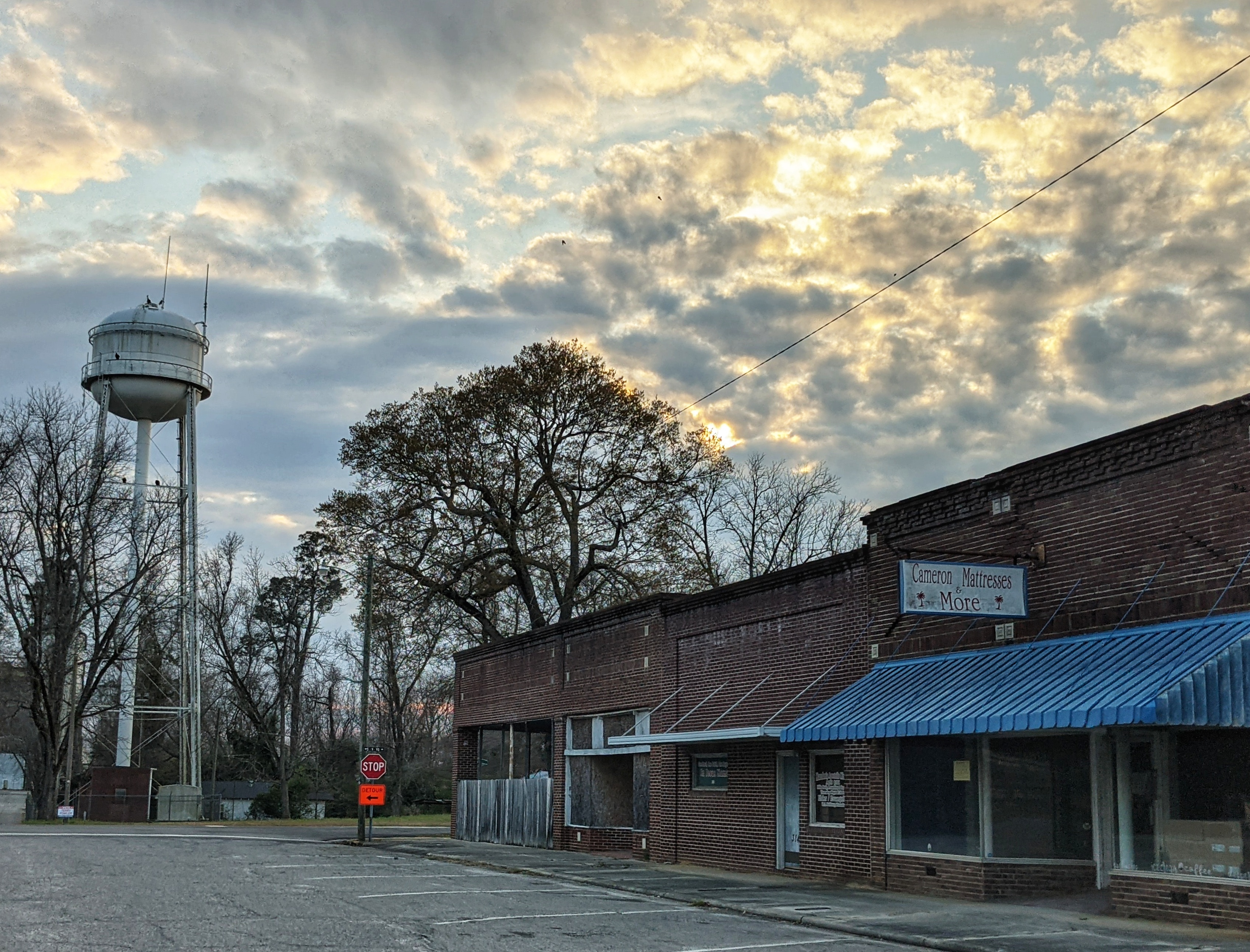
- Downtown Cameron

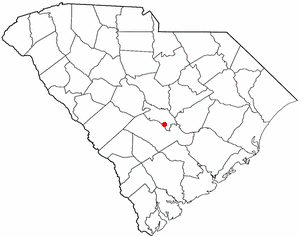
- Location of Cameron, South Carolina
- Coordinates: 33°33′29″N 80°42′54″W
- Country: United States
- State: South Carolina
- County: Calhoun

Area
  - Total: 3.12 sq mi (8.09 km^{2})
  - Land: 3.12 sq mi (8.09 km^{2})
  - Water: 0 sq mi (0.00 km^{2})
- Elevation: 177 ft (54 m)

Population (2020)
  - Total: 376
  - Density: 120.3/sq mi (46.46/km^{2})
- Time zone: UTC-5 (Eastern (EST))
  - Summer (DST): UTC-4 (EDT)
- ZIP code: 29030
- Area codes: 803, 839
- FIPS code: 45-10900
- GNIS feature ID: 2405368

Cameron is a town in Calhoun County, South Carolina, United States. As of the 2020 census, Cameron had a population of 376. It is part of the Columbia, South Carolina Metropolitan Statistical Area.

== History ==
The community derives its name from Clan Cameron of Scotland.

The Haigler House and Ulmer-Summers House are listed on the National Register of Historic Places.

== Geography ==
Cameron is located in southern Calhoun County. U.S. Route 176 (Old State Road) passes through the town, leading northwest 42 miles (68 km) to Columbia and southeast 74 miles (119 km) to Charleston. South Carolina Highway 33 crosses US 176 in the town, leading northeast 5 miles (8 km) to Creston and southwest five miles to Interstate 26 and 9 miles (14 km) to Orangeburg.

According to the United States Census Bureau, Cameron has a total area of 3.1 square miles (8.1 km^{2}), all land.

== Demographics ==
Historical population
Census	Pop.	Note	%±
1900	320		—
1910	421		31.6%
1920	524		24.5%
1930	620		18.3%
1940	624		0.6%
1950	630		1.0%
1960	607		−3.7%
1970	476		−21.6%
1980	536		12.6%
1990	504		−6.0%
2000	449		−10.9%
2010	424		−5.6%
2020	376		−11.3%
U.S. Decennial Census

As of the census of 2000, there were 449 people, 185 households, and 125 families residing in the town. The population density was 143.2 inhabitants per square mile (55.3/km^{2}). There were 201 housing units at an average density of 64.1 per square mile (24.7/km^{2}). The racial makeup of the town was 59.47% White and 40.53% African American.

There were 185 households, out of which 25.9% had children under the age of 18 living with them, 51.9% were married couples living together, 11.9% had a female householder with no husband present, and 32.4% were non-families. 30.3% of all households were made up of individuals, and 14.6% had someone living alone who was 65 years of age or older. The average household size was 2.41 and the average family size was 3.04.

In the town, the age distribution of the population shows 24.1% under the age of 18, 4.9% from 18 to 24, 22.9% from 25 to 44, 29.2% from 45 to 64, and 18.9% who were 65 years of age or older. The median age was 43 years. For every 100 females, there were 91.9 males. For every 100 females age 18 and over, there were 101.8 males.

The median income for a household in the town was $39,792, and the median income for a family was $50,000. Males had a median income of $33,542 versus $20,417 for females. The per capita income for the town was $22,463. About 10.2% of families and 12.5% of the population were below the poverty line, including 19.3% of those under age 18 and 9.6% of those age 65 or over.

== Economy ==
Cameron is known for its agricultural economic basis. The main industries within town are: Cameron Mattress Factory (manufacturers of Spring Air), Cameron Cotton & Seed Company (a cotton gin and warehousing company), Carolina Peanuts, LLC and Golden Kernel Pecan Company.
