= Stanfield, North Carolina =

- Town
- Motto: "Welcome Home"
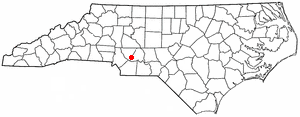
- Location of Stanfield, North Carolina
- Coordinates: 35°14′01″N 80°25′49″W
- Country: United States
- State: North Carolina
- County: Stanly
- Established: 1912

Area
  - Total: 4.47 sq mi (11.58 km^{2})
  - Land: 4.47 sq mi (11.58 km^{2})
  - Water: 0 sq mi (0.00 km^{2})
- Elevation: 597 ft (182 m)

Population (2020)
  - Total: 1,585
  - Density: 355/sq mi (136.9/km^{2})
- Time zone: UTC-5 (Eastern (EST))
  - Summer (DST): UTC-4 (EDT)
- ZIP code: 28163
- Area code: 704
- FIPS code: 37-64460
- GNIS feature ID: 2406655
- Website: www.stanfieldnc.com

Stanfield (English: /ˈstænfiːld/) is a town in Stanly County, North Carolina, United States. As of the 2020 census, Stanfield had a population of 1,585.

== Geography ==
According to the United States Census Bureau, the town has a total area of 4.5 square miles (12 km^{2}), all land.

== Demographics ==
Historical population
Census	Pop.	Note	%±
1960	471		—
1970	458		−2.8%
1980	463		1.1%
1990	517		11.7%
2000	1,113		115.3%
2010	1,486		33.5%
2020	1,585		6.7%
U.S. Decennial Census

=== 2020 census ===
Stanfield racial composition
Race	Number	Percentage
White (non-Hispanic)	1,454	91.74%
Black or African American (non-Hispanic)	19	1.07%
Native American	1	0.06%
Asian	5	0.32%
Pacific Islander	2	0.13%
Other/Mixed	34	2.15%
Hispanic or Latino	72	4.54%

As of the 2020 United States census, there were 1,585 people, 611 households, and 591 families residing in the town.

=== 2000 census ===
As of the census of 2000, there were 1,113 people, 439 households, and 320 families residing in the town. The population density was 249.0 inhabitants per square mile (96.1/km^{2}). There were 459 housing units at an average density of 102.7 per square mile (39.7/km^{2}). The racial makeup of the town was 98.47% White, 0.18% African American, 0.27% Native American, 0.90% from other races, and 0.18% from two or more races. Hispanic or Latino of any race were 1.44% of the population.

There were 439 households, out of which 33.9% had children under the age of 18 living with them, 63.8% were married couples living together, 7.1% had a female householder with no husband present, and 27.1% were non-families. 24.4% of all households were made up of individuals, and 7.3% had someone living alone who was 65 years of age or older. The average household size was 2.53 and the average family size was 3.01.

In the town, the population was spread out, with 26.7% under the age of 18, 6.9% from 18 to 24, 31.8% from 25 to 44, 23.9% from 45 to 64, and 10.7% who were 65 years of age or older. The median age was 35 years. For every 100 females, there were 110.0 males. For every 100 females age 18 and over, there were 104.5 males.

The median income for a household in the town was $45,250, and the median income for a family was $52,813. Males had a median income of $35,625 versus $25,521 for females. The per capita income for the town was $20,666. About 5.9% of families and 9.7% of the population were below the poverty line, including 15.5% of those under age 18 and 11.4% of those age 65 or over.

== History ==
In 1912 the railroad line between Charlotte and Raleigh was completed, and the town of Stanfield was established. The town was named after an engineer who helped complete the railroad through the present day town. Once the rail line was completed, the mail was delivered by train to Stanfield, thus moving the post office from Locust to Stanfield. Three local area schools were combined to create Stanfield School. Pete Henkel Park was created in the 1970s. Today, Stanfield School is now Stanfield Elementary School that runs pre-k through the 5th grade, and the students then go to West Stanly High School in Red Cross, Stanly Early College in Albemarle or to Gray Stone Day School in Misenheimer.
