= National Register of Historic Places listings in Marlboro County, South Carolina =

Location of Marlboro County in South Carolina

This is a list of the National Register of Historic Places listings in Marlboro County, South Carolina.

This is intended to be a complete list of the properties and districts on the National Register of Historic Places in Marlboro County, South Carolina, United States. The locations of National Register properties and districts for which the latitude and longitude coordinates are included below, may be seen in a map.

There are 11 properties and districts listed on the National Register in the county.

This National Park Service list is complete through NPS recent listings posted April 25, 2025.

== Current listings ==
	Name on the Register	Image	Date listed	Location	City or town	Description
1	Appin	Appin	June 28, 1982 (#82003894)	U.S. Route 15; also U.S. Routes 15/401, W., approximately 1 mile southwest of Bennettsville; 34°36′18″N 79°43′03″W	Bennettsville	Second set of boundaries represents a boundary increase of October 3, 2007
2	Bennettsville Historic District	Bennettsville Historic District	April 20, 1978 (#78002525)	Irregular pattern along Main St. from Everett to Lindsey and from Parsonage to Murchison; also Clyde St. between Main and Market Sts. 34°36′58″N 79°40′53″W	Bennettsville	Second set of boundaries represents a boundary increase of June 3, 1993
3	Clio Historic District	Clio Historic District	July 16, 1979 (#79002388)	South Carolina Highways 9 and 381; 34°34′45″N 79°32′49″W	Clio	
4	Jennings-Brown House	Jennings-Brown House	February 23, 1972 (#72001215)	121 S. Marlboro St. 34°36′05″N 79°40′55″W	Bennettsville	
5	Magnolia	Magnolia	March 14, 1973 (#73001721)	508 E. Main St. 34°37′11″N 79°40′38″W	Bennettsville	
6	Manship Farmstead	Manship Farmstead	June 4, 1997 (#97000540)	2601 Manship Rd. 34°39′31″N 79°35′46″W	Tatum	
7	Marlboro County Training School		April 28, 2025 (#100011778)	612 King Street; 34°36′33″N 79°41′32″W	Bennettsville	
8	McLaurin House	McLaurin House	March 24, 1978 (#78002526)	East of Clio on South Carolina Highway 40; 34°35′57″N 79°31′01″W	Clio	
9	McLaurin-Roper-McColl Farmstead	McLaurin-Roper-McColl Farmstead	January 20, 2012 (#11001043)	1104 Laurin Willis Rd. 34°36′59″N 79°33′52″W	Clio	
10	Pegues Place	Pegues Place	January 25, 1971 (#71000790)	North of Wallace, off U.S. Route 1; 34°48′02″N 79°54′40″W	Wallace	
11	Robertson-Easterling-McLaurin House	Robertson-Easterling-McLaurin House	April 5, 1984 (#84002090)	West of Bennettsville off South Carolina Highway 912; 34°40′33″N 79°45′22″W	Bennettsville	

== See also ==
- List of National Historic Landmarks in South Carolina
- National Register of Historic Places listings in South Carolina
