= South Carolina Highway 38 =

State highway in South Carolina

South Carolina Highway 38

Route information
- Maintained by SCDOT
- Length: 43.694 mi (70.319 km)
- Existed: 1926–present

Major junctions
- West end: NC 38 at the North Carolina state line near Hamlet, NC
- US 401 / US 15 / SC 9 in Bennettsville; I-95 near Latta; US 301 near Latta
- East end: US 501 near Latta

Location
- Country: United States
- State: South Carolina
- Counties: Marion, Dillon, Marlboro

Highway system
- South Carolina State Highway System; Interstate; US; State; Scenic
← SC 37	→ SC 39

South Carolina Highway 38 (SC 38) is a 43.694-mile (70.319 km) state highway that extends from Marlboro County near Hamlet, North Carolina to U.S. Route 501 (US 501) in Marion County. The highway travels generally north-to-south (but is signed as west–east) across the eastern portion of the state, and is one of the most popular routes to Myrtle Beach.

== Route description ==
SC 38 begins at the North Carolina state line where the highway continues north towards Hamlet on North Carolina Highway 38. The road, signed eastbound, heads south through rural unincorporated areas of Marlboro County. After entering the city of Bennettsville, it reaches a roundabout where SC 38 Business (SC 38 Bus.) heads directly through the downtown area of the city, SC 38 continues southwest on Oakwood Street. At Cheraw Highway, SC 9 joins SC 38 on a concurrency and SC 9 Bus. heads south. After traveling so far as a two-lane highway, the road expands to four lanes. Shortly after an intersection with SC 385, the road reaches US 15/US 401 and the two state highways form another concurrency with the U.S. routes through a commercial district. At Broad Street, SC 9 Bus. and SC 38 Bus. end and SC 38 turns to the south (SC 9 continues along US 15/US 401).

The highway again travels south through wooded area and farmlands but as a five-lane road (two travel lanes in each direction and a center turn lane). In the town of Blenheim, the highway intersects SC 381 at its southern terminus. South of the town, SC 38 becomes a divided highway. In the unincorporated community of Brownsville, SC 38 intersects SC 34. After crossing into Dillon County, the highway heads along the side of a residential neighborhood in the unincorporated community of Oak Grove and reaches Interstate 95 (I-95) at its exit 181. Shortly afterwards, SC 38 reaches SC 917. Between the towns of Latta and Sellers, SC 38 passes over a railroad and has an interchange with US 301. Continuing southeast, SC 38 crosses into Marion County and ends at a trumpet interchange with US 501.

== History ==
SC 38 was one of the first highways in the South Carolina state system, originally running from Myrtle Beach through Socastee and Conway to Marion and Latta. The section east of Conway became US 117 in 1932 and later SC 544, SC 707, and S-28-15. The section north of Conway became US 501 and SC 319 in 1935.

East of Bennettsville, SC 38 originally went through McColl, South Carolina and entered North Carolina near Laurinburg. In the mid-1920s SC 30 (now US 401) replaced the section east of Bennettsville. Then SC 38 was extended to Gibson, North Carolina around 1930. In 1938, SC 96 became SC 38 north of Bennettsville. In 1939 the road was mostly rebuilt and the road followed its current route for the first time in that area. The former SC 38 became SC 79 and later SC 385.

In September 1951, the section of SC 38 east of the current I-95 became SC 917, and the former SC 380 became SC 38, giving the road its approximate current route on the south end.

A dangerous intersection at US 301 and the CSX railroad was replaced with an interchange.

By 1978, a bypass was built around Bennettsville, with the previous SC 38 designated as SC 38 Business.

During a 15-year period starting in the early 1990s, SC 38 was widened to four lanes, with medians in some areas and a center turn lane in others, in stages from Bennettsville to US 501.

In 2005, highway officials from North and South Carolina met and passed a resolution designating that Interstate 73 would be built along the route of SC 38. However, a 2008 project map shows the likely I-73 route running east of 38. In June 2012, though, Miley and Associates of Columbia, South Carolina recommended improvements to SC 38 and US 501 to create the Grand Strand Expressway (GSX), a position long held by the Coastal Conservation League, which asked for the study. SC Representative Alan Clemmons, head of the National I-73 Corridor Association, said such a plan had been considered but was not likely.

On April 10, 2018, the Marlboro County Council passed a resolution supporting widening SC 38 to four lanes north of Bennettsville, to attract industry, and because that would be cheaper than building I-73, which would hurt businesses along SC 38.

== Major intersections ==
County	Location	mi	km	Destinations	Notes
Marlboro		0.000	0.000	NC 38 north – Hamlet	Continuation into North Carolina
Marlboro		6.550	10.541	SC 79 – Gibson, Cheraw	
Marlboro	Bennettsville	11.371	18.300	SC 38 Bus. east (Hamlet Highway) – Bennettsville	Western terminus of SC 38 Bus.; roundabout
Marlboro	Bennettsville	12.004	19.319	SC 9 north / SC 9 Bus. south (Cheraw Highway) – Cheraw, Bennettsville	Western end of SC 9 concurrency; northern terminus of SC 9 Bus.
Marlboro	Bennettsville	13.834	22.264	SC 385 (West Main Street) – Hartsville	
Marlboro	Bennettsville	14.294	23.004	US 15 south / US 401 south – Darlington, Hartsville	Western end of US 15/US 401 concurrency
Marlboro	Bennettsville	16.264	26.174	US 15 north / US 401 north / SC 9 south / SC 9 Bus. north / SC 38 Bus. west (Broad Street) – North Myrtle Beach, Dillon, Laurinburg	Eastern end of US 15/US 401 and SC 9 concurrencies; southern terminus of SC 9 Bus.; eastern terminus of SC 38 Bus.
Marlboro	Blenheim	22.394	36.040	SC 381 north / West High Street – Clio	Southern terminus of SC 381
Marlboro	Brownsville	31.484	50.669	SC 34 – Darlington, Bingham	
Dillon	Oak Grove	36.467– 36.514	58.688– 58.764	I-95 – Florence, Dillon	I-95 exit 181
Dillon		37.684	60.647	SC 917 south – Latta, Mullins	Northern terminus of SC 917
Dillon		41.704– 41.714	67.116– 67.132	US 301 – Latta, Florence, Dillon	Interchange
Marion		43.504– 43.694	70.013– 70.319	US 501 – Marion, Myrtle Beach, Latta, Dillon	Eastern terminus; interchange
1.000 mi = 1.609 km; 1.000 km = 0.621 mi: Concurrency terminus

== Business loop ==
South Carolina Highway 38 Business
- Location: Bennettsville, South Carolina
- Length: 2.865 mi (4.611 km)

South Carolina Highway 38 Business (SC 38 Bus.) is a 2.865-mile (4.611 km) business route of SC 38 in Bennettsville. It begins at the intersection with U.S. Route 15 (US 15), US 401, SC 9, and SC 38 south of town. The route begins running concurrent with SC 9 heading north along Broad Street. In front of the Marlboro County Courthouse, both SC 9 and SC 38 Bus. make a left along Main Street until reaching the southern terminus of Cheraw Street. Where Cheraw Street and Hamlet Highway merge, both SC 9 and SC 38 Bus. separate. SC 38 Bus. continues on Hamlet Highway heading north. The business route then reaches its northern terminus at a roundabout with its parent route SC 38.
