= South Carolina Highway 79 =

State highway in South Carolina

South Carolina Highway 79

Route information
- Maintained by SCDOT
- Length: 9.340 mi (15.031 km)
- Existed: 1938–present

Major junctions
- South end: SC 9 northwest of Bennettsville
- SC 38 north of Bennettsville; SC 385 near Boykin
- North end: NC 79 at the North Carolina state line in Gibson, NC

Location
- Country: United States
- State: South Carolina
- Counties: Marlboro

Highway system
- South Carolina State Highway System; Interstate; US; State; Scenic
← US 78	→ SC 80

South Carolina Highway 79 (SC 79) is a 9.340-mile (15.031 km) primary state highway in the U.S. state of South Carolina. It connects communities in western Marlboro County.

== Route description ==
SC 79 is a two-lane rural highway, traversing from SC 9 to the North Carolina state line where the road continues in Gibson, North Carolina as North Carolina Highway 79.

== History ==
Originally established in 1937 as a new primary route, it connected U.S. Route 78 (US 78) in Denmark, to Voorhees College. In 1938, it was replaced by SC 68, which later became a secondary road by 1948.

The current SC 79 was established in 1938 as a renumbering of part of SC 38, from Bennettsville to the North Carolina state line. Between 1967 and 1970, SC 79 was rerouted and replaced SC 383 to SC 9; the old alignment became SC 385.

=== South Carolina Highway 383 ===
South Carolina Highway 383
- Location: Near Bennettsville
- Length: 7.7 mi (12.4 km)
- Existed: 1937–1970

South Carolina Highway 383 (SC 383) was a state highway that was established by 1937 as new primary routing from SC 9 near Bennettsville to SC 79 near Boykin. It was renumbered as part of SC 79 by 1970.

== Major intersections ==
The entire route is in Marlboro County.

Location	mi	km	Destinations	Notes
	0.000	0.000	SC 9 – Bennettsville, Wallace	Southern terminus
	4.000	6.437	SC 38 – Bennettsville, Hamlet	
	7.840	12.617	SC 385 south – Bennettsville	Northern terminus of SC 385
			I-73	Proposed interchange
	9.340	15.031	NC 79 north – Gibson	Continuation into North Carolina
1.000 mi = 1.609 km; 1.000 km = 0.621 mi: Unopened
