= North Carolina Highway 38 =

State highway in Richmond County, North Carolina, US

North Carolina Highway 38
- Louis Breeden Boulevard

Route information
- Maintained by NCDOT
- Length: 5.524 mi (8.890 km)
- Existed: 1937–present

Major junctions
- South end: SC 38 at the South Carolina state line near Hamlet
- I-74 / US 74 near Hamlet
- North end: US 74 Bus. in Hamlet

Location
- Country: United States
- State: North Carolina
- Counties: Richmond

Highway system
- North Carolina Highway System; Interstate; US; State; Scenic
← NC 37	→ NC 39

North Carolina Highway 38 (NC 38) is a primary state highway in the U.S. state of North Carolina. It runs from South Carolina state line to the town of Hamlet.

== Route description ==
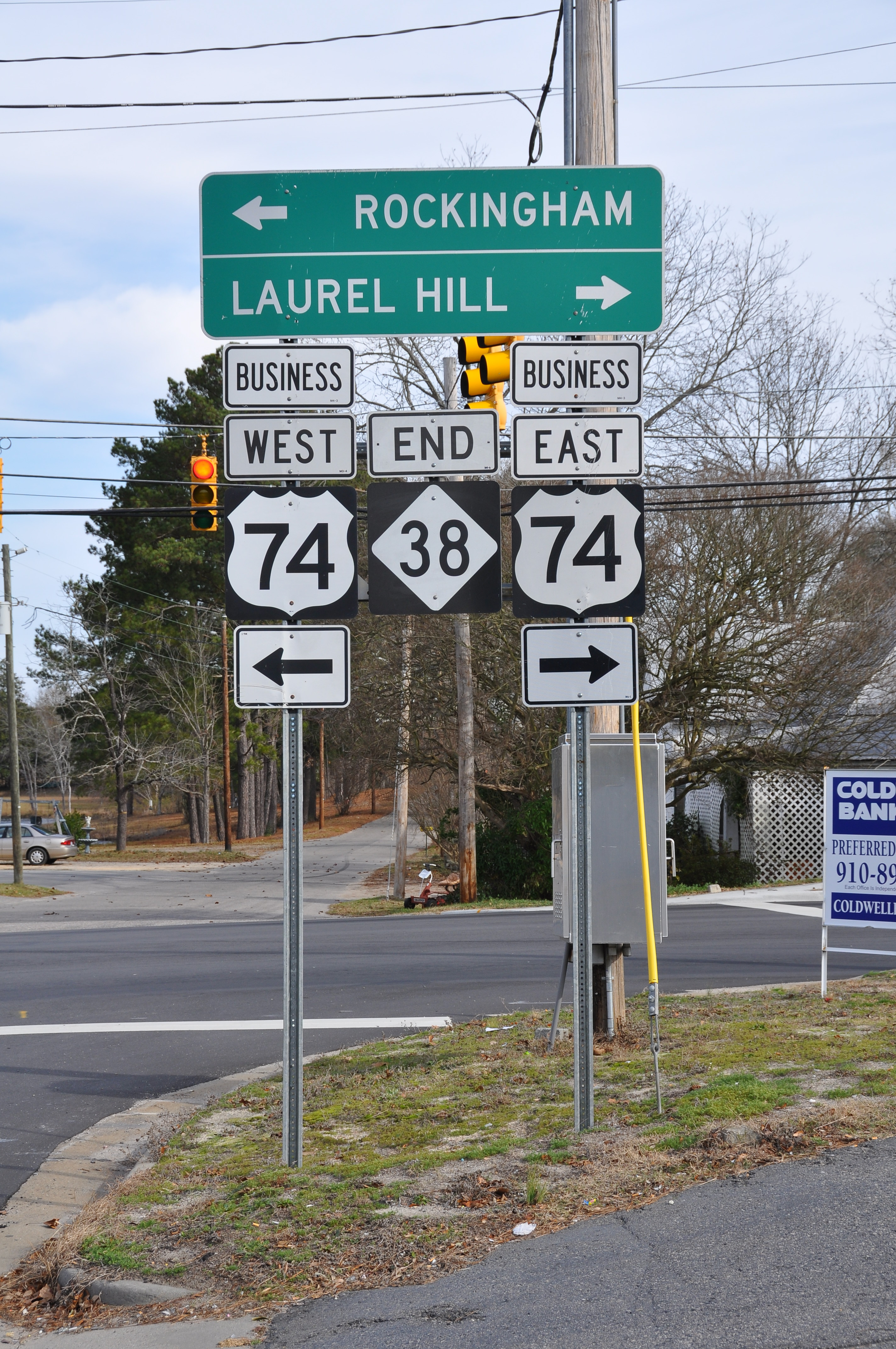
NC 38 end in Hamlet

A two-lane rural highway, it traverses 5.5 miles (8.9 km), begins at the South Carolina state line where the road itself continues south as South Carolina Highway 38. Heading north, NC 38 connects with U.S. Route 74 (US 74) which is also a segment of Interstate 74. Continuing north from the interchange, it heads into Hamlet, where it ends at US 74 Business. NC 38 is named in honor of Louis Breeden, a Hamlet-native and former professional American football player who played defensive back for the Cincinnati Bengals (1978-1987) in the National Football League.

== History ==
The first NC 38 was formed in 1934 to replace NC 301, it ran from US 17 in Folkstone to the New River. In 1937, NC 38 was renumbered NC 86. That same year, the current NC 38 was re-established as a renumbering of NC 771; which connected with the newly renumbered SC 38. NC 38 has not changed since.

=== North Carolina Highway 771 ===
North Carolina Highway 771
- Location: SC state line–Hamlet
- Length: 5.524 mi (8.890 km)
- Existed: 1936–1937

North Carolina Highway 771 (NC 771) first appeared as a new primary routing in 1930, traveling from US 311/NC 77, east of Winston-Salem, to US 421/NC 60, in Kernersville. In 1936, NC 771 was replaced by an extension of NC 150.

The second NC 771 was established as new primary routing in 1936, from Hamlet to the South Carolina state line, where it continued as SC 96. In 1937, both sides changed the number to 38.

== Major intersections ==
The entire route is in Richmond County.

Location	mi	km	Destinations	Notes
	0.0	0.0	SC 38 east – Bennettsville	
	3.6	5.8	I-74 / US 74 – Laurinburg, Rockingham	Exit 319 (US 74)
Hamlet	5.5	8.9	US 74 Bus. – Rockingham, Laurel Hill	
1.000 mi = 1.609 km; 1.000 km = 0.621 mi
