= Appin (disambiguation) =

Appin is a coastal district of the Scottish Highlands.

Appin may also refer to:

- Appin, New South Wales, Australia
- Appin, Ontario, Canada
- Appin (Bennettsville, South Carolina), listed on the U.S. National Register of Historic Places in South Carolina
- Appin (company) a former Indian cyberespionage company
- Kévin Appin (born 1998), Martiniquais footballer
