= South Carolina Highway 385 =

State highway in South Carolina, United States

South Carolina Highway 385

Route information
- Maintained by SCDOT
- Length: 11.730 mi (18.878 km)
- Existed: 1970–present

Major junctions
- South end: US 15 / US 401 near Bennettsville
- North end: SC 79 near Gibson, NC

Location
- Country: United States
- State: South Carolina
- Counties: Marlboro

Highway system
- South Carolina State Highway System; Interstate; US; State; Scenic
| ← I-385 | → SC 389 |

South Carolina Highway 385 (SC 385) is a 11.730-mile (18.878 km) primary state highway in the U.S. state of South Carolina. It connects the city of Bennettsville with northern Marlboro County.

== Route description ==
SC 385 is a two-lane (mostly) rural highway, traverses 11.7 miles (18.8 km) from Bennettsville north to SC 79, near the North Carolina state line.

== History ==
The first SC 385 appeared around 1941–42 as a new primary route from SC 341 to U.S. Route 15 (US 15)/SC 34. In 1948, it was downgraded to a secondary road.

The current SC 385 was established between 1968 and 1970 as a renumbering of SC 79 from US 15 Business (US 15 Bus.)/US 401 Bus. in Bennettsville to current SC 79. Around 1990, it was extended south, replacing US 15 Bus./US 401 Bus. through downtown Bennettsville to its current terminus at US 15/US 401.

== Junction list ==
The entire route is in Marlboro County.

| Location | mi | km | Destinations | Notes |
|---|---|---|---|---|
| | 0.000 | 0.000 | US 15 / US 401 – Society Hill, Hartsville, Darlington | Southern terminus |
| Bennettsville | 1.090 | 1.754 | SC 9 / SC 38 (Cottingham Boulevard) – Wallace, Hamlet | |
| Bennettsville | 1.790 | 2.881 | SC 9 Bus. north / SC 38 Bus. north (Cheraw Street) | Southern end of SC 9 Bus./SC 38 Bus. concurrency |
| Bennettsville | 1.930 | 3.106 | SC 9 Bus. south / SC 38 Bus. south (Broad Street) | Northern end of SC 9 Bus./SC 38 Bus. concurrency |
| Bennettsville | 2.450 | 3.943 | East Main Street east (SC 385 Conn. east) | Western terminus of SC 385 Conn.; SC 385 turns left onto North Cook Street. |
| | 11.730 | 18.878 | SC 79 – Gibson | Northern terminus |
1.000 mi = 1.609 km; 1.000 km = 0.621 mi: Concurrency terminus

== Bennettsville connector route ==
South Carolina Highway 385 Connector
- Location: Bennettsville
- Length: 1.060 mi (1.706 km)

South Carolina Highway 385 Connector (SC 385 Conn.) is a connector route that is nearly entirely within the eastern portion of Bennettsville. It follows East Main Street and Tyson Avenue and is an unsigned highway.

It begins at an intersection with the SC 385 mainline (known as North Cook Street north of here and also known as East Main Street west of here). It travels to the east-northeast on East Main Street, through a residential area of the city. At the northern terminus of Tyson Avenue, it turns right and travels to the south-southeast. Just before an intersection with Fayetteville Avenue, the highway begins to curve to the southeast. It crosses over two different railroad lines of Pee Dee River Railway. At the second set of railroad tracks, it leaves the city limits. A short distance later, it reaches its eastern terminus, an intersection with US 15/US 401/SC 9.

The entire route is in Marlboro County.

| Location | mi | km | Destinations | Notes |
|---|---|---|---|---|
| Bennettsville | 0.000 | 0.000 | SC 385 (East Main Street west / North Cook Street north) – City hall, Public library, Lake Paul Wallace | Western terminus; SC 385 and SC 385 Conn. share the East Main Street name. |
| | 1.060 | 1.706 | US 15 north / US 401 north / SC 9 north – Laurinburg SC 9 south – North Myrtle Beach, Dillon US 15 south / US 401 south – Cheraw, Darlington, Hartsville, Charlotte | Eastern terminus |
1.000 mi = 1.609 km; 1.000 km = 0.621 mi
