= Clio Historic District =

Historic district in South Carolina, United States

- U.S. National Register of Historic Places
- U.S. Historic district
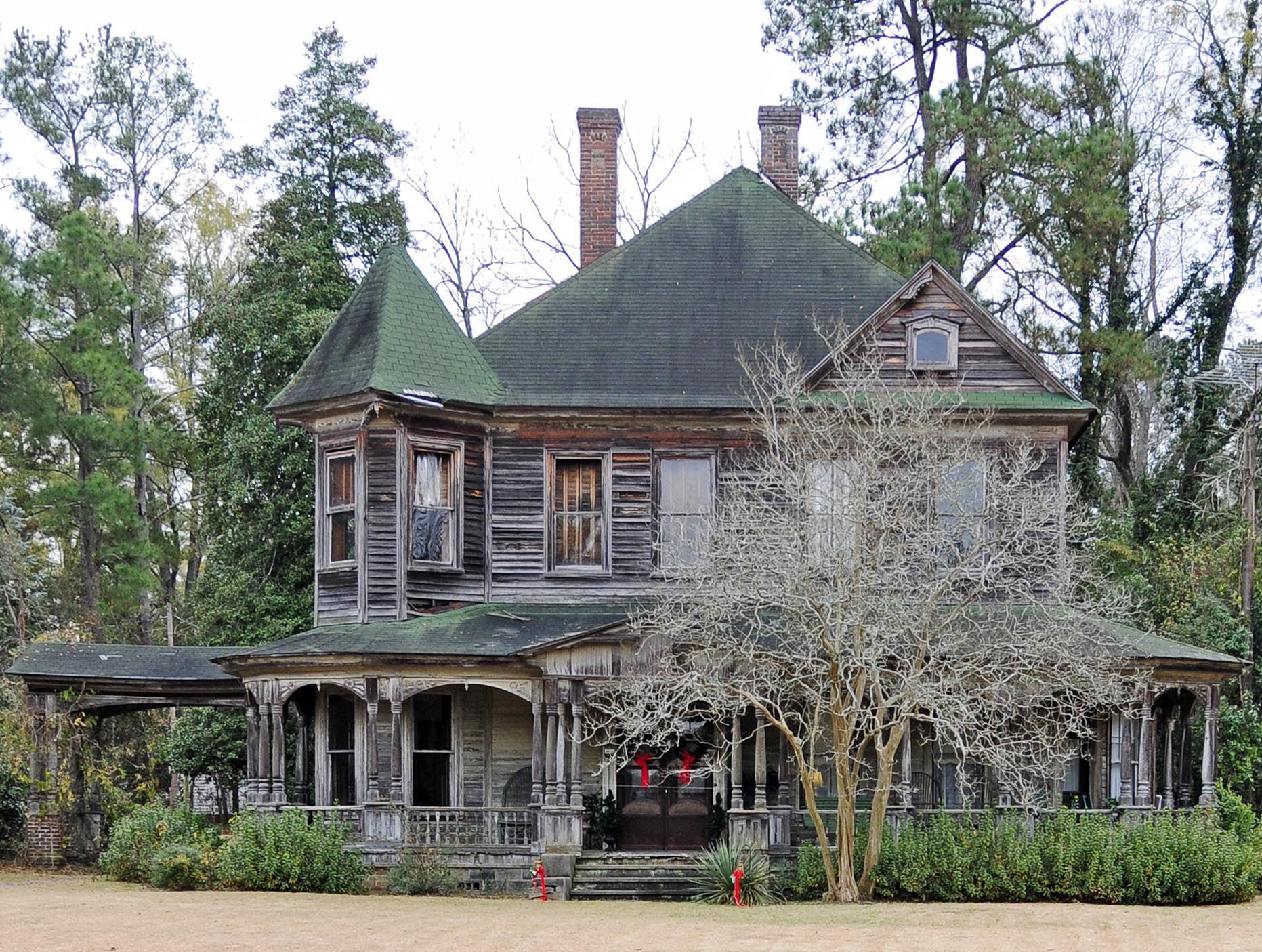
- Sternberger-Welch-Hamer House, Clio Historic District, December 2012

- Location within South Carolina Location within the United States
- Location: SC 9 and SC 381, Clio, South Carolina
- Coordinates: 34°34′45″N 79°32′49″W
- Area: 110 acres (45 ha)
- Built: 1925
- Architectural style: Colonial Revival, Classical Revival, Queen Anne
- NRHP reference No.: 79002388
- Added to NRHP: July 16, 1979

Clio Historic District is a national historic district located at Clio, Marlboro County, South Carolina. The district encompasses 132 contributing buildings in the town of Clio. It includes vernacular commercial, residential, and religious buildings built from about 1895 until about 1920. Design influences include the Queen Anne, Classical Revival, and Colonial Revival styles. Notable buildings include the Bennett-Sistare House, J.C. Covington House, Henry Bennett-Cheras House, Sternberger-Welch-Hamer House, Clio Baptist Church, Edens Opera House, and Bank of Clio.

It was listed on the National Register of Historic Places in 1979.
