= North Carolina Highway 83 =

State highway in Robeson County, North Carolina, US

North Carolina Highway 83

Route information
- Maintained by NCDOT
- Length: 7.285 mi (11.724 km)
- Existed: 1937–present

Major junctions
- South end: SC 83 at the South Carolina line near Red Bluff, SC
- US 501 near Raemon
- North end: NC 130 in Seven Bridges

Location
- Country: United States
- State: North Carolina
- Counties: Robeson

Highway system
- North Carolina Highway System; Interstate; US; State; Scenic
← NC 82	→ NC 84

North Carolina Highway 83 (NC 83) is a primary state highway in the U.S. state of North Carolina. It serves to connect the towns of Maxton and Clio, South Carolina.

== Route description ==
NC 83 is a two-lane 7.285-mile-long (11.724 km) rural highway that begins at the South Carolina state line and goes north to end at NC 130 in Seven Bridges. The highway is flanked by both farmland and swamps.

== History ==
NC 83 was established in 1937 as a new primary routing from US 501 to the South Carolina state line, where it continues as SC 83. In 1947, it was extended north to its current terminus at NC 130 in Seven Bridges.

== Major intersections ==
The entire route is in Robeson County.

Location	mi	km	Destinations	Notes
	0.0	0.0	SC 83 south – Clio	South Carolina state line
	5.0	8.0	US 501 – Rowland, Laurinburg	
Seven Bridges	7.3	11.7	NC 130 (Futura Lane) – Rowland, Maxton	
1.000 mi = 1.609 km; 1.000 km = 0.621 mi
