= Federal Correctional Institution, Bennettsville =

Federal prison in South Carolina, United States

FCI Bennettsville
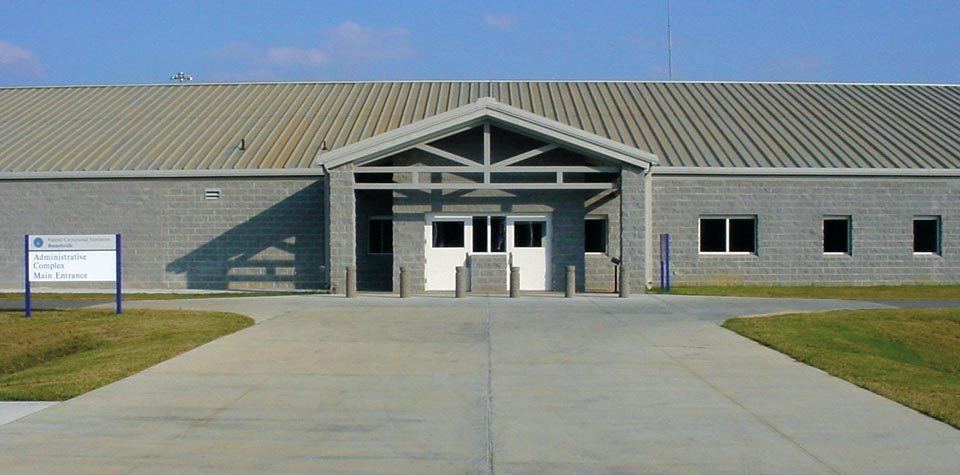
- Interactive map of FCI Bennettsville
- Location: Marlboro County, near Bennettsville, South Carolina; 34.6737°N 79.7245°W
- Status: Operational
- Security class: Medium-security (with minimum-security prison camp)
- Population: 1,875 (50 in camp)
- Opened: 2012
- Managed by: Federal Bureau of Prisons
- Warden: N, Barnes

The Federal Correctional Institution, Bennettsville (FCI Bennettsville) is a medium-security United States federal prison for male inmates in South Carolina. It is operated by the Federal Bureau of Prisons, a division of the United States Department of Justice. The facility also includes an adjacent prison camp for minimum-security male inmates.

FCI Bennettsville is located in northeast South Carolina, approximately 70 miles from Myrtle Beach and 100 miles from Columbia, the state capital.

== See also ==
- List of U.S. federal prisons
- Federal Bureau of Prisons
- Incarceration in the United States
