= South Carolina Highway 83 =

State highway in South Carolina, United States

South Carolina Highway 83

Route information
- Maintained by SCDOT
- Length: 4.820 mi (7.757 km)
- Existed: 1938–present

Major junctions
- South end: SC 381 near Clio
- North end: NC 83 at the North Carolina state line near Red Bluff

Location
- Country: United States
- State: South Carolina
- Counties: Marlboro

Highway system
- South Carolina State Highway System; Interstate; US; State; Scenic
← SC 81	→ I-85

South Carolina Highway 83 (SC 83) is a 4.820-mile (7.757 km) primary state highway in the U.S. state of South Carolina. It connects the communities of eastern Marlboro County with Maxton, North Carolina.

== Route description ==
SC 83 is a two-lane rural highway that traverses from a point northeast of Clio at SC 381 to the North Carolina state line where the road continues as North Carolina Highway 83 (NC 83).

== History ==
The highway was established in 1938 as a renumbering of SC 68 to match NC 83; no changes have been made since.

== Major intersections ==
The entire route is in Marlboro County.

Location	mi	km	Destinations	Notes
	0.000	0.000	SC 381 – Clio, McColl, Hamlet	
	4.820	7.757	NC 83 north – Maxton	North Carolina state line
1.000 mi = 1.609 km; 1.000 km = 0.621 mi
