= Bennettsville Historic District =

Historic district in South Carolina, United States

- U.S. National Register of Historic Places
- U.S. Historic district
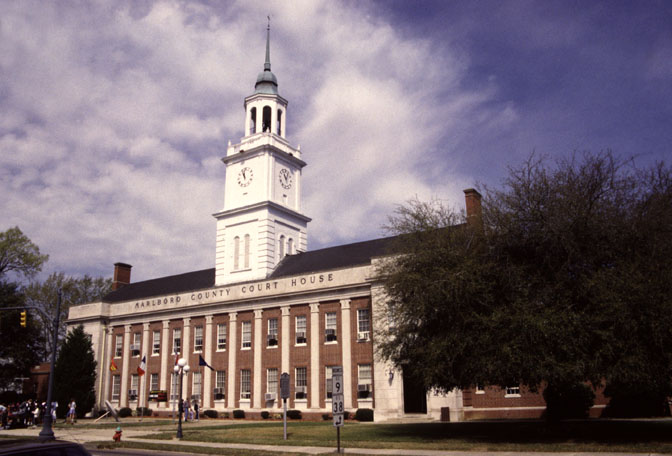
- The Marlboro County Courthouse, located within the district

- Location within South Carolina Location within the United States
- Location: Irregular pattern along Main St. from Everett to Lindsey and from Parsonage to Murchison (original) and Clyde St. between Main and Market Sts. (increase), Bennettsville, South Carolina
- Coordinates: 34°36′58″N 79°40′53″W
- Built: 1880 (original) and 1918 (increase)
- Architectural style: Beaux Arts, Queen Anne (original) and Classical Revival (increase)
- NRHP reference No.: 78002525 and 93000438
- Added to NRHP: April 20, 1978 (original); June 3, 1993 (increase)

The Bennettsville Historic District is a historic district in Bennettsville, South Carolina, United States that was listed on the National Register of Historic Places in 1978. The original area includes the Magnolia and Jennings-Brown houses, which are separately NRHP-listed. The NRHP-listed area was increased in 1993 to include the Playhouse Theater and other property along Clyde Street.
