= South Carolina Highway 912 =

US state highway

South Carolina Highway 912
- Willamette Road

Route information
- Maintained by SCDOT
- Length: 8.350 mi (13.438 km)

Major junctions
- South end: US 15 / US 401 near Bennettsville
- North end: SC 9 near Bennettsville

Location
- Country: United States
- State: South Carolina
- Counties: Marlboro

Highway system
- South Carolina State Highway System; Interstate; US; State; Scenic
← SC 909	→ SC 914

South Carolina Highway 912 (SC 912) is a 8.350-mile-long (13.438 km) state highway in the U.S. state of South Carolina. The highway travels through rural areas of Marlboro County. It functions like a western bypass of the city of Bennettsville.

== Route description ==
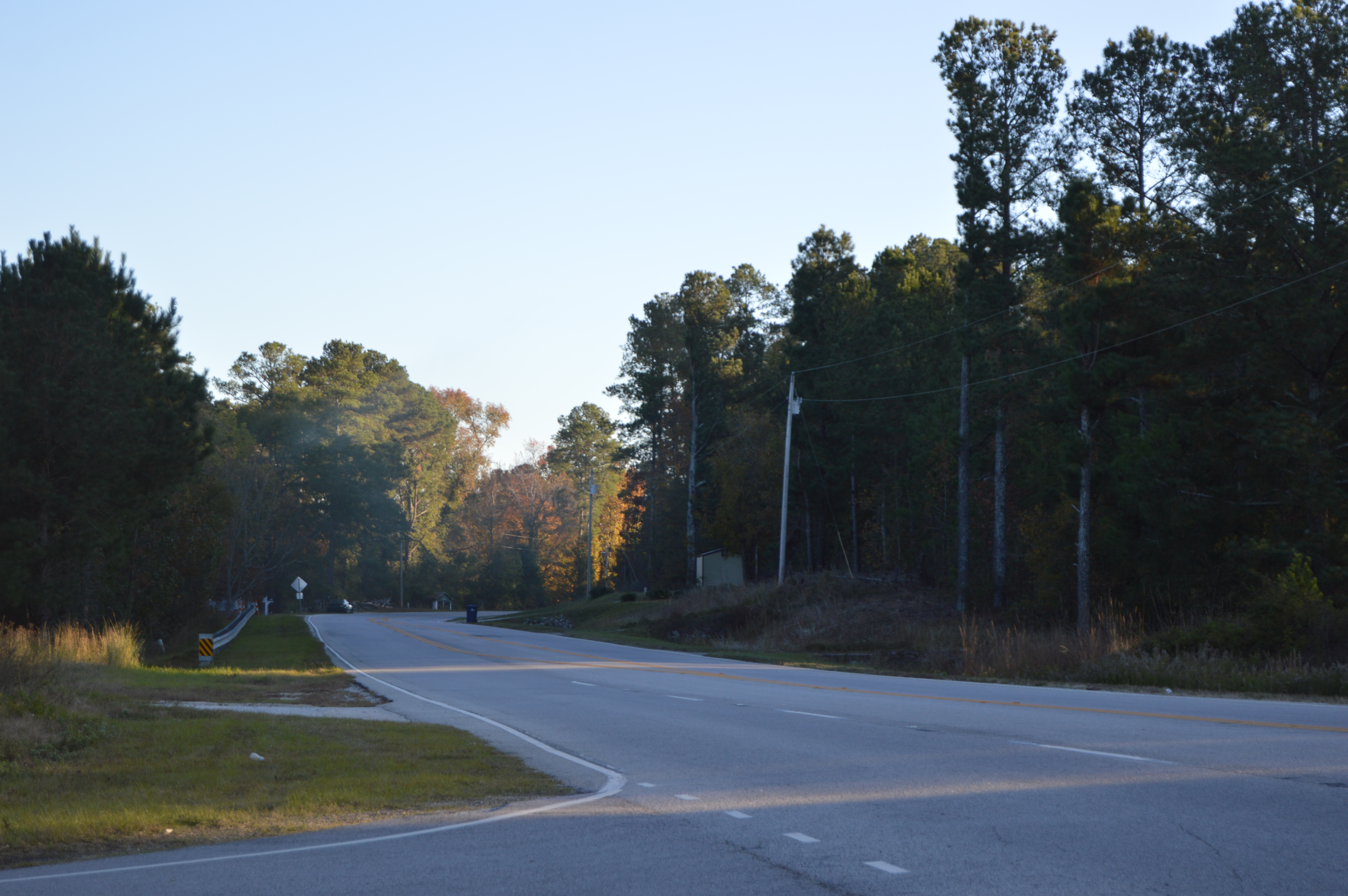
Northwest of Bennettsville

SC 912 begins at an intersection with U.S. Route 15 (US 15) and US 401 southwest of Bennettsville, Marlboro County, where the roadway continues as Marlboro Road. It travels to the west-northwest and begins curving to the northwest before crossing over Crooked Creek. It then curves to the north-northeast. SC 912 crosses over some railroad tracks before curving to the north-northwest. It crosses over Pledger Creek; this bridge is southwest of Becker Pond. Then, it curves to the north-northeast and the north. The highway curves to the north-northwest and travels just west of McLaurins Millpond. Just before Ridgeway Road, it curves to the north-northeast and meets its northern terminus, an intersection with SC 9 at a point northwest of Bennettsville.

== Major intersections ==
The entire route is in Marlboro County.

Location	mi	km	Destinations	Notes
	0.000	0.000	US 15 / US 401 – Bennettsville	Southern terminus
	8.350	13.438	SC 9 – Bennettsville, Cheraw	Northern terminus
1.000 mi = 1.609 km; 1.000 km = 0.621 mi
