= Oak Grove, Dillon County, South Carolina =

Oak Grove, South Carolina
- unincorporated community
- Location within South Carolina
- Coordinates: 34.352°N 79.543°W
- Country: United States
- State: South Carolina
- County: Dillon
- Elevation: 131 ft (40 m)
- Time zone: UTC-5 (Eastern (EST))
  - Summer (DST): UTC-4 (EDT)
- ZIP code: 29565
- Area codes: 843, 854
- GNIS feature ID: 1249906

Oak Grove is a populated place in Dillon County, South Carolina, United States.

== Geography ==
Drake is located at latitude 34.352 and longitude –79.543. The elevation is 131 feet.
