= Robertson-Easterling-McLaurin House =

Historic house in South Carolina, United States

- U.S. National Register of Historic Places
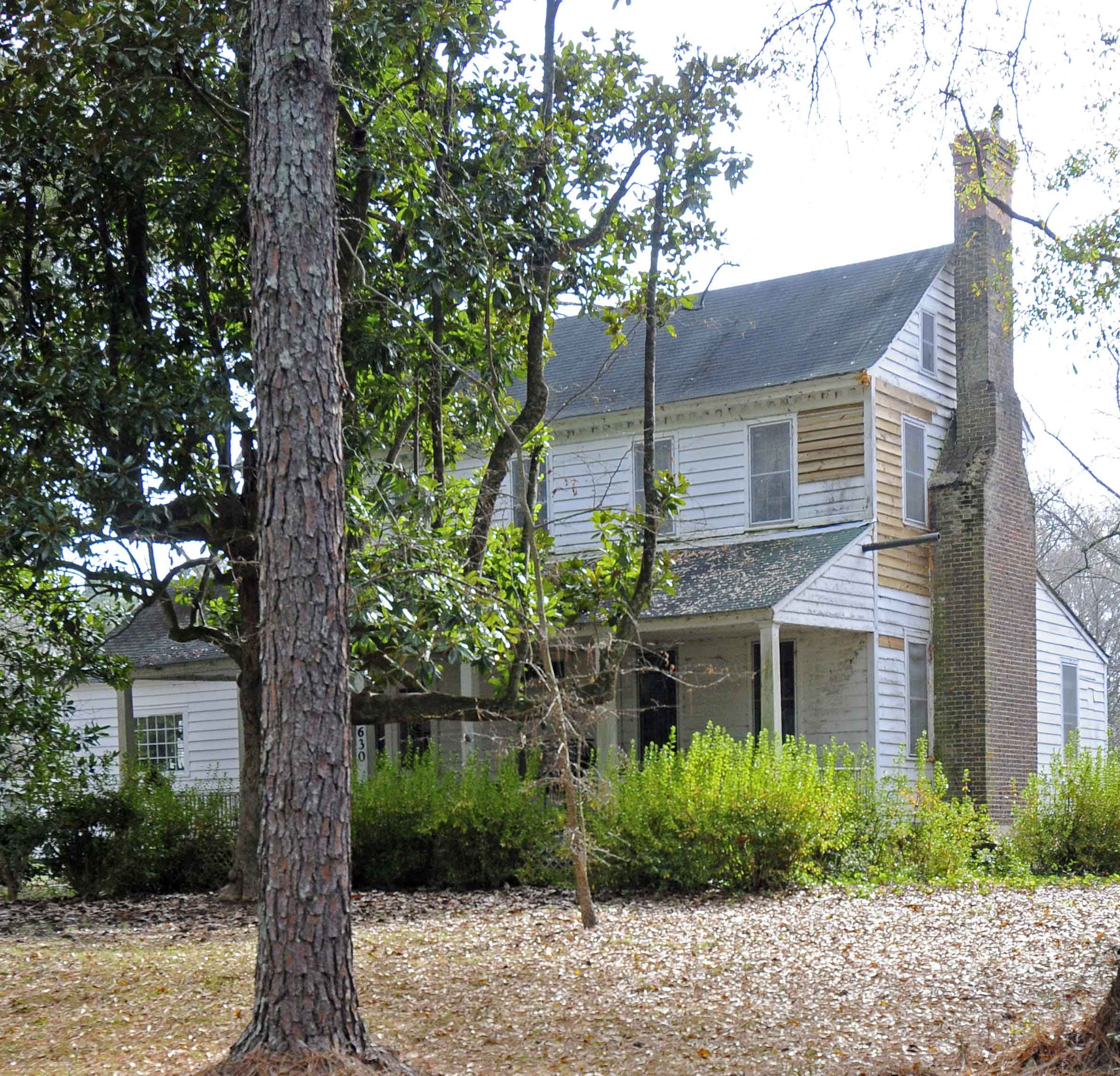
- Robertson-Easterling-McLaurin House, December 2012

- Location within South Carolina Location within the United States
- Location: W of Bennettsville off SC 912, near Bennettsville, South Carolina
- Coordinates: 34°40′33″N 79°45′22″W
- Area: 2.5 acres (1.0 ha)
- Built: c. 1790
- NRHP reference No.: 84002090
- Added to NRHP: April 5, 1984

Robertson-Easterling-McLaurin House is a historic home located near Bennettsville, Marlboro County, South Carolina. It was built about 1790, and is a 2 1/2-story, timber frame I-house dwelling. It has a brick pier foundation and exterior gable end chimneys. It was the home of John Lowndes McLaurin (1860-1934), a former United States Congressman and Senator in the early-20th century.

It was listed on the National Register of Historic Places in 1984.
