= Manship Farmstead =

- U.S. National Register of Historic Places
- U.S. Historic district
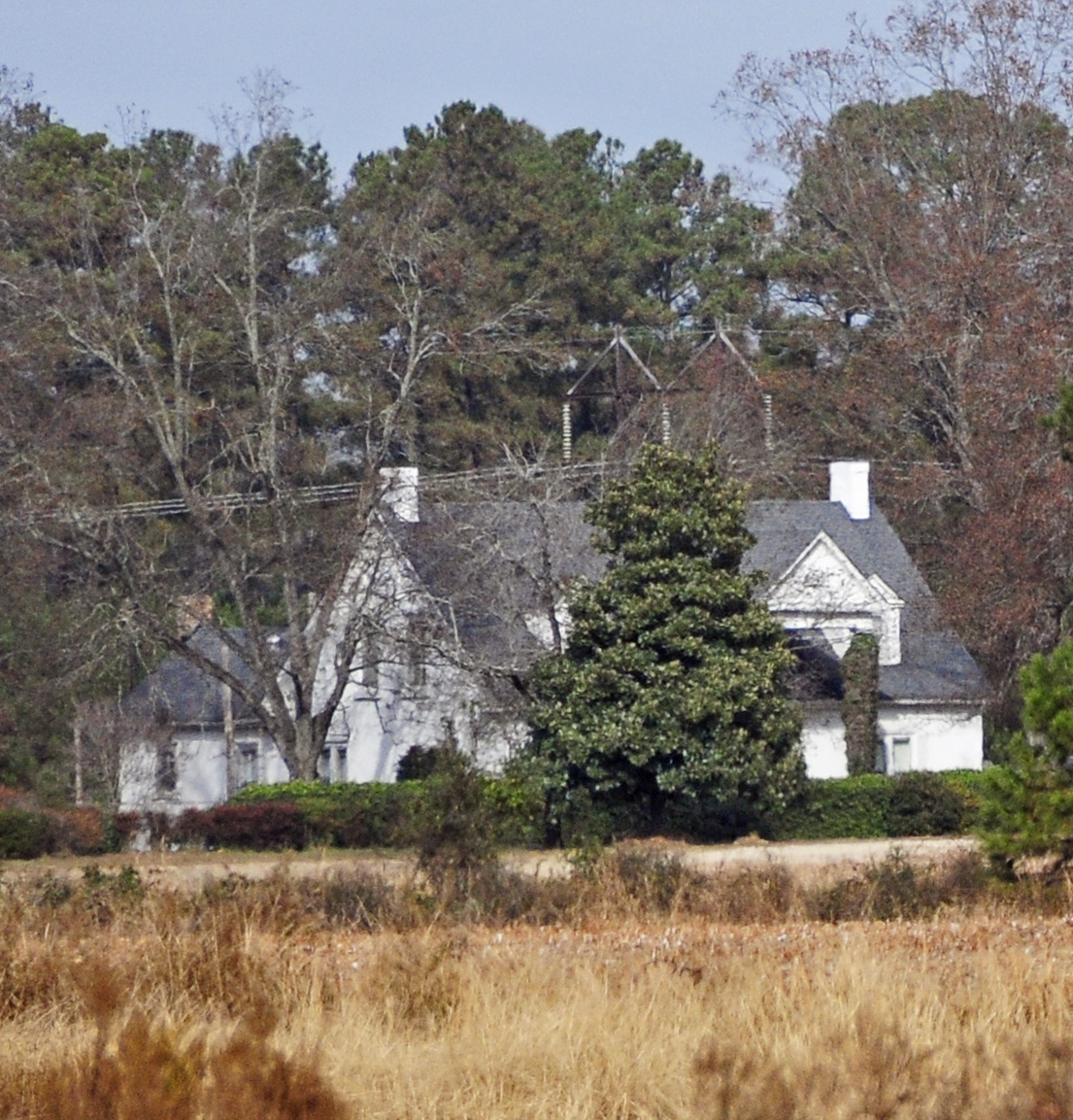
- Manship Farmstead, December 2012

- Location within South Carolina Location within the United States
- Nearest city: 2601 Manship Rd., near Tatum, South Carolina
- Coordinates: 34°39′31″N 79°35′46″W
- Area: 325 acres (132 ha)
- Built: 1906
- NRHP reference No.: 97000540
- Added to NRHP: June 4, 1997

Manship Farmstead is a historic farmstead and national historic district located near Tatum, Marlboro County, South Carolina. The district encompasses seven contributing buildings, one contributing site, and one contributing object in an early 20th century agricultural complex. They consist of the main house (1906), outbuildings (commissary/carriage house, warehouse, two barns, tobacco barn, tenant house, and well house), a farm bell, the Manship family cemetery, and associated historic rural landscape.

It was listed on the National Register of Historic Places in 1997.
