= McLaurin-Roper-McColl Farmstead =

Historic house in South Carolina, United States

- U.S. National Register of Historic Places
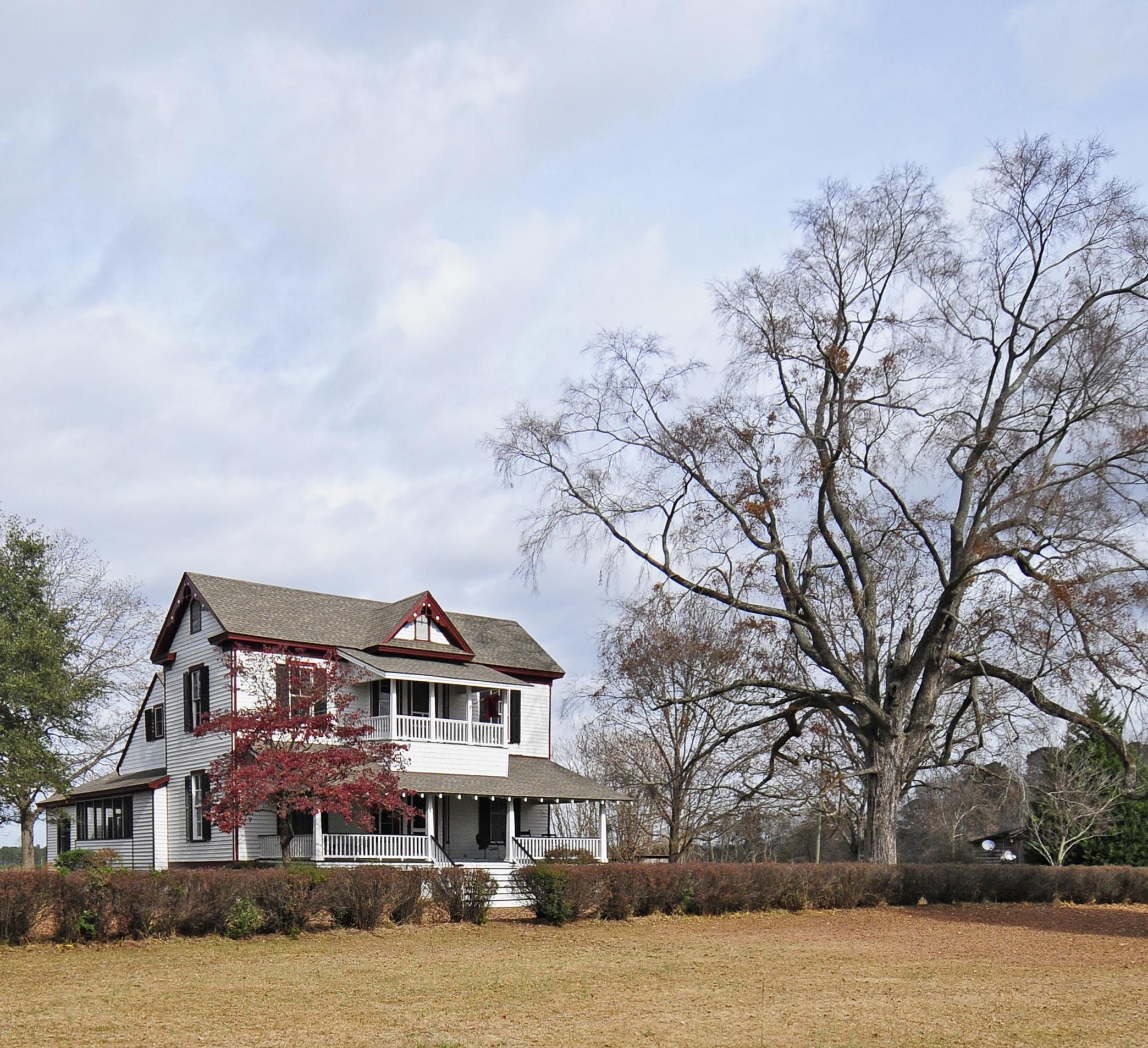
- McLaurin-Roper-McColl Farmstead, December 2012

- Location within South Carolina Location within the United States
- Location: 1104 Laurin Willis Rd., near Clio, South Carolina
- Coordinates: 34°36′59″N 79°33′52″W
- Area: 490 acres (200 ha)
- Built: c. 1826
- NRHP reference No.: 11001043
- Added to NRHP: January 20, 2012

McLaurin-Roper-McColl Farmstead, also known as Broad Oaks, is a historic home and farmstead located near Clio, Marlboro County, South Carolina. The original section of the house was built about 1826, as a four-bay side-gable cottage. Additions were made to the structure about 1850 and 1899, with American Craftsman style modifications made in the 1920s. Also on the property are an early outbuilding, African American cemetery, farm roads, and built landscape features such as drainage ditches.

It was listed on the National Register of Historic Places in 2012.
