= McLaurin House =

Historic house in South Carolina, United States

- U.S. National Register of Historic Places
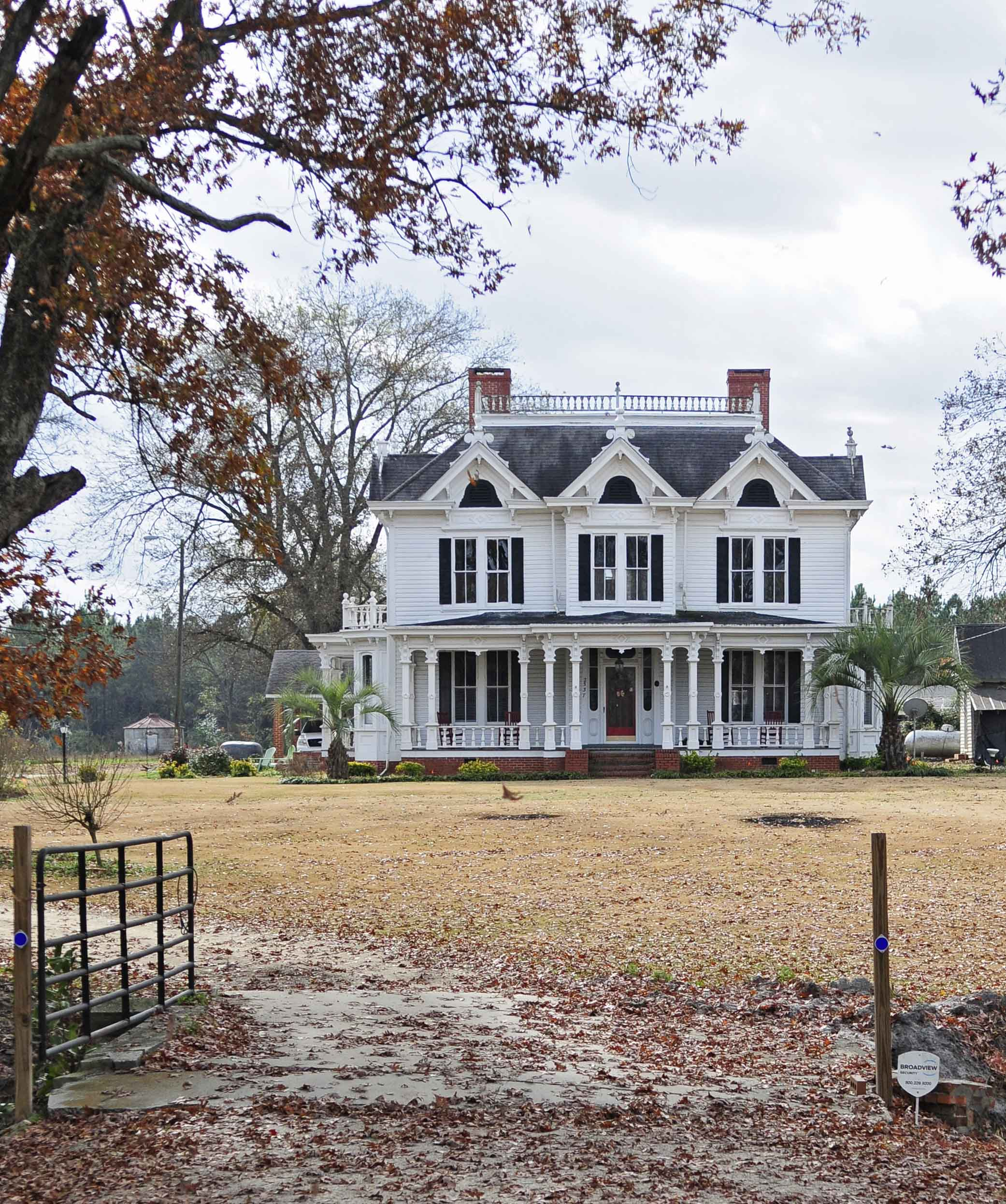
- McLaurin House, December 2012

- Location within South Carolina Location within the United States
- Location: East of Clio on South Carolina Highway 40, near Clio, South Carolina
- Coordinates: 34°35′0″N 79°31′58″W
- Area: 5.3 acres (2.1 ha)
- Built: c. 1880
- Architectural style: Italianate
- NRHP reference No.: 78002526
- Added to NRHP: March 24, 1978

McLaurin House, also known as the Lamar McLaurin House, is a historic home located near Clio, Marlboro County, South Carolina. It was built about 1880, and is a two-story clapboard Italianate style frame dwelling. It has a truncated hip roof with a balustraded deck. The front façade features a one-story porch with balustrade and decorative brackets. Also on the property are three contributing outbuildings.

It was listed on the National Register of Historic Places in 1978.
