= Bennett-Cheras House =

Coordinates: 34.58126°N 79.54175°W

The Bennett - Cheras House, constructed in about 1904 by Henry J. Bennett, is a historic house in Clio, South Carolina.

The house was built in the late Queen Anne style. The two and one-half story residence features a polygonal turret with a tent roof. A one-story encircling porch features coupled posts on masonry pedestals connected by a spindle frieze. Cross gables project over bays to break a massive hip roof on two sides. Also notable is the gingerbread ornamentation found on all façades.

The property was placed on the National Register of Historic Places by the U.S. Department of the Interior on July 16, 1979.
