= Scott Howell (political consultant) =

American political consultant

Herbert Weston Scott Howell III is an American entrepreneur and political media consultant whose client list includes former President George W. Bush, Senate Majority Leader John Thune - SD, US Senator Lindsey Graham, SC, US Senator Mike Rounds, SD and Gov Kristi Noem, SD. Other notable clients included Meg Whitman and Rudy Giuliani.

== Personal ==
Married in 1994, he and his wife Julie reside in the Dallas-Fort Worth area and have two children.

== Career ==
In a 2006 interview, Howell discussed his early career in some detail. Recruited by Lee Atwater to work for the RNC after his 1988 work for presidential candidate Bob Dole, Howell spent four years as a campaign operative before moving to Texas in 1992 to work for Karl Rove, then running a direct-mail firm. In 1993, Howell started his own political advertising consulting firm Scott Howell & Company. As of December 2020, SHC maintains a political presence but today is a more diversified with emphasis VR, Digital and other areas. See GrooveJones.com; PushDigital.com; FrothyBeardBrewing; Scott Howell and Company.

In 2004 he was part of the Bush/Cheney'04 strategy team producing ads for President Bush's successful reelection.

Howell has played a major role electing more than 20 US Senators and his campaign experience spans more than 40 states. Successful United States Senate campaigns for Republicans include:

- Jerry Moran of Kansas who defeated fellow Congressman Todd Tiahrt in a hotly contested primary in 2010
- John Thune of South Dakota, who defeated incumbent Senator Minority Leader Tom Daschle
- Tom Coburn of Oklahoma, who defeated Brad Carson
- Bob Corker of Tennessee, who defeated Harold Ford, Jr.
- Jim DeMint of South Carolina who defeated Inez Tennenbaum.
- Three senate campaigns for Lindsey Graham of South Carolina including the most expensive US Senate race in history in 2020.

Other notables races:

- Saxby Chambliss of Georgia
- Jim Talent of Missouri
- Norm Coleman of Minnesota in 2002
- Ron Johnson of Wisconsin in 2016
- Kristi Noem the first female governor of South Dakota in 2018

Howell has also been involved in more than a hundred congressional, legislative, judicial and issue campaigns. Noteworthy corporate clients have included American Airlines, Texas Rangers Baseball Club, the Dallas Cowboys and the Oil and Gas Industry.

Failed clients have included:

- George Allen, a United States Senator defeated in 2006 by Jim Webb
- Jerry Kilgore, defeated in 2005 by Tim Kaine in Virginia governor's race
- Rudy Giuliani who withdrew from the 2008 presidential primary season.
- Norm Coleman of Minnesota in 2008 who lost his reelection in a controversial recount after winning on election day.

== Notable campaigns ==
=== 2002 Georgia Senate Race ===
In 2002, Howell's client Saxby Chambliss defeated incumbent Senator Max Cleland. Supporters of Cleland blamed a Chambliss TV ad featuring the likenesses of Osama bin Laden and Saddam Hussein, while criticizing Cleland's votes against homeland security measures. The ad, which Cleland supporters claimed questioned the senator's patriotism, was removed after protests from prominent politicians including Republicans like John McCain and Chuck Hagel. Chambliss supporters claimed the ad didn't question Cleland's patriotism, but rather his judgment. Although these ads are frequently mentioned as examples of work by Scott Howell, Howell has repeatedly denied that he produced this particular ad.

=== 2006 Tennessee Senate Race ===
In October 2006, Howell was revealed as the producer, with Terry Nelson, of the "Harold, Call Me" attack ad used against democratic Tennessee Senatorial candidate Rep. Harold Ford Jr. in which a white woman said that she had met Ford at a Playboy party. The ad concludes with the woman speaking to the camera and saying to Ford "Call me."

Coverage of the controversy characterized Howell as a "protégé" of Karl Rove.
