= Jennings-Brown House =

Historic house in South Carolina, United States

- U.S. National Register of Historic Places
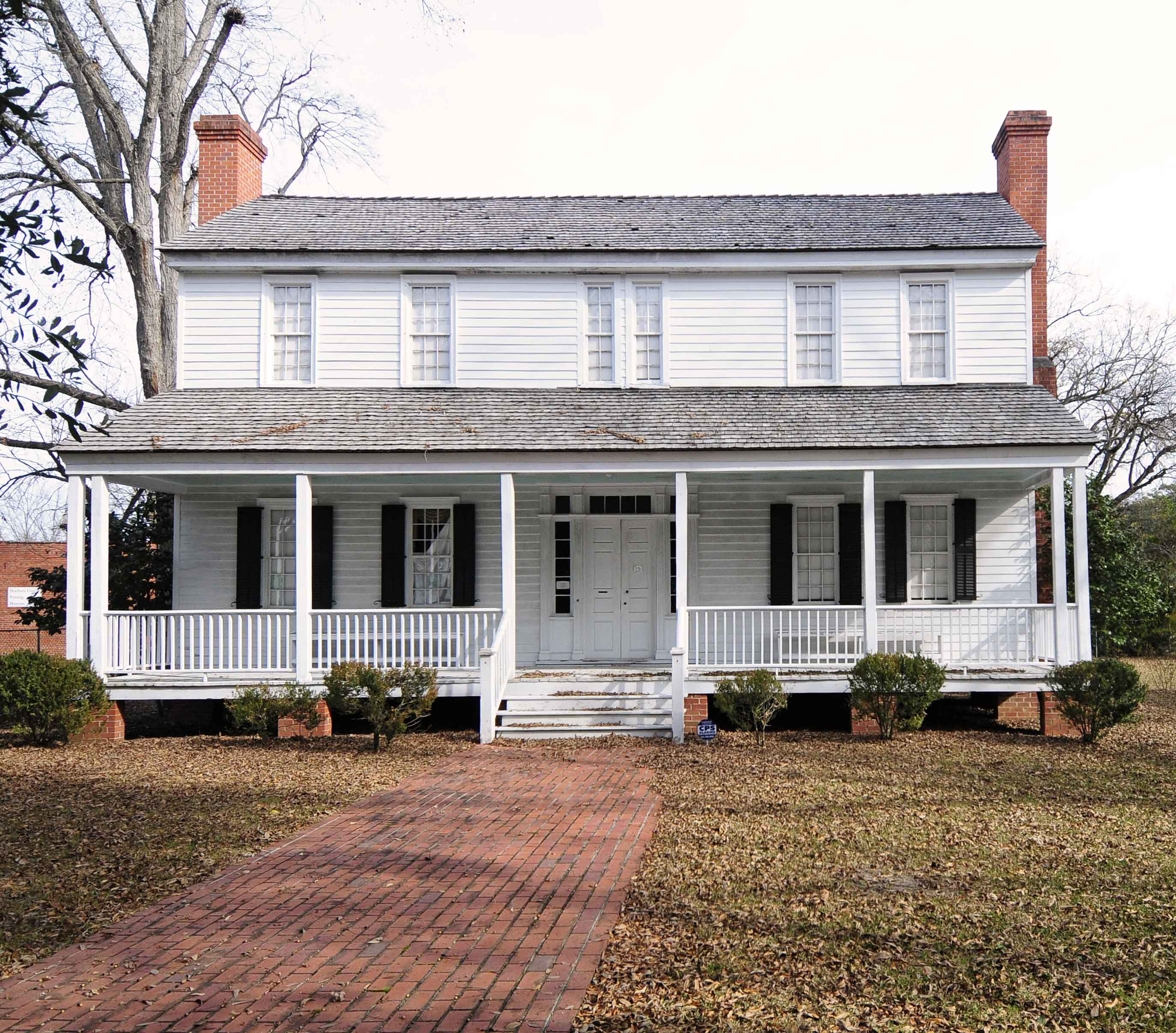
- Jennings-Brown House, December 2012

- Location within South Carolina Location within the United States
- Location: 121 S. Marlboro St., Bennettsville, South Carolina
- Coordinates: 34°36′5″N 79°40′55″W
- Area: 1 acre (0.40 ha)
- Built: c. 1830; 196 years ago
- NRHP reference No.: 72001215
- Added to NRHP: February 23, 1972

Jennings-Brown House is a historic home located at Bennettsville, Marlboro County, South Carolina. It was built about 1830, and is a two-story, frame dwelling with a full-width one-story front porch. It was one of the first houses built after Bennettsville became the Marlboro County seat in 1819. During the American Civil War, it served as headquarters for Major General Frank P. Blair, commanding general of the U.S.A. XVII Army Corps, which captured and occupied Bennettsville on March 6–7, 1865.

It was listed on the National Register of Historic Places in 1972.
