= Tatum, South Carolina =

- Town
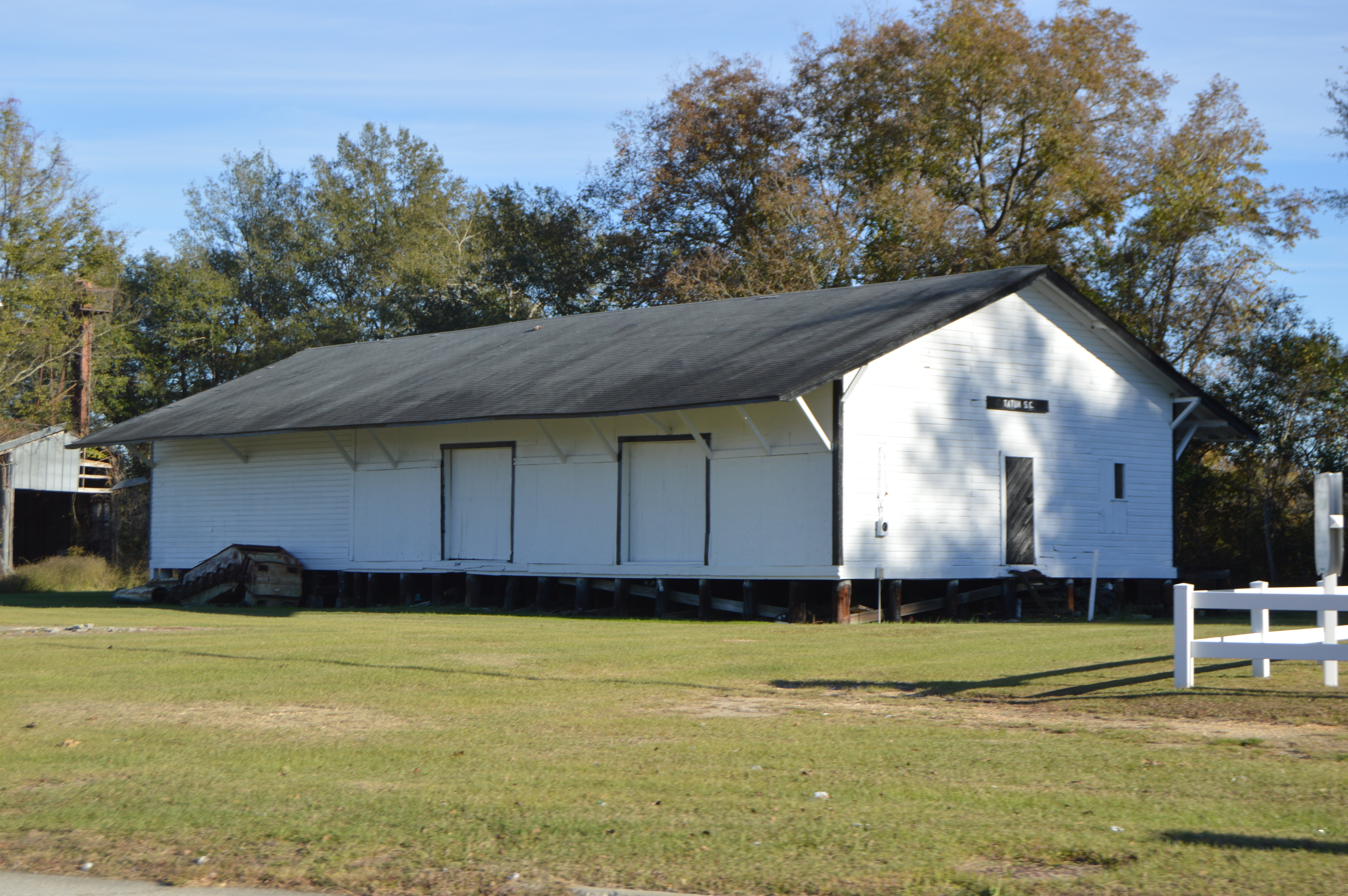
- Former train station on Main Street

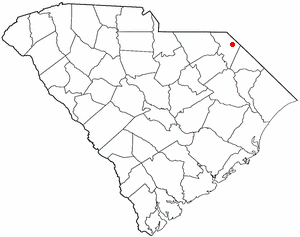
- Location of Tatum in South Carolina
- Coordinates: 34°38′38″N 79°35′12″W
- Country: United States
- State: South Carolina
- County: Marlboro

Area
  - Total: 0.91 sq mi (2.35 km^{2})
  - Land: 0.91 sq mi (2.35 km^{2})
  - Water: 0 sq mi (0.00 km^{2})
- Elevation: 197 ft (60 m)

Population (2020)
  - Total: 76
  - Density: 78.2/sq mi (30.21/km^{2})
- Time zone: UTC-5 (EST)
  - Summer (DST): UTC-4 (EDT)
- ZIP code: 29594
- Area codes: 843, 854
- FIPS code: 45-71305
- GNIS feature ID: 2406716
- Website: https://tatumsc.gov/

Tatum is a town in Marlboro County, South Carolina, United States. The population was 71 in 2023.

== History ==
The Manship Farmstead was listed on the National Register of Historic Places in 1997.

== Geography ==
According to the United States Census Bureau, the town has a total area of 0.9 square miles (2.3 km^{2}), all land.

== Demographics ==
Historical population
Census	Pop.	Note	%±
1900	200		—
1910	225		12.5%
1920	176		−21.8%
1930	186		5.7%
1940	181		−2.7%
1950	119		−34.3%
1960	132		10.9%
1970	115		−12.9%
1980	101		−12.2%
1990	49		−51.5%
2000	69		40.8%
2010	75		8.7%
2020	76		1.3%
U.S. Decennial Census

As of the census of 2000, there were 69 people, 32 households, and 19 families residing in the town. The population density was 78.1 inhabitants per square mile (30.2/km^{2}). There were 38 housing units at an average density of 43.0 per square mile (16.6/km^{2}). The racial makeup of the town was 75.36% White, 15.94% African American, 1.45% Native American, 4.35% from other races, and 2.90% from two or more races. Hispanic or Latino of any race were 4.35% of the population.

There were 32 households, out of which 28.1% had children under the age of 18 living with them, 43.8% were married couples living together, 12.5% had a female householder with no husband present, and 40.6% were non-families. 34.4% of all households were made up of individuals, and 18.8% had someone living alone who was 65 years of age or older. The average household size was 2.16 and the average family size was 2.79.

In the town, the population was spread out, with 24.6% under the age of 18, 5.8% from 18 to 24, 21.7% from 25 to 44, 24.6% from 45 to 64, and 23.2% who were 65 years of age or older. The median age was 41 years. For every 100 females there were 91.7 males. For every 100 females age 18 and over, there were 79.3 males.

The median income for a household in the town was $21,750, and the median income for a family was $30,000. Males had a median income of $27,500 versus $23,750 for females. The per capita income for the town was $17,926. There were 12.5% of families and 8.0% of the population living below the poverty line, including no under eighteens and 21.1% of those over 64.
