= Magnolia (Bennettsville, South Carolina) =

Historic house in South Carolina, United States

- U.S. National Register of Historic Places
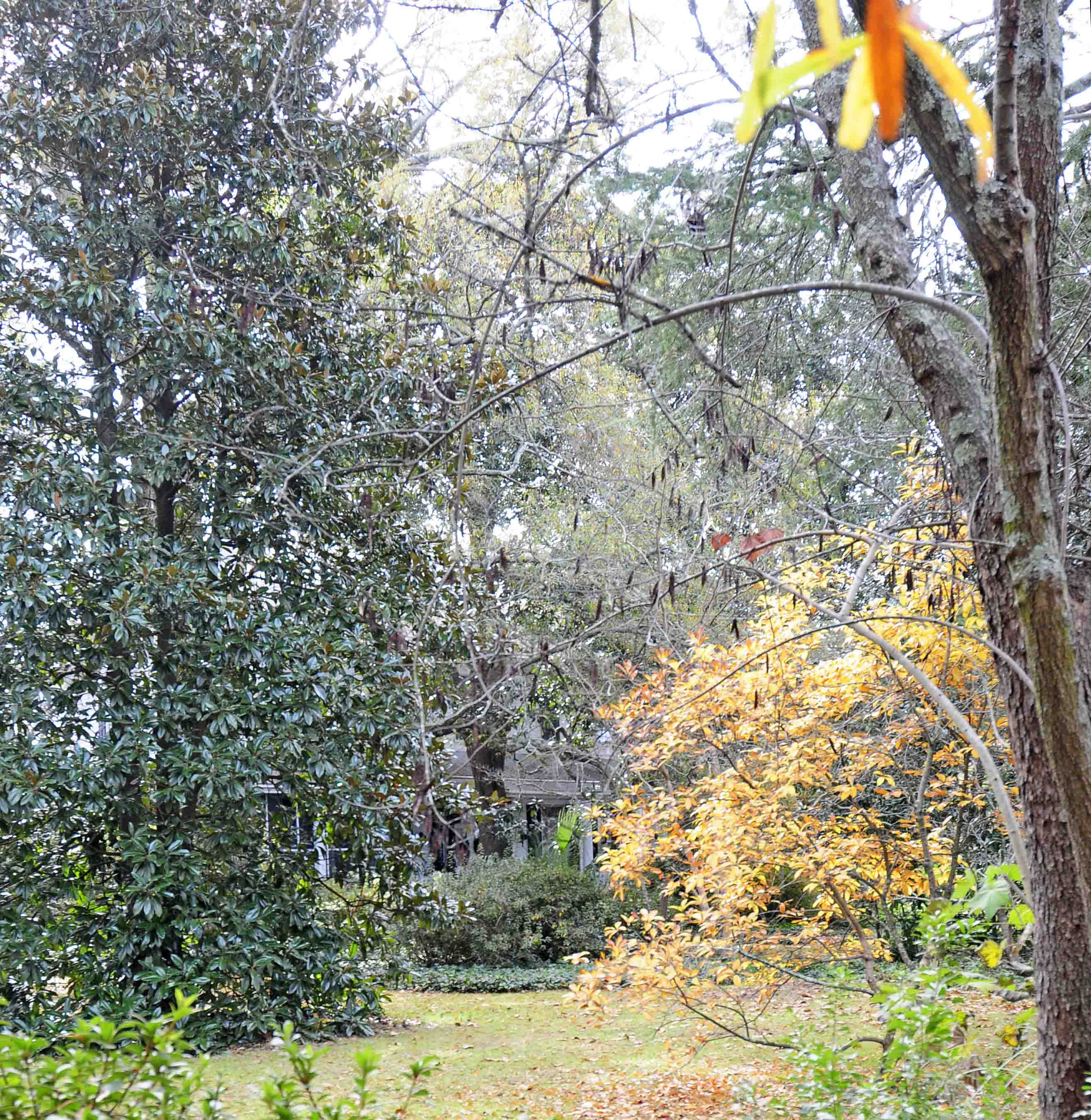

- Location within South Carolina Location within the United States
- Location: 508 E. Main Street; Bennettsville, South Carolina
- Coordinates: 34°37′10.8″N 79°40′37.9″W
- Area: 1 acre (0.40 ha)
- Built: 1853
- NRHP reference No.: 73001721
- Added to NRHP: March 14, 1973

Magnolia House, also known as the Johnson-Kinney House, located in Bennettsville, South Carolina, is a fine example of an excellently preserved late antebellum neoclassical, or "bracketed Greek Revival" home in rural South Carolina. Magnolia is a two-story frame house constructed in 1853 by Bennettsville lawyer, William Dalrymple Johnson. Johnson was a signer of the South Carolina Ordinance of Secession.

Notable details of the structure include a one-story porch supported by ten Doric columns, which extends along the northern exposure and front portion of the eastern side. Also, matching double leaf, five paneled doors are at the front and rear entrances, framed by rectangular transoms and sidelights with unusual rectangular pane design. Boxed cornices are bracketed all around. Behind the house are a barn and the old slave quarters, which were built around the year 1853.
