= Appin (Bennettsville, South Carolina) =

Historic house in South Carolina, United States

- U.S. National Register of Historic Places
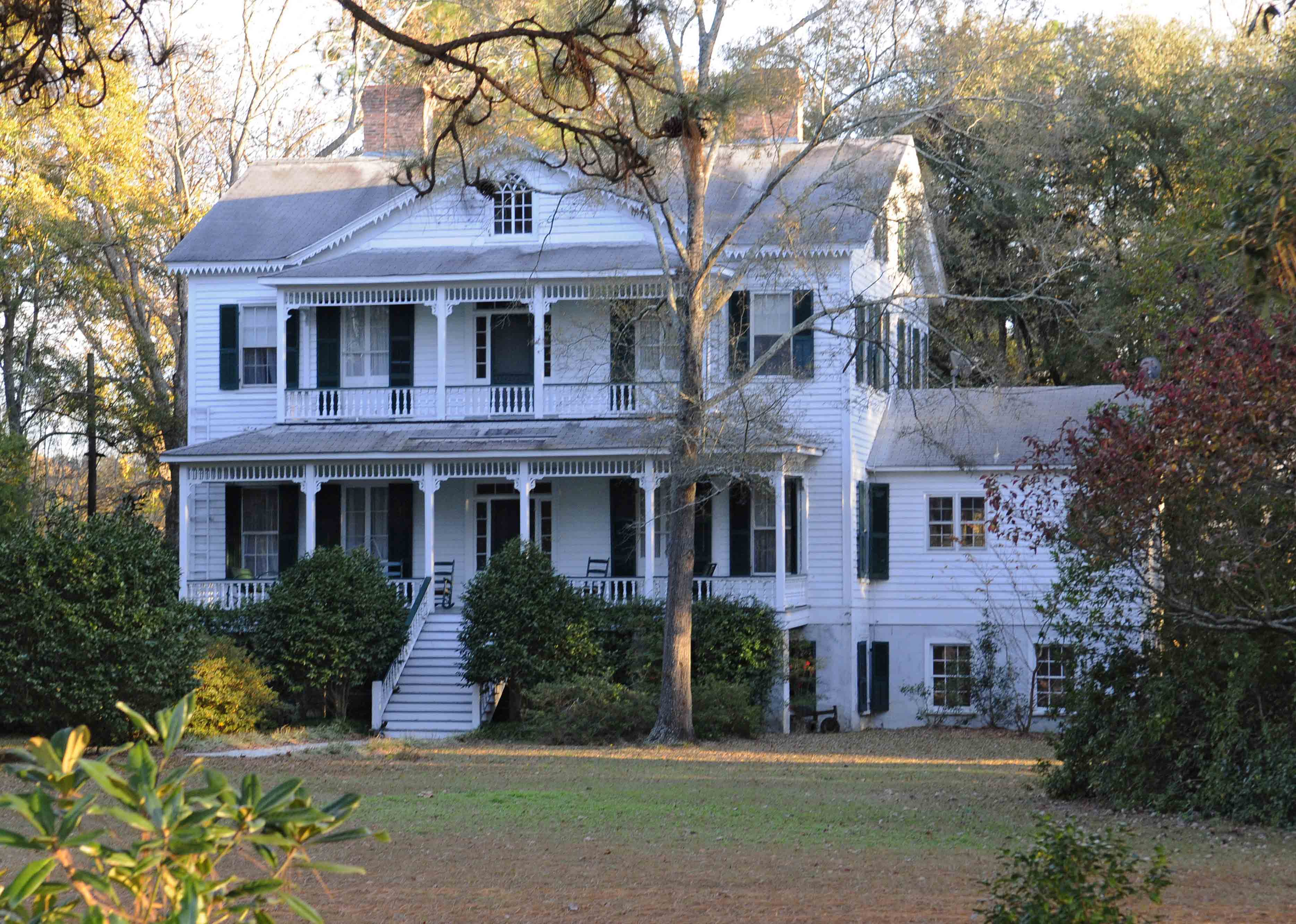
- Appin

- Location within South Carolina Location within the United States
- Nearest city: Bennettsville, South Carolina
- Coordinates: 34°36′18″N 79°43′3″W
- Built: 1875 (original); 1870 (increase)
- Architectural style: Neoclassical
- NRHP reference No.: 82003894 and 07001044
- Added to NRHP: June 28, 1982 (original); October 3, 2007 (increase)

Appin is a historic home near Bennettsville, South Carolina that dates from 1875. The boundaries of the listed property were increased to include more, perhaps outbuildings or secondary structures, dating from 1870, in 2007 It is a two-story farmhouse associated with its second owner, Charles Spencer McCall. He was a veteran of the Civil War, a local business man, mayor of Bennettsville, and member of the South Carolina Senate.

It was listed on the National Register of Historic Places in 1982.
