= Bennettsville, South Carolina =

- City
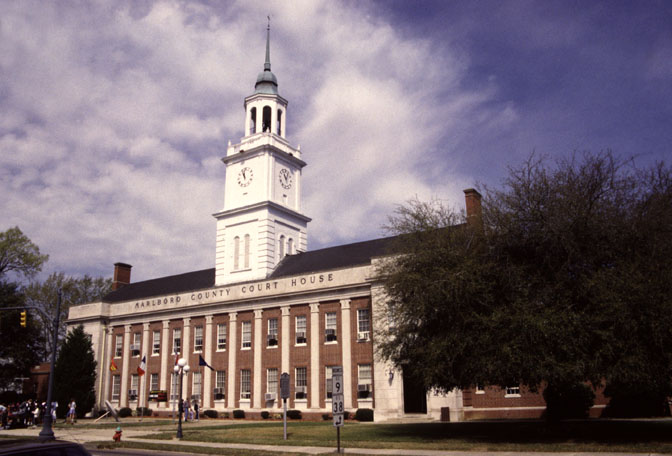
- Marlboro County Courthouse

- Seal

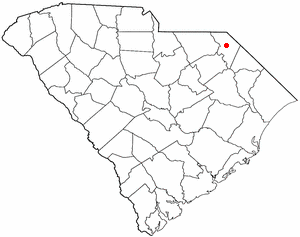
- Location of Bennettsville in South Carolina
- Coordinates: 34°37′17″N 79°41′15″W
- Country: United States
- State: South Carolina
- County: Marlboro

Area
  - Total: 6.81 sq mi (17.64 km^{2})
  - Land: 6.18 sq mi (16.00 km^{2})
  - Water: 0.63 sq mi (1.64 km^{2})
- Elevation: 141 ft (43 m)

Population (2020)
  - Total: 7,020
  - Density: 1,136.6/sq mi (438.86/km^{2})
- Time zone: UTC−5 (EST)
  - Summer (DST): UTC−4 (EDT)
- ZIP Code: 29512
- Area codes: 843, 854
- FIPS code: 45-05680
- GNIS feature ID: 2403854
- Website: www.bennettsvillesc.com

Bennettsville is a city located in the U.S. state of South Carolina on the Great Pee Dee River. As the county seat of Marlboro County, Bennettsville is noted for its historic homes and buildings from the 19th and early 20th centuries—including the Bennettsville Historic District which is listed on the National Register of Historic Places.

As of the 2020 census, Bennettsville had a population of 7,020.

== Geography ==
According to the United States Census Bureau, the city has a total area of 6.2 square miles (16 km^{2}), of which 5.6 square miles (15 km^{2}) is land and 0.6 square miles (1.6 km^{2}) (10.13%) is water.

== History ==
The city of Bennettsville was founded in 1819 on the Great Pee Dee River and named after Thomas Bennett, Jr., then governor of South Carolina. The area was developed for short-staple cotton cultivation, dependent on the labor of enslaved African Americans. Many were brought to the upland area from the Lowcountry, carrying their Gullah culture with them. Others were transported from the Upper South by slave traders. This shift to cotton cultivation in the uplands was based on the development of the cotton gin, which made short-staple cotton, cotton with relatively short fibers, profitable. The advent of the gin in turn led to development of large cotton plantations throughout the Deep South.

In the same year, the S.C. General Assembly authorized the relocation of the courthouse from the eastern bank of the Great Pee Dee River to a more central location, selecting a 3-acre (12,000 m^{2}) apple orchard located on a bluff above Crooked Creek. The new courthouse was designed by South Carolina architect Robert Mills. Streets were developed radiating from the courthouse square, one of the state's largest. In 1852, the Mills building was replaced.

In 1865 during the last year of the Civil War, the city was occupied by Union troops. During this time, the Jennings-Brown House and the first County Courthouse were used as the headquarters for General William T. Sherman. The new courthouse escaped burning. This is one of the few county seats that has preserved records dating to 1785; they are available for genealogical research.

In 1884, another Second Empire-style courthouse was built on the site. In 1952-1954 it was later enlarged with additions, and the 1884 portion constitutes the central portion of the current building. Additions included two-story red brick wings and the present clock steeple, all designed by Bennettsville architect Henry D. Harrall.

In 1885, Duncan Donald McColl financed development of the first railroad, bank and textile mills in Bennettsville, stimulating the economy as the town was connected to other markets and built an industry. The economy boomed during this "king cotton" era. The city became the center of one of the richest agricultural areas in the state. In the 20th century, the State of South Carolina designated Bennettsville as one its first "G.R.E.A.T. Towns" (Governor's Rural Economic Achievement Trophy).

== Registered historic sites ==
Buildings and districts listed on the National Register of Historic Places include Appin, the Bennettsville Historic District, Jennings-Brown House, Magnolia, Robertson-Easterling-McLaurin House, and the nearby Welsh Neck-Long Bluff-Society Hill Historic District.

The Bennettsville Historic District was designated and is listed on the National Register of Historic Places in 1978. Its contributing buildings include the Jennings-Brown House (1826), the Female Academy (1830), the Medical Museum (1902), and the Murchison School (1902), as well as other residences in the Queen Anne and Beaux Arts style.

== Facilities ==
In the 21st century, a new Marlboro County library was constructed. Named in honor of national activist Marian Wright Edelman, who was born and grew up in Bennettsville, it opened on February 22, 2010. She founded the Children's Defense Fund, to promote programs for children and mothers.

The library is located on 4.4 acres (18,000 m^{2}) at the intersection of Marlboro Street and Fayetteville Avenue adjacent to the Murchison building (1902) and is a new single-story building with approximately 20,000 square feet (1,900 m^{2}). Its front tower is oriented on axis with that of the Murchison Building. The building's cost was supported by $1.325 million in federal funding. The Library holds 60,000 volumes and has two conference rooms, seating 50 and 12.

== Economy ==
The county is still largely rural, with limited job opportunities. The county seat serves as a trading center for the county.

The Federal Correctional Institution, Bennettsville was built outside of the city in the county. It is a medium-security prison for male prisoners, and has an associated minimum-security camp holding 139 prisoners. Together the facility houses 1776 prisoners.

== Demographics ==
Historical population
Census	Pop.	Note	%±
1880	343		—
1890	978		185.1%
1900	1,929		97.2%
1910	2,646		37.2%
1920	3,197		20.8%
1930	3,667		14.7%
1940	4,895		33.5%
1950	5,140		5.0%
1960	6,963		35.5%
1970	7,468		7.3%
1980	8,774		17.5%
1990	9,345		6.5%
2000	9,425		0.9%
2010	9,069		−3.8%
2020	7,020		−22.6%
U.S. Decennial Census

=== 2020 census ===
As of the 2020 census, Bennettsville had a population of 7,020. The median age was 43.2 years. 21.4% of residents were under the age of 18 and 21.1% of residents were 65 years of age or older. For every 100 females there were 84.4 males, and for every 100 females age 18 and over there were 81.1 males age 18 and over.

97.8% of residents lived in urban areas, while 2.2% lived in rural areas.

There were 2,965 households in Bennettsville, of which 28.4% had children under the age of 18 living in them. Of all households, 26.5% were married-couple households, 19.4% were households with a male householder and no spouse or partner present, and 48.1% were households with a female householder and no spouse or partner present. About 37.3% of all households were made up of individuals and 16.9% had someone living alone who was 65 years of age or older.

There were 3,591 housing units, of which 17.4% were vacant. The homeowner vacancy rate was 3.1% and the rental vacancy rate was 11.4%.

Racial composition as of the 2020 census
Race	Number	Percent
White	2,119	30.2%
Black or African American	4,555	64.9%
American Indian and Alaska Native	46	0.7%
Asian	56	0.8%
Native Hawaiian and Other Pacific Islander	3	0.0%
Some other race	34	0.5%
Two or more races	207	2.9%
Hispanic or Latino (of any race)	92	1.3%

=== 2000 census ===
As of the census of 2000, there were 9,425 people, 3,289 households, and 2,167 families residing in the city. The population density was 1,686.2 inhabitants per square mile (651.0/km^{2}). There were 3,775 housing units at an average density of 675.4 per square mile (260.8/km^{2}). The racial makeup of the city was 63.15% African American, 34.80% White, 0.85% Native American, 0.50% Asian, 0.11% from other races, and 0.59% from two or more races. Hispanic or Latino of any race were 0.63% of the population.

There were 3,289 households, out of which 29.5% had children under the age of 18 living with them, 35.7% were married couples living together, 25.4% had a female householder with no husband present, and 34.1% were non-families. 31.5% of all households were made up of individuals, and 14.2% had someone living alone who was 65 years of age or older. The average household size was 2.43 and the average family size was 3.06.

In the city, the population was spread out, with 23.1% under the age of 18, 10.5% from 18 to 24, 31.2% from 25 to 44, 20.8% from 45 to 64, and 14.5% who were 65 years of age or older. The median age was 36 years. For every 100 females, there were 107.6 males. For every 100 females age 18 and over, there were 110.6 males.

The median income for a household in the city was $22,389, and the median income for a family was $29,272. Males had a median income of $24,697 versus $21,054 for females. The per capita income for the city was $13,917. About 22.0% of families and 27.2% of the population were below the poverty line, including 39.2% of those under age 18 and 22.1% of those age 65 or over.

Bennettsville is the center of an urban cluster with a total population of 12,070 (2000 census).

== Government ==
The city is run by an elected Mayor-council government system. The city administrator is appointed by the city council and serves as the chief executive officer to carry out policies and oversee the daily business of the city. As of 2026, the mayor is Tyron Abraham.

== Education ==
- Bennettsville has a lending library, the Marian Wright Edelman Public Library.
- Marlboro County High School
- Marlboro Academy

== Notable people ==
- Aziz Ansari, comedian and actor
- Bryan Blair, athletic director
- Thomas Carey (baritone), American operatic baritone
- Marian Wright Edelman, founder of the Children's Defense Fund
- Scott Howell, American political consultant
- Hugh McColl, retired CEO of Bank of America
- Cozell McQueen, Starting Center on 1983 NC State NCAA Championship Team
- Jim Odom, MLB umpire
- Claudius E. Watts III US Air Force lieutenant general
- Chancellor Williams, historian, writer and educator
- Mike Wright, pitcher for Seattle Mariners
