= Clio, South Carolina =

- Town
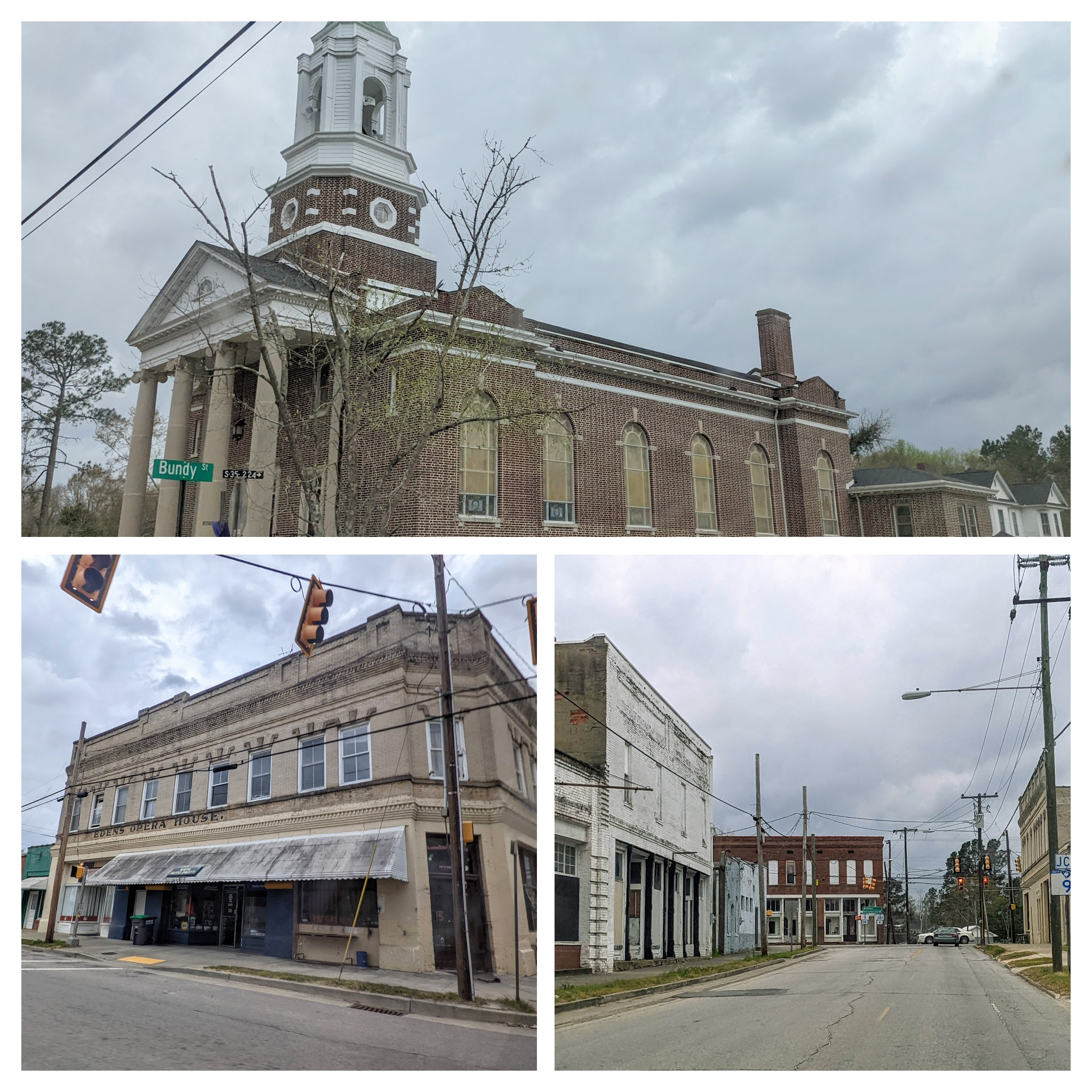
- Street scenes in Clio

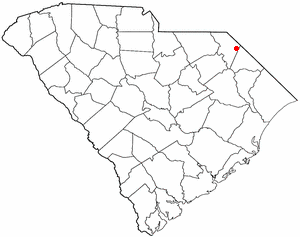
- Location of Clio in South Carolina
- Coordinates: 34°34′45″N 79°32′46″W
- Country: United States
- State: South Carolina
- County: Marlboro

Area
  - Total: 0.86 sq mi (2.22 km^{2})
  - Land: 0.86 sq mi (2.22 km^{2})
  - Water: 0 sq mi (0.00 km^{2})
- Elevation: 194 ft (59 m)

Population (2020)
  - Total: 608
  - Density: 710.2/sq mi (274.21/km^{2})
- Time zone: UTC-5 (Eastern (EST))
  - Summer (DST): UTC-4 (EDT)
- ZIP code: 29525
- Area codes: 843, 854
- FIPS code: 45-15310
- GNIS feature ID: 2406281
- Website: www.cliosc.com

Clio (pronounced CLY-oh) is a town in Marlboro County, South Carolina, United States. As of the 2020 census, Clio had a population of 608. Marlboro School of Discovery was a magnet school in Clio, South Carolina and was part of the Marlboro County School District.

== History ==
The Clio Historic District, McLaurin House, and McLaurin-Roper-McColl Farmstead are listed on the National Register of Historic Places.

== Geography ==
According to the United States Census Bureau, the town has a total area of 0.8 square miles (2.1 km^{2}), all land.

== Demographics ==
Historical population
Census	Pop.	Note	%±
1900	508		—
1910	780		53.5%
1920	1,009		29.4%
1930	808		−19.9%
1940	821		1.6%
1950	837		1.9%
1960	847		1.2%
1970	936		10.5%
1980	1,031		10.1%
1990	882		−14.5%
2000	774		−12.2%
2010	726		−6.2%
2020	608		−16.3%
U.S. Decennial Census

Clio town, South Carolina – Racial and ethnic composition Note: the US Census treats Hispanic/Latino as an ethnic category. This table excludes Latinos from the racial categories and assigns them to a separate category. Hispanics/Latinos may be of any race.
Race / Ethnicity (NH = Non-Hispanic)	Pop 2000	Pop 2010	Pop 2020	% 2000	% 2010	% 2020
White alone (NH)	278	191	141	35.92%	26.31%	23.19%
Black or African American alone (NH)	441	466	417	56.98%	64.19%	68.59%
Native American or Alaska Native alone (NH)	47	55	31	6.07%	7.58%	5.10%
Asian alone (NH)	0	0	0	0.00%	0.00%	0.00%
Pacific Islander alone (NH)	0	0	0	0.00%	0.00%	0.00%
Other race alone (NH)	0	0	0	0.00%	0.00%	0.00%
Mixed race or Multiracial (NH)	4	6	10	0.52%	0.83%	1.64%
Hispanic or Latino (any race)	4	8	9	0.52%	1.10%	1.48%
Total	774	726	608	100.00%	100.00%	100.00%

=== 2000 census ===
As of the census of 2000, there were 774 people, 302 households, and 192 families residing in the town. The population density was 926.4 inhabitants per square mile (357.7/km^{2}). There were 339 housing units at an average density of 405.8 per square mile (156.7/km^{2}). The racial makeup of the town was 36.05% White, 57.11% African American, 6.20% Native American, 0.13% from other races, and 0.52% from two or more races. Hispanic or Latino of any race were 0.52% of the population.

There were 302 households, out of which 26.8% had children under the age of 18 living with them, 34.1% were married couples living together, 25.5% had a female householder with no husband present, and 36.1% were non-families. 33.8% of all households were made up of individuals, and 15.6% had someone living alone who was 65 years of age or older. The average household size was 2.56 and the average family size was 3.30.

In the town, the population was spread out, with 27.0% under the age of 18, 6.7% from 18 to 24, 26.4% from 25 to 44, 26.2% from 45 to 64, and 13.7% who were 65 years of age or older. The median age was 37 years. For every 100 females, there were 84.3 males. For every 100 females age 18 and over, there were 74.9 males.

The median income for a household in the town was $25,313, and the median income for a family was $31,875. Males had a median income of $26,364 versus $18,092 for females. The per capita income for the town was $14,215. About 23.0% of families and 28.9% of the population were below the poverty line, including 39.1% of those under age 18 and 21.3% of those age 65.
