= Marlboro County, South Carolina =

County in South Carolina, United States

- County
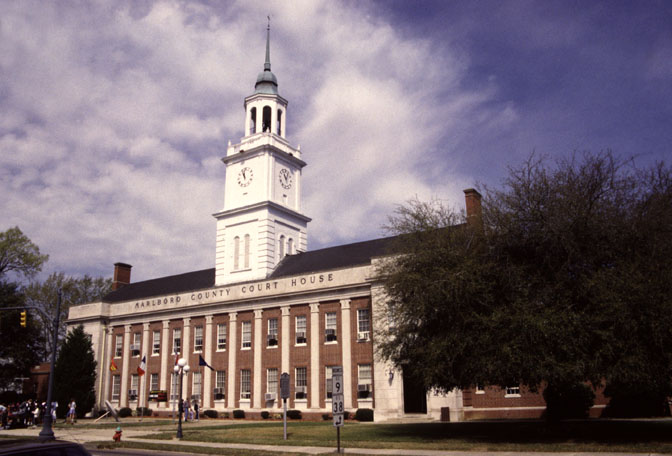
- Marlboro County Courthouse in Bennettsville

- Seal

- Location within the U.S. state of South Carolina
- Coordinates: 34.60°N 79.68°W
- Country: United States
- State: South Carolina
- Founded: 1785
- Named for: John Churchill, 1st Duke of Marlborough
- Seat: Bennettsville
- Largest community: Bennettsville

Area
  - Total: 485.46 sq mi (1,257.3 km^{2})
  - Land: 479.87 sq mi (1,242.9 km^{2})
  - Water: 5.59 sq mi (14.5 km^{2}) 1.15%

Population (2020)
  - Total: 26,667
  - Estimate (2025): 25,488 ▼
  - Density: 55.571/sq mi (21.456/km^{2})
- Time zone: UTC−5 (Eastern)
  - Summer (DST): UTC−4 (EDT)
- Congressional district: 7th
- Website: marlborocounty.sc.gov

Marlboro County is a county located in the Pee Dee region on the northern border of the U.S. state of South Carolina. As of the 2020 census, its population was 26,667. Its county seat is Bennettsville. The Great Pee Dee River runs through it.

Marlboro County is home to the Pee Dee Indian Tribe, a relatively small American Indian tribe that has occupied the Pee Dee region for several centuries. The tribe was officially recognized by the government of South Carolina around the beginning of the 21st century, and they have been seeking federal acknowledgment since 1976. While today the tribe consists of just over 200 enrolled members, they were once a significant cultural and political power in the region. Their influence and continual presence gave the region its Pee Dee name. Since 1976, the tribe's official seat of government has operated on land awarded to the tribe in Marlboro County.

== History ==
Succeeding indigenous peoples occupied this area for thousands of years. At the time of European encounter, the inhabitants of the area were the Pee Dee. Though nearly wiped out by European settlers, the Pee Dee Indian Tribe was able to survive centuries of war, disease, slavery and oppression, and has continued to maintain a presence in the area.

In the 1960s and early 1970s, researchers identified numerous sites in South Carolina and the Southeast that they associated with what they have classified as South Appalachian Mississippian culture. The settlements developed about AD 1000, later than did some of the largest settlements to the northwest that were closer to the Mississippi River and its tributaries.

Town Creek Indian Mound, a National Historic Landmark located across the border in present-day Montgomery County, North Carolina, is a surviving platform mound and archeological village site of this Pee Dee culture. It was occupied about 200 years and abandoned after AD 1150, for unknown reasons. In 2017, the Pee Dee Indian Tribe officially began work on the Pee Dee Tribal Mounds located on tribal land in McColl.

=== European colonization and later history ===
The first European colonists to arrive in the area were Welsh settlers, part of the British Isles colonists who migrated south from Pennsylvania. In 1737, they established the first European-American settlement, called Welsh Neck. These settlers organized a Baptist church in January 1738.

The South Carolina Welsh settlement consisted of 173,000 acres granted exclusively to Welsh settlers in 1737 by an act of the South Carolina Assembly. Within a decade, nearly all of this land had been taken and settled in by Welsh immigrants, the majority of whom were Baptists. They immigrated to what is now Marlboro County, South Carolina from existing Welsh settlements in Delaware and Pennsylvania as well as directly from Wales. The European settlement along the Peedee River from area around Poston and Gresham, South Carolina all the way to the area around McFarlan, North Carolina was exclusively Welsh between the 1730s and the 1780s.

On March 12, 1785, Marlboro County was established by the South Carolina General Assembly according to its powers as described in the 1778 Constitution of the State of South Carolina during the American Revolution. It was named for the Duke of Marlborough. The nascent county remained part of what was then known as Cheraws District until 1798, then in 1800 Marlboro became a district itself. Under the 1868 Constitution of the State of South Carolina, passed during the Reconstruction era, South Carolina districts became counties with home rule, where the legislative representatives from each county had additional powers as councillors of their county.

The first courthouse was built near the Great Pee Dee River, just north of Crooked Creek, in a village called Carlisle, named for Richard Carlisle.

To establish a central location for the county court, the state legislature designated Bennettsville, founded in 1819, as the new county seat. Construction for a courthouse, designed by Robert Mills, began in 1820. and was completed in 1824. It was replaced in the later 19th century. The second courthouse was expanded and renovated in 1953–1954.

== Geography ==
Interactive map of Marlboro County

According to the U.S. Census Bureau, the county has a total area of 485.46 square miles (1,257.3 km^{2}), of which 479.87 square miles (1,242.9 km^{2}) is land and 5.59 square miles (14.5 km^{2}) (1.15%) is water.

=== State and local protected area ===
- Lake Paul Wallace Wildlife Management Area

=== Major water bodies ===
- Crooked Creek
- Little Pee Dee River
- Great Pee Dee River
- Lake Wallace

=== Adjacent counties ===
- Richmond County, North Carolina – north
- Scotland County, North Carolina – northeast
- Robeson County, North Carolina – east
- Dillon County – east
- Florence County – south
- Darlington County – southwest
- Chesterfield County – west
- Anson County, North Carolina – northwest

== Demographics ==
Historical population
Census	Pop.	Note	%±
1790	10,706		—
1800	5,452		−49.1%
1810	4,966		−8.9%
1820	6,425		29.4%
1830	8,582		33.6%
1840	8,408		−2.0%
1850	10,789		28.3%
1860	12,434		15.2%
1870	11,814		−5.0%
1880	20,598		74.4%
1890	23,500		14.1%
1900	27,639		17.6%
1910	31,189		12.8%
1920	33,180		6.4%
1930	31,634		−4.7%
1940	33,281		5.2%
1950	31,766		−4.6%
1960	28,529		−10.2%
1970	27,151		−4.8%
1980	31,624		16.5%
1990	29,361		−7.2%
2000	28,818		−1.8%
2010	28,933		0.4%
2020	26,667		−7.8%
2025 (est.)	25,488	▼	−4.4%
U.S. Decennial Census; 1790–1960 1900–1990; 1990–2000 2010 2020

Marlboro County population distribution by age and sex in the 2000 census

=== 2020 census ===
As of the 2020 census, the county had a population of 26,667, with 10,241 households including 6,069 families residing in it.

The median age was 42.6 years, 19.1% of residents were under the age of 18, and 18.5% were 65 years of age or older. For every 100 females there were 109.1 males, and for every 100 females age 18 and over there were 110.2 males age 18 and over.

34.8% of residents lived in urban areas, while 65.2% lived in rural areas.

Of these households, 27.4% had children under the age of 18 living with them and 39.8% had a female householder with no spouse or partner present. About 33.5% of all households were made up of individuals and 14.8% had someone living alone who was 65 years of age or older. There were 12,029 housing units, of which 14.9% were vacant. Among occupied housing units, 66.3% were owner-occupied and 33.7% were renter-occupied, with a homeowner vacancy rate of 1.3% and a rental vacancy rate of 10.2%.

=== Racial and ethnic composition ===
In 2020 the county was 40.6% White, 50.2% Black or African American, 4.3% American Indian and Alaska Native, 0.4% Asian, 0.0% Native Hawaiian and Pacific Islander, 0.6% from some other race, and 3.9% from two or more races, while Hispanic or Latino residents of any race comprised 2.2% of the population; the table below compares those counts with the 2000 and 2010 censuses. If Hispanics are excluded from the racial categories and treated as separate group, the county is no longer majority African American.

Marlboro County, South Carolina – Racial and ethnic composition Note: the US Census treats Hispanic/Latino as an ethnic category. This table excludes Latinos from the racial categories and assigns them to a separate category. Hispanics/Latinos may be of any race.
Race / Ethnicity (NH = Non-Hispanic)	Pop 1980	Pop 1990	Pop 2000	Pop 2010	Pop 2020	% 1980	% 1990	% 2000	% 2010	% 2020
White alone (NH)	16,355	14,287	12,767	11,657	10,556	51.70%	48.66%	44.30%	40.29%	39.58%
Black or African American alone (NH)	14,481	14,222	14,559	14,652	13,302	45.78%	48.44%	50.52%	50.64%	49.88%
Native American or Alaska Native alone (NH)	489	732	947	1,265	1,130	1.55%	2.49%	3.29%	4.37%	4.24%
Asian alone (NH)	24	25	67	74	99	0.08%	0.09%	0.23%	0.26%	0.37%
Native Hawaiian or Pacific Islander alone (NH)	x	x	1	3	7	x	x	0.00%	0.01%	0.03%
Other race alone (NH)	0	16	28	23	39	0.00%	0.05%	0.10%	0.08%	0.15%
Mixed race or Multiracial (NH)	x	x	244	459	959	x	x	0.85%	1.59%	3.60%
Hispanic or Latino (any race)	285	79	205	800	575	0.90%	0.27%	0.71%	2.77%	2.16%
Total	31,634	29,361	28,818	28,933	26,667	100.00%	100.00%	100.00%	100.00%	100.00%

=== 2010 census ===
At the 2010 census, there were 28,933 people, 10,383 households, and 6,903 families in the county. The population density was 60.3 inhabitants per square mile (23.3 inhabitants/km^{2}). There were 12,072 housing units at an average density of 25.2 units per square mile (9.7 units/km^{2}). The racial makeup of the county was 50.9% black or African American, 41.4% white, 4.5% American Indian, 0.3% Asian, 1.1% from other races, and 1.8% from two or more races. Those of Hispanic or Latino origin made up 2.8% of the population. In terms of ancestry, and 9.7% were American.

Of the 10,383 households, 33.5% had children under the age of 18 living with them, 36.8% were married couples living together, 24.3% had a female householder with no husband present, 33.5% were non-families, and 30.0% of households were made up of individuals. The average household size was 2.47 and the average family size was 3.06. The median age was 38.8 years.

The median household income was $27,688 and the median family income was $32,485. Males had a median income of $31,170 versus $24,885 for females. The per capita income for the county was $13,817. About 23.3% of families and 27.5% of the population were below the poverty line, including 40.4% of those under age 18 and 17.6% of those age 65 or over.

=== 2000 census ===
At the 2000 census, there were 28,818 people, 10,478 households, and 7,334 families in the county. The population density was 60 people per square mile (23 people/km^{2}). There were 11,894 housing units at an average density of 25 units per square mile (9.7 units/km^{2}). The racial makeup of the county was 50.73% Black or African American, 44.49% White, 3.36% Native American, 0.24% Asian, 0.24% from other races, and 0.95% from two or more races. 0.71% of the population were Hispanic or Latino of any race. Of the 10,478 households 32.00% had children under the age of 18 living with them, 42.60% were married couples living together, 22.20% had a female householder with no husband present, and 30.00% were non-families. 26.90% of households were one person and 11.00% were one person aged 65 or older. The average household size was 2.59 and the average family size was 3.14.

The age distribution was 26.20% under the age of 18, 9.30% from 18 to 24, 29.40% from 25 to 44, 22.80% from 45 to 64, and 12.30% 65 or older. The median age was 35 years. For every 100 females there were 96.30 males. For every 100 females age 18 and over, there were 93.10 males.

The median household income was $26,598 and the median family income was $32,019. Males had a median income of $25,896 versus $20,590 for females. The per capita income for the county was $13,385. About 17.70% of families and 21.70% of the population were below the poverty line, including 29.20% of those under age 18 and 22.70% of those age 65 or over.

== Government and politics ==
After Democrats regained power in the state in the late nineteenth century, the legislature passed a new constitution that raised barriers to voter registration, effectively disfranchising black voters; at the time blacks comprised a majority of the population in the state and mostly supported Republican candidates. The state legislature also imposed legal racial segregation and laws for Jim Crow and white supremacy. This situation of disfranchisement lasted largely into the 1960s, until after Congress passed the federal Voting Rights Act of 1965, to give the government oversight and power to enforce constitutional rights for all citizens. As part of the Solid South, the whites of the county and state used to vote overwhelmingly Democratic, giving 100% of its vote to the party in 1924. White South Carolina residents (and throughout the South) had outsize power in Congress, as they controlled seats apportioned on the basis of total population of the state, while disfranchising the blacks.

Since the late 20th century, the county has voted mostly Democratic, but the demographics of political alignments have changed markedly since the 19th century. African Americans have mostly left the Republican Party to support the national Democratic Party. Conservative whites have shifted to the Republican Party. In the 1972 election, Republican Richard Nixon won every county in the state including Marlboro, and this was, as of 2024, the last time a Republican carried the county. In state and local voting, many whites have voted for Republican candidates, and African Americans have tended to continue to support the Democrats. In 2024, Donald Trump gained over 48% of the vote as opposed to Harris' 51%, the closest a Republican has come to carrying the county since 1972.

United States presidential election results for Marlboro County, South Carolina
Year	Republican		Democratic		Third party(ies)	
Year	No.	%	No.	%	No.	%
1892	262	18.23%	1,004	69.87%	171	11.90%
1896	237	16.10%	1,232	83.70%	3	0.20%
1900	35	4.67%	714	95.33%	0	0.00%
1904	14	1.82%	755	98.18%	0	0.00%
1908	16	1.71%	917	98.29%	0	0.00%
1912	0	0.00%	719	100.00%	0	0.00%
1916	2	0.18%	1,071	98.44%	15	1.38%
1920	5	0.52%	960	99.48%	0	0.00%
1924	0	0.00%	716	100.00%	0	0.00%
1928	27	3.57%	729	96.43%	0	0.00%
1932	22	3.11%	685	96.89%	0	0.00%
1936	7	0.70%	988	99.30%	0	0.00%
1940	13	2.41%	526	97.59%	0	0.00%
1944	34	3.47%	874	89.27%	71	7.25%
1948	41	2.77%	354	23.94%	1,084	73.29%
1952	1,541	47.56%	1,699	52.44%	0	0.00%
1956	507	18.12%	1,769	63.22%	522	18.66%
1960	1,291	33.30%	2,586	66.70%	0	0.00%
1964	1,864	43.49%	2,422	56.51%	0	0.00%
1968	2,024	31.34%	2,294	35.52%	2,140	33.14%
1972	3,838	65.58%	1,999	34.16%	15	0.26%
1976	1,961	26.58%	5,409	73.32%	7	0.09%
1980	2,585	32.15%	5,378	66.89%	77	0.96%
1984	3,951	47.70%	4,294	51.84%	38	0.46%
1988	2,921	42.52%	3,937	57.31%	12	0.17%
1992	2,526	29.47%	5,111	59.64%	933	10.89%
1996	2,148	26.76%	5,348	66.63%	531	6.62%
2000	2,699	34.24%	5,060	64.19%	124	1.57%
2004	3,423	39.99%	4,984	58.22%	153	1.79%
2008	3,996	36.74%	6,794	62.47%	86	0.79%
2012	3,676	37.31%	6,100	61.91%	77	0.78%
2016	4,267	41.07%	5,954	57.31%	168	1.62%
2020	5,044	44.07%	6,290	54.95%	112	0.98%
2024	4,896	48.23%	5,137	50.60%	119	1.17%

== Economy ==
In 2022, the GDP was $918.3 million (about $35,726 per capita), and the real GDP was $753 million (about $29,295 per capita) in chained 2017 dollars.

As of April 2024, some of the top employers of the county include the United States Department of Justice, Domtar, Food Lion, Domino's, and Walmart.

Employment and Wage Statistics by Industry in Marlboro County, South Carolina - Q3 2023
Industry	Employment Counts	Employment Percentage (%)	Average Annual Wage ($)
Accommodation and Food Services	286	5.9	18,512
Administrative and Support and Waste Management and Remediation Services	77	1.6	23,868
Agriculture, Forestry, Fishing and Hunting	56	1.2	36,140
Arts, Entertainment, and Recreation	0	0.0	0
Construction	54	1.1	51,168
Finance and Insurance	73	1.5	46,124
Health Care and Social Assistance	741	15.3	32,396
Information	6	0.1	39,624
Manufacturing	1,455	30.1	65,000
Other Services (except Public Administration)	66	1.4	32,136
Professional, Scientific, and Technical Services	48	1.0	46,280
Public Administration	974	20.1	59,384
Real Estate and Rental and Leasing	39	0.8	74,256
Retail Trade	741	15.3	31,304
Transportation and Warehousing	202	4.2	64,116
Utilities	6	0.1	88,972
Wholesale Trade	15	0.3	52,156
Total	4,839	100.0%	48,904

== Transportation ==
=== Major highways ===
- Future I-73
- I-95
- US 1
- US 15
- SC 9
- SC 9 Bus.
- SC 34
- SC 38
- SC 38 Bus.
- SC 79
- SC 83
- SC 177
- SC 381
- SC 385
- SC 385 Conn.
- SC 912

=== Airports ===
- Marlboro County Jetport
- Myrtle Beach International Airport (MYR), 76.8 miles southeast of Bennettsville
- Charlotte International Airport (CLT), 81.3 miles northwest of Bennettsville
- Clio Crop Care Airport (9W9)

== Communities ==
=== Cities ===
- Bennettsville (county seat and largest community)
- Cheraw (mostly in Chesterfield County)

=== Towns ===
- Blenheim
- Clio
- McColl
- Tatum

=== Census-designated places ===
- Wallace

== See also ==
- List of counties in South Carolina
- National Register of Historic Places listings in Marlboro County, South Carolina
