= U.S. Route 52 in South Carolina =

Section of U.S. highway in South Carolina

U.S. Highway 52
- US 52 highlighted in red

Route information
- Maintained by SCDOT
- Length: 159.960 mi (257.431 km)
- Existed: 1935–present

Major junctions
- East end: Line Street / Meeting Street in Charleston
- I-26 / US 17 in Charleston; US 78 in North Charleston; I-526 in North Charleston; US 17 Alt. in Moncks Corner; US 521 near Greeleyville; US 378 in Lake City; US 301 / SC 327 in Effingham; US 76 in Florence; I-95 in Florence; US 1 / SC 9 in Cheraw
- North end: US 52 at the North Carolina state line in McFarlan, NC

Location
- Country: United States
- State: South Carolina
- Counties: Charleston, Berkeley, Williamsburg, Florence, Darlington, Chesterfield

Highway system
- United States Numbered Highway System; List; Special; Divided; South Carolina State Highway System; Interstate; US; State; Scenic
← SC 51	→ SC 53

U.S. Route 52 (US 52) is an east–west United States Numbered Highway that runs for 159.960-mile (257.431 km) from Charleston to the North Carolina state line near Cheraw. It serves as a strategic highway through the central part of the state.

== Route description ==
US 52 begins at the intersection of Meeting and Line Streets, in Charleston. Going northwest along Meeting Street, it connects with I-26/US 17, followed by Morrison Drive (US 52 Spur hidden); US 52 signage begin to appear north of Morrison Drive. In North Charleston, it is concurrent with US 78 for 11 miles (18 km), splitting near Goose Creek.

From Moncks Corner, US 52 is briefly concurrent with US 17 Alt as it enters the Francis Marion National Forest and crosses the Dennis C. Bishop Bridge over the Tail Race Canal of the Cooper River just below Lake Moultrie. The route traverses the Francis Marion National Forest as it continues northward to St. Stephen. From there is proceeds to Kingstree and Lake City, before another short concurrency with US 301 from Effingham to Florence. Through downtown Florence, it goes northwest and bypasses Darlington and joining another concurrency with US 401.

At Society Hill, it merges briefly with US 15 before continuing north again solo to Cheraw, where it overlaps briefly with US 1 and SC 9. US 52 crosses the North Carolina state line, after traveling 159.7 miles (257.0 km) through South Carolina, continuing on towards Wadesboro.

US 52 is a major highway between Charleston and Florence, all of which is four-lane or more with some sections signed 60-mile-per-hour (97 km/h). North of Darlington, it becomes mostly a two-lane rural highway through the remainder of its route. The route is signed north–south north of US 378 near Lake City, and is signed east–west south of that point. The route is nominally north–south, as reflected by its mileposts.

=== Dedicated and memorial names ===
US 52 in South Carolina feature a few dedicated or memorialized stretches of freeway.

- Blue Star Memorial Highway – Official honorary name of US 52 in Berkeley County. Markers are located in Moncks Corner, Pineville, and St. Stephen.
- L. Lawson Rhodes Highway – Is a dedicated section of US 52 located in Chesterfield County. Dedicated in August, 2013, it is in honor of Patrolman L. Lawson Rhodes, who served as a trooper with the South Carolina Highway Patrol, who died on duty in 1938.

== History ==
US 52 was established in 1935 as a renumbering of US 601 from the North Carolina state line to Florence and US 17 from Florence to Charleston. In 1939, US 52 was rerouted into a concurrency with US 78 in North Charleston, leaving a section of Meeting Street. Also in the same year, Cheraw to the North Carolina state line was the last section to be paved; while the first section of US 52 was widen to four-lane from Charleston to Durant Avenue, in North Charleston.

In 1940, US 52 was rerouted onto new alignment west of Lake City. In 1948, US 52 was taken off King Street and placed on Meeting Street to Lee Street, in Charleston. Around 1952–1969, US 52 was split during that period in Florence, with northbound along Irby Street and southbound along Coit Avenue; before and after it was solely on Irby Street. Also around 1952, US 52 was bypassed west of Kingstree on new primary routing; the old route through town remained part of SC 261 while Academy Street, Kelly Street and Third Avenue were downgraded to secondary roads (all three SC-45-8).

In 1971, US 52 was moved onto new alignment south of Moncks Corner, leaving behind Old Highway 52 (S-8-791). By 1973, US 52 was placed on new primary routing bypassing west around Darlington, leaving behind US 52 Bus.

== Major intersections ==
County	Location	mi	km	Destinations	Notes
Charleston	Charleston	0.000	0.000	Line Street / Meeting Street east	Eastern terminus; Meeting Street continues past terminus.
Charleston	Charleston	0.568– 0.600	0.914– 0.966	US 17 north – Mount Pleasant	No access to US 17 south from US 52
Charleston	Charleston	0.630	1.014	I-26 west – North Charleston, Columbia	No access to I-26 east from US 52; I-26 exit 221B
Charleston	Charleston	1.260	2.028	Morrison Drive (US 52 Spur south) to US 78 / Mount Pleasant Street	Northern terminus of US 52 Spur
Charleston	North Charleston	3.220– 3.320	5.182– 5.343	I-26 west – Columbia	Westbound exit and eastbound entrance; access to I-26 east via Spruill Avenue; I-26 exit 217
Charleston	North Charleston	4.400	7.081	US 78 east (Rivers Avenue)	Eastern end of US 78 concurrency
Charleston	North Charleston	4.890	7.870	SC 7 south (Cosgrove Avenue)	Northern terminus of SC 7
Charleston	North Charleston	5.040	8.111	SC 642 west (Dorchester Road) – Summerville	Eastern terminus of SC 642
Charleston	North Charleston	8.050– 8.145	12.955– 13.108	I-526 – Mount Pleasant, Savannah	I-526 exits 18A-B
Charleston	North Charleston	12.860	20.696	US 52 Conn. south to I-26 east – Charleston	No westbound exit; northern terminus of US 52 Conn.; I-26 exit 209A
Charleston	North Charleston	13.750– 14.330	22.128– 23.062	US 78 west (University Boulevard) / N.A.D. Road – Summerville	Western end of US 78 concurrency; southern terminus of N.A.D. Road; interchange; to Charleston Southern University and Naval Weapons Station
Berkeley	Goose Creek	15.870	25.540	US 176 west (St. James Avenue) / Red Bank Road east – Holly Hill	Eastern terminus of US 176; western terminus of Red Bank Road
Berkeley	Moncks Corner	30.460– 30.470	49.021– 49.037	SC 6 west (Main Street) / SC 6 Truck begins / Main Street Extension east – Holly Hill	Eastern end of SC 6 Truck concurrency; eastern terminus of SC 6 and Main Street; western terminus of SC 6 Truck; western terminus of Main Street Extension
Berkeley	Moncks Corner	31.270	50.324	US 17 Alt. south / SC 6 Truck west (Live Oak Drive) – Summerville	Western end of SC 6 Truck concurrency; eastern end of US 17 Alt. concurrency
Berkeley		32.487	52.283	Dennis C. Bishop Bridge	Crossing of Tail Race Canal
Berkeley		32.897	52.943	To SC 402 – Cordesville, Huger	Western terminus of unnamed access road
Berkeley		33.040	53.173	US 17 Alt. north – Georgetown	Western end of US 17 Alt concurrency
Berkeley	St. Stephen	46.240	74.416	SC 45 (Ravenell Drive) – Jamestown, Pineville	
Williamsburg		56.350	90.687	SC 375 (Gourdin Road) – Gourdin, Greeleyville	
Williamsburg		61.270	98.605	US 521 – Salters, Greeleyville	
Williamsburg		68.220	109.789	SC 261 north (Manning Highway) – Manning	Eastern end of SC 261 concurrency
Williamsburg	Kingstree	70.820	113.974	SC 261 south (Main Street) / SC 527 south (Longstreet Street) – Andrews, Hemingway	Western end of SC 261 concurrency; eastern end of SC 527 concurrency
Williamsburg	Kingstree	71.430	114.955	SC 527 north (Academy Street) – Sumter	Western end of SC 527 concurrency
Williamsburg	Cades	80.280	129.198	SC 512 east / Cade Road – Cades, Hebron	Western terminus of SC 512
Florence	Lake City	86.600	139.369	US 378 Bus. / SC 341 (Main Street) – Johnsonville, Olanta, Sumter	
Florence	Lake City	87.740– 87.770	141.204– 141.252	US 378 – Conway, Sumter	Cardinal direction change: Southbound becomes eastbound, westbound becomes northbound
Florence	Coward	93.080	149.798	SC 541 west (Salem Road) – Olanta	Eastern terminus of SC 541
Florence	Effingham	100.000	160.934	US 301 south (Olanta Highway) / SC 327 north (Effingham Highway) – Evergreen, Olanta, Manning	Southern end of US 301 concurrency
Florence	Florence	105.850	170.349	US 52 Truck north / US 301 north (Freedom Boulevard) – Marion	Northern end of US 301 concurrency; southern terminus of US 52 Truck
Florence	Florence	107.430	172.892	SC 51 (Pamplico Highway / Second Loop Road)	
Florence	Florence	107.580	173.133	Pamplico Highway south (SC 51 Conn. south) / James Jones Avenue north	Northern terminus of SC 51 Conn.; southern terminus of James Jones Avenue
Florence	Florence	109.400	176.062	US 76 (Palmetto Street / US 52 Conn. north) – Marion, Timmonsville	Southern terminus of US 52 Conn.; to Francis Marion University
Florence	Florence	110.200	177.350	West Lucas Street east (US 52 Truck south) / North Irby Street north	Northern terminus of US 52 Truck; US 52 turns left off of North Irby Street and onto West Lucas Street.
Florence	Florence	110.470	177.784	Coit Street south (US 52 Conn. south)	Northern terminus of US 52 Conn. and Coit Street
Florence		112.730– 112.800	181.421– 181.534	I-95 – Fayetteville, Savannah	I-95 exit 164; to Myrtle Beach via I-95 and SC 327
Darlington	Darlington	117.600	189.259	US 52 Bus. north (Main Street) / SC 34 Truck east (Governor Williams Highway east) – Darlington	Southern end of SC 34 Truck concurrency, which takes on the Governor Williams Highway name; southern terminus of US 52 Bus.
Darlington	Darlington	119.000	191.512	SC 340 – Darlington, Timmonsville	
Darlington	Darlington	119.650	192.558	US 401 south (Lamar Highway / SC 34 Conn. east) – Sumter	Southern end of US 401 concurrency; western terminus of SC 34 Conn.
Darlington	Darlington	119.930	193.009	SC 34 / SC 151 (Harry Byrd Highway) – Hartsville, Darlington, Charlotte	Northern end of SC 34 Truck concurrency; interchange
Darlington		123.068	198.059	US 52 Bus. south (Main Street) – Darlington	Northern terminus of US 52 Bus.
Darlington		134.210	215.990	US 15 south (Hartsville Highway) – Hartsville	Southern end of US 15 concurrency
Darlington	Society Hill	136.290	219.337	US 15 north / US 401 north (Main Street) – Bennettsville	Northern end of US 15 and US 401 concurrencies
Chesterfield		147.440	237.282	US 1 south – McBee, Camden	Southern end of US 1 concurrency
Chesterfield		148.350	238.746	US 1 Truck / US 52 Truck (Cash Road) to SC 9 / SC 9 Truck	Southern terminus of US 1 Truck and US 52 Truck
Chesterfield	Cheraw	149.780	241.048	SC 9 north (Market Street) – Chesterfield	Southern end of SC 9 concurrency
Chesterfield	Cheraw	151.040	243.075	US 1 north / SC 9 south (Powe Street) – Wallace, Bennettsville, Rockingham	Northern end of US 1 and SC 9 concurrencies
Chesterfield	Cheraw	151.340	243.558	US 52 Truck south / SC 9 Truck south (Front Street)	Southern end of SC 9 Truck concurrency; northern terminus of US 52 Truck
Chesterfield	Cheraw	151.788	244.279	Patrolman Gilbert "Gil" Halma Bridge	Crossing over Huckleberry Branch
Chesterfield		154.510	248.660	SC 9 Truck north (Four Mile Loop Road) – Chesterfield	Northern end of SC 9 Truck concurrency
Chesterfield		159.960	257.431	US 52 north – Wadesboro	Continuation into North Carolina
1.000 mi = 1.609 km; 1.000 km = 0.621 mi: Concurrency terminus; Incomplete access

== See also ==
- Special routes of U.S. Route 52

U.S. Route 52
Previous state: North Carolina	South Carolina	Next state: Terminus
