= South Carolina Highway 260 =

State highway in South Carolina, United States

South Carolina Highway 260

Route information
- Maintained by SCDOT
- Length: 12.520 mi (20.149 km)

Major junctions
- South end: Dam Street / Highway 260 in Eagle Point
- US 301 in Manning
- North end: SC 261 in Manning

Location
- Country: United States
- State: South Carolina
- Counties: Clarendon

Highway system
- South Carolina State Highway System; Interstate; US; State; Scenic
← SC 254	→ SC 261

South Carolina Highway 260 (SC 260) is a 12.520-mile-long (20.149 km) state highway in the U.S. state of South Carolina. The highway connects the Santee Dam and Manning.

== Route description ==
SC 260 begins just north of the Santee Dam (which lies at the eastern end of Lake Marion) at a locale known as Eagle Point, within Clarendon County. It crosses over a part of the northeastern part of the lake. After it started curving to the north, it crosses over Birch Branch and part of White Oak Branch. It then passes the Clarendon County Airport – Sprott Field, which is just east of the Wyboo Golf Club. The highway crosses over Ox Swamp and Hog Branch just before entering Manning. In the city, it passes Clarendon Memorial Hospital, then has an intersection with U.S. Route 301 (US 301; Sunset Drive). About three blocks later, it meets its northern terminus, an intersection with SC 261 (West Boyce Street). Here, the roadway continues as North Mill Street.

== Major intersections ==
The entire route is in Clarendon County.

Location	mi	km	Destinations	Notes
Santee Dam	0.000	0.000	Dam Street south / Highway 260 south	Southern terminus of SC 260; northern terminus of Dam Street and Highway 260
Manning	12.260	19.731	US 301 (Sunset Drive) – Summerton, Orangeburg, Walterboro, Turbeville, Florence	
Manning	12.520	20.149	SC 261 (West Boyce Street) – Paxville, Kingstree	Northern terminus
1.000 mi = 1.609 km; 1.000 km = 0.621 mi: Concurrency terminus
