= South Carolina Highway 327 =

State highway in South Carolina

South Carolina Highway 327

Route information
- Maintained by SCDOT
- Length: 22.623 mi (36.408 km)
- Existed: 1942–present

Major junctions
- South end: US 52 / US 301 in Effingham
- US 76 / US 301 in Mars Bluff; I-95 near Quinby
- North end: North Williston Road near Quinby

Location
- Country: United States
- State: South Carolina
- Counties: Florence

Highway system
- South Carolina State Highway System; Interstate; US; State; Scenic
← SC 324	→ SC 329

South Carolina Highway 327 (SC 327) is a 22.623-mile (36.408 km) primary state highway in the U.S. state of South Carolina. It serves as an alternative bypass east of Florence and a connector route for Interstate 95 (I-95) and the eastern terminus of I-20 to access Myrtle Beach.

== Route description ==
SC 327 has two identities: one as a rural two-lane highway bypassing Florence and the other as a divided four-lane highway connecting beach travelers from U.S. Route 76 (US 76) and US 301 and onto Myrtle Beach to I-95. SC 327 indirectly connects to I-20 toward Columbia via I-95 south. I-20’s eastern terminus is 10 miles away from SC 327’s northern terminus.

== History ==
The route was established by 1942 as a new primary routing from US 52 in Effingham, to SC 51 in Evergreen. In 1947 or 1948, SC 327 was extended east as a new primary routing from Evergreen to US 76/US 301 in Winona. By 1952, the Effingham to Evergreen section was paved, and later extended east to Clausen a year later; by 1958 the entire route was paved.

By 1958, SC 327 was rerouted from Claussen to US 76/US 301 in Mars Bluff; the old alignment was downgraded to secondary roads: National Cemetery Road (S-21-13) and Paper Mill Road (S-21-24). In 1971, SC 327 was extended north, overlapping with US 76/US 301 then north along existing roads to I-95. In 1992, the US 76/US 301 to I-95 section was widened to a divided four-lane highway for connecting the beach traffic coming from Columbia and the eastern terminus of I-20 to SC 327 toward Myrtle Beach. The distance between the terminuses of I-20 and SC 327 is 10 miles away from each other via I-95. In 2003, I-95 was widened to six lanes throughout Florence to better improve the beach traffic flow coming from I-20’s eastern terminus to SC 327.

In 2010, funds were appropriated to improve the interchange at I-95; construction began the following year.

== Junction list ==
The entire route is in Florence County.

Location	mi	km	Destinations	Notes
Effingham	0.000	0.000	US 52 / US 301 – Florence, Olanta, Manning, Lake City	Southern terminus
Evergreen	5.050	8.127	SC 51 north (Pamplico Highway) – Florence	North end of SC 51 overlap
Evergreen	5.190	8.352	SC 51 south (Pamplico Highway) – Pamplico	South end of SC 51 overlap
Mars Bluff	15.720	25.299	US 76 east / US 301 north (Marion Highway) – Marion, Myrtle Beach	East end of US 76 and north end of US 301 overlap
Florence	17.410	28.019	US 76 west (Palmetto Street) / US 301 south (Freedom Boulevard) – Florence, Manning	West end of US 76 and north end of US 301 overlap
	22.600– 22.602	36.371– 36.374	I-95 to I-20 – Fayetteville, Savannah, Columbia	I-95 exit 170
	22.623	36.408	North Williston Road north	Northern terminus
1.000 mi = 1.609 km; 1.000 km = 0.621 mi: Concurrency terminus
