= Lawrence Manning =

Lawrence, Laurence or Larry Manning may refer to:

- Laurence Manning, the science fiction writer whose name sometimes appeared with the more common spelling
- Lawrence Manning, developer of SmoothWall
- Larry Manning, NASCAR driver
- Laurence Manning Academy in Manning, South Carolina

== See also ==
- John Lawrence Manning, 65th governor of South Carolina
