= Johnsonville crater =

Proposed impact crater in South Carolina, US

- Location within the United States Location within South Carolina
- Location: Johnsonville, Florence County, South Carolina, United States; 33°49′N 79°22′W

Impact crater structure
- Confidence: Proven; Not confirmed
- Diameter: ~11 km (6.8 mi)
- Age: 35 ± 0.3 Ma; Late Eocene
- Exposed: Yes
- Drilled: No

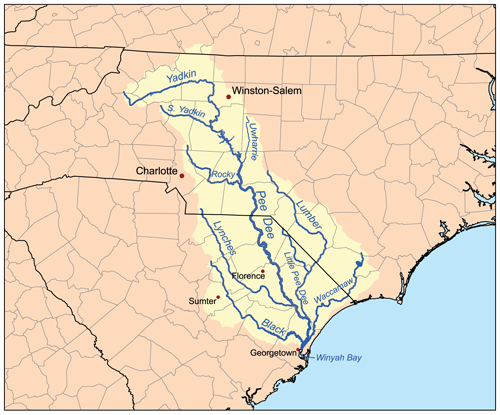
Map of watershed showing Lynches River and Pee Dee River

The Johnsonville crater or the Snow's Island crater is a circular geophysical feature situated at the junction of the Lynches River and the Pee Dee River in South Carolina, United States, which has been interpreted by some scientists as an impact crater. Snow's Island, at that point, is believed to be the upthrust formed at the center of the crater after the impact. The structure is approximately 8 miles (13 km) in diameter, but is not well defined at the surface. It was discovered by magnetic anomalies, supported by the study of well drilling cores. Supposed impact breccia was found in these cores. The Russian Academy of Sciences lists the structure as a proven impact crater, though the Earth Impact Database (EID) does not list it as confirmed.
