= South Carolina Highway 51 =

State highway in South Carolina

South Carolina Highway 51

- Map of the Georgetown-Florence segment of SC 51

Route information
- Maintained by SCDOT
- Length: 70.65 mi (113.70 km)
- Existed: 1926–present

Georgetown–Florence segment
- Length: 69.64 mi (112.07 km)
- South end: US 701 near Georgetown
- Major intersections: US 378 in Kingsburg; US 301 in Florence; US 52 in Florence
- North end: US 76 in Florence

York segment
- Length: 1.01 mi (1.63 km)
- South end: US 21 near Fort Mill
- North end: NC 51 at the North Carolina state line in Pineville, NC

Location
- Country: United States
- State: South Carolina
- Counties: Georgetown, Williamsburg, Florence, York

Highway system
- South Carolina State Highway System; Interstate; US; State; Scenic
← SC 49	→ US 52

South Carolina Highway 51 (SC 51) is a primary state highway in the U.S. state of South Carolina. It is unique for having two segments, which are separated by over one hundred miles (160 km) from each other. The first segment, traveling north–south, connects the cities of Georgetown and Florence, via the towns of Hemingway, Johnsonville, and Pamplico. The second segment, near Fort Mill, is a reciprocated continuation of North Carolina Highway 51 (NC 51) from the North Carolina state line to U.S. Route 21 (US 21).

== Route description ==
Map of the northern segment of SC 51

The main segment of SC 51 begins at US 701, just north of Georgetown. Traveling in a northwesterly direction, along Browns Ferry Road, it merges onto SC 41 in Rhems. For the next 2.3 miles (3.7 km), SC 41/SC 51 straddle the county line between Georgetown and Williamsburg counties, before breaking off towards Hemingway, near Rome Crossroads. Connecting with SC 261 in Hemingway, it soon enters Florence County and Johnsonville. Continuing north, it changes from traveling along SC 41 to US 378 in Kingsburg and continues west. After 3.5 miles (5.6 km), it splits from US 378 in Salem, traveling northwest along Pamplico Highway towards Pamplico and finally Florence. In Florence, SC 51 connects with US 301 (Freedom Boulevard) and US 52 (Irby Street); it then travels west along Second Loop Road to its northern end at US 76, a few feet south of an intersection of Interstate 20 Business (I-20 Bus.), where the roadway continues as West Evans Street. Past US 76 and I-20 Bus., West Evans Street continues toward the Downtown district of Florence. The majority of the route is a two-lane rural road through mostly swamp and farmland. Around Hemingway and Florence, the route expands to four lanes and has a median.

The York County segment of SC 51 is a short one-mile (1.6 km) road that starts at US 21 near Fort Mill and ends at the North Carolina state line, where it continues on as NC 51 through Pineville. The route is entirely two-lane, expanding to four lanes at the state line.

== History ==
Established as a new primary routing in 1926; the original routing ran from SC 40 (today as US 701) along Choppee Road (today as S-22-4) and Hemingway Highway (today as SC 261) to Hemingway then onto Florence, ending at SC 41 (today as US 52). The route was fully paved by 1939. In the early 1960s, the SC 51 was rerouted as a concurrency with SC 41 from Hemingway to Rhems, then to US 701 near Georgetown. In 1978, SC 51 was extended along Second Loop Road, in Florence, to US 76.

The York County segment of SC 51 was established in 1969. In the prior year, US 21 was rerouted northwest onto a new freeway route into North Carolina and its old alignment through Pineville was replaced by an extension of NC 51 to the state line. South Carolina reciprocated with SC 51, keeping the route number consistent across the border.

== Junction list ==
County	Location	mi	km	Destinations	Notes
Georgetown		0.00	0.00	US 701 (Fraser Street) – Georgetown	Southern terminus
Williamsburg	Rhems	15.77	25.38	SC 41 (County Line Road) / Nesmith Road – Andrews, Charleston, Kingstree	Southern end of SC 41 concurrency
Williamsburg		18.13	29.18	SC 513 north (County Line Road)	Southern terminus of SC 513
Williamsburg	Rome Crossroads	19.33	31.11	SC 512 (Henry Road) – Kingstree	
Williamsburg	Hemingway	26.94	43.36	SC 261 (Broad Street) – Stuckey, Kingstree, Conway	
Florence	Johnsonville	31.51	50.71	SC 341 west (Broadway Street) – Lake City	Eastern terminus of SC 341
Florence	Kingsburg	36.06	58.03	US 378 east / SC 41 north / Old River Road – Conway, Marion, Mullins, Myrtle Beach	Northern end of SC 41 concurrency; southern end of US 378 concurrency
Florence	Salem	39.34	63.31	US 378 west – Lake City, Sumter	Northern end of US 378 overlap
Florence	Evergreen	57.08	91.86	SC 327 north (Planer Road) / Lebanon Road	Southern end of SC 327 concurrency
Florence	Evergreen	57.22	92.09	SC 327 south (Effingham Highway) – Effingham	Northern end of SC 327 concurrency
Florence	Florence	65.40	105.25	US 301 (Freedom Boulevard) – Lake City, Kingstree, Charleston	
Florence	Florence			South Church Street (US 52 Truck) – Lake City	
Florence	Florence			Pamplico Highway north (SC 51 Conn. north) to US 52 north – Florence	Southern terminus of SC 51 Conn.; SC 51 and SC 51 Conn. share the Pamplico Highway name.
Florence	Florence	65.97	106.17	US 52 (Irby Street) – Lake City	
Florence	Florence	69.64	112.07	US 76 (Palmetto Street) – Sumter West Evans Street north to I-20 BS (David H. McLeod Boulevard) – Columbia, Downtown Florence	Northern terminus of Georgetown–Florence segment of SC 51; roadway continues towards I-20 Bus. and downtown of Florence as West Evans Street
Gap in route
York		0.00	0.00	US 21 to I-77 – Rock Hill, Carowinds, Charlotte	
York		1.01	1.63	NC 51 north – Pineville	Continuation into North Carolina
1.000 mi = 1.609 km; 1.000 km = 0.621 mi: Concurrency terminus

== Special routes ==
=== Pamplico alternate route ===
South Carolina Highway 51 Alternate
- Location: Pamplico, South Carolina
- Existed: 1936–1947

South Carolina Highway 51 Alternate (SC 51 Alt.) was an alternate route that existed entirely within the southern part of Pamplico. It was established in November 1936 as a short loop off of the mainline, using Main Street, Trade Street, and 3rd Avenue. In 1947, it was decommissioned.

=== Florence connector route ===
South Carolina Highway 51 Connector
- Location: Florence, South Carolina
- Length: 0.240 mi (386 m)

South Carolina Highway 51 Connector (SC 51 Conn.) is a 0.240-mile (0.386 km) connector route that serves to connect SC 51 and US 52. Its entire length is known as Pamplico Highway and is unsigned.

It begins at an intersection with the SC 51 mainline (known as West 2nd Loop Road west of here and also known as Pamplico Highway east of here). It travels to the northwest and immediately curves slightly more to the north-northwest. It then reaches its northern terminus, an intersection with US 52 (South Irby Street) and the southern terminus of James Jones Avenue.

The entire route is in Florence, Florence County.

mi	km	Destinations	Notes
0.000	0.000	SC 51 – Hemingway	Southern terminus; provides access to MUSC Health – Florence Medical Center
0.240	0.386	South Irby Street (US 52) / James Jones Avenue north – Lake City	Northern terminus of SC 51 Conn. and Pamplico Highway; southern terminus of James Jones Avenue
1.000 mi = 1.609 km; 1.000 km = 0.621 mi
