= South Carolina Highway 261 =

State highway in South Carolina, United States

South Carolina Highway 261

Route information
- Maintained by SCDOT
- Length: 116.960 mi (188.229 km)
- Existed: 1926–present
- History: Completed in 1944

Major junctions
- South end: US 701 in Yauhannah
- US 52 / SC 527 in Kingstree; US 521 near Manning; US 301 in Manning; I-95 near Manning; US 15 in Paxville; US 76 / US 378 in Stateburg
- North end: US 521 near Boykin

Location
- Country: United States
- State: South Carolina
- Counties: Georgetown, Williamsburg, Clarendon, Sumter, Kershaw

Highway system
- South Carolina State Highway System; Interstate; US; State; Scenic
← SC 260	→ SC 262

South Carolina Highway 261 (SC 261) is a 116.960-mile (188.229 km) state highway in the U.S. state of South Carolina. It travels between Yauhannah in Georgetown County to Kershaw County. Although the highway covers more east–west distance, it is signed north–south.

== Route description ==
SC 261 begins at U.S. Route 701 (US 701) at Yauhannah in Georgetown County. It travels westerly and then turns northward to end at US 521 north of Boykin in Kershaw County.

Three U.S. National Historic Landmarks—the Millford Plantation, Borough House Plantation and Church of the Holy Cross—are located on the highway in the High Hills of Santee region of Sumter County.

== Major intersections ==
County	Location	mi	km	Destinations	Notes
Georgetown	Yauhannah	0.000	0.000	US 701 (North Frasier Street) – Conway, Georgetown	Southern terminus
Georgetown		9.040	14.548	SC 513 north (Pleasant Hill Drive) / Choppee Road	Southern terminus of SC 513
Williamsburg	Hemingway	19.310	31.076	SC 41 / SC 51 (Main Street) – Johnsonville, Florence, Andrews, Georgetown	
Williamsburg	Indiantown	26.140	42.068	SC 512 east (Henry Road) – Georgetown	Southern end of SC 512 concurrency
Williamsburg		28.600	46.027	SC 512 west (Cade Road) – Cades	Northern end of SC 512 concurrency
Williamsburg	Kingstree	42.860	68.976	SC 377 south (M.L.K. Jr. Street) – Williamsburg Technical College, Lane, Andrews	Northern terminus of SC 377
Williamsburg	Kingstree	43.510	70.023	US 52 east / SC 527 (Longstreet Street) – Andrews, Lake City	Southern end of US 52 concurrency
Williamsburg		46.110	74.207	US 52 west (Williamsburg County Highway) – Charleston	Northern end of US 52 concurrency
Clarendon		64.200	103.320	US 521 south (Greeleyville Highway) – Greeleyville, Georgetown	Southern end of US 521 concurrency
Clarendon	Manning	67.160	108.084	US 521 north (Church Street)	Northern end of US 521 concurrency
Clarendon	Manning	67.250	108.228	US 301 (Brooks Street) – Summerton, Turbeville	
Clarendon	Manning	67.270	108.261	SC 260 south (Mill Street)	Northern terminus of SC 260
Clarendon		69.360– 69.389	111.624– 111.671	I-95 – Florence, Savannah	I-95 exit 119
Clarendon	Paxville	76.390	122.938	US 15 (Scott Avenue) – Summerton, Sumter	
Sumter	Pinewood	82.580	132.900	SC 120 east (West Avenue) – Sumter	Western terminus of SC 120
Sumter	Wedgefield	94.870	152.678	SC 763 north (Wedgefield Road) – Sumter	Southern terminus of SC 763
Sumter	Stateburg	98.780	158.971	US 76 / US 378 – Columbia, Sumter	
Kershaw		116.960	188.229	US 521 (Sumter Highway) – Camden, Sumter	Northern terminus
1.000 mi = 1.609 km; 1.000 km = 0.621 mi: Concurrency terminus
