= Fred Bennett =

American football player (born 1983)

No. 23, 29, 32
- Position: Defensive back

Personal information
- Born: December 31, 1983 (age 42); Manning, South Carolina, U.S.
- Listed height: 6 ft 1 in (1.85 m)
- Listed weight: 194 lb (88 kg)

Career information
- High school: Manning
- College: South Carolina
- NFL draft: 2007: 4th round, 123rd overall pick

Career history
- Houston Texans (2007–2009); San Diego Chargers (2010); Cincinnati Bengals (2010); Arizona Cardinals (2011)*; Calgary Stampeders (2012–2016); Saskatchewan Roughriders (2016)
- * Offseason or practice squad member only

Awards and highlights
- Grey Cup champion (2014); Second-team All-SEC (2006)

Career NFL statistics
- Total tackles: 125
- Forced fumbles: 4
- Fumble recoveries: 1
- Pass deflections: 21
- Interceptions: 5
- Stats at Pro Football Reference
- Stats at CFL.ca

Frederick Bennett (born December 31, 1983) is an American former professional football player who was a defensive back in the National Football League (NFL) and Canadian Football League (CFL). He was selected by the Houston Texans in the fourth round of the 2007 NFL draft. He played college football for the South Carolina Gamecocks.

Bennett was also a member of the San Diego Chargers, Cincinnati Bengals, Arizona Cardinals, Calgary Stampeders and Saskatchewan Roughriders.

== Early life ==
Bennett played high school football at Manning High School in South Carolina. He played football, basketball, and ran track. He was also selected to participate in the 2001 Shrine Bowl.

== College career ==
Bennett played college football at the University of South Carolina. He finished his career with 108 tackles, nine interceptions, and was a two-time All-American selection.

== Professional career ==
Pre-draft measurables
Height	Weight	Arm length	Hand span	40-yard dash	10-yard split	20-yard split	20-yard shuttle	Three-cone drill	Vertical jump	Broad jump	Bench press
6 ft 0 7/8 in (1.85 m)	196 lb (89 kg)	34 1/2 in (0.88 m)	9 1/4 in (0.23 m)	4.52 s	1.62 s	2.68 s	4.30 s	6.67 s	38.5 in (0.98 m)	10 ft 5 in (3.18 m)	17 reps
All values from NFL Combine

=== Houston Texans ===
Bennett was selected by the Houston Texans with the 123rd overall pick in the fourth round of the 2007 NFL draft. He replaced the injured Dunta Robinson in his rookie season, recording 62 tackles and intercepting three passes.

=== San Diego Chargers ===
After being waived in August 2010, he was claimed by the Chargers and spent the first four games of the 2010 season as a backup and special teams player.

=== Cincinnati Bengals ===
After being cut by San Diego, Bennett was claimed on November 23, 2010, by the Cincinnati Bengals to replace injured cornerback Johnathan Joseph. Bennett was released on August 27, 2011.

=== Arizona Cardinals ===
On August 29, 2011, Bennett signed with the Arizona Cardinals. He was waived on September 2.

=== Calgary Stampeders ===
On May 22, 2012, Bennett signed with the Calgary Stampeders. In his first three seasons in the CFL, Bennett totaled 129 tackles, five special teams tackles, nine interceptions and one fumble recovery. Bennett was named a 2014 West Division All-Star and won a Grey Cup later that season. On February 3, 2015, Bennett and the Stamps agreed to a contract extension.

=== Saskatchewan Roughriders ===
On August 16, 2016, Bennett was traded, along with Jeff Hecht, to the Saskatchewan Roughriders for two negotiation-list players. He was released by the Roughriders on February 1, 2017.

== NFL career statistics ==
Legend
**Bold**	Career high

Year	Team	Games		Tackles					Interceptions					Fumbles			
Year	Team	GP	GS	Cmb	Solo	Ast	Sck	TFL	Int	Yds	TD	Lng	PD	FF	FR	Yds	TD
2007	HOU	14	**8**	**62**	**54**	**8**	0.0	**1**	**3**	**47**	0	**33**	**14**	**2**	0	0	0
2008	HOU	**16**	6	43	35	**8**	0.0	0	2	26	0	23	6	**2**	0	0	0
2009	HOU	10	3	18	15	3	0.0	0	0	0	0	0	1	0	**1**	0	0
2010	SDG	4	0	1	1	0	0.0	0	0	0	0	0	0	0	0	0	0
2010	CIN	5	0	1	1	0	0.0	0	0	0	0	0	0	0	0	0	0
		49	17	125	106	19	0.0	1	5	73	0	33	21	4	1	0	0

== Healthcare fraud case ==
Bennett was charged with one count of conspiracy to commit wire fraud and health care fraud, one count of wire fraud, and one count of health care fraud by the United States Department of Justice on December 12, 2019. He initially pleaded not guilty to the charges, but changed his plea to guilty by December 2020. By February 2022, he had been sentenced to 180 days of house arrest and ordered to perform 240 hours of community service.
