= Kingsburg, South Carolina =

- Unincorporated community
- Location within South Carolina Location within the United States
- Coordinates: 33°52′50″N 79°27′07″W
- Country: United States
- State: South Carolina
- County: Florence County
- Elevation: 75 ft (23 m)
- Time zone: UTC-5 (Eastern (EST))
  - Summer (DST): UTC-4 (EDT)
- ZIP code: 29555
- Area codes: 843, 854
- GNIS feature ID: 1246254

Kingsburg is an unincorporated community in Florence County, South Carolina, United States. The community is located at the intersection of US 378, SC 41, SC 51 and River Road (S-21-57), in southeastern Florence County. Wedged between the Great Pee Dee River and Lynches River, the area is a predominantly farming community.
