= Snow's Island =

- U.S. National Register of Historic Places
- U.S. National Historic Landmark

- Location within South Carolina Location within the United States
- Location: Along the Pee Dee River, east of Johnsonville, South Carolina
- Coordinates: 33°49′39″N 79°20′38″W
- Built: 1781
- NRHP reference No.: 73001708 (original); 13000464 (increase)

Significant dates
- Added to NRHP: March 14, 1973
- Boundary increase: July 3, 2013
- Designated NHL: December 2, 1974

Snow's Island is an area of swampy lowlands along the Pee Dee River in Florence County, South Carolina. The area is historically significant as the headquarters during the American Revolutionary War for forces led by Francis Marion (1732-1795), a South Carolina militia officer who is celebrated as the "Swamp Fox." Employing guerrilla war tactics, Marion significantly contributed to the American war effort by conducting numerous raids on British outposts." The site was declared a National Historic Landmark in 1974.

== Description ==
Snow's Island is located in a remote and swampy area of Florence County, on private land south of the main channel of the Pee Dee River east of Johnsonville.

The property is not open to the public, but may be visible from the end of Dunham Bluff Road, off U.S. Route 378 on the north side of the river. The contours of the land have been altered over time due to logging activities that have changed the course of the river, and there are no definitively identified remains associated with the American Revolutionary War period.

The site was in 1780 a plantation, whose exact boundaries have not been identified, and the area has been logged several times and used as a private hunting preserve.

== Marion's stronghold ==
The area's historical significance lies in its four-month occupation by the militia forces of General Francis Marion, who orchestrated guerilla-style attacks on British targets from this base between December 1780 and March 1781. At that time, British forces dedicated to locating Marion found the camp and destroyed it; Marion and most of his band of several hundred men were not there at the time. The only known potential artifact associated with the Marion occupation is an earthen formation that may be a military defensive works.

At the time of the American Revolution, this so-called “island,” named after an early owner of the property, comprised about five square miles (metric area) of the largely undeveloped swamp bounded by the Lynches and Pee Dee rivers and Clark’s Creek.

The canopy of cypress and pines, and the dense understory of “cane breaks, briars, and vines” offered an ideal sanctuary for Marion’s rebel militia who were pursued by British and Loyalist forces seeking to eradicate them. The abundant fish and game was sufficient to sustain his soldiers numbering at their peak, perhaps 250 men. Snow’s Island, as occupied by Marion, formed a complex of multiple camps that afforded mobility to his troops in defending the stronghold, surrounded by farms of both patriot and loyalist families.

Marion’s moniker as the “Swamp Fox” is largely associated with his sojourn on Snow’s Island, eliciting comparisons to the mythology of Robin Hood and the Sherwood Forest, including legends of his largesse to patriot families from plunder taken from British and Loyalist resources. Little evidence exists that Marion was addressed as “The Swamp Fox” in his lifetime.

In early 1781, shortly after the Battle of Guilford Courthouse in March of 1781, Marion’s forces dealt a blow to British forces under John Watson Tadwell Watson at the Sampit River outside Georgetown, and just 30 miles from Snow’s Island.

While operating 30-miles south of his base at Snow Island, Marion was informed that a Loyalist force under Lieutenant John Doyle had penetrated his island refuge and overwhelmed the small patriot force left to defend it, seven who were killed. When Marion returned to assess the damage he found its supplies despoiled and structures burned. As such, he decided to abandon the former stronghold.

The only known struction associated with the Marion occupation is an earthen formation that may be a military defensive works.

== See also ==
- List of National Historic Landmarks in South Carolina
- National Register of Historic Places listings in Florence County, South Carolina

== Sources ==
- Crawford, Alan Pell. 2024. This Fierce People: The Untold Story of America’s Revolutionary War in the South. Alfred A. Knopf, New York. ISBN 978-0-593-31850-8
