= South Carolina Highway 94 =

South Carolina Highway 94 may refer to:

- South Carolina Highway 94 (1920s–1930s): a former state highway partially in Lake View
- South Carolina Highway 94 (1938–1947): a former state highway from northwest of New Zion to Coopers
