= Josephine Sprott =

Josephine Sprott (née, McLean; 1867–1952) was an American teacher and temperance advocate. She served as President of the Woman's Christian Temperance Union (WCTU) of South Carolina.

== Early life and education ==
Josephine (nickname, Josie) Hoge McLean was born at Greensboro, North Carolina, on October 19, 1867.

She was educated at the Memminger School, Charleston, South Carolina (A.B. 1887).

== Career ==
She taught for one year at Manning, South Carolina, and for two years at Jordan, South Carolina.

Sprott became interested in the cause of temperance, and affiliated with the WCTU of Manning, taking a prominent part in the local and State work of the Union. In 1906, she was elected president of the State WCTU of South Carolina, which office she held until the end of 1928.

== Personal life ==
On November 5, 1890, she married Joseph Sprott (d. May 24, 1928), of Manning, where she resided until his death. She was survived by two sons and two daughters.

From 1930 until her death, she lived in Lake Wales, Florida.

In religion, she was Methodist.

Josephine Sprott died in Tampa, Florida, on May 31, 1952. Interment was in Manning.
