= South Carolina Highway 512 =

State highway in South Carolina, United States

South Carolina Highway 512

Route information
- Maintained by SCDOT
- Length: 24.250 mi (39.027 km)

Major junctions
- West end: US 52 in Cades
- SC 261 in Indiantown
- East end: SC 513 near Hopewell

Location
- Country: United States
- State: South Carolina
- Counties: Williamsburg

Highway system
- South Carolina State Highway System; Interstate; US; State; Scenic
← US 501	→ SC 513

South Carolina Highway 512 (SC 512) is a 24.250-mile (39.027 km) state highway in the U.S. state of South Carolina. The highway connects Cades and rural areas of northeastern Williamsburg County.

== Route description ==
SC 512 begins at an intersection with U.S. Route 52 (US 52; Williamsburg County Highway) in Cades, Williamsburg County, where the roadway continues as Cade Road. It travels to the east-southeast and immediately enters the main part of Cades, where it crosses over some CSX railroad line. It continues to the east-southeast and crosses over McNamee and Paisley swamps before it intersects SC 261 (Hemingway Highway). The two highways travel concurrently to the southeast. Immediately, they cross over Boggy Swamp. They pass Battery Park Elementary School before traveling through Indiantown. Just to the east-southeast of Indiantown is where the two highways split. SC 512 travels to the southeast and crosses over Indiantown Swamp. It crosses over some railroad tracks and Poplar Hill Branch. After an intersection with SC 41/SC 51, it meets its eastern terminus, an intersection with SC 513 (County Line Road) on the Georgetown County line. Here, the roadway continues as a local road to the southeast.

== History ==
=== South Carolina Highway 94 ===
South Carolina Highway 94
- Location: New Zion–Coopers, South Carolina
- Existed: 1938–1947

South Carolina Highway 94 (SC 94) was a state highway that was established in 1938 as a renumbering of SC 41 on a path from U.S. Route 301 (US 301) west-northwest of New Zion to the community itself. In 1939, it was extended to the east-southeast to McIntosh Road in Douglas Swamp. The next year, its eastern terminus was extended to US 52 in Cades. In 1942, it was extended eastward again to SC 175 (now SC 261) in Coopers. Its western terminus was also extended to SC 54 northwest of New Zion. In 1947, it was decommissioned. Most of its path was downgraded to secondary roads. All of its path east of Cades is part of SC 512. The rest of its path is known as Salem Road and Cade Road.

== Major intersections ==
County	Location	mi	km	Destinations	Notes
Williamsburg	Cades	0.000	0.000	US 52 (Williamsburg County Highway) – Lake City, Kingstree	Western terminus
Williamsburg		12.090	19.457	SC 261 north (Hemingway Highway) – Kingstree	Western end of SC 261 concurrency
Williamsburg		14.550	23.416	SC 261 south (Hemingway Highway) – Stuckey, Hemingway	Eastern end of SC 261 concurrency
Williamsburg		23.490	37.803	SC 41 / SC 51 – Andrews, Georgetown, Charleston, Hemingway, Marion, Florence	
Williamsburg–Georgetown county line		24.250	39.027	SC 513 (County Line Road) – Andrews, Bucksport	Eastern terminus
1.000 mi = 1.609 km; 1.000 km = 0.621 mi: Concurrency terminus
