= Manning High School =

Coordinates: 33°42′07″N 80°12′42″W

Location
- 2155 Paxville Highway; Manning, (Clarendon County), South Carolina 29102; United States

Information
- Type: Public high school
- Principal: Kelvin Lemon
- Teaching staff: 38.50 (FTE)
- Enrollment: 786 (2023-2024)
- Student to teacher ratio: 20.42
- Colors: Black and gold
- Nickname: Monarchs

Manning High School is one of two high schools in Manning, South Carolina, United States. It is part of the Clarendon County's Clarendon County School District 2 and serves grades 9–12. Manning High School has approximately 870 students instructed by 39 teachers. The student body is predominantly (approximately 70%) black and a majority (approximately 70%) are eligible to receive free lunches.

== History ==
Manning maintained school systems, one for black students and one for whites until court-ordered integration caused Manning Training School (for blacks) to merge with all white Manning High School in 1970. At that time, Manning Training School became Manning Middle School, then later Manning Elementary. In response, an all-white private school, Laurence Manning Academy was created. Laurence Manning Academy remained 98% white as of 2014.
