= Effingham, South Carolina =

- Unincorporated community
- Location within South Carolina Location within the United States
- Coordinates: 34°03′29″N 79°45′11″W
- Country: United States
- State: South Carolina
- County: Florence County
- Elevation: 62 ft (19 m)
- Time zone: UTC-5 (Eastern (EST))
  - Summer (DST): UTC-4 (EDT)
- ZIP code: 29541
- Area codes: 843, 854
- GNIS feature ID: 1231263

Effingham is an unincorporated community in Florence County, South Carolina, United States. Located at the intersection of US 52, US 301 and SC 327, It is a farming community along the northern banks of the Lynches River.

McCall Farms is located in Effingham. Founded in 1838, McCall Farms owns the Margaret Holmes, Glory Foods, Bruce's Yams and Glory Farms canned and frozen foods brands. Their canning facility in Effingham employs 800. In 2006, the company added a frozen foods manufacturing facility.
