= South Carolina Highway 513 =

State highway in South Carolina, United States

South Carolina Highway 513

Route information
- Maintained by SCDOT
- Length: 8.870 mi (14.275 km)

Major junctions
- South end: SC 41 / SC 51 near Hopewell
- North end: SC 261 near Carters Crossroads

Location
- Country: United States
- State: South Carolina
- Counties: Georgetown

Highway system
- South Carolina State Highway System; Interstate; US; State; Scenic
| ← SC 512 | → SC 517 |

South Carolina Highway 513 (SC 513) is a 8.870-mile-long (14.275 km) state highway in the U.S. state of South Carolina. The highway travels through rural areas of Georgetown County.

== Route description ==
SC 513 begins at an intersection with SC 41/SC 51 (County Line Road) south-southwest of Hopewell, on the Williamsburg–Georgetown county line. It travels to the north-northeast, on the county line, and nearly immediately intersects the eastern terminus of SC 512 (Henry Road). The highway turns right onto Pleasant Hill Drive and travels to the east into Georgetown County proper. It curves to the northeast before crossing over Browns Branch. It curves to the east and east-southeast and meets its northern terminus, an intersection with SC 261 (Pleasant Hill Drive/Choppee Road) just north of Carters Crossroads.

== Major intersections ==
| County | Location | mi | km | Destinations | Notes |
|---|---|---|---|---|---|
| Williamsburg–Georgetown county line | | 0.000 | 0.000 | SC 41 (County Line Road) / SC 51 – Hemingway, Marion, Florence | Southern terminus |
| Williamsburg–Georgetown county line | | 0.810 | 1.304 | SC 512 west (Henry Road) – Hemingway | Eastern terminus of SC 512 |
| Georgetown | | 8.870 | 14.275 | SC 261 (Pleasant Hill Drive/Choppee Road) – Bucksport, Hemingway | Northern terminus |
1.000 mi = 1.609 km; 1.000 km = 0.621 mi
