= Manning Library =

- U.S. National Register of Historic Places
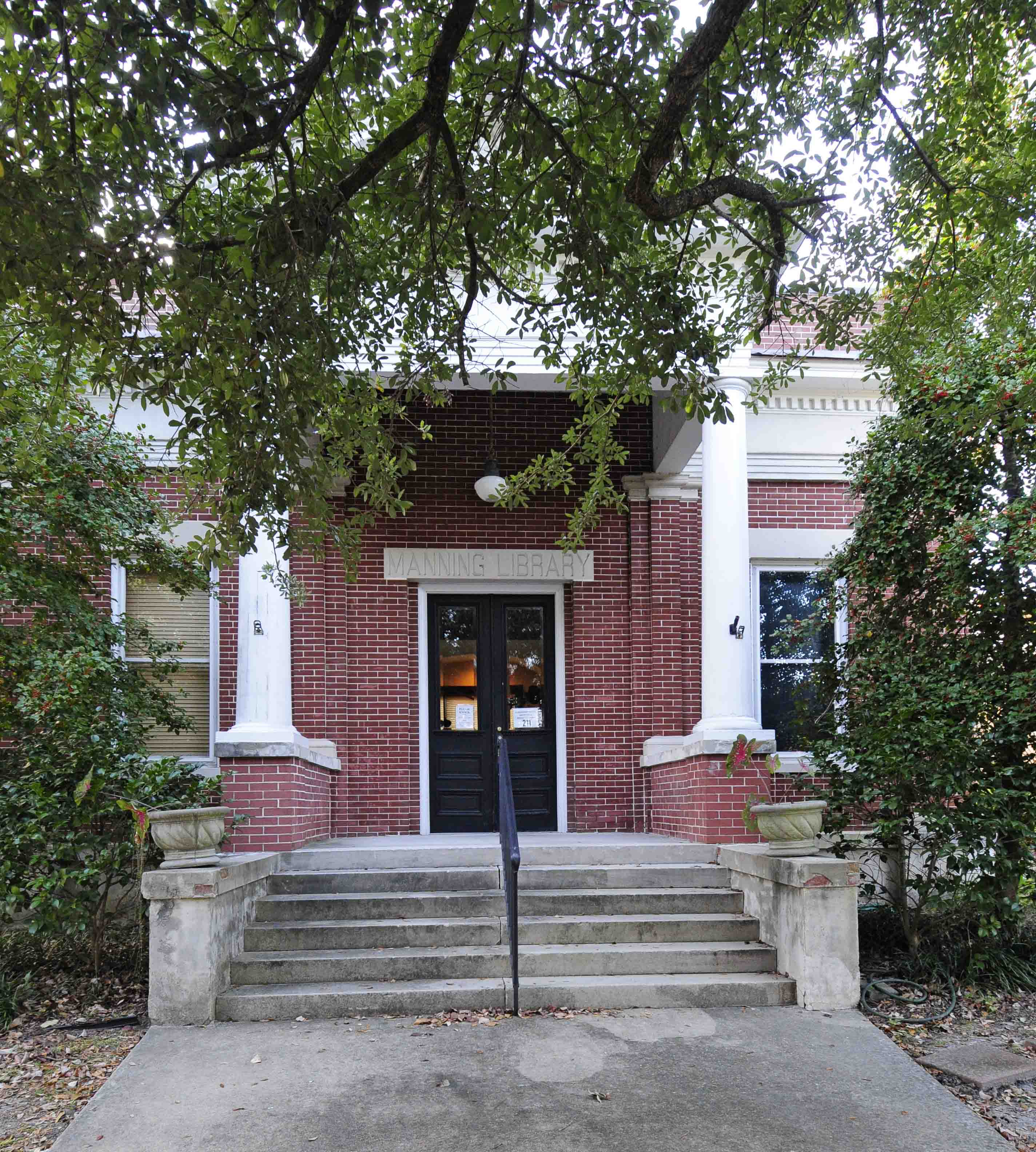
- Manning Library, November 2012

- Location within South Carolina Location within the United States
- Location: 211 N. Brooks St., Manning, South Carolina
- Coordinates: 33°41′59″N 80°12′38″W
- Area: 0.2 acres (0.081 ha)
- Built: 1909
- Architect: Shand & Lafaye
- Architectural style: Classical Revival
- NRHP reference No.: 79002381
- Added to NRHP: July 10, 1979

Manning Library, also known as Clarendon County Public Library and Hannah Levi Memorial Library, is a historic library building located at Manning, Clarendon County, South Carolina. It was built in 1909–1910, and is a one-story, brick, Classical Revival style structure is set on a raised basement. The front façade features a pedimented Roman Doric order portico projecting from the central bay. The interior is octagon shaped with a high, domed skylight. The library was the first public library in Clarendon County.

It was listed in the National Register of Historic Places in 1979.
