= Joseph W. Coker =

American politician

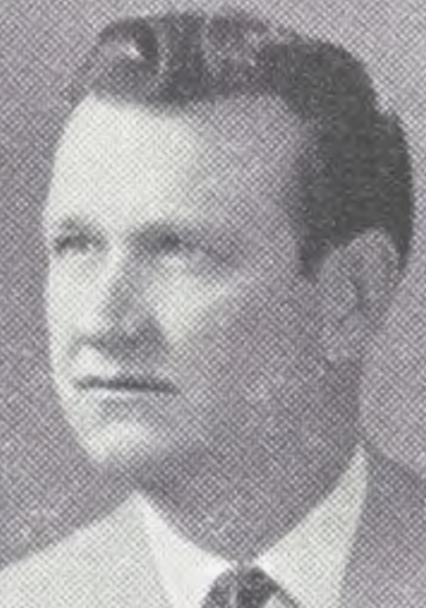
- Coker in 1971

Member of the South Carolina House of Representatives from Clarendon County
- In office 1967–1972

Personal details
- Born: Joseph Warren Coker; November 10, 1930 Manning, South Carolina, U.S.
- Died: August 26, 2019 (aged 88) South Carolina, U.S.
- Party: Democratic
- Spouse: Mary Frances Heriot
- Children: 2
- Education: University of South Carolina

Joseph Warren Coker (November 10, 1930 – August 26, 2019) was an American politician. A member of the Democratic Party, he served in the South Carolina House of Representatives from 1967 to 1972.

== Life and career ==
Coker was born in Manning, South Carolina, the son of Robert Carlisle Coker and Sarah Bradham. He served in the United States Army during the Korean War. During his military service, he was awarded the Combat Infantryman Badge, the Bronze Star and other medals. After his discharge, he attended the University of South Carolina, earning his BS degree and his master's degree in education, which after earning his degree, he worked as a teacher and coach as well as becoming a school principal, along with becoming a building contractor, owning the Turbeville Insurance Agency.

Coker served in the South Carolina House of Representatives from 1967 to 1972. After his service in the House, he served as clerk of the Clarendon County Court for two terms, before he retired.

Coker was awarded the Order of the Palmetto by South Carolina governor Carroll A. Campbell Jr. in 1994.

== Death ==
Coker died on August 26, 2019, at his home in South Carolina, at the age of 88.
