= Evergreen, South Carolina =

- Unincorporated community
- Location within South Carolina Location within the United States
- Coordinates: 34°04′07″N 79°40′44″W
- Country: United States
- State: South Carolina
- County: Florence County
- Elevation: 62 ft (19 m)
- Time zone: UTC-5 (Eastern (EST))
  - Summer (DST): UTC-4 (EDT)
- ZIP code: 29583
- Area codes: 843, 854
- GNIS feature ID: 1222312

Evergreen is an unincorporated community in Florence County, South Carolina, United States. The community is located at the intersection of SC 51, SC 327 and Lebanon Road (S-21-149), halfway between Florence and Pamplico.
