= Paxville, South Carolina =

- Town
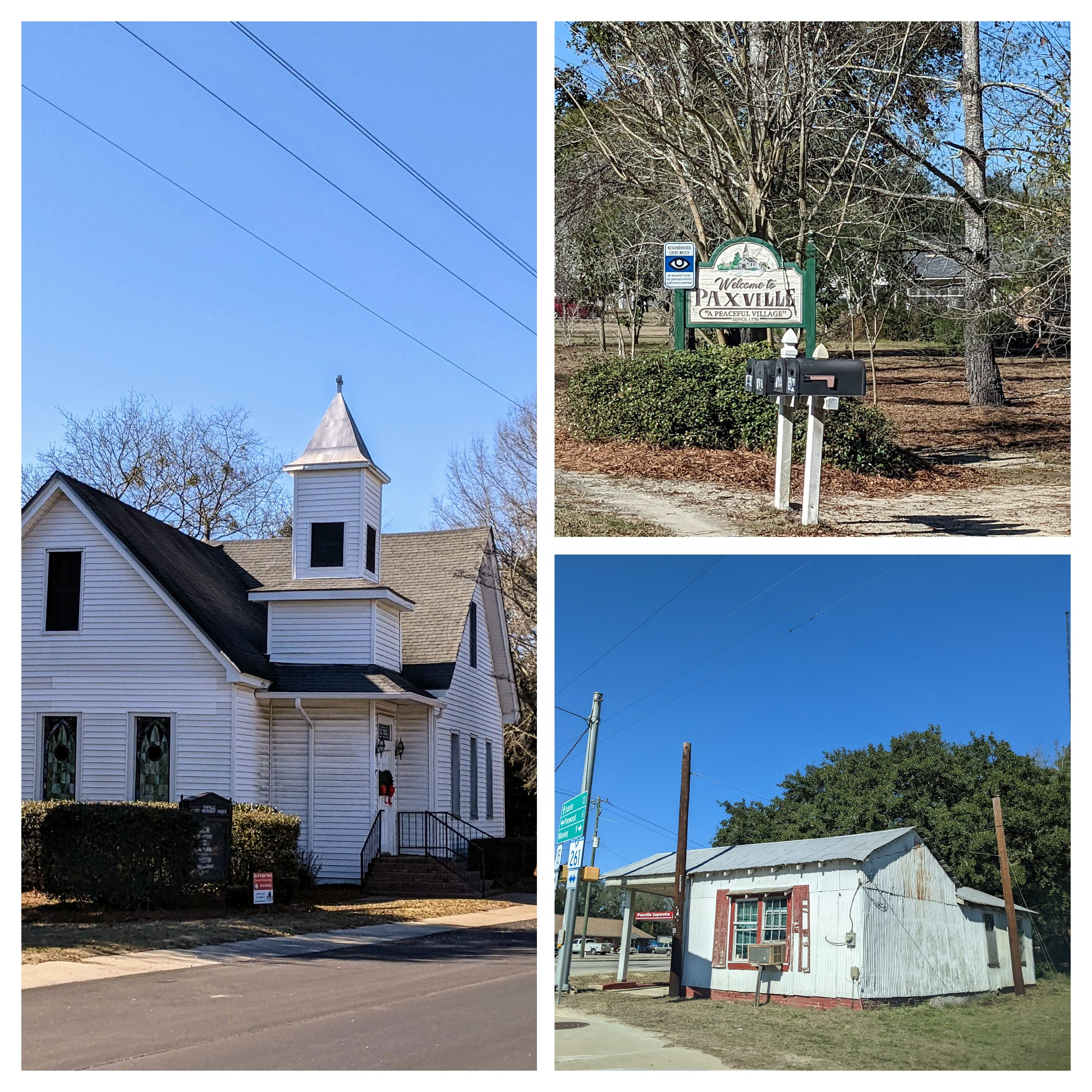
- Views of downtown Paxville

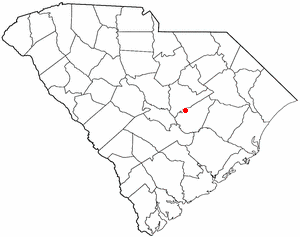
- Location of Paxville, South Carolina
- Coordinates: 33°44′21″N 80°21′31″W
- Country: United States
- State: South Carolina
- County: Clarendon

Area
  - Total: 1.05 sq mi (2.72 km^{2})
  - Land: 1.05 sq mi (2.72 km^{2})
  - Water: 0 sq mi (0.00 km^{2})
- Elevation: 184 ft (56 m)

Population (2020)
  - Total: 232
  - Density: 220.8/sq mi (85.27/km^{2})
- Time zone: UTC-5 (Eastern (EST))
  - Summer (DST): UTC-4 (EDT)
- ZIP code: 29102
- Area codes: 803, 839
- FIPS code: 45-55060
- GNIS feature ID: 2407084

Paxville is a town in Clarendon County, South Carolina, United States. The population was 185 at the 2010 census, down from 248 in 2000. The town was named after Joseph Pack.

== History ==
Joseph Pack and his wife, Louisa Alexandria Pack, arrived in America from England in the year 1770. He became one of the most extensive land holders in the Carolina Low Country, having acquired more than 10,000 acres (4,000 ha) of land. He helped found the town of Packsville (later renamed Paxville in 1902). Paxville is believed to be the oldest town in Clarendon County.

Some of the land grants given to Joseph Pack were from King George III the United Kingdom, while others were from the state of South Carolina. Some of the land grants in Paxville may have been given to Joseph as a result of his Revolutionary War service. There is a marker honoring Joseph Pack's service with the South Carolina Militia during the Revolutionary War.

Joseph and Louisa raised a family of six boys and six girls. Joseph Pack died in 1827 and his wife Louisa followed in 1832. Joseph Pack is buried in the Paxville Cemetery.

== Geography ==
Paxville is located in western Clarendon County. U.S. Route 15 passes through the town, leading north 14 miles (23 km) to Sumter and south 9 miles (14 km) to Summerton. South Carolina Highway 261 crosses US 15 in the center of town and leads west 6 miles (10 km) to Pinewood and east 9 miles (14 km) to Manning, the county seat.

According to the United States Census Bureau, the town has a total area of 1.0 square mile (2.7 km^{2}), all land.

== Demographics ==
Historical population
Census	Pop.	Note	%±
1910	175		—
1920	185		5.7%
1930	170		−8.1%
1940	194		14.1%
1950	208		7.2%
1960	216		3.8%
1970	261		20.8%
1980	244		−6.5%
1990	218		−10.7%
2000	248		13.8%
2010	185		−25.4%
2020	232		25.4%
U.S. Decennial Census

As of the census of 2000, there were 248 people, 100 households, and 73 families residing in the town. The population density was 236.8 inhabitants per square mile (91.4/km^{2}). There were 110 housing units at an average density of 105.0 per square mile (40.5/km^{2}). The racial makeup of the town was 64.92% White, 33.87% African American, 0.40% from other races, and 0.81% from two or more races.

There were 100 households, out of which 32.0% had children under the age of 18 living with them, 53.0% were married couples living together, 19.0% had a female householder with no husband present, and 27.0% were non-families. 26.0% of all households were made up of individuals, and 14.0% had someone living alone who was 65 years of age or older. The average household size was 2.48 and the average family size was 2.93.

In the town, the population was spread out, with 24.2% under the age of 18, 6.5% from 18 to 24, 27.4% from 25 to 44, 25.4% from 45 to 64, and 16.5% who were 65 years of age or older. The median age was 40 years. For every 100 females, there were 90.8 males. For every 100 females age 18 and over, there were 82.5 males.

The median income for a household in the town was $28,438, and the median income for a family was $37,500. Males had a median income of $26,094 versus $22,917 for females. The per capita income for the town was $16,390. About 9.4% of families and 20.4% of the population were below the poverty line, including 34.3% of those under the age of eighteen and 22.4% of those 65 or over.

== Education ==
The school district is Clarendon School District 2.
