= Pamplico, South Carolina =

- Town
- House on SC 51 in Pamplico

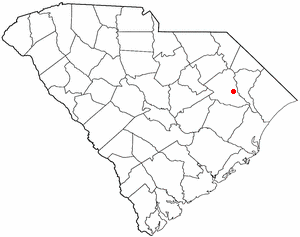
- Location of Pamplico in South Carolina
- Coordinates: 33°59′57″N 79°34′06″W
- Country: United States
- State: South Carolina
- County: Florence

Area
  - Total: 1.63 sq mi (4.22 km^{2})
  - Land: 1.62 sq mi (4.20 km^{2})
  - Water: 0.012 sq mi (0.03 km^{2})
- Elevation: 82 ft (25 m)

Population (2020)
  - Total: 1,061
  - Density: 655.0/sq mi (252.91/km^{2})
- Time zone: UTC-5 (EST)
  - Summer (DST): UTC-4 (EDT)
- ZIP code: 29583
- Area codes: 843, 854
- FIPS code: 45-54340
- GNIS feature ID: 2407071
- Website: www.pamplicosc.gov

Pamplico is a town in southeastern Florence County, South Carolina, United States. As of the 2020 census, Pamplico had a population of 1,061. It is part of the Florence Metropolitan Statistical Area.

== Geography ==
Pamplico is located in eastern Florence County and is located 3 miles (5 km) west of the Pee Dee River and 19 miles (31 km) southeast of Florence, the county seat. South Carolina Highway 51, a secondary thoroughfare for traffic to Myrtle Beach, passes through the town center. Myrtle Beach is 51 miles (82 km) to the southeast.

According to the United States Census Bureau, the town has a total area of 1.6 square miles (4.2 km^{2}), of which 0.01 square miles (0.03 km^{2}), or 0.68%, is water.

== Demographics ==
Historical population
Census	Pop.	Note	%±
1920	452		—
1930	467		3.3%
1940	555		18.8%
1950	728		31.2%
1960	988		35.7%
1970	1,068		8.1%
1980	1,213		13.6%
1990	1,314		8.3%
2000	1,139		−13.3%
2010	1,226		7.6%
2020	1,061		−13.5%
U.S. Decennial Census

=== 2020 census ===
Pamplico town, South Carolina – Racial and ethnic composition Note: the US Census treats Hispanic/Latino as an ethnic category. This table excludes Latinos from the racial categories and assigns them to a separate category. Hispanics/Latinos may be of any race.
Race / Ethnicity (NH = Non-Hispanic)	Pop 2000	Pop 2010	Pop 2020	% 2000	% 2010	% 2020
White alone (NH)	513	491	455	45.04%	40.05%	42.88%
Black or African American alone (NH)	594	672	519	52.15%	54.81%	48.92%
Native American or Alaska Native alone (NH)	4	4	5	0.35%	0.33%	0.47%
Asian alone (NH)	1	2	8	0.09%	0.16%	0.75%
Pacific Islander alone (NH)	0	0	0	0.00%	0.00%	0.00%
Other race alone (NH)	0	0	4	0.00%	0.00%	0.38%
Mixed race or Multiracial (NH)	10	14	48	0.88%	1.14%	4.52%
Hispanic or Latino (any race)	17	43	22	1.49%	3.51%	2.07%
Total	1,139	1,226	1,061	100.00%	100.00%	100.00%

=== 2000 Census ===
As of the census of 2000, there were 1,139 people, 419 households, and 323 families residing in the town. The population density was 615.2 inhabitants per square mile (237.5/km^{2}). There were 463 housing units at an average density of 250.1 per square mile (96.6/km^{2}). The racial makeup of the town was 45.04% White, 52.50% African American, 0.35% Native American, 0.09% Asian, 1.05% from other races, and 0.97% from two or more races. Hispanic or Latino of any race were 1.49% of the population.

There were 419 households, out of which 36.3% had children under the age of 18 living with them, 44.2% were married couples living together, 26.7% had a female householder with no husband present, and 22.9% were non-families. 20.3% of all households were made up of individuals, and 8.1% had someone living alone who was 65 years of age or older. The average household size was 2.70 and the average family size was 3.11.

In the town, the population was spread out, with 28.7% under the age of 18, 10.4% from 18 to 24, 24.8% from 25 to 44, 23.6% from 45 to 64, and 12.5% who were 65 years of age or older. The median age was 34 years. For every 100 females, there were 89.5 males. For every 100 females age 18 and over, there were 85.0 males.

The median income for a household in the town was $28,304, and the median income for a family was $31,618. Males had a median income of $27,000 versus $24,028 for females. The per capita income for the town was $14,233. About 26.8% of families and 31.7% of the population were below the poverty line, including 50.8% of those under age 18 and 15.2% of those age 65 or over.

== Education ==
Public education in Pamplico is administered by Florence County School District 2. The district operates Hannah-Pamplico Elementary/Middle School and Hannah-Pamplico High School on a single campus.

Pamplico has a public library, a branch of the Florence County Library System.

== Notable people ==
- Ken Ard, former South Carolina lieutenant governor
- Sam Ard, racing driver
- Josh Turner, Country music artist
