= Special routes of U.S. Route 52 =

Special routes of U.S. Route 52

Highway system
- United States Numbered Highway System; List; Special; Divided

Several special routes of U.S. Route 52 exist, from North Dakota to South Carolina. In order from northwest to southeast, they are as follows.

== North Dakota ==
=== Minot business loop ===
U.S. Highway 52 Business
- Location: Minot, North Dakota

=== Harvey business loop ===
U.S. Highway 52 Business
- Location: Harvey, North Dakota
- Length: 2 mi (3.2 km)

U.S. Route 52 Business is a 2-mile-long (3.2 km) business route of U.S. Route 52 in Harvey, North Dakota. It runs from U.S. Route 52 in Harvey to U.S. Route 52/North Dakota Highway 3.

=== Jamestown truck bypass route ===
U.S. Route 52 Truck Bypass
- Location: Jamestown, North Dakota

Major junctions

The entire route is in Stutsman County.

Location	mi	km	Exit	Destinations	Notes
	0.00	0.00		US 52 / US 281 – Carrington, Jamestown US 281 Truck (By-pass) begins	Western terminus of US 52 Truck Byp.; northern terminus of US 281 Truck Byp.; west end of US 281 Truck Byp. concurrency
Jamestown	3.4– 3.8	5.5– 6.1		I-94 west – Bismarck	West end of I-94 concurrency; I-94 exit 256
Jamestown	4.3	6.9	257	Jamestown	Exit numbers follow I-94; eastbound left exit and westbound entrance
Jamestown	5.3– 5.7	8.5– 9.2	258	US 281 Truck (By-pass) south US 52 west / US 281 – Jamestown	Eastern end of US 281 Truck Byp. concurrency
Jamestown	5.3– 5.7	8.5– 9.2		I-94 / US 52 east – Fargo	East end of I-94 concurrency; continuation beyond eastern terminus
1.000 mi = 1.609 km; 1.000 km = 0.621 mi: Concurrency terminus; Incomplete access

== Iowa ==
=== Iowa alternate route ===
U.S. Highway 52 Alternate
- Location: Luxemburg–Dubuque
- Length: 26.82 mi (43.16 km)
- Existed: 1964–1968

U.S. Highway 52 Alternate (US 52 Alt.) existed in northeastern Iowa in the 1960s. The original pavement on US 52 between Dubuque and Luxemburg was in such poor condition that in 1964, the Iowa State Highway Commission temporarily rerouted US 52. It was rerouted along US 20 and Iowa Highway 136. As a result of this, the alternate route was then established along the old route. Once comprehensive repairs were made to the roadway by 1968, the mainline designation was restored to the routing.

The entire route was in Dubuque County.

Location	mi	km	Destinations	Notes
Luxemburg	0.00	0.00	US 52 west / Iowa 136 south / Iowa 3 – Dyersville, Colesburg, Guttenberg	Western end of Iowa 3 overlap
Sageville	21.17	34.07	Iowa 386 east	
Sageville	22.75	36.61	Iowa 386 north (John Deere Road)	
Dubuque	25.22	40.59	US 61 north / US 151 north (20th Street) – Wisconsin	Western end of US 61 / US 151 overlap
Dubuque	26.45	42.57	US 61 north / US 151 north / US 52 Alt. north / Iowa 3 north (Locust Street)	Other half of one-way couplet
Dubuque	26.82	43.16	US 20 (Dodge Street) / US 52 / US 61 south / US 67 south / US 151 south (Locust Street) / Iowa 3 ends	Eastern end of US 61 / US 151 and Iowa 3 overlaps
1.000 mi = 1.609 km; 1.000 km = 0.621 mi: Concurrency terminus

== Ohio ==
=== Ironton business loop ===
U.S. Route 52 Business
- Location: Ironton, Ohio

U.S. Route 52 Business is a special business route of U.S. Route 52 in Ironton, Ohio. U.S. Route 52 Business exits the mainline route at the village of Coal Grove, just south of Ironton then follows the original pre-1962 routing of U.S. 52 through the central business district of Ironton before rejoining the mainline near Hanging Rock. U.S. 52 mainline was moved to its current alignment in 1962, which is a controlled-access 4-lane highway which bypasses the city itself. The business route was established at that time but was poorly signed for many years until 1999 when an effort to improve signage was completed. Since then it has been sufficiently signed as U.S. Route 52 Business.

== West Virginia ==
=== Williamson truck route ===
U.S. Route 52 Truck
- Location: Williamson, West Virginia

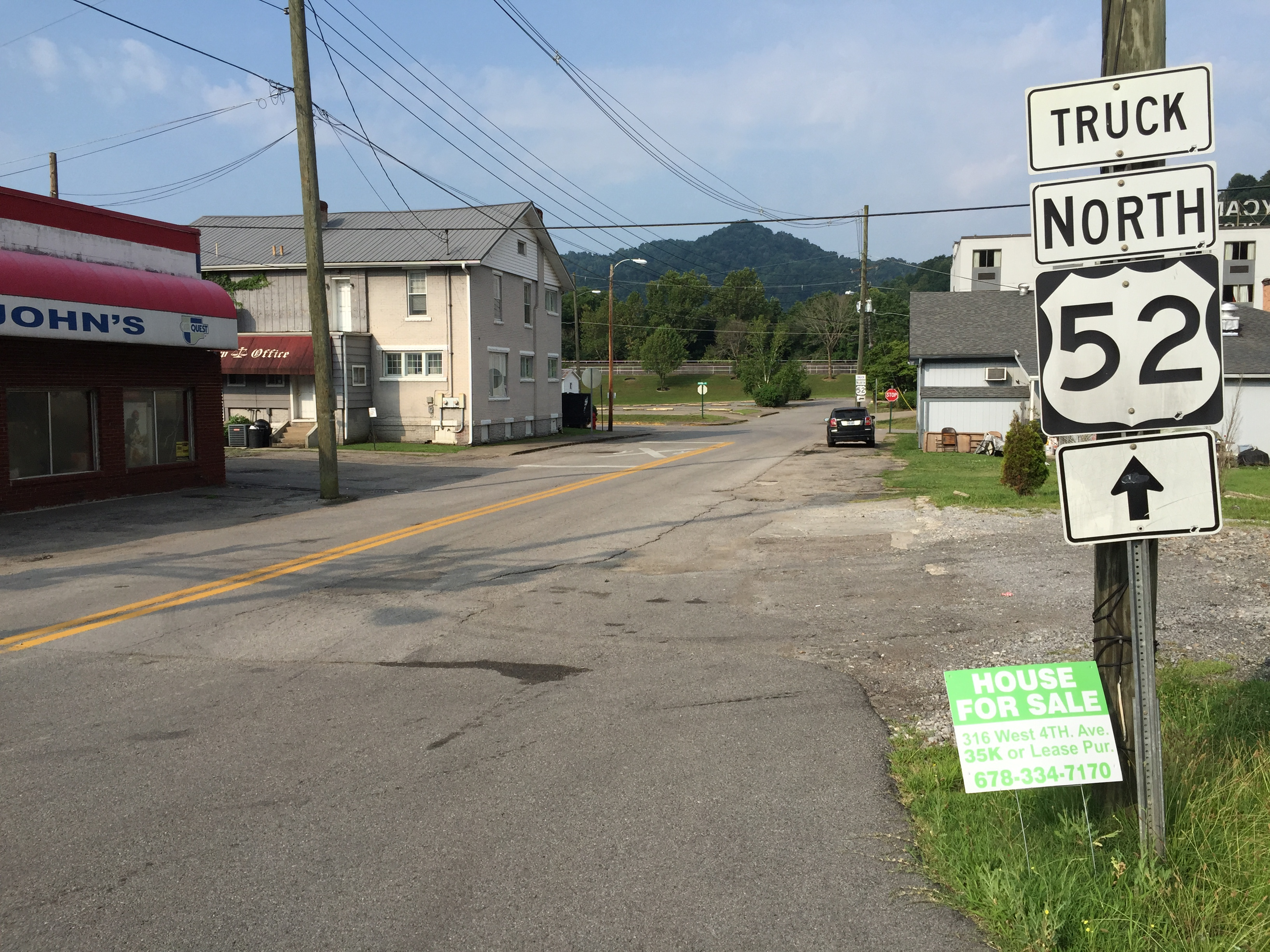
View north along US 52 Truck in Williamson

=== Welch alternate route ===
U.S. Route 52 Alternate
- Location: Welch, West Virginia
- Length: 2.3 mi (3.7 km)
- Existed: circa 1950–present

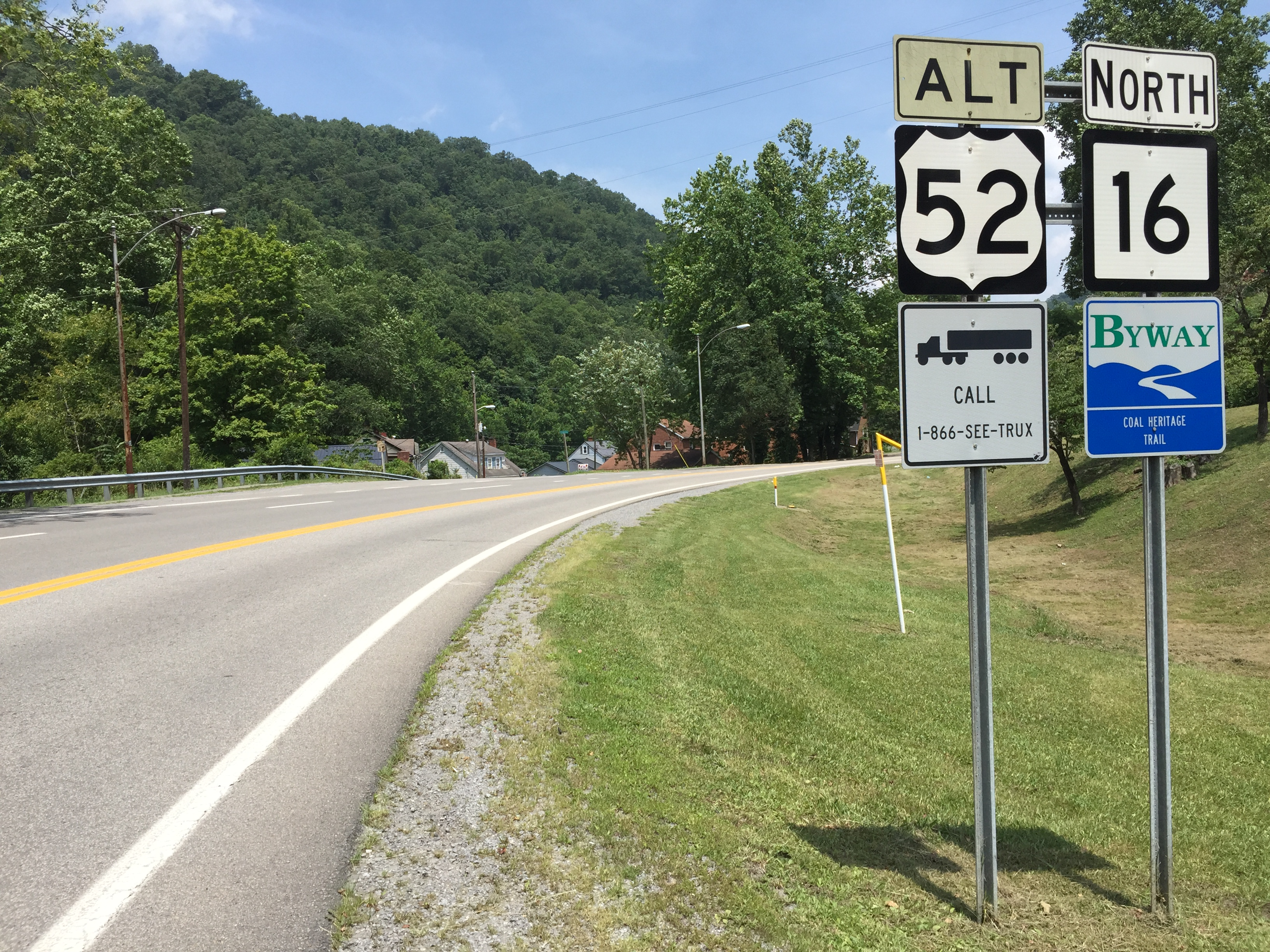
View south along US 52 Alt. and north along WV 16 in Welch

US 52's Welch Alternate route follows the original path of US 52 through town prior to construction of the Welch bypass around 1950. The route follows West Virginia Route 16 along with portions of Virginia Avenue and other streets.

=== Bluefield truck route ===
U.S. Route 52 Truck
- Location: Bluefield, West Virginia

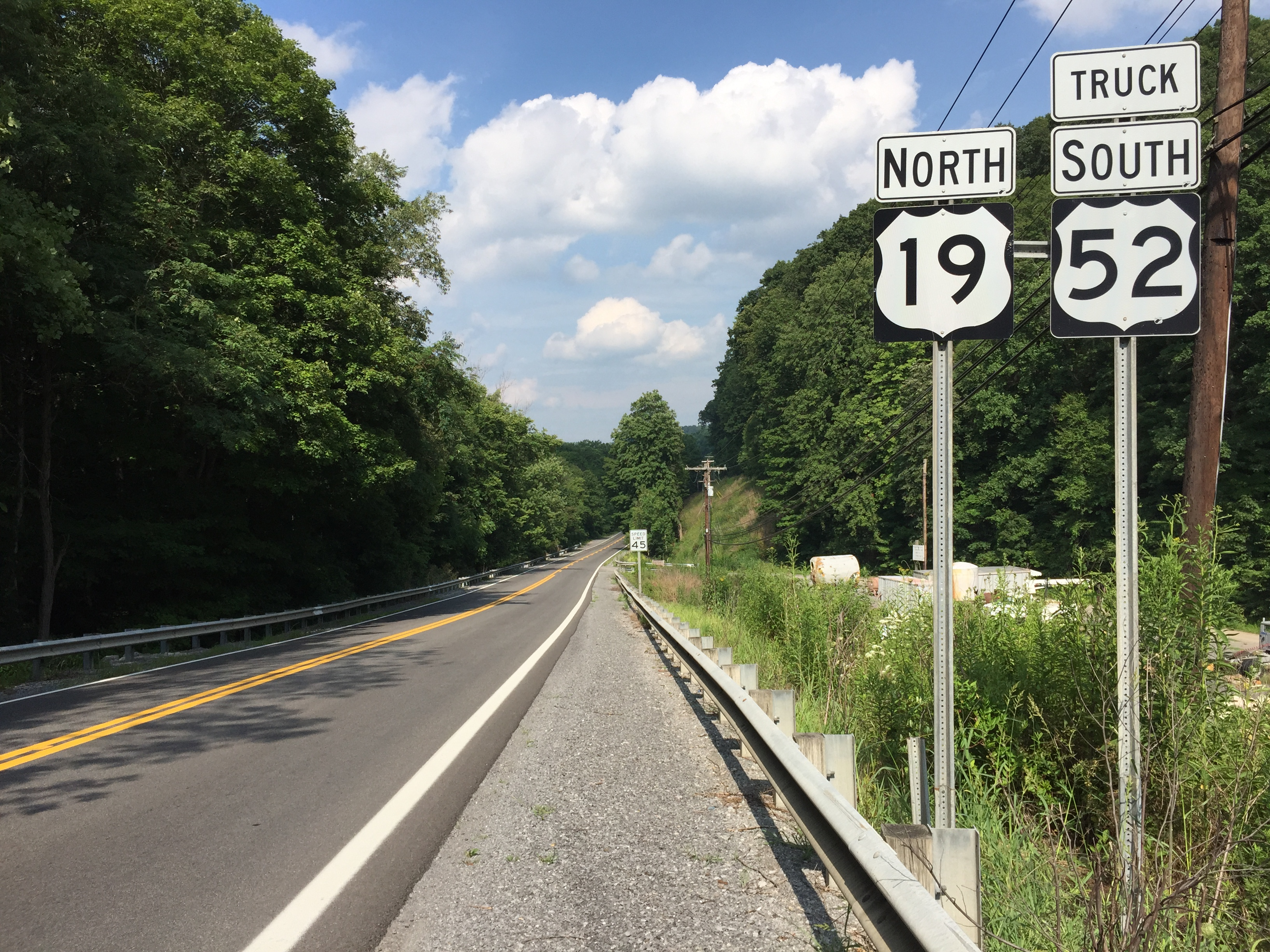
View south along US 52 Truck and north along US 19 just northeast of Bluefield

U.S. Route 52 Truck follows US 19 from the edge of downtown Bluefield to US 460, a 4-lane highway which it then follows back to regular US 52. The truck route bypasses several 90-degree turns and a residential neighborhood.

== North Carolina ==
=== Mount Airy alternate route ===
U.S. Highway 52A
- Location: Mount Airy, North Carolina
- Existed: 1953–1960

U.S. Route 52A was established in 1953, replacing the old mainline US 52 through downtown Mount Airy, via Main Street. It was renumbered in 1960 as US 52 Business.

=== Mount Airy business loop ===
U.S. Highway 52 Business
- Location: Mount Airy, North Carolina
- Length: 5.4 mi (8.7 km)
- Existed: 1960–present

U.S. Route 52 Business was established in 1960, a renumbering of US 52A through downtown Mount Airy, via Main Street, Renfro Street, and Lebanon Street. Between 1963 and 1967, US 52 Business was split on one-way streets: northbound via Cherry and Renfro Streets, southbound via Main Street. Sometime between 1969 and 1972, southbound US 52 Business was removed from Main and Cherry Streets, and moved onto an extended Renfro Street.

=== Pilot Mountain alternate route ===
U.S. Highway 52A
- Location: Pilot Mountain, North Carolina
- Existed: 1949–1960

U.S. Route 52A was established in 1949, replacing the old mainline US 52 through Pilot Mountain, via Main Street. It was renumbered in 1960 as US 52 Business.

=== Pilot Mountain business loop ===
U.S. Highway 52 Business
- Location: Pilot Mountain, North Carolina
- Existed: 1960–1964

U.S. Route 52 Business was established in 1960, a renumbering of US 52A through Pilot Mountain, via Main Street. It was decommissioned in 1964 when the Pilot Mountain Parkway was opened, taking US 52 onto a new alignment west of town.

=== Albemarle business loop ===
U.S. Highway 52 Business
- Location: Albemarle, North Carolina
- Length: 2.1 mi (3.4 km)
- Existed: mid-1990s–present

U.S. Route 52 Business was established in the mid-1990s, it goes through downtown Albemarle, via First Street.

== South Carolina ==
=== Cheraw truck route ===
U.S. Highway 52 Truck
- Location: Cheraw, South Carolina
- Length: 3.550 mi (5.713 km)
- Existed: 2002–present

U.S. Route 52 Truck (US 52 Truck) is a 3.550-mile (5.713 km) truck route of US 52 that has about half of its path within the city limits of Cheraw. All but the northernmost 0.320 miles (0.515 km) of its path is concurrent with US 1 Truck.

=== Florence truck route ===
U.S. Highway 52 Truck
- Location: Florence, South Carolina
- Length: 4.780 mi (7.693 km)

U.S. Route 52 Truck (US 52 Truck) is a 4.780-mile (7.693 km) truck route of US 52 that is mostly within the city limits of Florence, South Carolina. It is mostly unsigned. It begins concurrent with US 301 (Freedom Boulevard, which is signed as a US 301 truck route), but branches off on its own.

=== Florence connector route ===
U.S. Highway 52 Connector
- Location: Florence, South Carolina
- Length: 1.070 mi (1.722 km)

U.S. Route 52 Connector (US 52 Conn.) is a 1.070-mile (1.722 km) connector route of US 52 that is entirely within the city limits of Florence, South Carolina. It has a one-block-long concurrency with US 76 (West Palmetto Street). The rest of the highway uses Coit Street. It is unsigned.

=== Darlington business loop ===
U.S. Highway 52 Business
- Location: Darlington, South Carolina
- Length: 4.508 mi (7.255 km)

U.S. Route 52 Business (US 52 Bus.) is a 4.508-mile (7.255 km) business route of US 52 that has most of its length within the city limits of Darlington. Except for its termini, the only other major intersection is that with SC 34/SC 151 at SC 151's southern terminus.

=== North Charleston connector route ===
U.S. Highway 52 Connector
- Location: North Charleston, South Carolina
- Length: 0.900 mi (1,448 m)

U.S. Route 52 Connector (US 52 Conn.) is a 0.900-mile (1.448 km) connector route of US 52 that has its entire length within the city limits of North Charleston. It is a short freeway that connects Interstate 26 (I-26) and US 52/US 78 (Rivers Avenue). Except for its termini, it has no other major interchanges. It is an unsigned highway.

=== Charleston spur route ===
U.S. Highway 52 Spur
- Location: Charleston, South Carolina
- Length: 2.980 mi (4.796 km)
- Existed: early 1950s–present

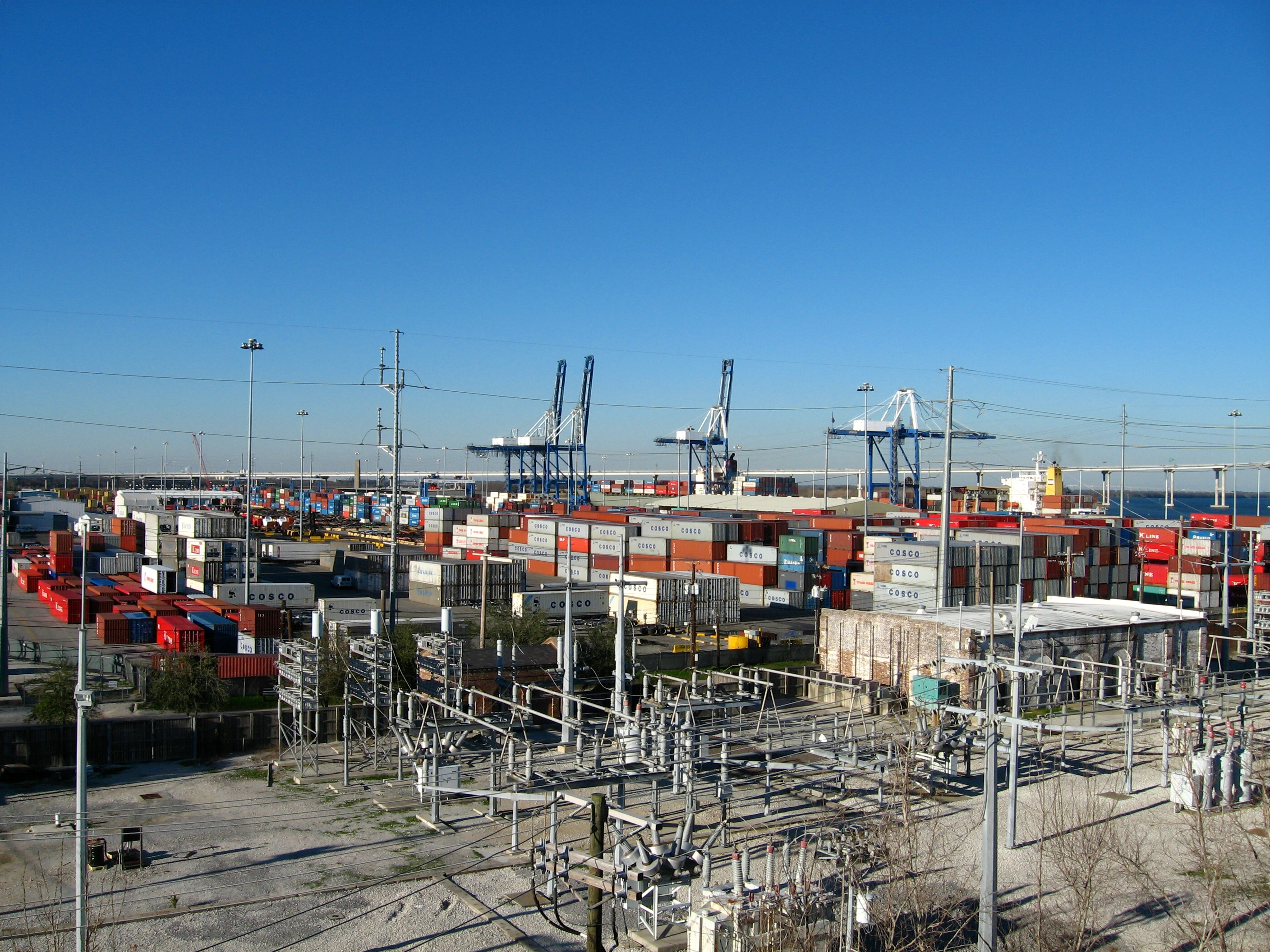
Columbus Street Terminal viewed from the southwest

U.S. Route 52 Spur (US 52 Spur) is an unsigned 2.980-mile (4.796 km) long spur route of US 52 in Charleston, South Carolina. It extends from Broad Street to US 52 (where it is named Meeting Street) along the northeastern side of the peninsula of downtown Charleston. The highway provides access for trucks to shipping terminals of the Port of Charleston on the Charleston peninsula: Union Pier and Columbus Street.

The entire length of the highway is in the city of Charleston. 1.290 miles (2.076 km) of the route is named Morrison Drive and the remaining 1.690 miles (2.720 km) is named East Bay Street.

One section of the route, Morrison Drive near Jackson Street, will flood regularly during a spring tide. The southern terminus is near the historic wharves of Charleston, including Adgers Wharf, which is now the site of a playground. It is also adjacent to the Old Exchange, or Customs House, of Charleston. The current Customs House that was built around the time of the Civil War is on this route.

The section named Morrison Drive was constructed in the early 1950s. It was named for William McG. Morrison, mayor of Charleston from 1953 to 1954.

When Morrison Drive was constructed, there was still one private terminal operating near the southern terminus, the Clydeline Steamship Company. The Clydeline terminal burned down in 1955. In the late 1980s, the land of the terminal was rebuilt as Waterfront Park.

== See also ==
- List of special routes of the United States Numbered Highway System
