= Laurence Manning Academy =

Segregation Academy in South Carolina

Coordinates: 33.70915°N 80.22028°W

Laurence Manning Academy is a private school in Manning, South Carolina. It was founded as a White-only school shortly after the integration of public schools and remains almost completely White.

== History ==
In 1972, organizers chose the name Laurence Manning after revolutionary war hero Laurence Manning, the grandfather of John Laurence Manning, for whom the town was named. Laurence Manning Academy was first accredited by SCISA in 1973, an organization that was set up to legitimize segregation academies.

In 1979 two students from another private school in Manning burned LMA's main building to the ground.

As of 1990, the IRS had still not granted tax-exempt status to LMA because it was considered a segregated school.

== Organizations ==
The school is a chapter of the National Beta Club.

== Sports ==
The school offers the following sports: Baseball, Basketball, Football, Soccer and Softball.

The Billy Chitwood Memorial Field (formerly known as Swampcat Field) hosts the academy's football teams. It was posthumously-renamed in 1976 after one of the academy's inaugural students and athletes: James William "Billy" Chitwood, who had passed away two years prior from injuries received in an automobile accident.

The Bubba Davis Gymnasium hosts the school's basketball teams. It was ceremoniously-named and dedicated on November 25, 2003 after Thomas Marion "Bubba" Davis, Jr., a longtime staff member of the academy.

The Julie Skoler Memorial Field hosts the academy's softball teams. It was ceremoniously-dedicated and named on April 30, 2004 after another one of the academy's inaugural students and athletes: Julie Carole Skoler, who had passed away in 1976 from complications of injuries received in an automobile accident three weeks prior.

=== Retired numbers ===
The Swampcats have retired three of its numbers in the history of its franchise:

- [3] Julie Skoler (Basketball and Softball)
- [33] Thomas "Bubba" Davis (Basketball)
- [51] Billy Chitwood (Football)

== Demographics ==
As of the 2019–2020 school year, 890 of 927 or 96% of students in Kindergarten through grade 12 were White while 23, or less than 2.5% were Black. The public school district, Clarendon 02, had a student body population that was 47% Black and 46% White.
