= Johnsonville, South Carolina =

- City
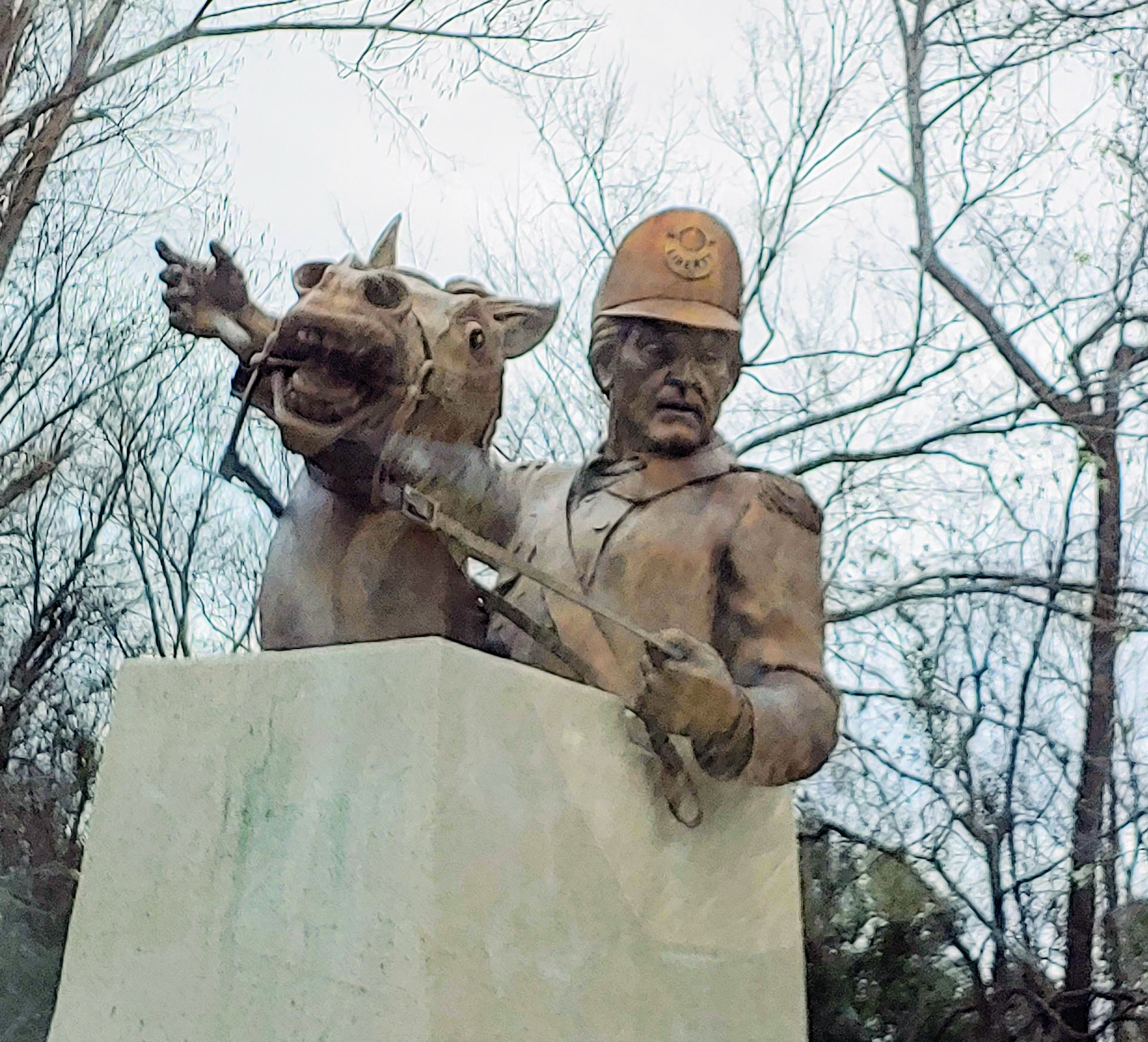
- Francis Marion statue at Venters Landing Johnsonville, South Carolina
- Motto: "Outpost to the Coast"
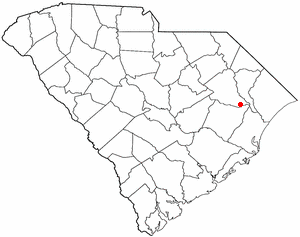
- Location of Johnsonville in South Carolina
- Coordinates: 33°48′55″N 79°26′40″W
- Country: United States
- State: South Carolina
- County: Florence

Area
  - Total: 2.14 sq mi (5.55 km^{2})
  - Land: 2.12 sq mi (5.48 km^{2})
  - Water: 0.027 sq mi (0.07 km^{2})
- Elevation: 85 ft (26 m)

Population (2020)
  - Total: 1,378
  - Density: 651.8/sq mi (251.68/km^{2})
- Time zone: UTC-5 (EST)
  - Summer (DST): UTC-4 (EDT)
- ZIP code: 29555
- Area codes: 843, 854
- FIPS code: 45-37105
- GNIS feature ID: 2404809
- Website: www.cityofjohnsonville.com

Johnsonville is a city in Florence County, South Carolina, United States. As of the 2020 census, Johnsonville had a population of 1,378. It is part of the Florence Metropolitan Statistical Area.

The city was founded in 1913 west of the spot of the former Witherspoon's Ferry on Lynches River, where General Francis Marion received his commission for the Revolutionary War.

== History ==
Statue of General Francis Marion at Venters Landing

In use during the American Revolution, Witherspoon's Ferry was the site where Francis Marion accepted command of the Williamsburg Militia in 1780. Ownership of the ferry lands passed from Robert to John Witherspoon in 1787. In 1802, John bequeathed the land to Aimwell Presbyterian Church.

Witherspoon's Ferry was a strategic ferry in the northeastern area of Williamsburg County, vested in John Witherspoon in 1801 and remaining in his charge until his death in 1815. According to the terms of John Witherspoon's will, the ferry was vested in J.D. Witherspoon, executor, for a term of 14 years, "in trust for and having the sole benefit of the incorporated Presbyterian Church at Aimwell on the Pee Dee River."

In 1819, former South Carolina Governor David R. Williams, son-in-law of John Witherspoon, obtained these ferry lands. William J. Johnson, born 1787, succeeded J.D. Witherspoon at the ferry after purchasing the plantation in 1825 from the Witherspoon estate. The 1850 census of Williamsburg County shows William Johnson, a man of considerable wealth for his time and place, living just below where the American Legion stands in Johnsonville today.

Johnson's Ferry was a stagecoach horse changeover and meal break station. As the stagecoach passed east over the Lynches River on the ferry, a Johnson slave in charge of the ferry mules announced the number of passengers with a blast from a fox horn: one blast for each passenger, thus informing Mrs. Johnson of the number of places that should be set for dinner.

The stagecoach stopped at the Johnsons' house. All the mail for the surrounding communities was left in Capt. Johnson's care. This provided an excellent reason for him to request a post office be granted. In 1843, a post office named Johnsonville was established near the ferry.

The city of Johnsonville was incorporated in 1913.

== Geography ==
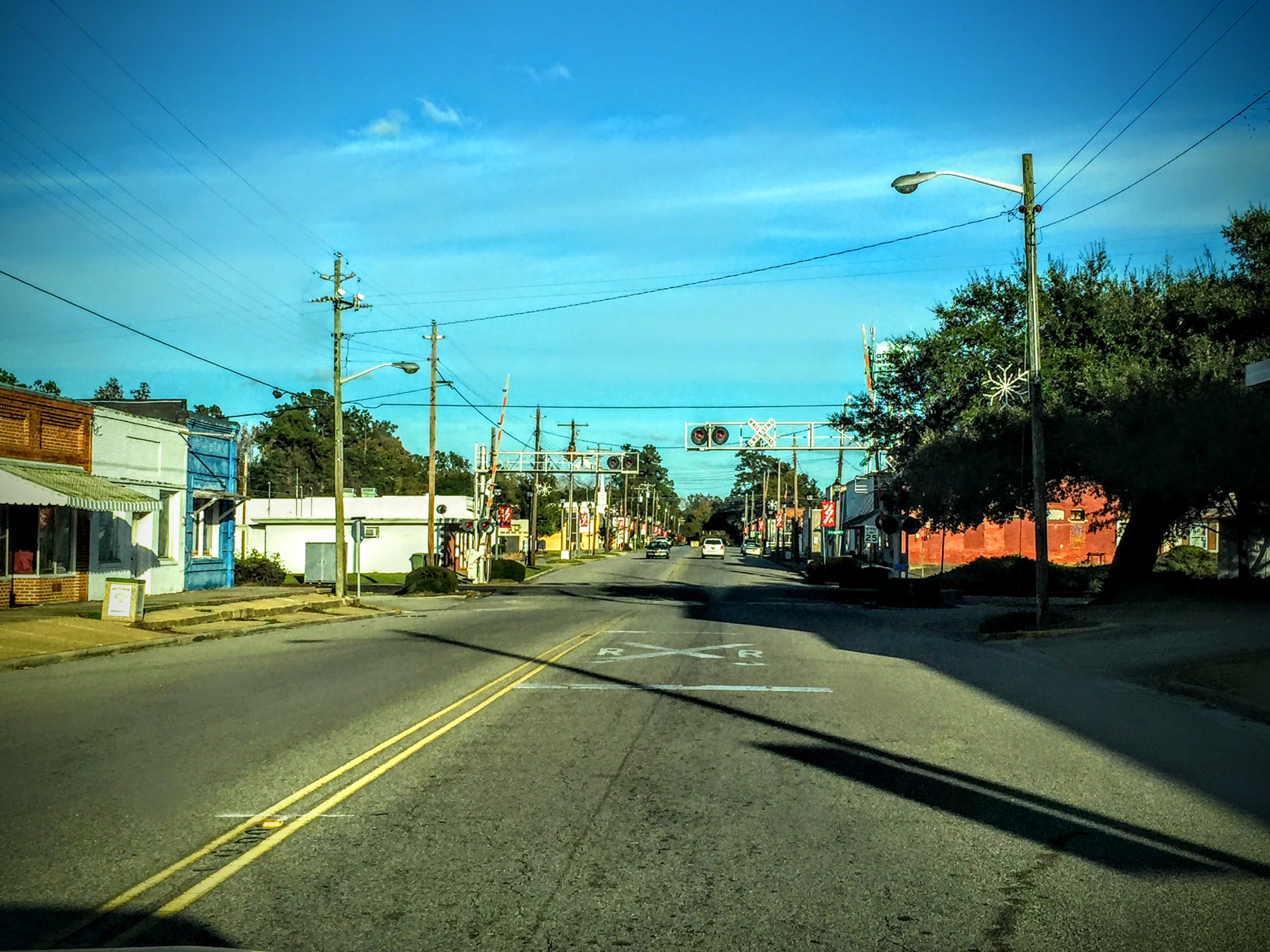
Broadway St. Looking East, 2015

Johnsonville is located in southeastern Florence County. The center of town is 1.5 miles (2.4 km) south of the crossing of the Lynches River by South Carolina Highways 41 and 51. The combined highways lead north 4 miles (6 km) to U.S. Route 378 at Kingsburg and south 5 miles (8 km) to Hemingway.

South Carolina Highway 341 passes through the center of town as Broadway Street, leading west 20 miles (32 km) to Lake City. Florence, the county seat, is 35 miles (56 km) to the northwest, while Myrtle Beach is 45 miles (72 km) to the east.

According to the United States Census Bureau, the city has a total area of 2.1 square miles (5.4 km^{2}), of which 0.03 square miles (0.07 km^{2}), or 1.36%, is water.

The city of Johnsonville is located only a few miles from The Johnsonville Impact Crater, a circular geophysical feature that represents an ancient impact crater, situated at the junction of Lynches River and the Pee Dee River in South Carolina. Snows Island, at that point, is believed to be the upthrust of the center after the impact. This eight-mile-wide crater is not well defined at the surface and was discovered by magnetic anomalies and supported by the study of well drilling cores. Supposed impact breccia was found in these cores.

== Demographics ==
Historical population
Census	Pop.	Note	%±
1920	271		—
1930	325		19.9%
1940	464		42.8%
1950	616		32.8%
1960	882		43.2%
1970	1,267		43.7%
1980	1,421		12.2%
1990	1,415		−0.4%
2000	1,418		0.2%
2010	1,480		4.4%
2020	1,378		−6.9%
U.S. Decennial Census

=== 2020 census ===
As of the 2020 census, Johnsonville had a population of 1,378 and a median age of 42.1 years. 22.7% of residents were under the age of 18 and 19.4% of residents were 65 years of age or older. For every 100 females there were 90.6 males, and for every 100 females age 18 and over there were 88.2 males age 18 and over.

There were 566 households in Johnsonville, of which 34.3% had children under the age of 18 living in them. Of all households, 40.5% were married-couple households, 16.3% were households with a male householder and no spouse or partner present, and 35.7% were households with a female householder and no spouse or partner present. About 27.1% of all households were made up of individuals and 14.5% had someone living alone who was 65 years of age or older.

There were 628 housing units, of which 9.9% were vacant. The homeowner vacancy rate was 3.1% and the rental vacancy rate was 3.6%.

0.0% of residents lived in urban areas, while 100.0% lived in rural areas.

Racial composition as of the 2020 census
Race	Number	Percent
White	938	68.1%
Black or African American	349	25.3%
American Indian and Alaska Native	6	0.4%
Asian	16	1.2%
Native Hawaiian and Other Pacific Islander	0	0.0%
Some other race	17	1.2%
Two or more races	52	3.8%
Hispanic or Latino (of any race)	36	2.6%

=== 2000 census ===
As of the 2000 census, there were 1,418 people, 532 households, and 413 families residing in the city. The population density was 897.6 inhabitants per square mile (346.6/km^{2}). There were 602 housing units at an average density of 381.1 per square mile (147.1/km^{2}). The racial makeup of the city was 75.74% White, 22.78% Black, 0.21% Native American, 0.14% Asian, 0.56% from other races, and 0.56% from two or more races. Hispanic or Latino of any race were 1.06% of the population.

There were 532 households, out of which 35.7% had children under the age of 18 living with them, 52.8% were married couples living together, 18.6% had a female householder with no husband present, and 22.2% were non-families. 19.9% of all households were made up of individuals, and 9.2% had someone living alone who was 65 years of age or older. The average household size was 2.65 and the average family size was 3.03.

In the city, the population was spread out, with 26.4% under the age of 18, 8.9% from 18 to 24, 26.5% from 25 to 44, 25.8% from 45 to 64, and 12.3% who were 65 years of age or older. The median age was 37 years. For every 100 females, there were 88.1 males. For every 100 females age 18 and over, there were 82.7 males.

The median income for a household in the city was $34,274, and the median income for a family was $38,690. Males had a median income of $30,109 versus $19,500 for females. The per capita income for the city was $15,539. About 13.3% of families and 16.6% of the population were below the poverty line, including 21.5% of those under age 18 and 18.1% of those age 65 or over.

== Education ==
Johnsonville's graded schools are located in Florence County School District 5, a small, rural district located in the lower part of Florence County encompassing the city of Johnsonville and the surrounding areas. The district covers approximately 88 square miles that includes a total population of 6,440 residents, which includes the 1,480 residents within the town limits.

Johnsonville has a public library, a branch of the Florence County Library System.

== Arts and culture ==
The city hosts the annual Johnsonville Heritage Festival, which began in 2011 to celebrate the area's ties to the American Revolution. Prior to the 2000s, a Founders Day festival was held on Broadway Street. The 2022 Heritage Festival saw the event move from Odell Venters Landing back to Johnsonville's downtown Broadway Street location.

== City Government ==
Johnsonville has a mayor and council government. The City Council consists of a six-member elected body of five council members and the Mayor. All seats are on a four-year cycle and are at-large seats as the city is not divided into districts. City Council is responsible for forming policy and governing the city. The City Administrator is appointed by City Council. The administrator directs the daily operations of city government, supervises city employees and provides policy advice. The current council makeup consists of:

- Johnny Hanna - Mayor (elected 2019)
- Jamie Altman - Mayor Pro Tempore (elected 2021)
- Gary Arthurs - Council (elected 2019)
- Frankie Poston - Council (elected 2019)
- M. Doolittle Stone - Council (elected 2021)
- Dipen Khambhaita - Council (elected 2021)
- Kenneth D. Ard - Council (elected 2023)

Joseph Stevens "Steve" Dukes, former mayor, was the city's longest serving public figure. He was first elected to City Council in 1981. He was elected mayor in 2004 and served until 2019.
Edward "Dwight" Carraway, Jr. (1956-2019), a resident of Johnsonville, was South Carolina's youngest person elected to public office in June 1976 (age 20).

== Notable person ==
- Jim Maxwell, retired NFL linebacker
