= Cades, South Carolina =

- Unincorporated community
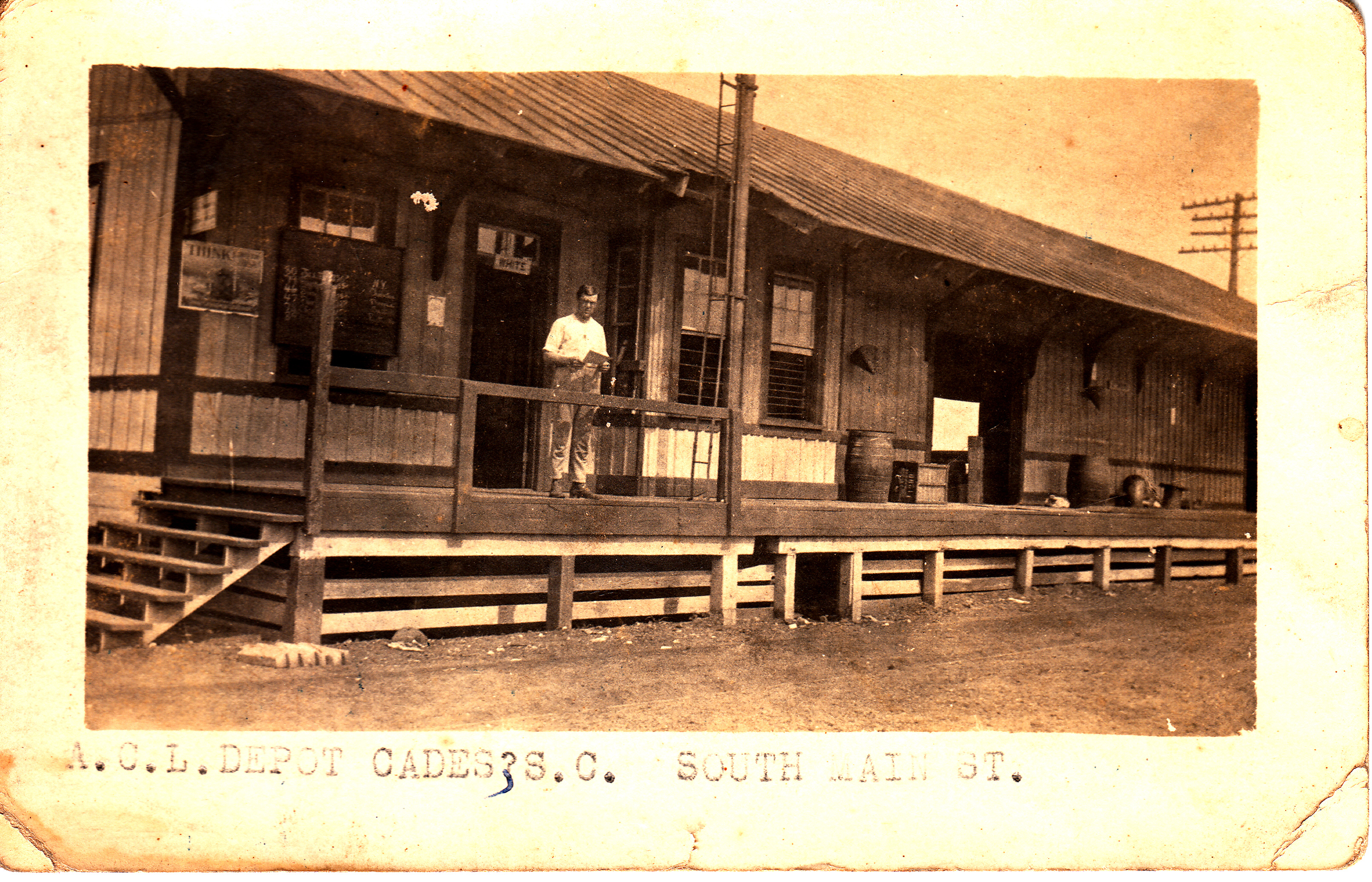
- Cades Depot, Cades, SC, station agent D. J. Kirton, ~1930s

- Location within South Carolina Location within the United States
- Coordinates: 33°47′12″N 79°46′57″W
- Country: United States
- State: South Carolina
- County: Williamsburg, Georgetown
- Elevation: 33 ft (10 m)
- Time zone: UTC-5 (Eastern (EST))
  - Summer (DST): UTC-4 (EDT)
- ZIP code: 29518
- Area codes: 843, 854
- GNIS feature ID: 1247081

Cades is an unincorporated community in northern Williamsburg County, South Carolina, United States. It is the birthplace of former Governor Robert Evander McNair.

Originally named Camp Ridge, it changed its name to Cades when the post office was established in 1887. The community was named after C. W. Cades, an early postmaster, or possibly after early postmaster Vernal Glenn Arnette's (1885-1974) grandfather, Cade Arnette (1823-1864).

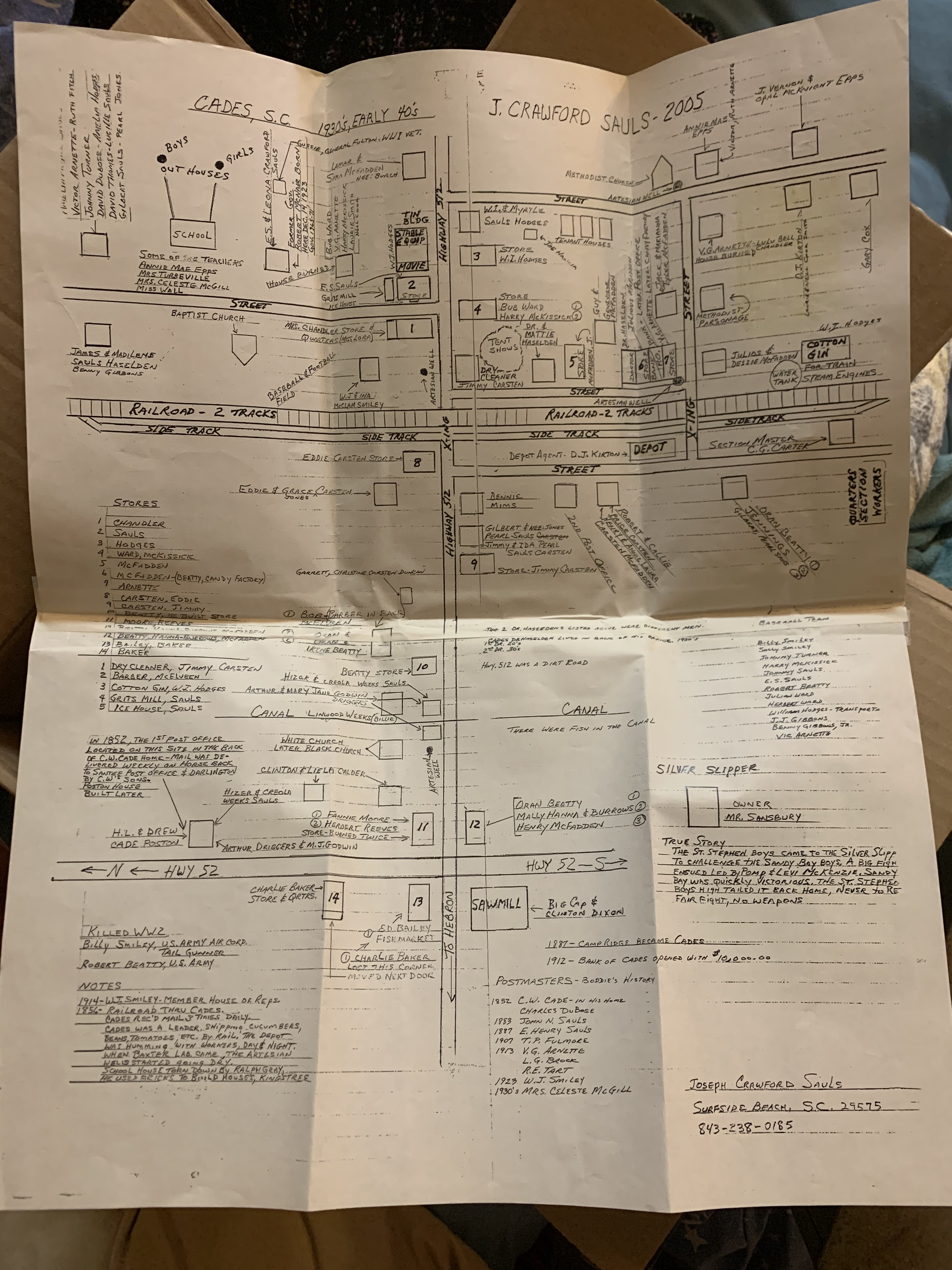
Cades, SC dwellings 1930s-1940s
