= Lynches River =

Coordinates: 34.8206931°N 80.5535716°W

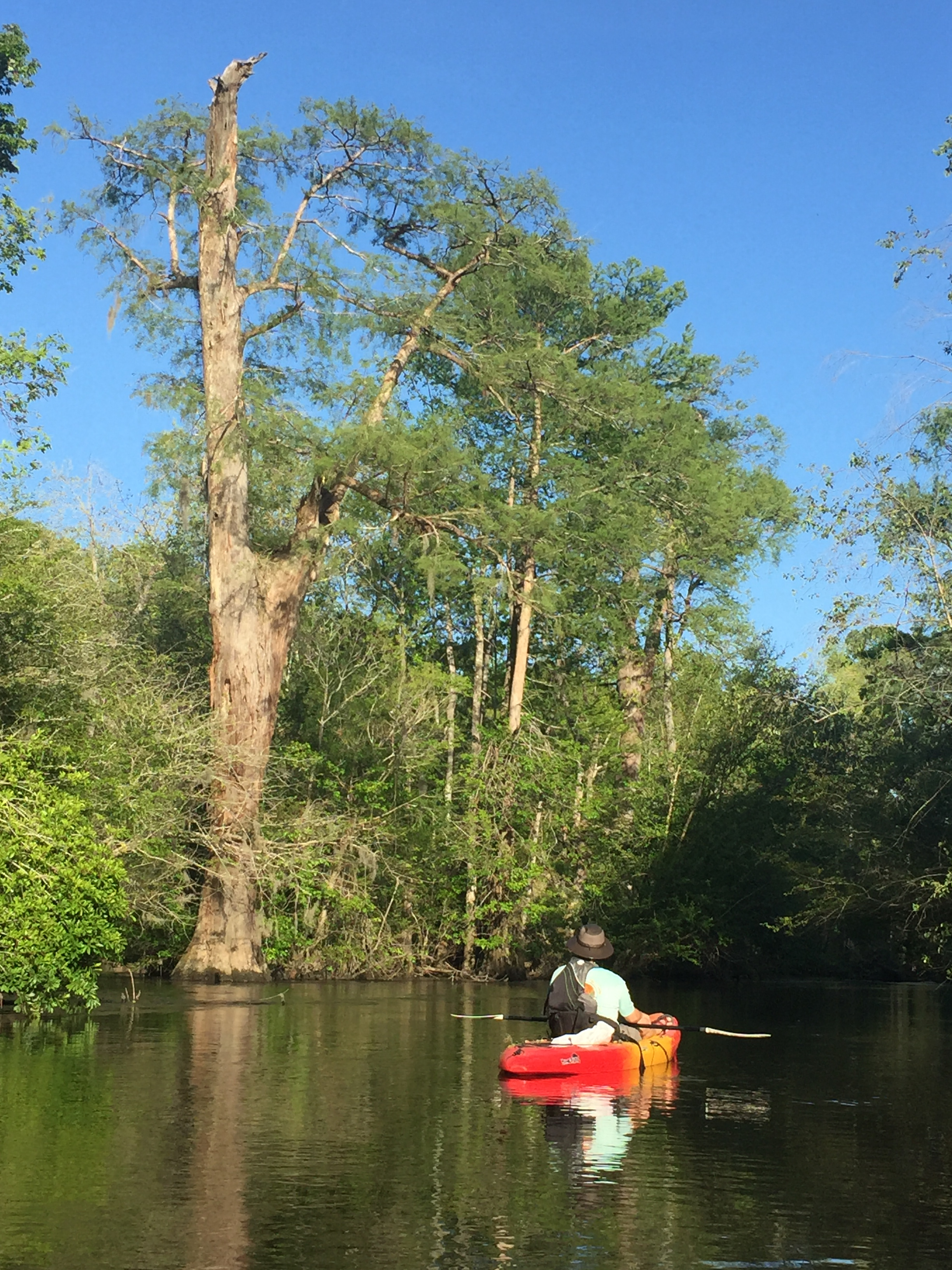
- Lynches River in the coastal plain near Scranton, South Carolina

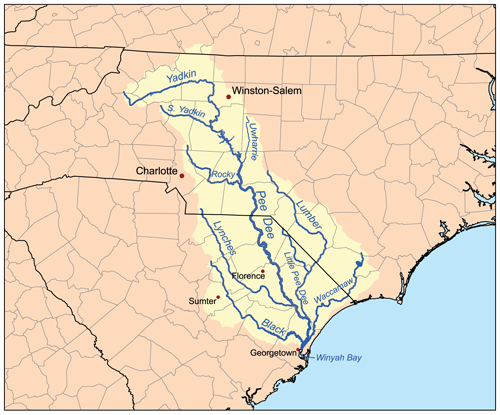
- Pee Dee River watershed.
- Etymology: Thomas Lynch

Location
- Country: United States
- State: North Carolina, South Carolina

Physical characteristics
- Source: Near Waxhaw, NC
  - location: North Carolina
  - elevation: 700 ft (210 m)
- Mouth: Pee Dee River
  - location: South Carolina
- Length: 140 mi (230 km)

Lynches River, named for Thomas Lynch, Jr., signer of the Declaration of Independence, rises in North Carolina near Waxhaw, North Carolina, at about 700 feet (210 m) elevation, flowing only a short distance to the South Carolina border, and thence to join the Pee Dee River near Johnsonville. It is about 140 mi (230 km) long and the drainage area is 1,030 square miles (2,700 km^{2}).

Several sections of the river have been designated by the state of South Carolina as a wild and scenic river, with the upper portions from Bishopville to the eastern boundary of Lynches River County Park receiving designation in 1994, and the lower 57-mile section designated in 2008. The river is a favorite for canoeing, but Hurricane Hugo in 1989 felled many trees, blocking the flow at places, making navigation difficult at low water and dangerous at high water. River enthusiasts have been gradually cleaning up the storm debris. The river is also a popular fishing spot, with sunfish, redbreast, catfish and largemouth bass.

== Geography ==
=== Upper Basin ===
The upper reaches of the river are in the Piedmont, an area of worn-down mountains, consisting mostly of metamorphic rocks, overlain by rocky clay soils. Much of the Piedmont is forested with some agricultural land, especially around Pageland, site of an annual watermelon festival.

This section of the river was an important gold- and minor iron-mining area in the 19th century, with the first known gold being mined by placer in Lynches River and its tributaries near Pageland and Jefferson starting about 1828. Before the Civil War, 58 gold mines operated in South Carolina. All commercial mining ceased in 1942 when the federal government's War Labor Board and PL-208 outlawed gold mining across the country. With the value of gold locked at $35 per ounce, and federal law prohibiting private citizens from holding gold between the 1930s and 1980s, nearly all gold mines in the United States became impractical and unprofitable to operate.

When the price of gold was released by the federal government, prices rose, and feasibility studies were begun on some of the old sites. The Brewer gold mine, between Jefferson and Lynches River, was deemed to have sufficient reserves to open it with modern machinery and technology. Between 1987 and 1991, the mine produced 118,000 troy ounces (3,700 kg) of gold, by crushing the ore and leaching it with a cyanide solution to dissolve the gold. In 1990, an accidental spill released cyanide into Lynches River and 11,000 fish died. The mine was closed for a few months for cleanup and repair.

=== Middle Basin ===
The river drops off the Piedmont between Bethune and McBee, cutting through the Sandhills region, an old ocean shoreline with hills that are thought to be former beach dunes, now used for peach orchards and pine plantations. Near the river is the Carolina Sandhills National Wildlife Refuge and the Sandhills State Forest, both in Chesterfield County.

At Bethune, South Carolina, the only bridge in the world that crosses the same river three times and the river does not fork can be found. The Lynches River forms a large "S" at the place where US Highway 1 crosses the river one mile north of Bethune.

=== Lower Basin ===
Below this, the river valley widens and it begins to meander more, as it finishes its course through the coastal plain. As it passes Bishopville, South Carolina and Lynchburg, South Carolina, it flows through a traditional cotton-farming belt. Bishopville is the site of the South Carolina Cotton Museum.

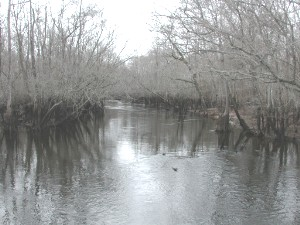
Lynches River in winter, Johnsonville, South Carolina

Lee State Park, 4 miles southeast of Bishopville, is a gateway to the Lynches River. Although river access is limited at the park, several boat ramps are located nearby. Fishing may be enjoyed from the park's riverbanks. Children under 14 may fish in the artesian lake which has been stocked with catfish. From a boardwalk out into the Lynches River floodplain, visitors can enjoy the views. At Coward, South Carolina, Florence County owns Lynches River County Park, which features nature trails, an elevated canopy walk, a splash pad, geocaching, canoeing, and standards-based environmental education programs.

As the floodplain widens, the riversides become forested with tupelo, bald cypress, red maple, and other water-loving vegetation. The uplands from Effingham to Johnsonville, South Carolina are also rich agricultural areas. Tobacco is the primary money crop for farmers, but cotton, corn, wheat, hay, and vegetables are also grown. Effingham is the site of McCall Farms, South Carolina's only canning factory. At Johnsonville, the stream passes what was the largest factory along its length, that of Wellman Industries, a fiber-processing and recycling plant. Just below Johnsonville, Lynches River empties into the (Great) Pee Dee River.

=== Ecology ===
Part of Lynches River has been designated by the U.S. Fish and Wildlife Service as critical habitat for the federally endangered Carolina heelsplitter, Lasmigona decorata, a freshwater mussel. The Carolina heelsplitter is a medium-sized freshwater mussel, reaching almost 4.5 inches (110 mm) in length, with a greenish-brown to dark brown shell. It is threatened by pollution and silting, and only six small populations still are known to exist.

Also in the Lynches River is a gastropod called the ridged lioplax, Lioplax subcarinata. South Carolina has designated it a species of concern. It has only been found in the Lynches and Waccamaw Rivers.
