= Manning, South Carolina =

- City
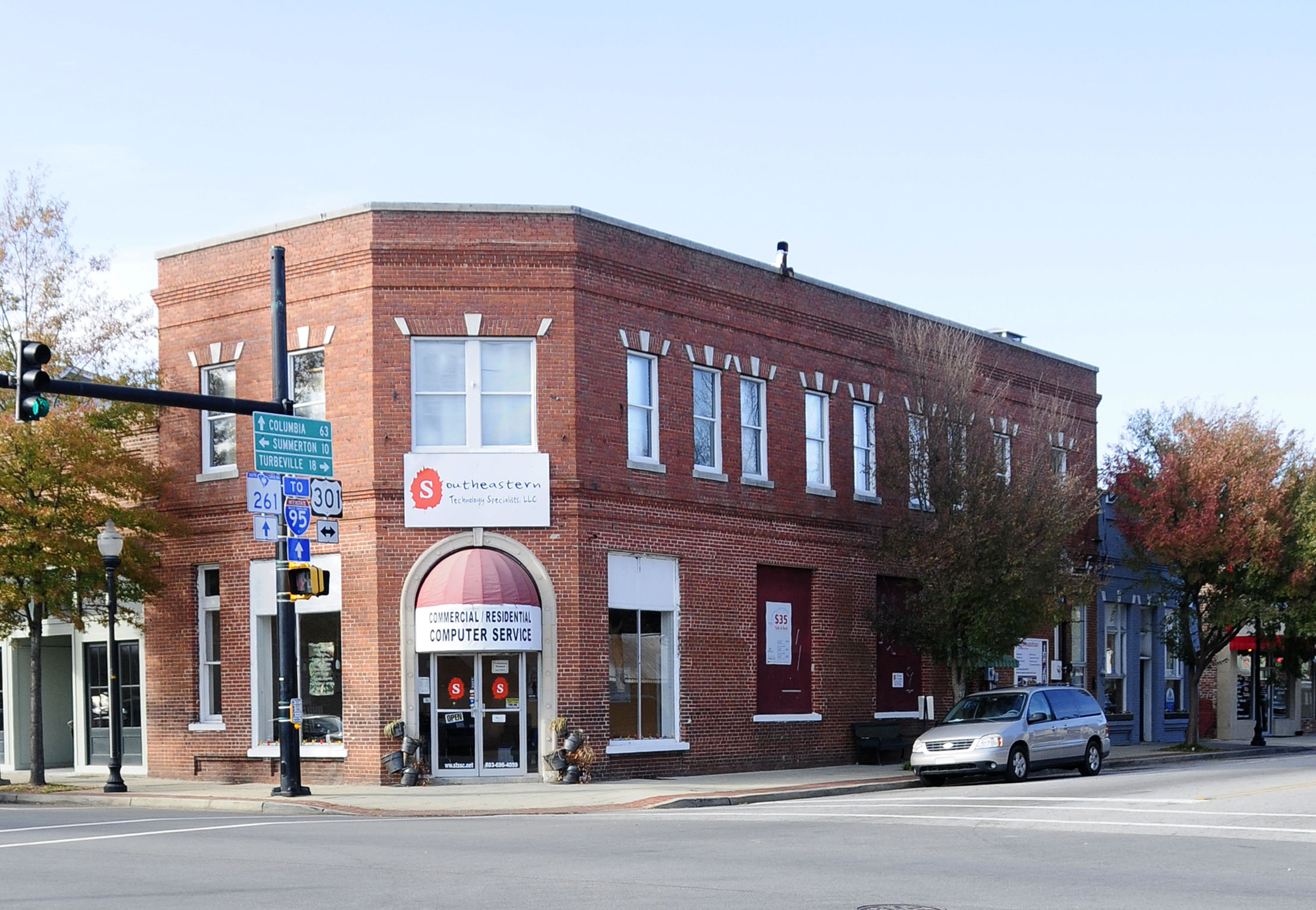
- The NRHP-listed Commercial Historic District in Manning.

- Seal
- Motto(s): "Matchless For Beauty & Hospitality"
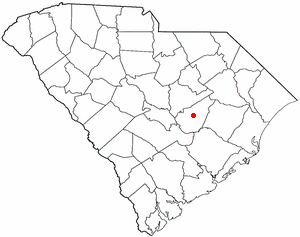
- Location in Clarendon County, South Carolina
- Coordinates: 33°41′36″N 80°13′00″W
- Country: United States
- State: South Carolina
- County: Clarendon

Government
  - Type: Mayor–council

Area
  - Total: 2.93 sq mi (7.60 km^{2})
  - Land: 2.93 sq mi (7.60 km^{2})
  - Water: 0 sq mi (0.00 km^{2})
- Elevation: 128 ft (39 m)

Population (2020)
  - Total: 3,878
  - Density: 1,321.3/sq mi (510.17/km^{2})
- Time zone: UTC-5 (EST)
  - Summer (DST): UTC-4 (EDT)
- ZIP code: 29102
- Area codes: 803, 839
- FIPS code: 45-44350
- GNIS feature ID: 2405009
- Website: www.cityofmanning.org

Manning is a city in and the county seat of Clarendon County, South Carolina, United States. As of the 2020 census, Manning had a population of 3,878. It was named after former South Carolina governor John Laurence Manning.

== History ==
In 1855, the South Carolina Legislature appointed a group of commissioners to select and purchase a tract of land for "the Village of Manning" in the newly formed Clarendon County. According to the Watchmen, a local newspaper of the time, "the Legislature (had) granted a bill of divorce between Clarendon and Claremont (Sumter)."

Thirteen men were named as commissioners to select and acquire from 6 to 60 acres (2.4 to 24.3 ha) on which to lay out the new courthouse village: R. C. Baker, L. F. Rhame, J. C. Brock, W. W. Owens, Joseph Sprott, J. C. Burgess, M. T. Brogdon, J. J. Nelson, Samuel A. Burgess, J. J. McFadden, Jesse Hill, R. R. Haynsworth, and P. S. Worsham. Five other commissioners, R. I. Manning, L. F. Rhame, J. B. Brogdon, J. J. Conyers, and William A. Burgess, were later named when it came time to erect the courthouse and jail from a state appropriation of $18,000, plus whatever funds might be realized from the sale of lots. The site for the village was presented to the state by Captain Joseph Copley Burgess, and the Plat of Manning was prepared and filed in Sumter County Courthouse. (Captain Burgess had also donated land for the courthouse and jail in Manning.) On the second Monday of the following October, the new district officers were elected, and Clarendon began to operate independently from Sumter District with Manning as its county seat.

The city was named for John Lawrence Manning, who was elected to both chambers in the General Assembly. He was later chosen by the Assembly to serve as Governor of South Carolina from 1852 to 1854. George Allen Huggins was the first intendant (mayor) of Manning.

Manning's Post Office was established in 1856, and Thomas S. Coogler was appointed as the first Postmaster. Manning's first library, the Hannah Levi Memorial Library, was completed in 1910. It was funded by the children of Moses and Hannah Levi, and by the sale of the Moses Levi Institute. They named it in honor of their mother. It eventually became known as the Manning Library and was the only public library in the county. It became a county library in 1976 and continued to operate until the opening of the Harvin Clarendon County Library in 1984. The building now houses the Clarendon County Archives and History Center.

Manning was severely damaged several times over its history. A large portion of the original town, including the courthouse, was destroyed in the Civil War in 1865 during what is known as "Potter's Raid". This raid by Union troops took place only a few days before Gen. Robert E. Lee's surrender at Appomattox. Manning was later struck by a downtown fire in 1895 and damaged by a tornado in 1915.

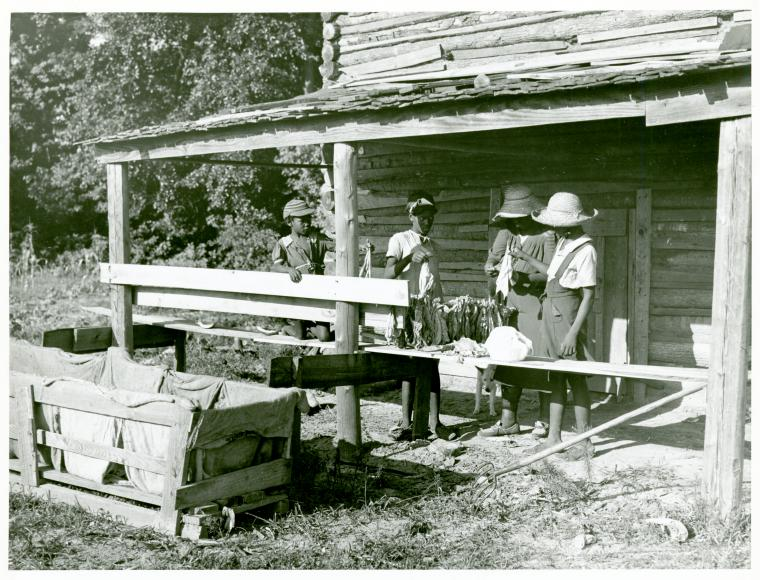
Pauline Clyburn, rehabilitation client, and her children stringing tobacco, photographed by Marion Post Wolcott (June 1939)

Railroads, abundant timber and diverse agriculture allowed Manning to flourish during the late 19th century and into the 20th century. In 1933, Highway 4 was changed to U.S. Route 301 and thanks in part to the efforts of Manning resident W. P. Legg, Manning and Clarendon County became a preferred route of the Washington to Florida motorist. Manning is along the I-95 corridor and attracts retirees looking for various recreational activities and mild climates.

As early as 1960 Manning was one of many towns across the South for the staging of peaceful Civil Rights demonstrations and sit-ins. Unlike in some other areas, the demonstrations in Manning occurred without significant incident, but helped belie the local media's message that black Carolinians accepted the status quo. Manning and the surrounding region was still adjusting to the decisions handed down in the Briggs v. Elliott and Brown v. Board of Education rulings against racial segregation in schools.

In 1969 Pansy Ridgeway became the first woman to be elected mayor of Manning. She served as mayor of Manning from 1970 to 1996 and was the third woman elected mayor in South Carolina and the first woman elected president of the South Carolina Municipal Association.

On April 5, 2022, an EF2 tornado caused considerable damage on the western and northwestern sides of towns. Many homes, businesses, garages, trees, power poles and lines, and vehicles were damaged, some heavily.

== Government ==
The city government consists of a mayor and a city council. The mayor is elected at-large, and the council consists of six members who are elected from each of six districts.

Manning is represented in the South Carolina Senate by Kevin L. Johnson. It is part of South Carolina's 6th congressional district which since January 1993 has been represented by Jim Clyburn.

== Media ==
Manning is home to The Manning Times newspaper. It is published weekly and is updated online daily.

== Education ==
The school district is Clarendon School District 2.

Manning maintained school systems, one for black students and one for whites until court-ordered integration caused Manning Training School (for blacks) to merge with all white Manning High School in 1970. At that time, Manning Training School became Manning Middle School, then later Manning Elementary. In response, a private school, Laurence Manning Academy was created. Manning is also the location of the F.E. DuBose Campus of Central Carolina Technical College.

Manning has a lending library, the Clarendon County Public Library.

== Geography ==
Manning is located near the center of Clarendon County. It is just to the east of Interstate 95 and at the intersection of U.S. 301 and U.S. 521. Via I-95 it is 48 miles (77 km) northeast to Florence and 35 miles (56 km) southwest to Interstate 26. Interchanges for Manning along I-95 include US 301 (exit 115), South Carolina Highway 261 (exit 119) and US 521 (exit 122). US 301 leads northeast 18 miles (29 km) to Turbeville and southwest 10 miles (16 km) to Summerton, while US 521 leads northwest 19 miles (31 km) to Sumter and southeast 15 miles (24 km) to Greeleyville.

According to the United States Census Bureau, Manning has a total area of 2.76 square miles (7.15 km^{2}), all land. It is just south of the Pocotaligo River, a tributary of the Black River.

=== Climate ===
Manning has a humid subtropical climate (Köppen: Cfa) with long, hot summers and short, mild winters.

Climate data for Manning, South Carolina (normals 1991–2020, extremes 1948–present)
Month	Jan	Feb	Mar	Apr	May	Jun	Jul	Aug	Sep	Oct	Nov	Dec	Year
Record high °F (°C)	88 (31)	84 (29)	92 (33)	98 (37)	105 (41)	104 (40)	108 (42)	109 (43)	101 (38)	99 (37)	89 (32)	83 (28)	109 (43)
Mean maximum °F (°C)	74.8 (23.8)	77.4 (25.2)	83.9 (28.8)	88.4 (31.3)	93.8 (34.3)	97.6 (36.4)	98.5 (36.9)	98.0 (36.7)	93.9 (34.4)	87.5 (30.8)	81.7 (27.6)	75.8 (24.3)	100.5 (38.1)
Mean daily maximum °F (°C)	55.2 (12.9)	58.8 (14.9)	66.6 (19.2)	75.1 (23.9)	82.0 (27.8)	87.6 (30.9)	90.5 (32.5)	89.0 (31.7)	83.4 (28.6)	74.5 (23.6)	65.2 (18.4)	58.0 (14.4)	73.8 (23.2)
Daily mean °F (°C)	45.2 (7.3)	48.0 (8.9)	54.7 (12.6)	62.8 (17.1)	70.5 (21.4)	77.5 (25.3)	80.6 (27.0)	79.4 (26.3)	73.9 (23.3)	63.7 (17.6)	53.9 (12.2)	47.5 (8.6)	63.1 (17.3)
Mean daily minimum °F (°C)	35.2 (1.8)	37.1 (2.8)	42.8 (6.0)	50.5 (10.3)	59.1 (15.1)	67.4 (19.7)	70.8 (21.6)	69.8 (21.0)	64.4 (18.0)	52.9 (11.6)	42.7 (5.9)	37.0 (2.8)	52.5 (11.4)
Mean minimum °F (°C)	18.4 (−7.6)	22.5 (−5.3)	25.9 (−3.4)	34.3 (1.3)	44.7 (7.1)	57.6 (14.2)	63.4 (17.4)	61.5 (16.4)	52.1 (11.2)	37.3 (2.9)	26.8 (−2.9)	22.5 (−5.3)	16.3 (−8.7)
Record low °F (°C)	0 (−18)	12 (−11)	7 (−14)	22 (−6)	34 (1)	39 (4)	48 (9)	49 (9)	34 (1)	22 (−6)	16 (−9)	7 (−14)	0 (−18)
Average precipitation inches (mm)	3.97 (101)	4.54 (115)	4.03 (102)	3.79 (96)	4.31 (109)	6.02 (153)	6.22 (158)	5.97 (152)	5.36 (136)	3.78 (96)	3.56 (90)	4.19 (106)	55.74 (1,414)
Average snowfall inches (cm)	0.4 (1.0)	0.1 (0.25)	0.0 (0.0)	0.0 (0.0)	0.0 (0.0)	0.0 (0.0)	0.0 (0.0)	0.0 (0.0)	0.0 (0.0)	0.0 (0.0)	0.0 (0.0)	0.0 (0.0)	0.5 (1.25)
Average precipitation days (≥ 0.01 in)	9.7	9.3	7.9	7.9	8.3	11.3	10.3	10.9	9.1	7.5	7.3	9.3	108.8
Average snowy days (≥ 0.1 in)	0.2	0.1	0.0	0.0	0.0	0.0	0.0	0.0	0.0	0.0	0.0	0.0	0.3
Source: NOAA

== Demographics ==
Historical population
Census	Pop.	Note	%±
1890	1,069		—
1900	1,430		33.8%
1910	1,854		29.7%
1920	2,022		9.1%
1930	1,884		−6.8%
1940	2,381		26.4%
1950	2,775		16.5%
1960	3,917		41.2%
1970	4,025		2.8%
1980	4,746		17.9%
1990	4,428		−6.7%
2000	4,025		−9.1%
2010	4,108		2.1%
2020	3,878		−5.6%
U.S. Decennial Census

=== 2020 census ===
As of the 2020 census, there were 3,878 people, 1,604 households, and 1,036 families residing in Manning; the median age was 39.7 years, 24.5% of residents were under the age of 18, and 21.0% were 65 years of age or older. For every 100 females there were 80.3 males, and for every 100 females age 18 and over there were 74.4 males age 18 and over.

Of those households, 32.5% had children under the age of 18 living in them, 27.9% were married-couple households, 17.8% were households with a male householder and no spouse or partner present, and 50.1% were households with a female householder and no spouse or partner present; about 35.1% of all households were made up of individuals and 17.1% had someone living alone who was 65 years of age or older.

There were 1,843 housing units, of which 13.0% were vacant; the homeowner vacancy rate was 3.1% and the rental vacancy rate was 6.7%.

99.7% of residents lived in urban areas, while 0.3% lived in rural areas.

Racial composition as of the 2020 census
Race	Number	Percent
White	1,143	29.5%
Black or African American	2,501	64.5%
American Indian and Alaska Native	16	0.4%
Asian	70	1.8%
Native Hawaiian and Other Pacific Islander	0	0.0%
Some other race	23	0.6%
Two or more races	125	3.2%
Hispanic or Latino (of any race)	85	2.2%

=== 2000 census ===
As of the census of 2000, there were 4,025 people, 1,550 households, and 1,063 families residing in the city. The population density was 1,671.1 inhabitants per square mile (645.2/km^{2}). There were 1,727 housing units at an average density of 717.0 per square mile (276.8/km^{2}). The racial makeup of the city was 62.36% African American, 35.80% White, 0.62% Asian, 0.25% Native American, 0.07% Pacific Islander, 0.40% from other races, and 0.50% from two or more races. Hispanic or Latino of any race were 1.04% of the population.

There were 1,550 households, out of which 31.9% had children under the age of 18 living with them, 35.3% were married couples living together, 29.2% had a female householder with no husband present, and 31.4% were non-families. 29.4% of all households were made up of individuals, and 14.5% had someone living alone who was 65 years of age or older. The average household size was 2.52 and the average family size was 3.10.

In the city, the population was spread out, with 27.8% under the age of 18, 9.2% from 18 to 24, 24.7% from 25 to 44, 21.8% from 45 to 64, and 16.4% who were 65 years of age or older. The median age was 36 years. For every 100 females, there were 80.4 males. For every 100 females age 18 and over, there were 72.4 males.

The median income for a household in the city was $22,483, and the median income for a family was $26,269. Males had a median income of $26,135 versus $19,086 for females. The per capita income for the city was $11,502. About 23.8% of families and 30.1% of the population were below the poverty line, including 38.5% of those under age 18 and 20.3% of those age 65 or over.

== Notable people ==
- Fred Bennett, defensive back for the Cincinnati Bengals
- Joseph W. Coker, Member of the South Carolina House of Representatives
- David du Bose Gaillard, engineer of the central portion of the Panama Canal
- Marian McKnight, Miss America 1957.
- Glenn Murray, baseball outfielder with the Philadelphia Phillies
- Peggy Parish, originating author of the Amelia Bedelia series of children's books.
- Darren Robinson (rapper), member of The Fat Boys
- Brad Sigmon, American serial killer, lived in Manning from 1977 until the 1990s.
- Josephine Sprott, president, Woman's Christian Temperance Union of South Carolina
- Luther Vandross, American soul singer, lived part of his childhood in Manning.
- Alvin Greene, failed United States Senate congressional candidate who mysteriously won the Democratic nomination.
