= National Register of Historic Places listings in Florence County, South Carolina =

Location of Florence County in South Carolina

This is a list of the National Register of Historic Places listings in Florence County, South Carolina.

This is intended to be a complete list of the properties and districts on the National Register of Historic Places in Florence County, South Carolina, United States. The locations of National Register properties and districts for which the latitude and longitude coordinates are included below, may be seen in a map.

There are 29 properties and districts listed on the National Register in the county, including 1 National Historic Landmark. There are also two former listings.

This National Park Service list is complete through NPS recent listings posted August 21, 2026.

== Current listings ==
	Name on the Register	Image	Date listed	Location	City or town	Description
1	W.T. Askins House	W.T. Askins House	May 26, 1995 (#95000636)	178 S. Acline Ave. 33°52′11″N 79°45′22″W	Lake City	
2	Blooming Grove	Blooming Grove	June 1, 2005 (#05000517)	Eastern end of Rogers Court; 34°16′06″N 79°42′51″W	Florence	
3	Bonnie Shade	Bonnie Shade	November 14, 1978 (#78002506)	1439 Cherokee Rd. 34°11′07″N 79°47′40″W	Florence	
4	Browntown	Browntown	June 28, 1982 (#82003850)	South Carolina Highway 341; 33°47′59″N 79°37′49″W	Johnsonville	
5	Christ Church	Christ Church	November 14, 1978 (#78002507)	Northeast of Florence on South Carolina Highway 327; 34°14′32″N 79°11′35″W	Florence	
6	Claussen House	Claussen House	April 11, 2001 (#01000343)	5109 Old River Rd. 34°07′53″N 79°37′44″W	Florence	
7	P.D. Cockfield House	P.D. Cockfield House	January 13, 2022 (#100007306)	125 Valley St. 33°52′33″N 79°45′04″W	Lake City	
8	Ebony Guest House		January 14, 2021 (#100006018)	712-714 Wilson St. 34°12′26″N 79°45′39″W	Florence	
9	Florence Downtown Historic District	Florence Downtown Historic District	July 2, 2008 (#08000621)	Portions of W. Evans, N. Dargan St., and S. Dargan St. and 124-201 W. Evans St., 34°11′52″N 79°45′59″W	Florence	
10	Florence National Cemetery	Florence National Cemetery	January 5, 1998 (#97001207)	803 E. National Cemetery Rd. 34°11′05″N 79°45′16″W	Florence	
11	Florence Public Library	Florence Public Library	November 15, 2006 (#06001041)	319 S. Irby St. 34°11′31″N 79°46′06″W	Florence	
12	Green's Funeral Home and Ambulance Service		January 28, 2025 (#100011408)	433 Ward Street; 33°51′50″N 79°46′04″W	Lake City	
13	Gregg-Wallace Farm Tenant House	Gregg-Wallace Farm Tenant House	January 28, 2002 (#01001550)	310 Price Rd. 34°12′06″N 79°39′07″W	Mars Bluff	
14	Griffin Motor Company	Griffin Motor Company	October 2, 2018 (#100003001)	329 N Irby St. 34°12′05″N 79°46′07″W	Florence	
15	Philip C. Heiden House		September 10, 2021 (#100006885)	116 North Blanding St. 33°52′16″N 79°44′49″W	Lake City	
16	Hopewell Presbyterian Church and Hopewell Cemetery	Hopewell Presbyterian Church and Hopewell Cemetery	June 2, 2000 (#00000589)	5314 Old River Rd. 34°07′42″N 79°37′26″W	Florence	
17	Jamestown Historic District	Jamestown Historic District	October 25, 2018 (#01000610)	Approximately 1 mile north of U.S. Routes 76/301; 34°13′36″N 79°36′18″W	Florence	An historic African-American community site.
18	Lake City Downtown Historic District	Lake City Downtown Historic District	January 24, 2003 (#01001551)	Main St. and Acline Ave. 33°52′22″N 79°45′17″W	Lake City	
19	Mt. Zion Rosenwald School	Mt. Zion Rosenwald School	October 12, 2001 (#01001098)	5040 Liberty Chapel Rd. 34°10′45″N 79°38′35″W	Florence	
20	Poynor Junior High School	Poynor Junior High School	May 19, 1983 (#83002194)	301 S. Dargan St. 34°11′36″N 79°45′56″W	Florence	
21	Rankin-Harwell House	Rankin-Harwell House	October 9, 1974 (#74001855)	6 miles northeast of Florence off South Carolina Highway 305; 34°13′55″N 79°08′47″W	Florence	
22	Red Doe	Red Doe	October 29, 1982 (#82001521)	East of Florence on South Carolina Highway 327; 34°10′29″N 79°38′51″W	Florence	
23	Roseville Plantation	Roseville Plantation	September 25, 1997 (#97001158)	3636 Williston Rd. 34°16′37″N 79°42′04″W	Florence	
24	Slave Houses, Gregg Plantation	Slave Houses, Gregg Plantation	July 22, 1974 (#74001856)	Francis Marion College campus 34°11′28″N 79°09′06″W	Mars Bluff	
25	Smith-Cannon House	Smith-Cannon House	July 28, 1983 (#83002195)	106 W. Market St. 34°08′05″N 79°56′35″W	Timmonsville	
26	Snow's Island		March 14, 1973 (#73001708)	Along the Pee Dee River, east of Johnsonville; 33°49′39″N 79°20′38″W	Johnsonville	A National Historic Landmark
27	The Stockade	The Stockade	November 28, 1980 (#80003669)	Address Restricted	Florence	
28	U.S. Post Office	U.S. Post Office	December 21, 1977 (#77001221)	Irby and W. Evan Sts. 34°11′50″N 79°46′07″W	Florence	
29	Woodlawn		May 13, 2019 (#100003917)	10 Kings Rd. 34°13′36″N 79°44′03″W	Quinby	

== Former listings ==
	Name on the Register	Image	Date listed	Date removed	Location	City or town	Description
1	Dr. Benjamin Gregg House		December 8, 1978 (#78002508)	March 15, 2000	315 S. Coit St.	Florence	Burned
2	Young Farm	Young Farm	November 10, 1983 (#83003854)	August 1, 2025	West of Florence on U.S. Route 76; 34°09′28″N 79°52′15″W	Florence	Demolished in 2024

== See also ==
- List of National Historic Landmarks in South Carolina
- National Register of Historic Places listings in South Carolina
