= South Carolina Highway 403 =

State highway in South Carolina, United States

South Carolina Highway 403

Route information
- Maintained by SCDOT
- Length: 36.480 mi (58.709 km)
- Existed: 1940–present

Major junctions
- South end: SC 341 in Camp Branch
- US 301 in Kelley Crossroads; I-95 near Sardis; US 76 in Timmonsville; US 401 in Windhams Crossroads
- North end: US 15 / SC 34 in Lees Crossroads

Location
- Country: United States
- State: South Carolina
- Counties: Florence, Sumter, Darlington

Highway system
- South Carolina State Highway System; Interstate; US; State; Scenic
← SC 402	→ SC 410

South Carolina Highway 403 (SC 403) is a 36.480-mile (58.709 km) primary state highway in the U.S. state of South Carolina. It serves the town of Timmonsville and the surrounding rural area with the cities of Lake City and Hartsville.

== Route description ==
SC 403 is a two-lane rural highway that traverses for 36.1 miles (58.1 km) beginning north of Lake City, along SC 341. Going through a northeasterly direction to Hobbs Crossroads, it then goes north to Sardis. Connecting with Interstate 95 (I-95) north of Sardis, it continues north connecting with U.S. Route 76 (US 76) near and then through Timmonsville. At Windhams Crossroads, it connects with US 401, where it provides access to I-20. At Lees Crossroads, it reaches its northern terminus, an intersection with US 15/SC 34. The vast majority of the landscape along the route is farmland, with the exception in and around Timmonsville.

== History ==
SC 403 was established in 1933 as a renumbering of US 301 from US 76 in Timmonsville to US 15 at Lees Crossroads. The entire route was paved in 1939. Around 1942, SC 403 was extended south SC 407 in Sparrows Crossroads. In 1948, SC 403 was retracted back to its original routing, leaving behind Hill Road (S-21-38). Between 1968 and 1970, SC 403 was extended south to its current southern terminus with SC 341, replacing part of SC 53 and nearly all of SC 309. Between 2005 and 2012, US 15 was realigned its Lees Crossroads intersection, removing an intersection corner bypass, giving an odd overlap with SC 403 for 0.2 miles (0.32 km) to where the corner bypass originally reconnected.

=== South Carolina Highway 309 ===
South Carolina Highway 309
- Location: Hobbs Crossroads-Camp Branch, South Carolina
- Length: 11.9 mi (19.2 km)
- Existed: 1940–1970

South Carolina Highway 309 (SC 309) was an 11.9-mile (19.2 km) state highway that was established in 1940 as a new primary routing, from SC 341 in Hobbs Crossroads, southeast to U.S. Route 301 (US 301). By 1942, it was extended southeast to reconnect with SC 341. Between 1968 and 1970, SC 309 was decommissioned and renumbered as an extension of SC 403 with only its westernmost piece downgraded to secondary road (Lynches River Road; S-42-14).

== Major intersections ==
County	Location	mi	km	Destinations	Notes
Florence	Camp Branch	0.000	0.000	SC 341 (Olanta Highway) – Lake City, Olanta, Bishopville	Southern terminus
Florence	Byrds Crossroads	5.150	8.288	SC 541 (Old Number 4 Highway) – Olanta, Coward	To Lynches River County Park
Florence	Kelley Crossroads	8.020	12.907	US 301 (Florence Highway) – Olanta, Florence	
Sumter	Hobbs Crossroads	11.480	18.475	SC 53 south (Narrow Paved Road) to SC 341 – Olanta, Lynchburg, Sumter	Northern terminus of SC 53
Florence		15.778– 15.780	25.392– 25.395	I-95 – Florence, Savannah	I-95 exit 150
Florence		19.400	31.221	US 76 west – Sumter	Southern end of US 76 concurrency
Florence	Timmonsville	20.930	33.684	US 76 east (Smith Street) – Florence	Northern end of US 76 concurrency
Darlington		23.680	38.109	SC 340 north (Timmonsville Highway) – Darlington	Southern terminus of SC 340
Darlington	Windhams Crossroads	28.620	46.059	US 401 (Lamar Highway) to I-20 – Darlington, Lamar, Sumter	I-20 exit 131
Darlington	Lees Crossroads	36.480	58.709	US 15 / SC 34 (Lydia Highway) – Bishopville, Hartsville, Darlington	Northern terminus; roadway continues as US 15 northbound toward Hartsville
1.000 mi = 1.609 km; 1.000 km = 0.621 mi: Concurrency terminus
