= South Carolina Highway 541 =

State highway in South Carolina, United States

South Carolina Highway 541

Route information
- Maintained by SCDOT
- Length: 10.660 mi (17.156 km)

Major junctions
- West end: SC 341 near Olanta
- SC 403 near Olanta
- East end: US 52 in Coward

Location
- Country: United States
- State: South Carolina
- Counties: Florence

Highway system
- South Carolina State Highway System; Interstate; US; State; Scenic
← SC 527	→ SC 544

South Carolina Highway 541 (SC 541) is a 10.660-mile (17.156 km) state highway in the U.S. state of South Carolina. The highway connects Olanta with Coward.

== Route description ==
SC 541 begins at an intersection with SC 341 (East Hampton Street/Olanta Highway) just east of Olanta, within Florence County. It travels to the east-northeast and crosses over Camp Branch before intersecting SC 403 (North Bethel Road). The highway curves to the east-southeast. When it enters Coward, it curves to the northeast and meets its eastern terminus, an intersection with U.S. Route 52 (US 52).

== Major intersections ==
The entire route is in Florence County.

Location	mi	km	Destinations	Notes
	0.000	0.000	SC 341 (East Hampton Street / Olanta Highway) – Olanta, Lake City	Western terminus
	2.950	4.748	SC 403 (North Bethel Road) – Walhalla	
Coward	10.660	17.156	US 52 – Fair Play	
1.000 mi = 1.609 km; 1.000 km = 0.621 mi
