= Scranton, South Carolina =

- Town
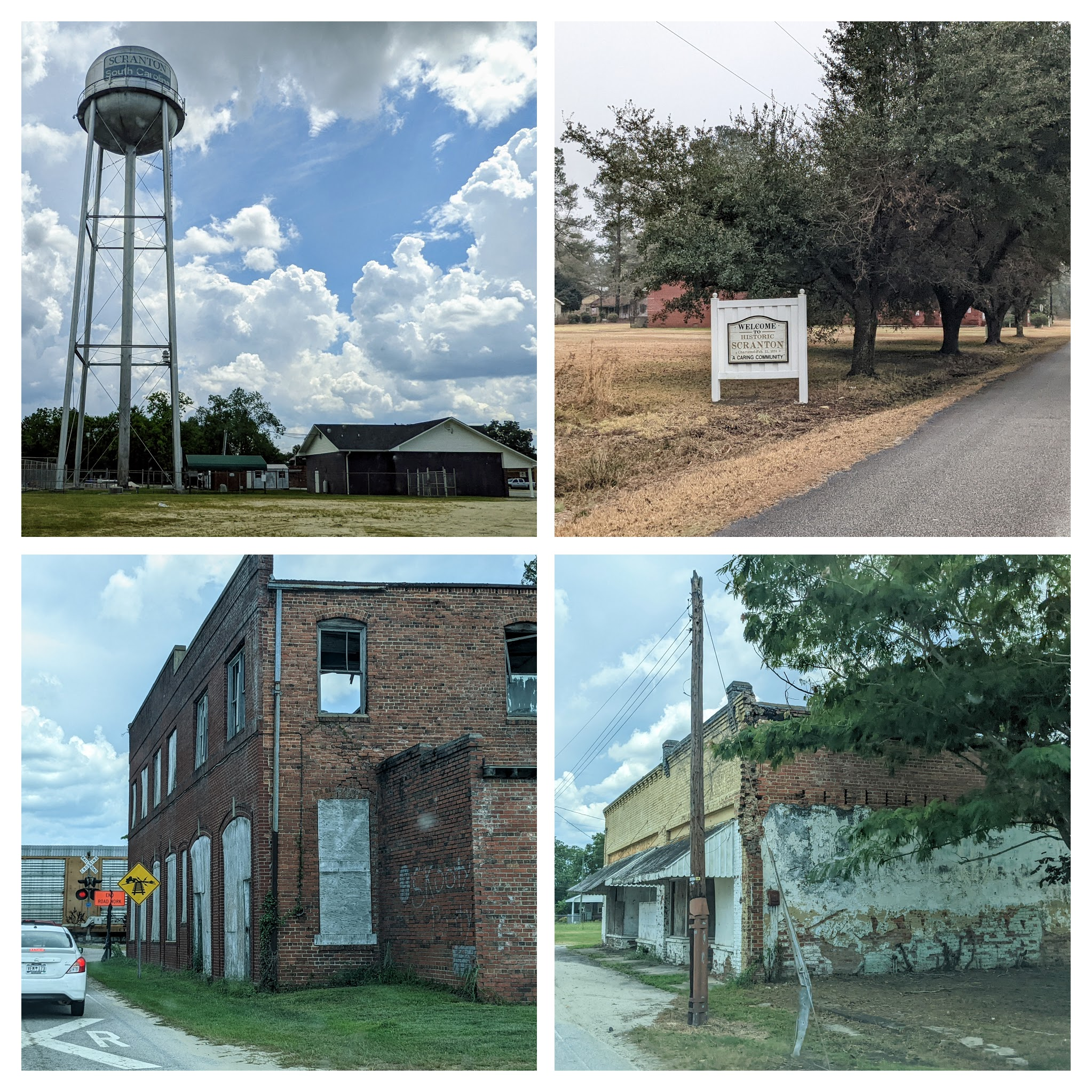
- Views of Scranton

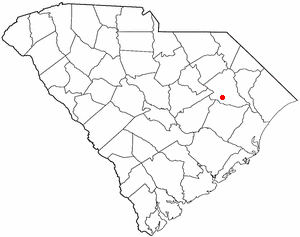
- Location of Scranton in South Carolina
- Coordinates: 33°55′02″N 79°44′50″W
- Country: United States
- State: South Carolina
- County: Florence

Area
  - Total: 0.79 sq mi (2.05 km^{2})
  - Land: 0.79 sq mi (2.05 km^{2})
  - Water: 0 sq mi (0.00 km^{2})
- Elevation: 95 ft (29 m)

Population (2020)
  - Total: 648
  - Density: 817.7/sq mi (315.73/km^{2})
- Time zone: UTC-5 (EST)
  - Summer (DST): UTC-4 (EDT)
- ZIP code: 29591
- Area codes: 843, 854
- FIPS code: 45-64600
- GNIS feature ID: 2407301
- Website: https://www.scrantonsc.org/

Scranton is a town in Florence County, South Carolina, United States. The population was 932 at the 2010 census. It is part of the Florence Metropolitan Statistical Area.

== Geography ==
Scranton is located in southern Florence County. U.S. Route 52 passes through the town, leading north 20 miles (32 km) to Florence, the county seat, and south 3 miles (5 km) to Lake City.

According to the United States Census Bureau, the town of Scranton has a total area of 0.85 square miles (2.2 km^{2}), all land.

== Demographics ==
Historical population
Census	Pop.	Note	%±
1880	124		—
1900	208		—
1910	308		48.1%
1920	294		−4.5%
1930	392		33.3%
1940	438		11.7%
1950	602		37.4%
1960	613		1.8%
1970	732		19.4%
1980	861		17.6%
1990	802		−6.9%
2000	942		17.5%
2010	932		−1.1%
2020	648		−30.5%
U.S. Decennial Census

=== 2020 census ===
Scranton town, South Carolina – Racial and ethnic composition Note: the US Census treats Hispanic/Latino as an ethnic category. This table excludes Latinos from the racial categories and assigns them to a separate category. Hispanics/Latinos may be of any race.
Race / Ethnicity (NH = Non-Hispanic)	Pop 2000	Pop 2010	Pop 2020	% 2000	% 2010	% 2020
White alone (NH)	393	364	277	41.72%	39.06%	42.75%
Black or African American alone (NH)	526	543	344	55.84%	58.26%	53.09%
Native American or Alaska Native alone (NH)	3	3	0	0.32%	0.32%	0.00%
Asian alone (NH)	0	1	1	0.00%	0.11%	0.15%
Native Hawaiian or Pacific Islander alone (NH)	0	0	0	0.00%	0.00%	0.00%
Other race alone (NH)	0	0	4	0.00%	0.00%	0.62%
Mixed race or Multiracial (NH)	9	5	14	0.96%	0.54%	2.16%
Hispanic or Latino (any race)	11	16	8	1.17%	1.72%	1.23%
Total	942	932	648	100.00%	100.00%	100.00%

=== 2000 census ===
As of the census of 2000, there were 942 people, 314 households, and 226 families residing in the town. The population density was 1,132.0 inhabitants per square mile (437.1/km^{2}). There were 347 housing units at an average density of 417.0 per square mile (161.0/km^{2}). The racial makeup of the town was 42.36% White, 56.05% African American, 0.32% Native American, 0.32% from other races, and 0.96% from two or more races. Hispanic or Latino of any race were 1.17% of the population.

There were 314 households, out of which 35.4% had children under the age of 18 living with them, 42.7% were married couples living together, 25.2% had a female householder with no husband present, and 28.0% were non-families. 24.5% of all households were made up of individuals, and 8.3% had someone living alone who was 65 years of age or older. The average household size was 2.53 and the average family size was 2.97.

In the town, the population was spread out, with 23.2% under the age of 18, 7.6% from 18 to 24, 25.5% from 25 to 44, 21.8% from 45 to 64, and 21.9% who were 65 years of age or older. The median age was 40 years. For every 100 females, there were 82.9 males. For every 100 females age 18 and over, there were 82.1 males.

The median income for a household in the town was $24,605, and the median income for a family was $27,292. Males had a median income of $25,600 versus $19,118 for females. The per capita income for the town was $13,094. About 23.1% of families and 25.8% of the population were below the poverty line, including 31.0% of those under age 18 and 19.1% of those age 65 or over.
