= List of metropolitan areas of South Carolina =

This is a list of metropolitan areas of South Carolina, a state in the Southeastern United States. It is bordered to the north by North Carolina; to the south and west by Georgia, located across the Savannah River; and to the east by the Atlantic Ocean.

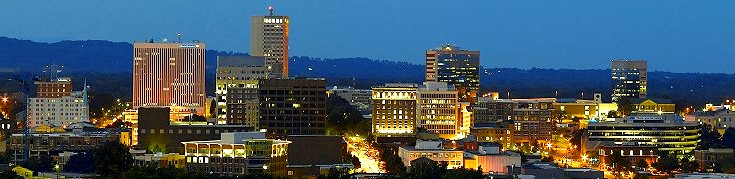
Greenville is the largest metropolitan and combined statistical area in South Carolina.

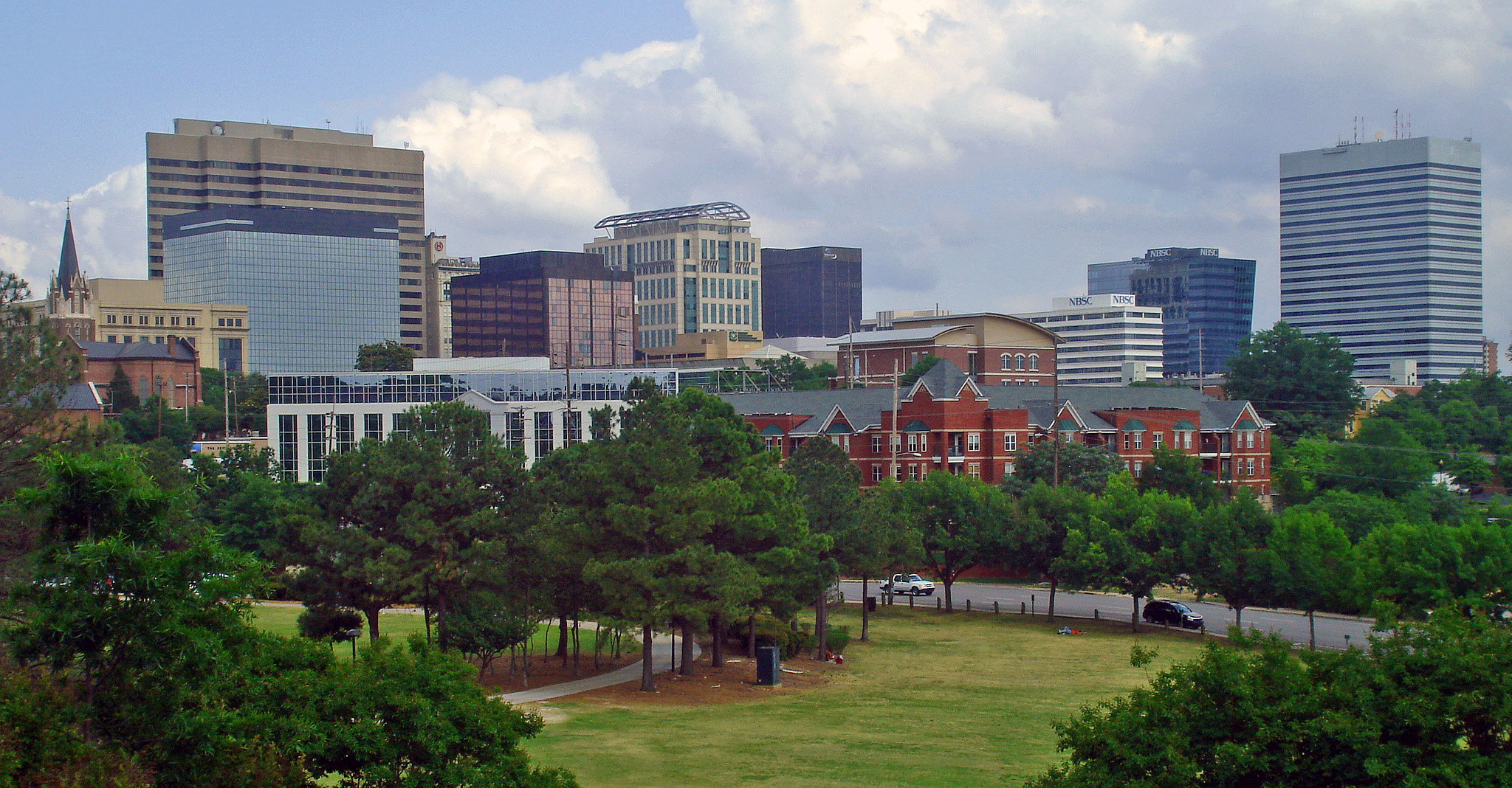
Columbia is the second largest city, metropolitan, and combined statistical area in South Carolina.

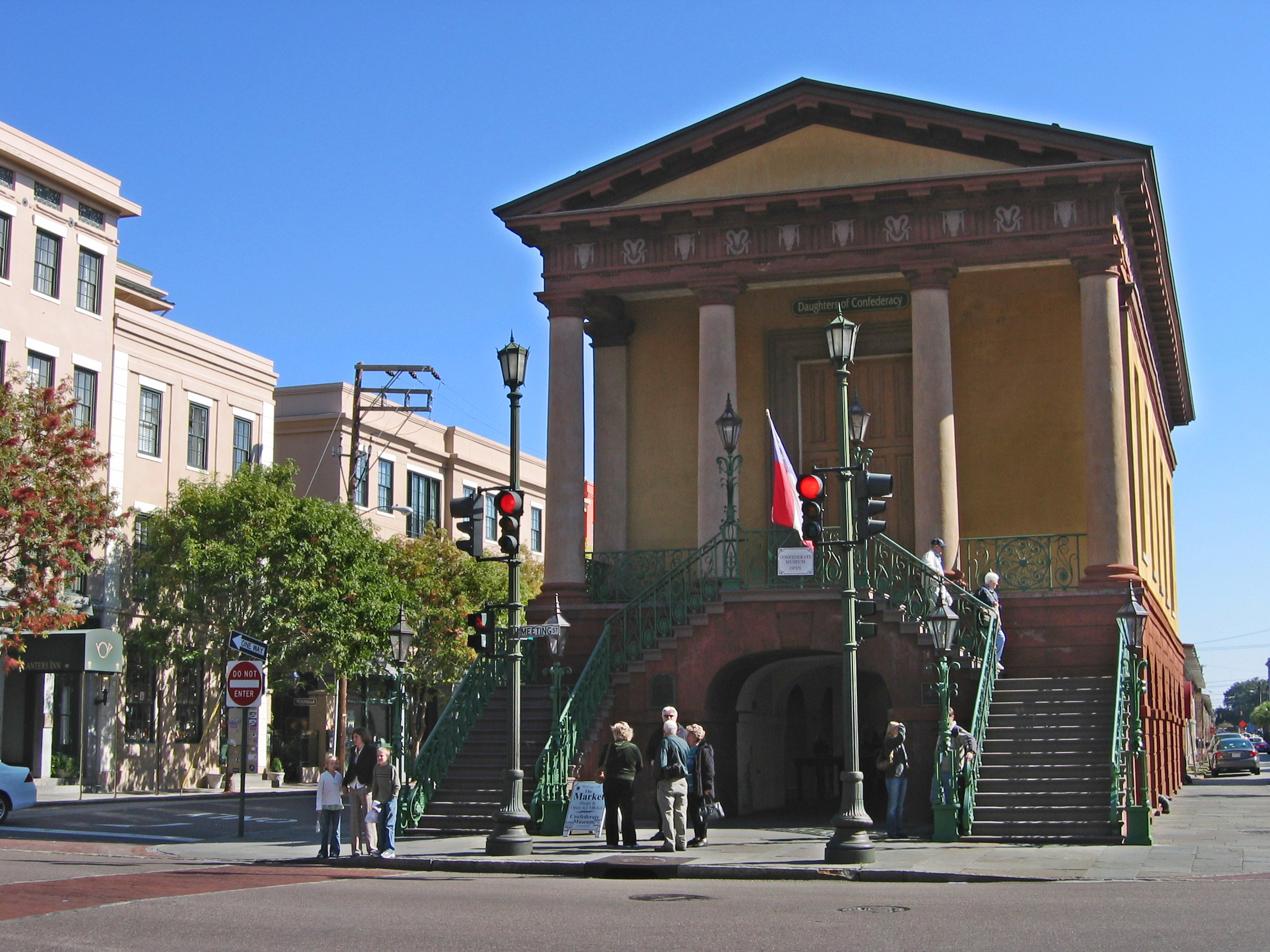
Charleston is the largest city in South Carolina but third largest metropolitan area.

Rank	Metropolitan statistical area (MSA)	Population (2020)
1	Greenville-Anderson-Greer	928,195
2	Columbia	829,470
3	Charleston-North Charleston	799,636
4	Spartanburg	355,241
5	Myrtle Beach-Conway-North Myrtle Beach	351,029
6	Hilton Head Island-Bluffton-Port Royal	215,908
7	Florence	199,964
8	Sumter	105,556
	Total	3,784,999

Rank	Combined Statistical Area	Population (2020)
1	Greenville-Spartanburg-Anderson	1,487,610
2	Columbia-Sumter-Orangeburg	951,412
3	Myrtle Beach-Conway	551,126
	Total	2,990,148

== See also ==
- Table of United States Metropolitan Statistical Areas
- Table of United States Combined Statistical Areas
