= Lake City College Preparatory Academy =

Location
- 1009 E Main St; Lake City, SC, 29560; United States
- 33.856°N 79.7331°W

Information
- Type: Private
- Motto: World-class School of the Arts
- Established: 2007
- Grades: K to 12
- Enrollment: 75 (2016)
- Colors: Royal Blue and Gold
- Slogan: Why Not Give Art A Part In Making Your Child Smart!
- Mascot: Soaring Eagle
- Nickname: LCCPA
- Team name: Mighty Soaring Eagles
- Website: www.lakecitycollegeprepacademy.org

Lake City College Preparatory Academy is a nationally accredited private Christian school founded in 2007 and located in Lake City, South Carolina. In 2009 the school was granted a charter by the state of South Carolina. After admitting many at-risk students from the local public schools in the surrounding area, the school struggled trying to improve student academic achievement levels. In April 2014 the state superintendent announced that the school eventually received a "B" rating. In August 2014 its charter was revoked due to ongoing issues.
