= Kent Lee =

Kent Lee may refer to:

- Kent Lee (admiral)
- Kent Lee (politician)
