= Lake City Downtown Historic District =

Historic district in South Carolina, United States

- U.S. National Register of Historic Places
- U.S. Historic district
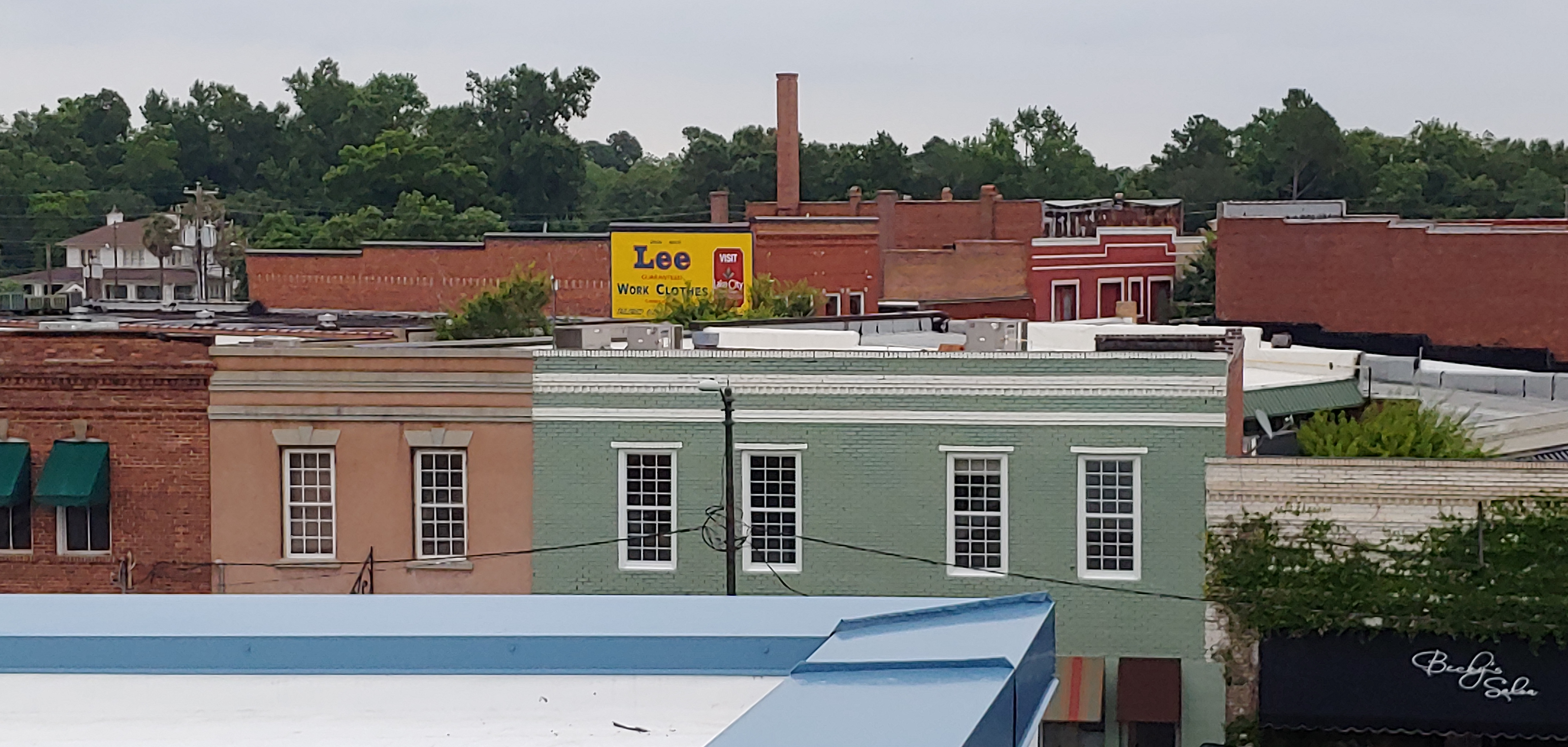

- Location within South Carolina Location within the United States
- Location: Main St and Acline Ave., Lake City, South Carolina
- Coordinates: 33°52′22″N 79°45′17″W
- Area: 10.5 acres (4.2 ha)
- Architectural style: Late 19th And Early 20th Century American Movements
- NRHP reference No.: 01001551
- Added to NRHP: January 24, 2003

Lake City Downtown Historic District is a national historic district located at Lake City, Florence County, South Carolina. The district encompasses 44 contributing buildings in the central business district of Lake City. The district's buildings were built between about 1910 and 1930. The district's buildings reflect the one- and two-part commercial blocks found in towns throughout the nation, and represent stylistic influences ranging from the late Victorian period examples displaying elaborate brick corbeled cornices and pediments to the more simplified and stripped down Depression-era examples with typical low relief detailing and vertical piers. Corner stores and banks featuring either a Classical or Renaissance Revival style and the brick depot and surrounding brick warehouses help anchor the district along both the town's Main Street and its broad intersecting railroad corridor. Notable buildings include the Singletary Building, Lake City State Bank, Floyd's Drug Co./ Strickland's Jewelers, Eagles Five and Ten Cent Store, Weaver's Drug Store Co., Truluck Hotel, Atlantic Coast Railroad Depot, and Farmers' and Merchant Bank.

It was listed on the National Register of Historic Places in 2003.
