= ArtFields =

- Genre: Arts organization and festival
- Frequency: Annual festival with year-round programs
- Location: Lake City, South Carolina
- Prize money: Over $100,000
- Website: artfieldssc.org

ArtFields is an American organization that hosts the arts festival of the same name in Lake City, South Carolina. ArtFields is the largest art competition in the southeastern United States. The organization also hosts year-round exhibitions and a public art program.

== History ==
ArtFields competition and festival was founded by investor Darla Moore in her hometown of Lake City, South Carolina. She cofounded the festival with a group of women from Lake City, including Carla Angus, the festival's program director. Historically, Lake City was an important producer of tobacco, green bean and strawberry crops. The town's economy suffered from the decline of the tobacco market, and because it was bypassed when the interstate highways were built.

The inaugural festival was held in 2013, and ran for 10-days. It had approximately 10,000 attendees, and generated an estimated $5 million of tourism, employment, and construction. It became a 17-day festival that occurs every April.

The organization supports arts initiatives and exhibitions year-round.

After the organization's founding, the number of public art installations, hotels and restaurants in Lake City increased. New art studios and galleries were also founded in the town, and artists began to relocate there. The Jones-Carter Gallery opened in 2013 in a renovated feed-and-seed store, and the TRAX Visual Art Center opened in 2018. In 2024, ArtFields opened Acline Studios which includes eight individual artist studios and hosts exhibitions.

The festival has caused increased foot traffic for institutions in Lake City like the Ronald E. McNair Life History Center.

== Competition ==
The competition offers over $100,000 in cash prizes, including a $50,000 grand prize and several juried or people's choice awards. The festival exhibits works by contemporary artists in the Southeastern United States; competitors must reside in Alabama, Arkansas, Florida, Georgia, Kentucky, Louisiana, Mississippi, North Carolina, South Carolina, Tennessee, Virginia or West Virginia. During the festival, art from the competition is exhibited in local venues like restaurants, barbershops, and warehouses.

Winning artworks from the competition are kept in a permanent collection. The collection has been exhibited at museums like the 701 Center for Contemporary Art in Columbia, South Carolina. In 2025, the Franklin G. Burroughs-Simeon B. Chapin Art Museum in Myrtle Beach, South Carolina exhibited previous winners of Grand Prize, Second Place and People’s Choice awards.

The festival also includes programs like workshops, food, concerts, games, and book signings.

The ArtFields Jr. program hosts art classes, workshops, and a competition for students in Grade 1 through Grade 12.
