= Danwood, South Carolina =

- Census-designated place
- Location within South Carolina Location within the United States
- Coordinates: 34°05′25″N 79°46′10″W
- Country: United States
- State: South Carolina
- County: Florence

Area
  - Total: 1.90 sq mi (4.92 km^{2})
  - Land: 1.90 sq mi (4.92 km^{2})
  - Water: 0 sq mi (0.00 km^{2})
- Elevation: 105 ft (32 m)

Population (2020)
  - Total: 453
  - Density: 238.6/sq mi (92.14/km^{2})
- Time zone: UTC-5 (Eastern (EST))
  - Summer (DST): UTC-4 (EDT)
- ZIP Codes: 29541 (Effingham); 29505 (Florence)
- Area codes: 843/854
- FIPS code: 45-18475
- GNIS feature ID: 2812954

Danwood is an unincorporated community and census-designated place (CDP) in Florence County, South Carolina, United States. It was first listed as a CDP prior to the 2020 census with a population of 453.

The CDP is in central Florence County, along U.S. Routes 301 and 52, 8 miles (13 km) south of Florence and 1.5 miles (2.4 km) north of Effingham.

== Demographics ==
Historical population
Census	Pop.	Note	%±
2020	453		—
U.S. Decennial Census; 2020

Danwood first appeared as a census designated place in the 2020 U.S. census.

=== 2020 census ===
Danwood CDP, South Carolina – Demographic Profile (NH = Non-Hispanic)
Race / Ethnicity	Pop 2020	% 2020
White alone (NH)	408	90.07%
Black or African American alone (NH)	22	4.86%
Native American or Alaska Native alone (NH)	1	0.22%
Asian alone (NH)	0	0.00%
Pacific Islander alone (NH)	0	0.00%
Some Other Race alone (NH)	0	0.00%
Mixed Race/Multi-Racial (NH)	9	1.99%
Hispanic or Latino (any race)	13	2.87%
Total	453	100.00%

Note: the US Census treats Hispanic/Latino as an ethnic category. This table excludes Latinos from the racial categories and assigns them to a separate category. Hispanics/Latinos can be of any race.
