= Olanta, South Carolina =

- Town
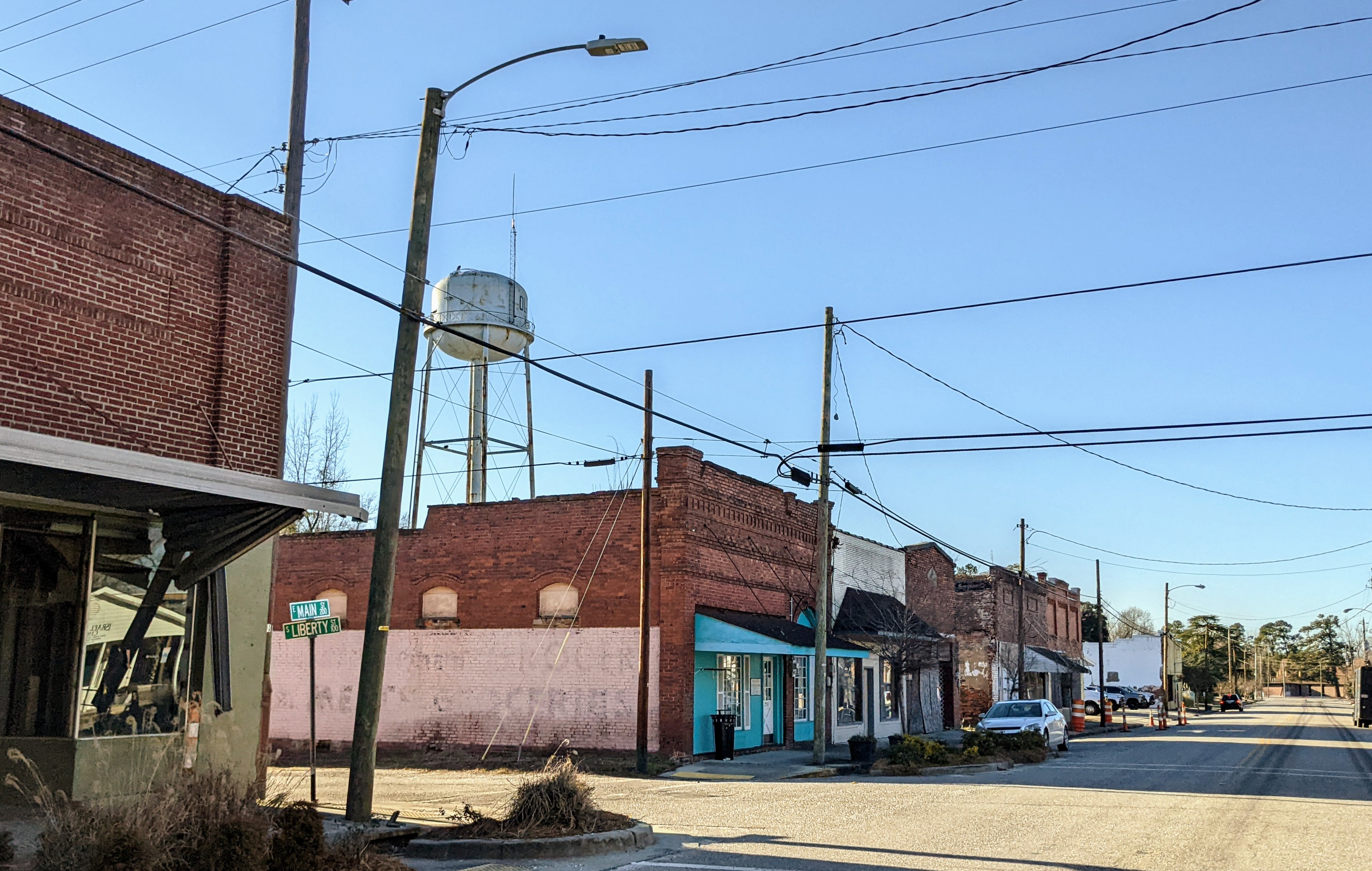
- Downtown Olanta

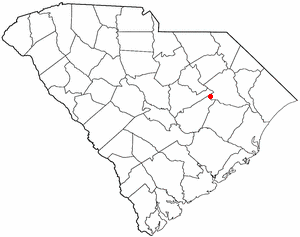
- Location of Olanta in South Carolina
- Coordinates: 33°56′09″N 79°55′55″W
- Country: United States
- State: South Carolina
- County: Florence

Area
  - Total: 1.00 sq mi (2.59 km^{2})
  - Land: 1.00 sq mi (2.58 km^{2})
  - Water: 0.0039 sq mi (0.01 km^{2})
- Elevation: 112 ft (34 m)

Population (2020)
  - Total: 550
  - Density: 552.9/sq mi (213.47/km^{2})
- Time zone: UTC-5 (EST)
  - Summer (DST): UTC-4 (EDT)
- ZIP code: 29114
- Area codes: 843, 854
- FIPS code: 45-52540
- GNIS feature ID: 2407042
- Website: www.olantasc.com

Olanta is a town in Florence County, South Carolina, United States. As of the 2020 census, Olanta had a population of 550. It is part of the Florence Metropolitan Statistical Area.

== Geography ==
Olanta is located in south Florence County. U.S. Route 301 passes through the town as Jones Road, leading northeast 24 miles (39 km) to Florence, the county seat, and southwest 23 miles (37 km) to Manning. South Carolina Highway 341 leads northwest from Olanta 13 miles (21 km) to Lynchburg and southeast 13 miles to Lake City. South Carolina Highway 541 leads east 12 miles (19 km) to Coward.

According to the United States Census Bureau, the town has a total area of 1.0 square mile (2.6 km^{2}), of which 0.004 square miles (0.01 km^{2}), or 0.44%, is water.

== Demographics ==
Historical population
| Census | Pop. | Note | %± |
|---|---|---|---|
| 1910 | 230 | | — |
| 1920 | 409 | | 77.8% |
| 1930 | 433 | | 5.9% |
| 1940 | 515 | | 18.9% |
| 1950 | 586 | | 13.8% |
| 1960 | 568 | | −3.1% |
| 1970 | 640 | | 12.7% |
| 1980 | 699 | | 9.2% |
| 1990 | 687 | | −1.7% |
| 2000 | 613 | | −10.8% |
| 2010 | 563 | | −8.2% |
| 2020 | 550 | | −2.3% |
U.S. Decennial Census

As of the census of 2000, there were 613 people, 206 households, and 133 families residing in the town. The population density was 632.3 inhabitants per square mile (244.1/km^{2}). There were 223 housing units at an average density of 230.0 per square mile (88.8/km^{2}). The racial makeup of the town was 61.34% White, 37.52% African American, 0.98% from other races, and 0.16% from two or more races. Hispanic or Latino of any race were 1.14% of the population.

There were 206 households, out of which 28.2% had children under the age of 18 living with them, 40.8% were married couples living together, 20.4% had a female householder with no husband present, and 35.4% were non-families. 32.0% of all households were made up of individuals, and 14.1% had someone living alone who was 65 years of age or older. The average household size was 2.47 and the average family size was 3.15.

In the town, the population was spread out, with 21.4% under the age of 18, 7.3% from 18 to 24, 27.2% from 25 to 44, 22.7% from 45 to 64, and 21.4% who were 65 years of age or older. The median age was 41 years. For every 100 females, there were 95.2 males. For every 100 females age 18 and over, there were 105.1 males.

The median income for a household in the town was $27,813, and the median income for a family was $27,813. Males had a median income of $28,438 versus $17,361 for females. The per capita income for the town was $12,606. About 17.8% of families and 28.5% of the population were below the poverty line, including 54.0% of those under age 18 and 11.7% of those age 65 or over.

== Education ==
Olanta has a public library, a branch of the Florence County Library System.
