= Cartersville, South Carolina =

Settlement in South Carolina, United States

Coordinates: 34°05′11″N 80°01′43″W

Cartersville is an unincorporated community in Florence County, in the U.S. state of South Carolina.

== History ==
The community was named after the Carter family of early settlers. A post office called Cartersville was established in 1845, and remained in operation until 1953.

Local Businesses

Cartersville Country Winery - Local winery and part of the Harvest Host program.
