= Browntown (Johnsonville, South Carolina) =

- U.S. National Register of Historic Places
- U.S. Historic district
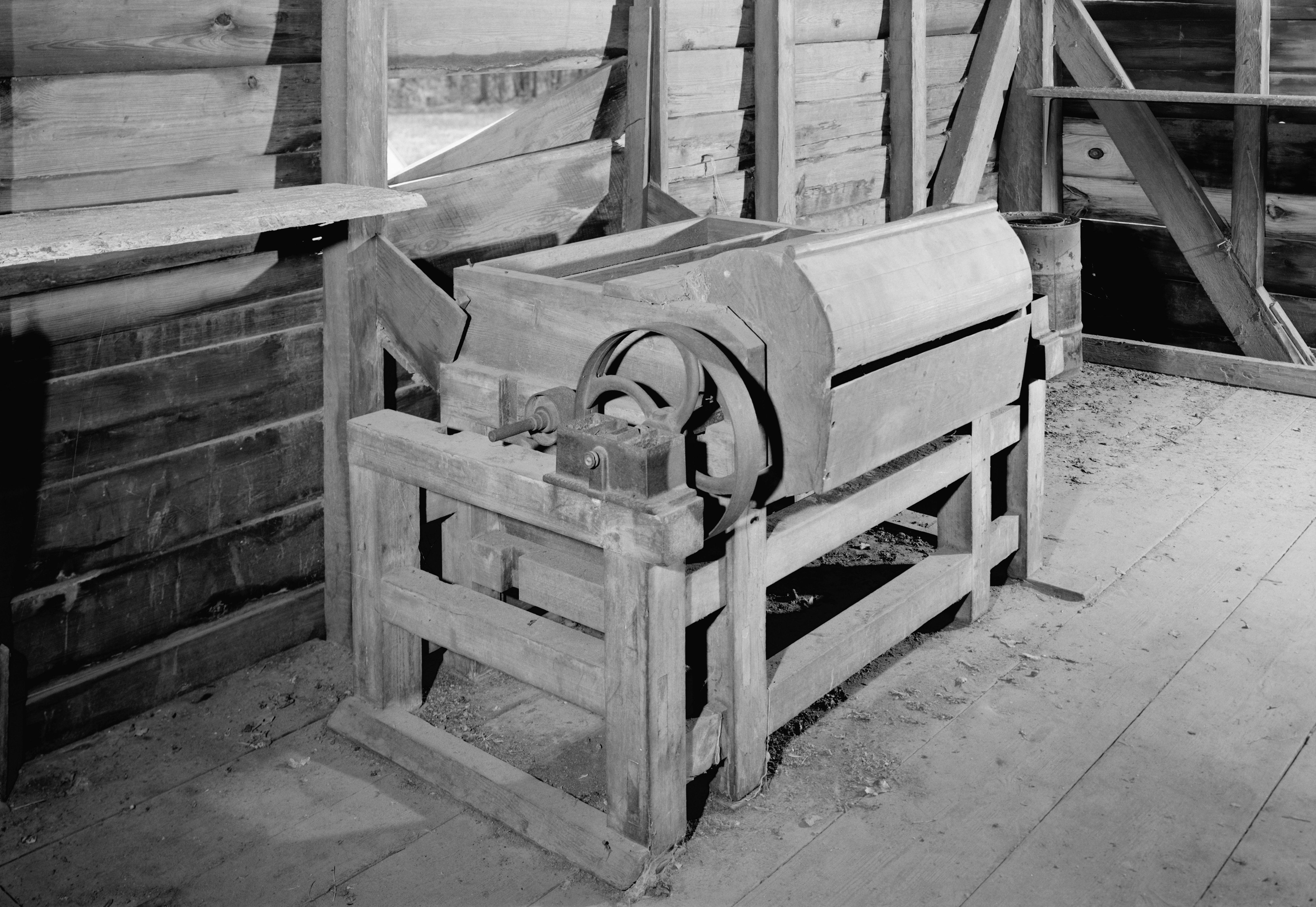
- Browntown Cotton Gin, HAER Photo, March 1987

- Location within South Carolina Location within the United States
- Location: South Carolina Highway 341, near Johnsonville, South Carolina
- Coordinates: 33°47′59″N 79°37′49″W
- Area: 104 acres (42 ha)
- Architect: Multiple
- NRHP reference No.: 82003850
- Added to NRHP: June 28, 1982

Browntown is a national historic district located near Johnsonville, Florence County, South Carolina. The district encompasses 7 contributing buildings and 4 contributing structures reflecting the self-sufficient way of life practiced by several generations of the Brown family during the 19th and early-20th centuries. Moses Brown and his son and grandsons were self-sufficient farmers who operated their own brick kiln, grist mill, lumber mill, cotton gin, retail and wholesale mercantile business, and school. The property nominated includes the cotton gin building, three residences, the school, a tobacco barn, and several outbuildings. Browntown includes examples of both log and frame construction, and are grouped in two complexes, one group adjacent to the road and the other across the fields around the cotton gin building.

It was listed on the National Register of Historic Places in 1983.
