= Bonnie Shade =

Historic house in South Carolina, United States

- U.S. National Register of Historic Places
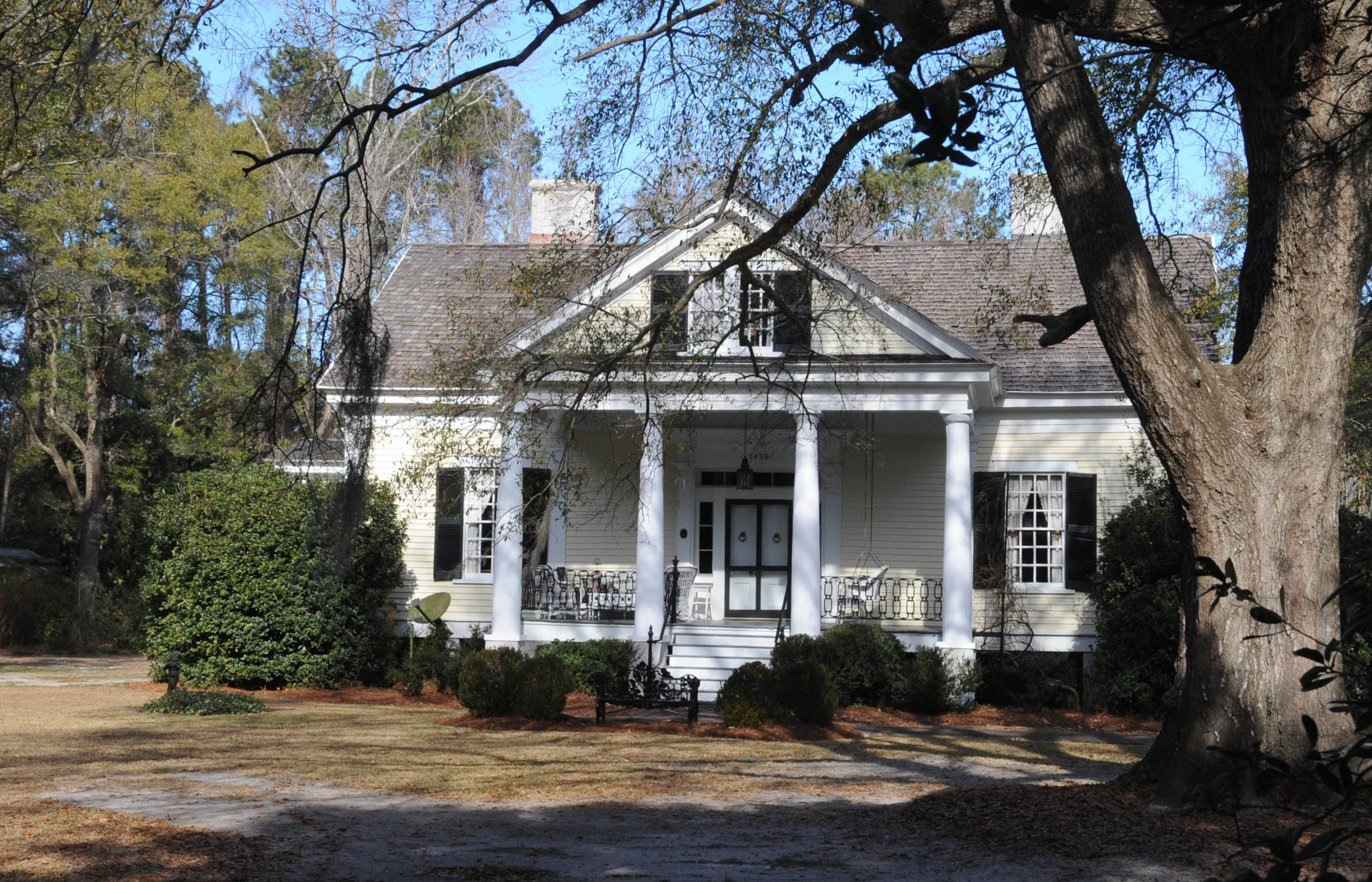

- Location within South Carolina Location within the United States
- Location: 1439 Cherokee Rd., Florence, South Carolina
- Coordinates: 34°11′7″N 79°47′40″W
- Area: 1.5 acres (0.61 ha)
- Built: 1854
- Architectural style: Greek Revival, Raised Cottage
- NRHP reference No.: 78002506
- Added to NRHP: November 14, 1978

Bonnie Shade is a historic plantation house located at Florence, Florence County, South Carolina. It was built in 1854, and is a mid-19th century Greek Revival style raised cottage. It features corner pilasters and free-standing columns supporting the pediment and portico.

It was listed on the National Register of Historic Places in 1978.
