= Young Farm (Florence, South Carolina) =

- Formerly listed on the U.S. National Register of Historic Places
- U.S. Historic district
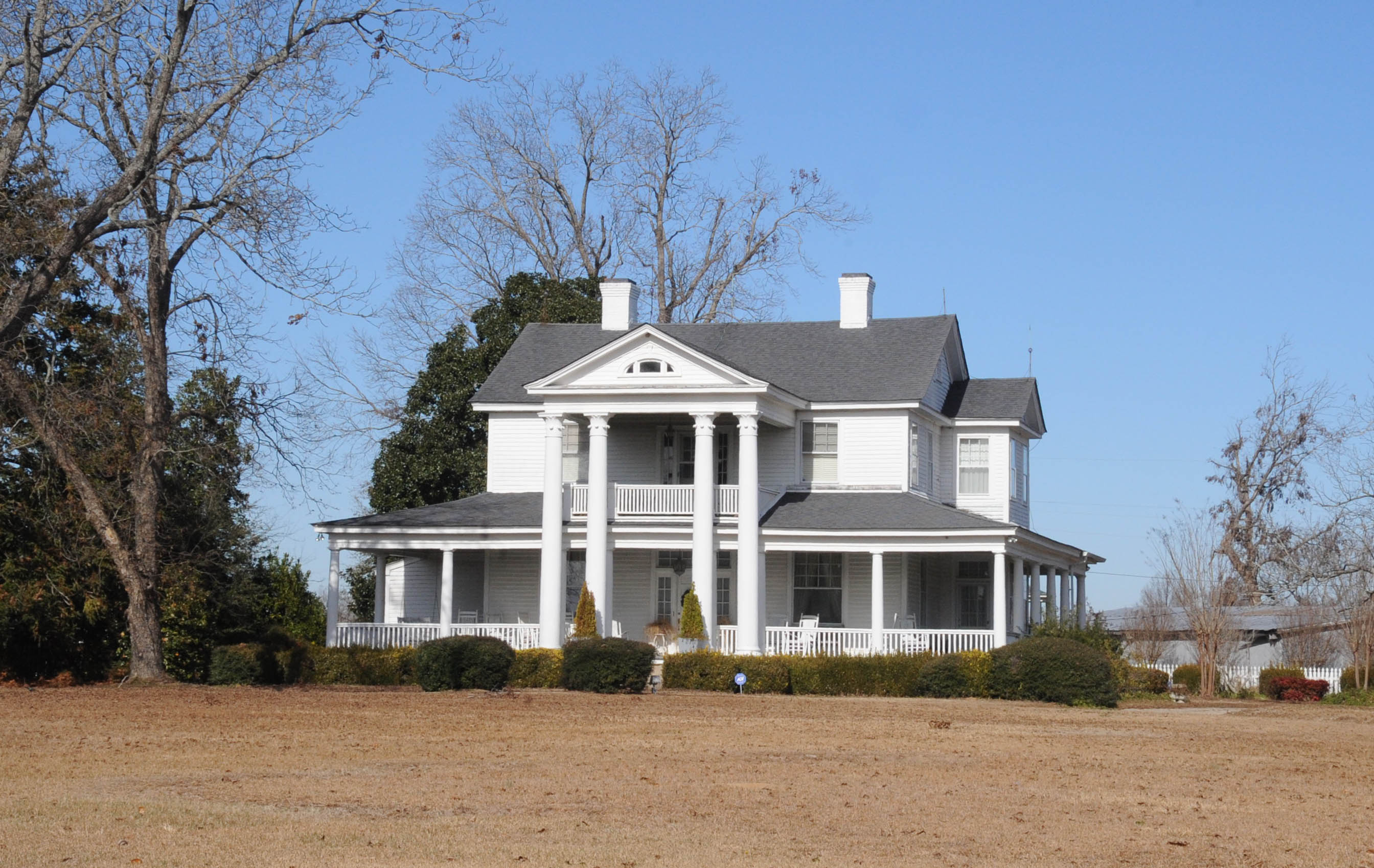

- Location within South Carolina Location within the United States
- Location: West of Florence on U.S. Route 76, near Florence, South Carolina
- Coordinates: 34°9′28″N 79°52′15″W
- Area: 8.4 acres (3.4 ha)
- Built: 1919
- NRHP reference No.: 83003854

Significant dates
- Added to NRHP: November 10, 1983
- Removed from NRHP: August 1, 2025

Young Farm is a historic farm complex and national historic district located near Florence, Florence County, South Carolina. The district encompasses 5 contributing buildings and 1 contributing structure associated with the dairy farm of Fred H. Young. The complex consists of a two-story frame main residence and a collection of outbuildings including a dairy barn, truck shed, cow shed, and silos. Fred H. Young, a farmer and partner in Young's Pedigreed Seed Farms, won regard throughout the South for his high-grade cottonseed and cattle. In July of 2024, the house was said to be too far gone to save and was torn down.

It was listed on the National Register of Historic Places in 1983, and was delisted in 2025.
