= Derrick Faison =

American football player (1967–2004)

No. 89
- Position: Wide receiver

Personal information
- Born: August 24, 1967; Lake City, South Carolina, U.S.
- Died: June 27, 2004 (aged 36); Lake Forest, California
- Listed height: 6 ft 4 in (1.93 m)
- Listed weight: 200 lb (91 kg)

Career information
- High school: Lake City (SC)
- College: Howard
- NFL draft: 1990: undrafted

Career history
- Los Angeles Rams (1990); San Diego Chargers (1992)*; San Francisco 49ers (1993)*
- * Offseason or practice squad member only

Career NFL statistics
- Receptions: 3
- Receiving yards: 27
- Touchdowns: 1
- Stats at Pro Football Reference

Derrick Leon Faison (August 24, 1967 – June 27, 2004) was an American professional football player who played wide receiver for one season for the Los Angeles Rams. He played both football and basketball at Howard University.

== Early life ==
Faison attended Lake City High School in Lake City, South Carolina, where he was a standout on the football team at the tight end position. As a junior, he made 24 receptions for 847 yards and seven touchdowns. As a senior, Faison made 30 receptions for 723 yards and six touchdowns. He was selected to play in the South Carolina North-South All-Star Game. Faison also played basketball at Lake City, earning honorable mention all-state honors as a senior after averaging 21.5 points and 11.5 rebounds per game.

== College career ==
Faison played four years of college football for the Howard Bison football team, scoring 21 touchdowns on 47 career receptions as a wide receiver in a run-heavy offense. However, after playing sparingly as a freshman, Faison falsely believed that he had been redshirted. Ahead of his fifth season in 1989, he was one of nine Bison football players who were ruled ineligible.

Per NCAA eligibility rules, Faison was allowed to play a different sport for his fifth year, so he joined the Howard Bison men's basketball team as a forward for the 1989–90 season. He had spent the previous three years as an "individual standout" in the Howard intramural basketball league. Faison also joined the Bison track team.

== Professional career ==
After going unselected in the 1990 NFL draft, Faison signed with the Los Angeles Rams as an undrafted free agent.
