= Red Doe =

Historic house in South Carolina, United States

- U.S. National Register of Historic Places
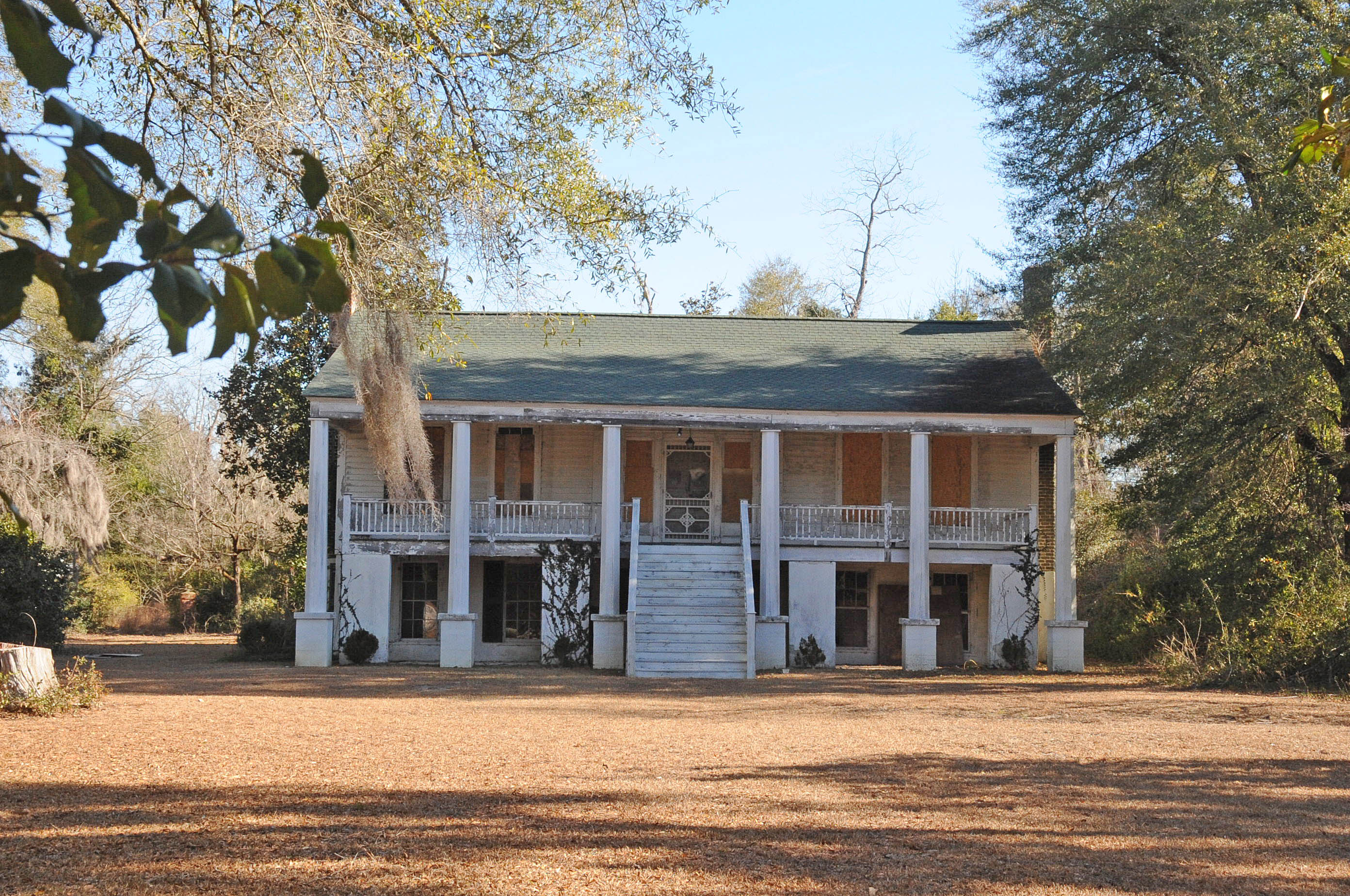

- Location within South Carolina Location within the United States
- Location: East of Florence on South Carolina Highway 327, near Florence, South Carolina
- Coordinates: 34°10′29″N 79°38′51″W
- Area: 9 acres (3.6 ha)
- Built: c. 1840
- NRHP reference No.: 82001521
- Added to NRHP: October 29, 1982

Red Doe, also known as the Evander Gregg House, is a historic home located near Florence, Florence County, South Carolina. It was built about 1840, and is a one-story, rectangular frame farmhouse on a raised brick basement foundation. It has a central hall plan, a two-room rear ell on the rear, and low-pitched gable roof. The front façade features six solid octagonal wooden piers support the porch roof and full-width verandah. Also on the property is a small frame building that appears to have been used as an office or store.

It was listed on the National Register of Historic Places in 1982.
