= Windhams Crossroads, South Carolina =

Unincorporated area in South Carolina, US

Coordinates: 34°12′03″N 80°02′01″W

Windhams Crossroads, South Carolina, is an unincorporated area of land where South Carolina Highway 403 and U.S. Route 401 cross near Lamar in Darlington County, South Carolina, named after the Windham surname. The area is documented in the 1825 Atlas of South Carolina by Robert Mills. Charles Windham arrived in the colony of Virginia in 1706 on a ship captained by Col. Robert Boiling. He eventually left to settle in the area of what was then called Craven County, South Carolina, where he petitioned and received a royal land grant of 300 acres in 1754 from the Council of King George II of Great Britain. Other land in this area is attributed to Charles' son Amos Windham, who received seven hundred acres in royal land grants between 1769 and 1772. During the Revolutionary War, Amos Windham served in the South Carolina Militia. He received his appointment as Lieutenant on February 21, 1776, in the St. David's Parish, and began his service in Colonel G.C. Powell's Regiment. He served as Captain during 1781, 1782, and 1783 in Colonel Kolb's Regiment, Marion's Brigade, and was commissioned Major after the war ended. Following the Revolutionary War, Major Amos Windham received thousands of acres in state land grants between 1785 and 1795 in Cheraw District, which was formerly Craven County and later became Darlington County.
