= Coward, South Carolina =

- Town
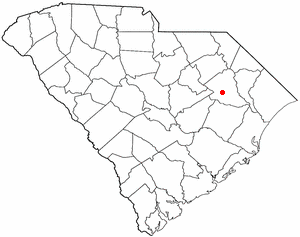
- Location of Coward in South Carolina
- Coordinates: 33°58′20″N 79°45′12″W
- Country: United States
- State: South Carolina
- County: Florence

Area
  - Total: 3.53 sq mi (9.15 km^{2})
  - Land: 3.53 sq mi (9.15 km^{2})
  - Water: 0 sq mi (0.00 km^{2})
- Elevation: 85 ft (26 m)

Population (2020)
  - Total: 748
  - Density: 211.8/sq mi (81.79/km^{2})
- Time zone: UTC-5 (EST)
  - Summer (DST): UTC-4 (EDT)
- ZIP code: 29530
- Area codes: 843, 854
- FIPS code: 45-17215
- GNIS feature ID: 2406328
- Website: townofcoward.com

Coward is a town in Florence County, South Carolina, United States. As of the 2020 census, Coward had a population of 748. It is part of the Florence Metropolitan Statistical Area.

== History ==
The town was likely named after either Captain Solomon Coward, a major land owner in the region or former Confederate Colonel Asbury Coward who would later become Commandant of the South Carolina Military Academy.

Much of Coward's pre-incorporation economy centered around cash crops like tobacco or cotton. The town's economy was also supported by a local sawmill.

The town was incorporated in 1963.

In recent years the town has been troubled by rising water levels in the Lynches River and increased flooding as a result.

== Geography ==
Coward is in south-central Florence County. U.S. Route 52 runs through the center of town, leading north 16 miles (26 km) to Florence, the county seat, and south 7 miles (11 km) to Lake City. South Carolina Highway 541 leads west from Coward 12 miles (19 km) to Olanta.

According to the United States Census Bureau, the town of Coward has a total area of 3.5 square miles (9.1 km^{2}), of which 0.637 acres (2,576 m^{2}), or 0.03%, is water. The town is in the watershed of the Lynches River, a tributary of the Pee Dee River.

== Demographics ==
Historical population
Census	Pop.	Note	%±
1970	466		—
1980	428		−8.2%
1990	532		24.3%
2000	650		22.2%
2010	752		15.7%
2020	748		−0.5%
U.S. Decennial Census

As of the census of 2000, there were 650 people, 246 households, and 178 families residing in the town. The population density was 189.9 inhabitants per square mile (73.3/km^{2}). There were 263 housing units at an average density of 76.8 per square mile (29.7/km^{2}). The racial makeup of the town was 84.15% White, 14.00% African American, 0.15% Asian, 0.62% from other races, and 1.08% from two or more races. Hispanic or Latino of any race were 1.38% of the population.

There were 246 households, out of which 32.9% had children under the age of 18 living with them, 56.1% were married couples living together, 12.2% had a female householder with no husband present, and 27.6% were non-families. 24.8% of all households were made up of individuals, and 8.1% had someone living alone who was 65 years of age or older. The average household size was 2.64 and the average family size was 3.17.

In the town, the population was spread out, with 26.2% under the age of 18, 9.7% from 18 to 24, 28.8% from 25 to 44, 25.5% from 45 to 64, and 9.8% who were 65 years of age or older. The median age was 35 years. For every 100 females, there were 98.8 males. For every 100 females age 18 and over, there were 94.3 males.

The median income for a household in the town was $28,182, and the median income for a family was $30,208. Males had a median income of $28,977 versus $17,039 for females. The per capita income for the town was $12,711. About 16.1% of families and 24.4% of the population were below the poverty line, including 37.2% of those under age of 18 and 43.2% of those aged 65 or over.
