= Rankin-Harwell House =

Historic house in South Carolina, United States

- U.S. National Register of Historic Places
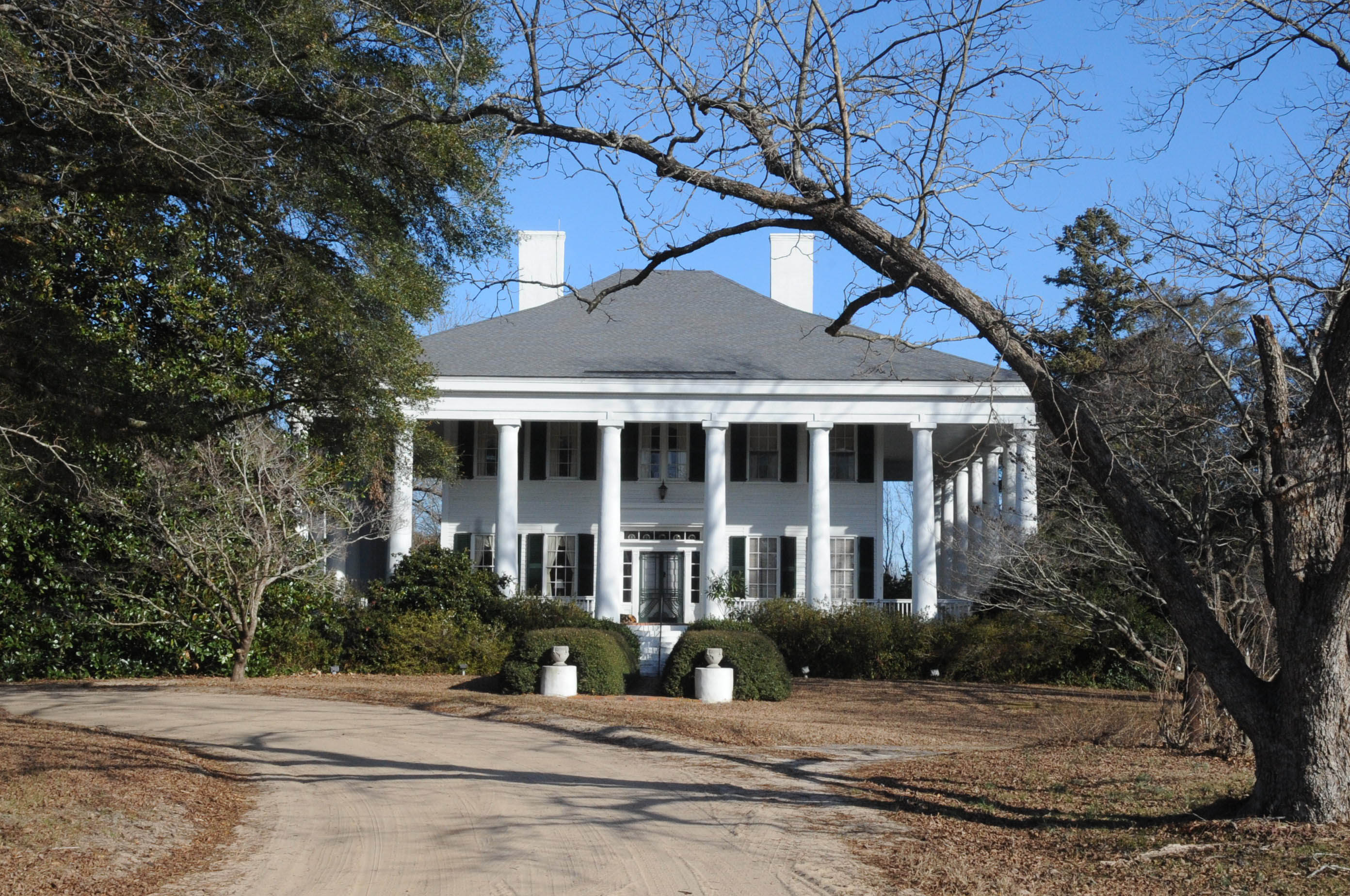
- House in 2017

- Location within South Carolina Location within the United States
- Location: 6 miles northeast of Florence off South Carolina Highway 305, near Florence, South Carolina
- Coordinates: 34°14′.74″N 79°39′7″W
- Area: 2 acres (0.81 ha)
- Built: 1857
- Architectural style: Greek Revival, Doric
- NRHP reference No.: 74001855
- Added to NRHP: October 9, 1974

Rankin-Harwell House, also known as The Columns, Carolina Hall, and the James Harwell House, is a historic plantation house located near Florence, Florence County, South Carolina. It was built in 1857, and is a two-story, frame, Greek Revival style dwelling. It features 22 giant freestanding Doric order stuccoed brick columns that surround the house on three sides. It rests on a raised basement and has a low-pitched hipped roof.

It was listed on the National Register of Historic Places in 1974.

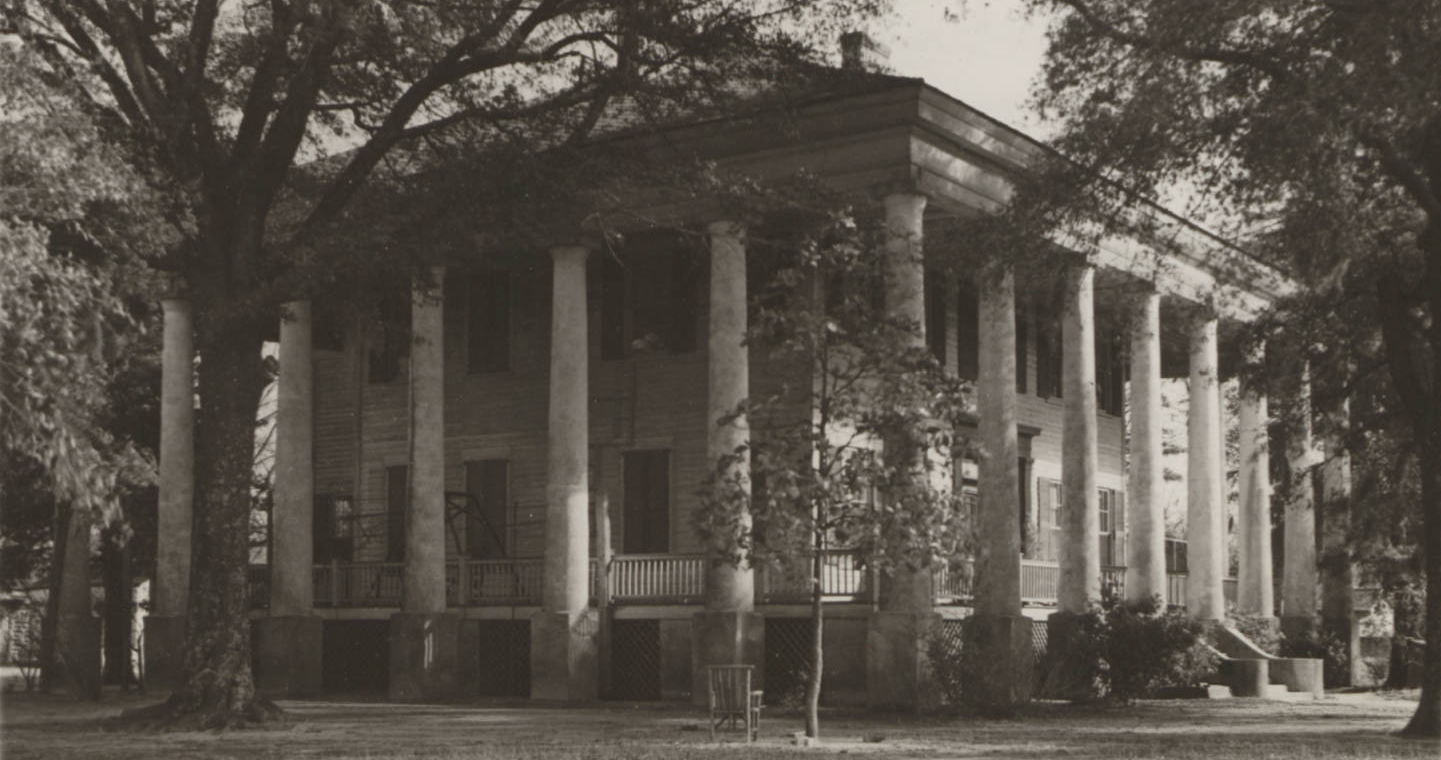
The Columns photographed by Carlisle Roberts for the W.P.A.
