= Florence Downtown Historic District =

Historic district in South Carolina, United States

- U.S. National Register of Historic Places
- U.S. Historic district
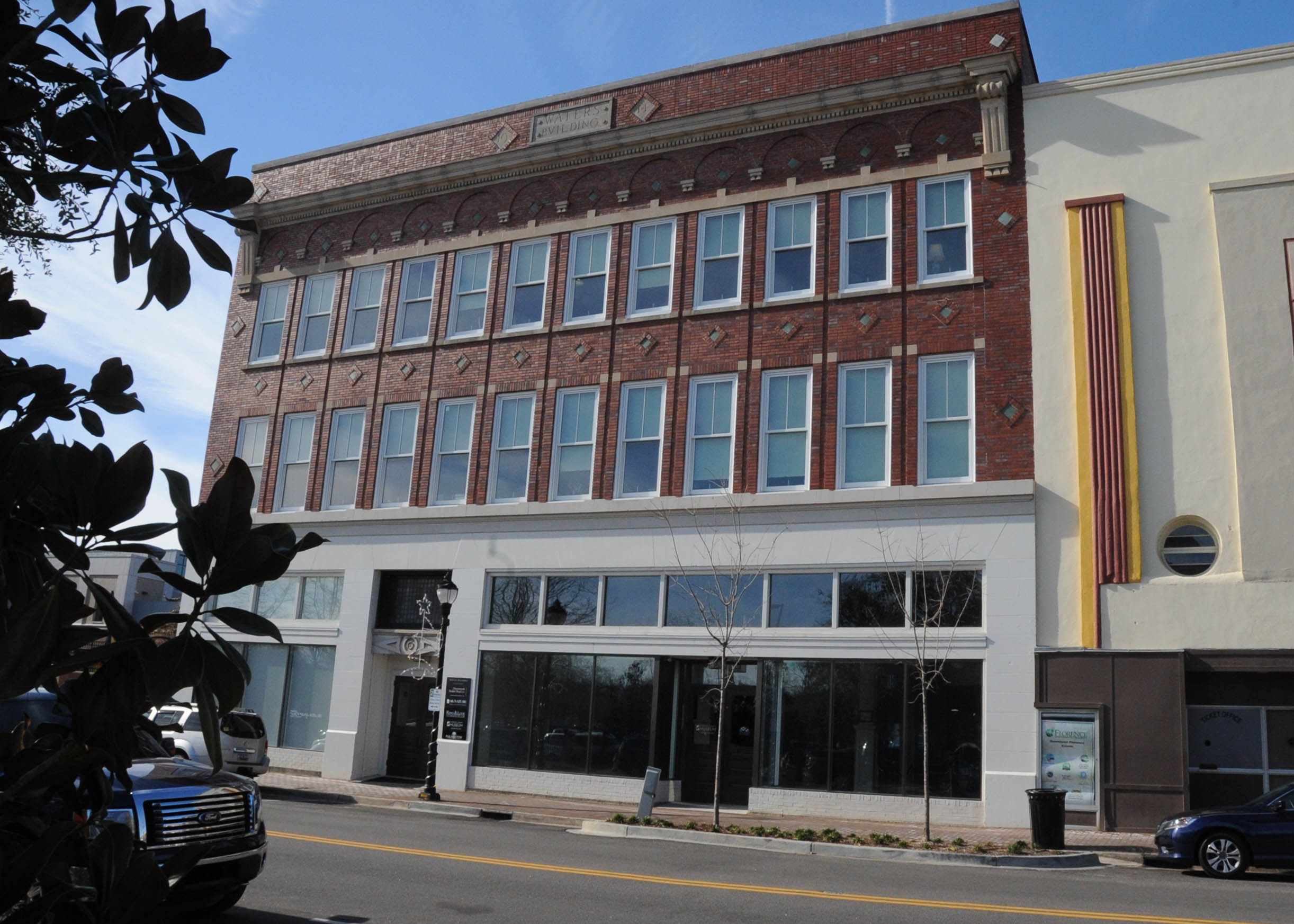
- W.M. Waters Building

- Location within South Carolina Location within the United States
- Location: Portions of West Evans, North Dargan St., and South Dargan St, Florence, South Carolina
- Coordinates: 34°11′52″N 79°45′59″W
- Area: 4.9 acres (2.0 ha)
- Architectural style: Late 19th And 20th Century Revivals
- NRHP reference No.: 08000621
- Added to NRHP: July 2, 2008

Florence Downtown Historic District is a national historic district located at Florence, Florence County, South Carolina. The district encompasses 24 contributing buildings in the central business district of Florence. The district's buildings were built between about 1890 and 1940. Most buildings are two-story brick buildings with embellished cornices. Many are characterized by flat rooflines, decorative brick moldings, and vertical pilasters. While all the properties have been modified to include modern storefronts, the upper facades are largely intact and retain their integrity.

It was listed on the National Register of Historic Places in 2008.
