= Florence Public Library =

- U.S. National Register of Historic Places
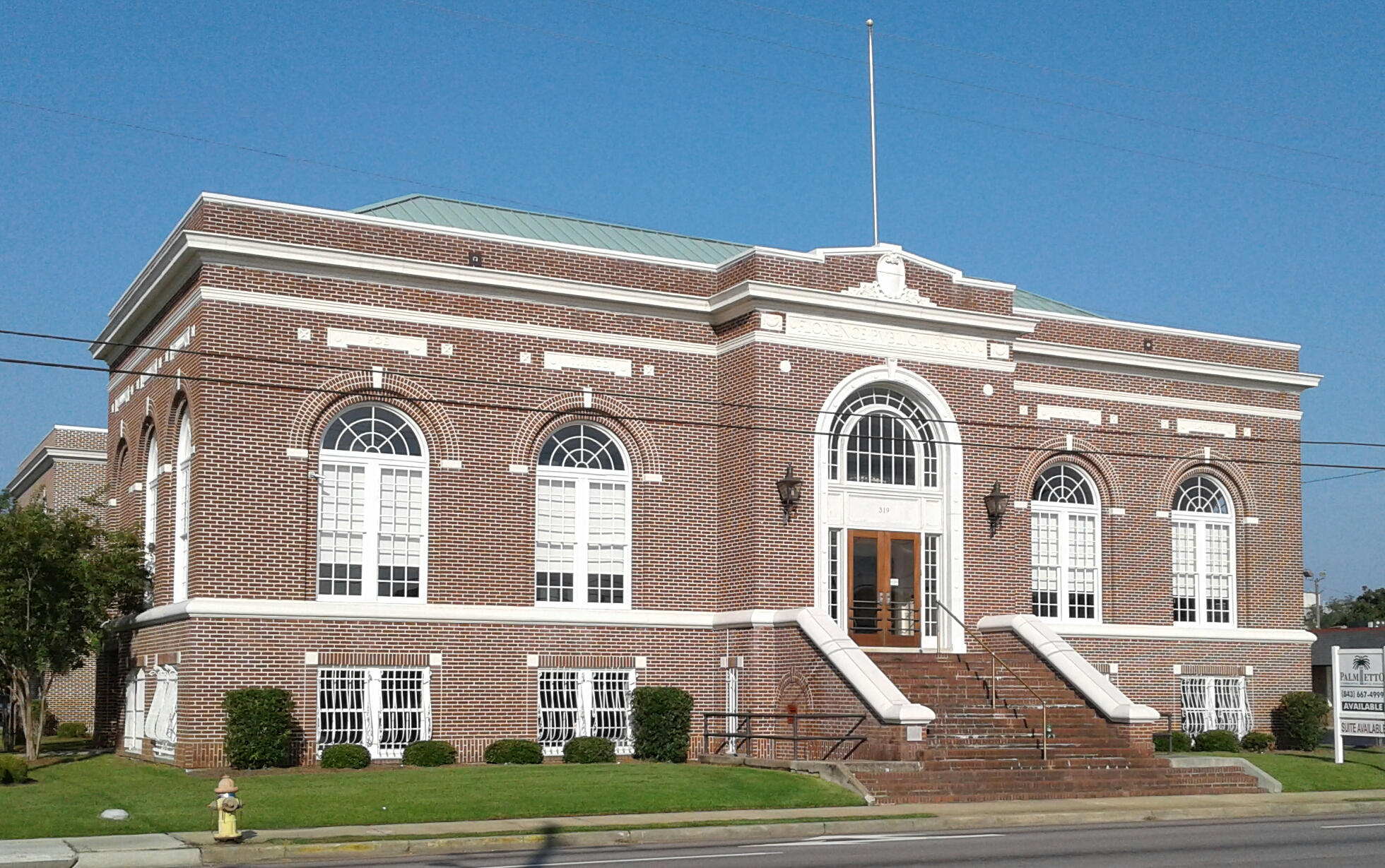

- Location within South Carolina Location within the United States
- Location: 319 S. Irby St., Florence, South Carolina
- Coordinates: 34°11′31″N 79°46′6″W
- Area: 1.1 acres (0.45 ha)
- Built: 1925, 1977-1978
- Architect: Wilkins & Hopkins; Haynesworth & Stuckey
- Architectural style: Classical Revival
- NRHP reference No.: 06001041
- Added to NRHP: November 15, 2006

Florence Public Library, also known as the Florence County Public Library, is a historic library building located at Florence, Florence County, South Carolina. It was built in 1925, and is a two-story-over-raised-basement, T-shaped brick veneered building with Neo-Classical Revival architecture and Beaux Arts design influences. It has a concrete foundation, reinforced concrete walls, limestone decorative elements, and a standing seam metal roof. It was the first public library in Florence. In 1977-1978 the library built a large one-story expansion and made extensive renovations to the original 1925 building.

It was listed on the National Register of Historic Places in 2006.
