= Florence metropolitan area, South Carolina =

Florence metropolitan area
- Metropolitan Statistical Area
- Florence, South Carolina metropolitan statistical area
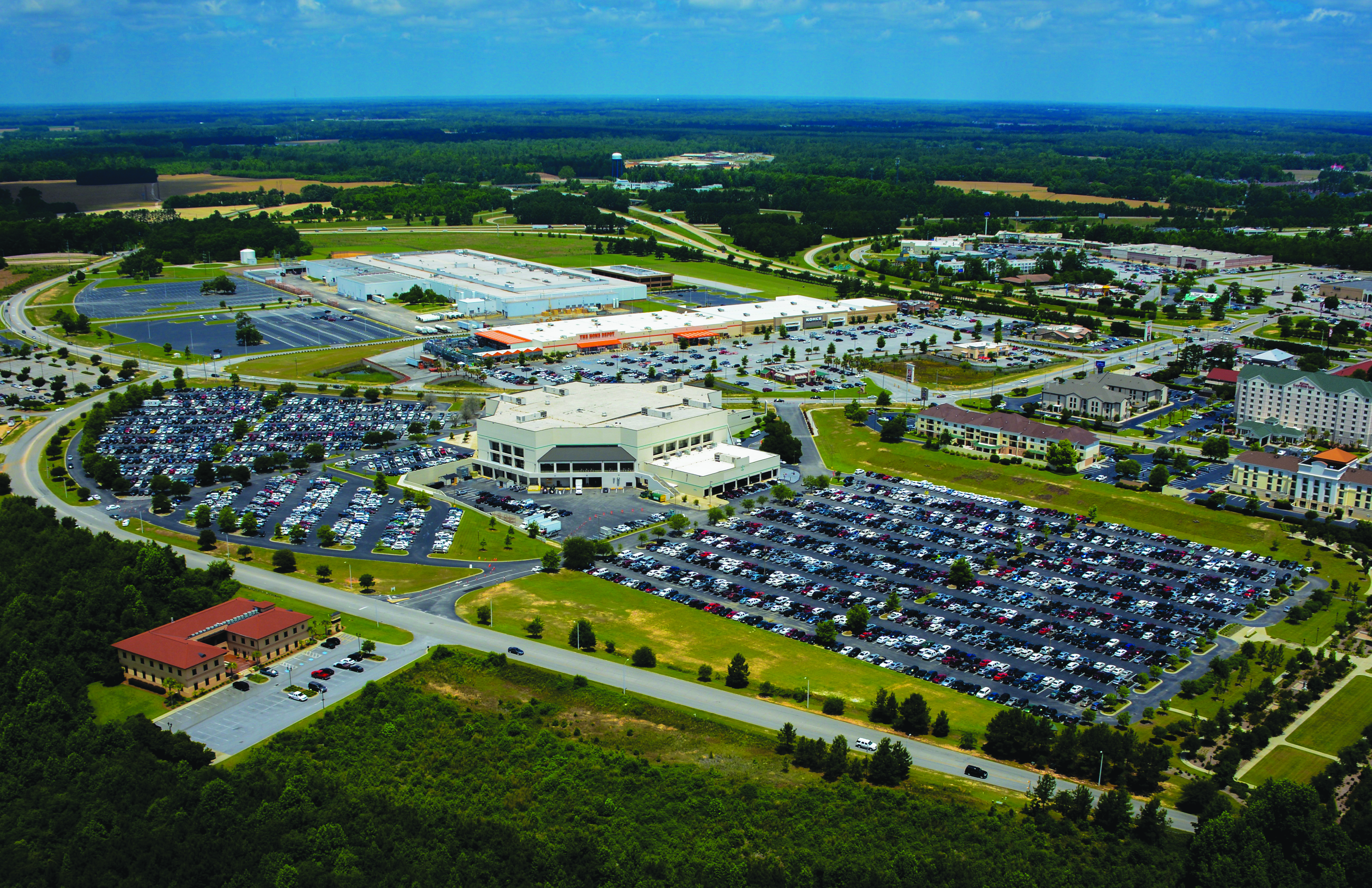
- Aerial View of the Florence Center
Interactive Map of Florence, SC MSA
City of Florence
Florence, SC MSA
- Country: United States
- State: South Carolina
- Largest city: Florence
- Other city: Darlington
- Time zone: UTC−5 (EST)
  - Summer (DST): UTC−4 (EDT)

As defined by the U.S. Office of Management and Budget and used by the U.S. Census Bureau for statistical purposes only, the Florence metropolitan statistical area, is an area consisting of two counties in the Pee Dee region of northeastern South Carolina, anchored by the city of Florence. As of the 2000 census, the MSA had a population of 193,155 (though a July 1, 2009 estimate placed the population at 200,653).

== Counties ==
- Darlington
- Florence

== Communities ==
- Coward
- Darlington
- Florence (Principal city)
- Hartsville
- Johnsonville
- Lake City
- Lamar
- North Hartsville (census-designated place)
- Olanta
- Pamplico
- Quinby
- Scranton
- Society Hill
- Timmonsville

== Demographics ==
As of the census of 2000, there were 193,155 people, 72,940 households, and 52,245 families residing within the MSA. The racial makeup of the MSA was 58.07% White, 40.16% African American, 0.21% Native American, 0.53% Asian, 0.01% Pacific Islander, 0.39% from other races, and 0.62% from two or more races. Hispanic or Latino of any race were 1.06% of the population.

The median income for a household in the MSA was $33,116, and the median income for a family was $39,468. Males had a median income of $31,506 versus $21,452 for females. The per capita income for the MSA was $17,080.

== See also ==
- South Carolina census statistical areas
