= Kent Lee (admiral) =

United States admiral

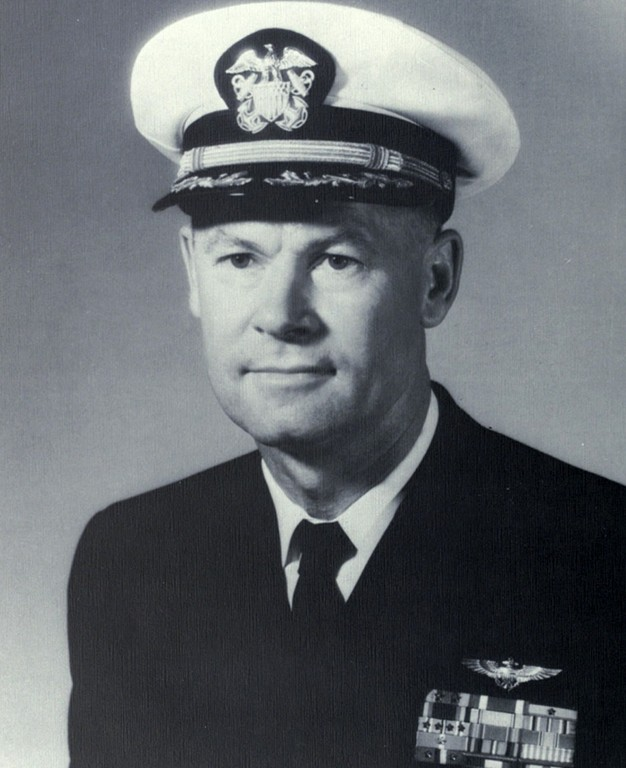
- VADM Lee while Commanding Officer of the U.S.S. Enterprise (CVN-65)
- Born: Kent Liston Lee; July 28, 1923; Florence County, South Carolina, U.S.
- Died: August 11, 2017 (aged 94); Charlottesville, Virginia, U.S.
- Military career
- Allegiance: United States of America
- Branch: United States Navy
- Service years: 1940–1976
- Rank: Vice Admiral
- Commands: Attack Squadron 46; Carrier Air Wing Six; USS Alamo (LSD-33); USS Enterprise (CVN-65); Task Unit 77.1; Naval Air Systems Command
- Conflicts: World War II; Korean War; Vietnam War
- Awards: Distinguished Service Medal; Legion of Merit (2); Air Medal (3)

Kent Liston Lee (July 28, 1923 – August 11, 2017) was a Vice Admiral of the United States Navy. The 36-year veteran of the Navy saw combat in World War II and the Korean War, and commanded the aircraft carrier Enterprise (CVN-65) during the Vietnam War. He is best known for his work in driving the development and procurement of the F/A-18 Hornet.

== Life and career ==
Lee was born to R. Irby and Hettie (Floyd) Lee in Florence County, South Carolina. He enlisted in the United States Navy on August 15, 1940. In 1942, he entered the flight training program, and was designated naval aviator and commissioned ensign on August 7, 1943. He served with Bomber Squadron 15 and Fighter Squadron 15 on the carrier Essex (CV-9). With Fighter Squadron 15, he shot down one Japanese aircraft.

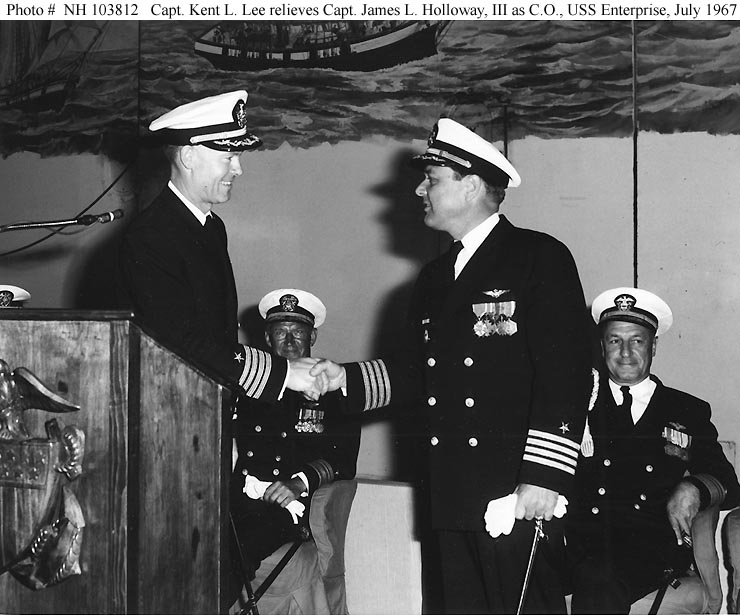
Capt. Kent Lee (left standing) taking command of the USS Enterprise.

After the war, the Navy sent him to Columbia University, where he studied mathematics and physics. During the Korean War, Lee served with Attack Squadron 115 flying from Philippine Sea (CV-47). In 1954, he received a master's degree in physics from the post-graduate Naval Academy. His command assignments included Attack Squadron 46, Carrier Air Wing Six, Alamo (LSD-33), and Enterprise (CVN-65).

His staff command posts included director of the Office of Program Appraisal, deputy director of the Joint Strategic Target Planning Staff, and commander, Naval Air Systems Command. There he was instrumental in the development and acquisition of the F/A-18 Hornet fighter aircraft. Lee retired from that billet on October 31, 1976.

Lee retired in Charlottesville, Virginia. He and his wife, Mary Edith "Mimi" (Buckley) Lee (July 2, 1924 – March 3, 2019), were married for 69 years and had three daughters and nine grandchildren. Kent Lee died in August 2017 at the age of 94. Lee and his wife are buried in Arlington National Cemetery.
