= Florence County, South Carolina =

County in South Carolina, United States

- County
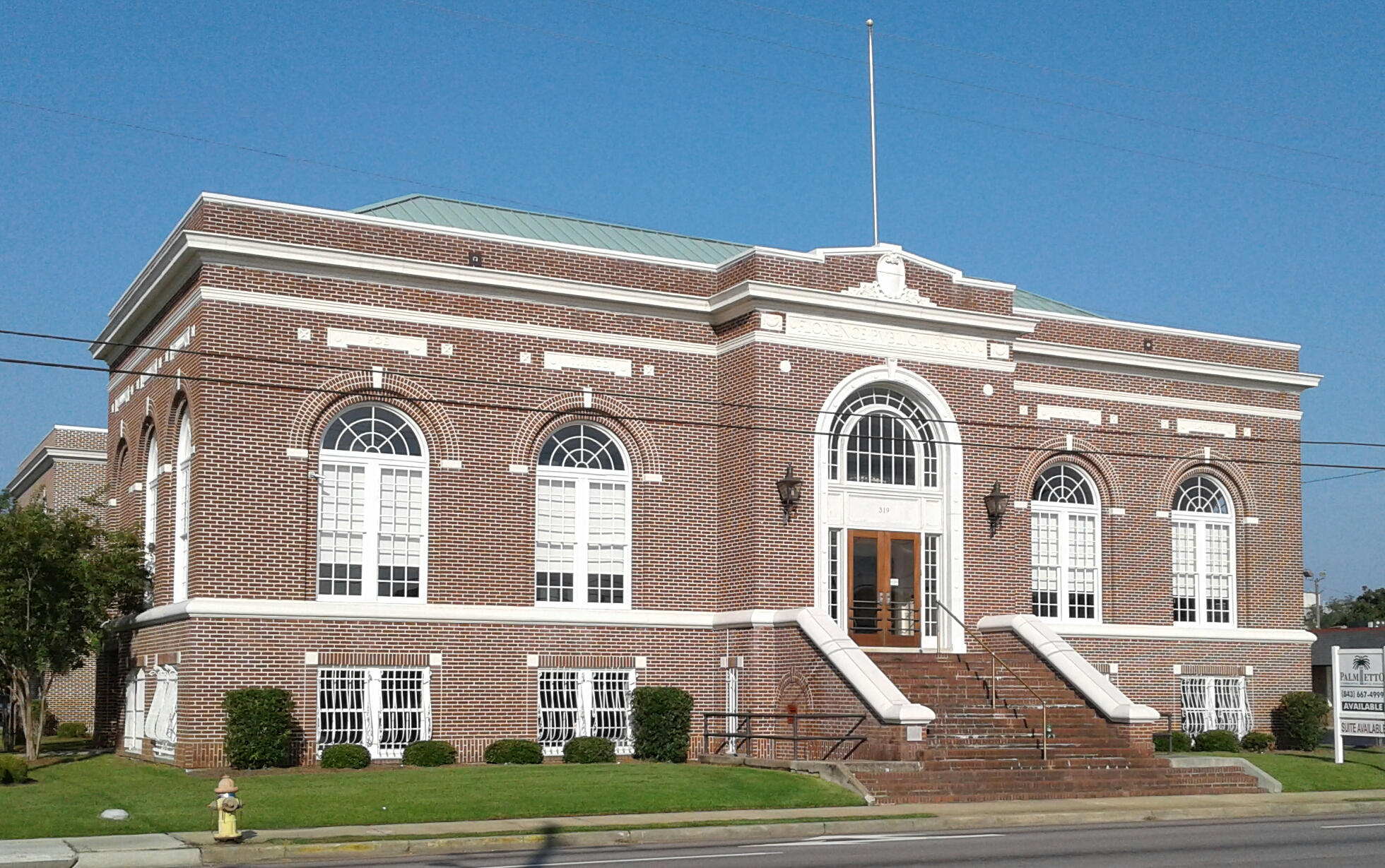
- Florence Public Library

- Flag Seal

- Location within the U.S. state of South Carolina
- Interactive map of Florence County, South Carolina
- Coordinates: 34.03°N 79.71°W
- Country: United States
- State: South Carolina
- Founded: 1888
- Named for: Florence Harllee
- Seat: Florence
- Largest community: Florence

Area
  - Total: 804.28 sq mi (2,083.1 km^{2})
  - Land: 800.51 sq mi (2,073.3 km^{2})
  - Water: 3.77 sq mi (9.8 km^{2}) 0.47%

Population (2020)
  - Total: 137,059
  - Estimate (2025): 138,504 ▲
  - Density: 171.21/sq mi (66.106/km^{2})
- Time zone: UTC−5 (Eastern)
  - Summer (DST): UTC−4 (EDT)
- Congressional districts: 6th, 7th
- Website: www.florencecountysc.gov

Florence County is a county located in the U.S. state of South Carolina. As of the 2020 census, its population was 137,059. Its county seat is Florence. Florence County is included in the Florence, South Carolina metropolitan area.

== History ==
Florence County was formed from main sections of Darlington and Marion Counties, plus other townships from Williamsburg and Clarendon Counties, starting in 1888. The last section of Williamsburg County was not added until 1921. Florence County was named after its county seat, Florence, which its founder, General William Harllee, in turn, named for his daughter, Florence. On December 26, 1921, Black American male Bill McAllister was lynched for having an affair with a White woman.

== Geography ==
According to the U.S. Census Bureau, the county has a total area of 804.28 square miles (2,083.1 km^{2}), of which 3.77 square miles (9.8 km^{2}) (0.47%) are covered by water.

=== State and local protected areas ===
- Lynches River County Park
- Moore Farms Botanical Garden (part)
- Pee Dee Station Site Wildlife Management Area
- Woods Bay State Park (part)

=== Major water bodies ===
- (Great) Pee Dee River
- Lynches River

=== Adjacent counties ===
- Marlboro County – north
- Dillon County – northeast
- Marion County – east
- Williamsburg County – south
- Clarendon County – southwest
- Sumter County – west
- Lee County – west
- Darlington County – northwest

=== Major highways ===
- I-20
- I-20 BS
- I-95
- US 52
- US 52 Truck
- US 52 Conn.
- US 76
- US 76 Conn.
- US 301
- US 301 Truck (truck route)
- US 378
- US 378 Bus.
- SC 41
- SC 46
- SC 51
- SC 51 Conn.
- SC 57
- SC 327
- SC 341
- SC 403
- SC 541
- SC 575

=== Major infrastructure ===
- Florence Regional Airport
- Florence Station

== Demographics ==
Historical population
Census	Pop.	Note	%±
1890	25,027		—
1900	28,474		13.8%
1910	35,671		25.3%
1920	50,406		41.3%
1930	61,027		21.1%
1940	70,582		15.7%
1950	79,710		12.9%
1960	84,438		5.9%
1970	89,636		6.2%
1980	110,163		22.9%
1990	114,344		3.8%
2000	125,761		10.0%
2010	136,885		8.8%
2020	137,059		0.1%
2025 (est.)	138,504	▲	1.1%
U.S. Decennial Census; 1790–1960 1900–1990; 1990–2000 2010 2020

=== Racial and ethnic composition ===
Florence County, South Carolina – Racial and ethnic composition Note: the US Census treats Hispanic/Latino as an ethnic category. This table excludes Latinos from the racial categories and assigns them to a separate category. Hispanics/Latinos may be of any race.
Race / Ethnicity (NH = Non-Hispanic)	Pop 1980	Pop 1990	Pop 2000	Pop 2010	Pop 2020	% 1980	% 1990	% 2000	% 2010	% 2020
White alone (NH)	68,176	69,252	73,216	74,105	69,021	61.89%	60.56%	58.22%	54.14%	50.36%
Black or African American alone (NH)	40,793	44,136	49,224	56,204	56,877	37.03%	38.60%	39.14%	41.06%	41.50%
Native American or Alaska Native alone (NH)	97	141	263	424	330	0.09%	0.12%	0.21%	0.31%	0.24%
Asian alone (NH)	139	280	870	1,660	2,309	0.13%	0.24%	0.69%	1.21%	1.68%
Native Hawaiian or Pacific Islander alone (NH)	x	x	20	23	48	x	x	0.02%	0.02%	0.04%
Other race alone (NH)	94	27	41	121	364	0.09%	0.02%	0.03%	0.09%	0.27%
Mixed race or Multiracial (NH)	x	x	744	1,318	3,827	x	x	0.59%	0.96%	2.79%
Hispanic or Latino (any race)	864	508	1,383	3,030	4,283	0.78%	0.44%	1.10%	2.21%	3.12%
Total	110,163	114,344	125,761	136,885	137,059	100.00%	100.00%	100.00%	100.00%	100.00%

=== 2020 census ===
As of the 2020 census, the county had 137,059 people living in 54,627 households and 35,763 families.

The median age was 40.5 years; 22.9% of residents were under the age of 18 and 18.6% of residents were 65 years of age or older. For every 100 females there were 87.7 males, and for every 100 females age 18 and over there were 83.9 males age 18 and over.

The racial makeup of the county was 50.9% White, 41.7% Black or African American, 0.3% American Indian and Alaska Native, 1.7% Asian, 0.0% Native Hawaiian and Pacific Islander, 1.5% from some other race, and 3.8% from two or more races; Hispanic or Latino residents of any race comprised 3.1% of the population.

According to the 2020 Decennial Census Detailed Housing Characteristics data, 60.8% of residents lived in urban areas while 39.2% lived in rural areas.

There were 54,627 households in the county, of which 31.2% had children under the age of 18 living with them and 35.5% had a female householder with no spouse or partner present. About 29.4% of all households were made up of individuals and 12.6% had someone living alone who was 65 years of age or older. There were 60,594 housing units, of which 9.8% were vacant; of the occupied units, 65.7% were owner-occupied and 34.3% were renter-occupied, with a homeowner vacancy rate of 1.5% and a rental vacancy rate of 8.2%.

=== 2010 census ===
At the 2010 census, 136,885 people, 52,653 households, and 36,328 families were living in the county. The population density was 171.1 inhabitants per square mile (66.1 inhabitants/km^{2}). The 58,666 housing units had an average density of 73.3 units per square mile (28.3 units/km^{2}). The racial makeup of the county was 54.9% White, 41.3% Black or African American, 1.2% Asian, 0.3% American Indian, 1.1% from other races, and 1.1% from two or more races. Those of Hispanic or Latino origin made up 2.2% of the population. In terms of ancestry, 8.4% were American, 7.8% were English, 6.7% were Irish, and 6.2% were German.

Of the 52,653 households, 35.2% had children under 18 living with them, 44.7% were married couples living together, 19.6% had a female householder with no husband present, 31.0% were not families, and 26.3% of households were made up of individuals. The average household size was 2.54 and the average family size was 3.06. The median age was 37.6 years.

The median household income was $40,487 and the median family income was $48,896. Males had a median income of $38,934 versus $30,163 for females. The per capita income for the county was $21,932. About 14.5% of families and 18.0% of the population were below the poverty line, including 26.1% of those under age 18 and 14.0% of those age 65 or over.

=== 2000 census ===
At the 2000 census, 125,761 people, 47,147 households, and 33,804 families lived in the county. The population density was 157 people per square mile (61 people/km^{2}). The 51,836 housing units had an average density of 65 units per square mile (25 units/km^{2}). The racial makeup of the county was 58.65% White, 39.34% Black or African American, 0.22% Native American, 0.70% Asian, 0.02% Pacific Islander, 0.39% from other races, and 0.68% from two or more races. 1.10% of the population were Hispanic or Latino of any race. Of the 47,147 households 33.8% had children under 18 living with them, 49.7% were married couples living together, 18.1% had a female householder with no husband present, and 28.3% were not families. About 24.5% of households were one person and 8.2% were one person 65 or older. The average household size was 2.59 and the average family size was 3.08.

The age distribution was 25.9% under 18, 9.7% from 18 to 24, 28.9% from 25 to 44, 23.6% from 45 to 64, and 11.80% 65 or older. The median age was 36 years. For every 100 females, there were 88.7 males. For every 100 females 18 and over, there were 84.2 males.

The median household income was $35,144 and the median family income was $41,274. Males had a median income of $32,065 versus $21,906 for females. The per capita income for the county was $17,876. About 13.50% of families and 16.4% of the population were below the poverty line, including 22.3% of those under 18 and 16.5% of those 65 or over.

According to the 2000 census, the population of Florence County was classified as 58% urban and 42% rural, containing the two urban areas of Florence (population 67,314) and Lake City (8,728). Along with Darlington County, it comprises part of the Florence metropolitan statistical area.

== Law and government ==
=== Law enforcement ===
In 2020, Florence County Sheriff Kenney Boone pled guilty to embezzlement and misconduct in office. He was not sentenced to jail time. As of 2021, the sheriff is T.J. Joye.

=== Politics ===
As part of the Solid South, Florence County was strongly Democratic throughout its early existence. In recent years, though, Florence has shifted to a Republican-leaning county, having not voted Democratic at the presidential level since Jimmy Carter in 1976. However, it has done so by relatively modest margins, as the county has been decided by a single-digit margin in every election since 2008. In 2020, incumbent Republican president Donald Trump narrowly carried Florence County, winning 32,615 votes (50.56%) to 31,153 (48.29%) for Democratic candidate Joe Biden. Typically, Democratic strength is concentrated in the City of Florence, while the suburban and rural areas lean strongly Republican.

Most of the county is located within the state's 7th congressional district, which is represented by Republican Russell Fry. A small portion of the county, specifically the areas around Lake City, is located in the majority-minority 6th district, and is represented by Democrat Jim Clyburn.

United States presidential election results for Florence County, South Carolina
Year	Republican		Democratic		Third party(ies)	
Year	No.	%	No.	%	No.	%
1892	293	15.40%	1,609	84.60%	0	0.00%
1896	136	8.00%	1,530	89.95%	35	2.06%
1900	74	5.43%	1,290	94.57%	0	0.00%
1904	31	2.07%	1,466	97.93%	0	0.00%
1908	28	1.87%	1,460	97.46%	10	0.67%
1912	6	0.38%	1,496	95.10%	71	4.51%
1916	26	1.34%	1,912	98.66%	0	0.00%
1920	79	4.29%	1,763	95.71%	0	0.00%
1924	32	2.46%	1,217	93.54%	52	4.00%
1928	93	5.27%	1,672	94.73%	0	0.00%
1932	29	0.90%	3,195	99.04%	2	0.06%
1936	25	0.59%	4,194	99.41%	0	0.00%
1940	95	3.53%	2,597	96.47%	0	0.00%
1944	128	3.99%	2,822	87.86%	262	8.16%
1948	192	3.76%	1,189	23.27%	3,729	72.97%
1952	5,236	49.51%	5,340	50.49%	0	0.00%
1956	1,855	19.00%	3,463	35.46%	4,447	45.54%
1960	5,815	48.84%	6,090	51.15%	1	0.01%
1964	10,346	59.11%	7,157	40.89%	0	0.00%
1968	8,917	36.19%	8,079	32.79%	7,642	31.02%
1972	18,106	65.30%	9,455	34.10%	165	0.60%
1976	13,539	45.27%	16,294	54.49%	71	0.24%
1980	17,069	50.19%	16,391	48.19%	551	1.62%
1984	22,753	60.51%	14,639	38.93%	208	0.55%
1988	19,490	60.50%	12,531	38.90%	193	0.60%
1992	19,802	50.77%	15,569	39.92%	3,632	9.31%
1996	18,490	51.26%	15,804	43.81%	1,776	4.92%
2000	23,678	57.14%	17,157	41.41%	602	1.45%
2004	27,689	55.89%	21,442	43.28%	414	0.84%
2008	29,861	51.16%	28,012	47.99%	500	0.86%
2012	28,961	49.83%	28,614	49.23%	547	0.94%
2016	29,573	51.05%	26,710	46.11%	1,648	2.84%
2020	32,615	50.56%	31,153	48.29%	742	1.15%
2024	32,615	53.34%	27,706	45.32%	819	1.34%

== Economy ==
In 2022, the GDP of Florence County was $8.5 billion (about $62,154 per capita). The real GDP was $7.2 billion (about $52,808 per capita) in chained 2017 dollars. In 2022-2024, the unemployment rate has fluctuated between 2.3-3.8%.

Duke Energy, Francis Marion University, GE HealthCare, Honda, McLeod Health, Otis Worldwide, QVC, Ruiz Foods, and Walmart are some of the largest employers in the county.

Employment and Wage Statistics by Industry in Florence County, South Carolina
Industry	Employment count	Employment (%)	Average annual wage ($)
Accommodation and Food Services	7,326	11.1	20,124
Administrative and Support and Waste Management and Remediation Services	4,207	6.4	34,632
Agriculture, Forestry, Fishing, and Hunting	191	0.3	49,036
Arts, Entertainment, and Recreation	661	1.0	27,768
Construction	1,800	2.7	63,024
Educational Services	4,188	6.3	48,360
Finance and Insurance	1,584	2.4	88,192
Health Care and Social Assistance	15,179	22.9	59,124
Information	569	0.9	69,732
Manufacturing	7,301	11.0	64,896
Mining, Quarrying, and Oil and Gas Extraction	34	0.1	43,420
Other Services (except Public Administration)	1,599	2.4	39,364
Professional, Scientific, and Technical Services	2,217	3.4	78,000
Public Administration	3,165	4.8	50,336
Real Estate and Rental and Leasing	844	1.3	51,636
Retail Trade	8,811	13.3	33,592
Transportation and Warehousing	3,572	5.4	46,436
Utilities	183	0.3	90,064
Wholesale Trade	2,713	4.1	65,416
Total	66,144	100.0%	49,641

== Communities ==
=== Cities ===
- Florence (county seat and largest community)
- Johnsonville
- Lake City

=== Towns ===
- Coward
- Olanta
- Pamplico
- Quinby
- Scranton
- Timmonsville

=== Census-designated places ===
- Danwood

=== Other unincorporated communities ===
- Cartersville
- Effingham
- Evergreen
- Hannah
- Kingsburg
- Mars Bluff
- Poston

== Notable people ==
- Donald Henry Gaskins (1933–1991), serial killer
- Roger K. Kirby (born 1960), politician
- Kent Lee (1923–2017), US Navy admiral
- Georganna Sinkfield (born 1943), politician

== See also ==
- List of counties in South Carolina
- National Register of Historic Places listings in Florence County, South Carolina
- Chaloklowa Chickasaw, state-recognized group that resides in the county

== Work cited ==
- "In Florence County: Killing of Negro Did Not Occur in Williamsburg". The County Record. Kingstree, Williamsburg, South Carolina. January 12, 1922. pp. 1–8. ISSN 2471-0350. OCLC 28401988.
