= Lake City, South Carolina =

City in South Carolina, United States

- City
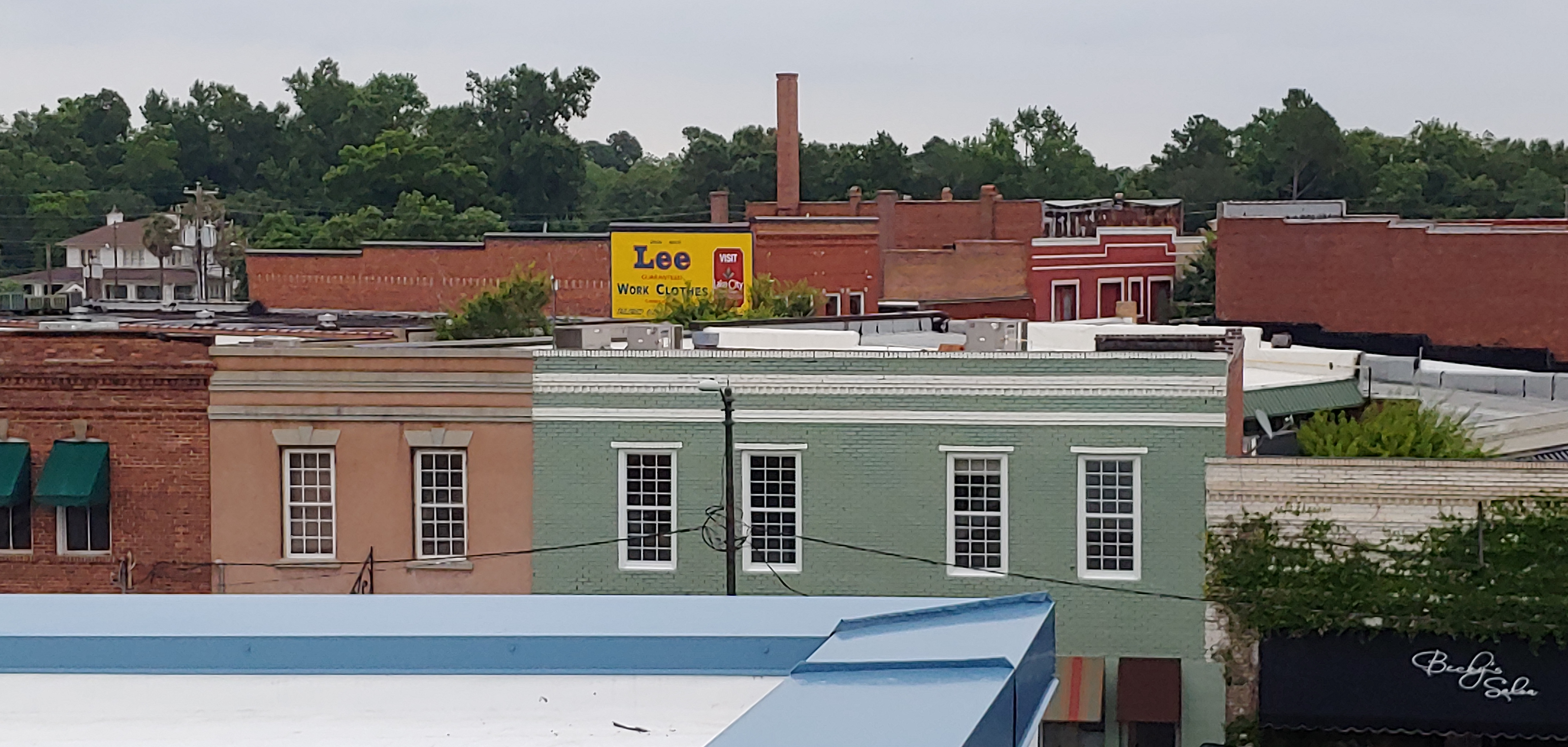
- Historic Downtown Lake City in 2018

- Seal Logo
- Motto(s): "Harvesting our past, cultivating our future"
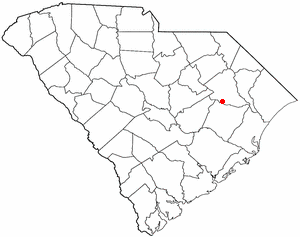
- Location of Lake City in South Carolina
- Coordinates: 33°52′24″N 79°45′12″W
- Country: United States
- State: South Carolina
- County: Florence
- Settled: 1736

Government
  - Mayor: Yamekia Robinson.
  - City Administrator: Malik Whitaker

Area
  - Total: 5.46 sq mi (14.13 km^{2})
  - Land: 5.45 sq mi (14.11 km^{2})
  - Water: 0.0077 sq mi (0.02 km^{2})
- Elevation: 75 ft (23 m)

Population (2020)
  - Total: 5,903
  - Density: 1,083.4/sq mi (418.31/km^{2})
- Time zone: UTC-5 (EST)
  - Summer (DST): UTC-4 (EDT)
- ZIP code: 29560
- Area codes: 843, 854
- FIPS code: 45-39310
- GNIS feature ID: 2404861
- Website: lakecitysc.gov

Lake City is a city in Florence County, South Carolina, United States. As of the 2020 census, Lake City had a population of 5,903. Located in central South Carolina, it is south of Florence and included as part of the Florence Metropolitan Statistical Area.

== History ==
The Lake City area was originally part of Williamsburg Township, which was first settled by a group of Scots-Irish in 1736. It was first called "Graham's Crossroads" and then "Graham", after Aaron Graham, a land owner around the crossroads that now form Church and Main streets in Lake City.

In 1856, the Northeastern Railroad built its main line through the area. This brought new growth to the community. On March 4, 1874, after requests from residents, a city charter was granted to the new town of Graham. On December 24, 1883, the town changed its name to "Lake City", after the swimming lakes just north of town. This was at the request of the locally-serving Lynches Lake Post Office, since there was another post office in South Carolina known as that.

This small town had a population of 300 in 1893, and by 1898 the area had become the leading strawberry cropland in South Carolina.

Lake City was the site of a notorious lynching on February 22, 1898, that resulted in the mob murders of the city's African-American postmaster and his infant daughter.

Lake City was at one time called the "Bean Capital of the World", and the Bean Market downtown has now been converted into an event rental and civic center facility. The building was built in 1936 by the Public Works Administration (PWA), and was a central hub for farmers across the South to get their beans to market. The building is listed in the National Register of Historic Places as a contributing property in the Lake City Downtown Historic District. Also listed on the National Register of Historical Places is the W.T. Askins House. The ArtFields festival is held in Lake City.

== Government ==
Lake City's city government includes a mayor (elected for a four-year term), an appointed city administrator, and a six-person city council (elected to single-member districts for a four-year staggered term of office). The city's mayor is Yamekia Robinson.

== Geography ==
Lake City is located in southern Florence County. U.S. Route 52 is the main highway through the city, leading north 24 miles (39 km) to Florence, the county seat, and south 17 miles (27 km) to Kingstree. U.S. Route 378 crosses US 52 1.5 miles (2.4 km) north of the city center, leading east 45 miles (72 km) to Conway and west 35 miles (56 km) to Sumter.

According to the United States Census Bureau, Lake City has a total area of 5.2 square miles (13.5 km^{2}), of which 0.01 square miles (0.02 km^{2}), or 0.15%, is water. Lake Swamp drains the northern part of the city, flowing east to the Lynches River and then the Pee Dee River.

=== Climate ===
Lake City has a humid subtropical climate (Köppen: Cfa) with long, hot summers and short, mild winters.

Climate data for Lake City, South Carolina (1991–2020 normals, extremes 1936–present)
Month	Jan	Feb	Mar	Apr	May	Jun	Jul	Aug	Sep	Oct	Nov	Dec	Year
Record high °F (°C)	81 (27)	85 (29)	92 (33)	94 (34)	102 (39)	106 (41)	105 (41)	106 (41)	103 (39)	101 (38)	89 (32)	83 (28)	106 (41)
Mean maximum °F (°C)	75.1 (23.9)	77.2 (25.1)	83.4 (28.6)	87.6 (30.9)	93.4 (34.1)	97.0 (36.1)	98.3 (36.8)	97.8 (36.6)	93.3 (34.1)	87.9 (31.1)	81.8 (27.7)	75.4 (24.1)	99.6 (37.6)
Mean daily maximum °F (°C)	57.6 (14.2)	61.3 (16.3)	68.0 (20.0)	77.1 (25.1)	83.4 (28.6)	89.4 (31.9)	92.4 (33.6)	90.5 (32.5)	85.9 (29.9)	77.3 (25.2)	68.1 (20.1)	60.6 (15.9)	76.0 (24.4)
Daily mean °F (°C)	46.0 (7.8)	49.2 (9.6)	55.3 (12.9)	63.6 (17.6)	71.4 (21.9)	78.4 (25.8)	81.8 (27.7)	80.4 (26.9)	75.3 (24.1)	65.1 (18.4)	55.1 (12.8)	48.8 (9.3)	64.2 (17.9)
Mean daily minimum °F (°C)	34.3 (1.3)	37.0 (2.8)	42.6 (5.9)	50.1 (10.1)	59.4 (15.2)	67.3 (19.6)	71.3 (21.8)	70.3 (21.3)	64.6 (18.1)	52.9 (11.6)	42.2 (5.7)	36.9 (2.7)	52.4 (11.3)
Mean minimum °F (°C)	18.7 (−7.4)	23.4 (−4.8)	27.2 (−2.7)	36.0 (2.2)	46.5 (8.1)	58.7 (14.8)	64.6 (18.1)	62.3 (16.8)	53.4 (11.9)	37.2 (2.9)	26.9 (−2.8)	23.3 (−4.8)	16.6 (−8.6)
Record low °F (°C)	2 (−17)	5 (−15)	10 (−12)	26 (−3)	35 (2)	46 (8)	53 (12)	53 (12)	42 (6)	26 (−3)	17 (−8)	6 (−14)	2 (−17)
Average precipitation inches (mm)	3.65 (93)	3.48 (88)	3.60 (91)	3.19 (81)	4.20 (107)	4.84 (123)	5.77 (147)	5.81 (148)	4.74 (120)	3.52 (89)	3.13 (80)	3.85 (98)	49.78 (1,264)
Average precipitation days (≥ 0.01 in)	6.6	6.3	5.8	5.5	5.4	7.7	7.4	7.9	6.3	4.5	4.9	6.7	75.0
Source: NOAA

== Demographics ==
Historical population
Census	Pop.	Note	%±
1900	374		—
1910	1,074		187.2%
1920	1,606		49.5%
1930	1,942		20.9%
1940	2,522		29.9%
1950	5,112		102.7%
1960	6,059		18.5%
1970	6,247		3.1%
1980	6,731		7.7%
1990	7,153		6.3%
2000	6,478		−9.4%
2010	6,675		3.0%
2020	5,903		−11.6%
U.S. Decennial Census

=== 2020 census ===
As of the 2020 census, there were 5,903 people, 2,393 households, and 1,568 families residing in the city.

The median age was 38.9 years; 26.5% of residents were under the age of 18 and 18.4% of residents were 65 years of age or older. For every 100 females there were 79.4 males, and for every 100 females age 18 and over there were 71.7 males.

93.1% of residents lived in urban areas, while 6.9% lived in rural areas.

Of the 2,393 households in Lake City, 33.8% had children under the age of 18 living in them. Of all households, 23.9% were married-couple households, 19.3% were households with a male householder and no spouse or partner present, and 51.2% were households with a female householder and no spouse or partner present. About 32.0% of all households were made up of individuals and 15.0% had someone living alone who was 65 years of age or older. There were 2,726 housing units, of which 12.2% were vacant. The homeowner vacancy rate was 2.4% and the rental vacancy rate was 7.9%.

Racial composition as of the 2020 census
Race	Number	Percent
White	954	16.2%
Black or African American	4,658	78.9%
American Indian and Alaska Native	29	0.5%
Asian	28	0.5%
Native Hawaiian and Other Pacific Islander	1	0.0%
Some other race	71	1.2%
Two or more races	162	2.7%
Hispanic or Latino (of any race)	132	2.2%

=== 2000 census ===
As of the census of 2000, there were 6,478 people, 2,409 households, and 1,705 families residing in the city. The population density was 1,365.0 inhabitants per square mile (527.0/km^{2}). There were 2,704 housing units at an average density of 569.8 per square mile (220.0/km^{2}). The racial makeup of the city was 71.43% African American, 27.18% White, 0.08% Native American, 0.34% Asian, 0.28% from other races, and 0.69% from two or more races. Hispanic or Latino of any race were 1.10% of the population.

There were 2,409 households, out of which 33.3% had children under the age of 18 living with them, 36.6% were married couples living together, 30.5% had a female householder with no husband present, and 29.2% were non-families. 26.7% of all households were made up of individuals, and 11.2% had someone living alone who was 65 years of age or older. The average household size was 2.67 and the average family size was 3.25.

In the city, the population was spread out, with 29.7% under the age of 18, 9.5% from 18 to 24, 25.8% from 25 to 44, 21.5% from 45 to 64, and 13.5% who were 65 years of age or older. The median age was 34 years. For every 100 females, there were 79.7 males. For every 100 females age 18 and over, there were 71.4 males.

The median income for a household in the city was $22,534, and the median income for a family was $32,111. Males had a median income of $26,316 versus $19,679 for females. The per capita income for the city was $14,452. About 26.9% of families and 31.6% of the population were below the poverty line, including 45.0% of those under age 18 and 25.3% of those age 65 or over.

== Education ==
Lake City has a public library, a branch of the Florence County Library System.

The town has five schools; three public schools (Lake City Early College-High School, Lake City Early Childhood Center of the Arts and Main Street Elementary School of Arts) and two private schools (Carolina Academy and the J. Paul Truluck Creative Arts and Science Magnet School). The town previously had another public school: J. Paul Truluck High School.

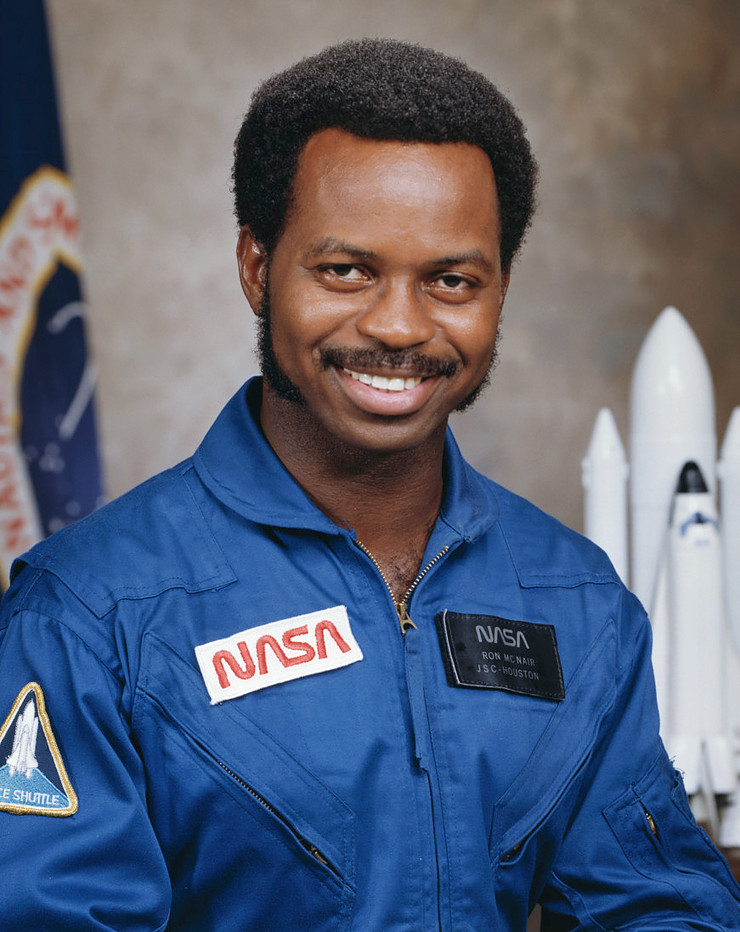
Astronaut Ronald McNair. Lake City has several sites named in McNair’s honor, including a public library and memorial park.

== Notable people ==
- Derrick Burgess (b. 1978), NFL player with the Oakland Raiders
- Brad J. Cox (1944–2021), co-creator of the programming language Object-C, which became the basis for languages used to build Mac OS and iOS (obituary)
- D. T. Cromer (David Thomas Cromer, b. 1971 in Lake City), Major League Baseball player
- Tripp Cromer (Roy Bunyan Cromer, b. 1967 in Lake City), Major League Baseball player
- Aubrey Daniels (1935-2025), American behavioral scientist and the founder of Aubrey Daniels International (ADI)
- Derrick Faison (1967–2004), professional football player for the Los Angeles Rams;
- Ronald McNair (1950–1986), graduate of North Carolina A&T State University, one of the astronauts killed during the launch of the space shuttle Challenger mission STS-51-L
- Darla Moore (b. 1954), investor and philanthropist
- Rob Thomas (b. 1972), lead singer of Matchbox Twenty, lived with his grandmother in Lake City during his early youth
