= National Register of Historic Places listings in Clarendon County, South Carolina =

Location of Clarendon County in South Carolina

This is a list of the National Register of Historic Places listings in Clarendon County, South Carolina.

This is intended to be a complete list of the properties on the National Register of Historic Places in Clarendon County, South Carolina, United States. The locations of National Register properties for which the latitude and longitude coordinates are included below, may be seen in a map.

There are 11 properties listed on the National Register in the county.

This National Park Service list is complete through NPS recent listings posted August 28, 2026.

== Current listings ==
	Name on the Register	Image	Date listed	Location	City or town	Description
1	Alderman's 20 Stores in One	Alderman's 20 Stores in One	August 26, 1994 (#94001047)	34 and 36 Brooks St. 33°41′14″N 80°12′38″W	Manning	
2	Clarendon County Health Center and Office Building		June 9, 2022 (#100007767)	3 South Church St. 33°41′40″N 80°12′33″W	Manning	
3	Davis House	Davis House	January 13, 1983 (#83002191)	South of Manning on South Carolina Highway 63; 33°39′09″N 80°13′33″W	Manning	
4	James Building	James Building	March 28, 2007 (#07000222)	124-126 Main St. 33°36′28″N 80°21′02″W	Summerton	
5	Manning Commercial Historic District	Manning Commercial Historic District	May 28, 2010 (#10000297)	Portions of E Boyce, W Boyce, N Brooks, S Brooks, W Keitt, N Mill, S. Mill, E Rigby, and W Rigby; 33°41′43″N 80°12′38″W	Manning	
6	Manning Library	Manning Library	July 10, 1979 (#79002381)	211 N. Brooks St. 33°41′59″N 80°12′38″W	Manning	
7	Pleasant Grove School	Pleasant Grove School	September 18, 2023 (#100009383)	1012 Joe and Marie Rd. 33°45′41″N 80°09′18″W	Alcolu	
8	Santee Indian Mound and Fort Watson	Santee Indian Mound and Fort Watson	July 29, 1969 (#69000164)	Address Restricted	Summerton	
9	Scott's Branch High School	Scott's Branch High School	May 24, 2023 (#100008990)	1102 4th St. 33°36′39″N 80°21′30″W	Summerton vicinity	
10	Senn's Grist Mill-Blacksmith Shop-Orange Crush Bottling Plant	Senn's Grist Mill-Blacksmith Shop-Orange Crush Bottling Plant	March 24, 2000 (#00000290)	3 Cantey St. 33°36′32″N 80°21′05″W	Summerton	
11	Summerton High School	Summerton High School	August 26, 1994 (#94001048)	S. Church St. 33°36′24″N 80°20′35″W	Summerton	

== See also ==
- List of National Historic Landmarks in South Carolina
- National Register of Historic Places listings in South Carolina
