= Climate of South Carolina =

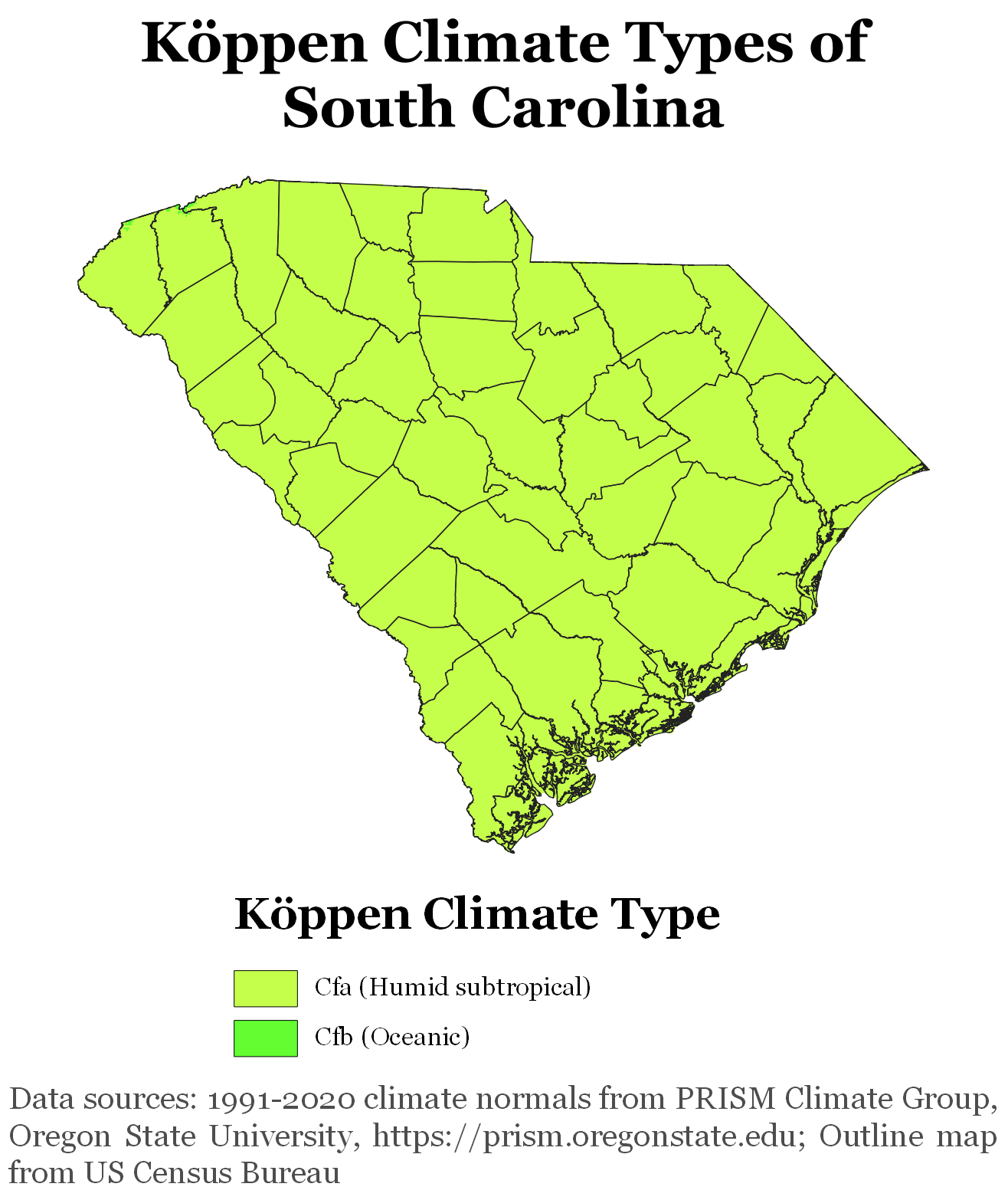
Köppen climate types of South Carolina, using 1991–2020 climate normals.

South Carolina has a humid subtropical climate, with hot summers throughout most of the state. But, an exception does occur in the Blue Ridge Mountains, as outlier pockets of an Oceanic Climate do exist. Mild winters predominate in the eastern and southern part of the state, but cool winters are the standard in the northwestern area of the state, especially areas at or above 600 feet in elevation. On average, between 40 and 80 inches (1,000 and 2,000 mm) of precipitation falls annually across the state, potentially even in excess of 100 inches in portions of the Appalachian temperate rainforest. Tropical cyclones, and afternoon thunderstorms due to hot and humid conditions, contribute to precipitation during the summer and sometimes fall months, while extratropical cyclones contribute to precipitation during the fall, winter, and spring months. The coast experiences nearly all of their tropical weather impacts from storms coming directly from the Atlantic coast. The northwestern area of the state can receive impacts from both Atlantic basin storms moving westward from the coast and also occasionally very heavy rainfall and flooding from storms originating from the Gulf of Mexico that move inland towards the northeast after making landfall from the Florida Panhandle to Louisiana.

Tornadoes happen mostly in the spring, with a secondary peak in November. Hail and damaging winds often occur in summertime thunderstorms. Tornadoes are very uncommon in the summer unless a tropical disturbance were to spawn one.

== Temperatures ==
The USDA Hardiness Zones for South Carolina range from Zone 7B (5°F to 10°F) in the extreme northwest portion of the state, to Zone 9B (25°F to 30°F) along the southeastern coast.

South Carolina has a humid subtropical climate (Köppen climate classification Cfa), although high elevation areas in the "Upstate" area have less tropical characteristics than areas on the Atlantic coastline. In the summer, South Carolina is hot and humid with temperatures during the day averaging near 90 °F (32 °C) across most of the state with overnight lows near 70 °F (21 °C). Winter temperatures are much less uniform. Coastal areas of the state have very mild (and sometimes warm) winters with high temperatures averaging about 60 °F (16 °C) and overnight lows close to 38 °F (3 °C). Further inland in the Piedmont, temperatures average between 50 °F (10 °C) during the day and 32 °F (0 °C) at night.

Event	Measurement	Date	Location	County
Highest temperature	113 °F (45.0 °C)	June 29, 2012	USC Columbia	Richland
Lowest temperature	−19 °F (−28.3 °C)	January 21, 1985	Caesars Head	Greenville

== Precipitation ==
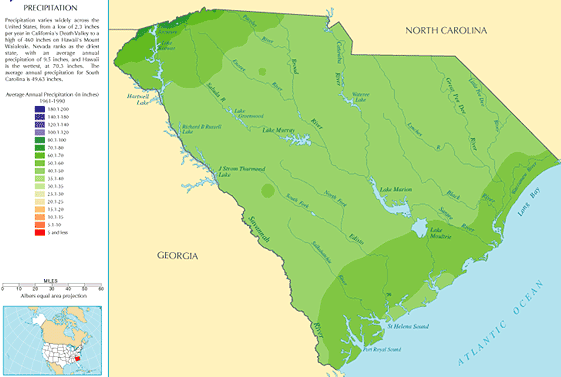
Annual average precipitation in South Carolina

While precipitation is abundant the entire year in almost the entire state, the coastline tends to have a slightly wetter summer, while inland March tends to be the wettest month. During the cold season, extratropical cyclones is the main cause of precipitation, while during the summer, tropical cyclones and thunderstorms forming due to afternoon heating are the main causes of precipitation. A lee side rain shadow from the Appalachian Mountains lowers annual precipitation across central portions of the state. Inland sections average 40 inches (1,000 mm) to 50 inches (1,300 mm) of rainfall, while near the coast 50 inches (1,300 mm) to 60 inches (1,500 mm), and the Piedmont receives 70 inches (1,800 mm) to 80 inches (2,000 mm) of precipitation. Winter precipitation is determined in large by the El Niño-Southern Oscillation. During El Niño events, the jet stream is further south and east across the U.S., thus leading to cooler and wetter winters in South Carolina, while La Niña keeps the jet stream further north and west causing warmer and drier winters.

Event	Measurement	Date	Location	County
Most precipitation in a year for a single area	123.45 inches (3,136 mm)	2018	Walhalla State Fish Hatchery	Oconee
Least precipitation in a year for a single area	22.69 inches (58 cm)	?		

Event	Measurement	Date	Location	County
Greatest 24-hour rainfall	14.80 inches (376 mm)	September 16, 1999	Myrtle Beach	Horry

=== Snowfall and ice ===
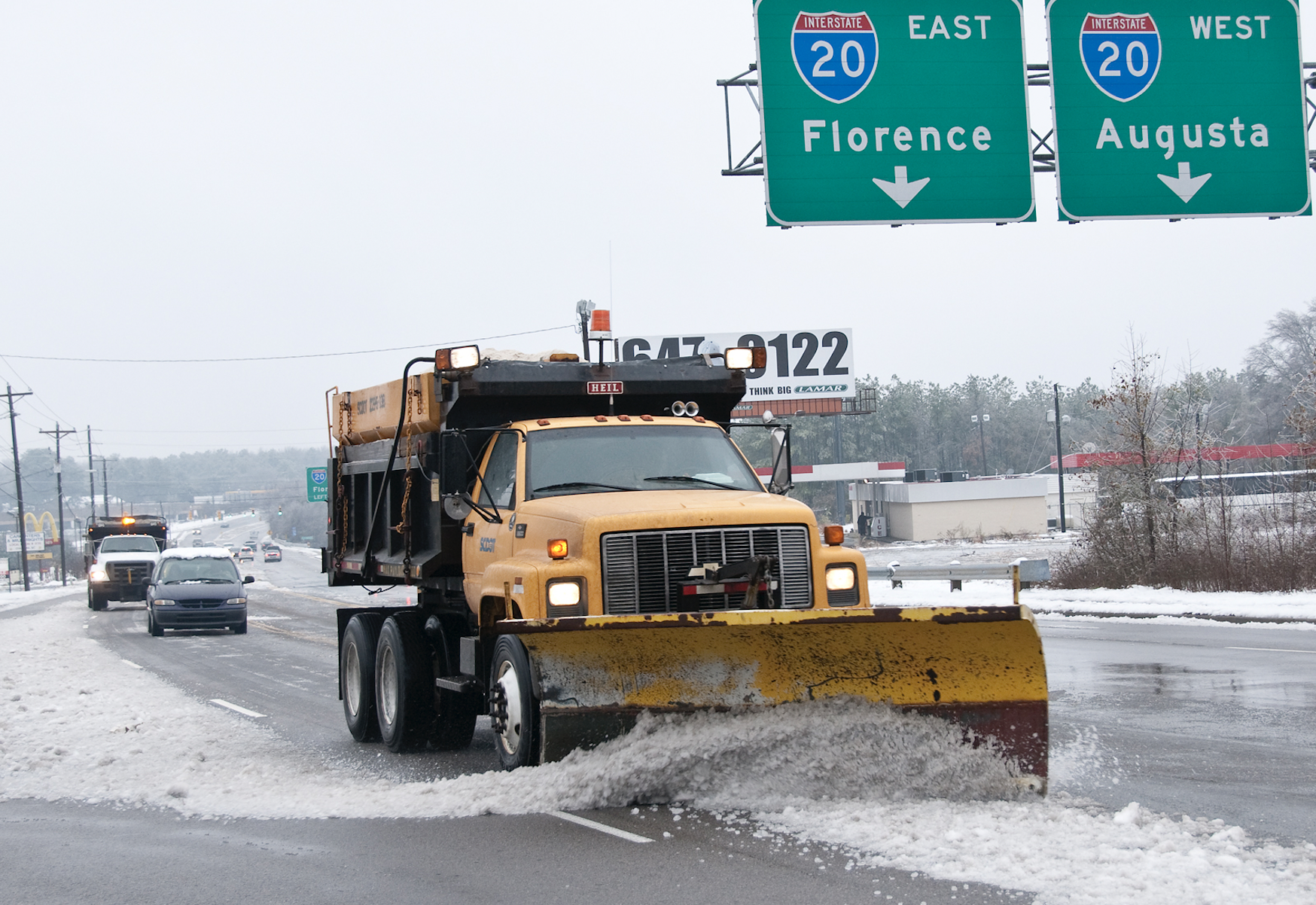
SCDOT Snow Plow in Columbia, February 2014

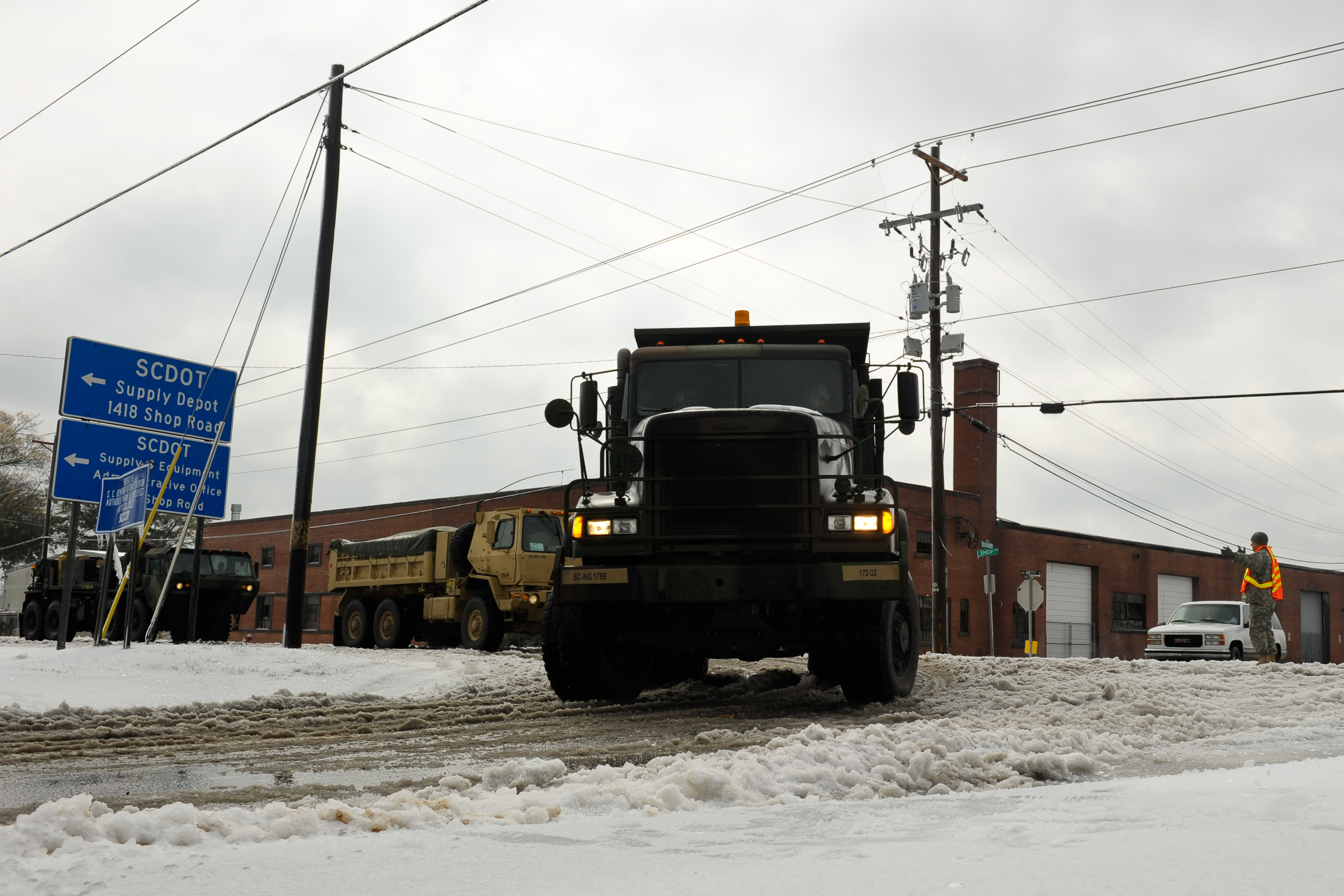
The SC Army National Guard assists in de-icing during Winter Storm Pax, 2014

Annual snowfall across South Carolina varies greatly in frequency and amounts, from being quite rare with little to no accumulation in the southern coastal areas to being very common annually with 2 to 3 small snowfall events in the Upstate, particularly along and north of Interstate 85, which essentially is built along the 260 to 270 meters (850 to 900 feet) elevation contour. In the southern coastal area near and below Charleston, several years might pass without any measurable snowfall. In the Greenville, Spartanburg, and Anderson areas, total annual amounts range from 5.1 to 12.7 centimetres (2 to 5 inches), with occasional annual totals reaching 20 centimetres or 8 inches+ (cumulatively). A year without at least one snow event in the Upstate is quite unusual. The Midlands is the least predictable area of the state in experiencing snowfall events. About 5 out of every 10 years, the region will have no snowfall at all; however in the 5 out of 10 years that the region receives snow, the accumulations are anywhere from under an inch to occasionally as much as 10 to 13 centimetres (4 to 5 inches). The snowiest location in the state, above 2,000 feet in elevation, averages 12 inches (30 cm) of snow a year in the Blue Ridge Escarpment area. Freezing rain is more common than snow around and southeast of Columbia. Along the southern coastal barrier islands, frozen precipitation of any type is very rare, with only a few snow events on record.

Event	Measurement	Date	Location	County
Greatest 24-hour snowfall	24 inches (61 cm)	February 10–11, 1973	Rimini	Clarendon
Most snowfall from one storm	28.9 inches (73 cm)	February 15–17, 1969	Caesars Head	Greenville

=== Tropical cyclones ===
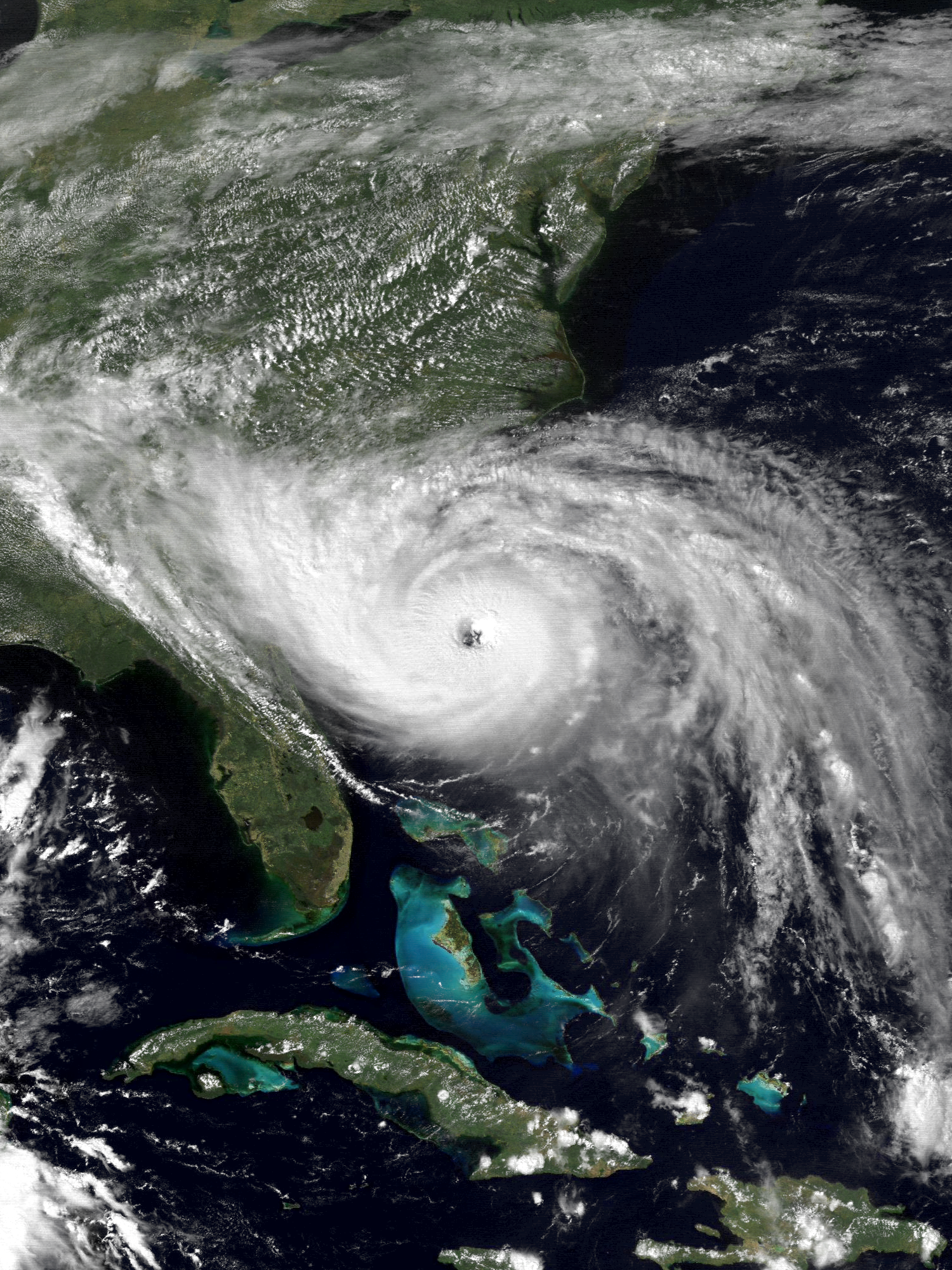
Hurricane Hugo approaching South Carolina on September 21, 1989

The state is prone to tropical cyclones. This is an annual concern during hurricane season, which is from June through November. The peak time of vulnerability for the southeast Atlantic coast is from early August to early October when tropical cyclone frequency is highest. Major hurricanes can impact the Palmetto state, though there are no category 5 impacts on record. Two of the stronger hurricanes to strike South Carolina in recent times are Hurricane Hazel (1954) and Hurricane Hugo (1989), which were of category 4 strength. For weaker systems, rainfall and spin-up tornadoes in the outer bands are the main impacts to the state. The wettest known tropical cyclone to impact South Carolina was a tropical depression named Jerry in 1995 which stalled nearby and had previously been a tropical storm across Florida. Jerry brought nearly 19 inches (480 mm) of rainfall to upstate South Carolina.

Event	Measurement	Date	Location	County
Wettest tropical cyclone	17.00 inches (432 mm)	Tropical Storm Jerry (1995)	Antreville	Abbeville

=== Thunderstorms and tornadoes ===
South Carolina averages around 64 days of thunderstorm activity per year. Most thunderstorms occur during the summer. South Carolina is vulnerable to tornadoes. Some notable tornadoes have struck South Carolina and the state averages around 14 tornadoes annually. There have been no F-5/EF-5 tornadoes on record but over a dozen F-4/EF-4 tornadoes have occurred in many counties in South Carolina.

== Monthly normals and extremes for select cities ==
Climate data for Greenville, South Carolina (Greenville–Spartanburg Int'l), 1991–2020 normals, (Note: Mean monthly maxima and minima (i.e. the expected highest and lowest temperature readings at any point during the year or given month) calculated based on data at said location from 1991 to 2020.) extremes 1884–present (Note: Official records for Greenville kept April 1884 to 10 December 1941 at downtown, 11 December 1941 to 14 October 1962 at Greenville Downtown Airport, and at Greenville–Spartanburg Int'l near Greer since 15 October 1962. For more information, see Threadex)
Month	Jan	Feb	Mar	Apr	May	Jun	Jul	Aug	Sep	Oct	Nov	Dec	Year
Record high °F (°C)	82 (28)	81 (27)	91 (33)	94 (34)	100 (38)	105 (41)	107 (42)	105 (41)	101 (38)	98 (37)	86 (30)	79 (26)	107 (42)
Mean maximum °F (°C)	70.3 (21.3)	73.2 (22.9)	81.2 (27.3)	85.8 (29.9)	90.6 (32.6)	95.1 (35.1)	97.3 (36.3)	95.9 (35.5)	92.1 (33.4)	85.1 (29.5)	77.0 (25.0)	70.6 (21.4)	98.3 (36.8)
Mean daily maximum °F (°C)	52.8 (11.6)	57.0 (13.9)	64.4 (18.0)	73.2 (22.9)	80.3 (26.8)	87.2 (30.7)	90.3 (32.4)	88.5 (31.4)	82.7 (28.2)	73.1 (22.8)	62.9 (17.2)	54.9 (12.7)	72.3 (22.4)
Daily mean °F (°C)	42.5 (5.8)	45.9 (7.7)	52.8 (11.6)	61.0 (16.1)	68.9 (20.5)	76.3 (24.6)	79.7 (26.5)	78.4 (25.8)	72.5 (22.5)	61.7 (16.5)	51.6 (10.9)	44.8 (7.1)	61.3 (16.3)
Mean daily minimum °F (°C)	32.1 (0.1)	34.8 (1.6)	41.2 (5.1)	48.7 (9.3)	57.5 (14.2)	65.5 (18.6)	69.2 (20.7)	68.3 (20.2)	62.4 (16.9)	50.4 (10.2)	40.4 (4.7)	34.8 (1.6)	50.4 (10.2)
Mean minimum °F (°C)	15.7 (−9.1)	20.3 (−6.5)	24.8 (−4.0)	33.5 (0.8)	43.7 (6.5)	56.3 (13.5)	63.0 (17.2)	61.6 (16.4)	50.6 (10.3)	35.1 (1.7)	26.1 (−3.3)	21.1 (−6.1)	13.7 (−10.2)
Record low °F (°C)	−6 (−21)	−5 (−21)	11 (−12)	22 (−6)	27 (−3)	40 (4)	53 (12)	50 (10)	32 (0)	25 (−4)	11 (−12)	3 (−16)	−6 (−21)
Average precipitation inches (mm)	4.12 (105)	3.84 (98)	4.48 (114)	4.04 (103)	4.07 (103)	3.90 (99)	4.82 (122)	4.66 (118)	3.73 (95)	3.59 (91)	3.84 (98)	4.58 (116)	49.67 (1,262)
Average snowfall inches (cm)	1.6 (4.1)	1.0 (2.5)	0.6 (1.5)	0.0 (0.0)	0.0 (0.0)	0.0 (0.0)	0.0 (0.0)	0.0 (0.0)	0.0 (0.0)	0.0 (0.0)	0.1 (0.25)	0.6 (1.5)	3.9 (9.9)
Average precipitation days (≥ 0.01 in)	10.4	9.4	10.2	9.7	9.7	10.8	12.0	11.1	8.0	7.1	8.5	10.0	116.9
Average snowy days (≥ 0.1 in)	1.1	0.7	0.3	0.0	0.0	0.0	0.0	0.0	0.0	0.0	0.1	0.4	2.6
Average relative humidity (%)	65.8	62.6	62.1	60.7	68.5	70.5	74.0	75.6	75.8	70.9	68.2	67.7	68.5
Mean monthly sunshine hours	176.6	182.7	236.2	264.7	269.2	270.8	267.8	253.9	229.2	235.2	184.3	169.4	2,740
Percentage possible sunshine	56	60	64	68	62	62	61	61	62	67	59	55	62
Source: NOAA (relative humidity 1962–1990, sun 1961–1990)

Climate data for Myrtle Beach (1991−2020 normals, extremes 1931–present)
Month	Jan	Feb	Mar	Apr	May	Jun	Jul	Aug	Sep	Oct	Nov	Dec	Year
Record high °F (°C)	81 (27)	86 (30)	88 (31)	92 (33)	99 (37)	104 (40)	101 (38)	104 (40)	99 (37)	93 (34)	86 (30)	84 (29)	104 (40)
Mean daily maximum °F (°C)	55.5 (13.1)	57.8 (14.3)	63.7 (17.6)	71.5 (21.9)	78.8 (26.0)	84.5 (29.2)	87.4 (30.8)	86.5 (30.3)	83.0 (28.3)	75.6 (24.2)	66.4 (19.1)	58.6 (14.8)	72.4 (22.4)
Daily mean °F (°C)	44.5 (6.9)	46.6 (8.1)	52.7 (11.5)	61.1 (16.2)	69.3 (20.7)	76.2 (24.6)	79.5 (26.4)	78.3 (25.7)	74.0 (23.3)	64.7 (18.2)	54.3 (12.4)	47.4 (8.6)	62.4 (16.9)
Mean daily minimum °F (°C)	33.6 (0.9)	35.5 (1.9)	41.8 (5.4)	50.6 (10.3)	59.7 (15.4)	67.9 (19.9)	71.6 (22.0)	70.0 (21.1)	65.0 (18.3)	53.8 (12.1)	42.2 (5.7)	36.3 (2.4)	52.3 (11.3)
Record low °F (°C)	10 (−12)	9 (−13)	18 (−8)	25 (−4)	36 (2)	48 (9)	54 (12)	54 (12)	43 (6)	25 (−4)	16 (−9)	10 (−12)	9 (−13)
Average precipitation inches (mm)	3.43 (87)	3.76 (96)	3.71 (94)	3.38 (86)	3.80 (97)	4.85 (123)	6.61 (168)	6.27 (159)	6.77 (172)	4.11 (104)	3.06 (78)	3.81 (97)	53.56 (1,360)
Source: NOAA

Climate data for Charleston Int'l, South Carolina (1991–2020 normals, extremes 1938–present)
Month	Jan	Feb	Mar	Apr	May	Jun	Jul	Aug	Sep	Oct	Nov	Dec	Year
Record high °F (°C)	83 (28)	87 (31)	90 (32)	95 (35)	101 (38)	103 (39)	104 (40)	105 (41)	99 (37)	94 (34)	88 (31)	83 (28)	105 (41)
Mean maximum °F (°C)	76.7 (24.8)	78.7 (25.9)	84.2 (29.0)	88.0 (31.1)	93.0 (33.9)	96.4 (35.8)	97.7 (36.5)	96.6 (35.9)	92.9 (33.8)	87.4 (30.8)	82.2 (27.9)	77.2 (25.1)	98.9 (37.2)
Mean daily maximum °F (°C)	60.2 (15.7)	63.8 (17.7)	70.1 (21.2)	77.1 (25.1)	83.6 (28.7)	88.5 (31.4)	91.3 (32.9)	89.8 (32.1)	85.4 (29.7)	77.9 (25.5)	69.4 (20.8)	62.7 (17.1)	76.6 (24.8)
Daily mean °F (°C)	49.5 (9.7)	52.7 (11.5)	58.7 (14.8)	65.8 (18.8)	73.3 (22.9)	79.4 (26.3)	82.5 (28.1)	81.4 (27.4)	76.9 (24.9)	67.8 (19.9)	58.3 (14.6)	52.2 (11.2)	66.5 (19.2)
Mean daily minimum °F (°C)	38.9 (3.8)	41.6 (5.3)	47.3 (8.5)	54.5 (12.5)	63.0 (17.2)	70.4 (21.3)	73.7 (23.2)	73.1 (22.8)	68.3 (20.2)	57.7 (14.3)	47.1 (8.4)	41.6 (5.3)	56.4 (13.6)
Mean minimum °F (°C)	22.0 (−5.6)	26.2 (−3.2)	30.8 (−0.7)	39.7 (4.3)	50.2 (10.1)	61.7 (16.5)	68.2 (20.1)	66.4 (19.1)	57.0 (13.9)	41.7 (5.4)	31.7 (−0.2)	26.0 (−3.3)	20.3 (−6.5)
Record low °F (°C)	6 (−14)	12 (−11)	15 (−9)	29 (−2)	36 (2)	50 (10)	58 (14)	56 (13)	42 (6)	27 (−3)	15 (−9)	8 (−13)	6 (−14)
Average precipitation inches (mm)	3.37 (86)	3.05 (77)	3.35 (85)	3.29 (84)	3.32 (84)	6.21 (158)	6.60 (168)	6.97 (177)	6.01 (153)	4.33 (110)	2.66 (68)	3.35 (85)	52.51 (1,334)
Average snowfall inches (cm)	0.2 (0.51)	0.1 (0.25)	0.0 (0.0)	0.0 (0.0)	0.0 (0.0)	0.0 (0.0)	0.0 (0.0)	0.0 (0.0)	0.0 (0.0)	0.0 (0.0)	0.0 (0.0)	0.0 (0.0)	0.3 (0.76)
Average precipitation days (≥ 0.01 in)	8.9	8.5	8.2	7.9	8.1	12.1	13.2	13.1	10.2	7.3	6.9	9.3	113.7
Average snowy days (≥ 0.1 in)	0.1	0.1	0.0	0.0	0.0	0.0	0.0	0.0	0.0	0.0	0.0	0.0	0.2
Average relative humidity (%)	69.8	67.4	68.1	67.5	72.5	75.1	76.6	78.9	78.2	74.1	72.7	71.6	72.7
Average dew point °F (°C)	36.0 (2.2)	37.4 (3.0)	44.8 (7.1)	51.3 (10.7)	61.0 (16.1)	67.8 (19.9)	71.4 (21.9)	71.4 (21.9)	66.9 (19.4)	55.9 (13.3)	47.5 (8.6)	39.9 (4.4)	54.3 (12.4)
Mean monthly sunshine hours	179.3	186.7	243.9	275.1	294.8	279.5	287.8	256.7	219.7	224.5	189.5	171.3	2,808.8
Percentage possible sunshine	56	61	66	71	69	65	66	62	59	64	60	55	63
Average ultraviolet index	2.4	3.6	5.4	7.3	8.5	9.3	9.5	8.6	6.9	4.7	2.9	2.2	5.9
Source 1: NOAA (relative humidity and sun 1961–1990)
Source 2: UV Index Today (1995 to 2022)

Climate data for Charleston, South Carolina (Downtown), 1991–2020 normals, extremes 1893–present
Month	Jan	Feb	Mar	Apr	May	Jun	Jul	Aug	Sep	Oct	Nov	Dec	Year
Record high °F (°C)	82 (28)	83 (28)	94 (34)	94 (34)	100 (38)	104 (40)	103 (39)	103 (39)	100 (38)	95 (35)	87 (31)	81 (27)	104 (40)
Mean maximum °F (°C)	72.4 (22.4)	74.8 (23.8)	80.0 (26.7)	83.8 (28.8)	90.1 (32.3)	93.4 (34.1)	95.3 (35.2)	93.9 (34.4)	90.8 (32.7)	85.2 (29.6)	79.2 (26.2)	74.3 (23.5)	96.8 (36.0)
Mean daily maximum °F (°C)	58.0 (14.4)	60.3 (15.7)	65.6 (18.7)	72.3 (22.4)	79.0 (26.1)	84.3 (29.1)	87.5 (30.8)	86.4 (30.2)	82.6 (28.1)	75.6 (24.2)	67.1 (19.5)	60.9 (16.1)	73.3 (22.9)
Daily mean °F (°C)	50.8 (10.4)	53.2 (11.8)	58.8 (14.9)	66.0 (18.9)	73.5 (23.1)	79.2 (26.2)	82.3 (27.9)	81.4 (27.4)	77.6 (25.3)	69.4 (20.8)	60.1 (15.6)	53.8 (12.1)	67.2 (19.6)
Mean daily minimum °F (°C)	43.6 (6.4)	46.1 (7.8)	52.0 (11.1)	59.7 (15.4)	68.0 (20.0)	74.2 (23.4)	77.1 (25.1)	76.5 (24.7)	72.5 (22.5)	63.2 (17.3)	53.1 (11.7)	46.8 (8.2)	61.1 (16.2)
Mean minimum °F (°C)	28.6 (−1.9)	32.3 (0.2)	37.2 (2.9)	46.1 (7.8)	56.3 (13.5)	67.1 (19.5)	71.7 (22.1)	70.8 (21.6)	63.4 (17.4)	48.6 (9.2)	38.9 (3.8)	33.1 (0.6)	26.9 (−2.8)
Record low °F (°C)	10 (−12)	7 (−14)	22 (−6)	36 (2)	45 (7)	52 (11)	61 (16)	59 (15)	50 (10)	37 (3)	17 (−8)	12 (−11)	7 (−14)
Average precipitation inches (mm)	2.56 (65)	2.56 (65)	3.03 (77)	2.96 (75)	2.58 (66)	4.85 (123)	5.08 (129)	6.11 (155)	5.25 (133)	4.07 (103)	2.30 (58)	2.91 (74)	44.26 (1,124)
Average precipitation days (≥ 0.01 in)	8.4	8.0	7.9	7.0	6.8	10.5	11.6	11.7	8.6	6.8	6.1	8.5	101.9
Source: NOAA

=== Statewide climate data ===
Climate data for South Carolina
Month	Jan	Feb	Mar	Apr	May	Jun	Jul	Aug	Sep	Oct	Nov	Dec	Year
Record high °F (°C)	88 (31)	89 (32)	99 (37)	99 (37)	106 (41)	113 (45)	110 (43)	110 (43)	111 (44)	103 (39)	93 (34)	89 (32)	113 (45)
Record low °F (°C)	−19 (−28)	−11 (−24)	−8 (−22)	17 (−8)	28 (−2)	37 (3)	45 (7)	45 (7)	28 (−2)	16 (−9)	−1 (−18)	−6 (−21)	−19 (−28)
Source: "South Carolina Monthly Temperature Extremes".

== Climate change ==
Climate change in South Carolina encompasses the effects of climate change, attributed to man-made increases in atmospheric carbon dioxide, in the U.S. state of South Carolina.

Studies show that South Carolina is among a string of "Deep South" states that will experience the worst effects of climate change. According to the United States Environmental Protection Agency:

South Carolina's climate is changing. Most of the state has warmed by one-half to one degree Fahrenheit (300-600 m°C) in the last century, and the sea is rising about one to one-and-a-half inches (2.5-3.8 cm) every decade. Higher water levels are eroding beaches, submerging low lands, and exacerbating coastal flooding. Like other southeastern states, South Carolina has warmed less than most of the nation. But in the coming decades, the region's changing climate is likely to reduce crop yields, harm livestock, increase the number of unpleasantly hot days, and increase the risk of heat stroke and other heat-related illnesses.

As of January 2020, "South Carolina's failure to develop a comprehensive climate plan means the state has no overall effort to cut greenhouse gas pollution, limit sprawl or educate the public on how to adapt to the changing climate."

== See also ==
- Climate of the United States
- List of wettest tropical cyclones in South Carolina
- United States rainfall climatology
- List of earthquakes in South Carolina
