= Wilson, South Carolina =

- Unincorporated community
- Location within South Carolina Location within the United States
- Coordinates: 33°39′48″N 80°07′06″W
- Country: United States
- State: South Carolina
- County: Clarendon
- Elevation: 118 ft (36 m)
- Time zone: UTC-5 (Eastern (EST))
  - Summer (DST): UTC-4 (EDT)
- ZIP code: 29102
- Area codes: 803, 839

Wilson, formerly Wilson's Mill, is an unincorporated community in Clarendon County, South Carolina United States. The community is located along U.S. Route 521 between Manning and Greeleyville, South Carolina. Wilson formerly had its own post office which operated between 1888 and 1982.

== History ==
The small community of Wilson, sometimes called Ida, is named for Thomas Wilson, a Scotsman originally from Airdrie, North Lanarkshire, who built a sawmill called Wilson's Mill in the area during the late nineteenth century. Wilson and his wife, Eleanor Coyle McCormack had originally immigrated to America from Scotland in 1866. Wilson had worked as a boilermaker with the York and Erie Railroad in New Jersey before migrating south, first to North Carolina and then South Carolina, settling within the vicinity of modern Wilson. His operation eventually included employee housing, a company store, railroad depot, and a post office.

Soon Wilson's Mill gained control of the Santee River logging scene and an eight mile long railroad into Santee Swamp, connecting with the Atlantic Coast Line Railroad from Sumter to Charleston was built. This railroad became known as the Wilson and Summerton Railroad and by 1888 connected with the Charleston, Sumter, and Northern Railroad at Millard, one mile west of Summerton. It was in this same year that the post office, called Wilsons, was established, the name was changed to Wilson in 1894. By 1891, the supply of trees for timber in the area was exhausted and Wilson closed the mill operation and moved away. In 1899, the Wilson and Summerton Railroad was renamed the Northwestern Railroad of South Carolina with main lines from St. Paul to Summerton and Sumter. Wilson served as the president of this railroad until his death in New York City in 1921. The Northwestern Railroad was ultimately abandoned in the aftermath the Great Depression, in 1935.

After the sawmill closed, the community of Wilson turned to agriculture as its primary economic pursuit, with tobacco being the profitable crop. Today, farming continues to be Wilson's driving force. In 1982, Wilson's post office was officially discontinued.

== See also ==
- Thomas Wilson (industrialist)
- Wilson and Summerton Railroad
- Northwestern Railroad of South Carolina
- Company town
