= North Santee, South Carolina =

There are two places named North Santee in the U.S. state of South Carolina:

- North Santee, Clarendon County, South Carolina, a census-designated place
- North Santee, Georgetown County, South Carolina, an unincorporated community
