= Santee National Wildlife Refuge =

United States National Wildlife Refuge in South Carolina

- IUCN category IV (habitat/species management area)
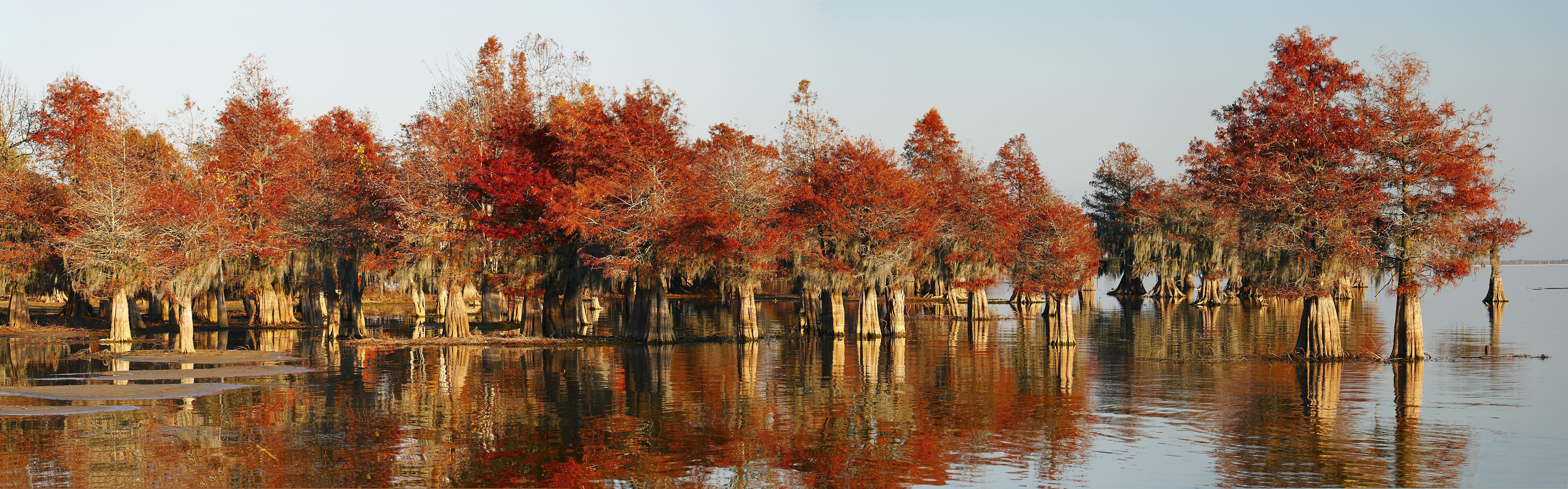
- Bald cypress forest in autumn, Cuddo Unit of refuge

- Location within the United States
- Location: Clarendon County, South Carolina, United States
- Nearest city: Summerton, South Carolina
- Coordinates: 33°31′00″N 80°19′30″W
- Area: 15,000 acres (61 km^{2})
- Established: 1941
- Governing body: U.S. Fish and Wildlife Service
- Website: Santee National Wildlife Refuge

Santee National Wildlife Refuge is a 15,000-acre (61 km^{2}) refuge alongside Lake Marion, an impoundment of the Santee River of Clarendon County, South Carolina.

== Geology ==
The refuge lies within the Atlantic Coastal Plain province of South Carolina. One of the features of the refuge is Dingle Pond, which is a Carolina Bay.

== Human history ==
The refuge contains the Santee Native American mound, which is the furthest eastern known representation of the Mississippian culture. Later built on this same mound was the Revolutionary British Fort Watson, which was taken by Marion's Brigade in April 1781. It has been an important site of archeological investigations.

The refuge was established in 1941. The refuge was formerly much larger, but was reduced greatly in size in 1976 when the Lake Moultrie section in Berkeley County was discontinued due to lease termination.

== Ecology ==
The refuge is especially important because its many wetlands support migratory birds. Within the refuge, which consists of mixed hardwoods and pines, marsh, old croplands, impoundments and open water, is a large diversity of wildlife, including bald eagles, and even the peregrine falcon. More common are deer, raccoons, bobcats, alligators, wood ducks, Canada geese, mallards, pintails, red-tailed hawks, red-shouldered hawks, and wild turkeys.
