= Syphax Milton =

American politician

South Carolina House of Representatives
- In office ?–?

Syphax Milton was an American politician. He was a County Commissioner and then a member of the South Carolina House of Representatives, representing Clarendon County. He served as a county commissioner in 1874.
