= James Building =

James Building may refer to:

- Madison Public Library and the James Building, Madison, New Jersey, listed on the National Register of Historic Places in Morris County, New Jersey
- James Building (Summerton, South Carolina), listed on the National Register of Historic Places in Clarendon County, South Carolina
- James Building (Chattanooga, Tennessee), listed on the National Register of Historic Places in Hamilton County, Tennessee
