= Clarendon County School District =

School district in South Carolina, United States

Clarendon County School District is located in Clarendon County, South Carolina.

== See also ==
- Briggs v. Elliott
