= Davis Station, South Carolina =

- Unincorporated community
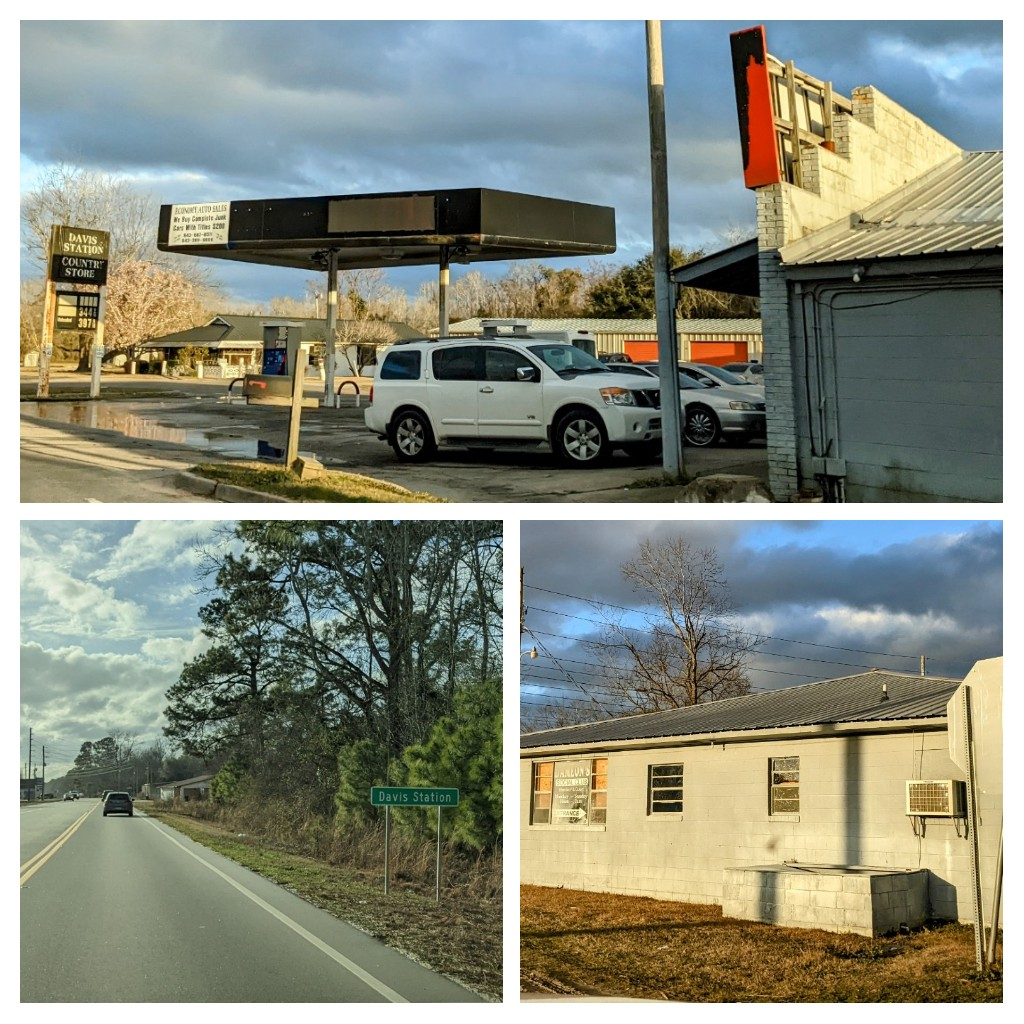

- Location within South Carolina Location within the United States
- Coordinates: 33°36′10″N 80°15′52″W
- Country: United States
- State: South Carolina
- County: Clarendon
- Elevation: 141 ft (43 m)
- Time zone: UTC-5 (Eastern (EST))
  - Summer (DST): UTC-4 (EDT)
- ZIP code: 29041
- Area codes: 803, 839
- GNIS feature ID: 1231214

Davis Station is an unincorporated community in Clarendon County, South Carolina, United States. The community is 7.1 miles (11.4 km) south-southwest of Manning. Davis Station has a post office with ZIP code 29041.
