= Manning Commercial Historic District =

Historic district in South Carolina, United States

- U.S. National Register of Historic Places
- U.S. Historic district
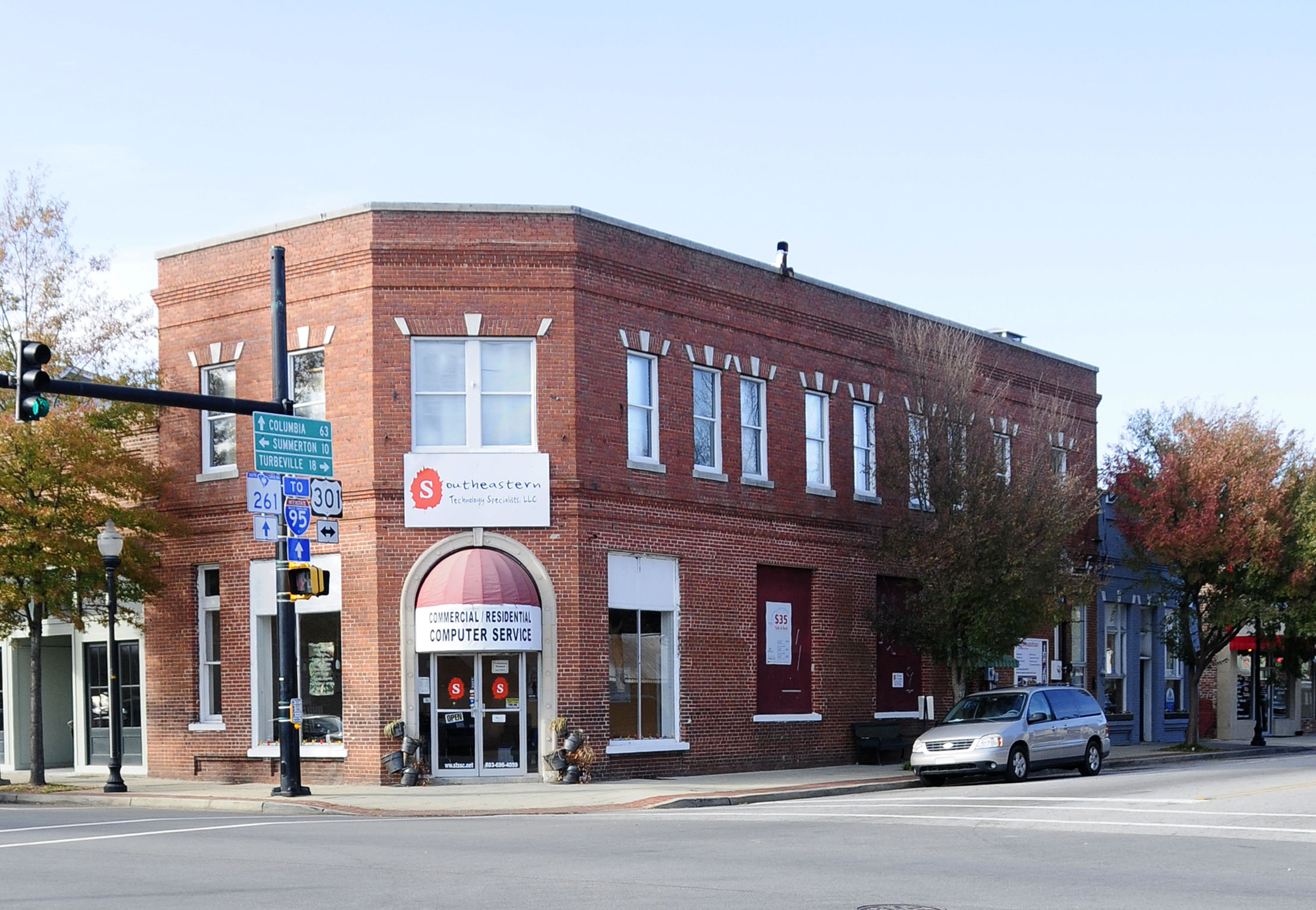
- Manning Commercial Historic District, November 2012

- Location within South Carolina Location within the United States
- Location: Portions of E Boyce, W Boyce, N Brooks, S Brooks, W Keitt, N. Mill, S. Mill, E Rigby, and W Rigby, Manning, South Carolina
- Coordinates: 33°41′43″N 80°12′38″W
- Area: 13 acres (5.3 ha)
- Built: 1909; 117 years ago
- Architect: Shand & Lafaye
- Architectural style: Classical Revival, Moderne
- NRHP reference No.: 10000297
- Added to NRHP: May 28, 2010

Manning Commercial Historic District is a national historic district located at Manning, Clarendon County, South Carolina. The district encompasses 46 contributing buildings and 1 contributing object in the central business district of Manning, county seat for Clarendon County. Manning's downtown is dominated by its 1909 Neo-Classical, red brick courthouse set at the center of a landscaped courthouse square. The commercial district is characterized by one- and two-part commercial block buildings, many of them brick, that were constructed during the late-19th and early-20th century. The buildings are characterized by oblique and angled entrances, intriguing decorative cornices and corbeling, and a preponderance of parapeted rooflines give the Manning Commercial Historic District a clear and unmistakable association with the architecture typical of the early-20th century. In addition to the courthouse, other notable buildings include the U.S. Post Office and Federal Building, Coffey-Rigby Livery Stable, Clarendon Furniture Store, Leonard Building, Manning Hotel, Brailsford Grocery / Schwartz Building, Cut Rate Drug Store, and Pure Oil Service Station.

It was listed on the National Register of Historic Places in 2010.
