= Sardinia, South Carolina =

- Unincorporated community
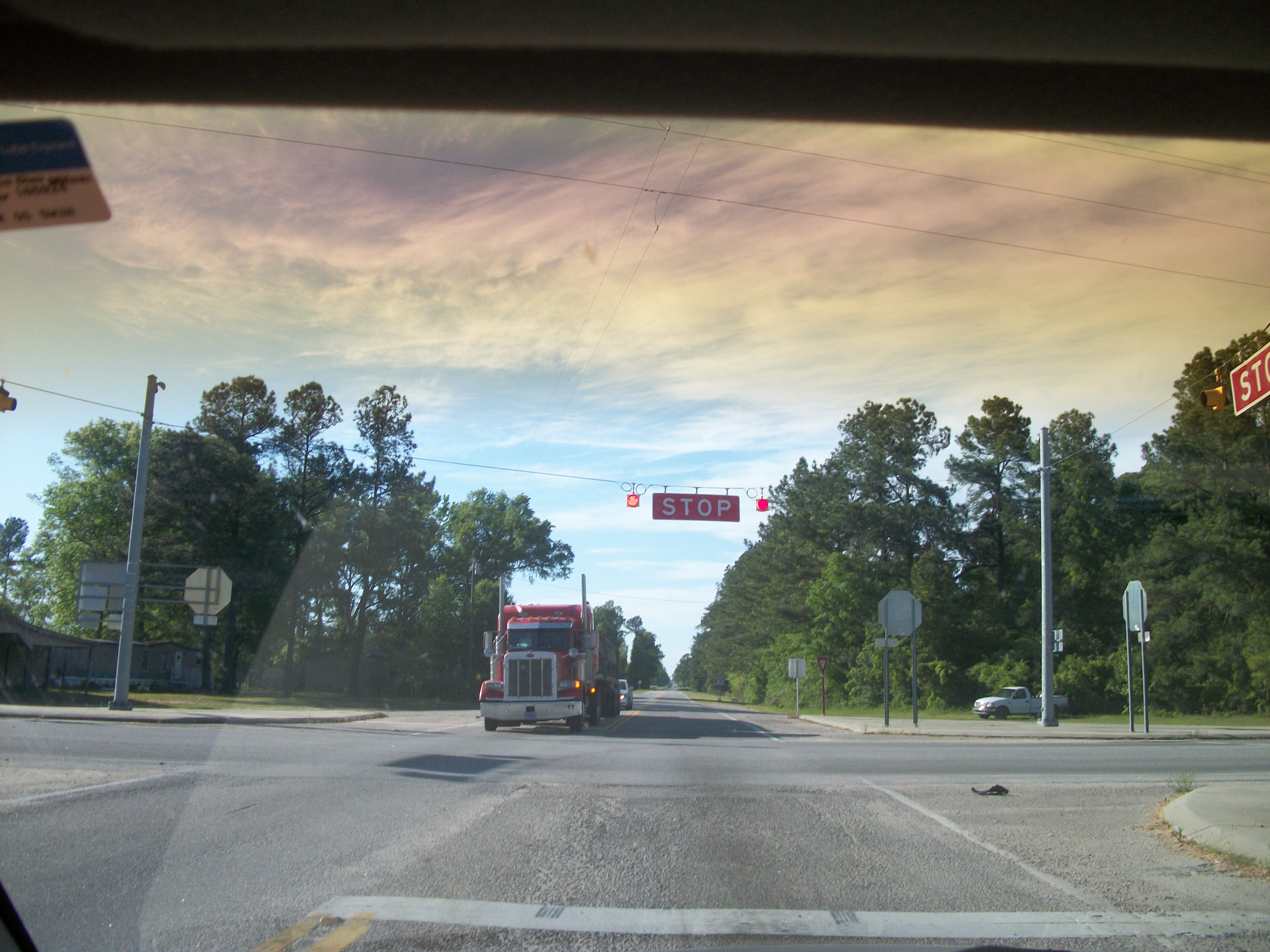
- South Carolina Highway 527 at the intersection with US 301 in Sardinia

- Location within South Carolina Location within the United States
- Coordinates: 33°50′04″N 80°04′58″W
- Country: United States
- State: South Carolina
- County: Clarendon
- Elevation: 102 ft (31 m)
- Time zone: UTC-5 (Eastern (EST))
  - Summer (DST): UTC-4 (EDT)
- ZIP code: 29143
- Area codes: 803, 839
- GNIS feature ID: 1231777

Sardinia is an unincorporated community in Clarendon County, South Carolina, United States. The community is located along U.S. Route 301, 5.4 miles (8.7 km) southwest of Turbeville. Sardinia has a post office with ZIP code 29143.
