= Climate change in South Carolina =

Climate change in the US state of South Carolina

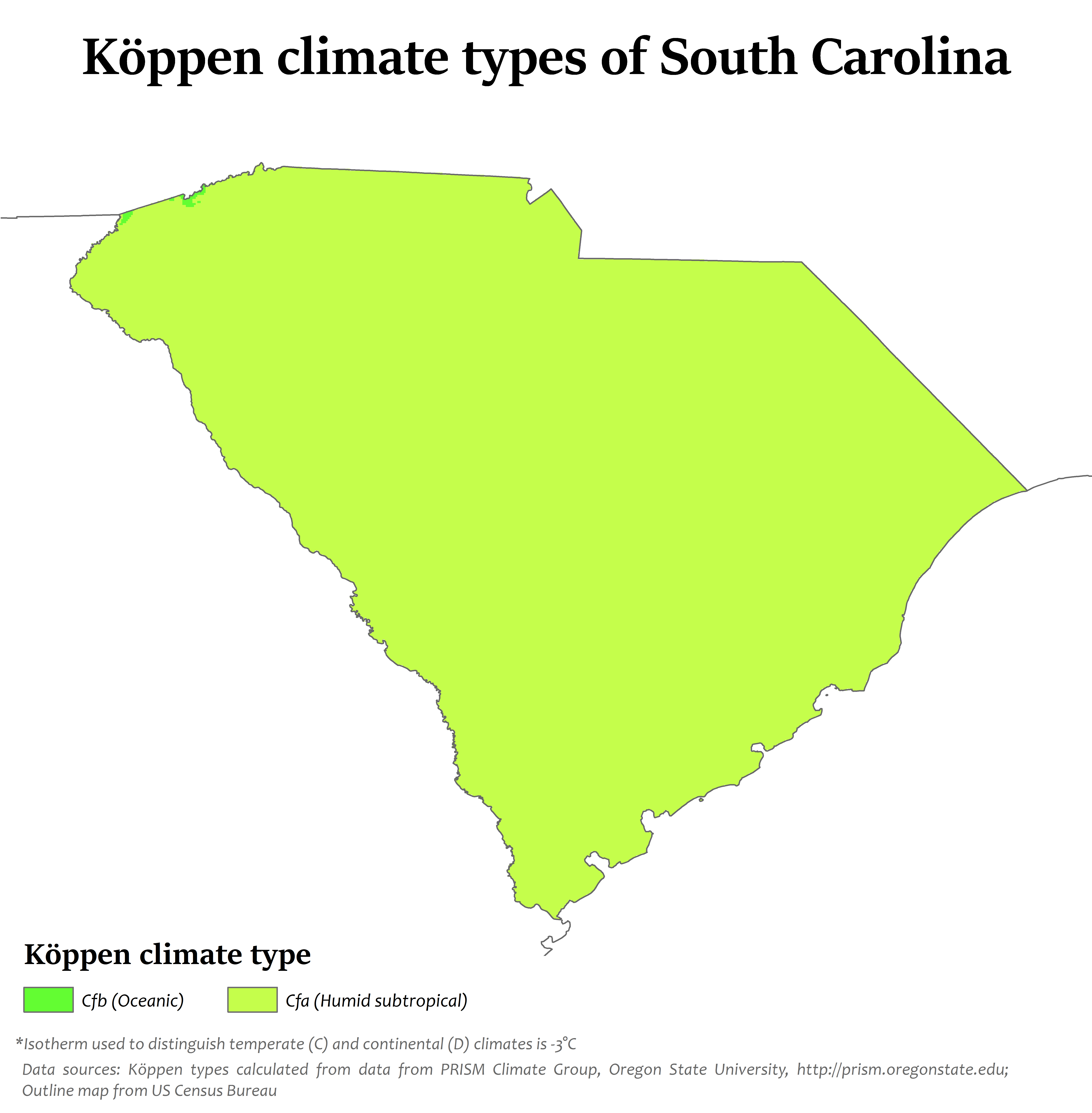
Köppen climate types in South Carolina, showing a large majority of the state being humid subtropical, with smaller, outlier pockets of an oceanic climate in the Blue Ridge Mountains.

Climate change in South Carolina encompasses the effects of climate change, attributed to man-made increases in atmospheric carbon dioxide, in the U.S. state of South Carolina.

Studies show that South Carolina is among a string of "Deep South" states that will experience the worst effects of climate change. According to the United States Environmental Protection Agency:

South Carolina's climate is changing. Most of the state has warmed by one-half to one degree Fahrenheit (300-600 m°C) in the last century, and the sea is rising about one to one-and-a-half inches (2.5-3.8 cm) every decade. Higher water levels are eroding beaches, submerging low lands, and exacerbating coastal flooding. Like other southeastern states, South Carolina has warmed less than most of the nation. But in the coming decades, the region's changing climate is likely to reduce crop yields, harm livestock, increase the number of unpleasantly hot days, and increase the risk of heat stroke and other heat-related illnesses.

As of January 2020, "South Carolina's failure to develop a comprehensive climate plan means the state has no overall effort to cut greenhouse gas pollution, limit sprawl or educate the public on how to adapt to the changing climate."

== Rising seas and retreating shores ==
Nichols has experienced repeated flooding, and coastal areas of Charleston have flooded.

Brackish water incursions into the Waccamaw River near Georgetown due to rising sea levels are increasing the risk of exposure to toxic vibrio bacteria.

"As the oceans warm, seawater expands and raises sea level. Melting ice adds more water to the ocean, further raising sea level. In South Carolina, the land surface is sinking, so the observed rate of sea level rise relative to the land is greater than the global average rise in sea level. If the oceans and atmosphere continue to warm, sea level is likely to rise one to four feet in the next century along the coast of South Carolina".

"As sea level rises, the lowest dry lands are submerged and become either tidal wetland or open water. To some extent, wetlands can create their own land and keep pace with a slowly rising sea. But in many southeastern coastal areas, wetlands will not keep pace, and instead convert to open water. Many species of birds, fish, and shellfish in South Carolina depend on coastal wetlands that are threatened by rising sea level. Salt marshes provide habitat for clams, mussels, oysters, and other shellfish. They also provide nurseries and feeding grounds for many fish, and provide food for birds, such as egrets and the endangered wood stork".

"Beaches also erode as sea level rises. A higher water level makes it more likely that storm waves will wash over a barrier island or open new inlets. Eroding shores will threaten homes throughout the South Carolina coast unless people take measures to prevent shore erosion".

The City of Charleston proposed an 8-mile seawall to mitigate the impact of seawater rise around the peninsula of Charleston. The decision is still pending per a final design decision between the City and the U.S. Army Corps of Engineers.

== Storms, homes, and infrastructure ==
"Tropical storms and hurricanes have become more intense during the past 20 years. Although warming oceans provide these storms with more potential energy, scientists are not sure whether the recent intensification reflects a long-term trend. Nevertheless, hurricane wind speeds and rainfall rates are likely to increase as the climate continues to warm".

"Whether or not storms become more intense, coastal homes and infrastructure will flood more often as sea level rises, because storm surges will become higher as well. Rising sea level is likely to increase flood insurance rates, while more frequent storms could increase the deductible for wind damage in homeowner insurance policies. Charleston and the barrier islands are especially vulnerable to the impacts of storms and sea level rise".

"Changing the climate is also likely to increase inland flooding. Since 1958, the amount of precipitation during heavy rainstorms has increased by 27 percent in the Southeast, and the trend toward increasingly heavy rainstorms is likely to continue."

Additionally, winters may see instances of colder temperatures as a result of polar vortices dipping from the North Pole into the deep South coupled with storms as can be seen in the February 13-17 2021 North American winter storm.

== State policy ==
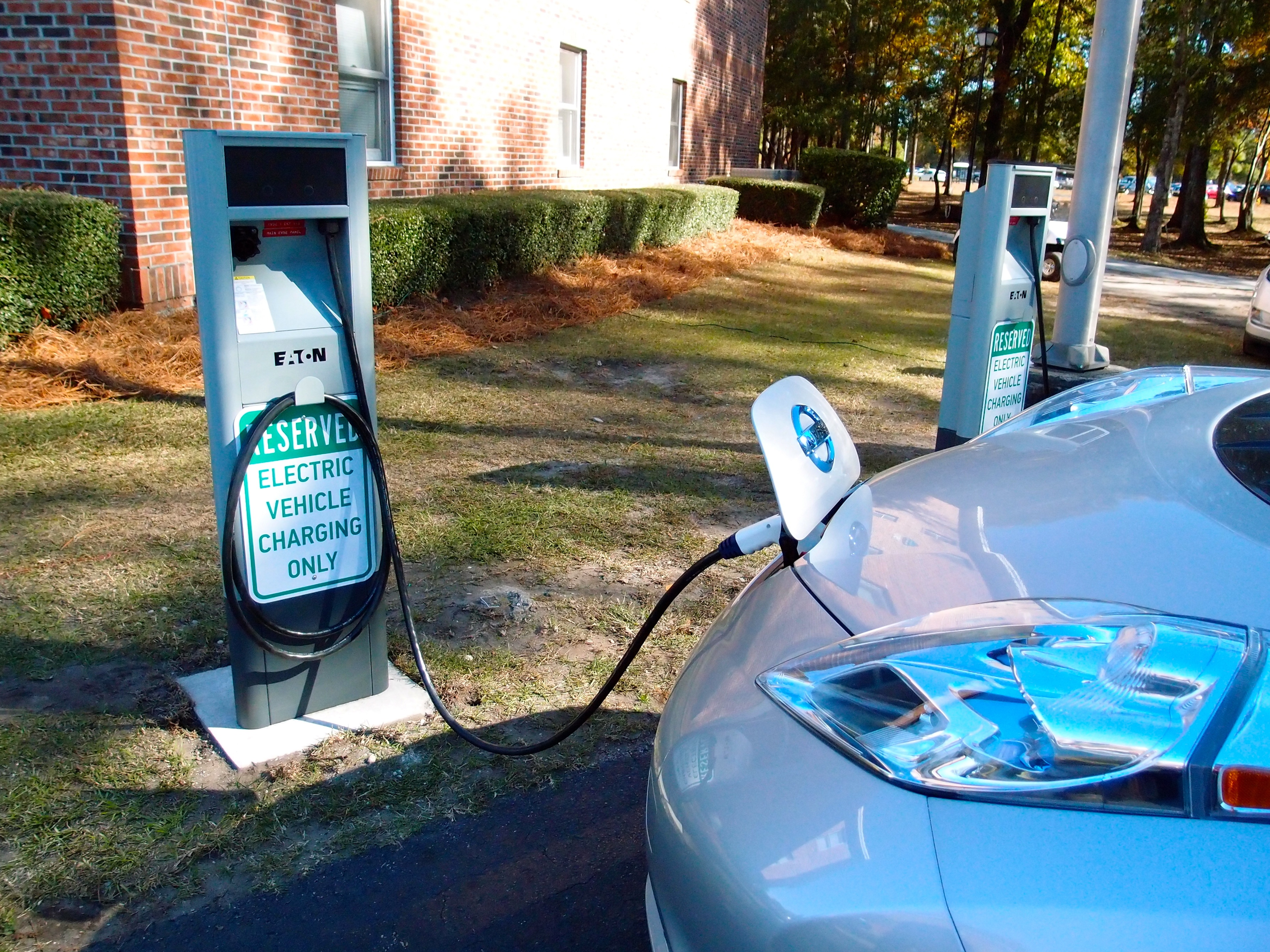
Electric vehicle charging station

As of January 2020, South Carolina had no state-level plans for climate change, and politicians and departments in the state convey mixed, non-centralized approaches. At the top level, governor Henry McMaster has expressed disinterest in a statewide climate plan, arguing that it would create excessive bureaucracy. On the departmental level, the state wildlife department released a report in 2013 on the climate-related problems predicted for wildlife, such as an increase in invasive species. However, this report had been suppressed for two years prior to release.

In 2008, Governor Mark Sanford organized a special task force to recommend strategies to reduce greenhouse gas emissions. Though the subsequent report recommended over fifty strategies, criticism by utilities and political appointees resulted in the report not being used.

== Agriculture ==
"Changing the climate will have both harmful and beneficial effects on farming. During the next few decades, hotter summers are likely to reduce yields of corn. But higher concentrations of atmospheric carbon dioxide increase crop yields, and that fertilizing effect is likely to offset the harmful effects of heat on cotton, soybeans, wheat, and peanuts—assuming that adequate water is available. More severe droughts, however, could cause crop failures. Higher temperatures are also likely to reduce livestock productivity, because heat stress disrupts the animals' metabolism".

== Forests ==
"Higher temperatures and changes in rainfall are unlikely to substantially reduce forest cover in South Carolina, although the composition of trees in the forests may change. More droughts would reduce forest productivity, and climate change is also likely to increase the damage from insects and disease. But longer growing seasons and increased concentrations of carbon dioxide could more than offset the losses from those factors. Today forests cover two-thirds of the state. Loblolly pine trees dominate forests in most of the state, while oak, gum, and cypress trees are common in northeastern South Carolina; and oak and white pine are more common in the mountains. Changing the climate may alter the composition of forests throughout the state to more closely reflect the oak and white pine forests found today in the mountains".

== Political action ==
The City of Charleston is suing several major oil companies as part of climate change litigation, claiming that the damages causes by sea level rise and extreme weather were exacerbated by negligence on part of oil companies.

== See also ==
- Plug-in electric vehicles in South Carolina
