= Wilson and Summerton Railroad =

Overview
- Locale: South Carolina
- Dates of operation: 1888–1899
- Successor: Northwestern Railroad of South Carolina

Technical
- Track gauge: 4 ft 8 1/2 in (1,435 mm) standard gauge
- Length: 16.5 mi

The Wilson and Summerton Railroad was a railroad that served South Carolina in the late 19th century.

The Wilson and Summerton Railroad was chartered by the South Carolina General Assembly in 1888. Construction the following year linked Millard Junction, South Carolina, to Wilson's Mill, South Carolina, a distance of about 16.5 miles.

The line served as a link between the Atlantic Coast Line Railroad and the Central Railroad of South Carolina.

In 1899, the name of the line was changed to the Northwestern Railroad of South Carolina.
