= Wyboo, South Carolina =

- Census-designated place
- Location within South Carolina Location within the United States
- Coordinates: 33°32′42″N 80°14′02″W
- Country: United States
- State: South Carolina
- County: Clarendon

Area
  - Total: 17.38 sq mi (45.02 km^{2})
  - Land: 14.97 sq mi (38.76 km^{2})
  - Water: 2.42 sq mi (6.26 km^{2})
- Elevation: 85 ft (26 m)

Population (2020)
  - Total: 3,661
  - Density: 244.7/sq mi (94.46/km^{2})
- Time zone: UTC-5 (Eastern (EST))
  - Summer (DST): UTC-4 (EDT)
- ZIP Codes: 29102 (Manning); 29148 (Summerton)
- Area codes: 803/839
- FIPS code: 45-79341
- GNIS feature ID: 2804705

Wyboo is a lakeside community and census-designated place (CDP) in Clarendon County, South Carolina, United States. It was first listed as a CDP prior to the 2020 census with a population of 3,661.

The CDP is in southern Clarendon County, on both sides of Wyboo Swamp, an arm of Lake Marion, the largest lake in South Carolina. South Carolina Highway 260 passes through the east side of the community, leading north 9 miles (14 km) to Manning, the county seat. The south end of Highway 260 is at the Santee Dam, which forms Lake Marion by impounding the Santee River.

== Demographics ==
Historical population
Census	Pop.	Note	%±
2020	3,661		—
U.S. Decennial Census; 2020

Wyboo first appeared as a census designated place in the 2020 U.S. census.

=== 2020 census ===
As of the 2020 census, Wyboo had a population of 3,661. The median age was 60.0 years. 13.0% of residents were under the age of 18 and 40.5% were 65 years of age or older. For every 100 females, there were 100.8 males, and for every 100 females age 18 and over, there were 98.0 males age 18 and over.

0.0% of residents lived in urban areas, while 100.0% lived in rural areas.

There were 1,765 households in Wyboo, of which 15.6% had children under the age of 18 living in them. Of all households, 51.4% were married-couple households, 17.5% were households with a male householder and no spouse or partner present, and 26.5% were households with a female householder and no spouse or partner present. About 31.8% of all households were made up of individuals, and 18.4% had someone living alone who was 65 years of age or older.

There were 2,972 housing units, of which 40.6% were vacant. The homeowner vacancy rate was 4.5%, and the rental vacancy rate was 12.9%.

Wyboo CDP, South Carolina – Demographic Profile (NH = Non-Hispanic)
Race / Ethnicity	Pop 2020	% 2020
White alone (NH)	2,994	81.78%
Black or African American alone (NH)	455	12.43%
Native American or Alaska Native alone (NH)	17	0.46%
Asian alone (NH)	27	0.74%
Pacific Islander alone (NH)	0	0.00%
Some Other Race alone (NH)	3	0.08%
Mixed Race/Multi-Racial (NH)	107	2.92%
Hispanic or Latino (any race)	58	1.58%
Total	3,661	100.00%

Note: the US Census treats Hispanic/Latino as an ethnic category. This table excludes Latinos from the racial categories and assigns them to a separate category. Hispanics/Latinos can be of any race.

== Education ==
It is partly in Clarendon School District 2 and partly in Clarendon School District 1.
