= Northwestern Railroad of South Carolina =

Railroad in South Carolina between 1884 and 1935

The Northwestern Railroad of South Carolina was a South Carolina railroad that traced its history back to the 1880s and survived until the mid-1930s.

The line, chartered in 1899 by the South Carolina General Assembly, ran from Northwestern Junction, near Camden, South Carolina, to Wilson's Mill, a distance of a little more than 61 miles, and included branch lines projecting from Manville Junction to Rose Hill, and from Millard Junction to St. Paul.

The carrier was controlled jointly by Thomas Wilson, its president, and The Atlantic Coast Line Railroad, and is operated as a part of the Atlantic Coast Line's system. The carrier's headquarters and shops were located in Sumter, South Carolina.

The Northwestern traced its history back to the Eutawville Railroad, which was chartered by the South Carolina General Assembly in 1884. In 1890, the Eatawville changed its name to the Charleston, Sumter and Northern Railroad.

The Charleston and Northern was created after the Atlantic Coast Line Railroad bought the Charleston, Sumter and Northern Railroad in October 1894, and the following year reorganized it under the Charleston and Northern Railroad to prevent it from being used by a competitor.

In 1895, property, franchises, and rights of the Charleston and Northern were sold, and a portion of the line acquired by the Wilson and Summerton Railroad. The Wilson and Summerton changed its name to the Northwestern in 1899.

The end came in 1935, after a federal district court issued an order calling for discontinuance of service. The line had been in receivership since October 1934 and was offered for sale in April 1935 but couldn't find a buyer.

A story in the Sumter Item in 1935 attributed the line's demise to competition of trucks and dwindling lumber business, which hurt the company's bottom line. "The losses continued to mount and the road was placed in receivership in 1934," according to the article.
