= North Santee, Clarendon County, South Carolina =

North Santee, South Carolina
- Census-designated place
- Location within South Carolina Location within the United States
- Coordinates: 33°31′12″N 80°24′45″W
- Country: United States
- State: South Carolina
- County: Clarendon

Area
  - Total: 11.16 sq mi (28.90 km^{2})
  - Land: 9.11 sq mi (23.59 km^{2})
  - Water: 2.05 sq mi (5.31 km^{2})
- Elevation: 85 ft (26 m)

Population (2020)
  - Total: 749
  - Density: 82.3/sq mi (31.76/km^{2})
- Time zone: UTC-5 (Eastern (EST))
  - Summer (DST): UTC-4 (EDT)
- ZIP Code: 29148 (Summerton)
- Area codes: 803/839
- FIPS code: 45-51367
- GNIS feature ID: 2804703

North Santee is a census-designated place (CDP) in Clarendon County, South Carolina, United States. It was first listed as a CDP prior to the 2020 census with a population of 749.

The CDP is on the southwestern edge of Clarendon County, on the northeast shore of Lake Marion, a reservoir on the Santee River. Interstate 95 crosses Lake Marion at North Santee, with access from Exit 102. U.S. Routes 15 and 301 pass through the CDP as a surface highway, joining I-95 at Exit 102 to cross the lake. Summerton is 7 miles (11 km) to the northeast, and Santee is 5 miles (8 km) to the southwest in Orangeburg County.

Santee Indian Mound and Fort Watson is a historic site in the north part of the CDP, near the shore of Lake Marion.

== Demographics ==
Historical population
Census	Pop.	Note	%±
2020	749		—
U.S. Decennial Census; 2020

North Santee first appeared as a census designated place in the 2020 U.S. census.

=== 2020 census ===
North Santee CDP, South Carolina – Demographic Profile (NH = Non-Hispanic)
Race / Ethnicity	Pop 2020	% 2020
White alone (NH)	639	85.31%
Black or African American alone (NH)	79	10.55%
Native American or Alaska Native alone (NH)	0	0.00%
Asian alone (NH)	3	0.40%
Pacific Islander alone (NH)	0	0.00%
Some Other Race alone (NH)	0	0.00%
Mixed Race/Multi-Racial (NH)	20	2.67%
Hispanic or Latino (any race)	8	1.07%
Total	749	100.00%

Note: the US Census treats Hispanic/Latino as an ethnic category. This table excludes Latinos from the racial categories and assigns them to a separate category. Hispanics/Latinos can be of any race.

== Education ==
It is in Clarendon School District 1.
