= Plug-in electric vehicles in South Carolina =

As of January 2021, there were about 6,300 electric vehicles (including plug-in hybrid vehicles) in South Carolina.

== Government policy ==
As of 2022, the state government does not offer any tax incentives for electric vehicle purchases.

As of 2021, the state government charges a $120 biennial registration fee for fully electric vehicles, and a $60 fee for plug-in hybrid vehicles.

== Charging stations ==
As of 2021, there were 384 public charging stations in South Carolina.

The Infrastructure Investment and Jobs Act, signed into law in November 2021, allocates US$70 million to charging stations in South Carolina.

== By region ==
=== Charleston ===
As of August 2022, there were 8 public charging stations in Charleston.

=== Columbia ===
In 2022, Richland County School District One purchased the first electric school bus in South Carolina.
