= James Building (Summerton, South Carolina) =

- U.S. National Register of Historic Places
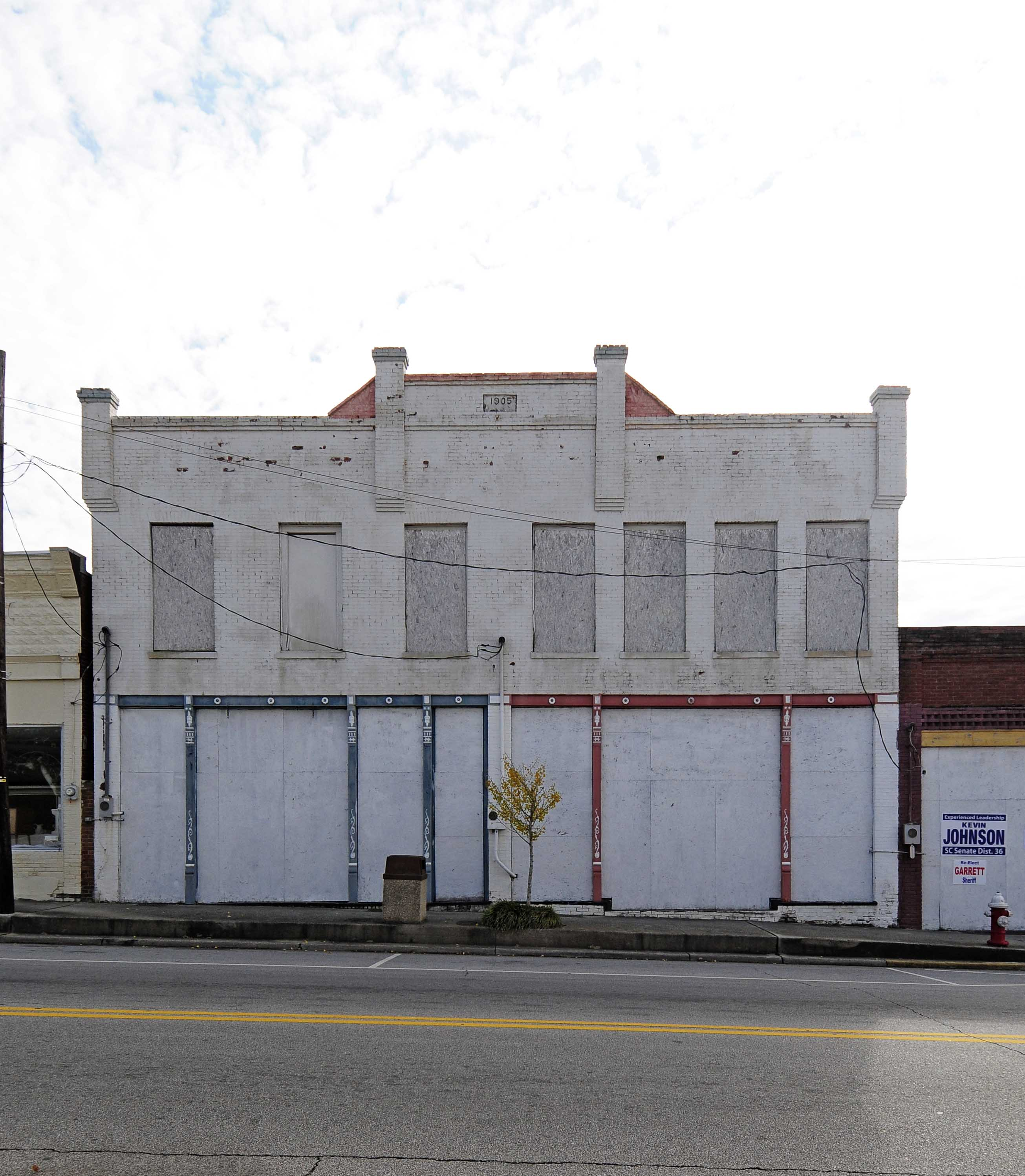
- James Building, November 2012

- Location within South Carolina Location within the United States
- Location: 124-126 Main St., Summerton, South Carolina
- Coordinates: 33°36′28″N 80°21′2″W
- Area: less than one acre
- Built: 1905
- Architectural style: Late 19th And Early 20th Century American Movements
- NRHP reference No.: 07000222
- Added to NRHP: March 28, 2007

James Building, also known as Summerton Hardware and Summerton Hardware Company, is a historic commercial building located at Summerton, Clarendon County, South Carolina. It was built in 1905, and is a two-story brick building with a cast-iron storefront. The building has two storefronts and interior spaces with single-story sections to the rear. The building housed the telephone exchange and a hardware store and would have been a central focus of the town in the early-20th century.

It was listed in the National Register of Historic Places in 2007.
