= Davis House (Manning, South Carolina) =

Historic house in South Carolina, United States

- U.S. National Register of Historic Places
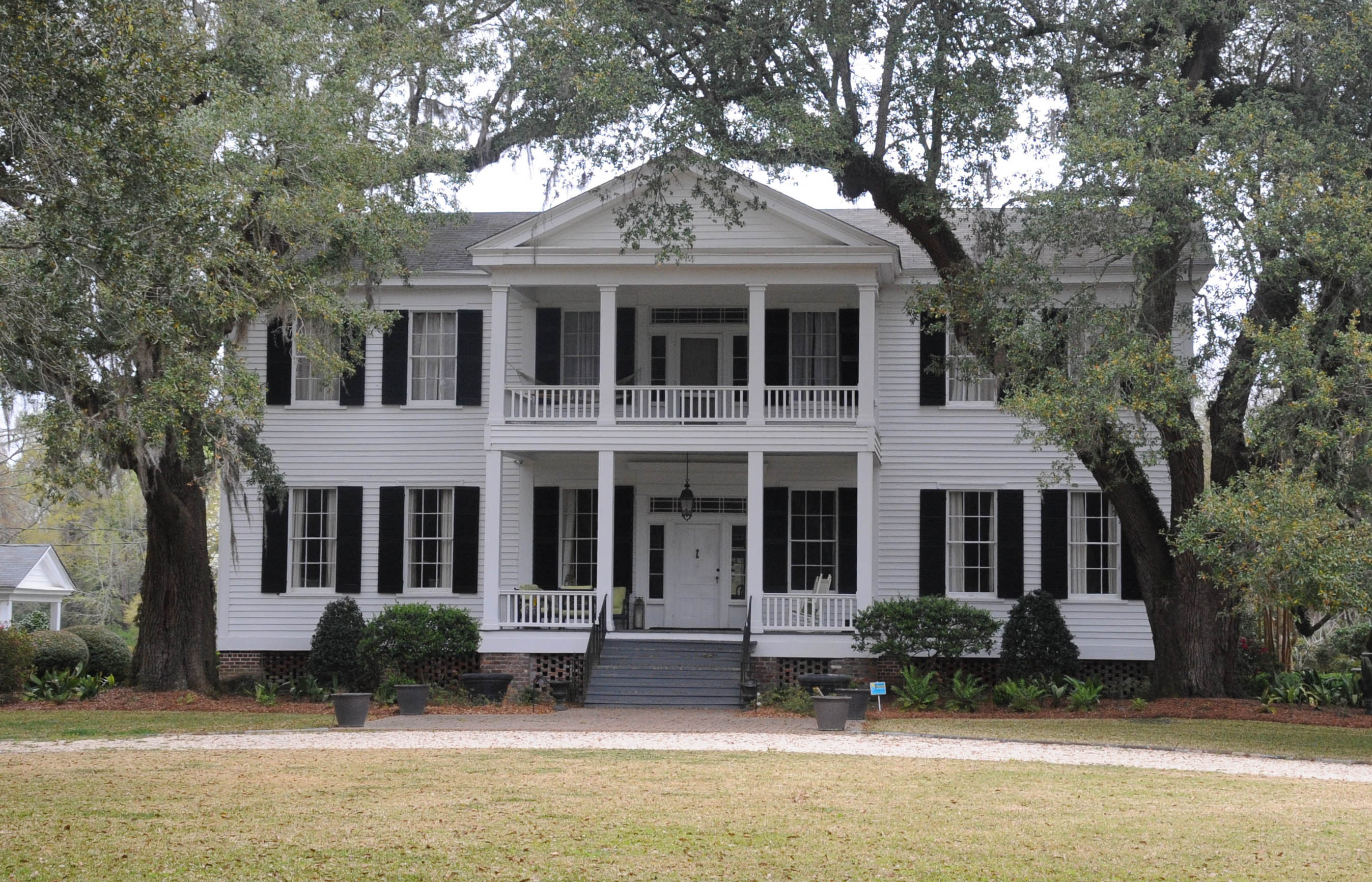
- Davis House, 2019

- Location within South Carolina Location within the United States
- Location: South of Manning on South Carolina Highway 63, near Manning, South Carolina
- Coordinates: 33°39′09″N 80°13′33″W
- Area: 30 acres (12 ha)
- Built: c. 1843
- Architectural style: Greek Revival
- NRHP reference No.: 83002191
- Added to NRHP: January 13, 1983

Davis House (also known as El Recuerdo) is a historic plantation house located near Manning, Clarendon County, South Carolina.

== Description and history ==
It was built about 1843, and is a two-story, frame vernacular Greek Revival style dwelling. It has weatherboard sheathing, a gable roof, and one-story, gabled-roofed ells at either side. The façade features a central, two-tiered portico with four pillars on each level. The house was built by Bertrand Davis, a locally known planter and militia officer.

It was listed in the National Register of Historic Places on January 13, 1983.
