= Rimini, South Carolina =

- Unincorporated community
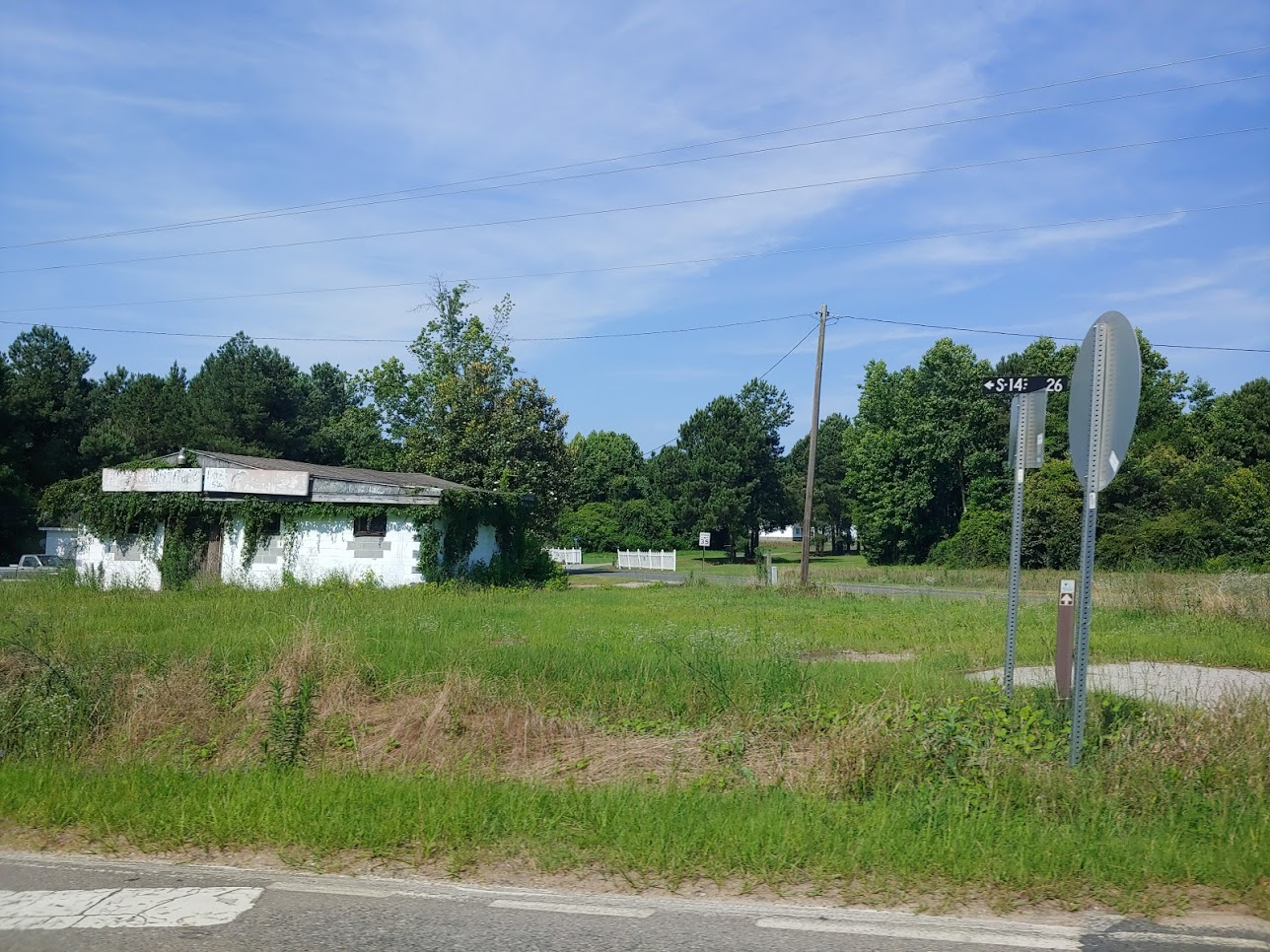
- Intersection of Packs Landing Rd. and Camp Mac Boykin Rd. in Rimini

- Location within South Carolina Location within the United States
- Coordinates: 33°40′10″N 80°30′01″W
- Country: United States
- State: South Carolina
- County: Clarendon
- Elevation: 135 ft (41 m)
- Time zone: UTC-5 (Eastern (EST))
  - Summer (DST): UTC-4 (EDT)
- ZIP code: 29125
- Area codes: 803, 839
- GNIS feature ID: 1250390

Rimini is an unincorporated community in Clarendon County, South Carolina, United States. The community is located 9.5 miles (15.3 km) west southwest of Summerton, and 17 miles (27 km) west of Manning. The ZIP code for Rimini is 29125.

== History ==
Founded in the late 1800's as a farming community, Rimini benefited from the construction of the Manchester and Augusta Railroad that connected Sumter, South Carolina to Denmark, South Carolina. Originally called Yorkville, the name likely became Rimini due to the influence of Italian immigrant laborers that assisted with the construction of the nearby railroad.

Prior to the community's founding, the location was home to a major Native American trade route. The trade route eventually became an important and strategic thoroughfare between the cities of Charleston and Camden South Carolina during the American Revolutionary War.

Today, the community is mainly supported through agriculture and nearby recreational opportunities such as fishing and hunting.
