= Alderman's 20 Stores in One =

- U.S. National Register of Historic Places
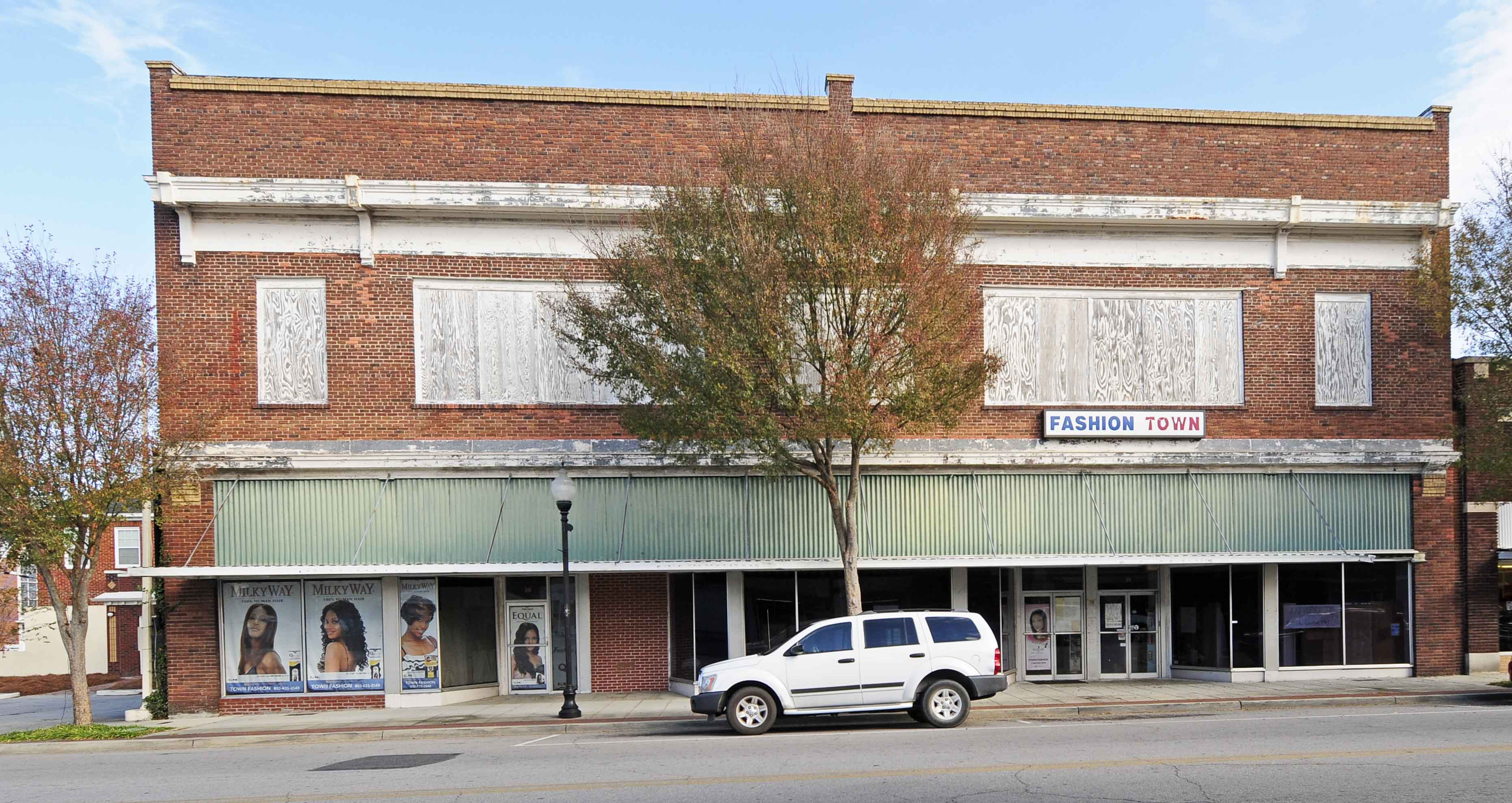
- Alderman's 20 Stores in One, November 2012

- Location within South Carolina Location within the United States
- Location: 34 and 36 Brooks St., Manning, South Carolina
- Coordinates: 33°41′14″N 80°12′38″W
- Area: less than one acre
- Built: 1919
- Architect: Alderman, David W.
- Architectural style: Early Commercial
- NRHP reference No.: 94001047
- Added to NRHP: August 26, 1994

Alderman's 20 Stores in One, also known as The Belk Building, is a historic commercial building located at Manning, Clarendon County, South Carolina. It was built in 1919, and is a two-story red brick building or two-part commercial block with a flat roof and parapets. The main façade of the building features a metal entablature supported by brackets and ornamented by recessed panels. Constructed by David W. Alderman, a wealthy Clarendon County lumber merchant and entrepreneur, the building is the largest storefront in the main business section of downtown Manning.

Belk operated from the building from 1955 to the late-1980s. In 2022, technology company Provalus moved its Manning operations to the building.

It was listed in the National Register of Historic Places in 1994.
