= Thomas Wilson (industrialist) =

Southern American business magnate

Thomas Wilson was a Southern American business entrepreneur and magnate. He was active from the early 1850s until his death in the early 20th century.

== Early life and work ==
Wilson immigrated to the United States in the 1850s from Scotland, where he had been raised by his grandfather, a Scottish laird. Although he came from an aristocratic family, Wilson had little education. He and his wife arrived in New York City with less than one pound. He was hired on as an apprentice boilermaker and rose quickly along the corporate ladder.

By the end of the American Civil War, Wilson owned a chain of foundries. He and his family moved to Sumter, South Carolina, and established a number of companies throughout the South.

Wilson developed the Northwestern Railroad of South Carolina and later served as head of the Atlantic Coast Line Railroad, the St. Charles Hotel and the First National Bank of Sumter, among others.

== Later life, work, and death ==
By 1864 he had fathered several children, one of whom had died. He owned large swathes of land throughout the South; with especially large ones in Florida. His land holdings included all of what is now Myrtle Beach, South Carolina. By the end of his life, he was the wealthiest person in South Carolina.
