= Santee Indian Mound and Fort Watson =

Archaeological site in South Carolina, United States

- U.S. National Register of Historic Places
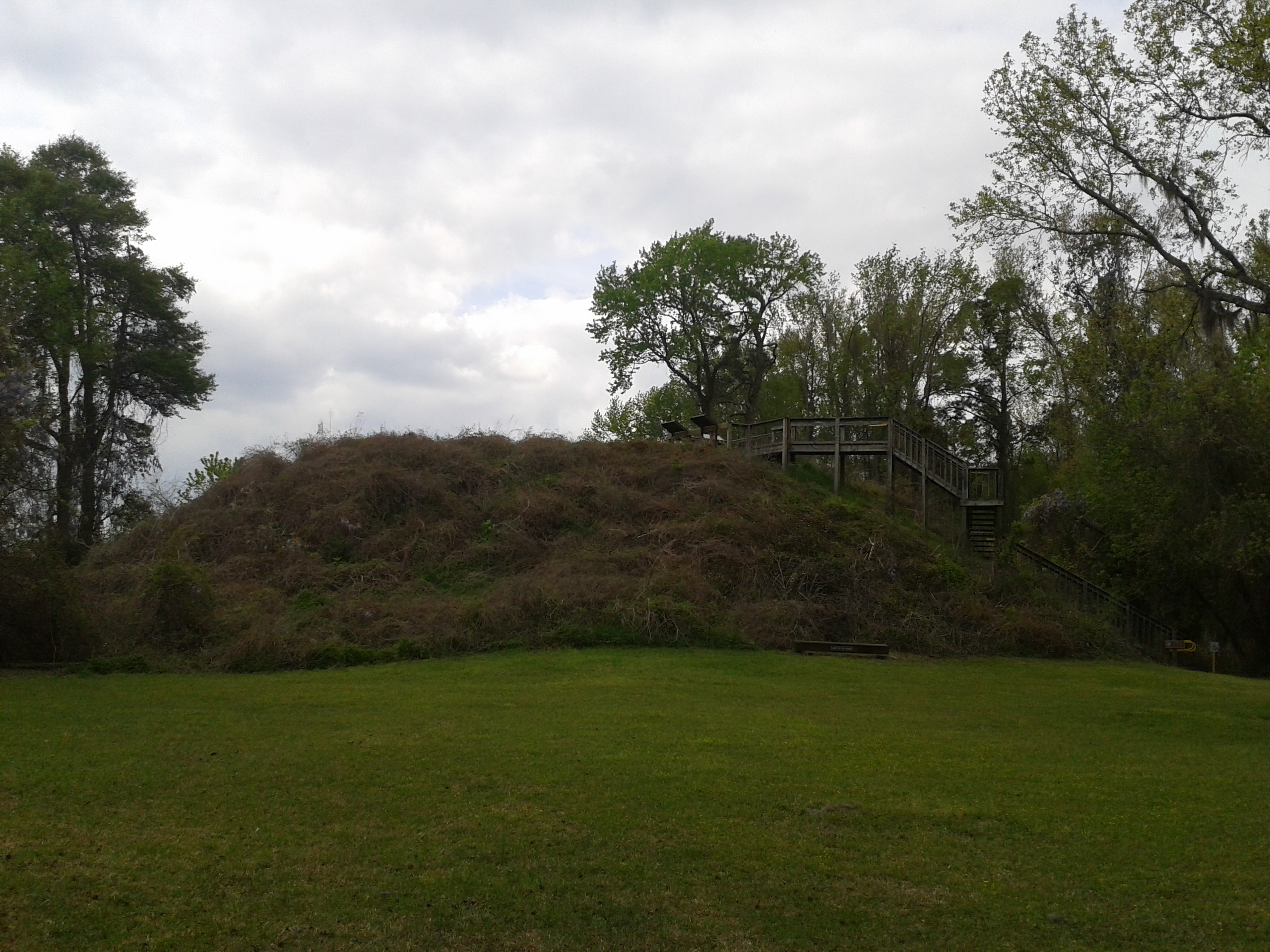
- The mound in April, 2015

- Location within South Carolina Location within the United States
- Nearest city: North Santee, South Carolina
- Coordinates: 33.53896°N 80.43783°W
- Area: 0 acres (0 ha)
- NRHP reference No.: 69000164
- Added to NRHP: July 29, 1969

Santee Indian Mound and Fort Watson is a historic archaeological site located in North Santee, Clarendon County, South Carolina, near Summerton. Santee Indian Mound was part of a Santee mound village complex; it was probably a burial and/or temple mound, likely constructed in some cultural period between 1200–1500.

The fortification, British American Revolutionary War post Fort Watson, was built from 30 to 50 feet (9.1 to 15.2 m) high atop the mound. In 1780, Francis Marion and Light Horse Harry Lee decided to capture the fort in the Siege of Fort Watson. Fort Watson was the first fortified British military outpost in South Carolina recaptured by patriot forces after the British occupation of 1780. There are no remains of Fort Watson on the site.

It was listed in the National Register of Historic Places in 1969. Today it is located in the Santee National Wildlife Refuge.
