= Siege of Fort Watson =

1781 siege of the American Revolutionary War

- Part of the American Revolutionary War
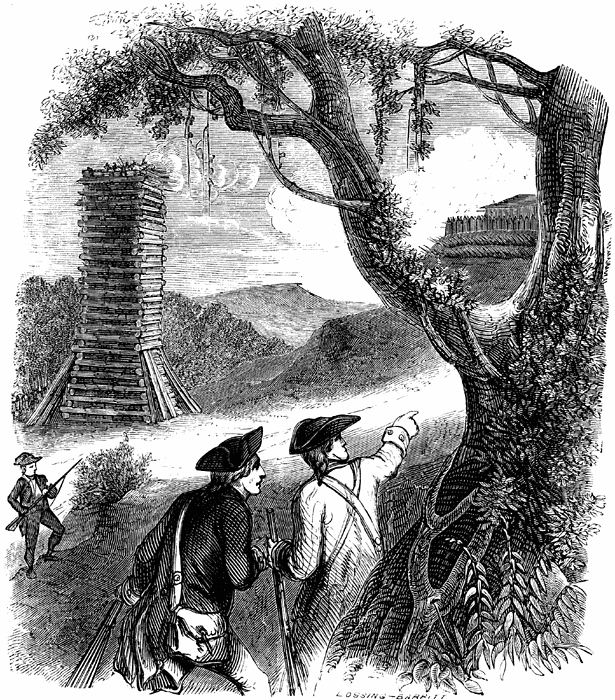
- 19th-century engraving depicting the siege tower
Date	April 15–23, 1781
Location	near present-day Summerton, South Carolina 33.53896°N 80.43783°W
Result	American victory

Belligerents
United States	Great Britain

Commanders and leaders
Francis Marion; Henry Lee III	James McKay (surrendered)

Strength
300 regulars 80 militia	80 regulars 40 militia

Casualties and losses
2 killed 6 wounded	120 captured

The siege of Fort Watson was an American Revolutionary War confrontation in South Carolina that began on April 15, 1781, and lasted until April 23, 1781. Continental Army forces under Henry "Light Horse Harry" Lee and South Carolina militia under Francis Marion besieged Fort Watson, a fortified British outpost that formed part of the communication and supply chain between Charleston and other British outposts further inland.

The attackers, lacking artillery, were unable to make a dent in the fortified works, and failed in attempts to deny the garrison of a water supply. They then devised a plan to build a tower from which sharpshooters could fire into the fort's walls. Fort Watson was once again attacked by the Americans on April 23, with the British forces unable to control the walls due to musket fire from the tower. They surrendered shortly afterwards.

== Background ==
Great Britain's "southern strategy" for winning the American Revolutionary War appeared in some ways to be going well after the Battle of Guilford Courthouse in March 1781. General Lord Cornwallis had defeated General Nathanael Greene, but his army was short on supplies and had suffered significant casualties, so he decided to move to Wilmington, North Carolina to resupply and refit his troops. Greene, while he had lost the battlefield, still had his army intact. After shadowing Cornwallis for a time, he turned south, and embarked on an expedition to recover Patriot control of South Carolina and Georgia, where British and Loyalist forces were thinly distributed, and smaller outposts were subject to attack from larger forces under the command of Greene or one of the Patriot militia commanders in the area.

He first ordered Colonel Henry "Light Horse Harry" Lee to continue shadowing Cornwallis so that his southward movement was screened. Once he was on his way into South Carolina, he ordered Lee to abandon Cornwallis and instead join forces with militia Colonel Francis Marion in the eastern part of the state. Lee and Marion met on April 14, and first targeted Fort Watson, a small stockaded fort on the east side of the Santee River.

== Siege ==
John Watson, the commander of the fort, had gone to Lord Rawdon at Camden, and left Lieutenant James McKay in command of 120 men. When Marion and Lee first approached the fort on April 16, their thought was to cut off the fort's water supply, as there was no decent cover near the fort for attack or sniping. While they successfully denied the fort access to the nearby lake, the garrison dug a well, frustrating that plan.

One of Marion's subordinates, Major Hezikiah Maham, then came up with the idea of building a log tower of green pine with sufficient height and thickness to allow protected sharpshooters in the nest up top to fire into the fort. After several days' preparation off-site, the approximately 30-foot-tall (9.1 m) tower was brought within effective firing range and erected on the night of April 22. The next day the Americans attacked, with riflemen shooting into the fort, forcing the defenders off the walls. Simultaneously, two forlorn hope parties attacked and successfully scaled them, forcing the surrender of the garrison shortly thereafter.

== Aftermath ==
The victory broke one link in the chain of communications and supply outposts between Charleston and Camden. Lee and Marion next chased after Watson, to whom Rawdon had given 500 men and the task of chasing down Marion, at least until it became known that Lee had joined with Marion, turning the tables. Since Greene's destination was Camden, he wanted to prevent Watson from rejoining Rawdon before he got there. In this, Lee and Marion were successful; Rawdon, concerned about his supply line, battled Greene at Hobkirk's Hill north of Camden without the benefit of Watson's men. Rawdon, although he won the battlefield, later withdrew to Charleston.

== Legacy ==
The remarkable success of the "Maham Tower" resulted in its being employed in a number of subsequent actions, most notably at the Siege of Ninety Six the following month. The fort's site, which is also the site of a Santee Indian burial mound, is a historic site listed on the National Register of Historic Places in 1969 as the Santee Indian Mound and Fort Watson in Clarendon County, South Carolina.

== See also ==
- American Revolutionary War § War in the South. Places ' siege of Fort Watson ' in overall sequence and strategic context.
