= Clarendon County, South Carolina =

County in South Carolina, United States

- County
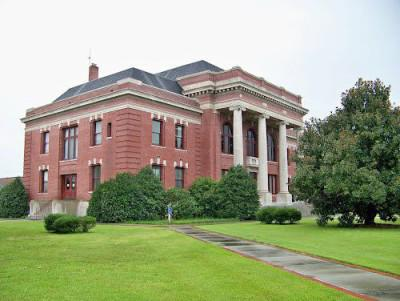
- Clarendon County Courthouse

- Seal

- Location within the U.S. state of South Carolina
- Interactive map of Clarendon County, South Carolina
- Coordinates: 33.66°N 80.22°W
- Country: United States
- State: South Carolina
- Founded: 1785
- Named for: Edward Hyde, 1st Earl of Clarendon
- Seat: Manning
- Largest community: Manning

Area
  - Total: 695.67 sq mi (1,801.8 km^{2})
  - Land: 607.21 sq mi (1,572.7 km^{2})
  - Water: 88.46 sq mi (229.1 km^{2}) 12.72%

Population (2020)
  - Estimate (2025): 31,043 ▼
- Time zone: UTC−5 (Eastern)
  - Summer (DST): UTC−4 (EDT)
- Congressional district: 6th
- Website: www.clarendoncountysc.gov

Clarendon County is a county located below the fall line in the Coastal Plain region of U.S. state of South Carolina. As of the 2020 census, its population was 31,144. Its county seat is Manning.

This area was developed for lumber and mills, including textile mills. Clarendon County boasts one of the largest man-made lakes in the United States, Lake Marion, completed in 1941 as a New Deal project. It was planned as part of a national rural electrification initiative. Since the late 20th century, the dam's generation of hydroelectric power has also stimulated economic development and industry in the region.

The South Carolina state legislature established racial segregation of public facilities by state law in the late 19th century. During the Civil Rights Movement, Clarendon County was the site of the Briggs v. Elliott trial challenging segregation of public schools. This case was one of five combined with what came to be known as Brown v. Board of Education, under which the United States Supreme Court ruled in 1954 that racial segregation of public schools was unconstitutional.

== History ==
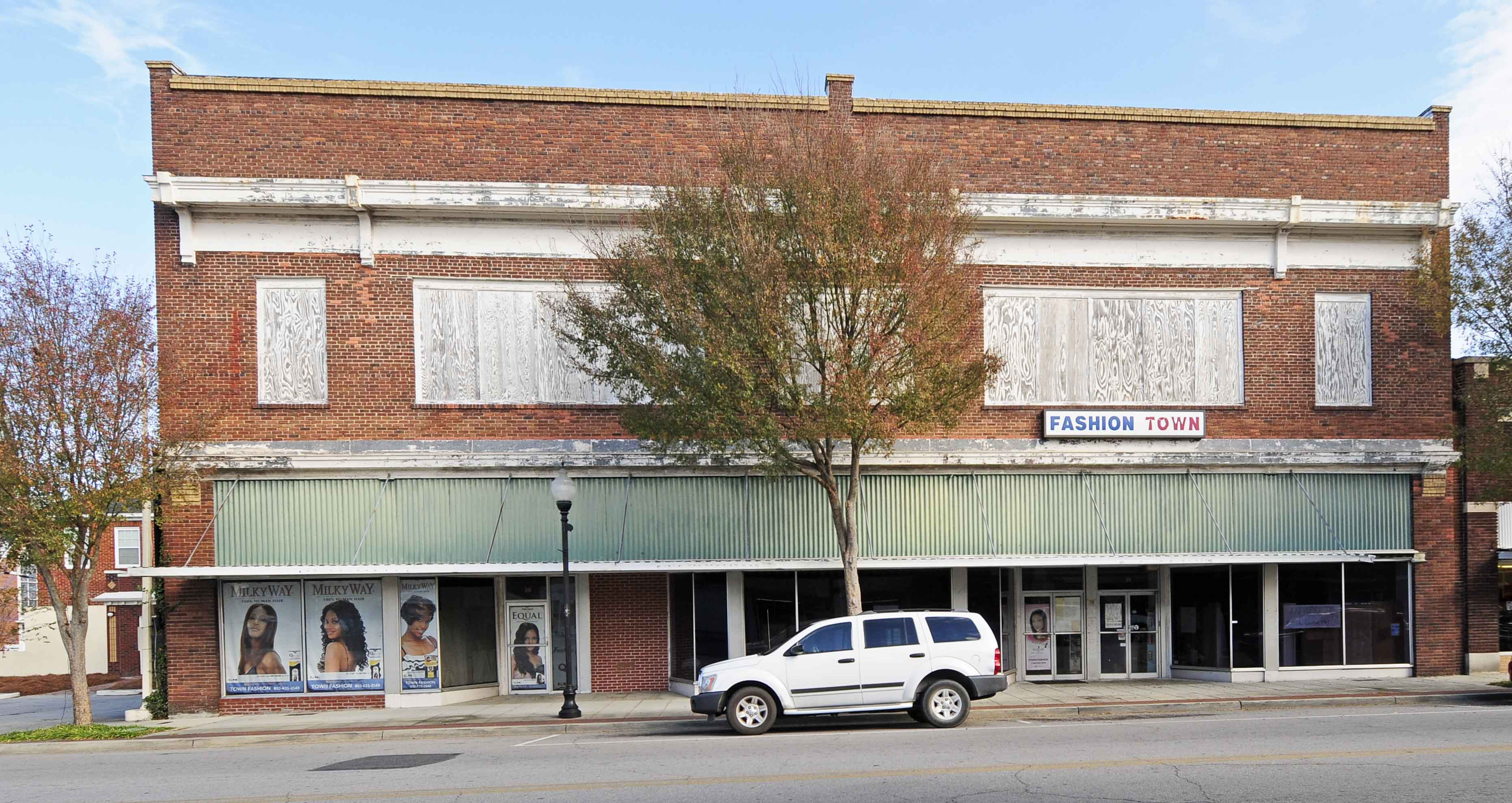
Alderman's 20 Stores in One in Manning

Clarendon County was officially established in 1785, shortly after the American Revolutionary War, when the legislature divided Camden District into seven counties. One was Clarendon County. It was named after Edward Hyde, who was a Lord Proprietor and earl of Clarendon.

During the American Revolutionary War, the Battle of Half Way Swamp was fought in December 1780. That was one of the many Revolutionary battles that took place in the area of Clarendon County. Others in this area were the following battles: Richbourg’s Mill, Nelson’s Ferry, Fort Watson/Santee Indian Mound, and Tearcoat. The Swamp Fox Murals Trail has been established as an historical landmark depicting the American Revolution and General Francis Marion, the "Swamp Fox".

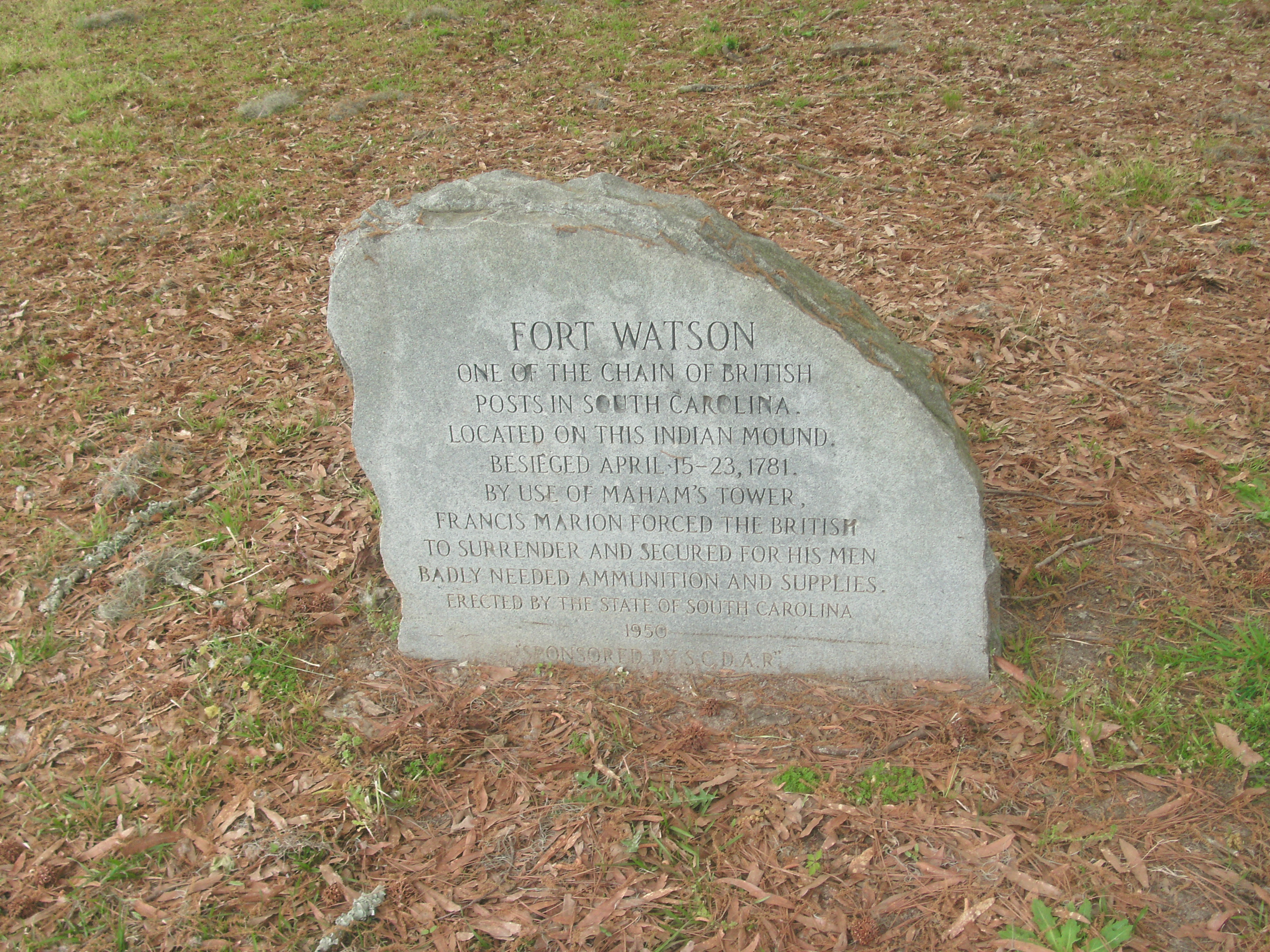
Memorial stone at the site of Fort Watson

The first European settlers in Clarendon County were ethnic French Huguenots, who traveled by boat up the Santee River. Their ancestors had earlier settled in Charleston after leaving France in the late 17th century to escape religious persecution. Transportation of goods by land was difficult, so canals were constructed to carry boat traffic around rapids in the river. The first notable canal was the Santee Canal, which was constructed in 1793. But due to the development of the railroads in the mid-1800s and construction linking major markets, the canal was superseded and ended operations some years later.

In 1798, the state legislature combined three counties - Clarendon, Claremont, and Salem - to form Sumter District for ease of administration. On December 19, 1855, a legislative act was passed establishing the Clarendon District, with the same boundaries as defined for the county in 1785. When implemented in 1787, an additional section from Sumter District was annexed – the northeast extension of Clarendon District. (The northernmost township was released to Florence County about 1888.)

During the antebellum period, the county was developed as large plantations to cultivate commodity crops, particularly short-staple cotton, by the labor of enslaved African Americans. Cultivation of this crop was made profitable by development of the cotton gin by Eli Whitney, which made processing more labor-efficient. By the time of the Civil War, the population of the county was majority black.

In 1855, Captain Joseph C. Burgess was selected to determine the geographical center of the county, the preferred location for the county seat, so that a courthouse village could be built. The commissioners decided on the site where the present courthouse was erected. Manning was developed as the county seat. Captain Burgess deeded six acres to the state, providing sites for the courthouse and jail, in addition to streets 75-feet-wide on four sides.

In 1865, toward the end of the American Civil War, a body of General Sherman's Union troops under command of General Potter raided Clarendon County. They destroyed a large portion of Manning, including the court house. The raid took place a few days before Gen. Robert E. Lee´s surrender at Appomattox. The county recovered slowly from the Civil War due to its reliance on agriculture, which suffered a long depression.

The State Constitution of 1868 renamed the districts as counties. Agriculture continued as the mainstay of the economy through much of the 19th century, and planters had to adjust to a free labor economy. They gradually relied on a system of mostly African-American tenant farmers and sharecroppers. Lumber and related mills and industries became increasingly important, with towns developed along railroad lines in the area.

Following Reconstruction, white Democrats regained control of the state legislature, passing laws for segregation of public facilities, Jim Crow and a new constitution of 1895 that effectively disfranchised most black men in the state. This exclusion from the political system was not ended until after decades of activism by African Americans, who gained passage of federal civil rights legislation in the mid-1960s to enforce their constitutional rights.

In November 1941, Lake Marion was created as a reservoir by construction of the Santee Dam by the United States Corps of Engineers. The dam was built across the Santee River to generate hydroelectric power for rural electrification, one of the major infrastructure projects initiated under President Franklin D. Roosevelt's New Deal federal investments during the Great Depression. Lake Marion and the Santee Dam were part of the Santee-Cooper Hydroelectric and Navigation Project.

Two notable court cases in Clarendon County in the mid-20th century were part of challenges by the Civil Rights Movement to racial segregation of public facilities; these cases related to segregated public schools. This was concluded in law by the United States Supreme Court ruling in Brown v. Board of Education (1954), which declared that separate but equal schools were unconstitutional. The court learned that the separate school were historically underfunded in most Southern states and seldom equal. These cases were Levi Pearson v. Clarendon County Board of Education (1947), and Briggs v. Elliott (1952).

== Geography ==
According to the U.S. Census Bureau, the county has a total area of 695.67 square miles (1,801.8 km^{2}), of which 607.21 square miles (1,572.7 km^{2}) is land and 88.46 square miles (229.1 km^{2}) (12.72%) is water.

Clarendon Country is located in the east-central portion of South Carolina, inland of the Lowcountry and bordering the southern edge of the Pee Dee. The county covers 606.94 square miles; Lake Marion, located in the southern portion of the county, covers an additional 95 square miles of the county (See Map 2). Most of the land is predominantly sand and loamy soils. Clarendon County has a moderate climate with very warm summers and mild winters. The average precipitation is 55 inches per year. The growing season is 225 days, so farmers have a long season to grow crops. Some of the major crops grown in Clarendon County are cotton, tobacco, corn and soybean.

Clarendon County is characterized by a Humid subtropical climate with hot, humid summers and cool, dry winters. The county also holds the state's records for both maximum 24-hour snowfall and largest hailstone.

=== National protected areas ===
- Bluff Unit National Wildlife Refuge
- Brown v. Board of Education National Historical Park
- Pine Island Unit National Wildlife Refuge
- Santee National Wildlife Refuge

=== State and local protected areas/sites ===
- Bennett's Bay Heritage Preserve
- Davis House
- Hickory Top Wildlife Management Area
- Manchester State Forest (part)
- Oak Lea Wildlife Management Area
- Santee Dam Wildlife Management Area
- Santee Indian Mound and Fort Watson
- Taw Caw Creek Park
- Woods Bay Heritage Preserve
- Woods Bay State Park (part)

=== Major water bodies ===
- Black River
- Congaree River
- Cooper River
- Lake Marion
- Ox Swamp
- Pocotaligo River

=== Adjacent counties ===
- Sumter County – north
- Florence County – northeast
- Williamsburg County – east
- Berkeley County – southeast
- Orangeburg County – southwest
- Calhoun County – west

=== Major highways ===
- I-95
- US 15
- US 15 Conn.
- US 52
- US 521
- US 301
- US 301 Conn. (Alcolu 1)
- US 301 Conn. (Alcolu 2)
- US 378
- SC 35
- SC 56
- SC 260
- SC 261
- SC 527

== Demographics ==
Historical population
Census	Pop.	Note	%±
1860	13,095		—
1870	14,038		7.2%
1880	19,190		36.7%
1890	23,233		21.1%
1900	28,184		21.3%
1910	32,188		14.2%
1920	34,878		8.4%
1930	30,036		−13.9%
1940	31,500		4.9%
1950	32,215		2.3%
1960	29,490		−8.5%
1970	25,604		−13.2%
1980	27,464		7.3%
1990	28,450		3.6%
2000	32,502		14.2%
2010	34,971		7.6%
2020	31,144		−10.9%
2025 (est.)	31,043	▼	−0.3%
U.S. Decennial Census; 1790–1960 1900–1990; 1990–2000 2010 2020

=== 2020 census ===
As of the 2020 census, there were 31,144 people, 12,610 households, and 8,817 families residing in the county. The median age was 47.1 years, with 19.6% of residents under the age of 18 and 24.8% aged 65 or older. For every 100 females there were 96.8 males, and for every 100 females age 18 and over there were 94.5 males age 18 and over.

14.5% of residents lived in urban areas, while 85.5% lived in rural areas.

The racial makeup of the county was 49.7% White, 44.7% Black or African American, 0.4% American Indian and Alaska Native, 0.7% Asian, 0.0% Native Hawaiian and Pacific Islander, 1.7% from some other race, and 2.7% from two or more races. Hispanic or Latino residents of any race comprised 2.9% of the population.

Among the 12,610 households, 26.4% had children under the age of 18 living with them and 34.5% had a female householder with no spouse or partner present. About 30.5% of all households were made up of individuals and 15.9% had someone living alone who was 65 years of age or older. There were 15,816 housing units, of which 20.3% were vacant; among occupied units, 74.4% were owner-occupied and 25.6% were renter-occupied. The homeowner vacancy rate was 2.2% and the rental vacancy rate was 7.6%.

=== Racial and ethnic composition ===
Clarendon County, South Carolina – Racial and ethnic composition Note: the US Census treats Hispanic/Latino as an ethnic category. This table excludes Latinos from the racial categories and assigns them to a separate category. Hispanics/Latinos may be of any race.
Race / Ethnicity (NH = Non-Hispanic)	Pop 1980	Pop 1990	Pop 2000	Pop 2010	Pop 2020	% 1980	% 1990	% 2000	% 2010	% 2020
White alone (NH)	11,576	12,223	14,449	16,160	15,309	42.15%	42.96%	44.46%	46.21%	49.16%
Black or African American alone (NH)	15,364	16,021	17,193	17,379	13,821	55.94%	56.31%	52.90%	49.70%	44.38%
Native American or Alaska Native alone (NH)	5	31	61	71	120	0.02%	0.11%	0.19%	0.20%	0.39%
Asian alone (NH)	25	27	82	222	225	0.09%	0.09%	0.25%	0.63%	0.72%
Native Hawaiian or Pacific Islander alone (NH)	x	x	2	4	8	x	x	0.01%	0.01%	0.03%
Other race alone (NH)	4	4	10	7	73	0.01%	0.01%	0.03%	0.02%	0.23%
Mixed race or Multiracial (NH)	x	x	145	229	681	x	x	0.45%	0.65%	2.19%
Hispanic or Latino (any race)	490	144	560	899	907	1.78%	0.51%	1.72%	2.57%	2.91%
Total	27,464	28,450	32,502	34,971	31,144	100.00%	100.00%	100.00%	100.00%	100.00%

=== 2010 census ===
At the 2010 census, there were 34,971 people, 13,132 households, and 9,238 families living in the county. The population density was 57.6 inhabitants per square mile (22.2/km^{2}). There were 17,467 housing units at an average density of 28.8 per square mile (11.1/km^{2}). The racial makeup of the county was 50.1% black or African American, 47.0% white, 0.6% Asian, 0.2% American Indian, 1.2% from other races, and 0.8% from two or more races. Those of Hispanic or Latino origin made up 2.6% of the population. In terms of ancestry, 12.2% were American, 6.8% were Irish, and 5.0% were English.

Of the 13,132 households, 31.7% had children under the age of 18 living with them, 45.1% were married couples living together, 20.6% had a female householder with no husband present, 29.7% were non-families, and 26.1% of all households were made up of individuals. The average household size was 2.54 and the average family size was 3.04. The median age was 41.4 years.

The median income for a household in the county was $33,066 and the median income for a family was $40,492. Males had a median income of $31,860 versus $26,851 for females. The per capita income for the county was $16,562. About 17.5% of families and 23.0% of the population were below the poverty line, including 36.3% of those under age 18 and 13.8% of those age 65 or over.

=== 2000 census ===
At the 2000 census, there were 34,971 people living in the county. 50.4% were Black or African American, 44.0% White, 0.6% Asian, 0.2% Native American, 1.2% of some other race and 0.8% of two or more races. 2.6% were Hispanic or Latino (of any race).

The population has only slightly increased since 1920; only 20 percent compared to 71 percent for South Carolina. From 1920 to 1930 and from 1950 to 1970, there were significant declines in population, 16 percent and 26 percent, respectively. In part these declines reflected the Great Migration of African Americans out of the South, to seek better jobs, education and living opportunities.

As seen in the Table, the growing majority of the population of Clarendon County is Black or African American (50.4%). This reflects historic settlement patterns when the area had been developed for commodity agriculture and large plantations. In the 21st century, 27.9 percent of the State of South Carolina is Black or African; White or Caucasians comprise 45 percent of the population in Clarendon County and 60 percent in South Carolina, respectively.

In regard to education, 13.4% of the population had bachelor's degree, which is approximately 10% less than the state of South Carolina. There is a higher percentage of elderly, aged 65 and older, in Clarendon County in comparison to South Carolina, 17.6% and 14.1%, respectively. The population of Clarendon County is stationary in the area; more than 90% of the population has been living in the same house for at least a year. The median household income is $33,355, approximately $10,000 less than the median for the State of South Carolina.

== Government and politics ==
Clarendon County was once, like most of the Deep South, a Democratic stronghold at the beginning of the 20th century. The county became considerably more competitive following the end of World War II, with Republican candidate Dwight D. Eisenhower obtaining 68.5% in 1952, up from a mere 1% in 1948 for the Republican Party. However, after Jimmy Carter swept the Deep South and Clarendon in 1976, the county became a Democratic stronghold once again but by much narrower margins than at the beginning of the century, consistently hovering above the 50% marker by only a handful of digits until the 2020 election when Republican candidate Donald Trump became the first Republican candidate to win the county since Richard Nixon in 1972 by a narrow 111 vote margin. Trump would win Clarendon again in 2024, this time by a margin of over 12%.

United States presidential election results for Clarendon County, South Carolina
Year	Republican		Democratic		Third party(ies)	
Year	No.	%	No.	%	No.	%
1888	331	18.56%	1,452	81.44%	0	0.00%
1892	364	14.24%	2,192	85.76%	0	0.00%
1896	207	12.49%	1,450	87.51%	0	0.00%
1900	83	6.84%	1,130	93.16%	0	0.00%
1904	86	6.85%	1,170	93.15%	0	0.00%
1908	32	2.85%	1,091	97.15%	0	0.00%
1912	0	0.00%	932	96.68%	32	3.32%
1916	18	1.97%	894	98.03%	0	0.00%
1920	0	0.00%	902	100.00%	0	0.00%
1924	20	3.14%	615	96.70%	1	0.16%
1928	10	1.30%	762	98.70%	0	0.00%
1932	25	2.53%	962	97.47%	0	0.00%
1936	17	1.33%	1,260	98.67%	0	0.00%
1940	54	4.47%	1,154	95.53%	0	0.00%
1944	27	2.09%	1,053	81.69%	209	16.21%
1948	16	1.01%	107	6.73%	1,467	92.26%
1952	2,073	68.51%	953	31.49%	0	0.00%
1956	224	8.38%	661	24.74%	1,787	66.88%
1960	1,445	56.03%	1,134	43.97%	0	0.00%
1964	2,960	78.06%	832	21.94%	0	0.00%
1968	2,201	27.85%	3,606	45.62%	2,097	26.53%
1972	3,958	54.34%	3,276	44.98%	50	0.69%
1976	3,040	35.52%	5,489	64.13%	30	0.35%
1980	4,158	40.79%	5,979	58.65%	57	0.56%
1984	5,102	47.48%	5,591	52.03%	53	0.49%
1988	4,337	46.15%	5,030	53.53%	30	0.32%
1992	4,147	37.89%	6,033	55.12%	765	6.99%
1996	3,841	37.66%	5,930	58.15%	427	4.19%
2000	5,186	45.93%	5,999	53.14%	105	0.93%
2004	6,061	45.92%	7,087	53.69%	52	0.39%
2008	6,758	43.45%	8,673	55.77%	121	0.78%
2012	7,071	43.40%	9,091	55.80%	130	0.80%
2016	7,386	47.98%	7,732	50.22%	277	1.80%
2020	8,361	49.97%	8,250	49.30%	122	0.73%
2024	9,065	55.55%	7,064	43.28%	191	1.17%

== Economy ==
In 2022, the GDP in Clarendon County was $754.2 million (roughly $24,326 per capita). The real GDP was $619.9 million (approx. $19,996 per capita) in chained 2017 dollars. The unemployment rate in the county has fluctuated between 3.2-5% throughout 2022-2024.

The City of Manning, Clarendon County School District, Helena Chemical (a division of Marubeni), McLeod Health, and Walmart are some of the largest employers in Clarendon County as of April 2024.

Employment and Wage Statistics by Industry in Clarendon County, South Carolina
Industry	Employment Counts	Employment Percentage (%)	Average Annual Wage ($)
Accommodation and Food Services	731	10.3	16,068
Administrative and Support and Waste Management and Remediation Services	311	4.4	45,760
Agriculture, Forestry, Fishing and Hunting	186	2.6	41,028
Arts, Entertainment, and Recreation	49	0.7	21,268
Construction	123	1.7	45,864
Educational Services	631	8.9	39,260
Finance and Insurance	183	2.6	51,948
Health Care and Social Assistance	1,396	19.7	42,380
Information	26	0.4	59,800
Manufacturing	552	7.8	44,356
Other Services (except Public Administration)	229	3.2	30,212
Professional, Scientific, and Technical Services	183	2.6	91,520
Public Administration	803	11.3	47,424
Real Estate and Rental and Leasing	22	0.3	33,748
Retail Trade	1,199	16.9	32,188
Transportation and Warehousing	113	1.6	52,312
Utilities	59	0.8	47,528
Wholesale Trade	300	4.2	56,108
Total	7,096	100.0%	40,361

== Natural resources ==
Clarendon County has abundant groundwater resources of good quality. The Department of Natural Resources report on the groundwater resources in Clarendon suggests that the county is in a fortunate position to obtain adequate water for domestic and public supplies, industry, and irrigation. Water is obtained chiefly from sand aquifers in the Black Creek and Middendorf Formations.

Quantities obtainable from wells are adequate for public supplies, industrial uses, and irrigation. Well yields as great as 1,500 gallons per minute are obtained, and many wells can produce more than 100 gallons per minute. The water is of good quality, being soft and low in mineral content. There are five public water supply systems in Clarendon County. In 2008 the systems had the following pumpage rates, in millions of gallons per day:

- Alcolu Water System—0.05
- Barrineau Water System—0.09
- Manning—1.07
- Summerton—0.33
- Turbeville—0.30

== Activities ==
Activities include boating, fishing, hiking, hunting and golfing.

Lake Marion is the site of several professional bass fishing tournaments, including the Citgo/Bassmasters Tournament and the Wal-Mart/FLW tour. Reader’s Digest magazine rated Lake Marion as one of “America’s 100 Best” for fishing, notably for the lake’s catfish. The county is known for its championship-level catches of striped bass.

Hunting is also available in Clarendon County. Deer, turkey and other small game is available. Several sporting clay operations and gun ranges are located throughout the county, as well as hunting preserves.

== Media ==
- The Manning Times – publishes weekly on Thursday; founded in 1882.
- The Clarendon Citizen – news site available online.

== Culture ==
The Cultural Arts Center in Summerton and Weldon Auditorium in Manning offer space for cultural and artistic showcases.

== Communities ==
=== City ===
- Manning (county seat and largest community)

=== Towns ===
- Paxville
- Summerton
- Turbeville

=== Census-designated places ===
- Alcolu
- Foreston
- North Santee
- Wyboo

=== Unincorporated communities ===
- Davis Station
- Gable
- New Zion
- Rimini
- Sardinia
- Silver
- Wilson

== Education ==
School districts include:

- Clarendon School District 1
- Clarendon School District 2
- Clarendon School District 3

== Notable people ==
- Bertie Bowman (1931–2023), U.S. congressional staffer
- Marie Deans (1940–2011), Anti-death penalty activist
- Joseph Armstrong DeLaine (1898–1974), Methodist pastor, principal and civil rights activist
- Althea Gibson (1927–2003), first African-American woman to win a grand slam tennis title
- John C. Land III (born 1941), long-serving South Carolina state senator (district 36; 1976–2013)
- John Lawrence Manning (1816–1889), 65th governor of South Carolina (1852-1854)
- Richard Irvine Manning I (1789–1836), legislator and 50th governor of South Carolina (1824–1826)
- Marian McKnight (born 1936), Miss America 1957 & wife of actor Gary Conway
- Peggy Parish (1927–1988), author of the Amelia Bedelia children's book series
- James Burchill Richardson (1770–1836), 41st governor of South Carolina (1802-1804)
- John Peter Richardson II (1801–1864), legislator and 59th governor of South Carolina (1840–1842)
- John Peter Richardson III (1831–1899), legislator and 83rd governor of South Carolina (1886–1890)
- Richard Richardson (1704–1780), military brigadier general, enslaver and legislator
- George Stinney Jr. (1929–1944), the youngest American to be sentenced to death and executed. His conviction was overturned posthumously in 2014.
- Rob Thomas (born 1972-living), lead singer of Matchbox Twenty

== See also ==
- List of counties in South Carolina
- National Register of Historic Places listings in Clarendon County, South Carolina
