= Brown v. Board of Education National Historical Park =

National Historic Site of the United States in Topeka, Kansas

- Location within Kansas Location within the United States
- Location: Topeka, Kansas, and Summerton, South Carolina, United States
- Nearest city: Topeka, Kansas
- Coordinates: 39°02′17″N 95°40′35″W
- Area: 1.85 acres (0.75 ha)
- Established: October 26, 1992
- Visitors: 17,860 (in 2025)
- Governing body: National Park Service
- Website: https://www.nps.gov/brvb/
- Brown v. Board of Education National Historic Site
- U.S. National Register of Historic Places
- Location: 1515 SE Monroe St, Topeka, Kansas
- NRHP reference No.: 01000156
- Added to NRHP: October 26, 1992

Brown v. Board of Education National Historical Park was established in Topeka, Kansas, on October 26, 1992, by the United States Congress to commemorate the landmark decision of the U.S. Supreme Court in the case Brown v. Board of Education aimed at ending racial segregation in public schools. On May 17, 1954, the Supreme Court unanimously declared that "separate educational facilities are inherently unequal" and, as such, violated the Fourteenth Amendment to the United States Constitution, which guarantees all citizens "equal protection of the laws."

The National Historical Park consists of Monroe Elementary School, one of the four segregated elementary schools for African American children in Topeka, and the adjacent grounds. It was originally known as Brown v. Board of Education National Historic Site until it was redesignated and expanded on May 13, 2022. The Park will also include Summerton High School and Scott's Branch High School in Summerton, South Carolina, upon acquisition of property. Five additional schools were authorized as affiliated areas of the National Park Service: Robert Russa Moton School in Farmville, Virginia; Howard High School in Wilmington, Delaware; Claymont High School in Claymont, Delaware; Hockessin Colored School #107 in Hockessin, Delaware; and John Philip Sousa Junior High School in Washington, D.C. The National Park Service will not own these sites but will provide financial and technical assistance to exhibit their history.

The Brown v. Board of Education case was consolidated with four other cases on school segregation: Briggs v. Elliott (filed in South Carolina), Davis v. County School Board of Prince Edward County (filed in Virginia), Gebhart v. Belton (filed in Delaware), and Bolling v. Sharpe (filed in Washington, D.C.). Inclusion of the history of these schools will show a broader story of educational racism and the legal fight against it.

== History of the Topeka site ==
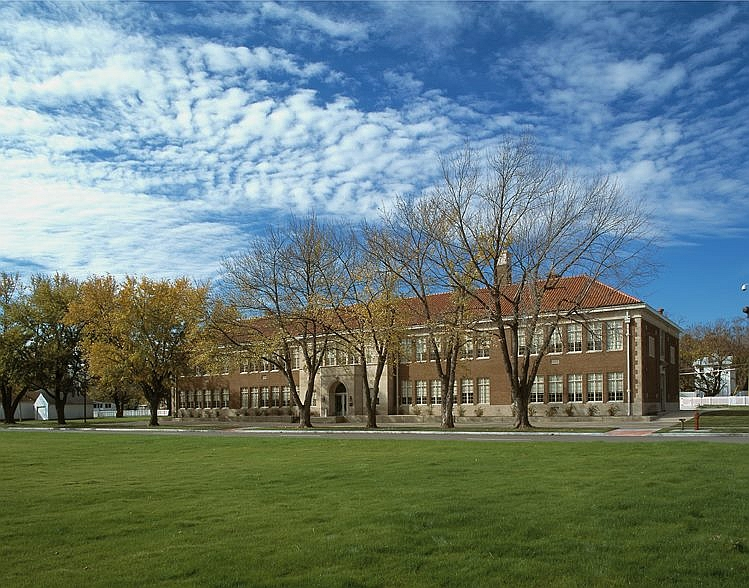
Monroe Elementary, the school to which Linda Brown was bussed

The story of Monroe Elementary begins long before the Brown decision. In 1855, John Ritchie, an abolitionist, bought 160 acres (65 ha) from Jacob Chase in Topeka, Kansas. After the Civil War a number of newly freed African Americans came to Topeka and built homes on this land. Due to the sizable African American population, the school board decided to establish a school for black children in the neighborhood. "Ritchie's Addition" became the site of Monroe School. After Ritchie's death in 1887, the land was purchased by the Topeka Board of Education to build a school for African American children.

The current building is actually the third Monroe school to sit on the corner of Fifteenth and Monroe streets. The first school was located in a small rented building used from 1868 until a permanent structure was erected in 1874. The current building was constructed in 1926 immediately south of the old school. It was one of many schools in Topeka designed by the prominent Topeka architect Thomas W. Williamson between 1920 and 1935. His firm, Williamson and Co., was hired by the Topeka Board of Education to design a series of progressive schools. Monroe Elementary School is a two-story brick and limestone building in the Italian Renaissance Revival style. The building was made with some of the best materials and the most modern technology of the time.

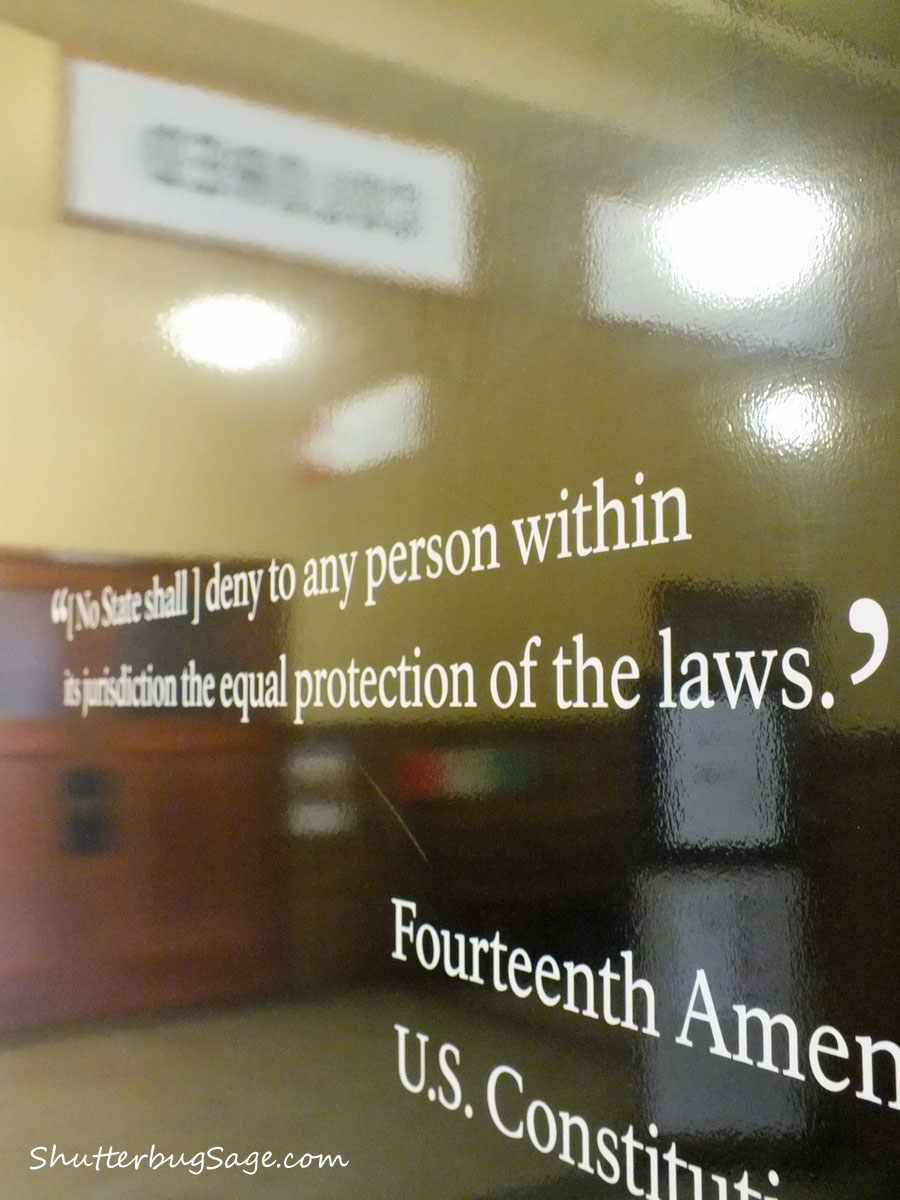
Quote from the 14th Amendment just inside the Monroe School entrance. The "Colored" and "White" signs from the segregationist era are reflected in the Amendment.

In a 2004 interview for PBS station KTWU, one of the teachers from Monroe, Barbara Ross, recalled:

I feel they were good schools. They had qualified black teachers ... very qualified. Many people ... well, I'll say some people ... felt that the supplies and things that were furnished in the buildings were not comparable with those in the white schools only because they were probably older buildings. They had the same books and we've heard a lot of things about that. But they had the same books that the others had because so many of the black teachers were on the committees to select the books—the textbooks. So we know we had the same books that they did. It's true—everything wasn't just right because the things in the community weren't just right. We couldn't go eat any place. We couldn't go to the theater and sit any place. We couldn't live in an apartment or go to a motel; we had to stay with a black family when we came here to teach.

Monroe was the newest of the four segregated schools serving Topeka's African American community. The other schools were Buchanan, McKinley, and Washington. Washington no longer stands and the Topeka Board of Education no longer owns the remaining schools.

In the Brown case, the legal opinion was not that the schools for black children in Kansas were qualitatively worse in construction, books, etc. than the schools for white children. Instead, the opinion was that school segregation by itself was an unfair detriment to the education of black children. The holding that "separate" by itself was unconstitutional was what made Brown the landmark case in school desegregation. From the decision:

Does segregation of children in public schools solely on the basis of race, even though the physical facilities and other "tangible" factors may be equal, deprive the children of the minority group of equal educational opportunities? We believe that it does.

=== Changing ownership ===
Brown v. Board of Education National Historical Park
- Long title: An Act to provide for the establishment of the Brown v. Board of Education National Historic Site in the State of Kansas, and for other purposes.
- Enacted by: the 102nd United States Congress
- Effective: October 26, 1992

Citations
- Public law: Pub. L. 102–525
- Statutes at Large: 106 Stat. 3438

Codification
- Titles amended: Title 16—Conservation
- U.S.C. sections created: 16 U.S.C. §§ 410iiii–410iiii-6

Legislative history
- Introduced in the Senate as S. 2890 by Bob Dole (R–KS) on June 24, 1992; Committee consideration by Senate Energy and Natural Resources; Passed the Senate on October 1, 1992; Passed the House on October 6, 1992 with amendment; Senate agreed to House amendment on October 8, 1992 (voice vote); Signed into law by President George H. W. Bush on October 26, 1992

Monroe School was closed in 1975 due to declining enrollment. The school district utilized the school building as a warehouse and the grounds for parking buses and performing vehicle maintenance. Eventually the school and grounds were sold to private owners. Monroe Elementary remained in private ownership for more than fifteen years. Richard Appelhans and Richard L. Plush Jr. intended to convert the school to offices or a private school, but they instead sold it in 1982. The new owner was the Church of the Nazarene which used the property as a community outreach program center and meeting place. The next owner, Mark A. Stueve, President of S/S Builders purchased the school from the church in 1988 for use as a warehouse. In 1990, Stueve announced his intention to auction the building off.

The Brown Foundation began a crusade to save Monroe Elementary School from being sold. After a series of letter writing campaigns and meetings with local Congressional leadership and the Trust for Public Land the school was secured. The Trust for Public Land purchased the property in 1991 and it was added to the National Historic Landmark nomination for the Sumner Elementary School, listed in 1987. On October 26, 1992, President George H. W. Bush signed legislation establishing Brown v. Board of Education National Historic Site. The title was transferred to the National Park Service in December 1993.

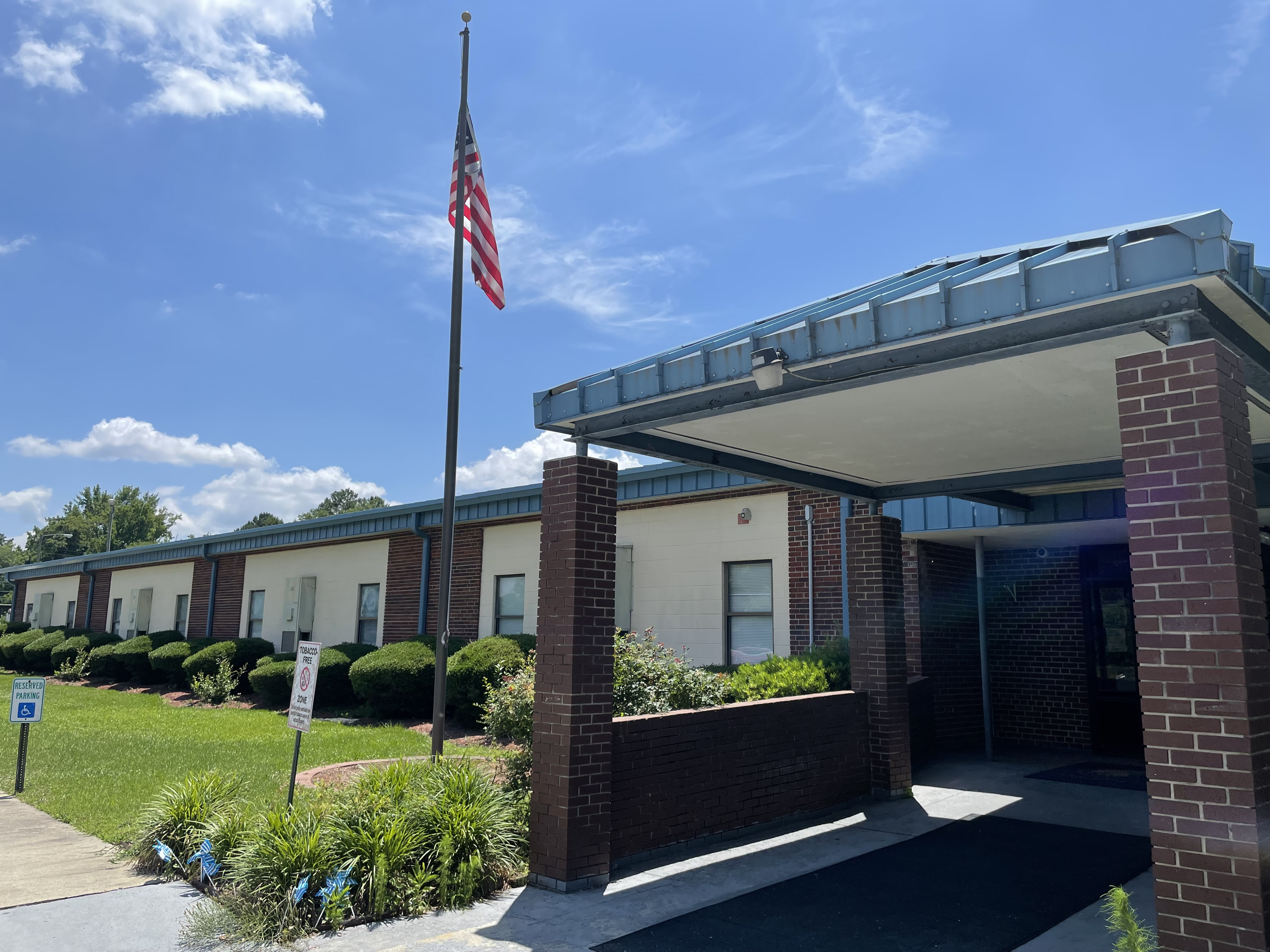
Scott's Branch High School

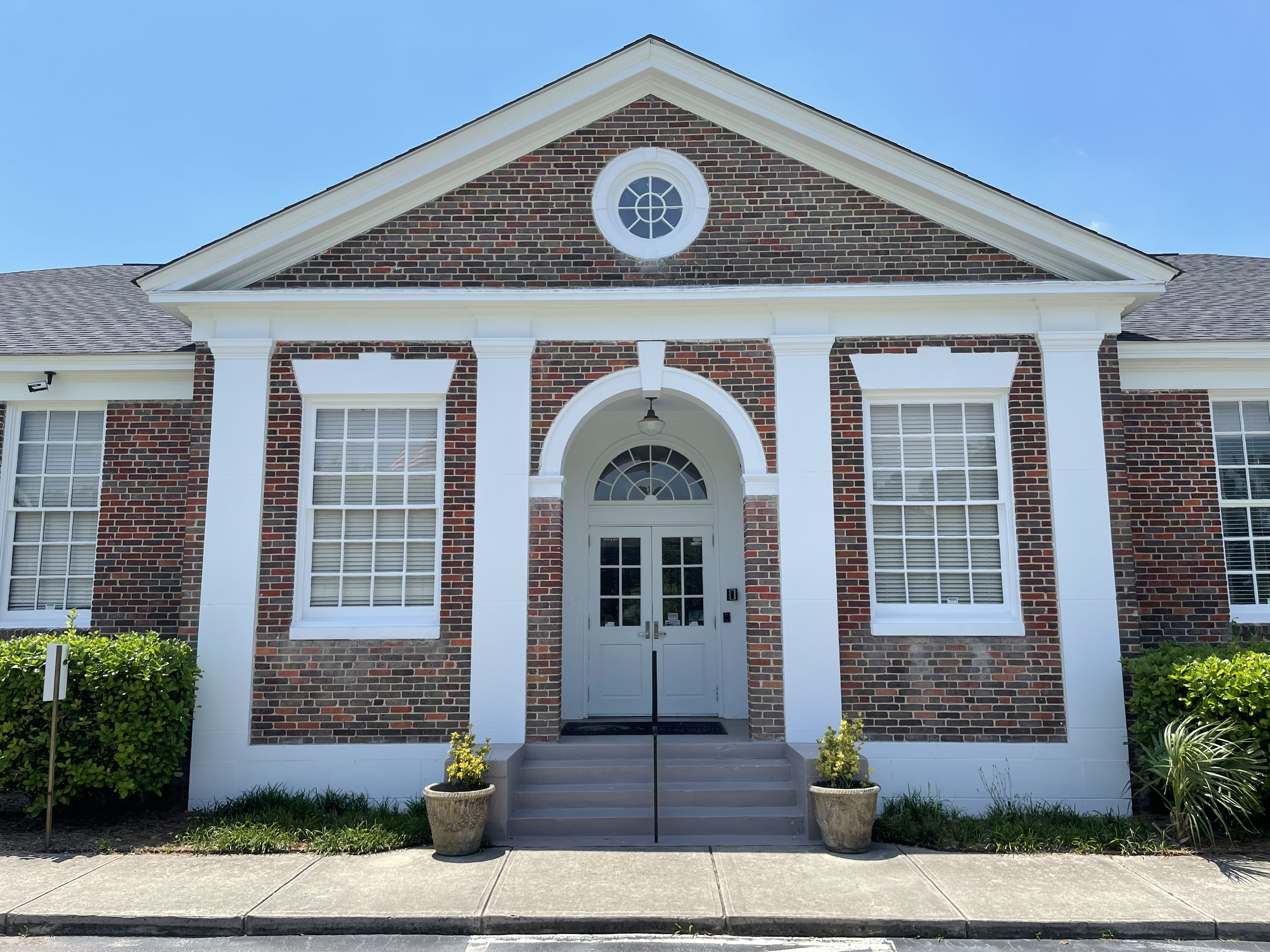
Summerton Hight School

== South Carolina sites ==
Summerton High School was an all-white school that refused to admit Black students, who had to attend Scott's Branch High School, which was built in 1951 to purportedly provide a comparable educational environment for African American students. The inequality between them was challenged in the Briggs v. Elliott case which was consolidated with Brown v. Board.

== Affiliated areas ==
The designation of these sites as affiliated areas of the National Park Service is pending identification of an "appropriate management entity" for each site, as of May 2023.

- Robert Russa Moton School in Farmville, Virginia
- Howard High School in Wilmington, Delaware
- Claymont High School in Claymont, Delaware
- Hockessin Colored School #107 in Hockessin, Delaware
- John Philip Sousa Junior High School in Washington, D.C.
