= Gardner Bishop =

American civil rights activist (1909-1992)

Gardner LaClede Bishop

Personal details
- Born: January 20, 1909 Rocky Mount, North Carolina
- Died: November 25, 1992 (aged 83) Washington, D.C.
- Spouse: Ethel Crutchfield Bishop
- Profession: Barber, activist

Gardner L. Bishop was a barber and civil rights activist in Washington, D.C. His work for equal schools for black and white children in the 1940s and 1950s included organizing the student strike at Browne Junior High School and contributing to the historic Bolling v. Sharpe case that made school segregation unconstitutional in the District. Bishop, originally from North Carolina, was known for his outspokenness and his drive to end elitism in the black community.

== Personal information ==
=== Life ===
Gardner LaClede Bishop was a barber and activist remembered for his contributions to the school integration movement in the District of Columbia in the 1940s and 1950s. He was born on January 20, 1909, in Rocky Mount, North Carolina.^{[1]} He learned how to express his opinions early on, winning prizes as a high school debater in his home state. Although he attended a year of college at Shaw University in Raleigh, North Carolina, he did not graduate. In 1930 he moved to Washington, D.C.^{[2]} He lived east of the Anacostia River and, like his father, began working as a barber.^{[3]} After challenging the comments of racist customers on multiple occasions, he was fired. Not cowed, he opened B&D Barber Shop at 1515 U Street NW in 1940, which he owned and operated through his retirement in 1985. His black clientele could get both "a haircut and an earful" from the "barber of U Street."^{[4]} He was a member of the Presbyterian Church and was married for 58 years to Ethel Crutchfield Bishop, who died in 1989. They had three children: Dr. Judine Bishop Johnson, Anita Harley, and Gardner L. Bishop Jr. He died of kidney failure on November 25, 1992, at age 82.^{[5]}

=== More than just Black and White ===
Bishop focused not only on the inequalities between black schools and white schools, but also on the differences between upper and lower class black schools and attitudes. He was appalled by the snobbishness of the elite black Washingtonians. Part of his motivation for organizing a strike at Browne Junior High School came from his rebuffed requests to transfer his daughter to Banneker Junior High. Middle class black officials informed him that because he was only a barber, his daughter could not go to Banneker, a school meant for the middle class. This rebuke infuriated Bishop, and fueled his mistrust of some of the activist organizations he saw as furthering the agendas of the upper classes of society, including the NAACP. Bishop verbalized his sense of frustration and oppression, saying, "We were on the bottom shelf. I’m black and I’m poor, so I’m segregated twice."^{[6]}

== The fight against segregated schools ==
=== Overcrowded schools ===
When Bishop came to the nation's capital, the public school system was segregated, and the facilities for black children and white children were far from equal. As the population of the city expanded in the post World War II years, the schools, particularly the black schools, became overcrowded.^{[7]} Between 1930 and 1950 the African American population alone doubled to 280,000 people, about 35% of D.C.'s total population.^{[8]} The shifting demographics of the city, with whites fleeing to the suburbs and the proportion of the black population steadily increasing, led to an unequal distribution of students amongst the available facilities. Taxes were allocated to fund black schools and white schools based on population statistics collected in the decennial census, so by the end of the 1940s the black schools were receiving far less than their fair share of tax dollars based on the numbers of black children enrolled because of the outdated census data.^{[9]}

The situation at Browne Junior High School exemplified the failure of the school system to educate its constituents. By the late 1940s, Browne was operating at double its intended capacity. To accommodate the inflated student body, the school adopted a schedule of shifts that resulted in students receiving only 4 and a half hours of schooling per day. Because the law required that students attend school for a minimum of six hours per day, this restriction was particularly galling to parents.^{[10]} In an attempt to remedy the situation, which many people objected to, the school implemented the use of two abandoned white elementary schools, Blow and Webb. With this plan 1146 students would move between Browne, Blow and Webb to receive a full day of instruction, and the other 680 students would continue with the shortened school day.^{[11]} To make matters worse, nearby white schools were operating under capacity and had plenty of room to accommodate more students.^{[12]}

=== Consolidated Parents Group ===
Gardner Bishop was unwilling to accept a substandard education for his children. His oldest daughter, Judine, attended Browne in 1947.^{[13]} He was outraged by the use of schools that whites had abandoned, not to mention the long walks that students had to take in the middle of their school day to move to a different building. Bishop did not see this shifting schedule as an acceptable solution to the overcrowding. He and other disgruntled parents began holding meetings at Jones Memorial Church to discuss how to present their grievances to the school board. They eventually became known as the Consolidated Parents Group.^{[14]} Bishop took charge as the most visible and vocal member of the group, but came to rely on a set of leaders within the group that grew to have hundreds of members. With Bishop as president, there were two vice presidents, Marie W. Smith and Burma Whitted, a secretary, Unity T. Macklin, and a treasurer, James Haley Sr. At one of their first meetings they voted to stage a student "sit-out" to boycott the situation at Browne Junior High School.^{[15]}

The boycott started on December 3, 1947. For two months, parents of Browne students refused to send their children to school. They picketed outside the school and the Board of Education offices at the Franklin Administration Building, protesting the insufficient resources being provided for their students. Eventually, due to pressure from the conservative black community and dwindling support, the boycott partially ended. The students returned to Browne but the boycott of Blow and Webb continued. When the boycott did come to an end on February 3, 1948, the Board of Education began using five school buildings so students would not have to switch buildings and could attend a full day of school.^{[16]}

== Bolling v. Sharpe ==
Bishop's organizational efforts did not stop at Browne. In 1949, he took a group of black students to the newly opened Sousa Junior High School, a school for whites with many amenities. The students were given a tour, but they were not allowed to enroll. This incident resulted in a lawsuit, with Spotswood Bolling, one of the students on the tour, as a plaintiff. The case was later argued in front of the Supreme Court with four other cases as part of the historic Brown v. Board of Education decision. Bolling v. Sharpe was unique because it introduced the argument that segregation itself was unconstitutional. Additionally, the NAACP was not involved in the Bolling case because of Bishop's continued suspicion of middle class black organizations.^{[17]}

== Legacy ==
Bishop's activism made an impact because his efforts were broad yet focused. He targeted specific injustices in the school system on a variety of fronts. The strike made a social statement and allowed people to see the problem up close. The court case attacked segregation from a legal standpoint, aimed at changing the laws themselves. In addition, Bishop wrote Letters to the Editor of the Washington Post, on topics including school buildings and high school capacity, putting his arguments into print.^{[18]} ^{[19]} He was determined to ensure that whites did not become complacent because of the concessions allowed for middle class blacks in the school system. He worked for the lowest members of society, those whose voices and rights were consistently ignored by the established powers. Although Gardner Bishop was not the most prominent civil rights activist of his time, he serves as a reminder that no matter what background people come from, if they speak their minds and fight for what they believe in they can leave a lasting impact. Gardner Bishop Elementary School will open in Capitol Hill in fall 2027.
