= Joseph DeLaine =

American civil rights leader and Methodist minister

Joseph Armstrong De Laine
- Born: July 2, 1898; Manning, South Carolina
- Died: August 3, 1974 (aged 76)
- Education: Allen University (B.A. 1931)
- Occupations: African Methodist Episcopal minister and teacher
- Known for: Civil rights

Joseph Armstrong "J. A." De Laine (July 2, 1898 – August 3, 1974) was an African Methodist Episcopal Church minister and civil rights leader from Clarendon County, South Carolina. De Laine worked with Modjeska Simkins and the South Carolina NAACP on the case Briggs v. Elliott, which challenged segregation in Summerton, South Carolina. The case was consolidated into the U.S. Supreme Court decision usually cited as Brown v. Board of Education.

== Career ==
De Laine received a B.A. from Allen University in 1931, working as a laborer and running a dry-cleaning business to pay for his education.

In the aftermath of the Brown v. Board of Education decision in 1954, De Laine and his family came under pressure to leave Lake City. Things finally came to a head on the night of October 10, 1955, when several men in a car shot at the St. James A.M.E. Church parsonage, which De Laine and his family called home. De Laine returned fire, but then decided to flee the state. The next day, a warrant was filed for his arrest for assault and battery with a deadly weapon. He fled first to New York City and then to Buffalo, New York, where he founded another Methodist church which he named the DeLaine-Waring AME Church, in honor of the Federal District Judge Waties Waring. As a result of efforts begun in 1955, De Laine was pardoned in 2000 by the South Carolina State Parole Board.

De Laine also memorably taught school in South Carolina, and in 2006 was inducted into South Carolina's Educational Hall of Honor at the University of South Carolina.

Rev. De Laine, Harry and Eliza Briggs, and Levi Pearson, key figures in the Briggs v. Elliott case, were awarded Congressional gold medals in 2003 "in recognition of their contributions to the National as pioneers in the effort to desegregate public schools."

== In popular culture ==
Playwright Loften Mitchell wrote a 1963 play based on De Laine's story titled Land Beyond the River.

Actor Ossie Davis also wrote a short play, The People of Clarendon County, which starred himself, his wife, Ruby Dee, and Sidney Poitier. It was featured, as was the case predating Brown v. Board of Education in which De Laine played an important role, in Alice Bernstein's illustrated book with the same title.
