= Modjeska Monteith Simkins House =

Historic house in South Carolina, United States

- U.S. National Register of Historic Places
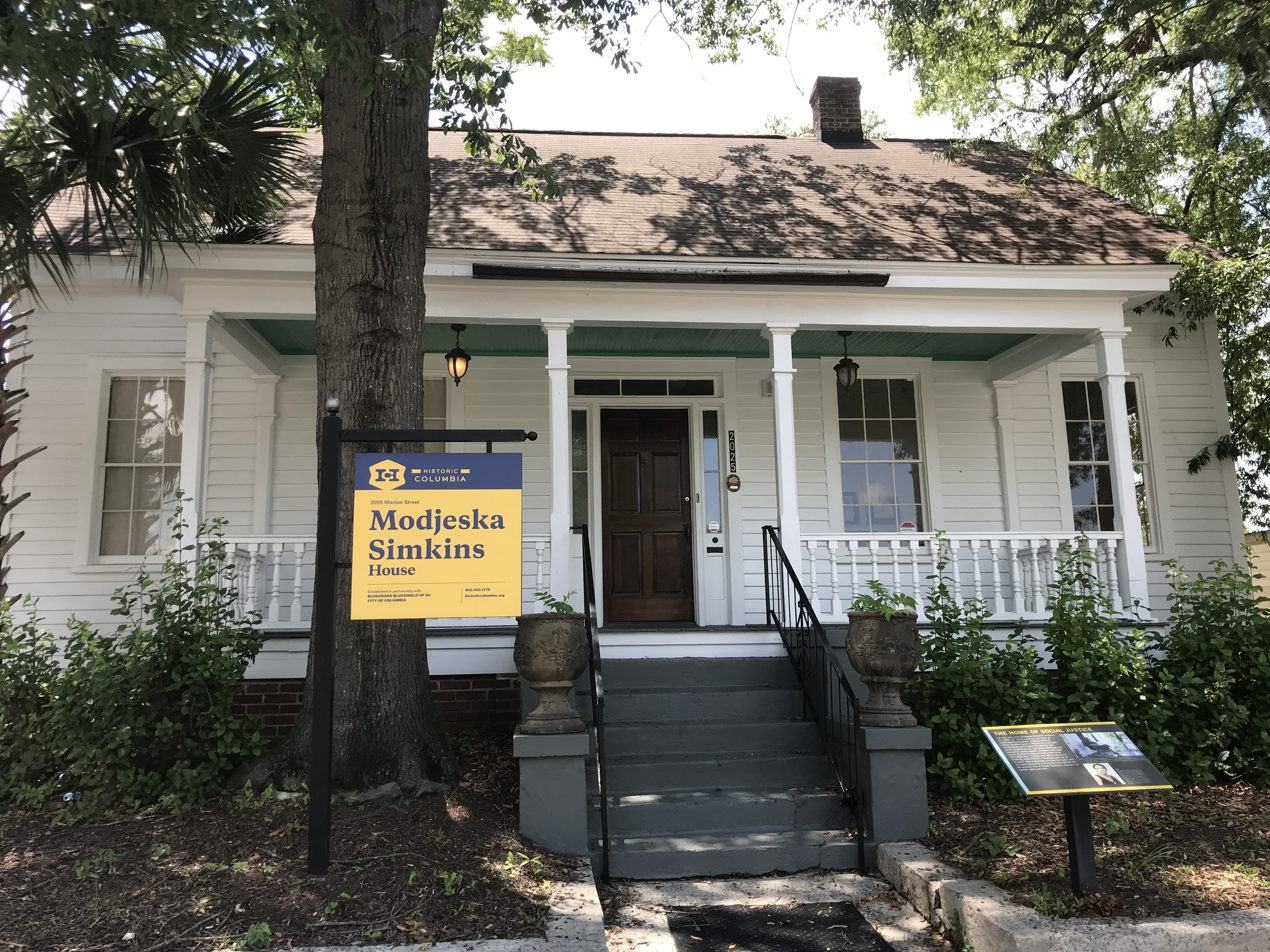
- Modjeska Simkins House, c. 2020

- Location within South Carolina Location within the United States
- Location: 2025 Marion St., Columbia, South Carolina
- Coordinates: 34°0′50″N 81°2′9″W
- Built: c. 1890–1900
- Architectural style: Late 19th And 20th Century Revivals
- NRHP reference No.: 94000263
- Added to NRHP: March 25, 1994

The Modjeska Monteith Simkins House is a historic place of the civil rights movement. The house, which was owned by Modjeska Monteith Simkins, is located at 2025 Marion Street in Columbia, South Carolina. On March 25, 1994, it was named to the National Register of Historic Places.

== Architecture ==
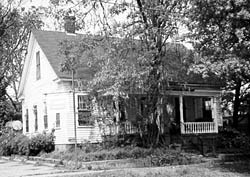

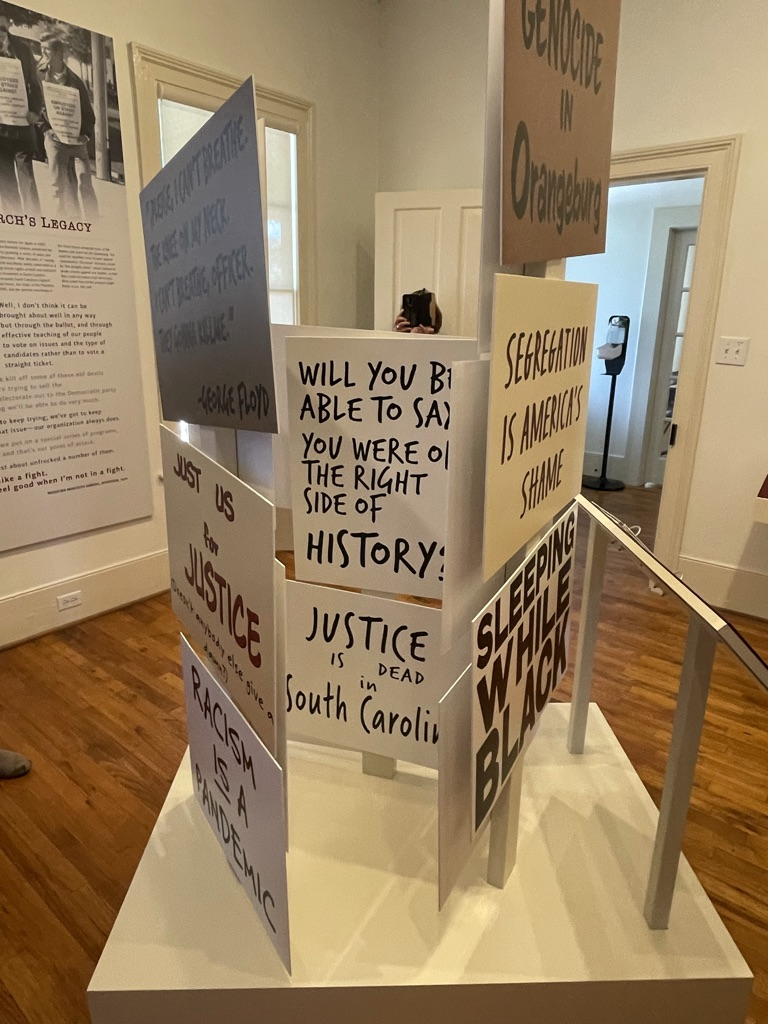
Display inside the Modjeska Simkins House

The house is on a 50 ft (15 m) by 172 ft (52 m) lot on the west side of Marion Street between Elmwood Avenue and Calhoun Street. It is located nearly one block north of the Columbia Historic District II.

The house is a modest, 1 1/2-story, wooden frame house with an L-shaped plan, side-gabled roof, and shed-roof front porch. The house has its original wooden weatherboard siding. The house was originally built on clay brick piers, but the open spaces were later filled with clay brick. The roof is covered with asphalt composition shingles. There are three interior brick chimneys with corbelling. The upper half-story is for storage.

The windows appear to be original. The front of the house has two double-hung, six-over-six, windows on each side of the door. The front wood-paneled door has a transom and sidelights. The porch extends over the door and two windows. The porch has chamfered posts and turned baluster railings. The steps have cast iron railings that have replaced the original wooden railing.

The interior has a center hall plan with a rear extension kitchen. The front of the house has a living room and a bedroom. There are two additional bedrooms at the back. Each of these four rooms has a fireplace. The original floor was replaced with wooden pine floorboards by Andrew Simkins.

Other modifications to the house include a shed-roof bathroom at the rear built in the mid-twentieth century. Iron bars have been placed over the windows in the 1960s.

There is a one-story, three-room building of similar construction at the rear of the property that was probably built around the same time as the main house. This was probably used as a guest house for visiting civil rights workers.

== History ==
Although an oral tradition indicates that the house was built before the Civil War, it is likely constructed c. 1900. The Simkins family moved into the house in 1932.

After Modejska Simkins' death in 1992, the house was vacant for a period. In 1995, the Collaborative for Community Trust, which was a Columbia non-profit organization addressing social change, raised US$60,000 towards purchasing the house. They won a stabilization grant from the South Carolina State Historic Preservation Office. They also received funds from the City of Columbia for the conversion of the house into a museum about Simkins and her work and for a headquarters for their organization. Additional support came from the National Trust for Historic Preservation, the Historic Charleston Foundation, the Historic Columbia Foundation, and the Columbia Housing Authority.

The house is currently managed by the Historic Columbia Foundation. The house is routinely open for tours, and group visits may be arranged.

== Significance ==
The house was the residence, private office of Modjeska Simkins, and guest accommodations for visiting civil rights workers. Her most important contribution was probably her work on Briggs v. Elliott, which became part of the ground-breaking Brown v. Board of Education decision that overturned previous court decisions allowing separate public schools for children of different races. Thurgood Marshall stayed here when the local hotels did not allow African-Americans to register.

A historic marker has been erected at the Modjeska Monteith Simkins House as one of those honoring African American historic sites in Columbia.
