= Santee Cooper Country =

Tourism district in the south central area of South Carolina

Coordinates: 33.561°N 80.481°W

Santee Cooper Country is a tourism district in the south central area of the U.S. state of South Carolina. It surrounds the Santee Cooper Lakes, Lake Moultrie and Lake Marion, which were formed from damming the Santee River and the Cooper River.

This tourism district was created by the state legislature in 1962. It was formed to help create and expand tourism, recreation and development in the five-county region of Berkeley, Calhoun, Clarendon, Orangeburg and Sumter.

The area is the home of the Santee National Wildlife Refuge and several state parks, and offers many outdoor recreation activities such as hiking, boating, fishing, birding, hunting, and golfing.

== Cities and towns ==
- Elloree
- Eutawville
- Moncks Corner
- Santee
- Summerton
