= Bertie Bowman =

American congressional staffer (1931–2023)

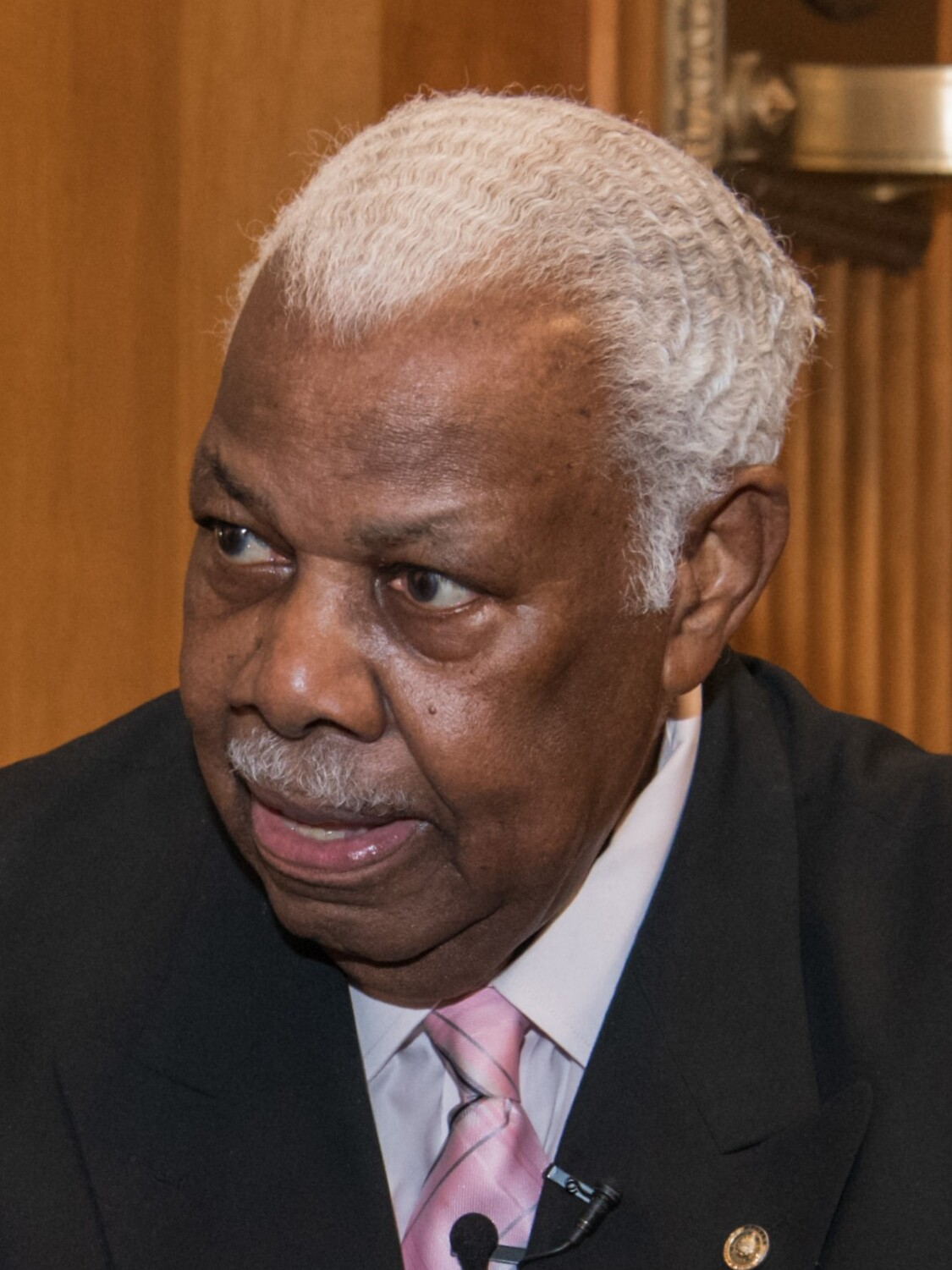
- Bowman in 2019
- Born: Herbert Bowman; April 12, 1931; Summerton, South Carolina, U.S.
- Died: October 25, 2023 (aged 92); North Bethesda, Maryland, U.S.
- Education: Howard University
- Children: 5

Herbert Bowman (April 12, 1931 – October 25, 2023) was an American congressional staffer who served as the hearing coordinator of the U.S. Senate Committee on Foreign Relations from 2000 to 2021. He began working at the U.S. Capitol in 1944 at the age of 13.

== Early life ==
Bowman was born April 12, 1931, in Summerton, South Carolina, to sharecroppers Mary Ragin and Robert Bowman. His mother died and his father soon remarried. Bowman was raised with twelve siblings in a house with no plumbing. After a chance meeting with U.S. senator Burnet R. Maybank who was campaigning for reelection, he moved to Washington, D.C., in 1944 at the age of 13. He graduated from Roosevelt High School.

== Career ==
Maybank hired Bowman to sweep the U.S. Capitol steps. In the late 1940s, Bowman was drafted in the U.S. Army. He later worked in the coffee shop before becoming a janitor, cook, and shoe-shiner for U.S. senators. In the mid-1950s, he worked in the Capitol's barbershop. In 1966, he was hired to clerk on the U.S. Senate Committee on Foreign Relations (FRC). A year later, Bill Clinton worked for Bowman when he was a messenger for the FRC. U.S. senator Strom Thurmond assisted Bowman in enrolling at Howard University, where he studied business for two years. At the time of his retirement in 1990, he was the assistant hearing coordinator of the FRC.

After his retirement, Bowman continued working as a consultant for the FRC. He also took over his father-in-law's limousine business. In 2000, U.S. senator Jesse Helms recruited him to return to the FRC as the hearing coordinator. He served in this position until he was 90 and continued working as a staffer until his death. Bowman served as a U.S. Senate Federal Credit Union board member for 46 years, including two terms as chairman. In May 2019, the credit union named its headquarters after Bowman. In 2020, he was inducted into the African American Credit Union Hall of Fame.

== Personal life and death ==
Bowman was married and later divorced. His second wife, Elaine King, died in 2009. He had a stepdaughter and four children. Bowman died from complications of heart surgery at a rehabilitation facility in North Bethesda, Maryland, on October 25, 2023, at the age of 92.

== Selected works ==
- Bowman, Bertie (2008). Step by Step: A Memoir of Hope, Friendship, Perseverance, and Living the American Dream. New York: One World Ballantine Books. ISBN 978-0-345-50411-1. OCLC 191023953. At the Internet Archive.
