= Summerton High School =

Historic school building in South Carolina, United States

- U.S. National Register of Historic Places
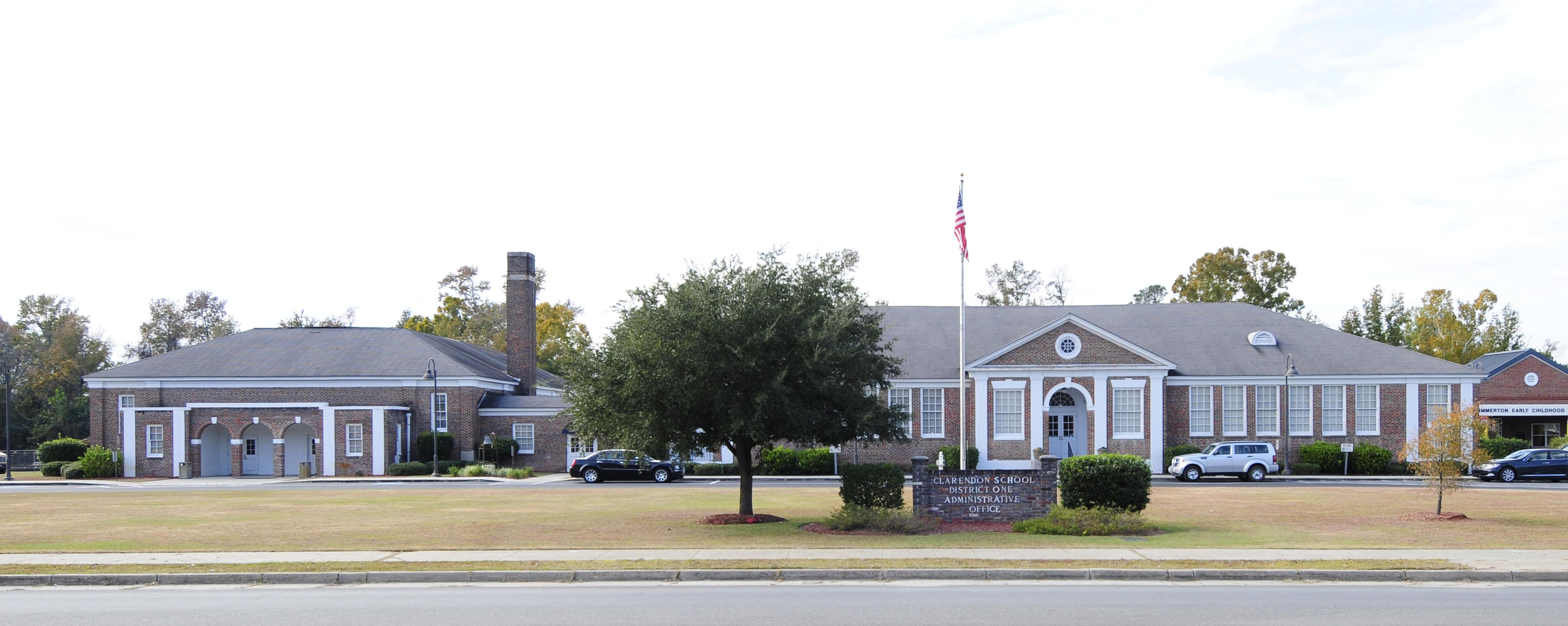
- Summerton High School, November 2012

- Location within South Carolina Location within the United States
- Location: S. Church St., Summerton, South Carolina
- Coordinates: 33°36′24″N 80°20′35″W
- Area: 1.8 acres (0.73 ha)
- Built: 1936
- Architect: Wessigner, Jesse Walter; Stork, Robert Caughman
- Architectural style: Late 19th And 20th Century Revivals
- NRHP reference No.: 94001048
- Added to NRHP: August 26, 1994

Summerton High School, also known as Summerton Middle School, is a historic school building located at Summerton, Clarendon County, South Carolina. It was built in 1936, and is a one-story hip roofed, rectangular brick building. It has a central pavilion featuring a pedimented gable, supported by four cast stone plasters. Summerton High School is the only school still standing of the five schools in Clarendon County School District #22 that were associated with Briggs v. Elliott, the South Carolina case which was one of the cases consolidated with Brown v. Board of Education. As of 2022 the building is used as administrative offices for Clarendon County School District #1.

It was listed in the National Register of Historic Places in 1994. In 2022 it and the former Scott’s Branch High School were designated part of Brown v. Board of Education National Historical Park.
