= U.S. Senate Federal Credit Union =

Credit union in the United States

United States Senate Federal Credit Union
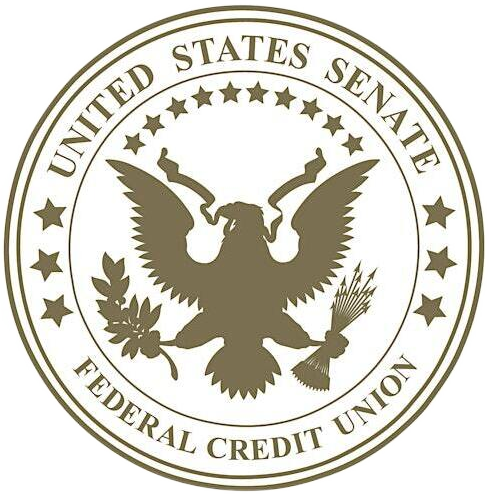
- Company type: Credit union
- Industry: Financial services
- Founded: October 8, 1935; 90 years ago
- Founder: Charles E. Alden; Mack D. Chestnutt; Blaine S. Hollimon Jr.; William E. Howard; Harry E. Cain; Edwin L. Swope; J. M. Henderson; D. Roland Potter; Morris Sheppard
- Headquarters: Alexandria, Virginia, United States
- Key people: Timothy L. Anderson (President and CEO)
- Products: Savings, checking accounts, consumer loans, mortgage loans, credit cards
- Total assets: ▲US$1.6 billion (2024)
- Members: 52,488 (June 2025)
- Number of employees: 156 (June 2025)
- Website: ussfcu.org

The United States Senate Federal Credit Union (USSFCU) is an American credit union headquartered in Alexandria, Virginia. Founded in 1935 during the Great Depression, USSFCU originally served United States Senate employees and has since expanded to serve over 140 select employee groups throughout the Washington metropolitan area.

== History ==
=== Founding (1935) ===
On October 8, 1935, at the height of the Great Depression, nine United States Senate employees pooled their resources and chartered the United States Senate Employees Federal Credit Union with just $45.00. Their goal was to provide quality financial services to workers throughout the Senate. The nine founding members were Charles E. Alden, Mack D. Chestnutt, Blaine S. Hollimon Jr., William E. Howard, Harry E. Cain, Edwin L. Swope, J. M. Henderson, D. Roland Potter, and Morris Sheppard. Each organizer received one share for their $5 deposit, which remains the minimum deposit amount to open an account with the credit union.

=== Early growth ===
Initially operating out of an office in the Russell Senate Office Building, United States Senate Employees Federal Credit Union enjoyed decades of continuous membership and revenue growth. During this time, the credit union opened its membership to include employees from the Architect of the Capitol and the U.S. Supreme Court.

In October 1983, the credit union branch and operations expanded, moving into the newly constructed Hart Senate Office Building. By the time of its 50th anniversary in 1985, the institution served over 15,000 members.

=== Name change and mergers ===
In 1990, the United States Senate Employees Federal Credit Union Board formally approved a name change to the United States Senate Federal Credit Union (USSFCU).

Mergers with three other federal credit unions helped USSFCU achieve dramatic growth into the new century:

- In 1992, the USSFCU Board approved a merger with the Government Accountability Office (GAO) Federal Credit Union, adding 2,700 new members and enabling the opening of a second full-service branch in the GAO Building at 441 G Street NW.
- District of Columbia Unemployment Federal Credit Union (DCUFCU)
- American Trucking Association Federal Credit Union (ATAFCU)

=== Recent milestones ===
By the time of its 65th anniversary in 2000, USSFCU assets had reached $204 million and its membership stood at over 28,000.

As USSFCU celebrated its 80th anniversary in 2015, the credit union had grown to serve more than 32,000 members and manage over $550 million in assets. In 2020, USSFCU crossed the $1 billion mark in total assets.

Under the leadership of President and CEO Timothy L. Anderson, who assumed the role in 2019, USSFCU has surpassed $1.5 billion in assets. As of 2024, USSFCU has $1.6 billion in assets. As of June 2025, the credit union had grown to 156 employees and 52,488 members at 4 locations.

=== Headquarters ===
In September 2021, USSFCU officially opened its new headquarters and flagship branch in the Braddock Station neighborhood of Alexandria, Virginia. The building was named the Bertie H. Bowman Building in honor of Bertie Bowman, the longest-serving staffer in U.S. Senate history with over 65 years of service on Capitol Hill and USSFCU's longest-serving board member, who served 46 years including two terms as chairman.

== Services and membership ==
USSFCU operates as a member-owned, not-for-profit financial cooperative. The credit union offers a full range of financial services including savings accounts, money market accounts, certificates of deposit, IRAs, consumer loans, auto loans, mortgages, home equity loans, and student loans.

=== Membership eligibility ===
With over 140 paths to membership, USSFCU serves the Senate and Capitol Hill communities as well as numerous select employee groups throughout the Washington, D.C. metropolitan area. Membership eligibility extends to employees of various government agencies, associations, and organizations that have established relationships with the credit union.

== Awards and recognition ==
- 2024 and 2025 USA Today Top Workplace
- 2024 Culture Excellence Award for Inclusion and Belonging (USA Today)
- 2024 Credit Union Mortgage Association (CUMA) Titanium Award
- 2021 VMware ACE Award for business innovation through technology
- 5-Star Rating from Bankrate.com
- Ranked #79 in Top 200 Healthiest Credit Unions by DepositAccounts.com

== Community involvement ==
USSFCU is actively involved in community service and philanthropy. The credit union has been a long-time sponsor of the Credit Union Cherry Blossom 10-Mile Race, which raises funds for Children's Miracle Network Hospitals. Since 2002, the credit union has helped raise over $11 million for the organization.

In 2025, USSFCU launched the USSFCU Foundation, a nonprofit 501(c)(3) organization dedicated to advancing financial literacy, wellness, and inclusion throughout the D.C. metro area.
