= Modjeska Monteith Simkins =

African-American activist (1899–1992)

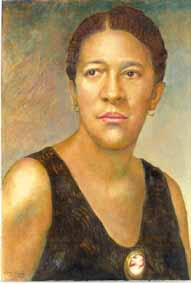
- Born: December 5, 1899; Columbia, South Carolina, U.S.
- Died: April 5, 1992 (aged 92); Columbia, South Carolina, U.S.
- Resting place: Palmetto Cemetery; Columbia, South Carolina
- Education: Benedict College
- Occupation: Public health
- Known for: Civil rights
- Political party: Republican (before 1952); Democratic (1952–1992)
- Spouse: Andrew Whitfield Simkins
- Parent(s): Henry Clarence Montieth; Rachel Evelyn Hull

Modjeska Monteith Simkins (December 5, 1899 – April 5, 1992) was an important leader of African-American public health reform, social reform and the Civil Rights Movement in South Carolina.

== Early life ==
Modjeska Monteith was born on December 5, 1899, in Columbia, South Carolina. Her father, Henry Clarence Montieth, worked as a brick mason, and her mother was Rachel Evelyn Hall. Modjeska lived on a farm near Columbia and attended elementary school, high school and Benedict College, receiving a Bachelor of Arts degree in 1921. The same year, she began teaching at Booker T. Washington High School. Because public schools in Columbia did not allow married women to teach, she was asked to resign when she married Andrew Whitfield Simkins in December 1929.

In 1931, Simkins entered the field of public health as the Director of Negro Work for the South Carolina Tuberculosis Association, and became the state's only full-time, statewide African-American public health worker. For decades prior to the 1930s, southern racism and poverty had created an alarming increase in deaths among African Americans due to tuberculosis, pellagra and other illnesses. By creating alliances with influential white and African-American groups and raising funds, Simkins made a substantial impact on the health of African Americans in South Carolina.

== Civil rights advocate ==
In 1942, Simkins lost her position with the Tuberculosis Association, partly due to her increasing involvement with the NAACP (National Association for the Advancement of Colored People). In 1939, when the South Carolina NAACP was formed, Simkins was already a member of the executive board of the local Columbia NAACP branch and the chair of its program committee. Simkins became one of the founders of the state conference, elected to the first executive board, and the first chair of the state programs committee. In 1941, she was elected Secretary of the state conference, the only woman to serve as an officer.

During her tenure as Secretary (1941–57), her work helped the state move towards racial equality. From 1943 to 1945, she was instrumental in gaining teacher approval and support for teacher equalization lawsuits in Sumter, South Carolina, and Columbia, South Carolina. Perhaps her most significant work took place in 1950 with the South Carolina federal court case of Briggs v. Elliott.

Simkins was involved in Republican Party politics until 1952, when she switched to the Democratic Party and voted for Adlai Stevenson.

Working with the Reverend Joseph DeLaine, president of the Clarendon County, South Carolina NAACP, she helped write the declaration for the school lawsuit that asked for the equalization of Clarendon County black and white schools. The Clarendon County case was eventually reworked to become one of several individual cases set up to directly challenge the "separate but equal" doctrine in the Supreme Court of the United States case of Brown v. Board of Education in Topeka in 1954.

Because her activism was at times controversial, her life and home became targets of violence. An unknown person shot at her house during the time she was active with the NAACP. In the late 1950s, many began to accuse Simkins of being a communist. Some of her friends were members of the American Communist Party, and she was accused of subversive activities by the Federal Bureau of Investigation and the House Un-American Activities Committee. Furthermore, accusations against civil rights activists for being communists intensified after the Brown decision was passed down.

In 1957, Simkins was not nominated as a candidate for secretary by the Nominations Committee of the South Carolina NAACP. It was the first time in sixteen years that she did not get nominated. Some NAACP officials have suggested that her associations with communists and supposedly subversive groups were the cause of this. She remained active for many years in the Southern Conference Educational Fund (SCEF), a southwide interracial civil rights organization, working with James Dombrowski and Carl and Anne Braden.

Simkins was able to serve in leadership positions that were traditionally unavailable to women in the Civil Rights Movement. In 1981, she was honored by a coalition of civil rights groups, who established an endowment in her name to provide income for activists working for the causes of the underprivileged. Hundreds of people attended a memorial service following her death on April 5, 1992, and Judge Matthew J. Perry stated:

She probably will be remembered as a woman who challenged everyone. She challenged the white political leadership of the state to do what was fair and equitable among all people and she challenged black citizens to stand up and demand their rightful place in the state and the nation.

== Death and legacy ==
Simkins died in Columbia, South Carolina on April 5, 1992, an event recognized by the South Carolina legislature. Simkins was interred at the Palmetto Cemetery in Columbia. Her portrait by Larry Francis Lebby, initiated by legislation sponsored by Representative Alma W. Byrd, hangs in the South Carolina State House. Her residence was restored and placed on the National Register of Historic Places as the Modjeska Monteith Simkins House. The house was noted among the historic sites that made Richland County, South Carolina the municipality with the highest number of preserved sites honoring Black women in the United States.

== Bibliography ==
- Woods, Barbara A. "Modjeska Simkins and the South Carolina Conference of the NAACP, 1939-1957." Women in the Civil Rights Movement: Trailblazers and Torchbearers 1941-1965. Ed. Vicki L. Crawford, Jacqueline Anne Rouse, and Barbara Woods. Bloomington: Indiana University Press, 1993. 85–97.
- Bruce, Catherine Fleming. 'The Sustainers: Being, Building and Doing Good through Activism in the Sacred Spaces of Civil Rights, Human Rights, and Social Movements. Tnovsa LLC, 2016. Second Edition, 2019.
