= Summerton, South Carolina =

- Town
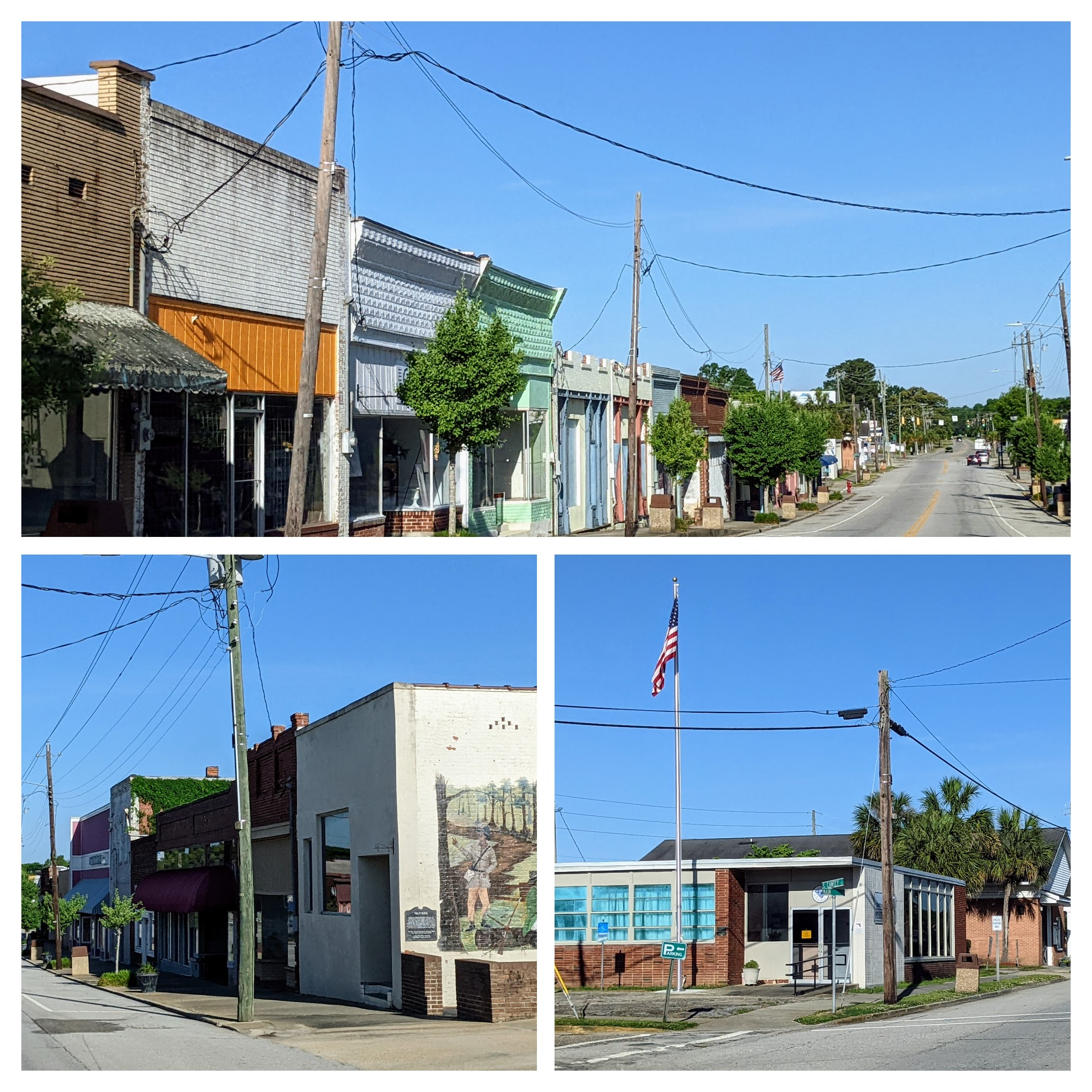
- Views of downtown Summerton

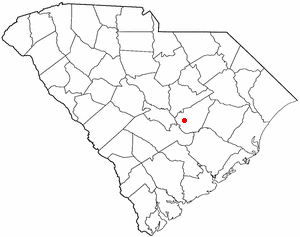
- Location of Summerton, South Carolina
- Coordinates: 33°36′05″N 80°21′10″W
- Country: United States
- State: South Carolina
- County: Clarendon

Government
  - Mayor: Keith Bowman

Area
  - Total: 1.36 sq mi (3.51 km^{2})
  - Land: 1.36 sq mi (3.51 km^{2})
  - Water: 0 sq mi (0.00 km^{2})
- Elevation: 131 ft (40 m)

Population (2020)
  - Total: 814
  - Density: 601.1/sq mi (232.08/km^{2})
- Time zone: UTC-5 (Eastern (EST))
  - Summer (DST): UTC-4 (EDT)
- ZIP code: 29148
- Area codes: 803, 839
- FIPS code: 45-70225
- GNIS feature ID: 2406683

Summerton is a town in Clarendon County, South Carolina, United States. Per the 2020 census, the population was 814.

== Geography ==
Summerton is in southwestern Clarendon County. Interstate 95 passes just south of the town, with access from Exit 108. I-95 leads northeast 57 miles (92 km) to Florence and southwest 120 miles (190 km) to Savannah, Georgia. U.S. Routes 15 and 301 join in the center of Summerton. US 301 leads northeast 10 miles (16 km) to Manning, the Clarendon County seat, and US 15 leads north 23 miles (37 km) to Sumter, while the combined highways lead southwest 11 miles (18 km) to Santee.

Summerton is located in the heart of Santee Cooper Country, 8 miles (13 km) from the shores of Lake Marion.

According to the United States Census Bureau, Summerton has a total area of 1.3 square miles (3.3 km^{2}), all land.

== Demographics ==
Historical population
Census	Pop.	Note	%±
1900	236		—
1910	678		187.3%
1920	957		41.2%
1930	812		−15.2%
1940	958		18.0%
1950	1,419		48.1%
1960	1,504		6.0%
1970	1,305		−13.2%
1980	1,173		−10.1%
1990	975		−16.9%
2000	1,061		8.8%
2010	1,000		−5.7%
2020	814		−18.6%
U.S. Decennial Census; 2010 2020

=== 2020 census ===
Summerton town, South Carolina – Racial and ethnic composition Note: the US Census treats Hispanic/Latino as an ethnic category. This table excludes Latinos from the racial categories and assigns them to a separate category. Hispanics/Latinos may be of any race.
Race / Ethnicity (NH = Non-Hispanic)	Pop 2010	Pop 2020	% 2010	% 2020
White alone (NH)	347	345	34.70%	42.38%
Black or African American alone (NH)	616	430	61.60%	52.83%
Native American or Alaska Native alone (NH)	1	1	0.10%	0.12%
Asian alone (NH)	14	3	1.40%	0.37%
Pacific Islander alone (NH)	1	1	0.10%	0.12%
Other race alone (NH)	0	8	0.00%	0.98%
Mixed race or Multiracial (NH)	5	9	0.50%	1.11%
Hispanic or Latino (any race)	16	17	1.60%	2.09%
Total	1,000	814	100.00%	100.00%

=== 2000 census ===
As of the census of 2000, there were 1,061 people, 452 households, and 285 families residing in the town. The population density was 919.3 inhabitants per square mile (354.9/km^{2}). There were 516 housing units at an average density of 447.1 per square mile (172.6/km^{2}). The racial makeup of the town was 39.77% White, 57.21% African American, 0.19% Native American, 0.75% Asian, 1.41% from other races, and 0.66% from two or more races. Hispanic or Latino of any race were 2.07% of the population.

There were 452 households, out of which 25.7% had children under the age of 18 living with them, 36.5% were married couples living together, 24.1% had a female householder with no husband present, and 36.9% were non-families. 34.1% of all households were made up of individuals, and 14.8% had someone living alone who was 65 years of age or older. The average household size was 2.34 and the average family size was 3.00.

In the town, the population was spread out, with 24.1% under the age of 18, 10.0% from 18 to 24, 22.8% from 25 to 44, 25.5% from 45 to 64, and 17.5% who were 65 years of age or older. The median age was 40 years. For every 100 females, there were 73.6 males. For every 100 females age 18 and over, there were 73.5 males.

The median income for a household in the town was $21,563, and the median income for a family was $34,038. Males had a median income of $34,500 versus $18,906 for females. The per capita income for the town was $13,284. About 18.4% of families and 25.7% of the population were below the poverty line, including 29.0% of those under age 18 and 24.4% of those age 65 or over.

== History ==
Summerton's history began circa 1830 to 1840. Plantation owners made their move inward to Summerton to escape from the mosquitos along the Santee River. It was thought of as a health resort and safe retreat from the "malaria" associated with the swamp. The town was officially chartered by the South Carolina legislative delegation on Christmas Eve, 1889.

Summerton is well known for the court case Briggs v. Elliott (Court citation:347 US 483). Briggs was the first filed of the four court cases combined into Brown v. Board of Education, the famous case in which the U.S. Supreme Court in 1954 officially overturned racial segregation in U.S. public schools. Summerton High School and Scott’s Branch High School were added to Brown v. Board of Education National Historical Park in 2022.

Despite the outcome of Briggs and Brown, as of 2004 Summerton's schools remain effectively segregated, with nearly all white students now attending the private Clarendon Hall, leaving the public schools almost entirely African-American. As of 2004, 95% of public high school students at Scotts Branch High are black, despite 40% white population in the community.

Today, Summerton is still noted for being a summer retreat and vacation spot for visitors interested in nature and outdoor recreation activities, e.g. golf, fishing, hunting, boating, camping.

== Education ==
It is in the Clarendon County School District.

== Notable people ==
- Bertie Bowman (1931-2023), U.S. congressional staffer
