= Bolling v. Sharpe =

- Supreme Court of the United States

Argued December 10–11, 1952 Reargued December 8–9, 1953 Decided May 17, 1954
- Full case name: Spottswood Thomas Bolling, et al., Petitioners, v. C. Melvin Sharpe, President of the District of Columbia Board of Education, et al.
- Citations: 347 U.S. 497 (more) 74 S. Ct. 693; 98 L. Ed. 884; 1954 U.S. LEXIS 2095; 53 Ohio Op. 331

Case history
- Prior: Certiorari to the United States Court of Appeals for the District of Columbia Circuit

Holding
- Racial segregation in the public schools of the District of Columbia is a denial of the due process of law guaranteed by the Fifth Amendment.

Court membership
- Chief Justice Earl Warren Associate Justices Hugo Black · Stanley F. Reed; Felix Frankfurter · William O. Douglas; Robert H. Jackson · Harold H. Burton; Tom C. Clark · Sherman Minton

Case opinion
- Majority: Warren, joined by unanimous

Laws applied
- U.S. Const. amend. V

Bolling v. Sharpe, 347 U.S. 497 (1954), is a landmark United States Supreme Court case in which the Court held that the Constitution prohibits segregated public schools in the District of Columbia. Originally argued on December 10–11, 1952, a year before Brown v. Board of Education, Bolling was reargued on December 8–9, 1953, and was unanimously decided on May 17, 1954, the same day as Brown. The Bolling decision was supplemented in 1955 with the second Brown opinion, which ordered desegregation "with all deliberate speed". In Bolling, the Court did not address school desegregation in the context of the Fourteenth Amendment's Equal Protection Clause, which applies only to the states, but rather held that school segregation was unconstitutional under the Due Process Clause of the Fifth Amendment to the United States Constitution. The Court observed that the Fifth Amendment to the United States Constitution lacked an Equal Protection Clause, as in the Fourteenth Amendment to the United States Constitution. However, the Court held that the concepts of equal protection and due process are not mutually exclusive, establishing the reverse incorporation doctrine.

== Background ==
In Carr v. Corning (1950), the District of Columbia Circuit U.S. Court of Appeals (with Judges Bennett Champ Clark, Henry White Edgerton, and E. Barrett Prettyman presiding) affirmed a ruling of the District of Columbia U.S. District Court that upheld school segregation in the District citing seven laws passed by Congress from 1862 through 1874 that had segregated the District of Columbia Public Schools. Under Article I, Section VIII of the U.S. Constitution, "Congress shall have the power ... [t]o exercise exclusive Legislation in all Cases whatsoever, over such District ... as may, by Cession of particular States... become the Seat of the Government of the United States, and to exercise like Authority over all Places purchased by the Consent of the Legislature of the State in which the Same shall be, for ... needful buildings". On April 16, 1862, President Abraham Lincoln signed into law the District of Columbia Compensated Emancipation Act passed by the 37th United States Congress that ended slavery in the District of Columbia.

On May 20, 1862, Lincoln signed into law the Washington County Public Primary Schools Act which required that a special property tax be levied on all taxable property owned by non-white persons in Washington County "for the purpose of initiating a system of education of colored children in said county". The next day, Lincoln signed the Georgetown and Washington Cities Colored Children Education Act into law that required the municipal governments of Georgetown and Washington City to deposit 10 percent of the property tax revenue collected from non-white property owners into separate funds to be "appropriated for the purpose of initiating a system of primary schools for the education of colored children residing in said cities" under the control of the boards of trustees of the public schools in Georgetown and Washington City, and that the boards of trustees "shall possess all the powers, exercise the same functions, and have the same supervision over the schools provided for in this act as are now exercised by them over the public schools now existing in said cities".

However, on July 11, 1862, Lincoln signed the Georgetown and Washington Cities Colored Children Schools Act into law that created a separate board of trustees for non-white schools in Georgetown and Washington City who would "possess all the powers and perform all the duties conferred upon and required of the trustees of public schools in the said cities". On June 25, 1864, Lincoln signed into law the Washington County Public Schools Act passed by the 38th United States Congress that permitted "any white resident of said county shall be privileged to place his or her child or ward, at any one of the schools provided for the education of white children in said county he or she may think proper to select … and any colored resident shall have the same rights with respect to colored schools", and repealed the special property tax on non-white property owners in Georgetown and Washington City to fund non-white schools and instead required that the municipal governments of Georgetown and Washington City to appropriate from the general funds of their schools districts funding to non-white schools proportionate to the percentage of the enrollment in the districts non-white students constituted.

On July 23, 1866, President Andrew Johnson signed into law the District of Columbia Public Schools Act passed by the 39th United States Congress that provided that the Washington County Public Schools Act be construed to "require the cities of Washington and Georgetown to pay over to the trustees of colored schools" the funding required under Section 18 of the Washington County Public Schools Act. On July 28, 1866, Johnson signed the Washington City Colored Schools Lots Donation Act into law that required the Public Buildings Commissioner to "grant and convey to the trustees of colored schools for the cities of Washington and Georgetown … for the sole use of schools for colored children" specific land lots in Washington City. On June 22, 1874, President Ulysses S. Grant signed into law the Revised Statutes of the United States Act passed by the 43rd United States Congress that provided for the revision and consolidation of all federal statutes related to the District of Columbia, that retained Section 16 of the Washington County Public Schools Act, retained a separate board of trustees for non-white schools in Georgetown and Washington City, and required the appointment of a separate superintendent for non-white schools.

Beginning in late 1941, a group of parents from the Anacostia neighborhood of Washington, D.C., calling themselves the Consolidated Parents Group, petitioned the Board of Education of the District of Columbia to open the nearly-completed John Philip Sousa Junior High as an integrated school. The school board denied the petition and the school opened, admitting only whites. On September 11, 1950, Gardner Bishop, Nicholas Stabile and the Consolidated Parents Group attempted to get eleven African-American students (including the case's plaintiff, Spottswood Bolling) admitted to the school, but were refused entry by the school's principal.

James Nabrit Jr., a professor of law at Howard University School of Law, a historically black university, filed suit in 1951 on behalf of Bolling and the other students in the District Court for the District of Columbia seeking assistance in the students' admission. After the court dismissed the claim, the case was granted a writ of certiorari by the Supreme Court in 1952. Howard law professor George E. C. Hayes worked with Nabrit on the oral argument for the Supreme Court hearing. While Nabrit's argument in Bolling rested on the unconstitutionality of segregation, the much more famous Brown v. Board of Education (decided on the same day) argued that the idea of 'separate but equal' facilities sanctioned by Plessy v. Ferguson, 163 U.S. 537 (1896) was a fallacy as the facilities for black students were woefully inadequate.

== Decision ==
The Court, led by newly confirmed Chief Justice Earl Warren, decided unanimously in favor of the plaintiffs. In his opinion, Justice Warren noted that while the 14th Amendment, whose Equal Protection Clause was cited in Brown in order to declare segregation unconstitutional, does not apply in the District of Columbia, the Fifth Amendment did apply. While the Fifth Amendment lacks an equal protection clause, Warren held that "the concepts of equal protection and due process, both stemming from our American ideal of fairness, are not mutually exclusive." While equal protection is a more explicit safeguard against discrimination, the Court stated that "discrimination may be so unjustifiable as to be violative of due process." Referring to the technicalities raised by the case's location in the District of Columbia, the Court held that, in light of their decision in Brown that segregation in state public schools is prohibited by the Constitution, it would be "unthinkable that the same Constitution would impose a lesser duty on the Federal Government".

The Court concluded: "racial segregation in the public schools of the District of Columbia is a denial of the due process of law guaranteed by the 5th Amendment". The Court restored both Bolling and Brown to the docket until they could reconvene to discuss how to effectively implement the decisions.

== Controversy ==
Some scholars have argued that the Court's decision in Bolling should have been reached on other grounds. For example, Judge Michael W. McConnell of the United States Court of Appeals for the Tenth Circuit wrote that Congress never "required that the schools of the District of Columbia be segregated". According to that rationale, the segregation of schools in Washington D.C. was unauthorized and therefore illegal.

In a debate, law professors Cass Sunstein and Randy Barnett agreed that while the result was desirable, Bolling does not reconcile with the Constitution, with Barnett saying: "You are right to point out that the Supreme Court's decision in Bolling v. Sharpe is very difficult to reconcile with the text of the Constitution. For this reason, you know that among constitutional scholars of all stripes Bolling is one of the most controversial and difficult cases ever decided by the Court." Conversely, University of Michigan Law School professor Richard Primus has argued that the conventional wisdom among constitutional scholars is that Bolling was not wrongly decided or that the reverse incorporation doctrine is illegitimate, and instead both were "justified by the force of sheer normative necessity."

== See also ==
- List of United States Supreme Court cases, volume 347
