= Marie Smith (activist) =

African-American activist

Marie Smith (1898–1991) was an activist in Portland, Oregon. She was one of the founders of the Oregon Association of Colored Women's Clubs, and was the first female president of the Portland Chapter of the National Association for the Advancement of Colored People.

== Biography ==
Smith was born in Paris, Texas, in 1898, and moved to Toppenish, Washington, in 1910 to live with her father. Her grandfathers were both slaves and her father was a railway depot janitor, baggageman, and mailman in Toppenish. She married Elwood Smith on July 5, 1917 in Spokane, Washington, and they moved to Portland a few weeks later. When Marie Smith and her husband moved from their southeast Woodstock home to a white neighborhood in northeast Portland, they faced housing discrimination from their neighbors who signed a petition requesting them to leave.

== Activism ==
Smith and her husband moved to Portland in 1917. Elwood Smith was a Pullman porter, earning $60 a month, which allowed Marie to be politically active. She was a member of the Model Cities Task Force, Urban League of Portland, and Interracial Fellowship, member of the Interracial Relations Committee organized by Portland City Leadership. She was one of the founders of the Oregon Association of Colored Women's Clubs and became the first female president of the Portland Chapter of the National Association for the Advancement of Colored People (serving from 1949–1950).

Smith began work with the YWCA Portland branch soon after arriving in Portland and became the first African American woman to join the Board of Directors. She was also present at the signing of the Oregon Civil Rights Bill in 1953. She was the first woman to receive a Metropolitan Human Relations Commission Russell Peyton Award and was named Portland's First Negro Citizen of the Year in 1950. In 1976, Portland Mayor Neil Goldschmidt named a "Marie Smith Day." She was also president of the Portland Literary Research Club.

Smith died in Portland on June 18, 1991.
