= John Philip Sousa Junior High School =

Historic school building in Washington, D.C., United States

- U.S. National Register of Historic Places
- U.S. National Historic Landmark
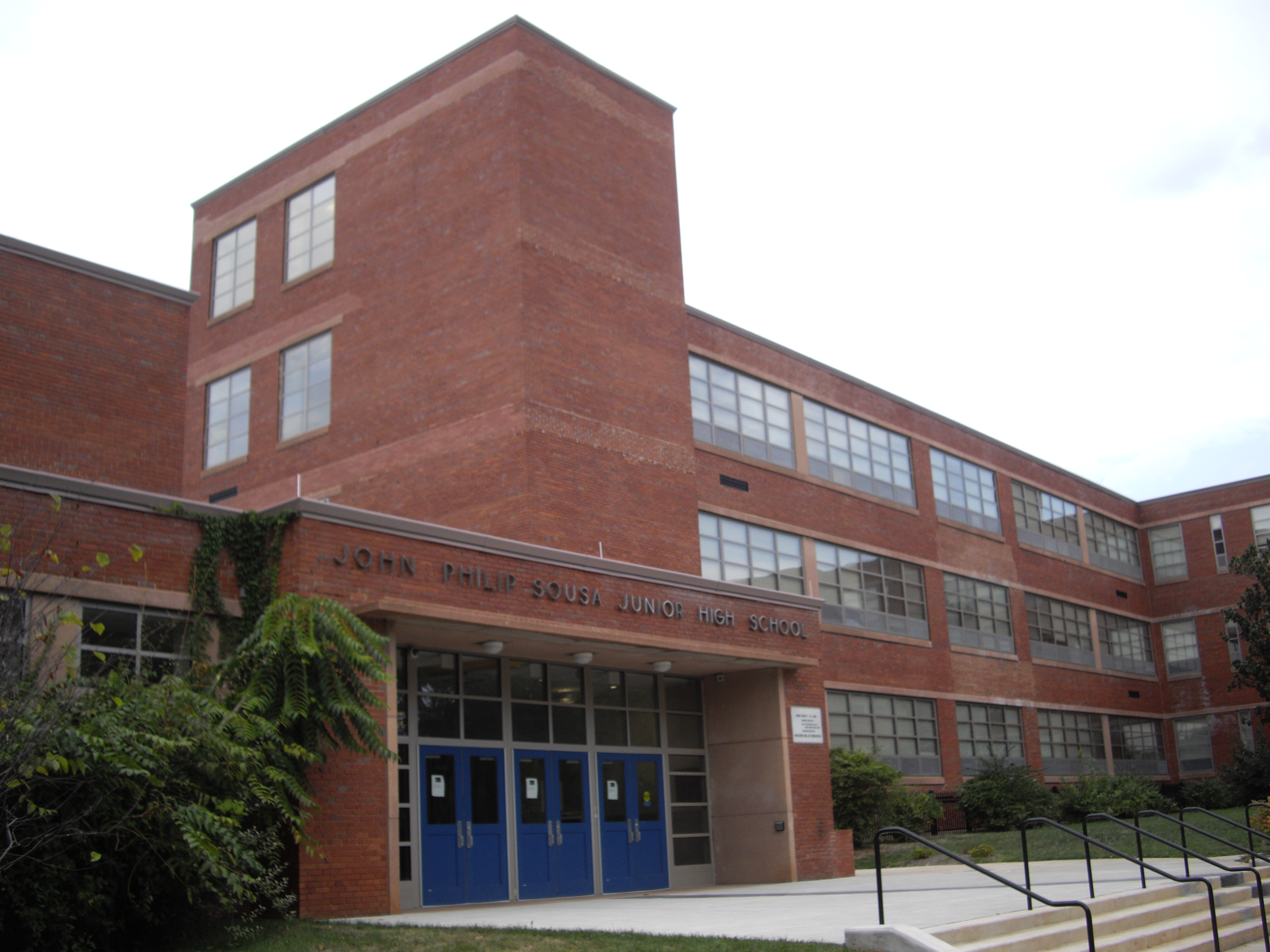

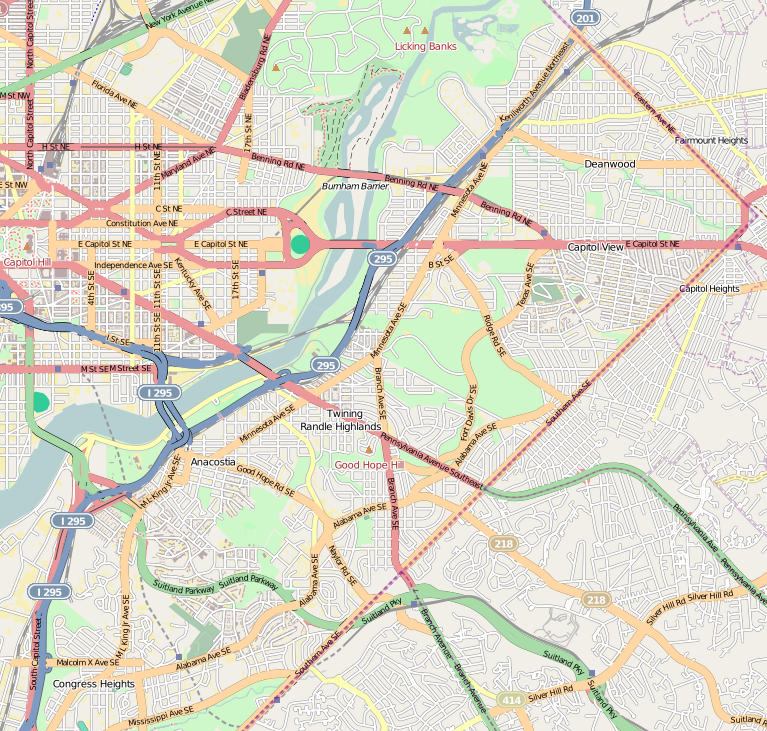
- Location within Washington, D.C.
- Coordinates: 38°53′02″N 76°57′12″W
- Area: 5.78 acres (2.34 ha)
- NRHP reference No.: 01001045

Significant dates
- Added to NRHP: August 7, 2001
- Designated NHL: August 7, 2001

The John Philip Sousa Middle School, formerly the John Philip Sousa Junior High School, is a public school located at 3650 Ely Place in SE area of Washington, D.C. Located in the city's Fort Dupont neighborhood, it serves grades 6–8. Its school building, built in 1950, was the scene of civil rights action not long after its construction. Twelve black students were denied admission to the all-white school. This action was eventually overturned in the landmark 1954 Supreme Court decision in Bolling v. Sharpe, which made segregated public schools illegal in the District of Columbia. The defeat of the legal doctrine "separate but equal" marked an early victory in the modern Civil Rights Movement.

The school was declared a National Historic Landmark in 2001 for its role in this action. In 2022 it was designated an affiliated area of Brown v. Board of Education National Historical Park.

== Description ==
The John Philip Sousa Middle School is located in Southeast Washington, on the north side of Ely Place opposite Fort Dupont Park. It is a roughly L-shaped building with a brick exterior and Moderne styling, ranging in height from one to five stories. Perpendicular to the street is a wing three stories in height, which houses administrative offices and classrooms. The main entrance faces the street at the front of this section, whose street-facing end has a curved half-round elements on the right side. Extending along the road is a wing housing the school's larger spaces, the gymnasium and auditorium.

== History ==
The school was built in 1950, at a time when the district's schools were segregated. Schools serving African-American students were chronically over capacity and poorly funded, while those serving white students were not. African American district residents had been agitating for some time for integration or improved conditions in their schools. A group of parents of Browne Junior High School students organized in 1949 to mount a demonstration and legal challenge to the district's segregation policies. When the new John Philip Sousa Junior High School opened in September 1950, twelve students, accompanied by parents, lawyers, and a police escort, sought to gain entry to the facility, but were denied by the principal. The ensuing legal action resulted in the landmark 1954 decision in Bolling v. Sharpe, where the Supreme Court struck down the district's segregation policy on the grounds that it violated due process (in contrast to the more well-known Brown v. Board of Education, in which state-legislated segregation was struck down on equal protection grounds).
