= Briggs v. Elliott =

- Supreme Court of the United States

Decided January 28, 1952
- Full case name: Harry Briggs Jr. et al. v. R.W. Elliott, chairman, et al.
- Citations: 342 U.S. 350 (more) 72 S. Ct. 327; 96 L. Ed. 2d 392; 1952 U.S. LEXIS 2486

Case history
- Prior: June 23, 1951: Injunction to abolish segregation denied, injunction to equalize educational facilities granted (2–1), 98 F. Supp. 529 (E.D.S.C. 1951)
- Subsequent: March 13, 1952: Judgment reinstated (3–0), 103 F. Supp. 920 (E.D.S.C. 1952); May 17, 1954: Reversed and remanded (9–0), sub. nom., Brown v. Board of Education of Topeka, 347 U.S. 483 (1954).; July 15, 1955: Decree entered, voiding South Carolina school segregation law as unconstitutional, and ordering schools integrated with all deliberate speed consistent with Brown (3-0), 132 F. Supp. 776 (E.D.S.C. 1955)

Holding
- In order that the Supreme Court may have the benefit of the views of the district court upon the additional facts brought out in the appellees report on the implementation of district court's mandate to equalize segregated South Carolina schools, and that the district court may have the opportunity to take whatever action it may deem appropriate in light of that report, the judgment is vacated and the case is remanded for further proceedings.

Court membership
- Chief Justice Fred M. Vinson Associate Justices Hugo Black · Stanley F. Reed; Felix Frankfurter · William O. Douglas; Robert H. Jackson · Harold H. Burton; Tom C. Clark · Sherman Minton

Case opinions
- Per curiam
- Dissent: Black, joined by Douglas

Laws applied
- 28 U.S.C. (Supp. IV) § 1253, S.C. Const., Art. XI, § 7; S.C. Code § 5377 (1942)

Briggs v. Elliott, 342 U.S. 350 (1952), on appeal from the U.S. District Court for the Eastern District of South Carolina, challenged school segregation in Summerton, South Carolina. It was the first of the five cases combined into Brown v. Board of Education (1954), the famous case in which the U.S. Supreme Court declared racial segregation in public schools to be unconstitutional by violating the Fourteenth Amendment's Equal Protection Clause. Following the Brown decision, the district court issued a decree that struck down the school segregation law in South Carolina as unconstitutional and required the state's schools to integrate. Harry and Eliza Briggs, Joseph A. DeLaine, and Levi Pearson were awarded Congressional Gold Medals posthumously in 2003.

== Background ==
Educational segregation in the US prior to Brown

The case began in 1947 when Levi Pearson wrote a letter to the Clarendon County School District requesting that black children be provided with the same bus transportation that white children in the district received:

"A Petition on behalf of my children and all other school children in School District #26, Clarendon County, South Carolina, was mailed to you, since that date I have had no communication from you with regard to this petition nor has any efforts been made to furnish bus transportation to Negroes in this School District. Please advise me if efforts are being made to furnish school bus transportation."

— Levi Pearson, October 1, 1947

In Clarendon County, white children attended schools with a teacher for every grade, class sizes no higher than 30 students, brick schools with heat, indoor toilets, water fountains, modern textbooks, gyms, auditoriums and libraries. However, Black children attended school in abandoned hunting or Masonic lodges and often drafty cabins adjacent to churches. Black children brought coal or wood to burn in oil drums for heat, and purchased textbooks that were discarded from white students. For restrooms, they dug and used privies and toted water from the local wells. One first grade teacher in Summerton handled 67 students; one second grade teacher was recorded as having a class of 79.

Prior to Levi Pearson's letter, the school board reserved all of its 30 buses for white children. Because of this, Pearson's children had a 9-mile journey, one-way, to attend the nearest Black school. The Black children of Clarendon County often had harsh commutes to attend school, including rowing paddle boats to cross bodies of water. In the neighboring Jordan community, some children walked up to 16 miles to and from school each day, and children had to frequently gather wood for heaters within schools. Levi, his brother, Hammett Pearson, and neighbor Joseph Lemon raised $700 to buy the local children a used school bus to use ($8,336 in today dollars), but frequent maintenance led them to ask the local school superintendent, Roderick M. Elliott, for their own bus. Elliott refused, saying that black citizens did not pay enough taxes to warrant a bus and that asking white taxpayers to fund that burden would be unfair.

To advance his efforts for safe transportation for Black children, Pearson retained South Carolina attorney Harold Boulware and rising NAACP star Thurgood Marshall. Marshall argued that, since the local school board already provided bus transportation for white students, the county was in violation of the United States Supreme Court's "separate but equal" decision in the Plessy v. Ferguson case. The case, which was brought against Clarendon County District 26 on behalf of Pearson's son James, met with immediate resistance. As a result of his lawsuit, Pearson v. Clarendon County, Levi Pearson suffered from acts of domestic terror, such as gun shots fired into his home, as well as economic consequences: local banks refused to provide him with credit to purchase farming materials and area farmers refused to lend him equipment.

In 1948, Pearson v. Clarendon County was dismissed on a technicality when the superintendent noted that Pearson's large property covered multiple district lines. When Levi Pearson's brother, Hammett Pearson, learned of the issue, he offered to replace his brother in the lawsuit.

The rejection of Pearson v. Clarendon County caused the NAACP attorneys to pivot and raise their target to complete desegregation. In 1949, the NAACP agreed to provide funding and sponsor a case that would go beyond transportation and ask for equal educational opportunities in Clarendon County. The first step was to craft a local petition for educational equality. This was done by Rev. Joseph Armstrong DeLaine and Modjeska Monteith Simkins, the noted South Carolina civil rights worker. Simkins organized a national charitable effort for the relief of the oppressed African Americans of Clarendon County. Eventually, more than 100 Clarendon residents signed the petition.

=== Additional plaintiffs ===
Others agreed to join the suit of Levi Pearson. Named first in the suit, Harry Briggs, a service station attendant, and Eliza Briggs, a maid, became the main named plaintiffs. Elliott was named the defendant.

When Brown reached the U.S. Supreme Court, South Carolina was one of seventeen states that required school segregation. State law required complete segregation; Article 11, Section 7 of the 1896 Constitution of South Carolina read as follows: "Separate schools shall be provided for children of the white and colored races, and no child of either race shall ever be permitted to attend a school provided for children of the other race." Section 5377 of the Code of Laws of South Carolina of 1942 read: "It shall be unlawful for pupils of one race to attend the schools provided by boards of trustees for persons of another race."

There was little debate about if the Clarendon County schools were unequal. At the beginning of the hearings in U.S. District Court, the defendants shared on the record that "the educational facilities, equipment, curricula and opportunities afforded in School District No. 22 for colored pupils are not substantially equal to those afforded for white pupils."

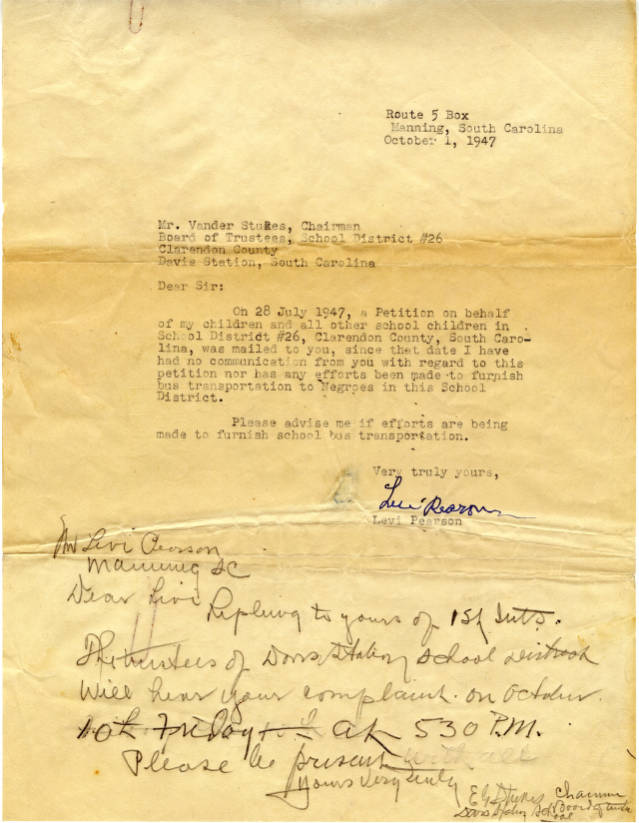
Letter sent by Levi Pearson to the Clarendon County School District, requesting that black children be provided with the same bus transportation that white children in the district received.

== Proceedings ==
The case would ordinarily have come up before Judge Julius Waring of the U.S. District Court for the Eastern District of South Carolina. However, Judge Waring recommended to Thurgood Marshall for the case to be expanded from an equalization case into a desegregation case. Instead of asking for enforcement of the separate but equal doctrine by bringing the African American schools up to equality with the white schools, the plaintiffs asked for school segregation to be declared unconstitutional.

=== Three-judge panel ===
By expanding the case, both Waring and Marshall expected the plaintiffs to lose the case 2–1 and for the case to end up in the U.S. Supreme Court. As predicted, a three-judge panel found segregation lawful by a vote of 2–1, with Judge Waring writing a dissent in which he stated that "segregation is per se inequality." The other two judges were John J. Parker and George Timmerman. The panel also granted an injunction to equalize the uncontested inferiority of the schools used by African American students.

Originally litigated by NAACP lawyer Robert L. Carter, the Briggs case was notable for introducing into evidence the experiments of Kenneth and Mamie Clark, who used dolls to study children's attitudes about race. Under tests performed by Clark, African American students in segregated schools were shown a white doll and an African American doll and asked which one they preferred. When most African American students indicated their preference for the white doll, Clark concluded that segregated schooling decreased African American self-esteem.

== Decision ==
In 1952, the Supreme Court heard the case and returned it to the district court for rehearing after Clarendon County school officials had sent a report on progress in making facilities equal. Between 1951 and 1955, more than 700 "equalization schools" were constructed for Black students across South Carolina, utilizing modern architecture and educational innovations. Even so, the schools were underfunded, teachers were underpaid, and local white-led governments were generally unsupportive of African Americans receiving an equal education.

In March, the district court again heard the case. The Court found that progress had been made towards equality. Thurgood Marshall argued that it may be true, but the real issue was that as long as separation existed, the schools would be unequal. The case was appealed back to the Supreme Court in May. The case was then consolidated with several other school desegregation cases into Brown v. Board of Education.

Briggs was the first of the five Brown cases to be argued before the Supreme Court. Spottswood Robinson and Thurgood Marshall argued the case for the plaintiffs, and former Solicitor General and presidential candidate John W. Davis led the argument for the defense. Following the Brown decision, the lower court complied with the mandate issued by the Supreme Court and declared the South Carolina school segregation law to be unconstitutional.

== Aftermath ==
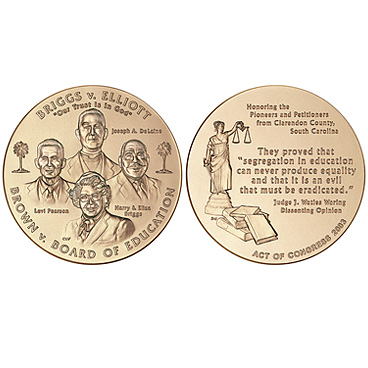
2003 Brown et al. v. the Board of Education of Topeka et al. Congressional Gold Medal

Although Brown resulted in a legal victory against segregation, it was a costly victory for those associated with Briggs. Reverend Joseph DeLaine, the generally acknowledged leader of Summerton's African Americans, was fired from his post at a local school in Silver. His wife, Mattie, was also fired from her position at Scott's Branch, as were all of the other signatories. De Laine's church was burned, and he moved to Buffalo, New York in 1955 after he had survived an attempted drive-by shooting. Both Harry and Eliza Briggs, on behalf of whose children the suit was filed, lost their jobs. Harry spent more than a decade working in Florida to support the family. Eliza eventually joined her children in New York.

Judge Waring had already been shunned by the white community in Charleston and subjected to attacks for previous decisions favorable to equal rights. After his dissent in the three-judge panel, he retired in 1952 and moved to New York.

Eventually, the state of South Carolina awarded Eliza Briggs its highest civilian honor, the Order of the Palmetto. Reverend Joseph A. De Laine, Harry and Eliza Briggs, and Levi Pearson were awarded Congressional Gold Medals posthumously in 2003. The Briggs v. Elliot case is remembered as a pivotal moment in the struggle for racial equality and educational justice. It exposed the systemic inequalities in the American education system and paved the way for desegregation efforts in schools nationwide.

In 2024, the National Park Service announced grants to renovate and restore multiple equalization schools constructed during South Carolina's "separate but equal" efforts in the 1950s. Several such schools have been added to the National Register of Historic Places.

== See also ==
- List of United States Supreme Court cases, volume 342
- Summerton High School
