= 2004 Atlantic hurricane season =

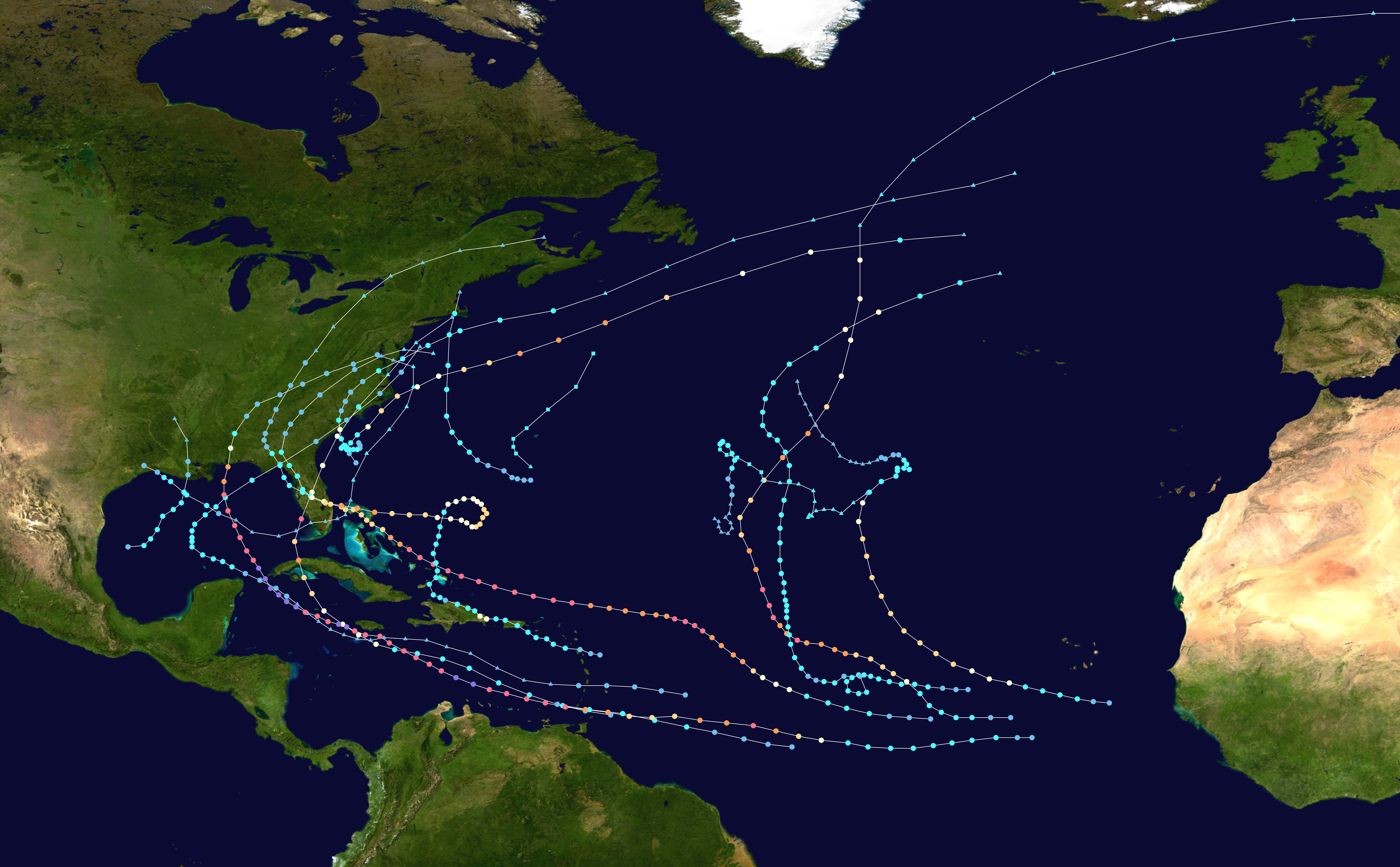
- Season summary map

Seasonal boundaries
- First system formed: July 31, 2004
- Last system dissipated: December 3, 2004

Strongest storm
- Name: Ivan
  - Maximum winds: 165 mph (270 km/h) (1-minute sustained)
  - Lowest pressure: 910 mbar (hPa; 26.87 inHg)

Seasonal statistics
- Total depressions: 16
- Total storms: 15
- Hurricanes: 9
- Major hurricanes (Cat. 3+): 6
- ACE: 226.9 (Sixth highest)
- Total fatalities: 3,261 total
- Total damage: $60.4 billion (2004 USD)

Related articles
- Timeline of the 2004 Atlantic hurricane season; 2004 Pacific hurricane season; 2004 Pacific typhoon season; 2004 North Indian Ocean cyclone season

The 2004 Atlantic hurricane season was a very deadly, destructive, and extremely active Atlantic hurricane season, with over 3,200 deaths and more than $60.4 billion (2004 USD) in damage. (Note: All damage figures are in 2004 USD, unless otherwise noted) More than half of the 16 tropical cyclones brushed or struck the United States. Due to the development of a Modoki El Niño – a rare type of El Niño in which unfavorable conditions are produced over the Eastern Pacific instead of the Atlantic basin due to warmer sea surface temperatures farther west along the equatorial Pacific – activity was above average. The season officially began on June 1 and ended on November 30, though the season's last storm, Otto, dissipated on December 3, extending the season beyond its traditional boundaries. The first storm, Alex, developed offshore of the Southeastern United States on July 31, one of the latest dates on record to see the formation of the first system in an Atlantic hurricane season. It brushed the Carolinas and the Mid-Atlantic, causing one death and $7.5 million (2004 USD) in damage. Several other storms caused only minor impacts, if any. The season was the first to exceed 200 units in accumulated cyclone energy (ACE) since 1995, mostly from Hurricane Ivan, which produced the highest ACE out of any storm this season. Ivan generated the second-highest ACE in the Atlantic, only behind the 1899 San Ciriaco Hurricane.

There are four notable storms: Hurricane Charley, that made landfall in Florida as a Category 4 hurricane on the Saffir–Simpson hurricane wind scale (SSHWS), causing over $17 billion in damage in the United States alone. Later in August, Hurricane Frances struck the Bahamas and Florida, causing at least 49 deaths and $9.67 billion in damage. The costliest and most intense storm was Hurricane Ivan. It was a Category 5 hurricane that devastated multiple countries adjacent to the Caribbean, before entering the Gulf of Mexico and causing catastrophic damage on the Gulf Coast of the United States, especially in the states of Alabama and Florida. Throughout the countries it passed through, Ivan caused 124 fatalities and over $26.1 billion in damage. The deadliest storm was Hurricane Jeanne, which caused torrential rainfall in the mountainous areas of Haiti, resulting in mudslides and severe flooding that caused at least 3,000 fatalities. Jeanne also struck Florida, inflicting extensive destruction. Overall, the storm caused at least $7.63 billion in damage and 3,042 deaths, ranking it as one of the deadliest Atlantic hurricanes in history.

Collectively, the storms of this season caused at least 3,261 deaths and about $60.4 billion in damage, making it the costliest Atlantic hurricane season at the time, until surpassed by the following year. As of 2026, it ranks as the seventh costliest Atlantic hurricane season to date. With six hurricanes reaching at least Category 3 intensity, the most major hurricanes since 1950, and 1996. (Note: A major hurricane is a storm that ranks as Category 3 or higher on the Saffir–Simpson hurricane wind scale.) However, that record would also be surpassed by 2005 and 2020, with seven major hurricanes in those years. In the spring of 2005, four names were retired: Charley, Frances, Ivan, and Jeanne. This tied the then-record most names retired with 1955 and 1995, (Note: and equalled again in 2017) a mark also surpassed in 2005, when five were retired.

== Seasonal forecasts ==
Predictions of tropical activity in the 2004 season
Source	Date	Named storms	Hurricanes	Major hurricanes
CSU	Average (1950–2000)	9.6	5.9	2.3
NOAA	Average	11	6	2
CSU	December 5, 2003	13	7	3
CSU	April 2, 2004	14	8	3
NOAA	May 17, 2004	12–15	6–8	2–4
CSU	May 28, 2004	14	8	3
CSU	August 6, 2004	13	7	3
CSU	September 3, 2004	16	8	5
CSU	October 1, 2004	15	9	6
Actual activity		15	9	6

Since 1984, forecasts of hurricane activity have been issued before each hurricane season by noted hurricane expert Dr. William M. Gray and his associates at Colorado State University (CSU), and separately by forecasters with the U.S. Government's National Oceanic and Atmospheric Administration (NOAA). According to CSU, the average season between 1950 and 2000 had 9.6 tropical storms, 5.9 hurricanes, and 2.3 major hurricanes, which are Category 3 or higher on the Saffir-Simpson hurricane wind scale. A normal season, as defined by NOAA, has 12.1 named storms, of which 6.4 reach hurricane strength and 2.7 become major hurricanes.

CSU released its first prediction on December 5, 2003, which projected an above average season, with 13 named storms, seven hurricanes, and three major hurricanes. This forecast was adjusted upward slightly on April 2. On May 17, prior to the start of the season, NOAA forecasters predicted a 50% probability of activity above the normal range, with twelve to fifteen tropical storms, six to eight of those becoming hurricanes, and two to four those hurricanes reaching major intensity. Dr. Gray released a prediction on May 28 that was similar, with 14 named storms, eight reaching hurricane strength, and three becoming major hurricanes.

After the season began, Dr. Gray announced he had revised his predictions slightly downwards on August 6, citing mild El Niño conditions. His new forecast was thirteen named storms, seven hurricanes, and three reaching major hurricane intensity. On August 10, NOAA released an updated prediction as well, with a 90% probability of above-to-near normal activity, but the same number of storms forecast. CSU issued another forecast on September 3, indicating sixteen tropical storms, eight hurricanes, and five major hurricanes. The season ended up with sixteen tropical depressions, fifteen named storms, nine hurricanes, and six major hurricanes, which matched CSU's final prediction on October 1.

== Seasonal summary ==
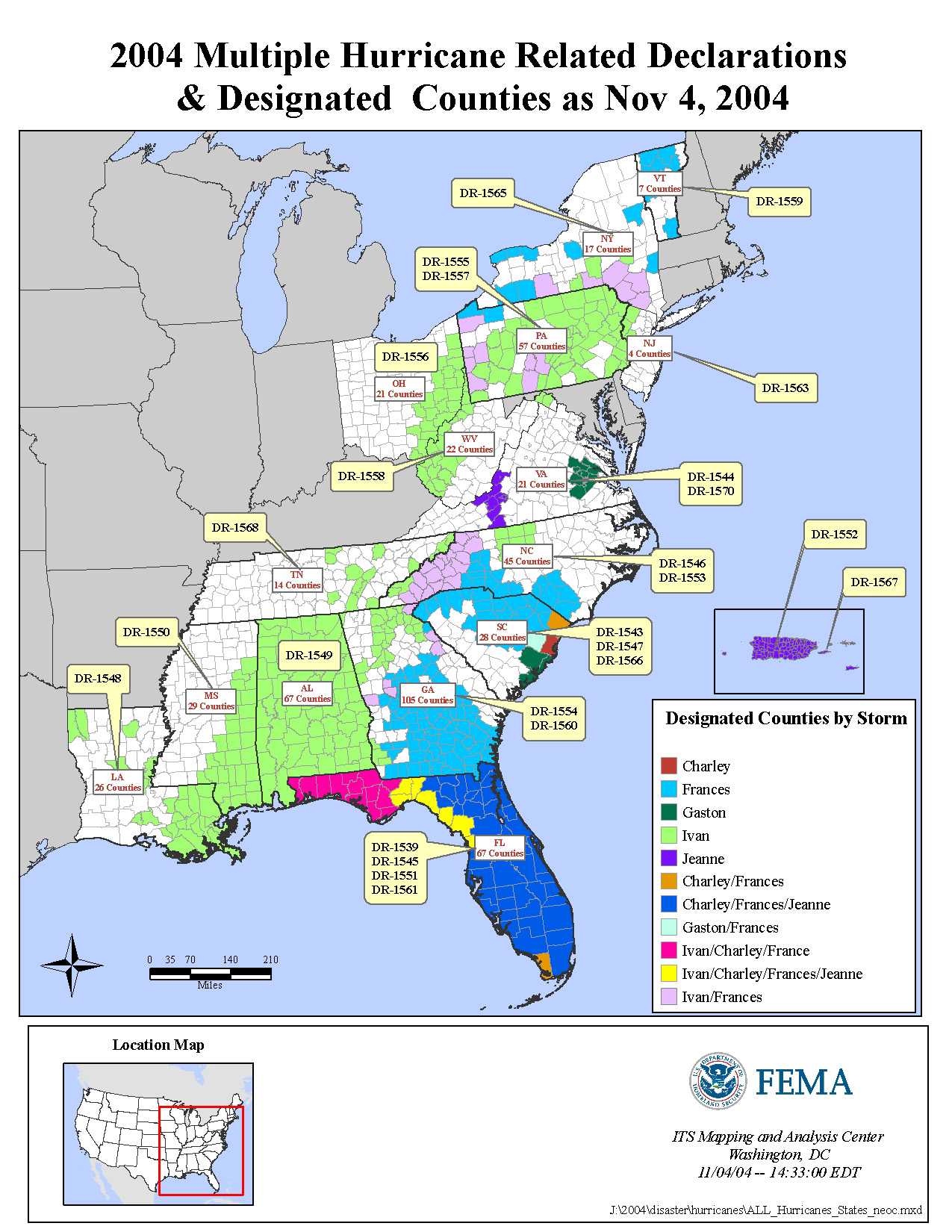
Map of counties in the United States designated as disaster areas in the aftermath of a storm(s)

The Atlantic hurricane season officially began on June 1, 2004. However, the first system, Hurricane Alex, did not develop until July 31. It was an above average season in which 16 tropical cyclones formed. All but one tropical depression attained tropical storm status, and nine of these became hurricanes. Six hurricanes further intensified into major hurricanes. Due to a Modoki El Niño – a rare type of El Niño in which unfavorable conditions are produced over the eastern Pacific instead of the Atlantic basin due to warmer sea surface temperatures farther west along the equatorial Pacific – activity was above average. Five hurricanes and three tropical storms made landfall during the season and caused 3,270 deaths and about $60.4 billion in damage. Additionally, Hurricane Alex caused damage and one fatality, but it did not make landfall. The season officially ended on November 30, 2004.

Tropical cyclogenesis began at the end of July, with the development of Hurricane Alex on July 31. However, it did not become a named storm until the following day, which was the fifth-latest start since the 1952 season. August was an unusually active month, with eight named storms, including Alex, Bonnie, Charley, Danielle, Earl, Frances, Gaston, and Hermine. This broke the record for the most named storms in the month of August set in 1933 and 1995. This new record was tied in 2012. On average, there are only three tropical storms and one to two hurricanes in August. Of the eight systems that month, five became hurricanes and three strengthened further into major hurricanes. A total of five tropical cyclones developed in September, including the most intense system of the season, Hurricane Ivan. Activity decreased further in October, with the formation of only two systems, Tropical Storm Matthew and Subtropical Storm Nicole. The season then went dormant for over a month and a half, until Tropical Storm Otto developed on November 29. Otto was the final tropical cyclone of the season and degenerated into a remnant low pressure on December 3.

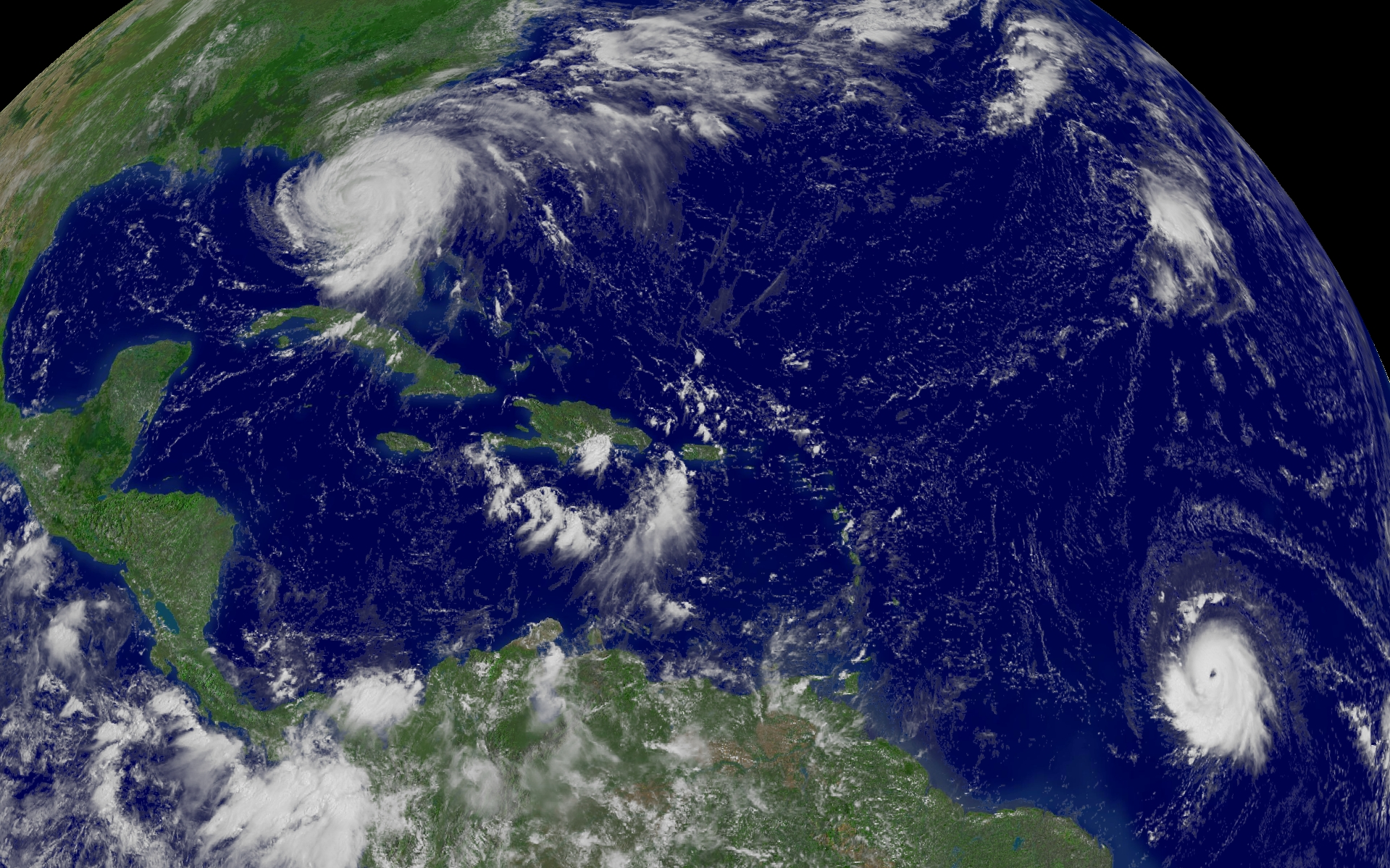
Hurricanes Frances (top left) and Ivan (bottom right) on September 5

Reflecting the season's high activity, the accumulated cyclone energy (ACE) index for the 2004 Atlantic hurricane season was 227 units, (Note: The total represents the sum of the squares of the maximum sustained wind speed (knots) for every (sub)tropical storm's intensity of over 33 knots (38 mph; 61 km/h), divided by 10,000 while they are above that threshold; therefore, tropical depressions are not included.) one of the highest values on record in the basin. ACE is, broadly speaking, a measure of the power of the hurricane multiplied by the length of time it existed, so storms that last a long time, as well as particularly strong hurricanes, have high ACEs. It is only calculated for full advisories on tropical systems at or exceeding 39 mph (63 km/h), which is tropical storm strength.

The 2004 season was very deadly, with about 3,270 fatalities overall. Nearly all of the deaths were reported in Haiti following the floods and mudslides caused by Tropical Storm Jeanne. The other tropical cyclones that caused fatalities include Hurricane Alex, Charley, Frances, Gaston, and Ivan, and Tropical Storms Bonnie and Earl. Because four out of the six major hurricanes made several landfalls, the season was also extremely damaging, with losses estimated at $60.9 billion, over half of which was caused by Hurricanes Charley and Ivan. The collective response to hurricanes Charley, Frances, Ivan, and Jeanne represented the largest operations in the history of both the American Red Cross and the Federal Emergency Management Agency (FEMA). The previous largest FEMA operation was the response to the 1994 Northridge earthquake. A few other tropical cyclones caused light to moderate damage, including Hurricanes Alex and Gaston and Tropical Storms Bonnie and Matthew. In addition to the 16 tropical cyclones of the season, a tropical low in May brought torrential flooding to Haiti and the Dominican Republic, killing 2,000 people and causing extensive damage. Although the system was not officially classified as a tropical storm, it did have a circulation with loosely organized convection, resembling a subtropical cyclone.

List of costliest Atlantic hurricane seasons (as of 2026)
Rank	Cost	Season
1	≥ $294.811 billion	2017
2	$179.253 billion	2005
3	$131 billion	2024
4	$118 billion	2022
5	≥ $80.78 billion	2021
6	$72.34 billion	2012
7	$60.4 billion	2004
8	$54.336 billion	2020
9	≥ $50.526 billion	2018
10	≥ $49.53 billion	2008

=== Records ===
The 2004 season had numerous unusual occurrences and set many records. However, most of them were surpassed by the following year. With six hurricanes reaching at least Category 3 intensity, 2004 also had the most major hurricanes since 1996, a record which would be surpassed in 2005. Florida was directly impacted by four major hurricanes during the season – Hurricane Charley, Frances, Ivan, and Jeanne. This was the first time four tropical cyclones produced hurricane-force winds in one state during a single season since four hurricanes made landfall in Texas in 1886. There were many other hurricanes in the season that were individually unusual. Hurricane Alex was the strongest hurricane on record to intensify north of 38°N latitude. Hurricane Ivan was the most unusual storm of the season. Ivan became the southernmost Category 4 hurricane on record in the Atlantic basin, as well as the first major hurricane in the Atlantic on record to form as low as 10°N latitude. A 91 ft (28 m) wave, possibly the largest ever recorded, was attributed to Ivan; this wave may have been as high as 131 ft (40 m). Additionally, hurricanes Charley and Ivan ranked as the third and second costliest hurricanes in the United States at the time, respectively, behind only Hurricane Andrew. With $60.41 billion in damage, this was the costliest season at the time, until the following year.

== Systems ==
=== Hurricane Alex ===
- Category 3 hurricane (SSHWS)
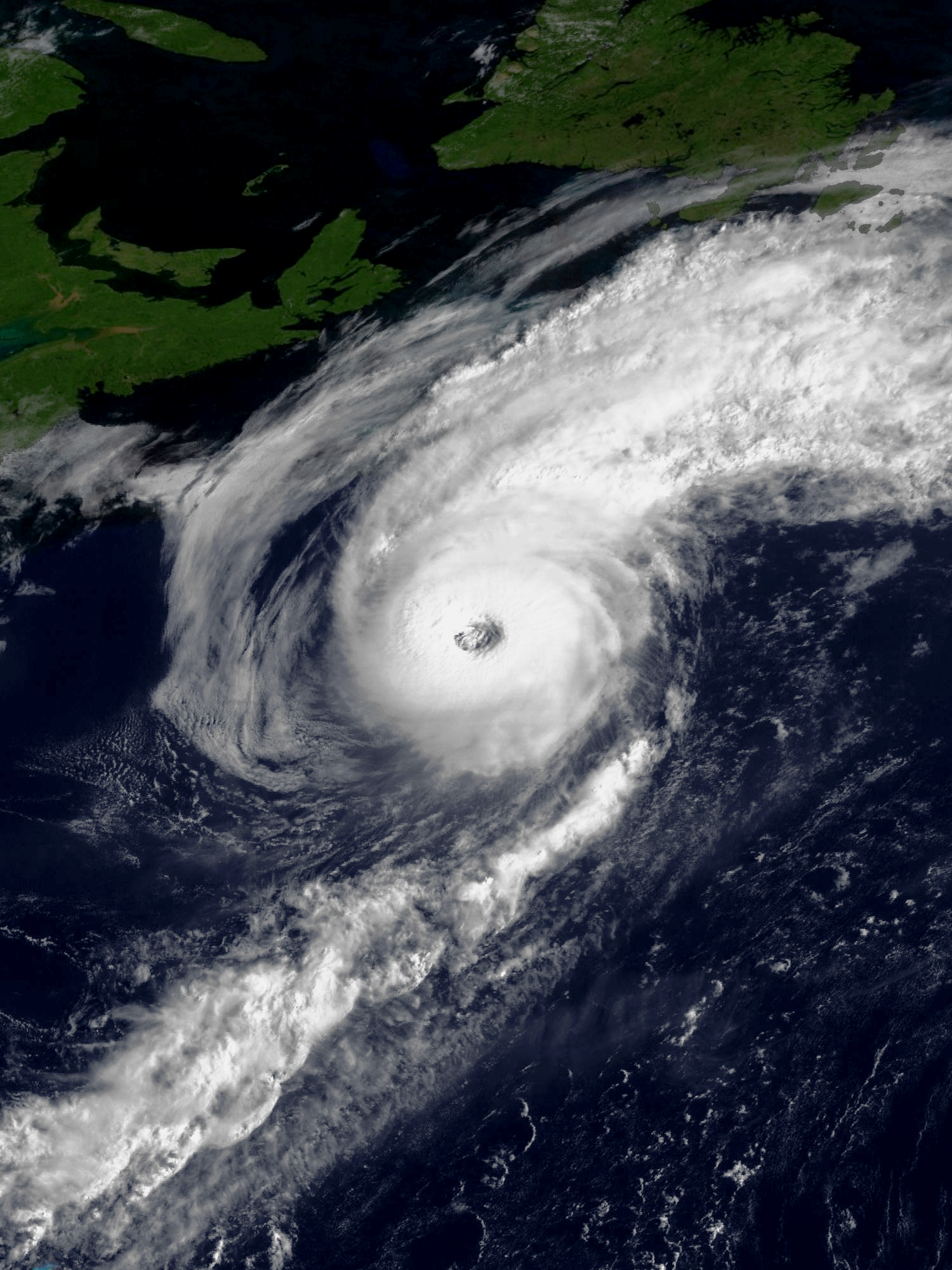
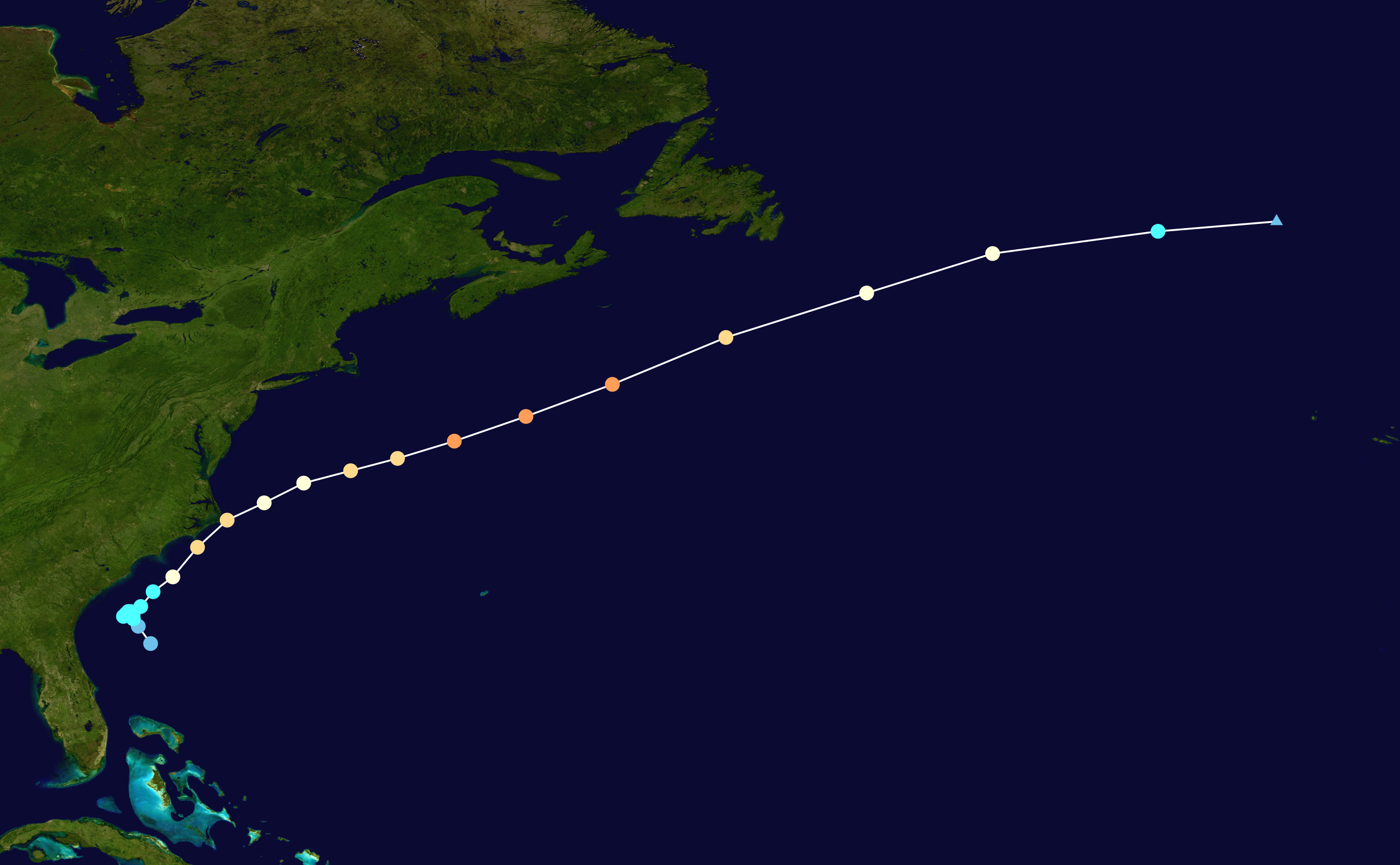
- Duration: July 31 – August 6
- Peak intensity: 120 mph (195 km/h) (1-min); 957 mbar (hPa)

The interaction between a trough and tropical wave resulted in the development of a tropical depression on July 31, while centered about 200 mi (320 km) east of Jacksonville, Florida. After initially being poorly organized, the depression strengthened into Tropical Storm Alex late on August 1. The storm tracked northeastward and became a hurricane on August 3. As Alex moved out to sea, it intensified into a Category 3 hurricane and peaked with winds of 120 mph (190 km/h). Alex reached major hurricane status second farthest north in the Atlantic, after Hurricane Ellen in 1973. Eventually, Alex weakened due to cooler sea surface temperatures. The hurricane fell to tropical storm intensity around 12:00 UTC on August 6. Six hours later, it became extratropical while located about 955 mi (1,537 km) east of Cape Race, Newfoundland, and was soon absorbed by a large extratropical cyclone.

Rough seas and a storm surge up to 6 ft (1.8 m) on the Outer Banks of North Carolina caused minor beach erosion and washed out portions of a highway in Cape Fear. A man drowned near Nags Head due to these conditions. Strong winds also pelted the area, with sustained winds reaching 77 mph (124 km/h) and gusts up to 105 mph (169 km/h) in Hatteras. As a result, 10,000 buildings and houses were left without electricity. The combination of strong winds and the storm surge damaged more than 100 buildings and houses. At Ocracoke, coastal flooding was considered the worst since Hurricane Gloria in 1985. Additionally, rainfall up to 7.55 in (192 mm) on the Outer Banks flooded nearly 500 cars. Damage in North Carolina reached about $7.5 million. In Rehoboth Beach, Delaware, three people were injured by rip currents, while five others were hospitalized in New Jersey.

=== Tropical Storm Bonnie ===
- Tropical storm (SSHWS)
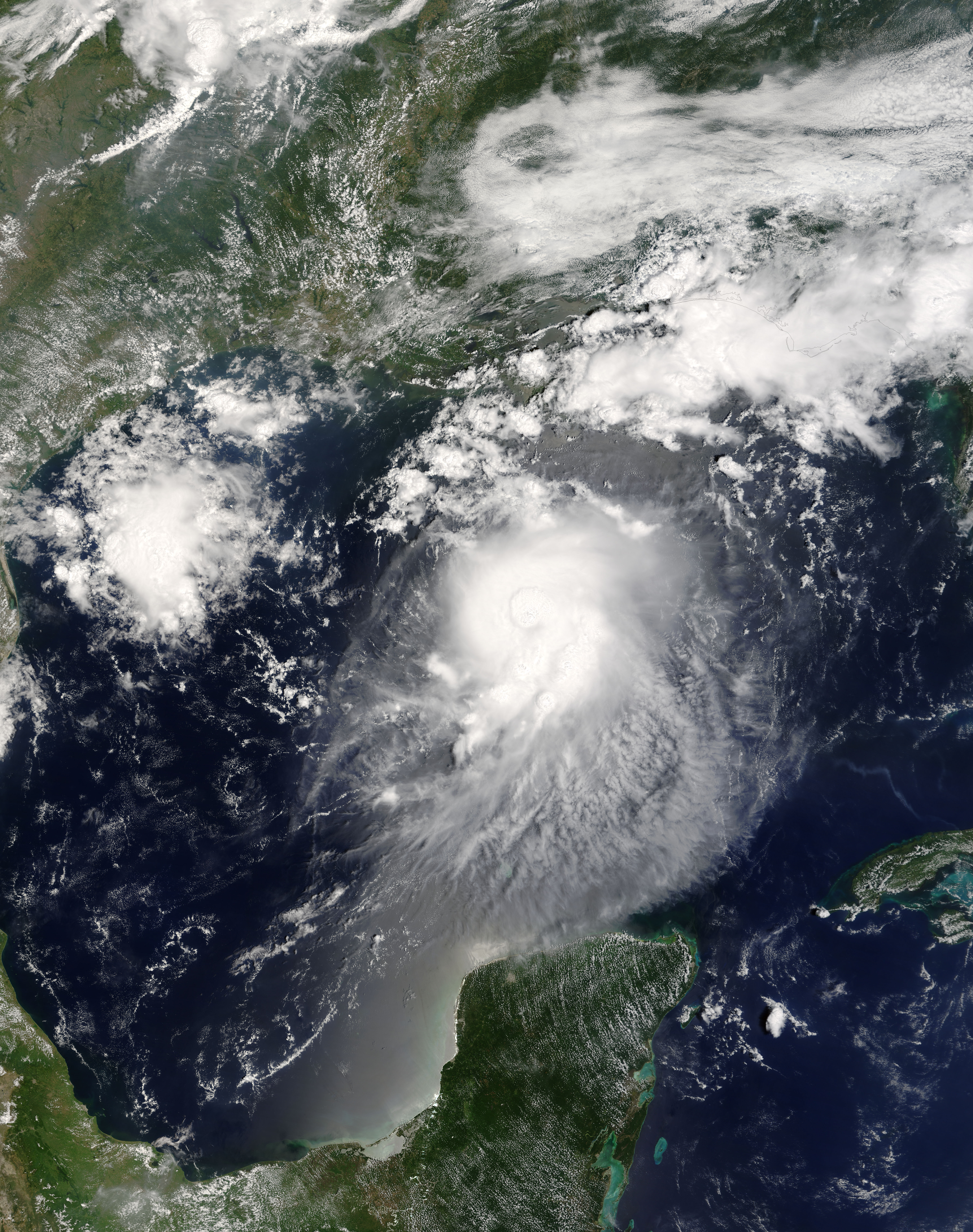
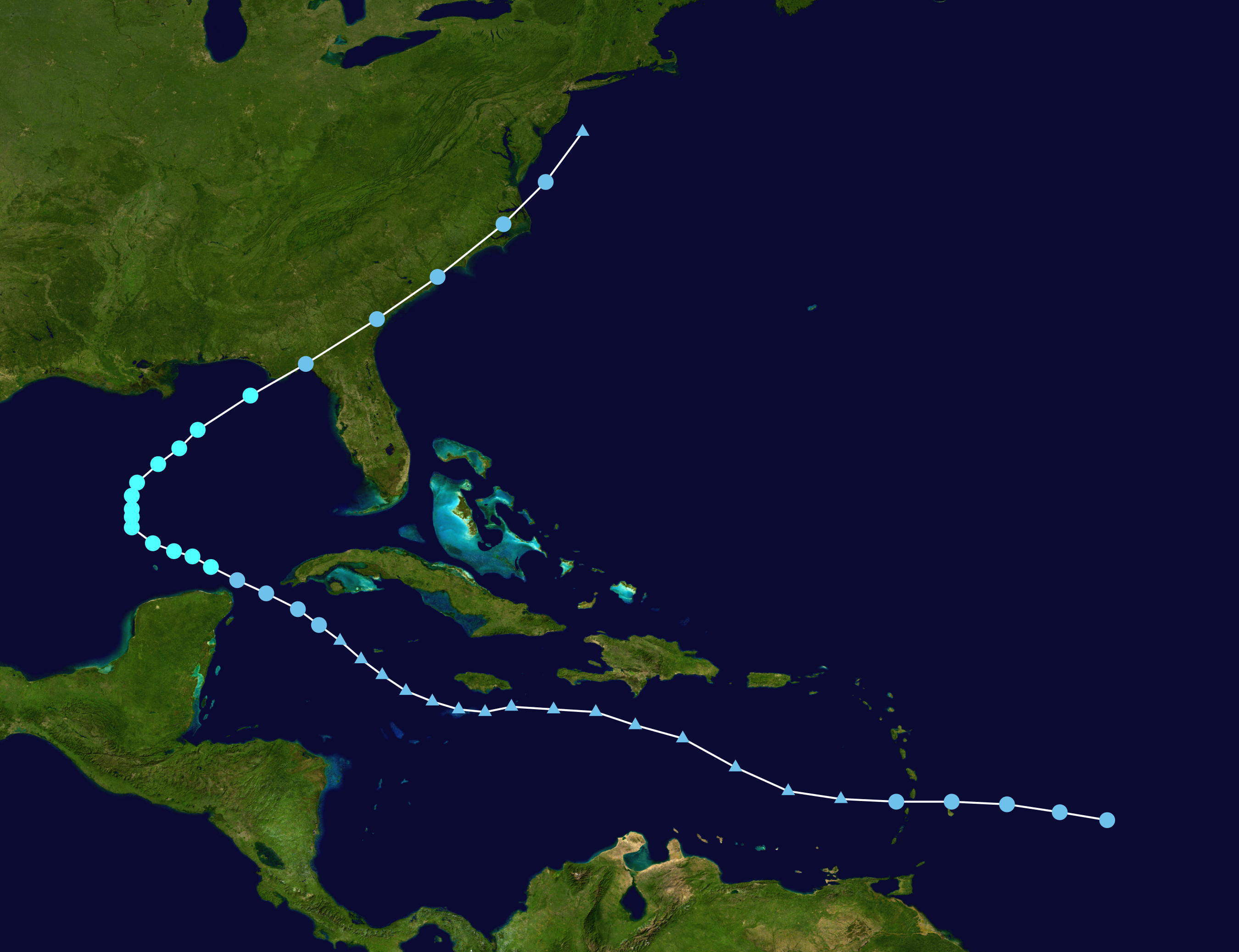
- Duration: August 3 – August 14
- Peak intensity: 65 mph (100 km/h) (1-min); 1001 mbar (hPa)

A tropical wave developed into Tropical Depression Two on August 3, while located about 315 mi (507 km) east of Barbados. The depression crossed the Lesser Antilles on August 4, before degenerating back into a tropical wave. The remnants traversed the Caribbean Sea, and re-developed into Tropical Depression Two on August 8. The depression strengthened further upon reaching the Gulf of Mexico and was upgraded to Tropical Storm Bonnie on August 9. A break in a mid-level ridge re-curved Bonnie northward on August 10 and then northeastward on August 11. Later that day, the storm peaked with winds of 65 mph (105 km/h), before wind shear began weakening it. At 14:00 UTC on August 12, Bonnie made landfall near Apalachicola, Florida with winds of 45 mph (72 km/h). The storm rapidly weakened inland and degenerated as a remnant low offshore of New Jersey on August 14.

In the Lesser Antilles, the storm brought light winds and mostly localized flooding to Saint Vincent and the Grenadines. The regenerated system brought light rainfall to the Yucatán Peninsula. In North Florida, scattered power outages were reported, and rainfall and storm surge flooded roads, especially in Taylor County. A tornado in Jacksonville damaged several businesses and homes. Tornadoes were also reported in The Carolinas, and Virginia, with one in North Carolina destroying 17 homes and impacting 59 others. It also caused three deaths and $1.27 million in damage. In Greenville County, South Carolina, a few roads were washed out, while portions of U.S. Route 501 were inundated with 1 ft (0.30 m) of water. Minor flooding also occurred in Mid-Atlantic and New England. In Atlantic Canada, basement and road flooding was reported, especially in Edmundston, New Brunswick, New Brunswick. Slick roads caused one death in that area.

=== Hurricane Charley ===
- Category 4 hurricane (SSHWS)
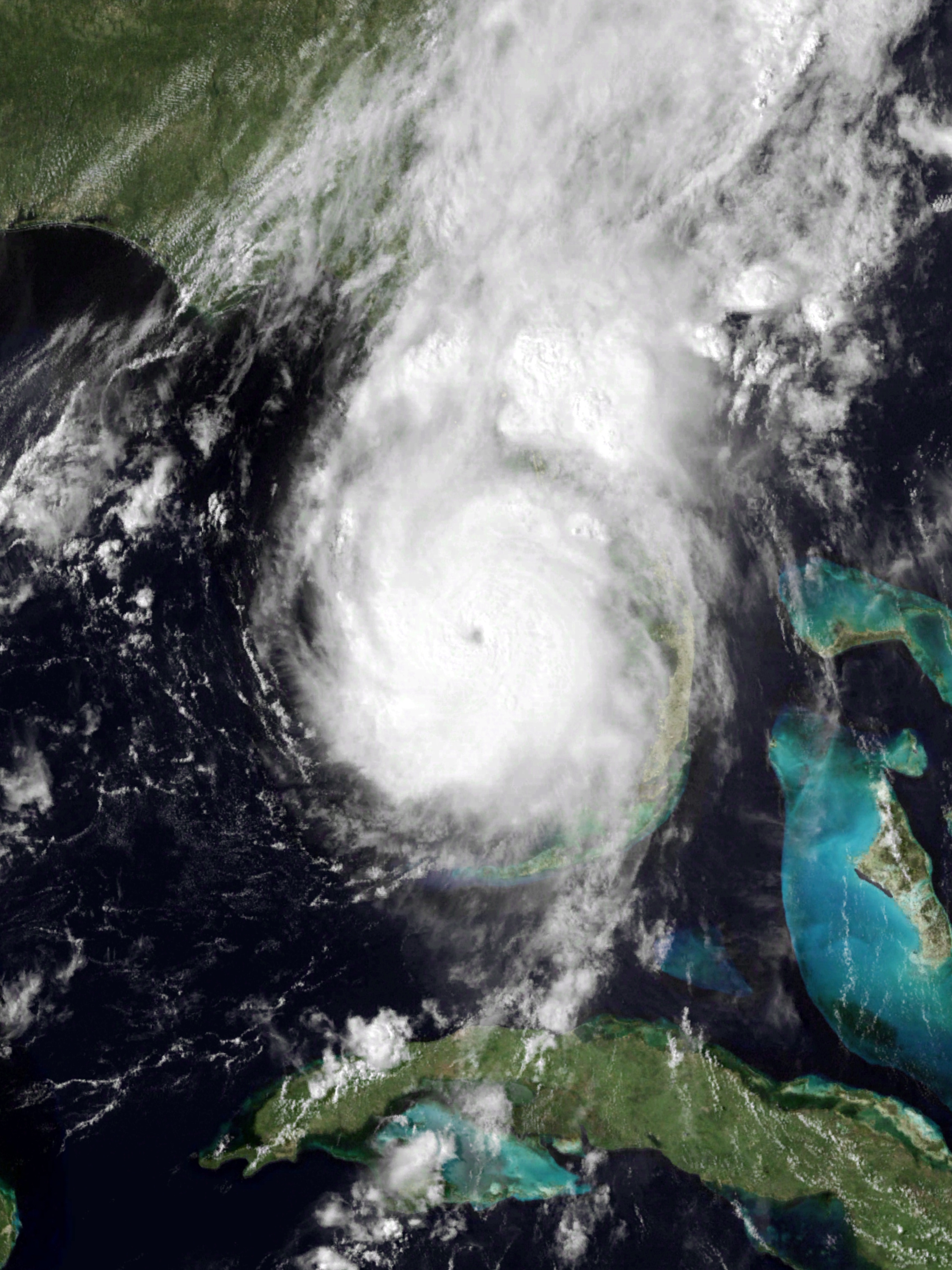
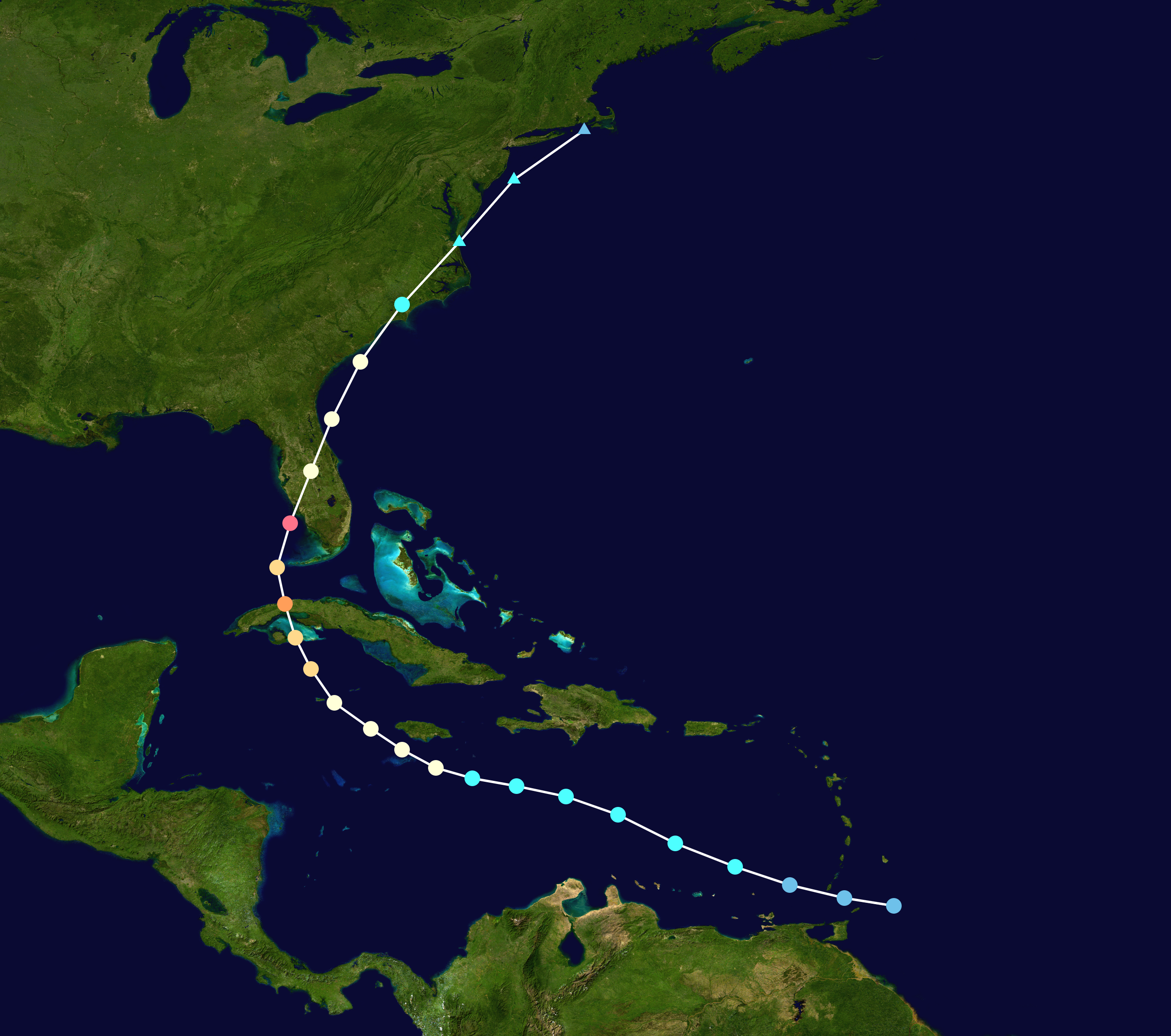
- Duration: August 9 – August 14
- Peak intensity: 150 mph (240 km/h) (1-min); 941 mbar (hPa)

A tropical wave developed into Tropical Depression Three on August 9 to the south-southeast of Barbados. Early on August 10, it was upgraded to Tropical Storm Charley, before reaching hurricane intensity south of Jamaica on August 11. Charley continued to strengthen after curving northwestward and was a 120 mph (190 km/h) Category 3 hurricane when it made landfall near Alquízar, Cuba on August 13. After emerging into the Straits of Florida, Charley weakened to a Category 2 hurricane. However, the storm abruptly strengthened into a Category 4 hurricane later on August 13, with winds peaking at 150 mph (240 km/h). At 19:45 UTC on August 13, Charley made landfall at Cayo Costa, Florida, followed by another landfall in Punta Gorda about an hour later. Charley rapidly weakened over Florida, falling to Category 1 by early on August 14. Later that day, the storm emerged into the Atlantic, before making two more landfalls in Cape Romain and Myrtle Beach, South Carolina as a minimal hurricane. Late on August 14, Charley weakened to a tropical storm over southeastern North Carolina, shortly before becoming extratropical near Virginia Beach, Virginia.

The storm brought rainfall and strong winds to the island of Jamaica. In Westmoreland Parish, flooding inundated several homes and damaged roadways. Winds in the parish caused a large tree to fall on a house, resulting in significant damage to the home. In Kingston, high winds damaged power lines and homes. Widespread power outages occurred due to numerous downed trees and power lines. The storm left $4.1 million in damage and one fatality in Jamaica. Winds up to 118 mph (190 km/h) in Cuba left all of Pinar del Río Province and more than 50% of La Habana Province without electricity for several days. At least 70,290 homes and about 3,000 agricultural buildings were either damaged or destroyed. Nearly 1,500 power lines and 28 wire towers were downed by Charley. Roughly 95% of sugar cane, bean, and banana crops were ruined, and around 57,000 acres (230 km^{2}) of fruit trees were destroyed. There were four deaths and $923 million in damage.

Impact in Florida was extreme: strong winds caused 2 million power outages and destroyed more than 2,439 structures and impacted over 26,749 others. About 95% of the buildings in downtown Arcadia were damaged. Charley caused 24 deaths and 792 injuries. Agricultural losses were heavy, especially to oranges. Damage to agriculture totaled about $2.2 billion. In South Carolina, 2,231 houses were damaged, with 2,317 of those severely damaged and 40 were destroyed. Six hotels suffered roof and outer wall damage. Approximately 141,000 people were left without electricity. Port Charlotte was left without electricity for 13 days. Winds up to 85 mph (137 km/h) in North Carolina downed trees and power lines, and left 65,000 homes without power. Charley destroyed 40 houses and damaged 2,231 other homes in the state. Charley spawned five tornadoes statewide, one of which damaged twenty structures. Throughout the United States, the storm caused $16 billion in damage, with nearly of all of it in Florida. The remnants of Charley produced light rainfall in Nova Scotia and Newfoundland.

=== Hurricane Danielle ===
- Category 2 hurricane (SSHWS)
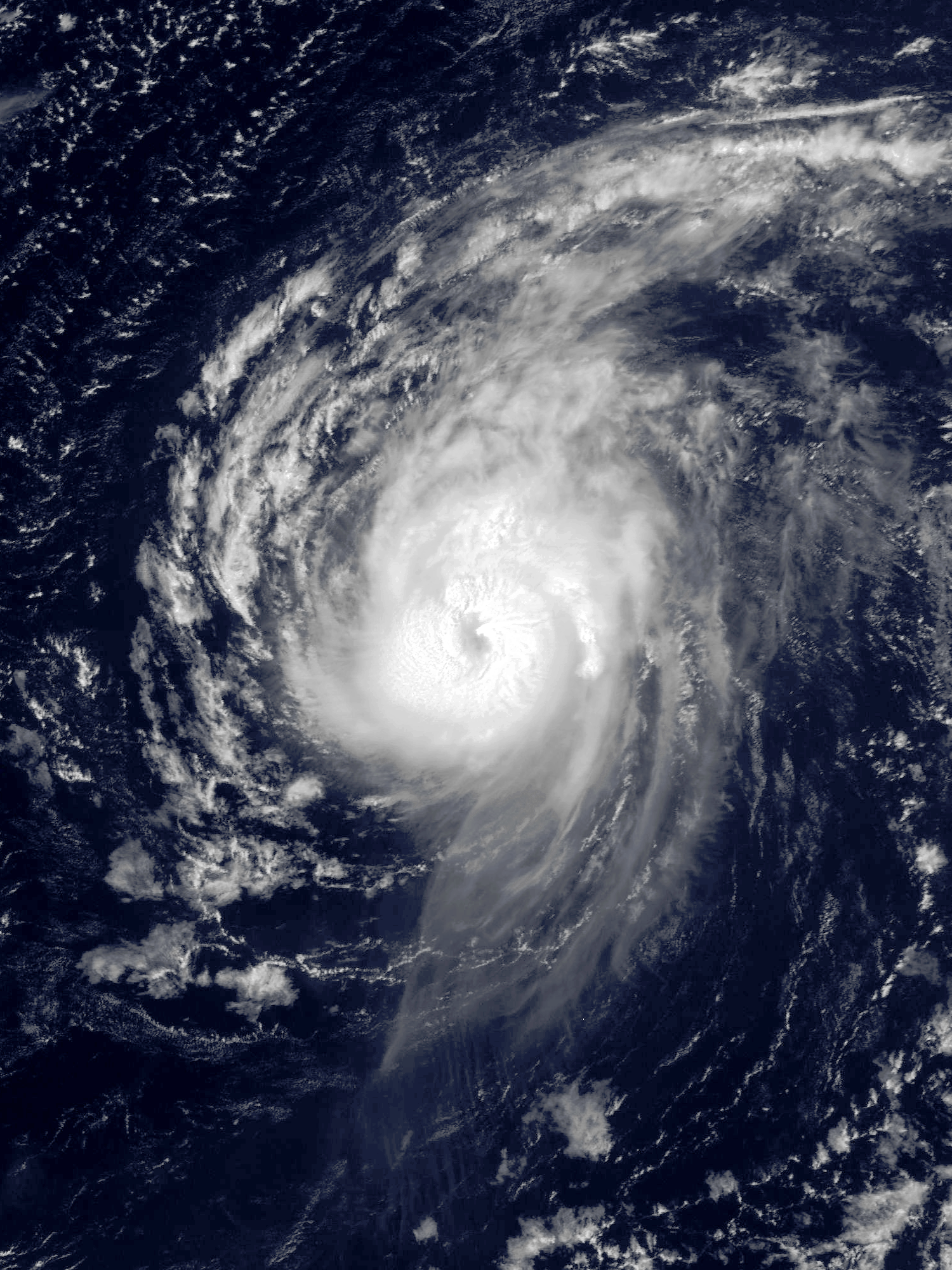
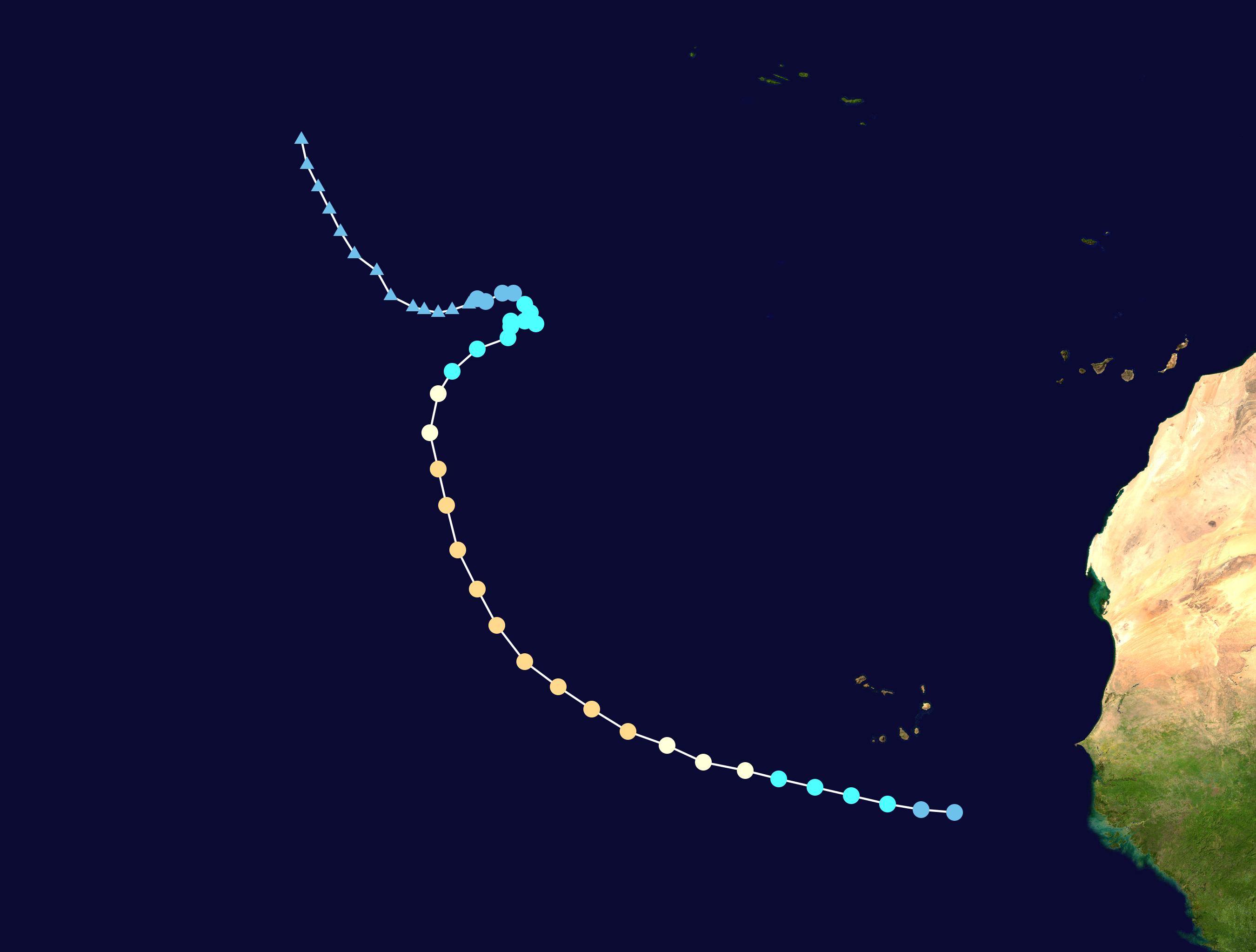
- Duration: August 13 – August 21
- Peak intensity: 110 mph (175 km/h) (1-min); 964 mbar (hPa)

A tropical wave developed into Tropical Depression Four while south-southeast of Cape Verde on August 13. Although sea surface temperatures were only marginally warm, the depression strengthened into Tropical Storm Danielle early on August 14. Further intensification occurred and by early on August 15, Danielle reached hurricane status. The storm deepened significantly over the next 24 hours and became a Category 2 hurricane. Later on August 16, Danielle peaked as strong Category 2 hurricane with winds of 110 mph (180 km/h) and a minimum barometric pressure of 964 mbar (28.5 inHg).

At the time of peak intensity on August 16, Danielle was heading northward to north-northwestward because of a subtropical ridge. Shortly thereafter, southwesterly vertical shear began increasing, causing the hurricane to weaken. Mid-level flow associated with a diffluent trough caused Danielle to move northeastward on August 18. Later that day Danielle deteriorated to a Category 1 hurricane, hours before being downgraded to a tropical storm. On August 19, Danielle became nearly stationary and moved erratically while southwest of the Azores. Eventually, the storm curved west-southwestward and weakened to a tropical depression on August 20. About 24 hours later, Danielle degenerated into a remnant low-pressure area. The remnant low moved westward and then to the north-northwest, before dissipating about 795 mi (1,279 km) west-southwest of the westernmost islands of the Azores.

=== Tropical Storm Earl ===
- Tropical storm (SSHWS)
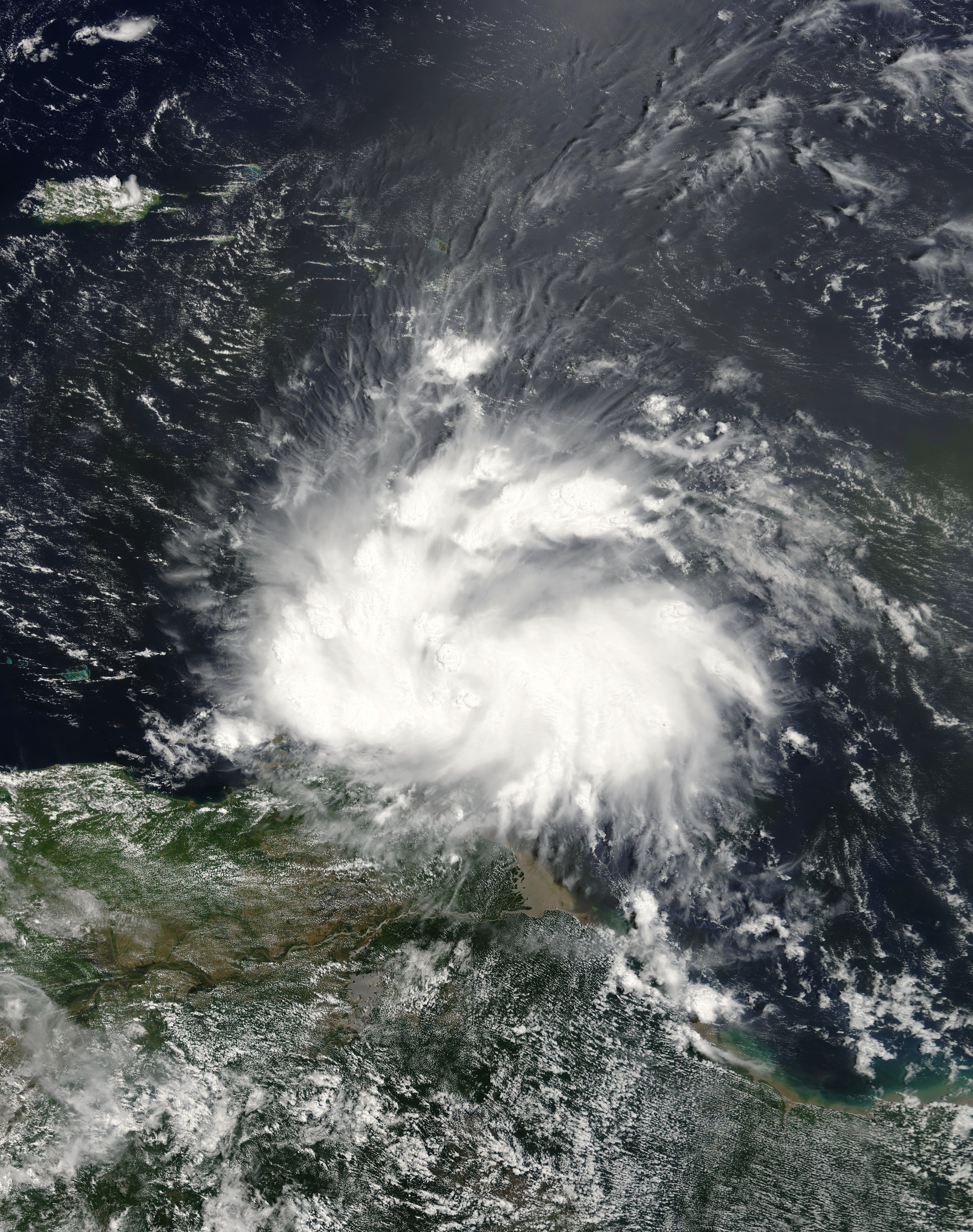
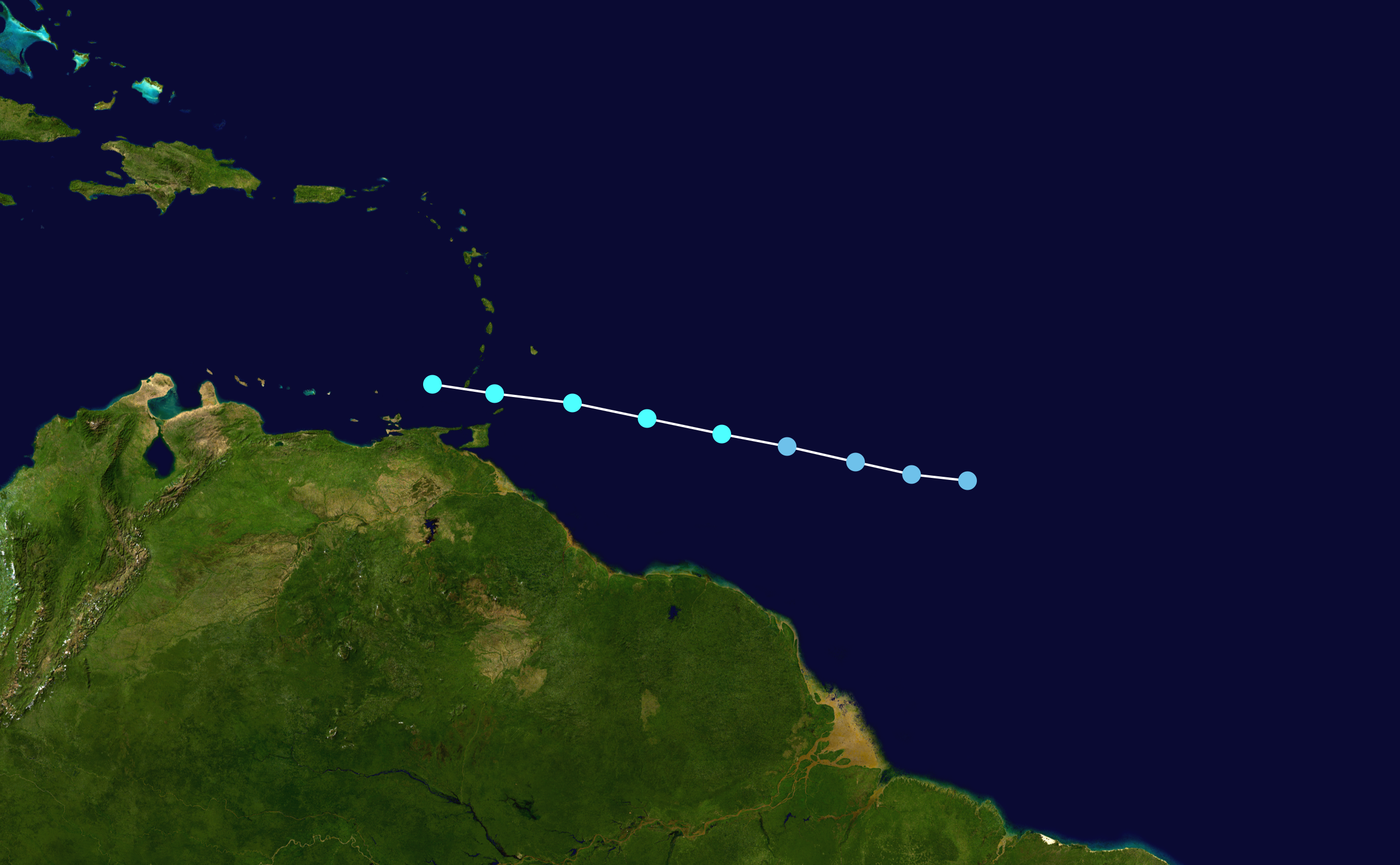
- Duration: August 13 – August 15
- Peak intensity: 50 mph (85 km/h) (1-min); 1009 mbar (hPa)

A low-latitude, vigorous tropical wave that emerged off the western coast of Africa on August 10. As the disturbance moved towards the west, satellite imagery revealed a better structure with improved banding features and fair upper-level outflow, leading to the formation of Tropical Depression Five at 1800 UTC on August 13, situated roughly 1000 mi (1610 km) east of the Lesser Antilles. The depression progressed rapidly west-northwest the following day, embedded and under the influence of a deep easterly flow around the southern periphery of a subtropical ridge to the cyclone's north. By the afternoon of August 14, the depression strengthened into Tropical Storm Earl, situated 325 mi (525 km/h) east of Barbados. Within an environment characterized by low wind shear, high atmospheric humidity, and warm sea surface temperatures, Earl intensified, reaching a peak intensity of 50 mph (85 km/h) by 0600 UTC on August 15. However, Earl degenerated into an tropical wave and dissipated shortly after passing through the Leeward Islands, possibly due to its fast forward motion. The remnant wave eventually entered the eastern Pacific Ocean, developing into Hurricane Frank on August 23.

Tropical storm warnings were issued from Trinidad to St. Lucia, leading to airport closures across the region. Hundreds of people evacuated to shelters in Grenada. In Grenada, Earl produced heavy rains and strong winds. The winds damaged the roofs of 34 homes, while also knocking down trees and power lines. Heavy rains triggered flooding as well as nine mudslides and three rockslides. On St Vincent and the Grenadines, the winds destroyed two roofs and also damaged banana trees. In Tobago, wind damage to trees and power lines cut power to 90% of the island. Winds reached 35 mph (55 km/h) in Barbados and St. Lucia.

=== Hurricane Frances ===
- Category 4 hurricane (SSHWS)
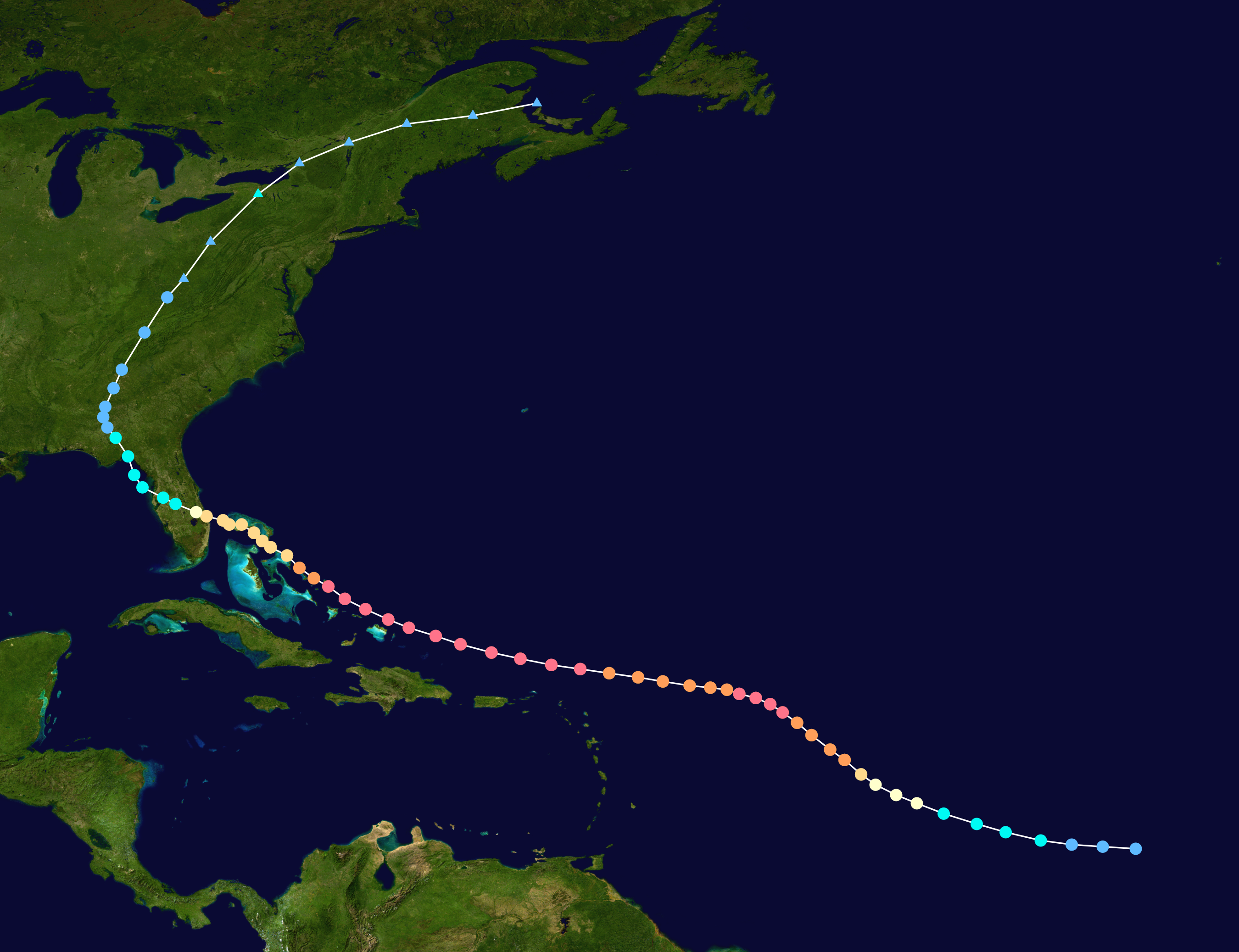
- Duration: August 24 – September 8
- Peak intensity: 145 mph (230 km/h) (1-min); 935 mbar (hPa)

Around 00:00 UTC on August 24, a tropical wave developed into Tropical Depression Six, while located about 755 mi (1,215 km) west-southwest of the southernmost islands of Cape Verde. Moving west-northwestward, the depression strengthened into Tropical Storm Frances later that day. Frances reached hurricane status late on August 25 while curving northwestward. By August 28, the storm reached an initial peak intensity as a Category 4 hurricane with winds of 130 mph (210 km/h). Late the following day, Frances weakened to a Category 3 hurricane during an eyewall replacement cycle. However, by August 31, the storm re-intensified into a Category 4 hurricane and attained its maximum sustained wind speed of 145 mph (233 km/h). Although approaching the Bahamas, wind shear and increasing westerly winds aloft caused Frances to weaken to a Category 3 hurricane late on September 2.

At 19:30 UTC on September 2, the system made landfall on San Salvador Island with winds of 125 mph (201 km/h). Early the next day, Frances struck Cat Island while somewhat weaker. The system decelerated and weakened slightly to a Category 2 hurricane before landfall in Eleuthera hours later. By September 4, Frances made another landfall on Grand Bahama with winds of 105 mph (169 km/h). Moving slowly west-northwestward, the hurricane made landfall in Hutchinson Island, Florida at the same intensity, early on September 5. Rapidly weakening, Frances fell to Category 1 intensity around midday and deteriorated to a tropical storm about six hours later. On September 6, the storm emerged into the Gulf of Mexico near New Port Richey, before another landfall at the mouth of the Aucilla River with winds of 65 mph (105 km/h). Early on September 7, Frances weakened to a tropical depression over Georgia. By late the next day, the system became extratropical, though the remnants persisted until dissipation over the Gulf of Saint Lawrence on September 11.

In the Bahamas, about 75% of residents lost electricity. Between 13 and 17 percent of the non-native Australian pine on San Salvador Island experienced damage, primarily from snapping, though some browning from salt spray was noted. Several feet of water flooded the international airport at Freeport. Insured losses reached about $300 million. Severe damage was also dealt to banana, corn, and pineapple crops. About 4,160 homes received minor damage, while 2,522 houses were rendered uninhabitable or destroyed. About 700 people were left homeless. Additionally, sea walls, schools, bridges, roads, and docks were damaged. Strong winds brought severe damage to Florida, especially counties along the east coast. Hundreds of homes, mobile homes, and businesses were destroyed in Indian River, Martin, and St. Lucie counties, and damage was inflicted on thousands of other structures there. In the tri-county area alone, damage totaled approximately $4.5 billion. Palm Beach County also suffered particularly severely, with 15,000 houses and 2,400 businesses damaged there. About 4.27 million customers were left without electricity in Florida. Frances and its remnants brought extensive flooding to other states, especially in Georgia, North Carolina, Ohio, and Pennsylvania. The storm spawned 101 tornadoes in the United States, with 45 in South Carolina alone. Damage in the United States totaled approximately $9.8 billion, placing Frances among the costliest hurricanes in the country. Overall, the storm caused 49 deaths, two each in the Bahamas and Ohio, eight in Georgia, and thirty-seven in Florida.

=== Hurricane Gaston ===
- Category 1 hurricane (SSHWS)
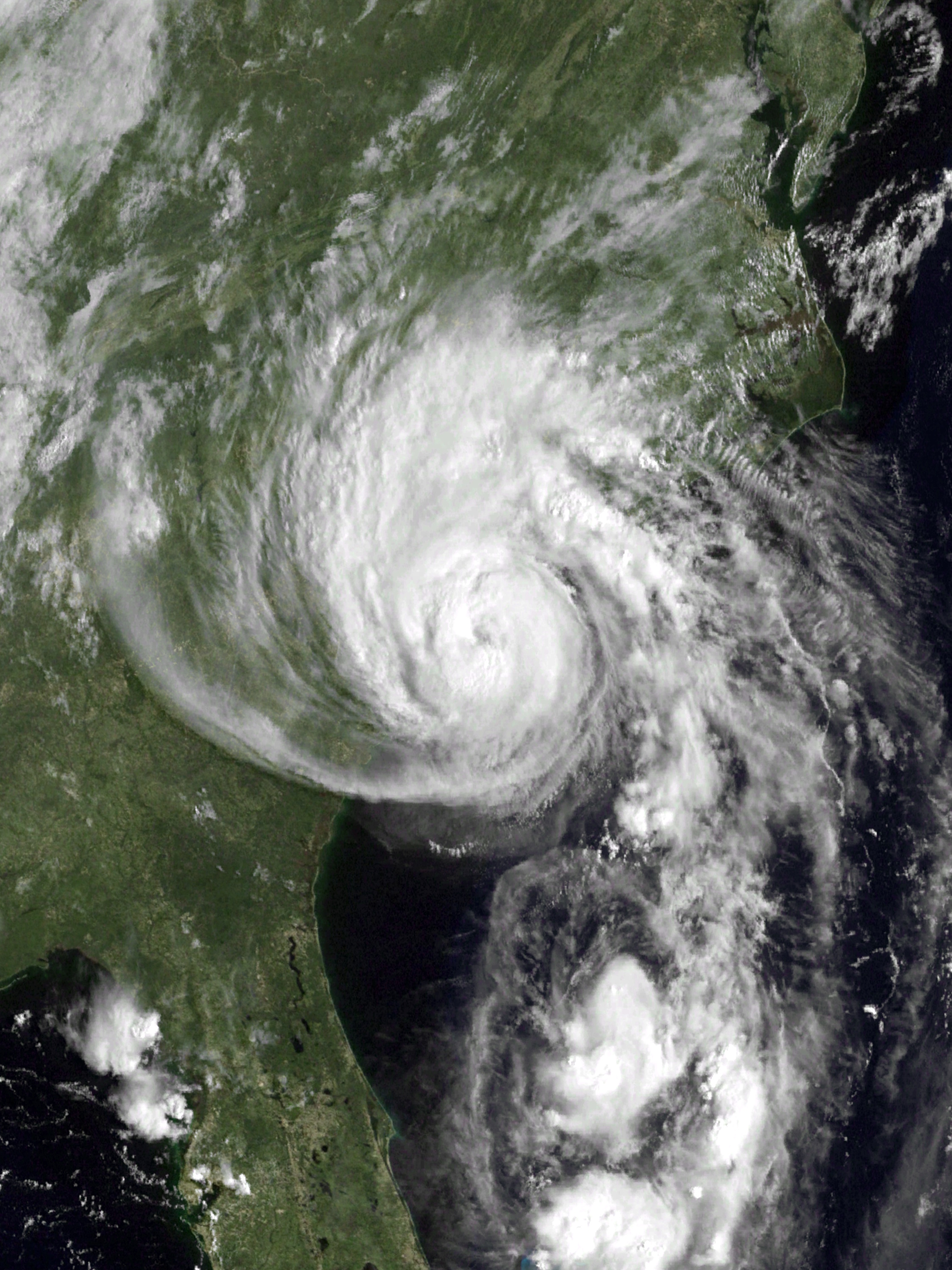
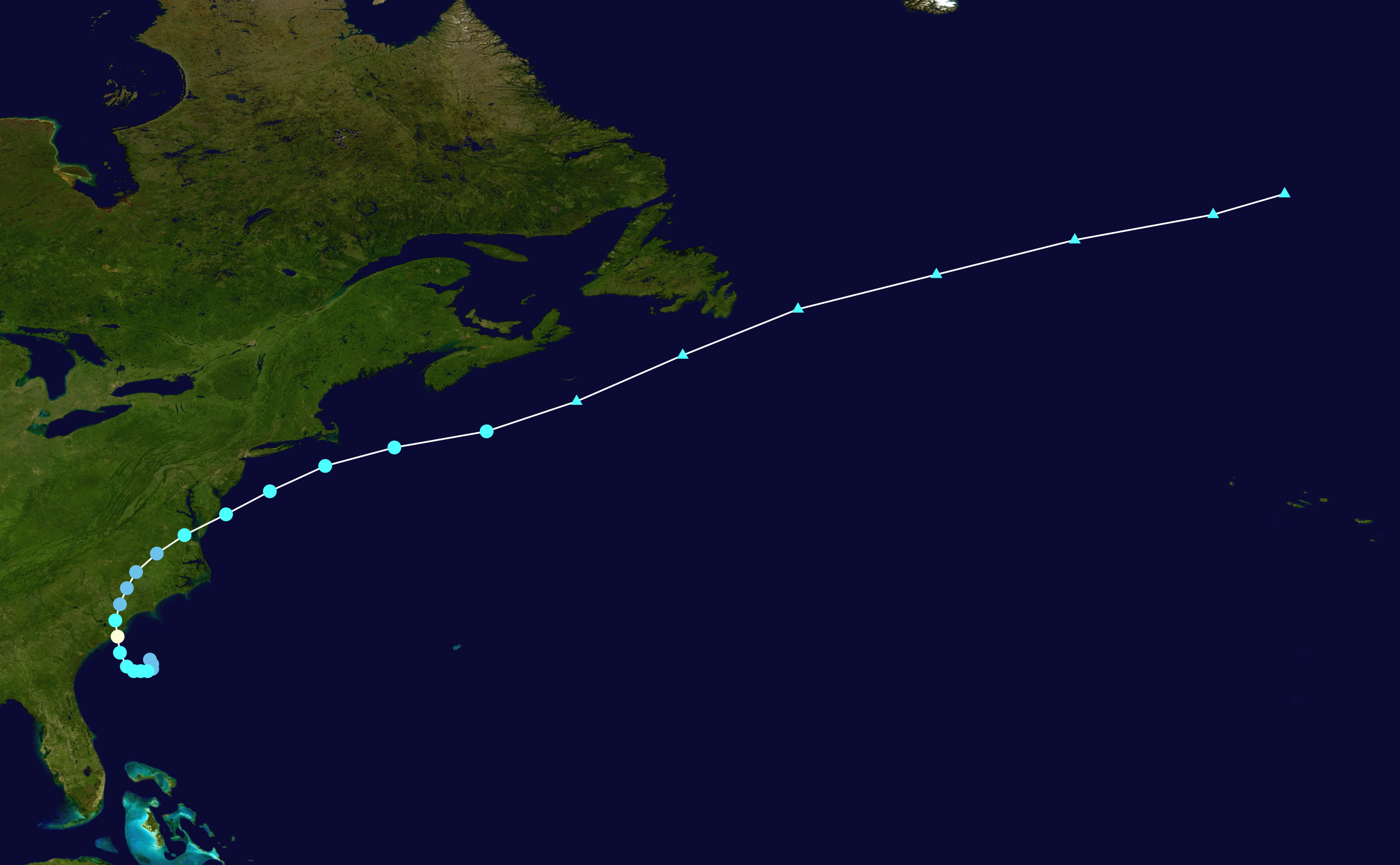
- Duration: August 27 – September 1
- Peak intensity: 75 mph (120 km/h) (1-min); 985 mbar (hPa)

A frontal low-pressure area developed into Tropical Depression Seven at 12:00 UTC on August 27, while located about 130 mi (210 km) east-southeast of Charleston, South Carolina. The depression gradually strengthened and was upgraded to Tropical Storm Gaston early on August 28. Initially, Gaston tracked slowly, moving southeastward and then westward, before a developing mid- to upper-level ridge re-curved the storm northwestward. Gaston strengthened and briefly became a hurricane at 12:00 UTC on August 29, although operationally it was thought to have peaked as a strong tropical storm. Two hours later, the storm made landfall near Awendaw, South Carolina with winds of 75 mph (121 km/h). Gaston weakened rapidly inland and was only a tropical depression by early on August 30. Gaston re-strengthened into a tropical storm while located over eastern Virginia on August 31, just hours before emerging into the Atlantic. Gaston re-intensified slightly further, but became extratropical near Sable Island on September 1.

In South Carolina, an unofficial measurement indicated wind gusts up to 82 mph (132 km/h) in South Capers Island, which is near Parris Island. Strong winds destroyed eight homes, damaged more than 3,000 buildings, and left more than 150,000 people without power. Additionally, flash flooding further inland severely damaged or destroyed at least 20 homes in Berkeley County. In North Carolina, widespread street flooding occurred, including inundation of portions of Interstates 40 and 95. Several trees were downed by strong winds, especially in Chatham and Johnston counties. A tornado in Hoke County damaged several homes. Severe flooding occurred in east-central Virginia due to rainfall amounts up to 12.6 in (320 mm). In Chesterfield, Dinwiddie, Hanover, Henrico, and Prince George counties, 350 homes and 230 businesses were damaged or destroyed, and many roads were closed due to high water. In Richmond, more than 120 roads were closed, including a portion of Interstate 95. There were nine fatalities. Throughout the United States, Gaston caused about $130 million in damage. The remnants produced light rainfall in Nova Scotia, Newfoundland, and Sable Island.

=== Tropical Storm Hermine ===
- Tropical storm (SSHWS)
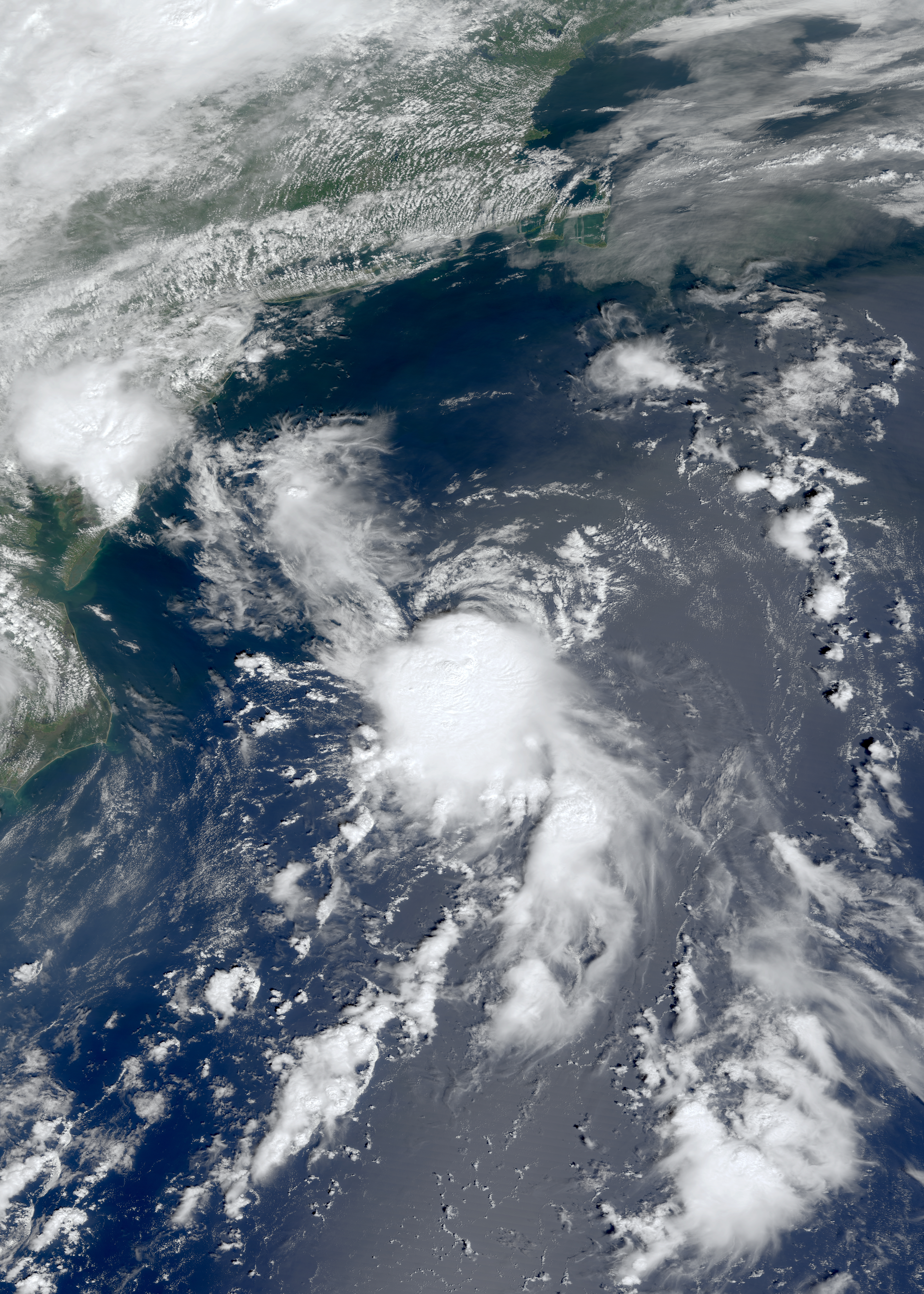
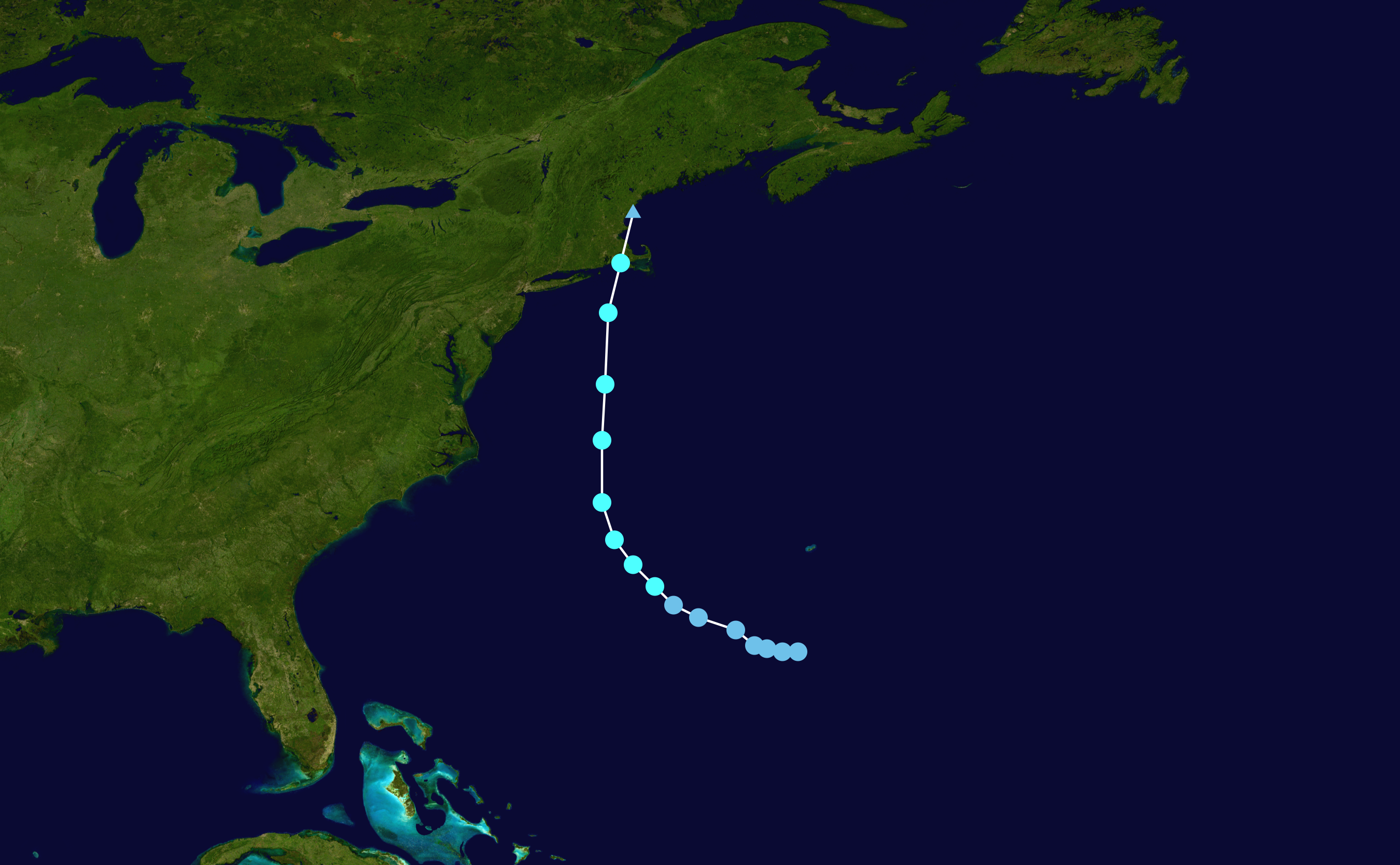
- Duration: August 27 – August 31
- Peak intensity: 60 mph (95 km/h) (1-min); 1002 mbar (hPa)

The frontal zone that spawned Hurricane Gaston developed an area of convection south of Bermuda on August 25. After detaching from the front and developing a circulation, the system became a tropical depression at 18:00 UTC on August 27. It initially remained weak while the convection fluctuated, until intensifying into Tropical Storm Hermine at 12:00 UTC on August 29. Later that day, wind shear exposed the circulation to the north of the convection, though the storm was able to a peak as a 60 mph (97 km/h) tropical storm on August 30. The storm turned northward under the steering currents of a subtropical ridge. Increased wind shear from Gaston weakened Hermine. By late on August 30, the circulation was entirely exposed from the convection.

Early on August 31, Hermine made landfall near New Bedford, Massachusetts as a minimal tropical storm. It rapidly weakened while moving northward, and after becoming extratropical, Hermine was absorbed by a frontal zone later that day. The storm brought tropical storm force winds and light rainfall to eastern Massachusetts, reaching about 0.5 in (13 mm) on Cape Cod. The remnants of Hermine tracked across New Brunswick and produced locally heavy rainfall, peaking at about 2.36 in (60 mm). In Moncton, minor basement flooding and street closures were reported.

=== Hurricane Ivan ===
- Category 5 hurricane (SSHWS)
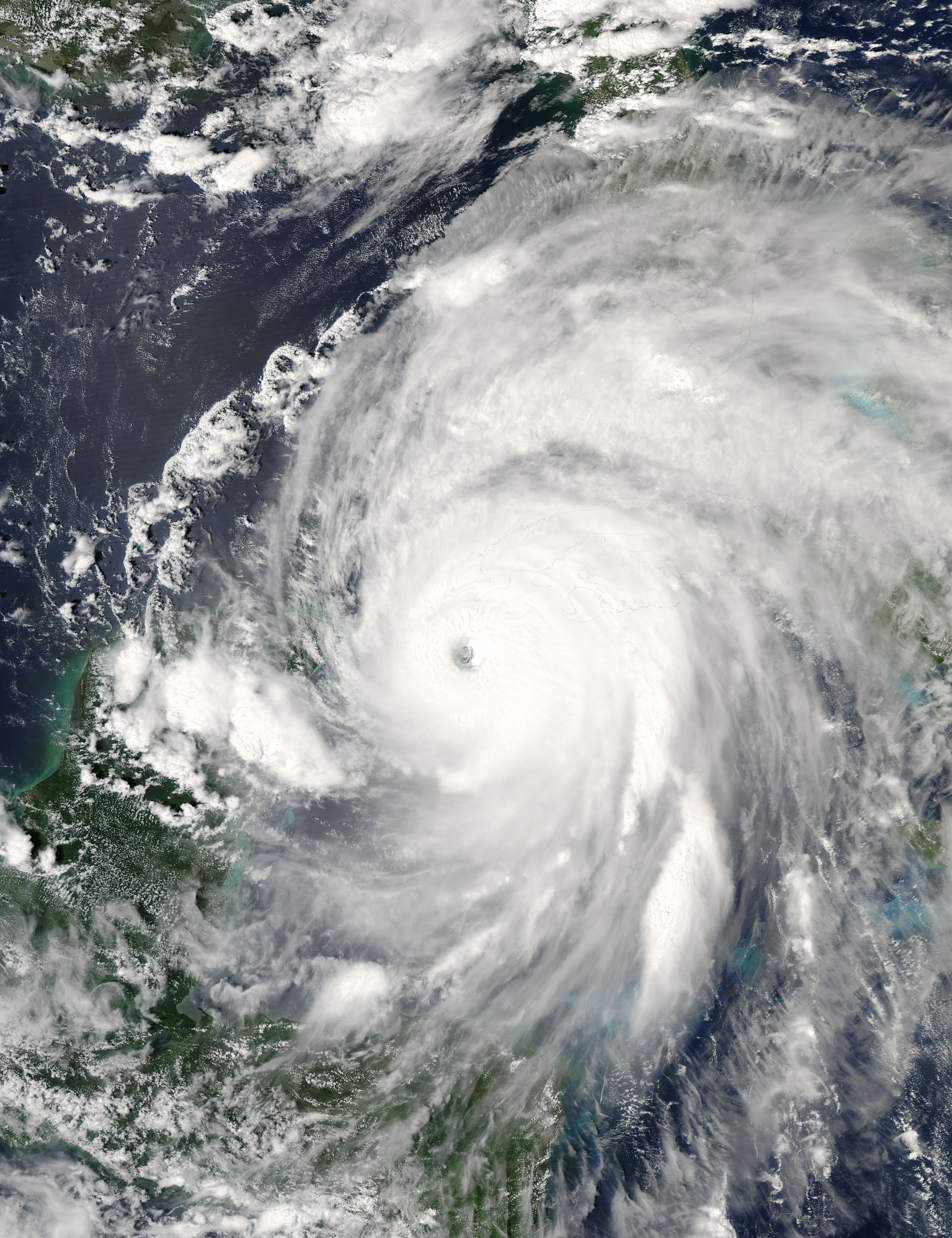
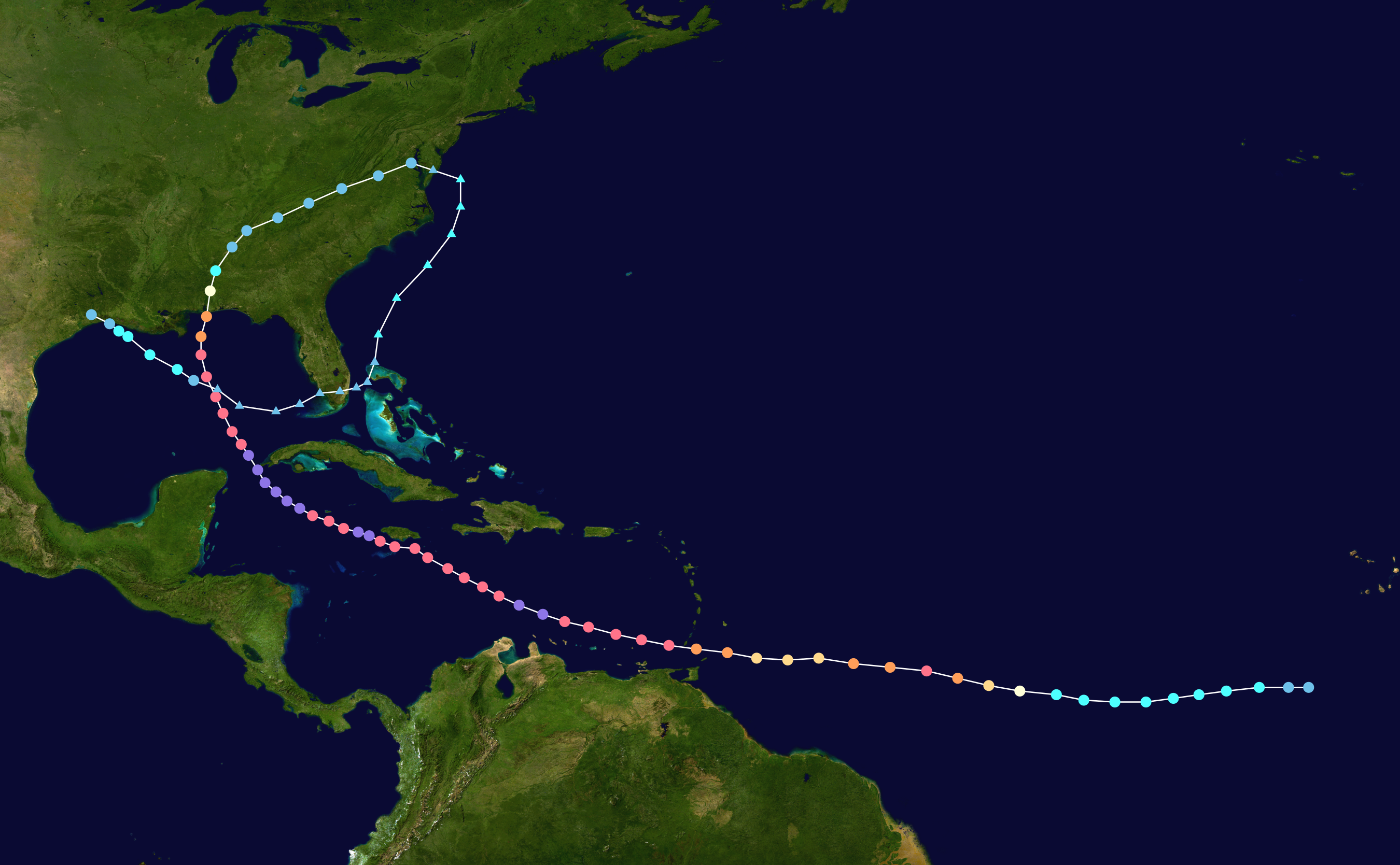
- Duration: September 2 – September 24
- Peak intensity: 165 mph (270 km/h) (1-min); 910 mbar (hPa)

A westward-moving tropical wave developed into a tropical depression on September 2, before becoming Tropical Storm Ivan on the following day. Tracking westward, Ivan gradually strengthened, reaching hurricane intensity on September 5. On September 6, the storm strengthened significantly, becoming a Category 4 hurricane, despite being located at an unusually low latitude. It subsequently weakened, though it reached major hurricane status again the next day. Late on September 7, Ivan passed close to Grenada while heading west-northwestward. Although located near the Netherlands Antilles on September 9, Ivan briefly became a Category 5 hurricane. During the next five days, Ivan fluctuated between a Category 4 and 5 hurricane. The storm passed south of Jamaica on September 11 and then the Cayman Islands on the next day. Although curving northwestward, Ivan brushed western Cuba as a Category 5 hurricane on September 14.

Shortly after moving to the west of Cuba on September 14, Ivan entered the Gulf of Mexico. Over the next two days, the storm gradually weakened while tracking north-northwestward and northward. At 06:50 UTC on September 16, Ivan made landfall near Gulf Shores, Alabama with winds of 120 mph (190 km/h). It quickly weakened inland, falling to tropical storm status later that day and tropical depression strength by early on September 17. The storm curved northeastward and eventually reached the Delmarva Peninsula, where it became extratropical on September 18. The remnants of Ivan moved southward and then southwestward, crossing Florida on September 21 and re-entering the Gulf of Mexico later that day. Late on September 22, the remnants regenerated into Ivan in the central Gulf of Mexico as a tropical depression, shortly before re-strengthening into a tropical storm. After reaching winds of 65 mph (105 km/h), wind shear weakened Ivan back to a tropical depression on September 24. Shortly thereafter, Ivan made a final landfall near Holly Beach, Louisiana with winds of 35 mph (56 km/h) and subsequently dissipated hours later.

Throughout the Lesser Antilles and in Venezuela, Ivan caused 44 deaths and slightly more than $1.15 billion in losses, with nearly all of the damage and fatalities in Grenada. Although Ivan was passing south of Hispaniola, the outer bands of the storm caused four deaths in the Dominican Republic. In Jamaica, high winds and heavy rainfall left $360 million in damage and killed 17 people. The storm brought strong winds to the Cayman Islands, resulting in two deaths and $3.5 billion in damage. In Cuba, a combination of rainfall, storm surge, and winds resulted in $1.2 billion in damage, but no fatalities. Heavy damage was reported along the Gulf Coast of the United States. Along the waterfront of Escambia and Santa Rosa counties in Florida, nearly every structure was impacted. In the former, 10,000 roofs were damaged or destroyed. About 4,600 homes were demolished in the county. Similar impact occurred in Alabama. Property damage was major along Perdido Bay, Big Lagoon, Bayou Grande, Pensacola Bay and Escambia Bay. A number of homes were completely washed away by the high surge. Further inland, thousands of other houses were damaged or destroyed in many counties. Ivan produced a record tornado outbreak, with at least 119 twisters spawned collectively in nine states. Throughout the United States, the hurricane left 54 fatalities and $20.5 billion in damage. Six deaths were also reported in Atlantic Canada.

=== Tropical Depression Ten ===
- Tropical depression (SSHWS)
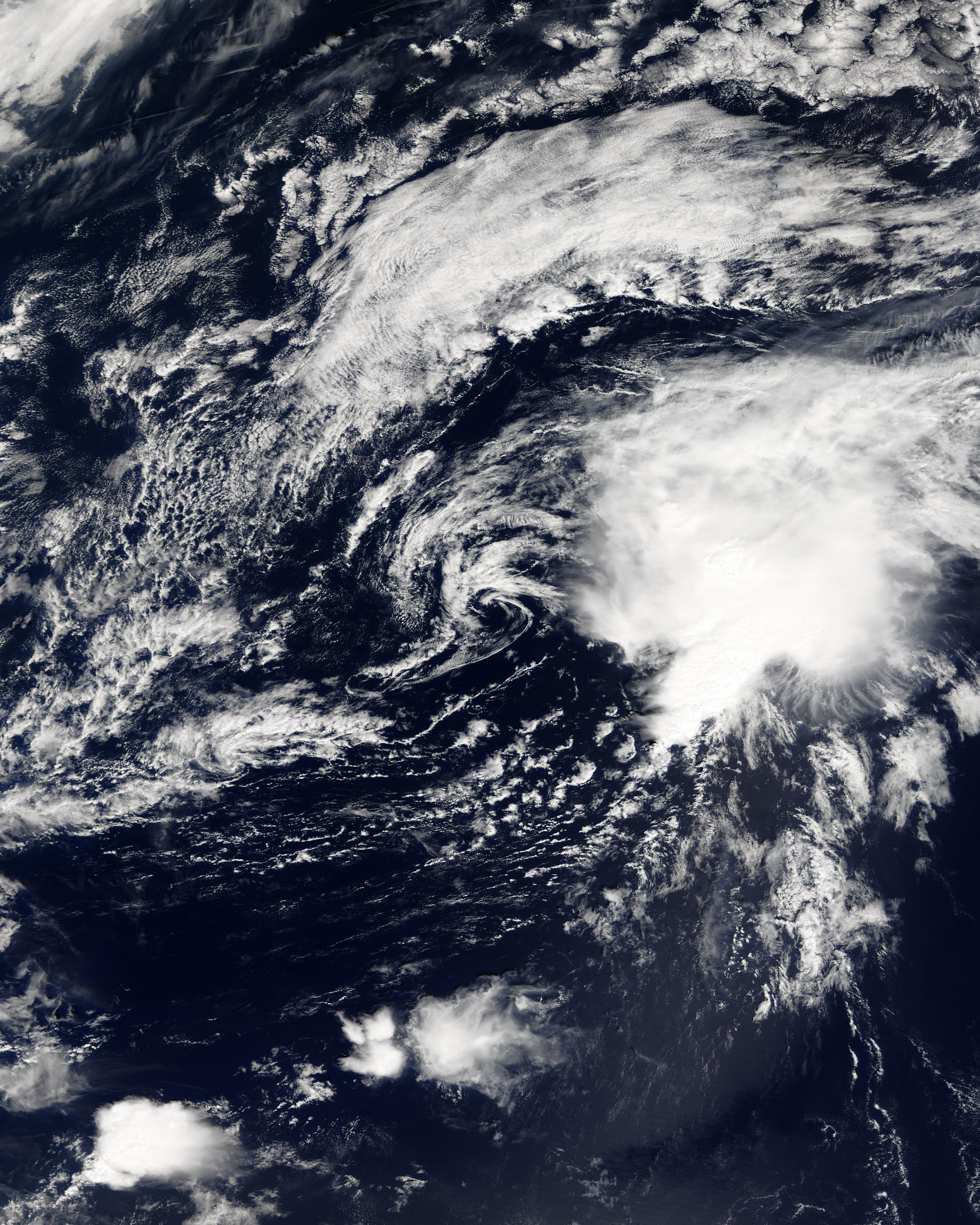
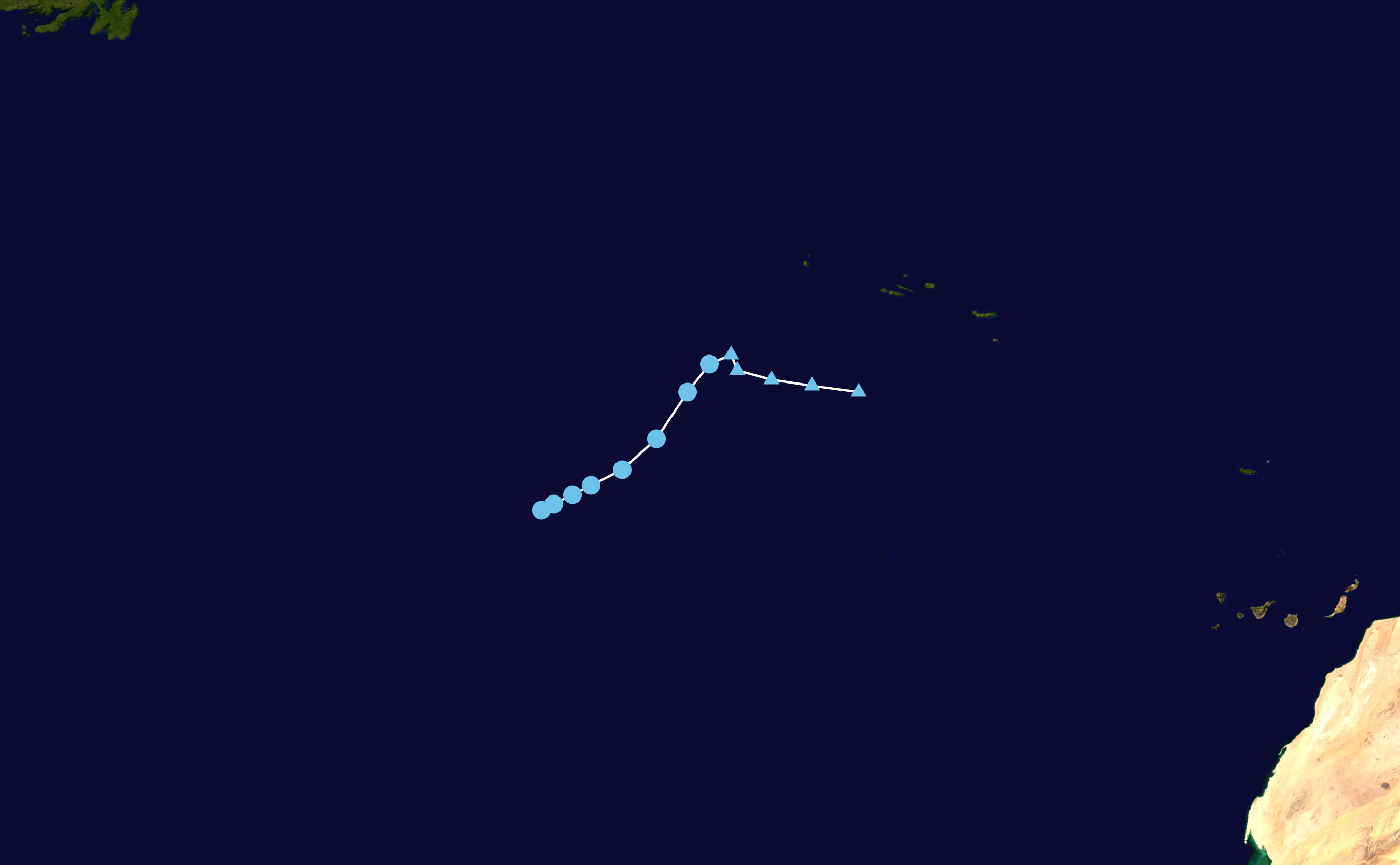
- Duration: September 7 – September 9
- Peak intensity: 35 mph (55 km/h) (1-min); 1009 mbar (hPa)

A tropical wave accompanied with a well-organized area of convection emerged off the western coast of Africa on August 29. Performing a slow curve over the eastern Atlantic, the wave became increasingly less-defined over subsequent days as a result of strong southwesterly wind shear. Following the development of shower and thunderstorm activity near the center, the system acquired enough organization to be deemed a tropical depression at 12:00 UTC on September 7, while positioned about 725 mi (1,167 km) southwest of the southernmost Azores. Hostile environmental conditions caused the depression to remain below tropical storm intensity and subsequently degenerate into a remnant low by 12:00 UTC on September 9 after the center decoupled from the remainder of the convective activity. The low-level circulation persisted near the Azores until dissipating the following day.

=== Hurricane Jeanne ===
- Category 3 hurricane (SSHWS)
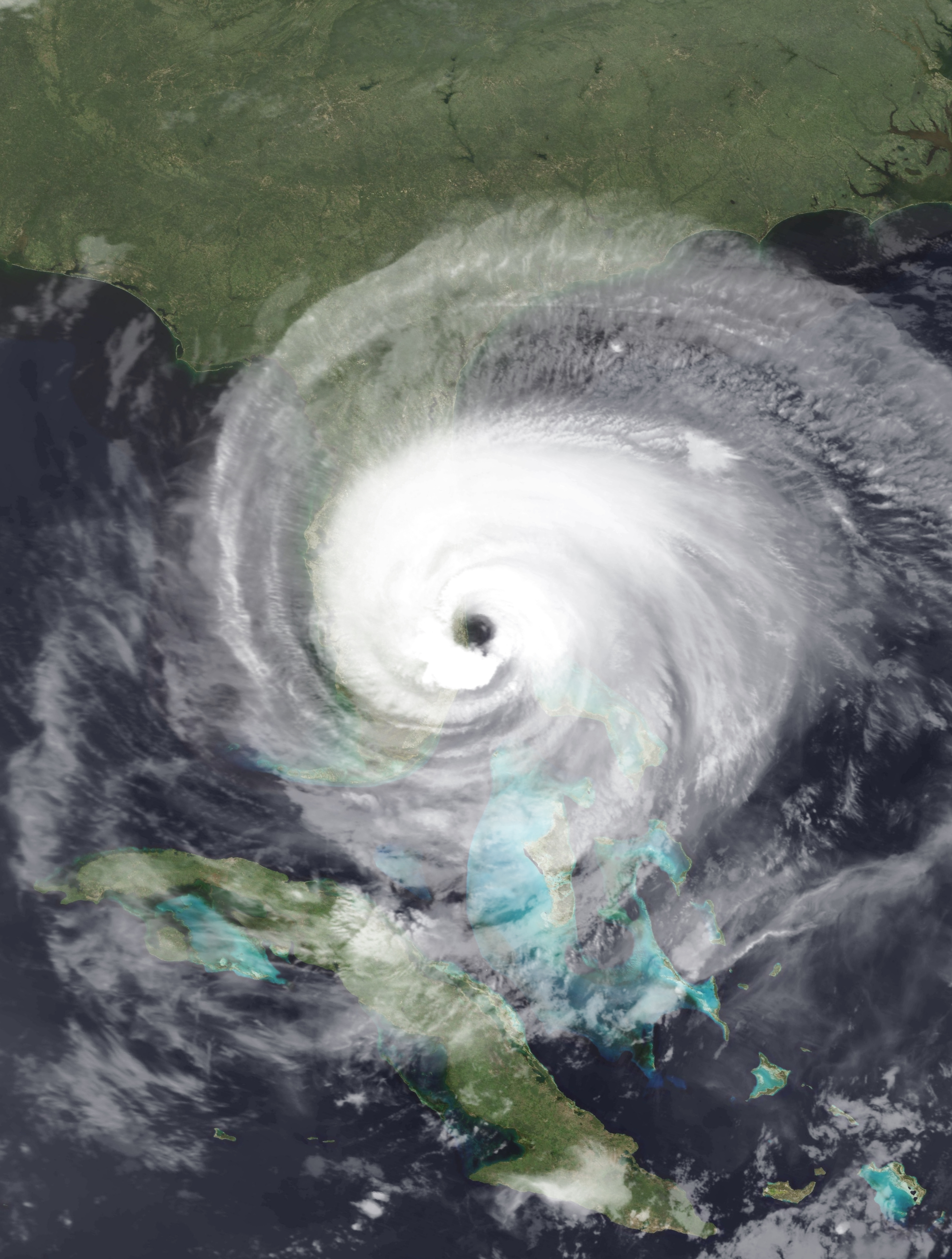
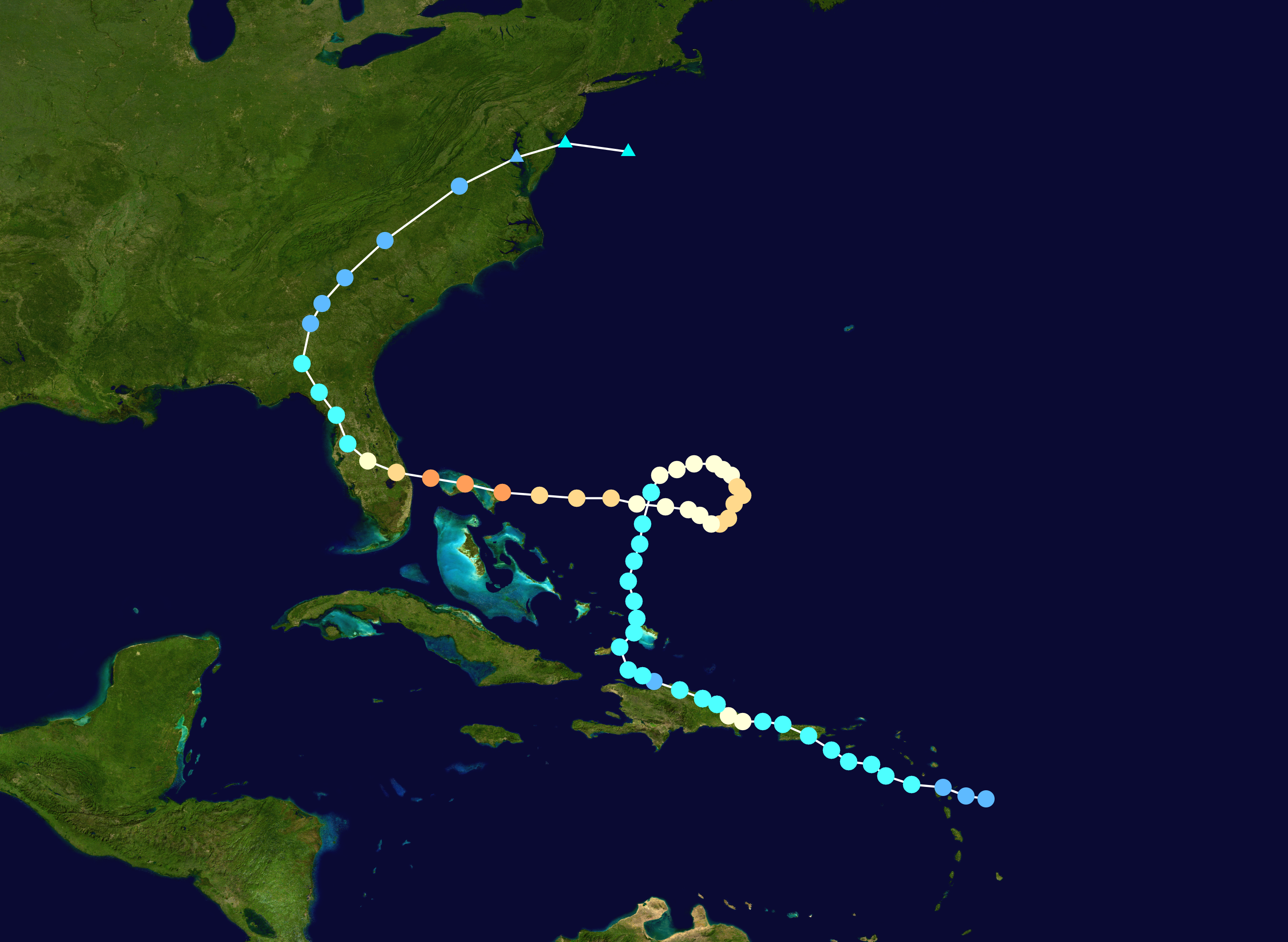
- Duration: September 13 – September 28
- Peak intensity: 120 mph (195 km/h) (1-min); 950 mbar (hPa)

Tropical Depression Eleven developed from a tropical wave at 18:00 UTC on September 13, while located about 70 mi (110 km) east-southeast of Guadeloupe. After crossing the island while moving west-northwestward, the depression intensified into Tropical Storm Jeanne around midday on September 14. It strengthened further in the Caribbean Sea, before making landfall near Guayama, Puerto Rico with winds of 70 mph (110 km/h) at 16:00 UTC the following day. Hours later, Jeanne emerged into the Mona Passage and resumed deepening, becoming at Category 1 hurricane at midday on September 16. Around that time, the hurricane made another landfall at the eastern tip of Dominican Republic with winds of 80 mph (130 km/h). By early on September 17, Jeanne weakened to a tropical storm due to its slow movement over the rough terrain of Hispaniola, and briefly fell to tropical depression intensity at 18:00 UTC. After re-emerging into the Atlantic, the storm then moved generally northward. After the system passed between the eastern Bahamas and Turks and Caicos Islands on September 18, slow re-intensification occurred.

Late on September 20, Jeanne again became a Category 1 hurricane; around that time, it began to execute an anti-cyclonic loop. The storm moved eastward, before a trough of low pressure caused Jeanne to curve southeastward. Early on September 22, the system strengthened into a Category 2 hurricane. A deep-layer ridge slowly curved Jeanne to the west by the following day, around the time it weakened to a Category 1 hurricane due to upwelled waters. However, the storm began re-intensifying on September 24, becoming a Category 2 hurricane again that day and a Category 3 by September 25. At 14:00 UTC on the latter, Jeanne struck the Abaco Islands in the Bahamas with winds of 115 mph (185 km/h). The hurricane strengthened slightly further, peaking with maximum sustained winds of 120 mph (190 km/h). Jeanne made its final landfall on Hutchinson Island, Florida at the same time around 04:00 UTC on September 26. It quickly weakened after moving inland and fell to tropical storm intensity only 14 hours later. Curving northward, Jeanne decayed to a tropical depression over Georgia late on September 27. Jeanne turned northeastward and became extratropical over Virginia after about 24 hours. The remnants briefly re-strengthened after moving offshore the Delmarva Peninsula, but dissipated late on September 29.

In Guadeloupe, rainfall amounts up to 11.81 in (300 mm) caused flooding and mudslides throughout the island. Many roads and bridges were inundated or washed out. About 470 homes were damaged or destroyed. Similar impact was reported in Puerto Rico, with heavy precipitation causing flooding and mudslides. There was also heavy damage to crops, schools, houses, and businesses. Strong wind gusts left 70% of the island without power. Jeanne resulted in $169.9 million in damage and eight deaths. In Dominican Republic, major flooding was reported, with rivers overflowing, bridges collapsing, roads cut off, damage to agriculture, and mudslides. Strong winds disrupted telephone services and caused power outages. Overall, hundreds of people became homeless and there was 23 deaths and $270 million in damage. Up to 13 in (330 mm) of rain fell on the mountainous region of Haiti, causing extreme flooding and mudslides, especially in the Gonaïves area. Over 200,000 people were left homeless and an estimated 3,006 fatalities occurred. In the Bahamas, communications were disrupted and some homes were inundated by storm surge in the Abaco Islands. Similar impact was reported on Grand Bahama, with several houses and the airport being flooded. Further, winds tore-off and damaged a number of roofs. Throughout the state of Florida, strong winds were observed, leaving approximately 3.44 million people without electricity. Additionally, more than 101,611 homes were impacted by the storm, almost 14,000 of which severely or beyond repairs. Several other states experienced severe flooding. Overall, there were five deaths and about $7.5 billion in damage in the United States.

=== Hurricane Karl ===
- Category 4 hurricane (SSHWS)
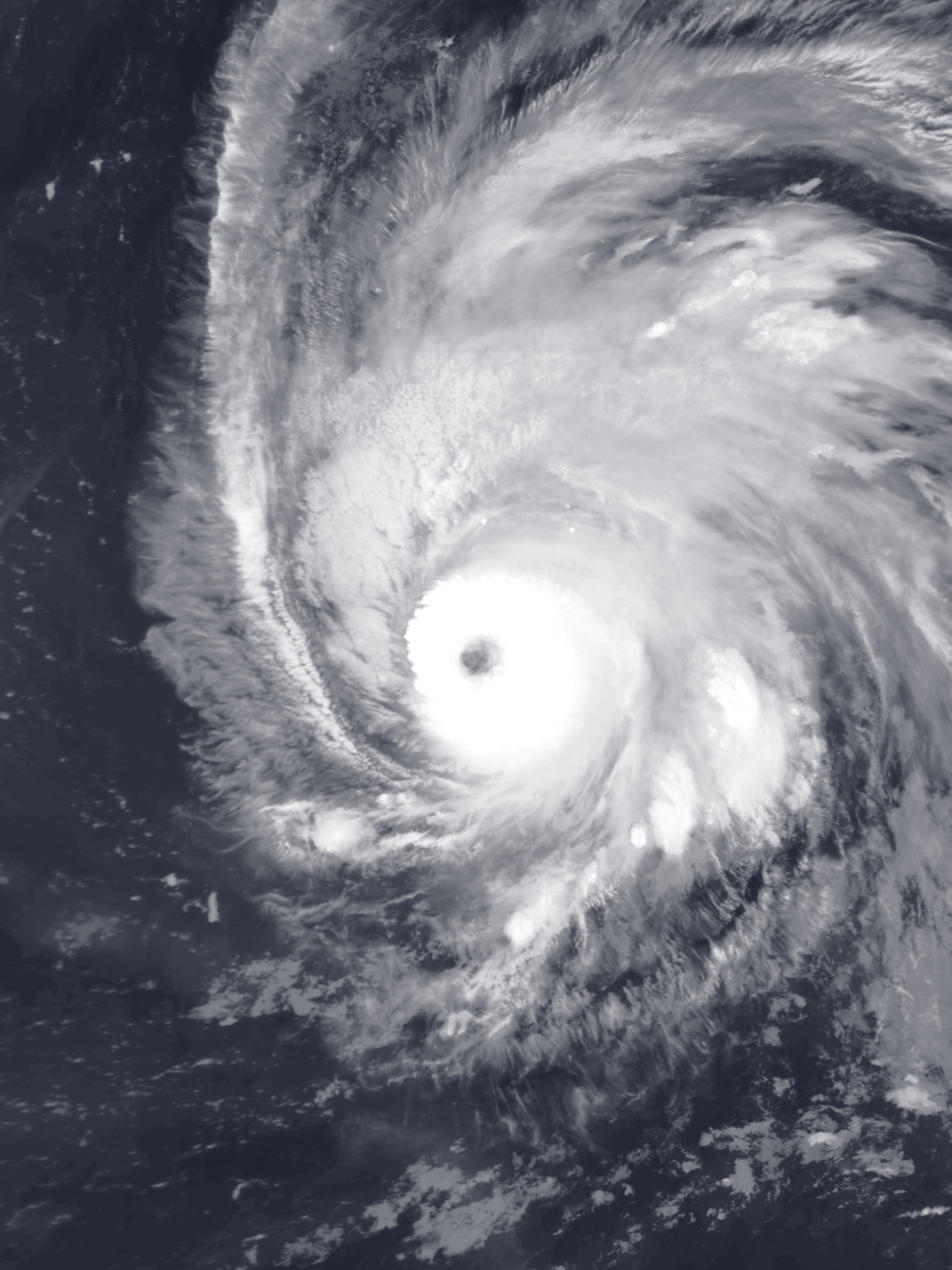
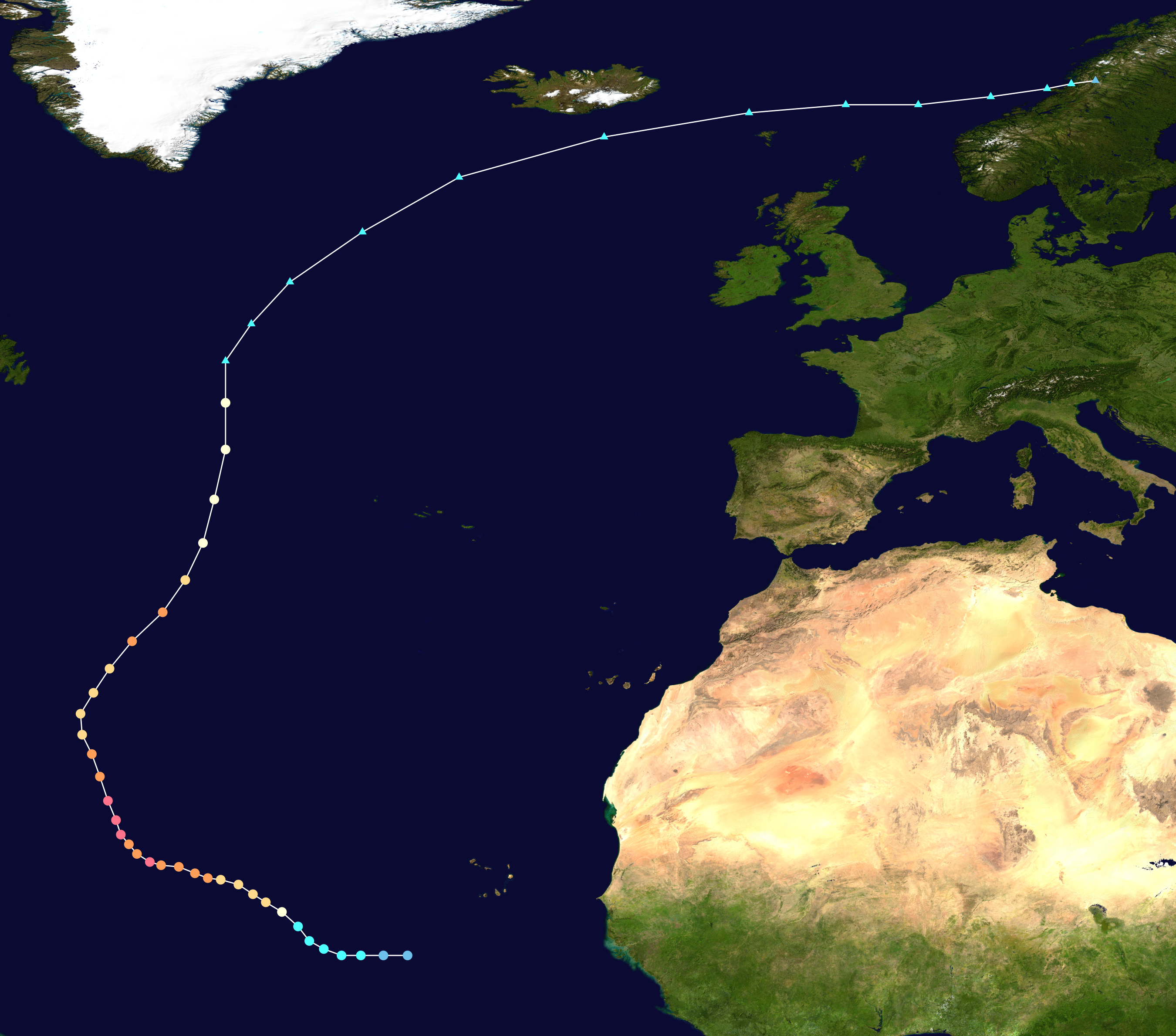
- Duration: September 16 – September 24
- Peak intensity: 145 mph (230 km/h) (1-min); 938 mbar (hPa)

A strong tropical wave exited the coast of Africa on September 13 and proceeded westward. The wave gradually became better organized, and the NHC designated it Tropical Depression Twelve on September 16, while the system was located about 670 miles (1,080 km) west-southwest of the Cape Verde islands. That afternoon, the depression was upgraded to Tropical Storm Karl. Due to healthy outflow around an upper-level anticyclone and warm sea surface temperatures of the year, rapid deepening began on the evening of September 17, with the storm developing a small eye. Karl intensified into a hurricane early on September 18. Late in the evening of September 18, Karl attained Category 3 status, becoming the sixth major hurricane of 2004. On September 19, Karl continued to strengthen while maintaining a well-defined eye, moving northwestward across the open Atlantic. The storm briefly deepened to a Category 4 hurricane on September 20, before weakening slightly and subsequently re-strengthening to that intensity. With a steadily increasing wind field, Karl peaked with maximum sustained winds of 145 mph (233 km/h) early on September 21 while resuming a northwestward motion.

After reaching its peak intensity, Karl weakened due to increasing wind shear, as well as an eyewall replacement cycle. The hurricane weakened to a Category 2 hurricane on September 22 as it curved to the northeast in response to a baroclinic trough. After wind shear lessened, Karl briefly became a major hurricane again on September 23. However, wind shear returned later that day and ocean temperatures began cooling. Another trough re-curved Karl northward on September 24 as the storm was gradually weakening. Early on September 25, Karl became extratropical while located about 585 mi (941 km) east of Cape Race, Newfoundland. The remnants of Karl accelerated northeastward and then east-northeastward, later moving through the Faroe Islands. Sustained winds up to 89 mph (143 km/h) and gusts reaching 112 mph (180 km/h) were observed on Mykines. The extratropical remnants of Karl moved ashore western Norway on September 28, dissipating soon as it was absorbed into another extratropical low.

=== Hurricane Lisa ===
- Category 1 hurricane (SSHWS)
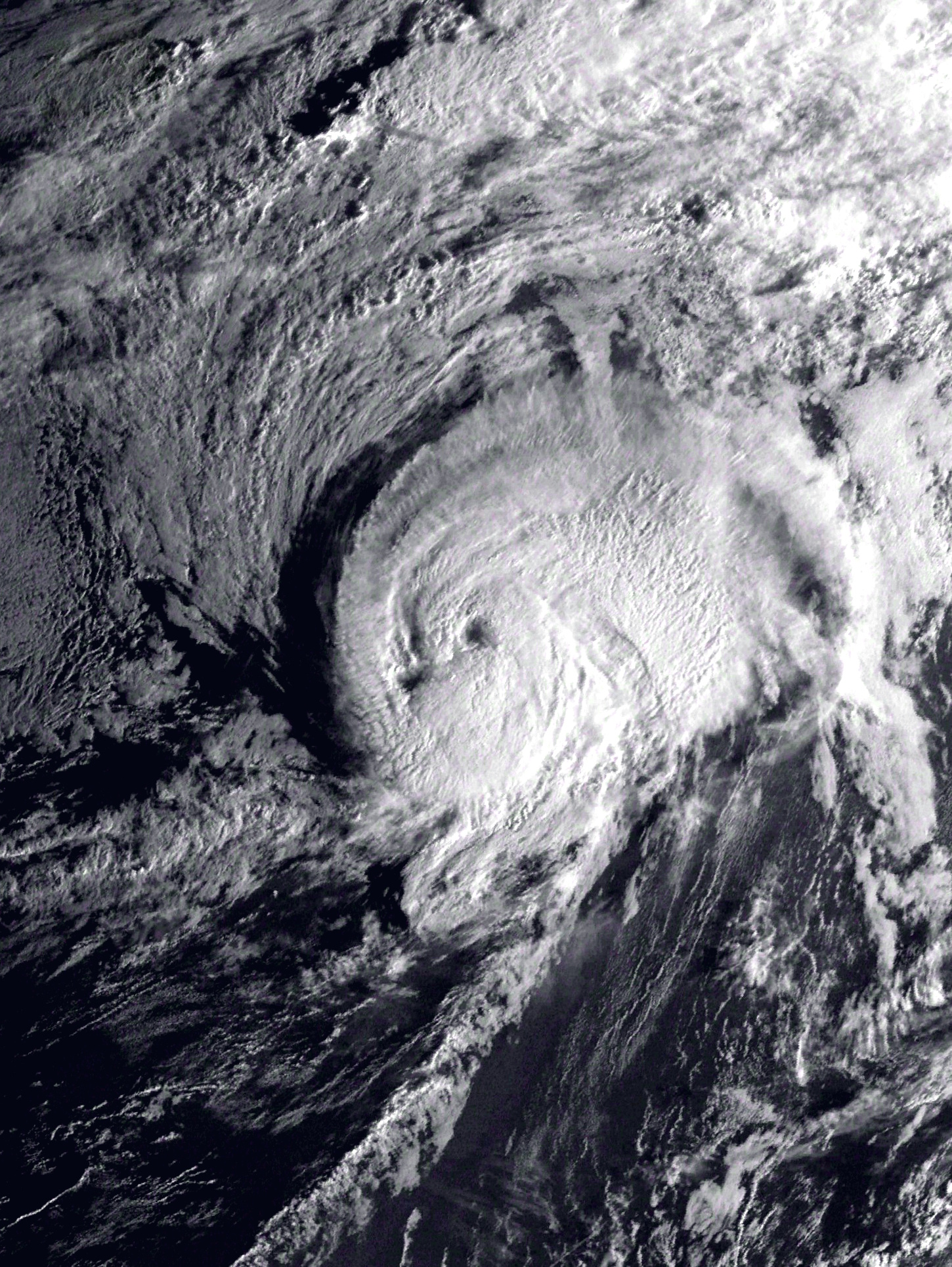
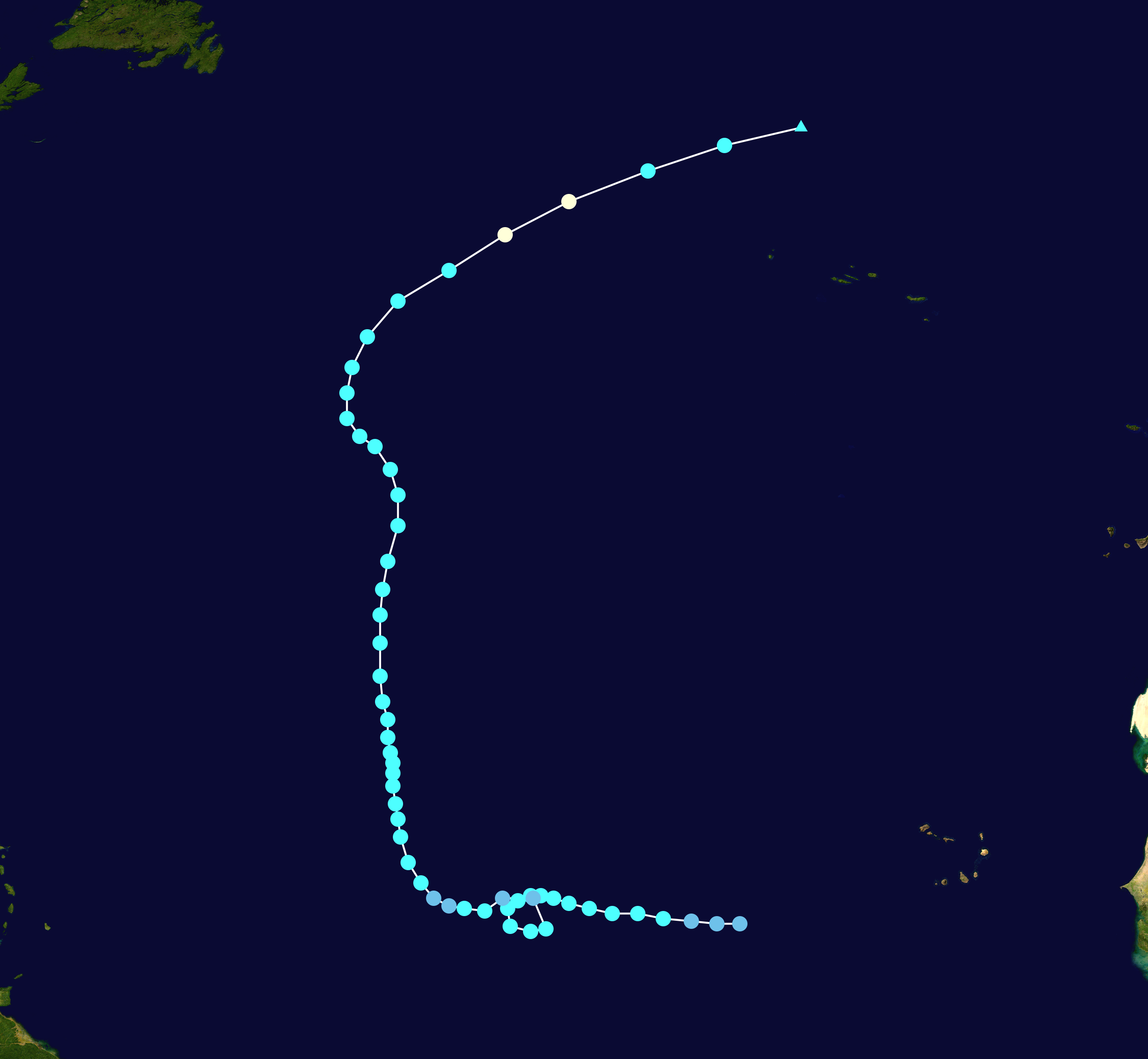
- Duration: September 19 – October 3
- Peak intensity: 75 mph (120 km/h) (1-min); 987 mbar (hPa)

At 18:00 UTC on September 19, a tropical wave developed into Tropical Depression Thirteen, which was centered located about 520 mi (840 km) west-southwest of Cape Verde. Despite unfavorable conditions due to outflow from nearby Hurricane Karl, the depression strengthened into Tropical Storm Lisa on September 20. After nearly reaching hurricane status, Lisa began executing a small cyclonic loop due to a Fujiwhara interaction with a tropical wave. Additionally, the interaction caused Lisa to weaken to a tropical depression on September 23. As Lisa merged with the tropical wave, convection became difficult to distinguish between the two systems, although Lisa maintained a distinct low-level circulation throughout the merger. During the next several days, the storm fluctuated in intensity, from a tropical depression to a strong tropical storm. A deep mid- to upper-level trough caused Lisa to turn northward on September 25.

By October 1, a short-wave trough re-curved and accelerated Lisa toward the northeast. The storm strengthened and was finally upgraded to a hurricane at 06:00 UTC on October 2. At that time, Lisa attained its peak intensity with winds of 75 mph (121 km/h) and a minimum barometric pressure of 987 mbar (29.1 inHg). After sea surface temperatures dropped to around 73.4 °F (23.0 °C), Lisa weakened and was downgraded to a tropical storm later on October 2. The storm lost tropical characteristics and transitioned into an extratropical cyclone at 12:00 UTC on October 3. Shortly thereafter, the remnants of Lisa were absorbed by a frontal zone while located about 1,150 mi (1,850 km) of Cape Race, Newfoundland.

=== Tropical Storm Matthew ===
- Tropical storm (SSHWS)
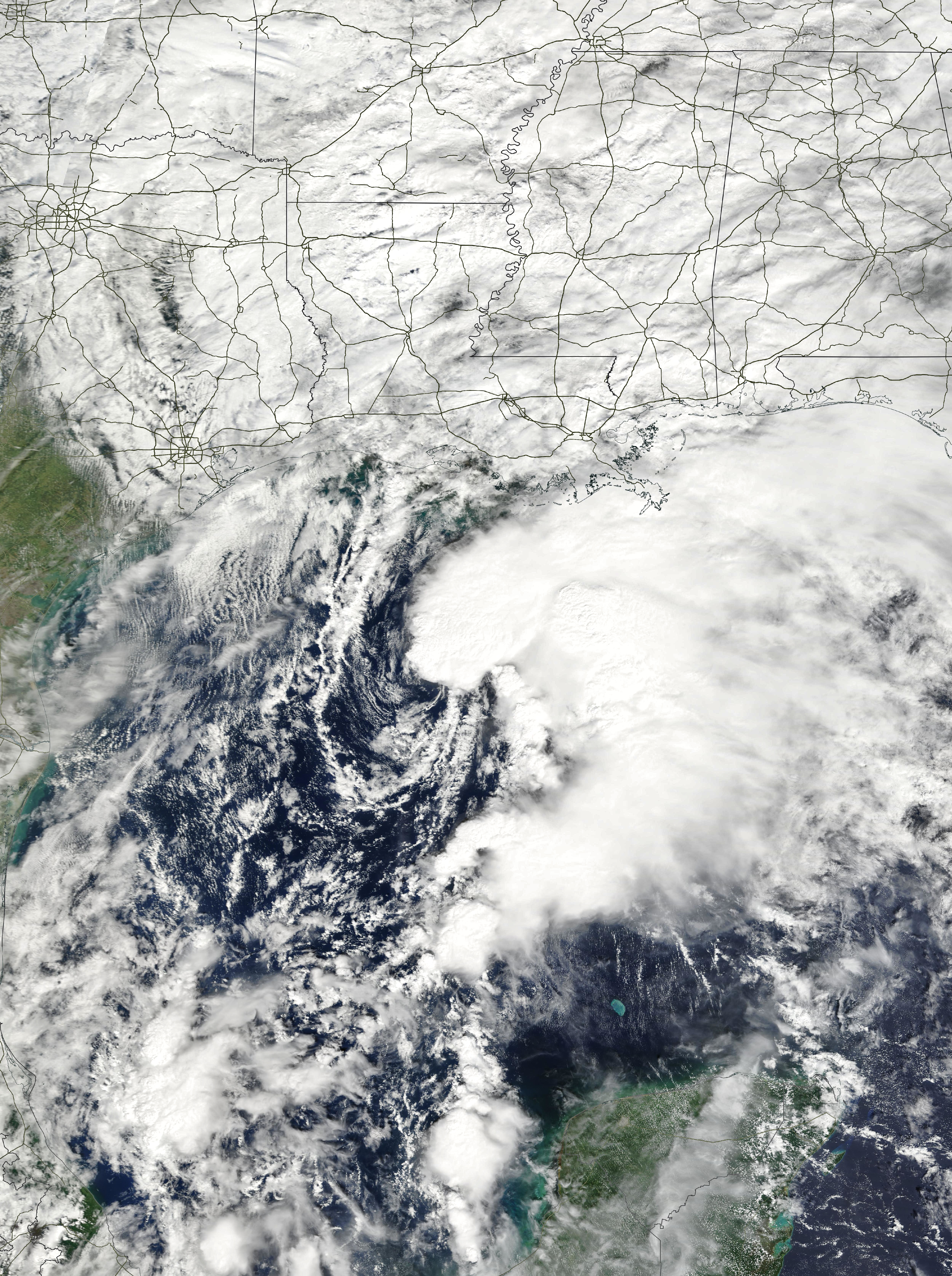
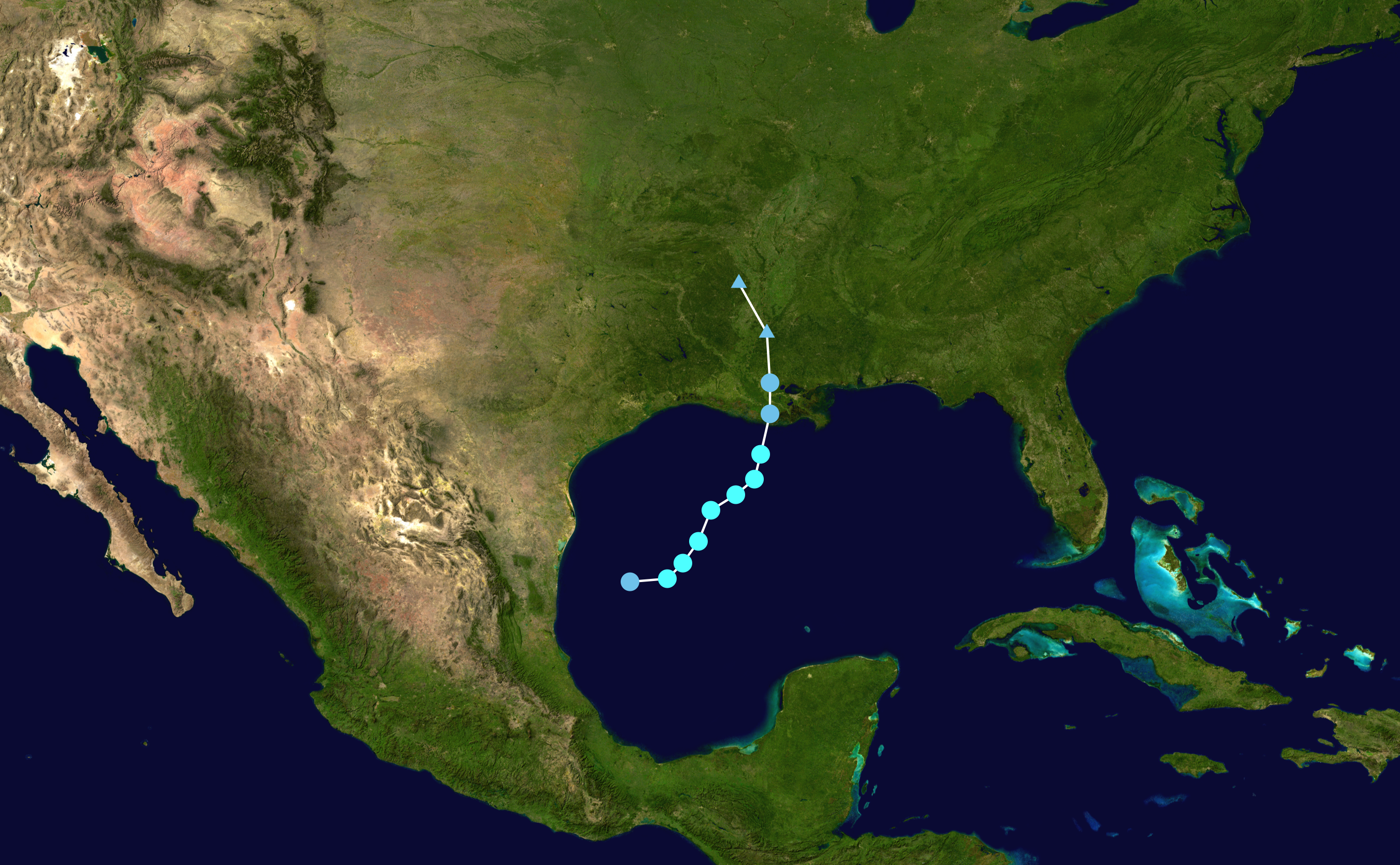
- Duration: October 8 – October 10
- Peak intensity: 45 mph (75 km/h) (1-min); 997 mbar (hPa)

A tropical wave moved off the coast of Africa on September 19. The wave moved westward and passed through the Lesser Antilles, slowly organizing with convection increasing due an upper-level low. On October 5, it entered the Gulf of Mexico, and developed an area of low pressure two days later. The system continued to organize, and on October 8, after developing a circulation, it developed into Tropical Depression Fourteen while located 205 miles (330 km) to the southeast of Brownsville, Texas. The depression moved to the east-northeast, and quickly strengthened into Tropical Storm Matthew. The storm turned to the northeast while moving around the periphery of a high pressure system over Texas, and attained a peak intensity of 45 mph (72 km/h) on October 9. Strong wind shear limited further strengthening, and on October 10, Matthew struck Cocodrie, Louisiana as a minimal tropical storm. On October 11, Matthew weakened to a tropical depression and subsequently became an extratropical cyclone. While moving inland, Matthew spun off another low pressure system that formed over North Carolina on October 13, which was absorbed by a frontal wave the next day.

Two emergency shelters were opened in Louisiana. Oyster harvesting sites were closed to avoid bacterial contamination from potential storm surge. Matthew produced heavy rainfall across its path, reaching as far east as Florida, and as far inland as northeastern Ohio. It also produced a storm surge that reached 5.85 feet (1.78 m) in Frenier, Louisiana, with above-normal tides as far east as Alabama. The tides and coastal flooding added to the beach erosion caused by earlier Hurricane Ivan. Damage reached $255,000 in Louisiana and $50,000 in Mississippi. In Louisiana, rainfall peaked at 18.00 inches (457 mm) in Haynesville. The rains led to freshwater flooding, with the Tickfaw River cresting at 5.7 ft (1.7 m) in Louisiana. In Terrebonne Parish, the floods damaged 20 homes damaged. In LaPlace, the floods cracked a water line, which left nearly 30,000 people without tap water, led to boil water advisories, and caused schools to close. The storm also left about 2,500 people without power. Several roads closed due to floods or were impacted by fallen trees. Wind gusts reached 55 mph (89 km/h) at the mouth of the Mississippi River. In Golden Meadow, Matthew spawned a tornado that damaged the roof of a trailer. Outside of Louisiana, rains reached 8.29 in (211 mm) in Arkansas.

=== Subtropical Storm Nicole ===
- Subtropical storm (SSHWS)
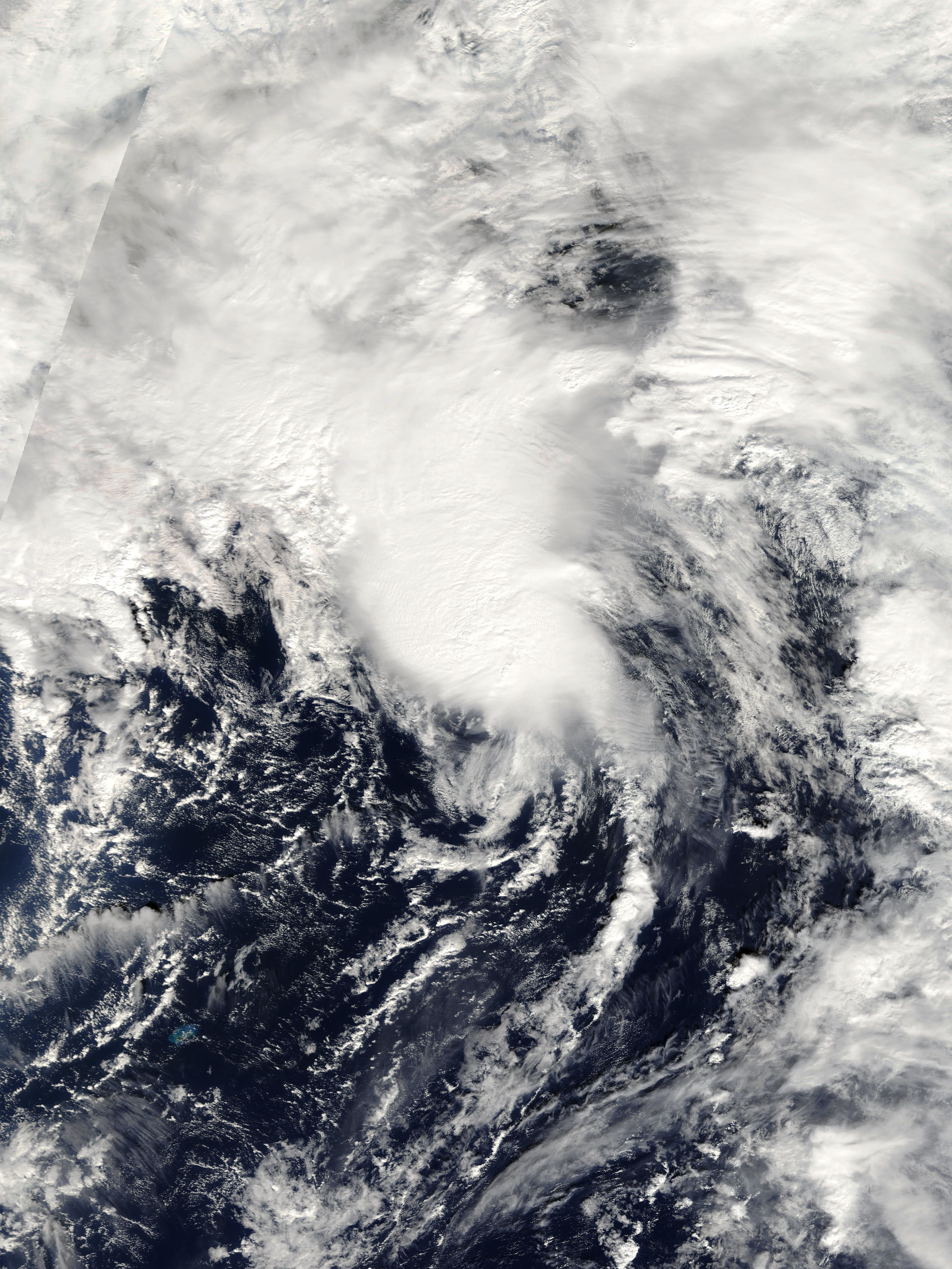
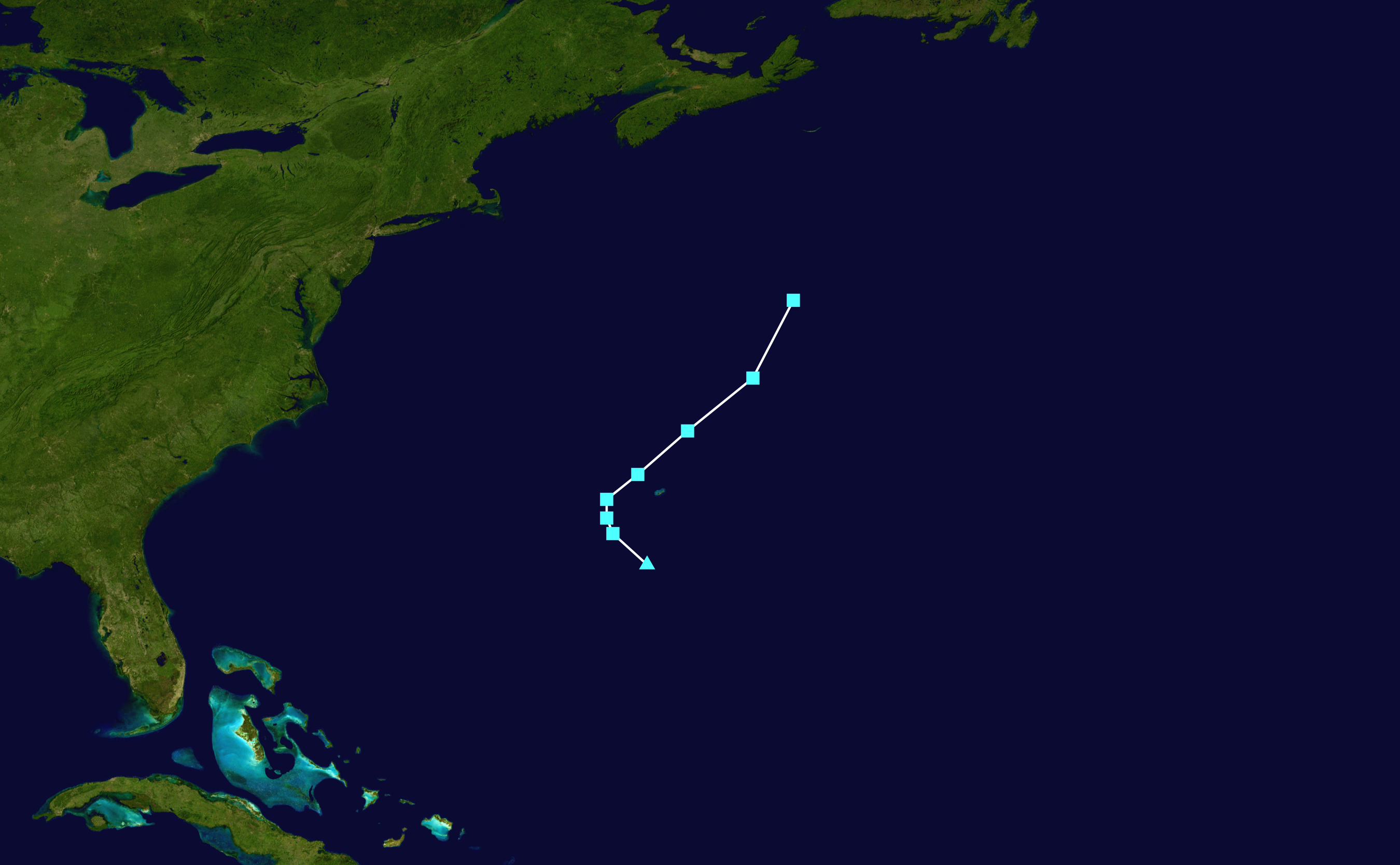
- Duration: October 10 – October 11
- Peak intensity: 50 mph (85 km/h) (1-min); 986 mbar (hPa)

An upper-level trough and a decaying cold front persisted across the western Atlantic Ocean in early October. The interaction between the two led to the formation of an area of low pressure on October 8 to the southwest of Bermuda. The system lacked a single well-defined circulation, though it possessed gale-force winds as it moved northwestward. The system gradually became better organized. Around 00:00 UTC on October 10, an extratropical cyclone formed with a well-defined low-level circulation. By six hours later, a curved rainband formed, signaling that the cyclone transitioned into Subtropical Storm Nicole about 140 miles (230 km) southwest of Bermuda. There was a broad wind field, with the strongest winds more than 115 miles (185 km) from the center. A mid-level trough turned the storm northeastward, and early on October 11, it passed about 60 miles (97 km) northwest of Bermuda. Shortly after passing Bermuda, Nicole developed persistent deep convection near the center, while Advanced Microwave Sounding Unit overpasses indicated the potential of a warm core within the system. It intensified to reach peak winds of 50 mph (80 km/h), but strong wind shear prevented Nicole from transitioning into a tropical cyclone. Late on October 11, Nicole was absorbed by a larger extratropical cyclone to its north.

The Bermuda Weather Service issued a gale warning, and later a tropical storm watch. Wind gusts on the island peaked at 60 mph (97 km/h) during Nicole's formative stage. Nicole and the precursor extratropical storm dropped heavy precipitation, amounting to 5.86 inches (149 mm) over a three-day period at the Bermuda International Airport. Poor weather conditions forced the cancellation of several events at the Bermuda Music Festival. Strong winds knocked down power lines, leaving over 1,800 homes and businesses without power. Unsettled conditions also resulted in airport delays. High winds delayed or altered the courses of four cruise ships, and a seasick passenger had to be taken to the hospital. Due to moisture from Nicole combined with the extratropical storm, the Atlantic Storm Prediction Centre issued heavy rainfall and wind warnings for large portions of the Canadian Maritimes. The remnants of Nicole combined with a powerful extratropical cyclone to produce strong winds across the Maritimes, reaching 80 mph (130 km/h) on western Cape Breton. The strong winds knocked down trees and power lines, while heavy rainfall over 2 inches (51 mm) caused flooding in eastern Nova Scotia. Travel by ferry and across the Confederation Bridge was restricted. Wind gusts reached 65 mph (105 km/h) across Maine. The winds downed trees and power lines, causing power outages in coastal portions of Washington and Hancock Counties.

=== Tropical Storm Otto ===
- Tropical storm (SSHWS)
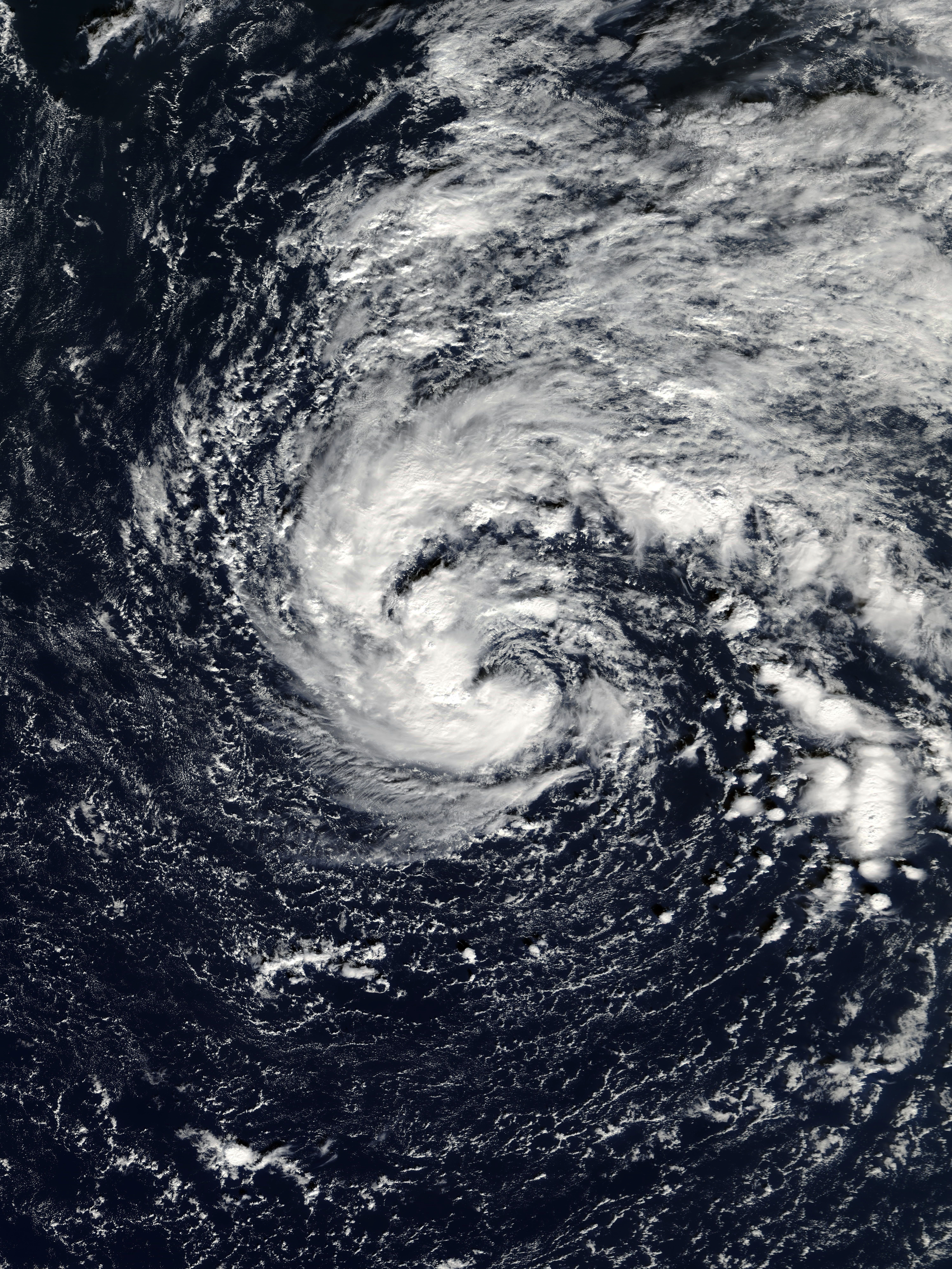
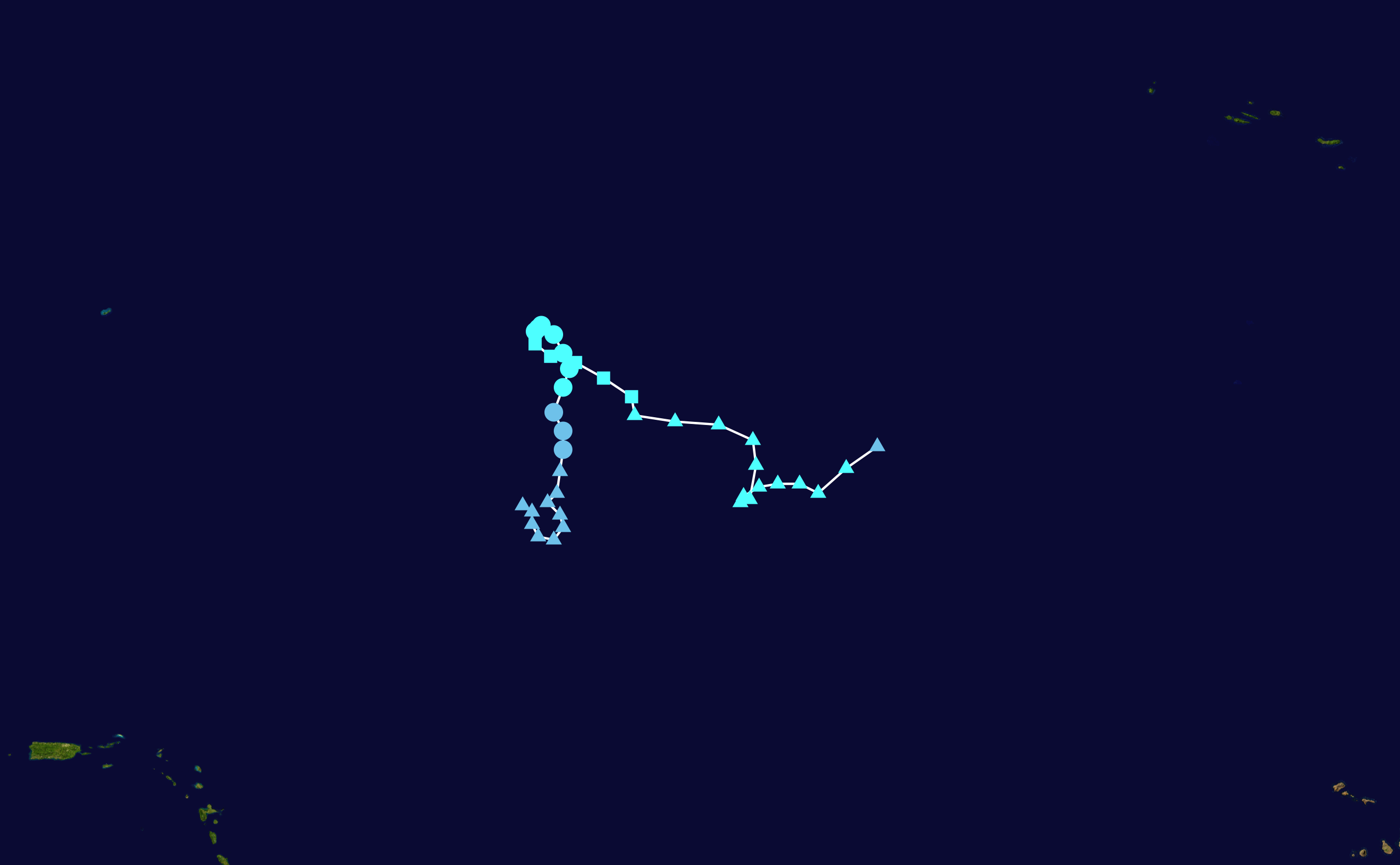
- Duration: November 29 – December 3
- Peak intensity: 50 mph (85 km/h) (1-min); 995 mbar (hPa)

A cold front and a strong upper-level trough interacted, resulting in the development of an extratropical low-pressure area on November 26. After losing frontal characteristics, the system transitioned into Subtropical Storm Otto at 12:00 UTC on November 29, while located about 1,150 mi (1,850 km) east-southeast of Bermuda. Initially, the storm moved northwestward due to a weakness in a subtropical ridge. Late on November 29, Otto attained its maximum sustained wind speed of 50 mph (80 km/h). Deep convection formed near the center and the storm began transitioning to a warm core system.

The system was re-classified as Tropical Storm Otto at 12:00 UTC on November 30, although it is possible that Otto transitioned to a fully tropical cyclone one day earlier, on November 29. Although sea temperatures were relatively cold, Otto did not quickly weaken, because of low wind shear. On December 1, the storm curved southeastward and completed a cyclonic loop later that day. After wind shear began increasing, Otto started weakening and was downgraded to a tropical depression at 12:00 UTC on December 2. At that time, Otto reached its minimum barometric pressure of 995 mbar (29.4 inHg). Early on December 3, the storm degenerated into a remnant low while located about 920 mi (1,480 km) southeast of Bermuda.

== Storm names ==
The following list of names was used for named storms that formed in the North Atlantic in 2004. This was the same list used for the 1998 season, except for Gaston and Matthew, which replaced Georges and Mitch respectively. Storms were named Gaston, Matthew, and Otto for the first time in 2004.

- Alex
- Bonnie
- Charley
- Danielle
- Earl
- Frances
- Gaston
- Hermine
- Ivan
- Jeanne
- Karl
- Lisa
- Matthew
- Nicole
- Otto
- Paula (unused)
- Richard (unused)
- Shary (unused)
- Tomas (unused)
- Virginie (unused)
- Walter (unused)

=== Retirement ===
In the spring of 2005, The World Meteorological Organization retired the names of four destructive and deadly storms from the Atlantic hurricanes name lists: Charley, Frances, Ivan, and Jeanne. They were replaced with Colin, Fiona, Igor, and Julia, for the 2010 season. As of 2026, the 2004 season is one of four seasons to have four names retired, along with 1955, 1995, and 2017. Only the 2005 season has had more – with five names retired.

== Season effects ==
This is a table of all of the storms that formed in the 2004 Atlantic hurricane season. It includes their name, duration, peak classification and intensities, areas affected, damage, and death totals. Deaths in parentheses are additional and indirect (an example of an indirect death would be a traffic accident), but were still related to that storm. Damage and deaths include totals while the storm was extratropical, a wave, or a low, and all of the damage figures are in 2004 USD.

Saffir–Simpson scale
TD	TS	C1	C2	C3	C4	C5

2004 North Atlantic tropical cyclone season statistics
Storm name	Dates active	Storm category at peak intensity	Max 1-min wind mph (km/h)	Min. press. (mbar)	Areas affected	Damage (US$)	Deaths	Ref(s).
Alex	July 31 – August 6	Category 3 hurricane	120 (195)	957	Southeastern United States, Atlantic Canada	$7.5 million	1	
Bonnie	August 3 – 14	Tropical storm	65 (100)	1001	Lesser Antilles, Greater Antilles, Yucatán Peninsula, Southeastern United States, Mid-Atlantic states, New England, Atlantic Canada	$1.27 million	3 (1)	
Charley	August 9 – 14	Category 4 hurricane	150 (240)	941	Lesser Antilles, Greater Antilles, East Coast of the United States	$16.9 billion	15 (20)	
Danielle	August 13 – 21	Category 2 hurricane	110 (175)	964	Cape Verde	None	None	
Earl	August 13 – 15	Tropical storm	50 (85)	1009	Windward Islands	Unknown	None	
Frances	August 24 – September 10	Category 4 hurricane	145 (230)	935	The Bahamas, Southern United States, Midwestern United States, Mid-Atlantic states, New England, Atlantic Canada	$9.67 billion	7 (43)	
Gaston	August 27 – September 1	Category 1 hurricane	75 (120)	985	The Carolinas, Mid-Atlantic states, New England, Atlantic Canada	$130 million	8 (1)	
Hermine	August 27 – 31	Tropical storm	60 (95)	1002	New England (Massachusetts), Atlantic Canada	Minimal	None	
Ivan	September 2 – 24	Category 5 hurricane	165 (270)	910	Lesser Antilles, Venezuela, Greater Antilles, Gulf Coast of the United States, Eastern United States, Atlantic Canada	$26.07 billion	92 (32)	
Ten	September 7 – 9	Tropical depression	35 (55)	1009	None	None	None	
Jeanne	September 13 – 28	Category 3 hurricane	120 (195)	950	Leeward Islands, Greater Antilles, Southeastern United States, Mid-Atlantic states, New England, Atlantic Canada	$7.63 billion	3,037	
Karl	September 16 – 24	Category 4 hurricane	145 (230)	938	Faroe Islands, Iceland, Norway	Minimal	None	
Lisa	September 19 – October 3	Category 1 hurricane	75 (120)	987	None	None	None	
Matthew	October 8 – 10	Tropical storm	45 (75)	997	Gulf Coast of the United States, Midwestern United States, Great Plains	$305,000	None	
Nicole	October 10 – 11	Subtropical storm	50 (85)	986	Bermuda, Maine, Atlantic Canada	None	None	
Otto	November 29 – December 3	Tropical storm	50 (85)	995	None	None	None	
Season aggregates
16 systems	July 31 – December 3		165 (270)	910		$60.41 billion	3,164 (97)	

== See also ==
- Tropical cyclones in 2004
- 2004 Pacific hurricane season
- 2004 Pacific typhoon season
- 2004 North Indian Ocean cyclone season
- South-West Indian Ocean cyclone seasons: 2003–04, 2004–05
- Australian region cyclone seasons: 2003–04, 2004–05
- South Pacific cyclone seasons: 2003–04, 2004–05
