= List of North Carolina hurricanes (2000–present) =

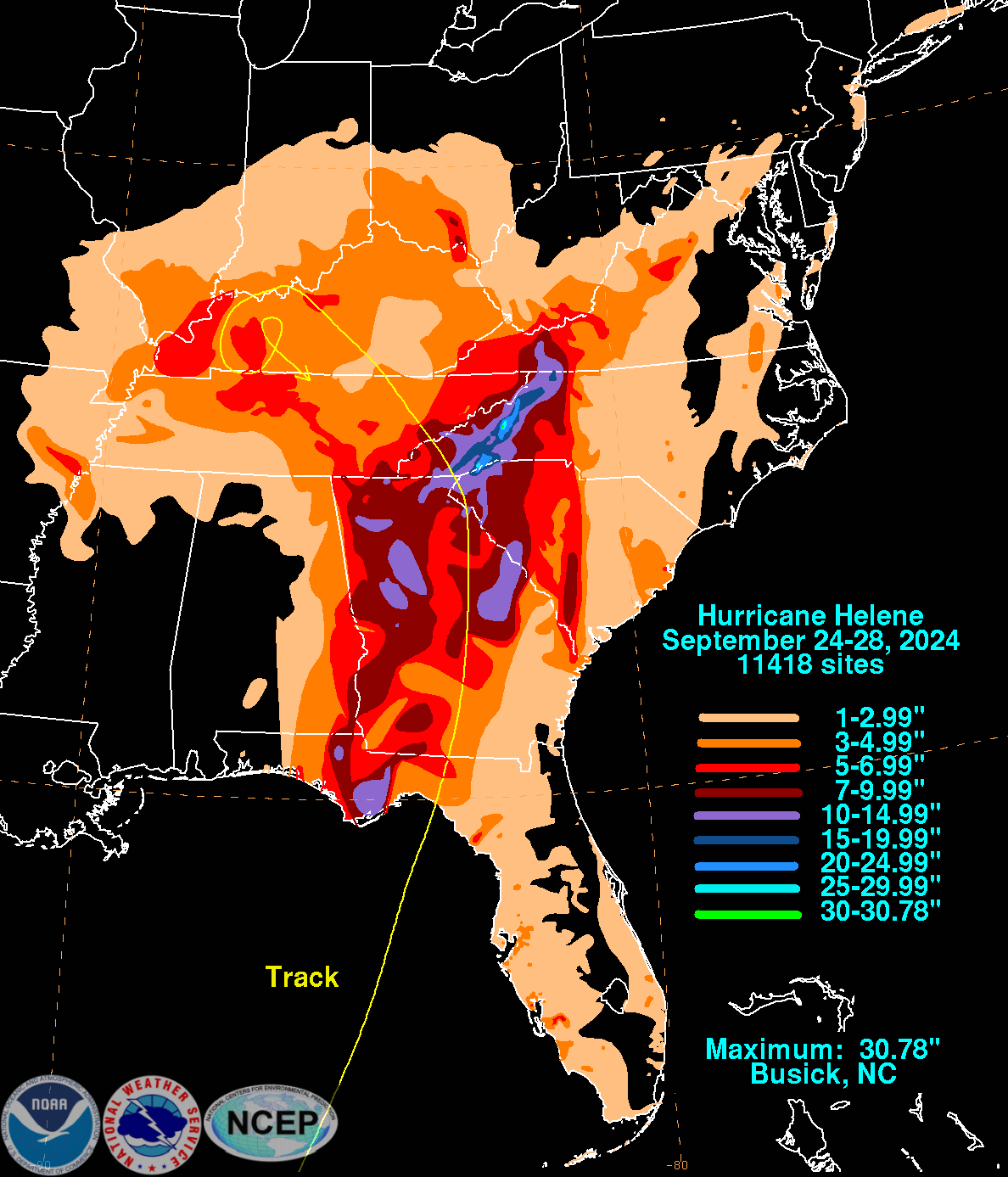
Rainfall map from Hurricane Helene

North Carolina is a U.S. state located on the Atlantic Seaboard in the Southeastern United States. Tropical cyclones—storms characterized by a large low-pressure center and numerous thunderstorms that produce strong winds and heavy rain—regularly affect the state. According to statistical hurricane research between 1886 and 1996 by the North Carolina State Climatology Office, a tropical cyclone makes landfall along the coastline about once every four years. An estimated 17.5% of all North Atlantic tropical cyclones have affected the state.

This list documents 79 tropical cyclones known to have affected the state between 2000 and the present. The most active month is September, with 31 total storms, while November is the least active month with three storms. The strongest hurricane to hit the state during the time period was Hurricane Isabel in 2003, producing maximum sustained winds equivalent to Category 2 status on the Saffir–Simpson hurricane scale. In terms of impacts, Hurricane Helene in 2024 was the most destructive and the deadliest. The first storm to impact the state during the period was Hurricane Florence in September 2000, and the most recent was Hurricane Erin in August 2025.

== 2000–2004 ==
- September 12, 2000 – Rip currents from Hurricane Florence kill three people due to drowning.
- September 19, 2000 – The extratropical remnants of Hurricane Gordon track through the state, dropping light to moderate rainfall.
- September 23, 2000 – Tropical Depression Helene re-intensifies into a tropical storm over the northeastern portion of the state, producing moderate rainfall across much of the state which peaks at 8.31 inches (211 mm) in Longwood.
- June 13, 2001 – The remnants of Tropical Storm Allison enter the state as a subtropical depression and drop over 10 inches (250 mm) of rainfall in the northeastern portion of the state; the rainfall results in nine indirect deaths due to traffic accidents on slick roads.
- August 8, 2001 – The remnants of Tropical Storm Barry drop light rainfall in the state's mountainous region.
- July 14, 2002 – Tropical Storm Arthur forms just offshore and drops light rainfall near the coast.
- September 10, 2002 – Tropical Storm Gustav strikes the Outer Banks with a 6-foot (1.8 m) storm surge, ocean swells up to 15 ft (4.6 m) ocean swells, and wind gusts up to 78 mph (126 km/h), causing about $100,000 in damage.
- September 15, 2002 – The remnants of Tropical Storm Hanna drop moderate rainfall across much of the state, causing some flooding in Wilmington.
- September 27, 2002 – The large wind field of what was once Hurricane Isidore downs trees and power lines across the western portion of the state, which blocks numerous roads.
- October 11, 2002 – Tropical Storm Kyle makes landfall near Long Beach, spawning an F2 tornado in Pantego and a few weaker tornadoes. The passage of the storm results in about a dozen damaged or destroyed houses, but no deaths or injuries in the state.
- July 2, 2003 – Tropical Depression Bill crosses the extreme western portion of the state. The storm drops locally heavy rainfall peaking at 9.7 inches (246 mm) in Transylvania County, with one fatality reported due to drowning.
- July 26, 2003 – Tropical Depression Seven hits Georgia, dropping light rainfall in southern North Carolina.
- September 2003 – The remnants of Tropical Storm Grace produce light rainfall across much of the state.
- September 4, 2003 – Rip currents from Hurricane Fabian cause one drowning death near Cape Hatteras.
- September 12, 2003 – The remnants of Tropical Storm Henri move across the eastern portion of the state, dropping light rainfall.
- September 18, 2003 – Hurricane Isabel makes landfall at Drum Inlet with winds of 105 mph (170 km/h) and causes three deaths in the state, one of which directly. Damage in the state totals $450 million, most of which in Dare County where some homes are washed away. The storm surge produces a 2,000-foot (600 m) wide inlet on Hatteras Island, isolating Hatteras by road for two months.
- August 3, 2004 – Hurricane Alex brushes the Outer Banks, producing strong waves and moderate storm surge flooding; one person is killed from the surf, and hundreds of vehicles and homes are flooded.
- August 13, 2004 – The remnants of Tropical Storm Bonnie spawn an F2 tornado near Rocky Point, killing three people; the tornado also destroys 17 houses and severely damages 27 buildings.
- August 14, 2004 – Hurricane Charley moves ashore just southwest of the North Carolina – South Carolina border, resulting in moderate winds and about $25 million in damage as it tracks across the eastern portion of the state.
- August 30, 2004 – Tropical Depression Gaston traverses the state, bringing moderate precipitation which causes some flooding.
- September 8, 2004 – Former Hurricane Frances crosses the western portion of the state, dropping very heavy rainfall peaking at 23.6 inches (599 mm) on Mount Mitchell. The rainfall causes widespread flooding, with many creeks and rivers surpassing flood stage; hundreds of homes and businesses are damaged or destroyed.
- September 17, 2004 – Former Hurricane Ivan tracks along the border between North Carolina and Tennessee, dropping heavy rainfall that peaks at 17.0 inches (432 mm) in Cruso, as well as producing 4 tornadoes in the state. The hurricane kills eight people in the state, and causes severe flooding just nine days after the previous cyclone tracked through the area; the flooding damages or destroy hundreds of buildings, and washes away several bridges.
- September 25, 2004 – Heavy surf from Hurricane Jeanne kills a man to the east of Oak Island after he is thrown overboard from his boat. Three days later the storm's remnants cross the western portion of the state, causing the third flood in a month; the flood from Jeanne is less severe and shorter in duration than that from Ivan and Frances.

== 2005–2009 ==
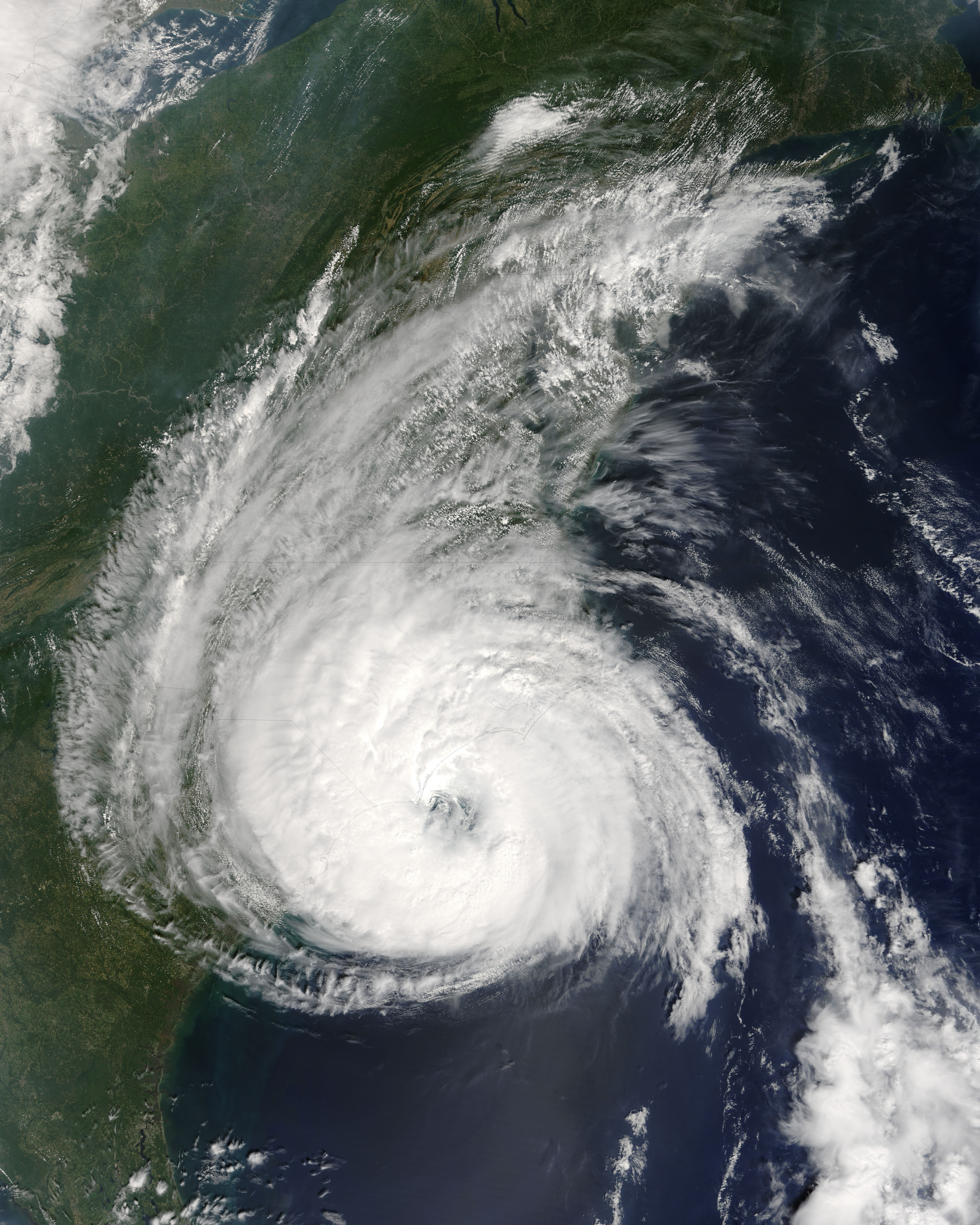
Hurricane Ophelia just off North Carolina

- June 12, 2005 – Tropical Depression Arlene passes west of the state, producing locally heavy rainfall peaking at 9.84 inches (250 mm) in Transylvania County.
- July 7, 2005 – The remnants of Hurricane Cindy spawn eight tornadoes in the state, including one near Harmony that damages or destroys over a dozen structures.
- July 11, 2005 – Tropical Depression Dennis passes through Tennessee, with its large circulation dropping moderate to heavy precipitation in western North Carolina.
- August 30, 2005 – The remnants of Hurricane Katrina produce moderate rainfall and gusty winds in the western portion of the state.
- September 14 – September 16, 2005 – Hurricane Ophelia drifts just offshore of the Outer Banks, dropping heavy rainfall peaking at 17.5 inches (445 mm) and causing $70 million in damage.
- October 7, 2005 – Tropical Storm Tammy drops light rainfall in the southern portion of the state, and later combines with another disturbance to cause widespread flooding.
- October 23, 2005 – The outer rainbands of Hurricane Wilma drop over 3 inches (75 mm) of precipitation in the Outer Banks.
- June 14, 2006 – The remnants of Tropical Storm Alberto cross the state, producing heavy rainfall peaking at 7.16 inches (182 mm) in Raleigh; the rain causes one indirect death when a boy runs into a flooded drainage system and drowns.
- September 1, 2006 – Tropical Storm Ernesto makes landfall on Oak Island and floods dozens of houses due to heavy rainfall; damage is estimated at over $80 million, primarily from crop damage.
- May 7, 2007 – The precursor to Subtropical Storm Andrea produces rough waves along the state's coastline, causing moderate damage along the Outer Banks and killing four people in a boat offshore.
- June 3, 2007 – The extratropical remnants of Tropical Storm Barry crosses the eastern portion of the state and drops light rainfall.
- August 22, 2007 – Light rainfall occurs in association with the remnants of Tropical Storm Erin passing through the area.
- September 9, 2007 – Tropical Storm Gabrielle moves ashore on the Cape Lookout National Seashore, producing locally heavy rainfall but causing little damage.
- September 15, 2007 – The remnants of Hurricane Humberto drop light rainfall across much of the state before dissipating over the Appalachian Mountains.
- November 3, 2007 – Moderate winds from the extratropical remnants of Hurricane Noel leave about 6,000 people without power in the state.
- July 12, 2008 – Offshore Hurricane Bertha contributes to rip currents along the coast, leading to dozens of lifeguard rescues.
- July 20, 2008 – Tropical Storm Cristobal passes just offshore, dropping light rainfall and causing minor flooding.
- September 5, 2008 – Hurricane Hanna moves ashore near the South Carolina – North Carolina border, packing strong winds and torrential rains. Aside from minor structural damage, the storm's effects were generally minor.
- May 27, 2009 – The precursor to Tropical Depression One passes just to the east of the state's coastline, triggering shower activity and increased wind.
- August 22, 2009 – Category 4 Hurricane Bill churns the Atlantic and generates long periods of rough surf and rip currents throughout the region. In North Carolina, numerous rescues are performed.
- August 28, 2009 – Rip currents from Tropical Storm Danny result in the death of a 12-year-old boy.
- November 12, 2009 – The remnants of Hurricane Ida contribute to the formation of a strong and damaging extratropical cyclone along the U.S. East Coast. Heavy rainfall, up to 14.03 in (356 mm) in Manteo, occurs in portions of the state.

== 2010–2019 ==
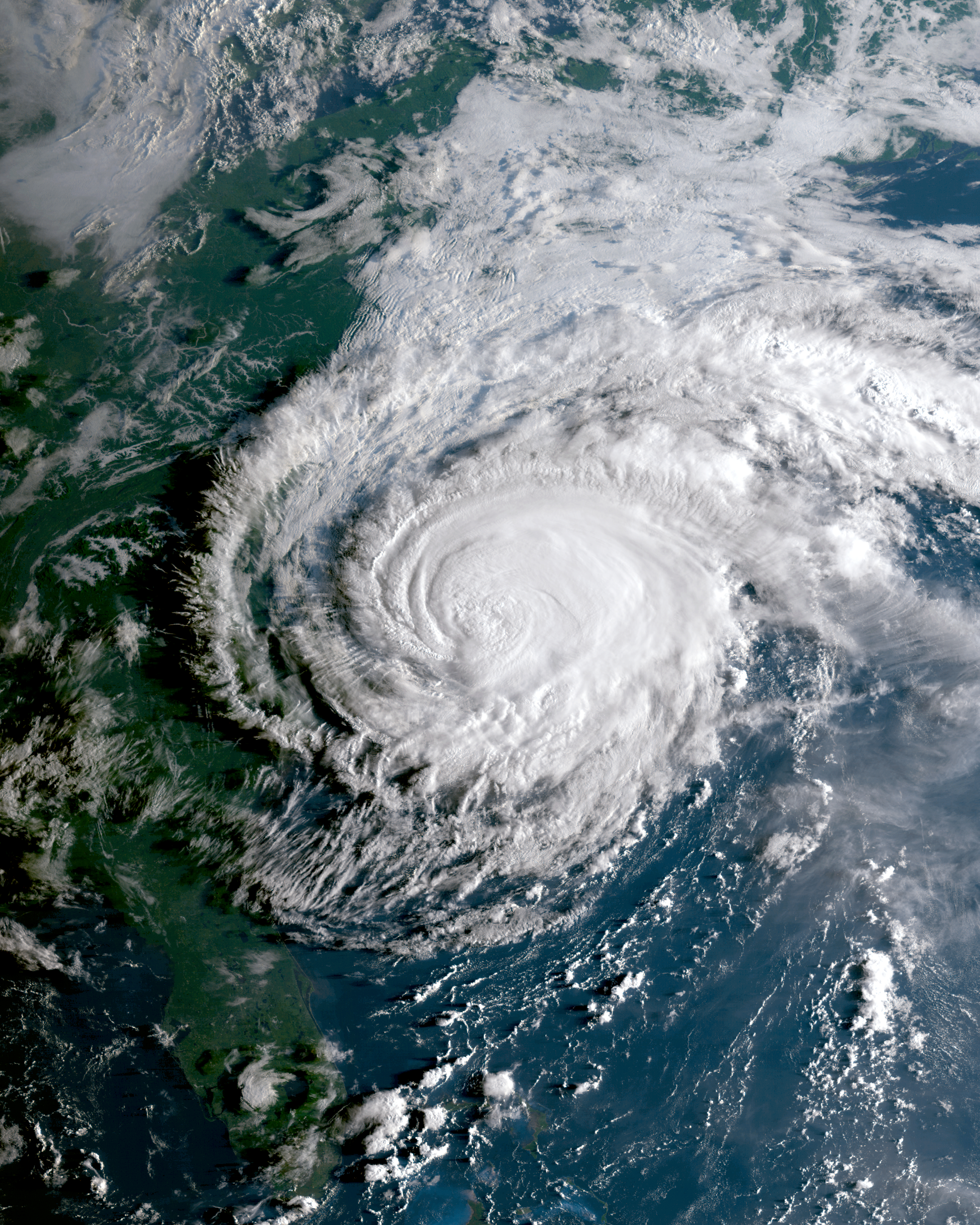
Hurricane Florence shortly after making landfall in North Carolina on September 14

- August 7, 2010 – Rip currents from Tropical Storm Colin kill a 51-year-old man off the coast of Ocracoke.
- September 3, 2010 – Hurricane Earl passes just east of the Outer Banks, inundating portions of North Carolina Highway 12 with storm surge and producing hurricane-force wind gusts that severely damaged six houses. Moderate crop damage was reported further inland, and monetary damage in the state reached $2.5 million (2010 USD).
- September 19, 2010 – A surfer dies in strong waves from Hurricane Igor in Surf City.
- August 27, 2011 – Hurricane Irene makes landfall in Cape Lookout as a Category 1 hurricane, causing seven total casualties as well as severe wind and flood damage.
- October 26–30, 2012 – Hurricane Sandy passed by the state, dropping heavy rains and making storm surge.
- July 3–4, 2014 – Hurricane Arthur hits eastern North Carolina, in particular the Outer Banks, with 100 mph (160 km/h).
- May 7, 2015 – Tropical Storm Ana produced heavy rainfall and indirectly caused a fatality.
- July 13, 2015 – The precursor to Tropical Storm Claudette produced moderate rainfall across the state.
- May 30, 2016 – The remnants of Tropical Storm Bonnie produce moderate rainfall across the central and eastern part of the state.
- September 2, 2016 – Tropical Storm Hermine produces sustained tropical storm-force winds across the state. Over 200,000 households lose power, with damages in Dare County totaling US$5.4 million.
- September 15, 2016 – Tropical Storm Julia passes to the south of the state and erratically drifts offshore. Parts of the state receive up to a foot of rain. A state of emergency is declared in 11 counties.
- October 8, 2016 – Hurricane Matthew hugged the NC coast after making landfall in South Carolina, causing torrential rains, with as much as 15.65 in (398 mm) recorded at William O. Huske Locke 3. Wilmington set a new storm tide (water level measured relative to high tide) record at 3.53 ft (1.08 m), beating the previous one of 3.47 ft (1.06 m) set during Hurricane Hazel on October 15, 1954. Matthew caused total devastation in Robeson County especially Lumberton. At least 28 people were killed, making Matthew the deadliest hurricane in North Carolina since Floyd killed 35 in 1999.
- September 19, 2017 – Rough surf and swells from Hurricane Jose flooded portions of the Outer Banks.
- September 26—27, 2017 – Hurricane Maria brushes eastern North Carolina, producing some coastal floods, light rain and gusty winds. Damage is limited to the coastline; there is some beach erosion.
- Early July 2018 – Tropical Storm Chris meanders to the southeast of the state, causing rough seas and rip currents, which were blamed for one fatality in Kill Devil Hills.
- September 14, 2018 – Hurricane Florence made landfall less than a mile south of Wrightsville Beach, North Carolina with winds of 90 mph (145 km/h). The hurricane was first declared a threat to the state. Several people were rescued offshore due to rip currents affecting the area.
- October 11, 2018 – Tropical Storm Michael moves through the state, leaving 428,000 homes without power and killed 3 people after trees struck their cars.
- September 5, 2019 – Hurricane Dorian brushes by the state and makes landfall in Cape Hatteras.
- September 19, 2019 – Rip currents from Hurricane Humberto kill a man at Topsail Beach.

== 2020–present ==
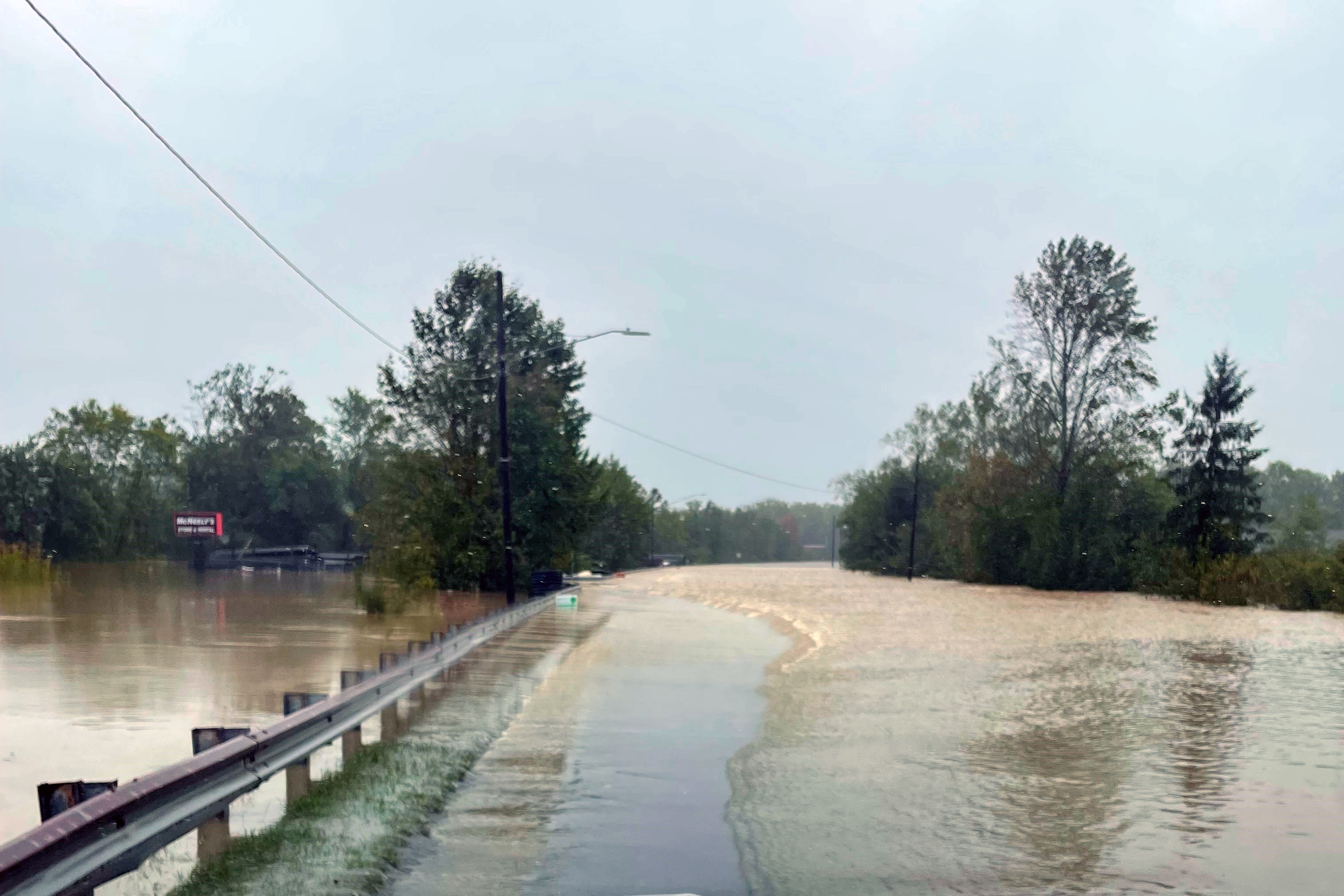
Flooding in Henderson County after Hurricane Helene

- May 18, 2020 – The center of Tropical Storm Arthur passes roughly 20 miles away from Cape Hatteras.
- July 9, 2020 – Tropical Storm Fay forms 40 miles east northeast of Cape Hatteras. Some waterspouts were reported offshore Hatteras, including one that moved ashore and lofted an umbrella as an EF0 tornado.
- August 3–4, 2020 – Hurricane Isaias makes landfall on the coast of North Carolina. Four people are killed in the state, with a large and destructive EF3 tornado causing half the fatalities.
- October 29—30, 2020 - Hurricane Zeta damaged hundreds of homes, uprooted trees, and caused flash flooding in certain areas in the state. Tropical storm force winds are documented in Cashiers.
- November 13, 2020 - Hurricane Eta interacted with a cold front as an extratropical storm and dropped heavy rainfall in the state. The heavy rains caused flash flooding, which is to blame for 9 deaths.
- July 8, 2021 – Hurricane Elsa impacted the central and eastern part of the state. It dropped 5 inches of rain in Raleigh, and spawns multiple tornadoes in eastern North Carolina.
- August 16—17, 2021 – Tropical Storm Fred dumps up to 12 inches of rain in the mountain region in the state. 6 deaths were caused by the Cruso flood. Buncombe and Haywood counties were hotspots for flash flooding. Tornadoes spawned in the central part of the state.
- August 21, 2021 – Rip currents from Hurricane Henri kill 2 people.
- July 3, 2022 – Tropical Storm Colin generates high surf along the coast, and 1 man drowns at a beach in Oak Island.
- September 22—23, 2022 – Hurricane Fiona generates rip currents along the NC coast, there were no fatalities.
- September 30, 2022 – Hurricane Ian crosses into NC as an extratropical cyclone with heavy rain and flooding, causing 4 people to die, 3 from car crashes and one from carbon monoxide poisoning.
- August 30—31, 2023 – Hurricane Idalia brings heavy rain to NC, after making landfall as a category 3 in Florida. Some areas experienced 4-5 feet of storm surge.
- September 23, 2023 – Tropical Storm Ophelia makes landfall near Emerald Isle as a high-end tropical storm with winds of 70 mph (115 km/h), producing heavy rainfall and strong winds across much of the region.
- August 6—8, 2024 - Hurricane Debby crosses into North Carolina as a weak tropical storm and dumps heavy rain and spawns tornadoes. A low-end EF3 tornado kills a person near Lucama. Another person is killed in Greensboro when a tree falls inside a home.
- September 27, 2024 – Hurricane Helene crosses into far western North Carolina as a tropical storm, producing heavy rain and high winds. The storm exacerbated flooding that was ongoing as a result of a stalled frontal system, causing catastrophic damage across the region. In total, at least 105 people were killed across the state.
- July 6, 2025 - Tropical Storm Chantal brought a deluge of rain and flooding to the area on July 6, according to officials. The Raleigh-Durham area saw nearly 12 inches of rainfall in 24 hours, while neighboring areas reported at least nine inches, according National Weather Service.
- August 20, 2025 – Hurricane Erin passes near the Crystal Coast at Category 2, bringing tropical storm conditions and rip currents to much of the Outer Banks.
- September 30, 2025 – Swells from hurricanes Imelda and Humberto flood a portion of North Carolina Highway 12 and cause eight homes on the Outer Banks to collapse.
- October 10 —11, 2026 - The remnants of Hurricane Isaias hit North Carolina with torrential rain, flooding, and tornadoes, underscoring that tropical systems can still pose major threats.

== Monthly statistics ==
Number of recorded storms affecting North Carolina
| Month | Number of storms |
|---|---|
| May | 5 |
| June | 4 |
| July | 14 |
| August | 17 |
| September | 33 |
| October | 8 |
| November | 3 |

== Deadly storms ==
Total deaths
| Name | Year | Number of deaths |
|---|---|---|
| Helene | 2024 | 107 |
| Florence | 2018 | 43 |
| Matthew | 2016 | 28 |
| Eta | 2020 | 11 |
| Allison | 2001 | 9 |
| Ivan | 2004 | 8 |
| Irene | 2011 | 7 |
| Fred | 2021 | 6 |
| Ian | 2022 | 5 |
| Andrea | 2007 | 4 |
| Isaias | 2020 | 4 |
| Florence | 2000 | 3 |
| Bonnie | 2004 | 3 |
| Michael | 2018 | 3 |
| Dorian | 2019 | 2 |
| Henri | 2021 | 2 |
| Debby | 2024 | 2 |
| Bill | 2003 | 1 |
| Fabian | 2003 | 1 |
| Jeanne | 2004 | 1 |
| Alberto | 2006 | 1 |
| Danny | 2009 | 1 |
| Colin | 2010 | 1 |
| Igor | 2010 | 1 |
| Humberto | 2019 | 1 |
| Colin | 2022 | 1 |

== See also ==
- List of North Carolina hurricanes
- Geography of North Carolina
