= Hurricane Alex (2004) =

Category 3 Atlantic hurricane in 2004

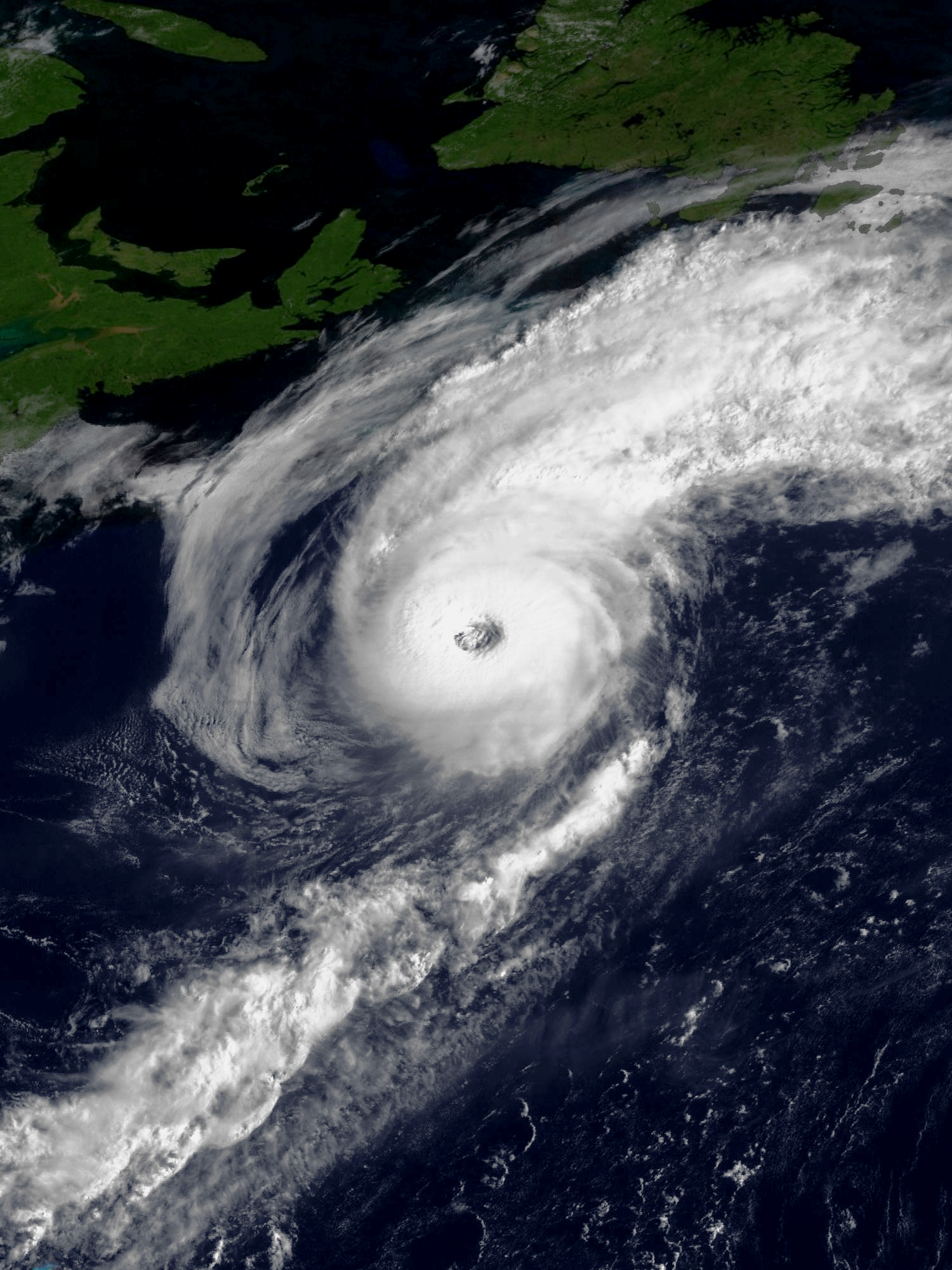
- Alex at peak intensity south of Nova Scotia early on August 5

Meteorological history
- Formed: July 31, 2004
- Dissipated: August 6, 2004

Category 3 major hurricane
- 1-minute sustained (SSHWS/NWS)
- Highest winds: 120 mph (195 km/h)
- Lowest pressure: 957 mbar (hPa); 28.26 inHg

Overall effects
- Fatalities: 1 direct
- Damage: $7.5 million (2004 USD)
- Areas affected: Outer Banks, Sable Island, Nova Scotia
- IBTrACS
- Part of the 2004 Atlantic hurricane season

Hurricane Alex was a considerably powerful tropical cyclone that marked the fifth-latest start to an Atlantic hurricane season since 1952. The first named storm, hurricane, and major hurricane of the 2004 Atlantic hurricane season, Alex gained major hurricane status at the most northerly latitude of any other Atlantic hurricane on record. Alex developed from the interaction between an upper-level low and a weak surface trough on July 31 to the east of Jacksonville, Florida. It moved northeastward, and strengthened to attain winds of 100 mph (160 km/h) before passing within 10 miles (16 km) of the Outer Banks coast. Alex strengthened further and reached a peak of 120 mph (190 km/h) winds while off the coast of New England, one of only six hurricanes to reach Category 3 status north of 38° N. Alex caused a scare of a hurricane-force direct hit in the Outer Banks of North Carolina, which had been devastated by Hurricane Isabel less than a year earlier.

The hurricane produced light damage in the Outer Banks, primarily from flooding and high winds. Over 100 houses were damaged, while numerous cars were disabled from the flooding. Damage totaled about $7.5 million (2004 USD). Alex produced strong waves and rip tides along the East Coast of the United States, causing one death and several injuries.

== Meteorological history ==
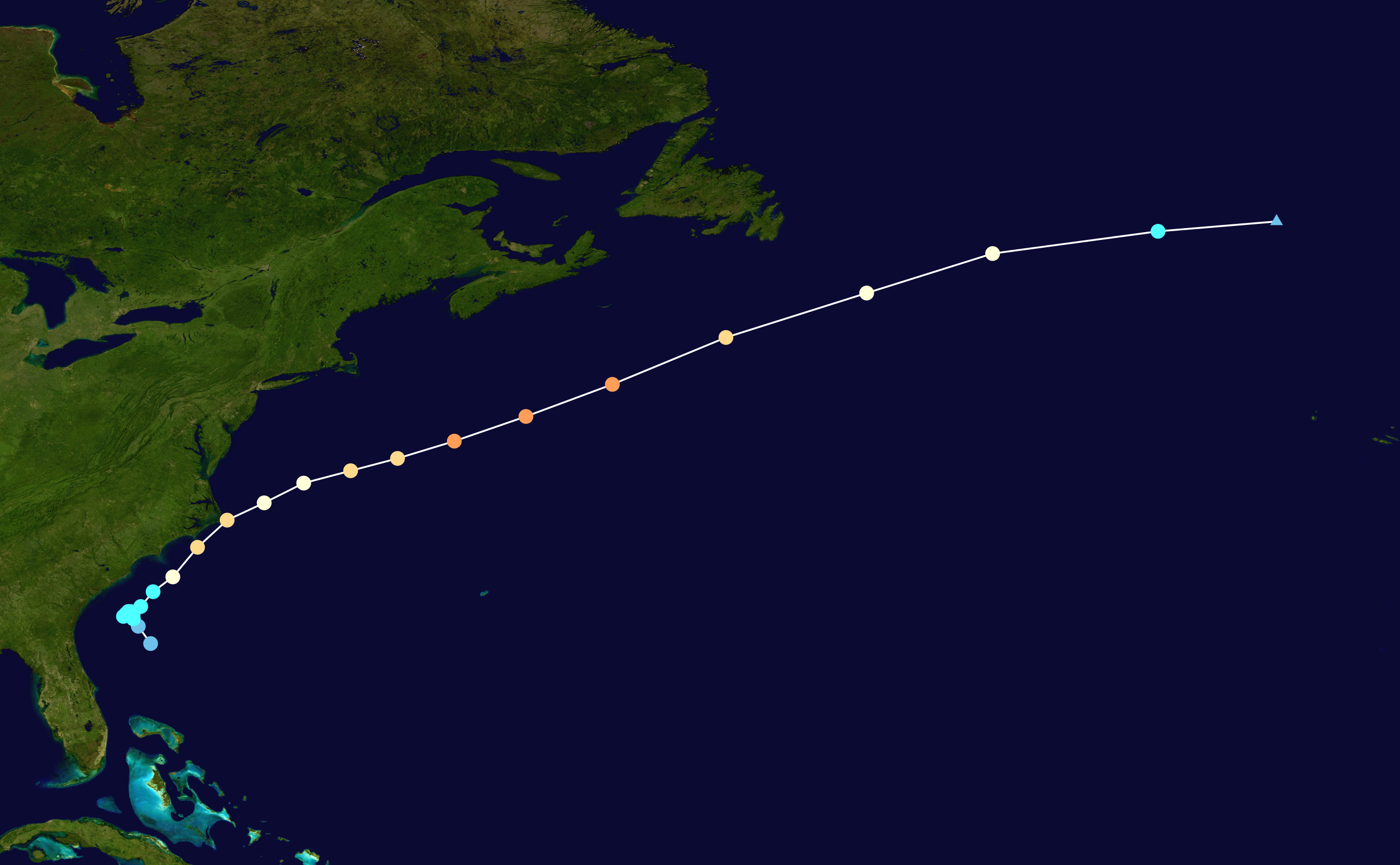
Map plotting the storm's track and intensity, according to the Saffir–Simpson scale Map key Saffir–Simpson scale Tropical depression (≤38 mph, ≤62 km/h) Tropical storm (39–73 mph, 63–118 km/h) Category 1 (74–95 mph, 119–153 km/h) Category 2 (96–110 mph, 154–177 km/h) Category 3 (111–129 mph, 178–208 km/h) Category 4 (130–156 mph, 209–251 km/h) Category 5 (≥157 mph, ≥252 km/h) Unknown Storm type Tropical cyclone Subtropical cyclone Extratropical cyclone, remnant low, tropical disturbance, or monsoon depression

A weak surface trough, located to the west of an upper-level low, developed convection to the east of the Bahamas on July 26. A tropical wave entered the area two days later, resulting in an increase of convective organization and area. Although conditions were not favorable for tropical cyclone formation, it sped to the northwest and steadily organized, developing a surface area of low pressure on the 30th. On July 31, the system continued to organize, and developed into Tropical Depression One while located 200 miles (320 km) to the east of Jacksonville, Florida.

As the depression drifted erratically, the system remained weak due to its large circulation and lack of deep convection near the center. The center relocated to the south, closer to the center. An approaching upper-level trough lessened the shear over the system, allowing the depression to intensify into Tropical Storm Alex on August 1. The trough also caused Alex to increase its forward motion to the northeast. Deep convection continued to build over the center due to low shear and warm waters from the Gulf Stream, and Alex intensified into a hurricane on August 3 while located 75 miles (121 km) southeast of Cape Fear, North Carolina. The cyclone continued to strengthen, and attained Category 2 status just hours after becoming a hurricane. The hurricane approached the Outer Banks of North Carolina, coming within 11 miles (18 km) of Cape Hatteras later on the 3rd. The western portion of the eyewall passed over the Outer Banks, though the center remained offshore.

Alex turned to the east-northeast after passing the Outer Banks in response to becoming embedded within the west-southwesterly flow. The hurricane briefly weakened to a Category 1, but restrengthened due to warm waters of the Gulf Stream. Water temperatures remained 3.6 °F (2.0 °C) above normal, resulting in Alex intensifying into a 120 mph (190 km/h) major hurricane on August 5 while located 450 miles (720 km) south of Halifax, Nova Scotia. Due to low vertical shear and favorable conditions, Alex remained a Category 3 hurricane until passing over cooler waters late on the 5th while 290 miles (470 km) south of Newfoundland. Alex rapidly weakened, degrading into tropical storm status on August 6. Later on the 6th, Alex became extratropical while 950 miles (1,530 km) east of Cape Race, Newfoundland, and lost its identity shortly thereafter.

== Preparations ==
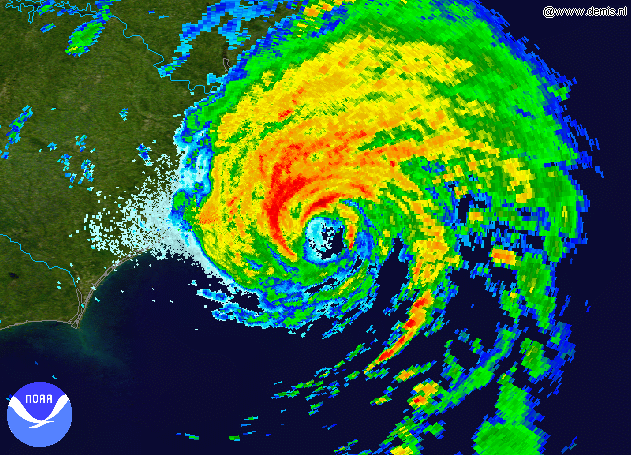
Radar image of Hurricane Alex.

Initially, forecasters believed Alex would remain weak, and on the first advisory the storm was predicted to make landfall as a minimal tropical storm. However, when strengthening became evident, the National Hurricane Center issued a hurricane warning from Cape Lookout to Oregon Inlet about 20 hours before hurricane conditions were experienced. In addition, a tropical storm warning existed for much of the North Carolina coastline as Alex paralleled the state.

Despite Tropical Storm Warnings, 3,500 tourists remained on the Outer Banks, though many planned to leave if Alex were to track closer or become stronger. No evacuations were ordered. Officials recommended residents to take precautions for the approaching hurricane. The National Weather Service in Morehead City issued a flash flood watch a day before the hurricane moved past the Outer Banks. The service also issued flash flooding warnings for Craven and Carteret Counties on the day of the hurricane's closest approach. In preparation for the hurricane, the Cape Lookout National Seashore was closed and evacuated. The National Park Service also closed Cape Point Campground.

== Impact ==
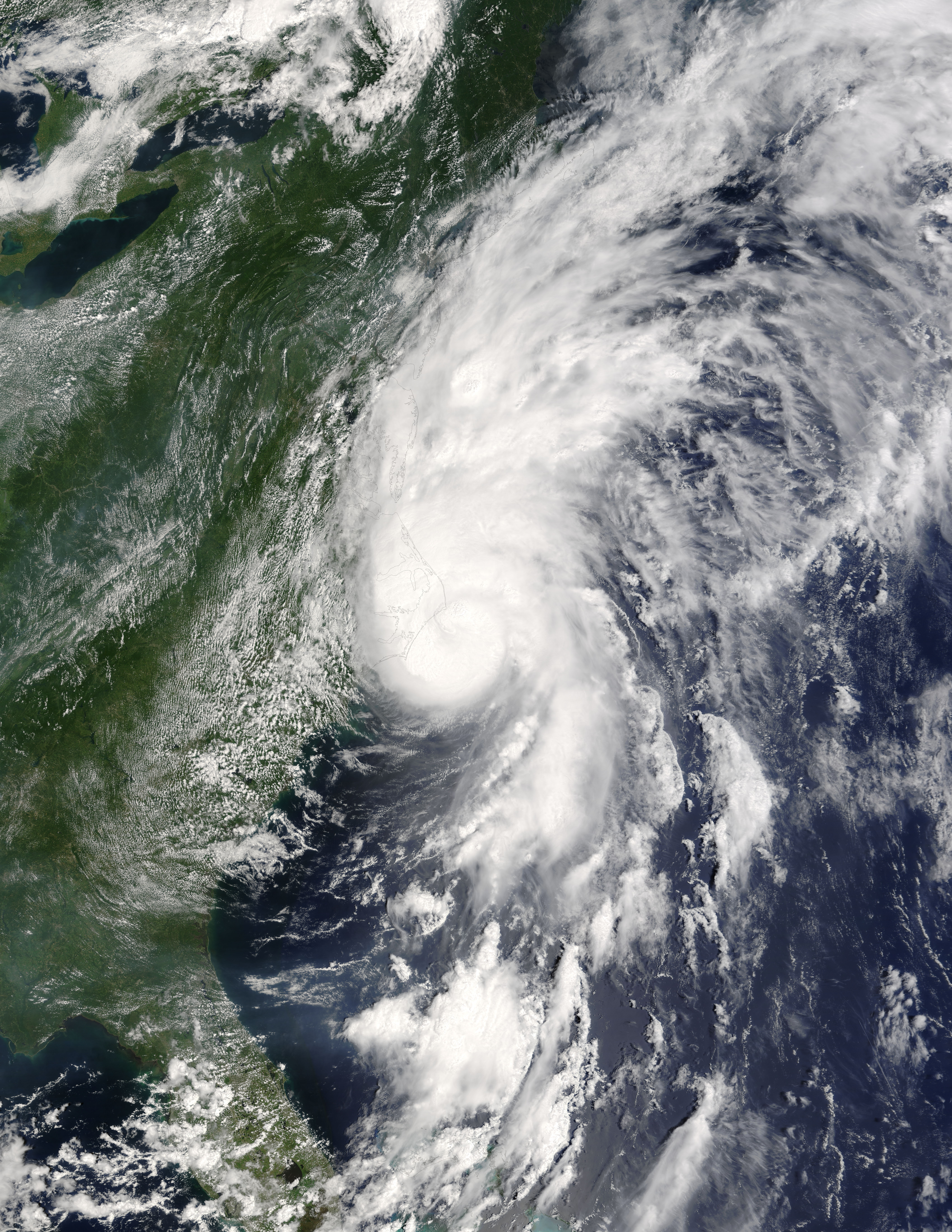
Hurricane Alex near Outer Banks on August 3

While drifting off the coast of Florida, Alex produced rip currents and strong waves along the North Carolina coast resulting in nine lifeguard rescues from the surf. Upon moving by the Outer Banks, a storm surge of up to 6 feet (1.8 m) occurred on the Pamlico Sound side of Buxton and Ocracoke Village. The flooding on Ocracoke Island was the worst since Hurricane Gloria nineteen years earlier. Elsewhere on the Outer Banks, waters rose 2–4 feet (0.61–1.22 m) above normal. Rainfall directly along the coast amounted to over 5 inches (130 mm), while Ocracoke experienced 7.55 inches (192 mm). Maximum sustained winds peaked at 88 mph (142 km/h), and gusts peaked at 115 mph (185 km/h) in Morehead City. Beach erosion was minor along much of North Carolina's coastline, with the exception of Ocracoke Island where erosion was significant.

Cape Fear experienced minor beach erosion. The erosion, combined with high waves, washed out a portion of a roadway. The heavy rainfall in the Outer Banks disabled over 200 cars and flooded nearly 500. Strong wind gusts left around 10,000 buildings without power. Many places were not restored for two to three days after the storm. Wind and storm surge damaged over 100 houses and buildings. Damage amounted to about $7.5 million (2004 USD). Two days after the storm passed, a man drowned off of Nags Head from strong rip currents and waves. This was the only direct casualty from the storm.

Alex's outer rainbands produced heavy rainfall across Virginia, peaking at over 7 inches (180 mm) in the center of the state. The rainfall caused localized flooding, but there was no reported damage in the state. In Rehoboth Beach, Delaware, rip currents produced by the storm injured three people. A few young children had to be rescued when they were trapped by a jetty. In New Jersey, the strong surf and rip currents hospitalized at least five swimmers.

Alex's extratropical remnants sank the Pink Lady, a rowboat carrying four British rowers attempting to break the record for fastest crossing from St. John's, Newfoundland to Falmouth, Cornwall. They were rescued by a Danish cargo ship, and injuries were limited to a mild concussion and a case of hypothermia. The rowers were roughly two weeks and 370 miles (600 km) from their destination. The group had been on track to break the 1896 record of 54 days by 10 days.

== Aftermath and records ==
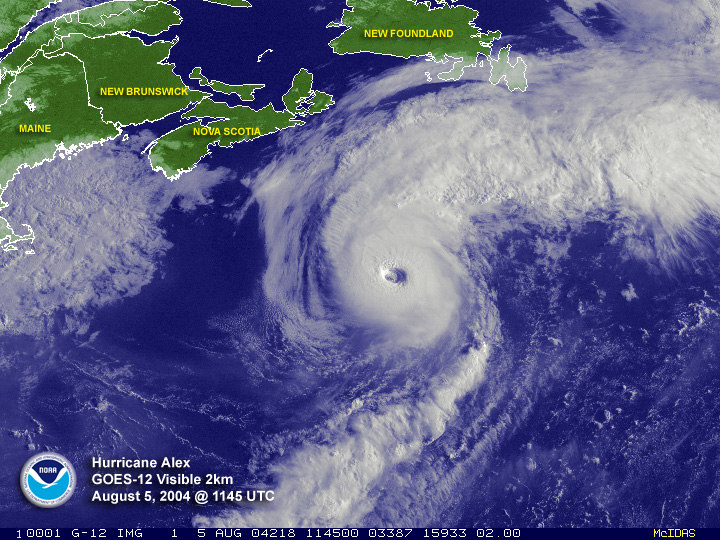
Category 3 Hurricane Alex north of 40° North on August 5

On Ocracoke Island, officials ordered for the evacuation of the thousands of tourists who stayed, believing that keeping tourists on the island would hinder cleanup efforts. The tourists were evacuated in school buses to Hatteras Island, where they could rent a car if needed. Tourists were also evacuated by ferry to Swan Quarter, in Hyde County, where they boarded school buses and were taken to nearby Washington NC to rent available cars or find accommodations. The island was re-opened to visitors on August 6, three days after the storm passed through. Evacuation was ordered again on Friday of the following week when another storm threatened to hit the Outer Banks, but did not do so. Dare County officials requested aid from the National Guard for the cleanup process. The North Carolina Department of Transportation was ready to clear the roads once the storm exited the area.

Alex marked the fifth-latest start to a hurricane season since 1952. The latest start to a hurricane season since 1952 was Hurricane Anita of the 1977 season, forming on August 29. Alex is only the second hurricane on record to have reached Category 3 strength north of 38°N latitude. The other storm was Hurricane Ellen in the 1973 Atlantic hurricane season; Alex was the stronger of the two. It is also one of only five hurricanes to be at major hurricane (Category 3 or higher) status within Canadian waters since 1950.

== See also ==
- Other storms of the same name
- Timeline of the 2004 Atlantic hurricane season
- List of North Carolina hurricanes (2000–present)
- Hurricane Ella (1978) – Another unusually northern major hurricane with a similar track that peaked as a Category 4 in Canadian waters
- Hurricane Gert (2017) – Strong Category 2 hurricane that caused large swells along the East Coast of the United States and took a similar path.
- Hurricane Chris (2018) – Took a similar path along the Gulf Stream.
