= List of storms named Gaston =

The name Gaston has been used for four tropical cyclones in the Atlantic Ocean.

- Hurricane Gaston (2004), caused heavy flooding in Richmond, Virginia.
- Tropical Storm Gaston (2010), short-lived tropical storm that dissipated before reaching land.
- Hurricane Gaston (2016), long-lived category 3 hurricane that churned in the open ocean.
- Tropical Storm Gaston (2022), formed in the middle of the ocean without affecting land.
