= Timeline of the 2004 Atlantic hurricane season =

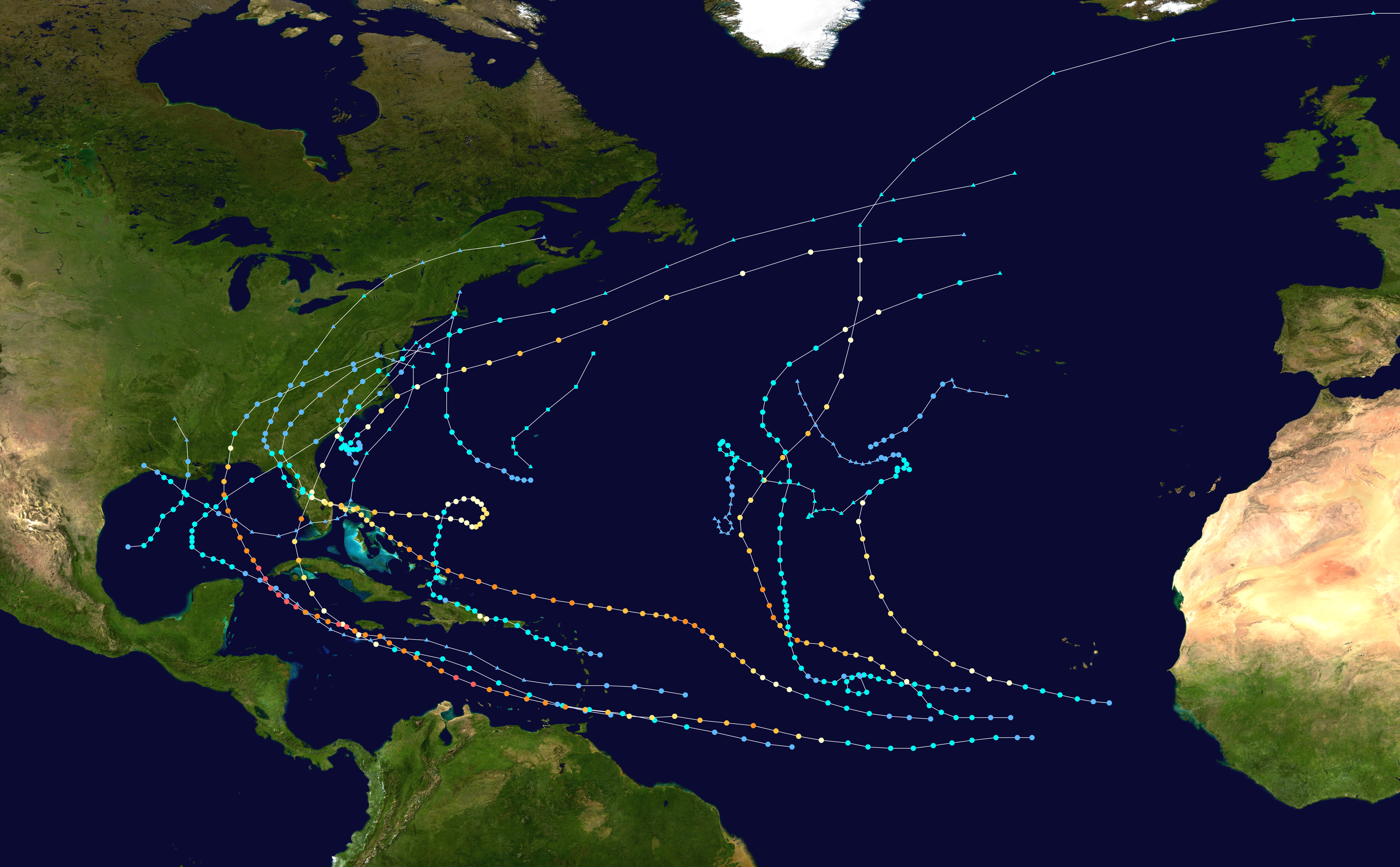
- Season summary map

Season boundaries
- First system formed: July 31, 2004
- Last system dissipated: December 3, 2004

Strongest system
- Name: Ivan
- Maximum winds: 165 mph (270 km/h) (1-minute sustained)
- Lowest pressure: 910 mbar (hPa; 26.87 inHg)

Longest lasting system
- Name: Ivan
- Duration: 17.5 days
Storm articles
- Hurricane Alex (2004)
- Tropical Storm Bonnie (2004)
- Hurricane Charley
- Hurricane Danielle (2004)
- Tropical Storm Earl (2004)
- Hurricane Frances
- Hurricane Gaston (2004)
- Hurricane Ivan
- Hurricane Jeanne
- Tropical Storm Matthew (2004)
- Subtropical Storm Nicole (2004)

The 2004 Atlantic hurricane season was notable as one of the deadliest and most costly Atlantic hurricane seasons on record. It officially began on June 1, 2004, and ended on November 30, although storm activity continued into December. This season had 16 tropical depressions, of which, 15 became named storms. Of these, 9 strengthened into hurricanes with 6 intensifying into major hurricanes. (Note: Hurricanes reaching Category 3 (wind speeds of 111 miles per hour (179 km/h)) or higher on the 5-level Saffir–Simpson wind speed scale are considered major hurricanes.) The most noteworthy storms for the season were the five named storms that made landfall in the U.S. states of Florida and Alabama, three of them with at least 115 mph (185 km/h) sustained winds (major hurricane strength): Tropical Storm Bonnie, Charley, Frances, Ivan, and Jeanne. This is the only time in recorded history that four hurricanes affected the U.S. State of Florida although one of the four, Ivan, brought hurricane-force winds to the state without making a landfall there.

This timeline documents tropical cyclone formations, strengthening, weakening, landfalls, extratropical transitions, and dissipations during the season. It includes information that was not released throughout the season, meaning that data from post-storm reviews by the National Hurricane Center, such as a storm that was not initially warned upon, has been included.

The time stamp for each event is first stated using Coordinated Universal Time (UTC), the 24-hour clock where 00:00 = midnight UTC. The NHC uses both UTC and the time zone where the center of the tropical cyclone is currently located. The time zones utilized (east to west) prior to 2020 were: Atlantic, Eastern, and Central. In this timeline, the respective area time is included in parentheses. Additionally, figures for maximum sustained winds and position estimates are rounded to the nearest 5 units (miles, or kilometers), following National Hurricane Center practice. Direct wind observations are rounded to the nearest whole number. Atmospheric pressures are listed to the nearest millibar and nearest hundredth of an inch of mercury.

== Timeline of storms ==
=== June ===
June 1

- The Atlantic hurricane season officially begins.

=== July ===
July 31

- 2 p.m. EDT (1800 UTC) – Tropical Depression One forms 200 miles (325 km) (Note: The figures for maximum sustained winds and position estimates are rounded to the nearest 5 units (knots, miles, or kilometers), following the convention used in the National Hurricane Center's operational products for each storm. All other units are rounded to the nearest digit.) east of Jacksonville, Florida.

=== August ===
Hurricane Alex off the mid-Atlantic coast on August 4

August 1

- 2 p.m. EDT (1800 UTC) – Tropical Depression One strengthens into Tropical Storm Alex.

August 3

- 2 a.m. EDT (0600 UTC) – Tropical Storm Alex strengthens into Hurricane Alex.
- 8 a.m. EDT (1200 UTC) – Hurricane Alex reaches Category 2 strength.
- 8 a.m. EDT (1200 UTC) – Tropical Depression Two forms near the Lesser Antilles, 415 miles (665 km) east of the Lesser Antilles.
- 1 p.m. EDT (1700 UTC) – Hurricane Alex skirts the Outer Banks of North Carolina but does not make landfall.

August 4

- 2 p.m. EDT (1800 UTC) – Tropical Depression Two degenerates into a tropical wave in the eastern Caribbean Sea.
- 8 p.m. EDT (0000 UTC, August 5) – Hurricane Alex reaches Category 3 strength. The storm is centered 445 miles (715 km) southwest of Halifax, Nova Scotia, the second furthest north a hurricane has reached this strength.

August 6

- 8 a.m. AST (1200 UTC) – Hurricane Alex weakens into a tropical storm.
- 7 a.m. CDT (1200 UTC) – Tropical Depression Two regenerates in the Yucatán Channel.
- 2 p.m. AST (1800 UTC) – Tropical Storm Alex becomes extratropical east of Newfoundland.

August 9

- 8 a.m. AST (1200 UTC) – Tropical Depression Three forms near the Windward Islands, 115 miles (80 km) south-southeast of Barbados.
- 7 a.m. CDT (1200 UTC) – Tropical Depression Two strengthens into Tropical Storm Bonnie in the southern Gulf of Mexico.

August 10

- 2 a.m. AST (0600 UTC) – Tropical Depression Three strengthens into Tropical Storm Charley.

August 11

- 2 p.m. EDT (1800 UTC) – Tropical Storm Charley strengthens into Hurricane Charley.
- 8 p.m. EDT (0000 UTC, August 12) – Hurricane Charley skirts the southern coast of Jamaica.

August 12

- 8 a.m. EDT (1200 UTC) – Hurricane Charley passes between Grand Cayman and Little Cayman.
- 10 a.m. EDT (1400 UTC) – Tropical Storm Bonnie makes landfall near Apalachicola, Florida with 45 mph (72 km/h) winds.
- 11 a.m. EDT (1500 UTC) – Hurricane Charley reaches Category 2 intensity.
- 2 p.m. EDT (1800 UTC) – Tropical Storm Bonnie weakens into a tropical depression.

August 13

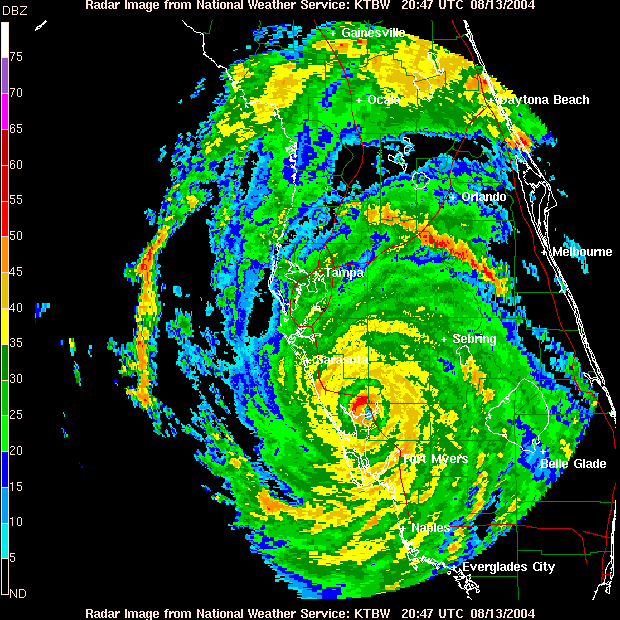
Hurricane Charley prior to moving ashore on South Florida on August 13

- 12:30 a.m. EDT (0430 UTC) – Hurricane Charley makes its first landfall in Cuba as a Category 3 storm with 120 mph (190 km/h) winds, but weakening back down to Category 2 as it leaves the island just west of Havana.
- 8 a.m. AST (1200 UTC) – Tropical Depression Four forms 240 miles (390 km) south-southeast of Cape Verde.
- 10 a.m. EDT (1400 UTC) – Hurricane Charley reaches Category 3 intensity again.
- 1 p.m. EDT (1700 UTC) – Hurricane Charley reaches Category 4 intensity.
- 2 p.m. AST (1800 UTC) – Tropical Depression Five forms 1,150 miles (1,850 km) east of the Windward Islands.
- 3:45 p.m. EDT (1945 UTC) – Hurricane Charley makes its second landfall just West of Fort Myers, Florida with 150 mph (240 km/h) winds.
- 4:45 p.m. EDT (2045 UTC) – Hurricane Charley makes its third landfall at Punta Gorda, Florida with 145 mph (233 km/h) winds.
- 8 p.m. EDT (0000 UTC, August 14) – Tropical Depression Bonnie degenerates into a remnant low.
- 8 p.m. AST (0000 UTC, August 14) – Tropical Depression Four strengthens into Tropical Storm Danielle.
- 10:30 p.m. EDT (0130 UTC, August 14) – Hurricane Charley crosses central Florida, passing near Orlando.
- 11:30 p.m. EDT (0330 UTC, August 14) – Hurricane Charley exits Florida near Daytona Beach.

August 14

- 10 a.m. EDT (1400 UTC) – Hurricane Charley makes a fourth landfall near Cape Romain, South Carolina with 80 mph (129 km/h) winds and moves back offshore.
- 12 p.m. EDT (1600 UTC) – Hurricane Charley makes a fifth landfall near North Myrtle Beach, South Carolina with 75 mph (121 km/h).
- 2 p.m. EDT (1800 UTC) – Hurricane Charley weakens into a tropical storm.

- 2 p.m. AST (1800 UTC) – Tropical Depression Five strengthens into Tropical Storm Earl.

- 8 p.m. EDT (0000 UTC, August 15) – Tropical Storm Charley becomes extratropical over South Carolina.

- 8 p.m. AST (0000 UTC, August 15) – Tropical Storm Danielle strengthens into Hurricane Danielle.

August 15

- 10 a.m. EDT (1400 UTC) – Tropical Storm Earl passes just south of Grenada and enters the Caribbean.
- 2 p.m. AST (1800 UTC) – Hurricane Danielle reaches Category 2 intensity.
- 8 p.m. EDT (0000 UTC, August 16) – Tropical Storm Earl degenerates into a tropical wave.

August 18

- 8 a.m. AST (1200 UTC) – Hurricane Danielle weakens into a tropical storm.

August 20

- 2 p.m. AST (1800 UTC) – Tropical Storm Danielle weakens into a tropical depression.

August 21

- 2 p.m. AST (1800 UTC) – Danielle dissipates into a broad area of low-pressure.

August 24

- 8 p.m. EDT (0000 UTC, August 25) – Tropical Depression Six forms 750 miles (1,200 km) west-southwest of Cape Verde.

August 25

- 2 p.m. EDT (1800 UTC) – Tropical Depression Six strengthens into Tropical Storm Frances.

August 26

- 2 p.m. EDT (1800 UTC) – Tropical Storm Frances strengthens into Hurricane Frances.

August 27

- 8 a.m. EDT (1200 UTC) – Hurricane Frances reaches Category 2 strength.
- 8 a.m. EDT (1200 UTC) – Tropical Depression Seven forms 130 miles (215 km) east-southeast of Charleston, South Carolina.
- 2 p.m. EDT (1800 UTC) – Hurricane Frances reaches Category 3 strength.
- 2 p.m. EDT (1800 UTC) – A tropical depression forms 230 miles (370 km) south of Bermuda.

August 28

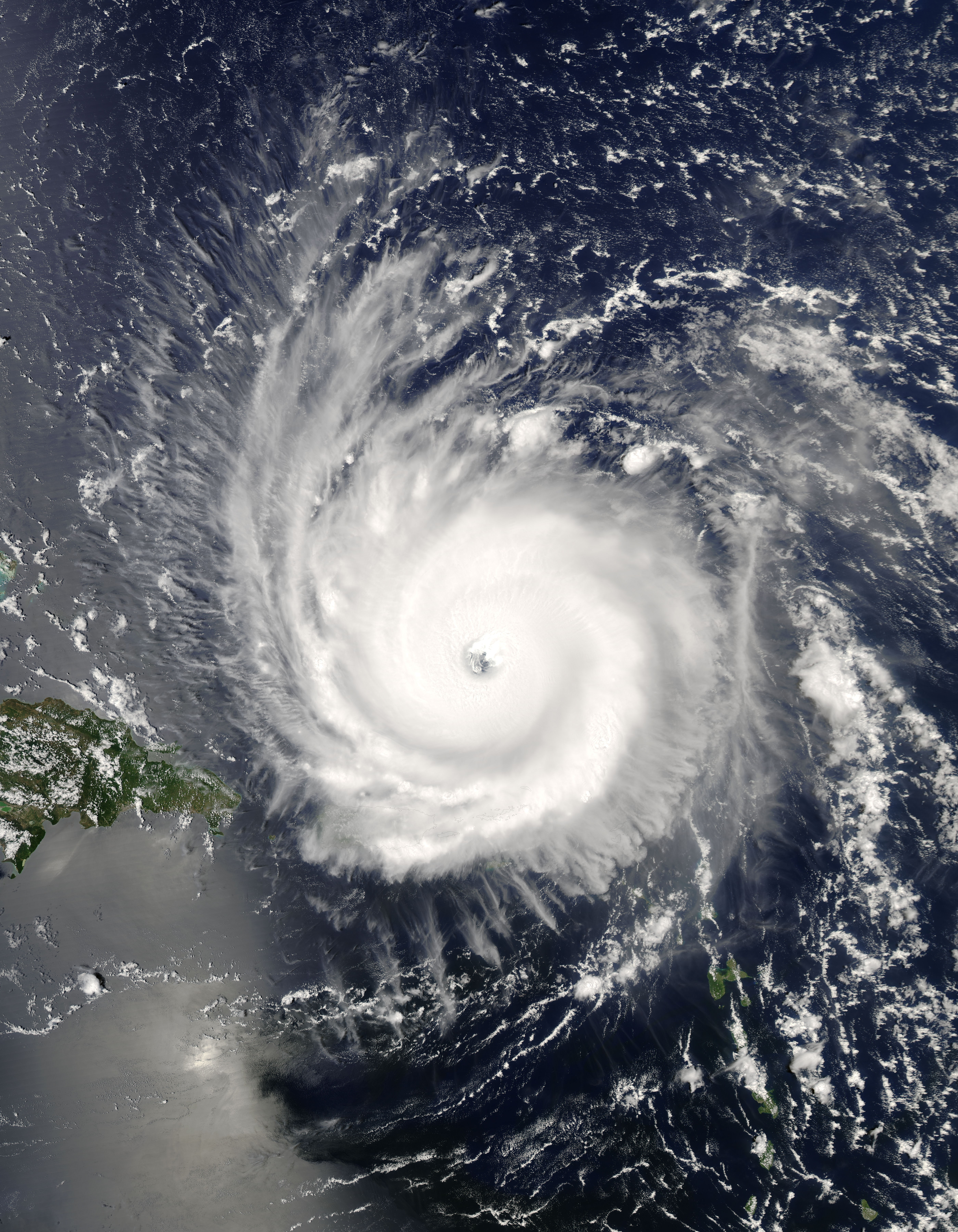
Hurricane Frances on August 31

- 2 a.m. EDT (0600 UTC) – Tropical Depression Seven strengthens into Tropical Storm Gaston.
- 2 p.m. EDT (1800 UTC) – Hurricane Frances reaches Category 4 strength.

August 29

- 8 a.m. EDT (1200 UTC) – Tropical Storm Gaston strengthens into Hurricane Gaston.
- 8 a.m. EDT (1200 UTC) – The tropical depression to the south of Bermuda strengthens into Tropical Storm Hermine.
- 10 a.m. EDT (1400 UTC) – Hurricane Gaston makes landfall near Awendaw, South Carolina with 75 mph (121 km/h) winds.
- 8 p.m. EDT (0000 UTC, August 30) – Tropical Storm Gaston weakens into a tropical depression.

August 30

- 8 p.m. EDT (0000 UTC, August 31) – Tropical Depression Gaston re-strengthens into a tropical storm.

August 31

- 2 a.m. EDT (0600 UTC) – Tropical Storm Hermine makes landfall near New Bedford, Massachusetts with 40 mph (64 km/h) winds.
- 8 a.m. EDT (1200 UTC) – Tropical Storm Hermine becomes extratropical.

=== September ===
September 1

- 8 a.m. EDT (1200 UTC) – Tropical Storm Gaston becomes extratropical.

September 2

- 2 p.m. EDT (1800 UTC) – Tropical Depression Nine forms about 550 miles (900 km) south-west of Cape Verde.
- 3:30 p.m. EDT (1930 UTC) – Hurricane Frances strikes San Salvador Island with 125 mph (201 km/h) winds.

September 3

- 1:30 a.m. EDT (0530 UTC) – Hurricane Frances strikes Cat Island with 115 mph (185 km/h) winds.
- 2 a.m. EDT (0600 UTC) – Tropical Depression Nine strengthens into Tropical Storm Ivan.
- 6 a.m. EDT (1000 UTC) – Hurricane Frances strikes Eleuthera with 110 mph (180 km/h) winds.

September 4

- 6 a.m. EDT (1000 UTC) – Hurricane Frances strikes Grand Bahama with 105 mph (169 km/h) winds.

September 5

- 12:30 a.m. EDT (0430 UTC) – Hurricane Frances makes landfall on the east coast of Florida with 105 mph (169 km/h) winds.
- 2 a.m. EDT (0600 UTC) – Tropical Storm Ivan strengthens into Hurricane Ivan.
- 8 a.m. EDT (1200 UTC) – Hurricane Ivan reaches Category 2 strength.
- 2 p.m. EDT (1800 UTC) – Hurricane Ivan reaches Category 3 strength.
- 2 p.m. EDT (1800 UTC) – Hurricane Frances weakens into a tropical storm.
- 8 p.m. EDT (0000 UTC, September 6) – Hurricane Ivan reaches Category 4 strength.
- approximately 11 p.m. EDT (0300 UTC, September 6) – Tropical Storm Frances emerges over the Gulf of Mexico.

September 6

- 2 p.m. EDT (1800 UTC) – Tropical Storm Frances makes its second landfall near St. Marks, Florida with 65 mph (105 km/h) winds.

September 7

- 2 a.m. EDT (0600 UTC) – Tropical Storm Frances weakens into a tropical depression.
- 5 a.m. AST (0900 UTC) – Tropical Depression Ten forms 725 miles (1150 km) west-southwest of the Azores.
- 5:30 p.m. EDT (2130 UTC) – Hurricane Ivan passes just south of Grenada with 125 mph (201 km/h) winds.

September 9

- 2 a.m. AST (0600 UTC) – Hurricane Ivan reaches Category 5 strength less than 100 miles (160 km) away from Aruba.
- 8 a.m. AST (1200 UTC) – Tropical Depression Ten degenerates into a remnant low.

September 10

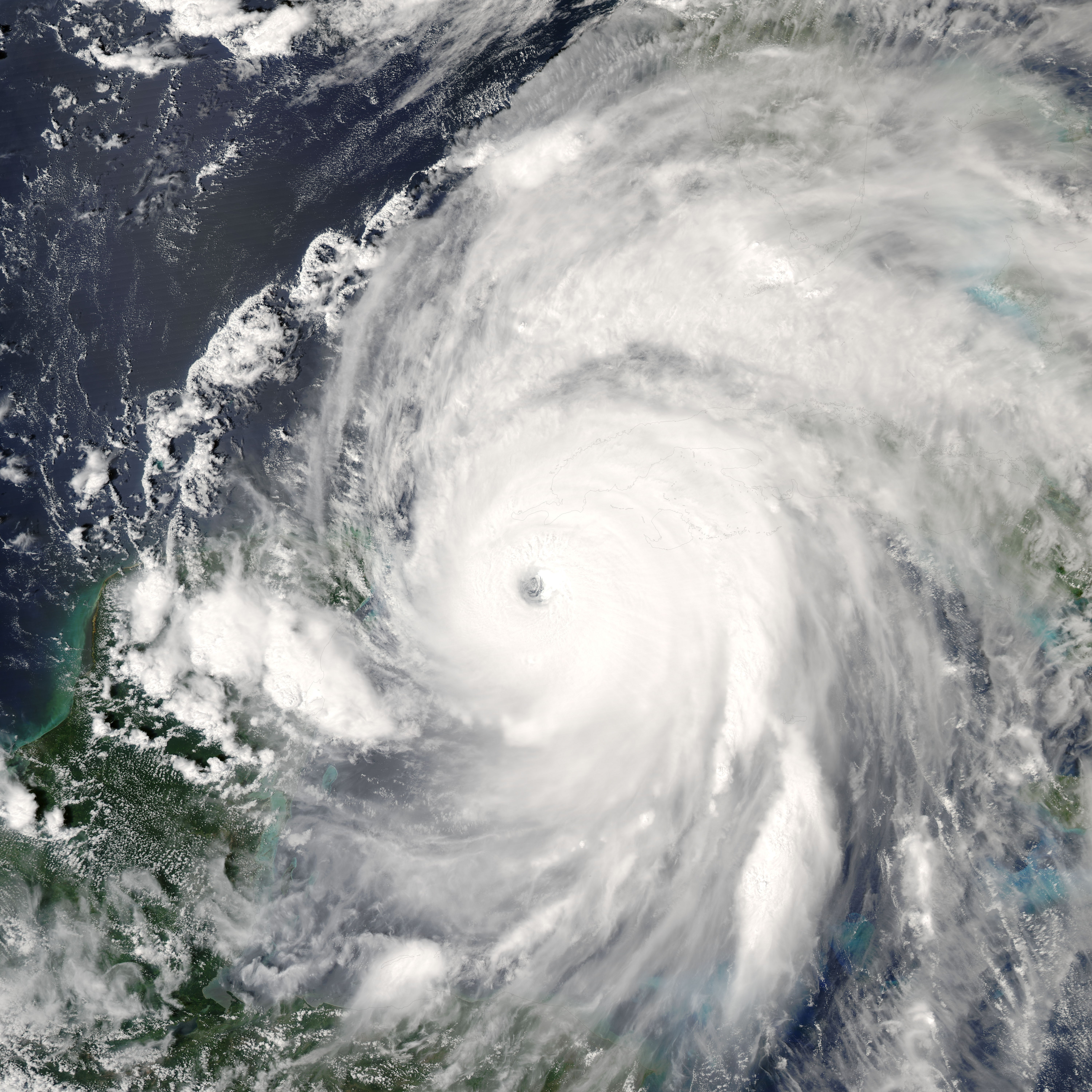
Hurricane Ivan on September 13

- 11:30 p.m. EDT (0330 UTC, September 11) – Hurricane Ivan passes just south of Jamaica with 150 mph (240 km/h) winds.

September 11

- 8 p.m. EDT (0000 UTC, September 12) – Hurricane Ivan has a recorded minimum pressure of 910 millibars, making it the then sixth most intense Atlantic hurricane on record.

September 12

- 10:45 a.m. EDT (1415 UTC) – Hurricane Ivan passes close to Grand Cayman with 150 mph (240 km/h) winds.

September 13

- 2 p.m. AST (1800 UTC) – Tropical Depression Eleven forms 70 miles (110 km) east-southeast of Guadeloupe.
- 9 p.m. EDT (0100 UTC, September 14) – Hurricane Ivan passes near the western tip of Cuba with 160 mph (260 km/h) winds.

September 14

- 12 a.m. AST (0400 UTC) – Tropical Depression Eleven makes landfall on Guadeloupe with 35 mph (56 km/h) winds.
- 8 a.m. AST (1200 UTC) – Tropical Depression Eleven strengthens into Tropical Storm Jeanne.

September 15

- 12 p.m. EDT (1600 UTC) – Tropical Storm Jeanne makes landfall near Yabucoa, Puerto Rico with 60 mph (97 km/h) winds.

September 16

- 2 a.m. AST (0600 UTC) – Tropical Depression Twelve forms 390 miles (630 km) southwest of the Cape Verde islands.
- 1:50 a.m. CDT (0650 UTC) – Hurricane Ivan makes landfall near Gulf Shores, Alabama with 120 mph (190 km/h) winds.
- 7 a.m. AST (1100 UTC) – Tropical Storm Jeanne strengthens into Hurricane Jeanne as it makes landfall on the Dominican Republic with 80 mph (129 km/h) winds.
- 1 p.m. CDT (1800 UTC) – Hurricane Ivan weakens into a tropical storm.
- 2 p.m. AST (1800 UTC) – Tropical Depression Twelve strengthens into Tropical Storm Karl.
- 7 p.m. CDT (0000 UTC, September 17) – Tropical Storm Ivan weakens into a tropical depression
- 8 p.m. AST (0000 UTC, September 17) – Hurricane Jeanne weakens into a tropical storm as it interacts with Hispaniola.

September 17

- 2 p.m. AST (1800 UTC) – Tropical Storm Jeanne weakens into a tropical depression.
- 8 p.m. AST (0000 UTC, September 18) – Tropical Depression Jeanne re-strengthens to Tropical Storm Jeanne.
- 8 p.m. EDT (0000 UTC, September 18) – Tropical Storm Karl strengthens into Hurricane Karl.

September 18

- 2 a.m. EDT (0600 UTC) – Hurricane Karl reaches Category 2 strength.
- 2 p.m. EDT (1800 UTC) – Tropical Depression Ivan becomes extratropical while crossing Virginia. Some remnants travel north, others loop back south.

September 19

- 2 a.m. EDT (0600 UTC) – Hurricane Karl reaches Category 3 strength.
- 2 p.m. EDT (1800 UTC) – Tropical Depression Thirteen forms 520 miles (830 km) west-southwest of the Cape Verde islands.

September 20

- 2 a.m. EDT (0600 UTC) – Hurricane Karl reaches Category 4 strength.
- 8 a.m. AST (1200 UTC) – Tropical Depression Thirteen strengthens into Tropical Storm Lisa.
- 2 p.m. AST (1800 UTC) – Tropical Storm Jeanne strengthens back into Hurricane Jeanne.

September 22

- 2 a.m. AST (0600 UTC) – Hurricane Jeanne reaches Category 2 strength.
- 1 p.m. CDT (1800 UTC) – A partial remnant of former Hurricane Ivan regenerates into Tropical Depression Ivan in the Gulf of Mexico.
- 7 p.m. CDT (0000 UTC, September 23) – Tropical Depression Ivan strengthens into Tropical Storm Ivan, nearly a week after being classified as extratropical.

September 23

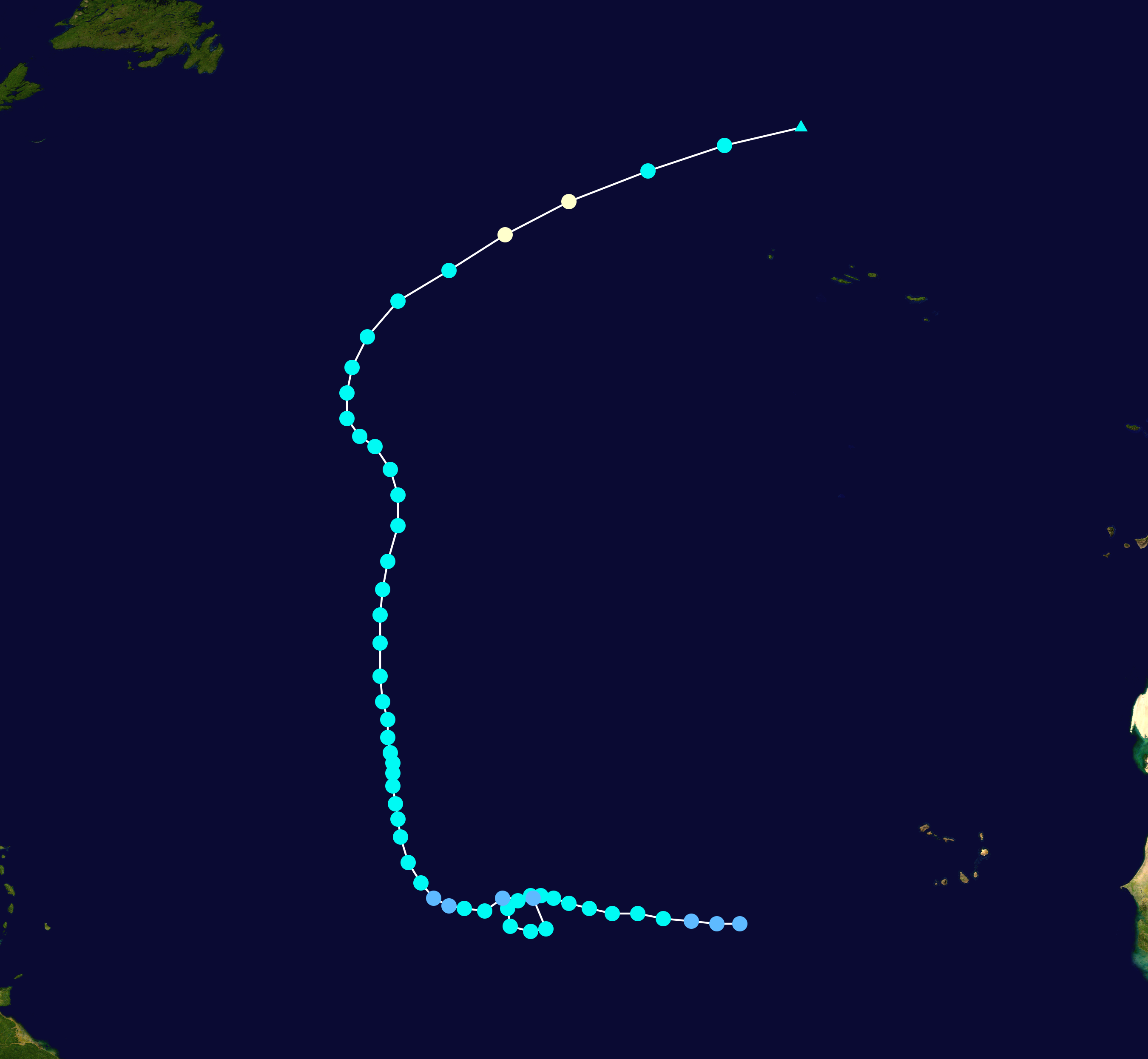
Hurricane Lisa track map

- 2 p.m. AST (1800 UTC) – Tropical Storm Lisa weakens into a tropical depression.
- 7 p.m. CDT (0000 UTC, September 24) – Tropical Storm Ivan weakens into a tropical depression.
- 9 p.m. CDT (0200 UTC, September 24) – Tropical Depression Ivan makes its second landfall near Cameron, Louisiana with 30 mph (48 km/h) winds.

September 24

- 2 a.m. AST (0600 UTC) – Tropical Depression Lisa regains tropical storm strength.
- 7 a.m. CDT (1200 UTC) – Tropical Depression Ivan dissipates over Texas.
- 2 p.m. AST (1800 UTC) – Tropical Storm Lisa weakens into a tropical depression again.
- 8 p.m. EDT (0000 UTC, September 25) – Hurricane Karl becomes extratropical, but remains a strong storm heading north.

September 25

- 2 a.m. AST (0600 UTC) – Tropical Depression Lisa becomes Tropical Storm Lisa for the third time.
- 8 a.m. AST (1200 UTC) – Hurricane Jeanne reaches Category 3 strength while it makes its third landfall on Abaco with 115 mph (185 km/h) winds.
- 2 p.m. AST (1800 UTC) – Hurricane Jeanne passes near Grand Bahama with 120 mph (190 km/h) winds.

September 26

- 12 a.m. EDT (0400 UTC) – Hurricane Jeanne makes landfall near Stuart, Florida with 120 mph (190 km/h) winds.
- 2 p.m. EDT (1800 UTC) – Hurricane Jeanne weakens into a tropical storm.

September 27

- 2 p.m. EDT (1800 UTC) – Tropical Storm Jeanne weakens into a tropical depression.

September 28

- 8 p.m. EDT (0000 UTC, September 29) – Tropical Depression Jeanne becomes extratropical.

=== October ===
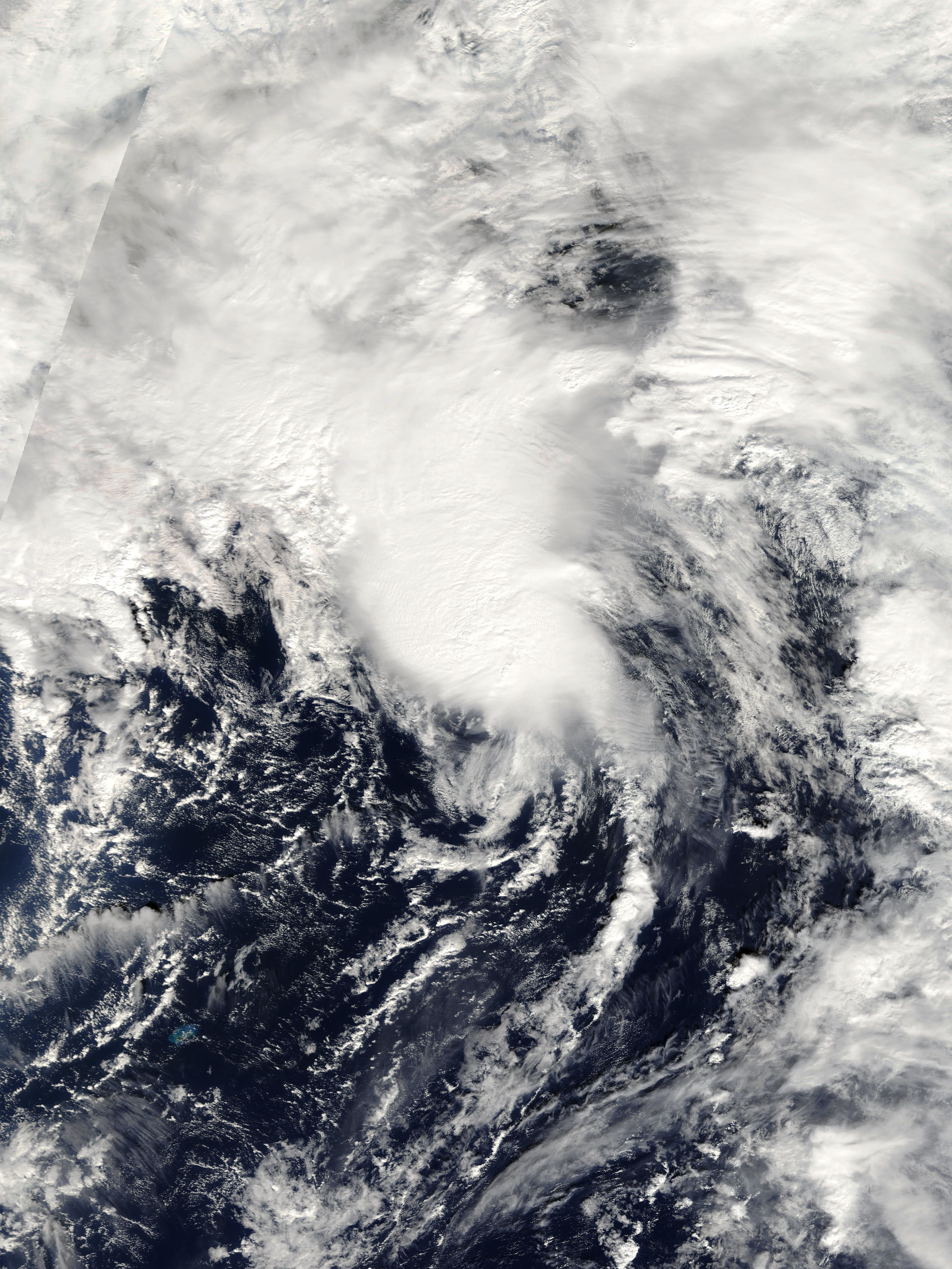
Subtropical Storm Nicole on October 11

October 2

- 2 a.m. AST (0600 UTC) – Tropical Storm Lisa strengthens into Hurricane Lisa.
- 2 p.m. AST (1800 UTC) – Hurricane Lisa weakens into a tropical storm.

October 3

- 2 a.m. AST (0600 UTC) – Tropical Storm Lisa becomes extratropical.

October 8

- 7 a.m. CDT (1200 UTC) – Tropical Depression Fourteen forms 210 miles (330 km) southeast of Brownsville, Texas.
- 1 p.m. CDT (1800 UTC) – Tropical Depression Fourteen strengthens into Tropical Storm Matthew.

October 10

- 2 a.m. AST (0600 UTC) – A low-pressure system 140 miles (220 km) southwest of Bermuda becomes Subtropical Storm Nicole.
- 6 a.m. CDT (1100 UTC) – Tropical Storm Matthew makes landfall on the Louisiana coast south of Houma with 40 mph (64 km/h) winds.
- 7 a.m. CDT (1200 UTC) – Tropical Storm Matthew weakens into a tropical depression.
- 7 p.m. CDT (0000 UTC, October 11) – Tropical Depression Matthew becomes extratropical.
- 8 p.m. AST (0000 UTC, October 12) – Subtropical Storm Nicole is absorbed by a larger non-tropical cyclone.

=== November ===
November 29

- 7 a.m. EST (1200 UTC) – Subtropical Storm Otto forms 1,150 miles (1,850 km) east-southeast of Bermuda from a non-tropical low.

November 30

- 7 a.m. EST (1200 UTC) – Subtropical Storm Otto gains tropical characteristics and becomes Tropical Storm Otto.
- The Atlantic hurricane season officially ends.

=== December ===
December 2

- 7 a.m. EST (1200 UTC) – Tropical Storm Otto weakens into a tropical depression.

December 3

- 1 a.m. EST (0600 UTC) – Tropical Depression Otto dissipates into a remnant low, the last storm of the season.

== See also ==
- Timeline of the 2004 Pacific hurricane season
- 2004 Pacific typhoon season
