= List of storms named Alex =

The name Alex has been used for twelve tropical cyclones worldwide: five in the Atlantic Ocean, four in the Western Pacific Ocean and three in the South-West Indian Ocean. The name has also been used for one extratropical European windstorm. It replaced the name "Andrew", which was retired after the 1992 season.

In the Atlantic:

- Tropical Storm Alex (1998), a weak tropical storm that never affected land.
- Hurricane Alex (2004), a hurricane that came within 10 miles (16 km) of the Outer Banks of North Carolina, then strengthened to Category 3 once clear of land.
- Hurricane Alex (2010), a Category 2 hurricane that made landfall in Belize as a tropical storm and passed over the Yucatán Peninsula before making landfall in Tamaulipas, Mexico, at maximum intensity.
- Hurricane Alex (2016), a rare Category 1 hurricane that formed in mid-January, made landfall in the Azores causing heavy rainfall and gusty winds.
- Tropical Storm Alex (2022), a short-lived tropical storm that produced heavy rainfall in the Yucatán Peninsula, western Cuba and South Florida while developing.

In the Western Pacific:

- Tropical Storm Alex (1980) (T8020, 24W), a short-lived tropical storm that formed to the north of Iwo Jima
- Typhoon Alex (1984) (T8403, 03W, Biring), a Category 1 typhoon that passed north over Taiwan before dissipating over South Korea
- Typhoon Alex (1987) (T8708, 08W, Etang), a minimal typhoon that brushed north Taiwan before striking mainland China; caused little damage from the typhoon, but its remnants contributed to some significant flooding in Korea
- Tropical Depression/Storm Alex (1998) (19W), a weak tropical cyclone that formed to the east of the Philippines before it was absorbed by the more powerful Typhoon Zeb; Japan Meteorological Agency analyzed it as a tropical depression, not as a tropical storm, but the Joint Typhoon Weather Center did call it a storm.

In the South-West Indian:

- Cyclone Alex (1981), a Category 2 cyclone that stayed well out to sea and did not approach any land
- Cyclone Alex (1990), a Category 5 cyclone (on the Australian scale) that formed in the Timor Sea and moved to the southwest without approaching land
- Cyclone Alex (2001), a tropical storm that formed to the north of the Cocos (Keeling) Islands before passing west of 90°E, when it was renamed Andre

In Europe:

- Storm Alex (2020), a powerful non-tropical storm that caused widespread wind and flood damage across Europe
