= Hurricane Gaston (2004) =

Category 1 Atlantic hurricane in 2004

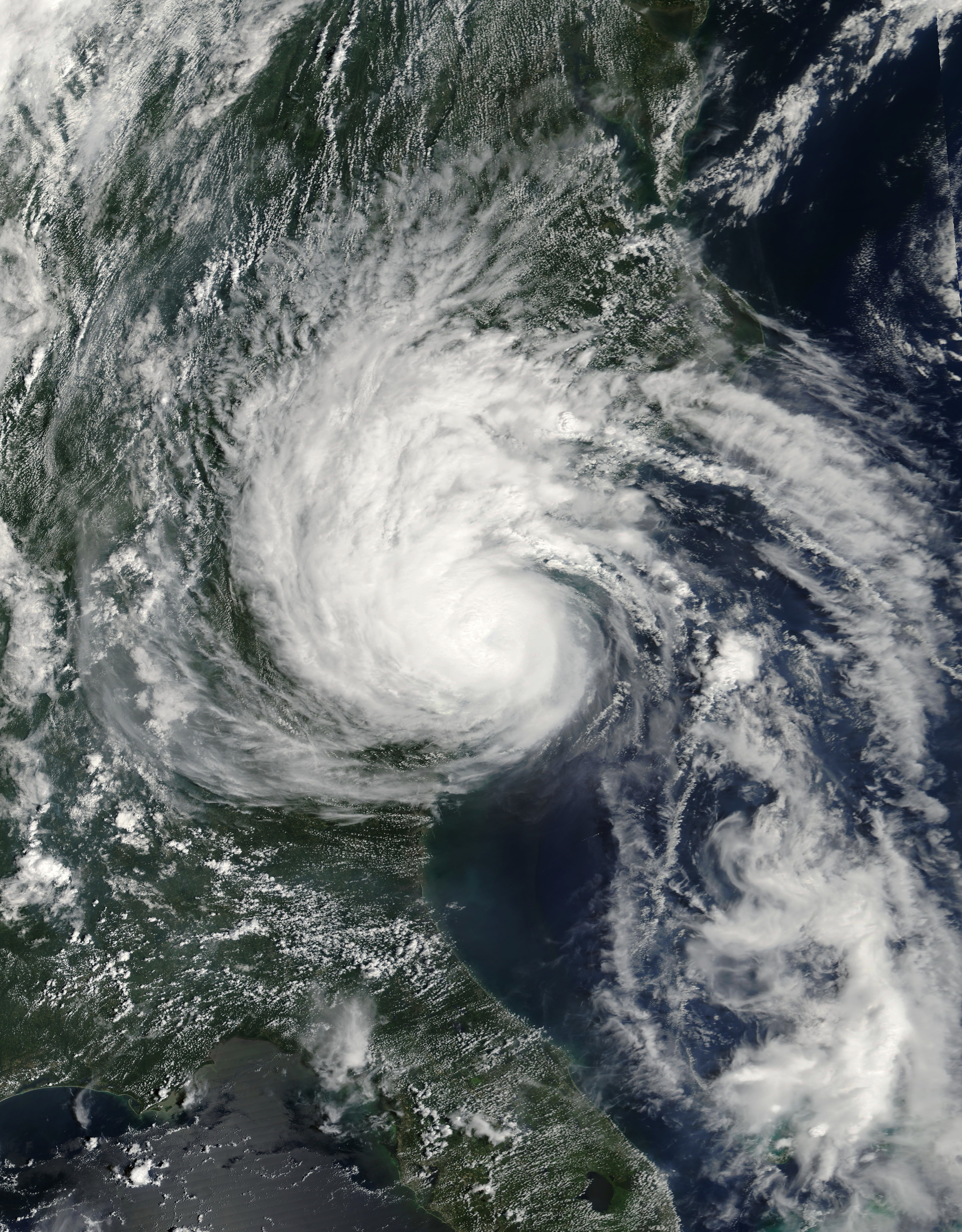
- Gaston at its peak intensity on August 29

Meteorological history
- Formed: August 27, 2004
- Extratropical: September 1, 2004
- Dissipated: September 3, 2004

Category 1 hurricane
- 1-minute sustained (SSHWS/NWS)
- Highest winds: 75 mph (120 km/h)
- Lowest pressure: 985 mbar (hPa); 29.09 inHg

Overall effects
- Fatalities: 9
- Damage: $130 million (2004 USD)
- Areas affected: The Carolinas, Mid-Atlantic states (especially Virginia), New England, Atlantic Canada
- IBTrACS
- Part of the 2004 Atlantic hurricane season

Hurricane Gaston was the third of five hurricanes to make landfall in the United States during the 2004 Atlantic hurricane season, which produced deadly floods in and around Richmond, Virginia. Gaston originated toward the end of August 2004 from a dissipating cold front, the same one that also spawned Tropical Storm Hermine. Gaston developed on August 27, off the coast of South Carolina. It slowly intensified while moving toward the coast, and Gaston made landfall at Awendaw, South Carolina, between Charleston and McClellanville, as a Category 1 hurricane on the Saffir-Simpson scale with maximum sustained winds of 75 mph (120 km/h). Although it weakened over land into a tropical depression, Gaston drew moisture to produce supercell thunderstorms across central Virginia. The heaviest rainfall from Gaston was 12.60 in (320 mm), measured in the West End of Richmond. Gaston reintensified into a tropical storm by the time it emerged into the western Atlantic Ocean. It passed southeast of Nantucket before transitioning into an extratropical cyclone on September 1. The remnants of Gaston lasted until September 3 when they were absorbed by a larger extratropical storm south of Iceland.

Gaston struck South Carolina a few weeks after Hurricane Charley hit the state, marking the first time since the 1959 season that two tropical cyclones struck the state in the same year. Gaston added to Charley's rainfall, leading to river flooding and road closures. About 172,000 people lost power in South Carolina. Gaston spawned 20 tornadoes along its path, most of them weak. The worst flooding damage occurred in the Richmond, Virginia area. There, nine people died, eight of them directly related to the storm. The floods left 20 blocks of buildings condemned in Richmond's Shockoe Bottom district, where the waters reached 10 ft (3.0 m) deep. Gaston also produced rainfall that had damaging effects as far north as New York. Nationwide damage totaled $130 million (2004 USD).

== Meteorological history ==
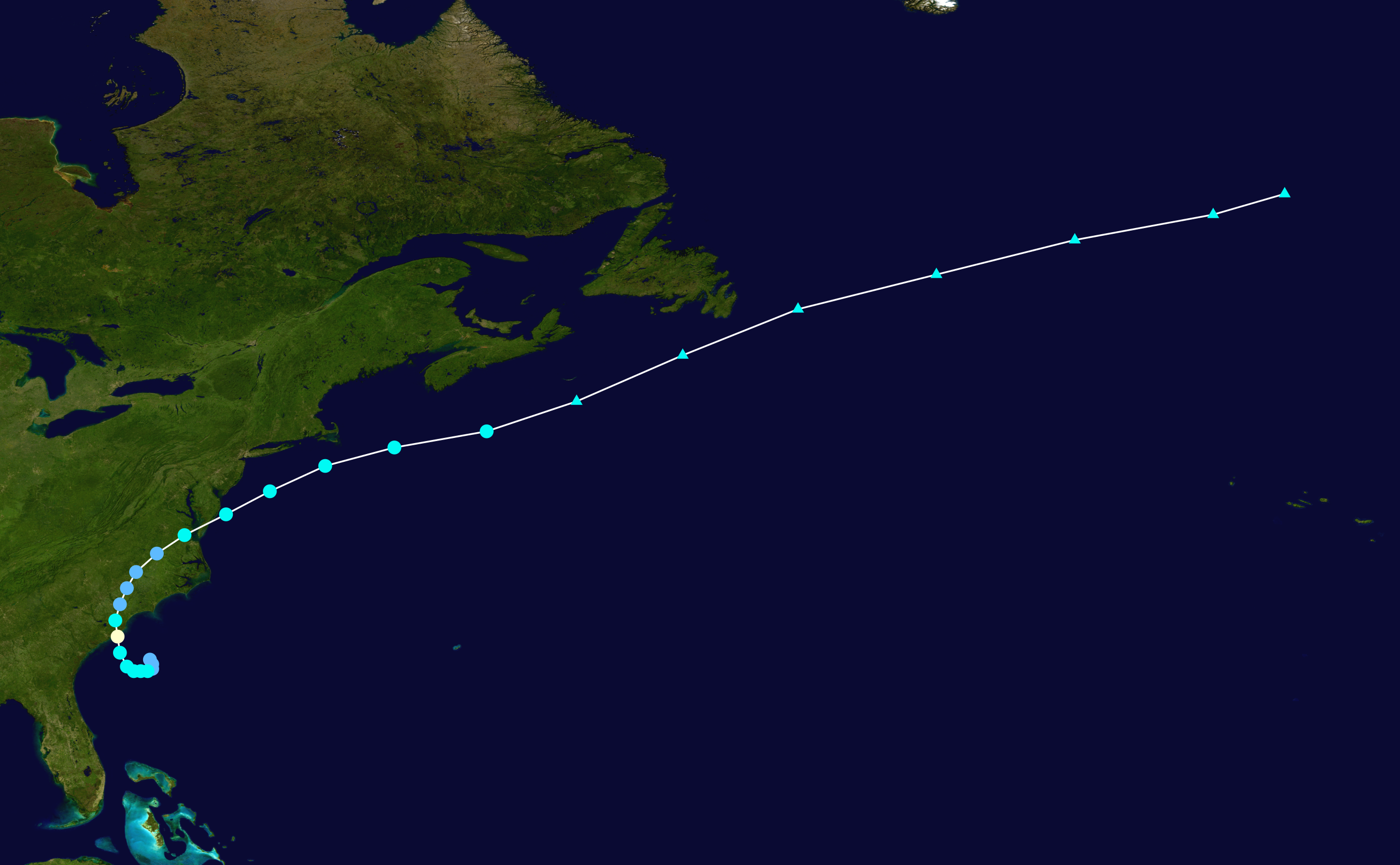
Map plotting the storm's track and intensity, according to the Saffir–Simpson scale Map key Saffir–Simpson scale Tropical depression (≤38 mph, ≤62 km/h) Tropical storm (39–73 mph, 63–118 km/h) Category 1 (74–95 mph, 119–153 km/h) Category 2 (96–110 mph, 154–177 km/h) Category 3 (111–129 mph, 178–208 km/h) Category 4 (130–156 mph, 209–251 km/h) Category 5 (≥157 mph, ≥252 km/h) Unknown Storm type Tropical cyclone Subtropical cyclone Extratropical cyclone, remnant low, tropical disturbance, or monsoon depression

The origins of Gaston were from a cold front that exited the east coast of the United States on August 22, the same system that also spawned Tropical Storm Hermine. The front left the Carolinas and weakened as it drifted southward, until stalling on August 24. A broad low pressure area developed within the front on August 25 off the southeast coast of the United States. Another area of convection, or thunderstorms, developed along the front near Bermuda, which would become Hermine. As late as August 26, the National Hurricane Center (NHC) dismissed the potential for development. That day however, the western area of thunderstorms became more organized as it developed rainbands. By 12:00 UTC on August 27, the system organized enough to be designated Tropical Depression Seven, located about 130 mi (210 km) east-southeast of Charleston, South Carolina. Upon its formation, the depression was in an area of weak steering currents, resulting in a southwest drift. Situated over warm ocean temperatures, the depression was in an area favorable for further strengthening. Its thunderstorms became more organized, signaling that the system intensified into Tropical Storm Gaston early on August 28.

By early on August 29, Gaston developed an eye feature as it continued to strengthen. Around that time, the storm's track shifted to the northwest and later north. It was steered by a ridge to its northeast and an approaching trough. Gaston continued to strengthen as it approached the coast, and it attained hurricane status around 12:00 UTC on August 29, with maximum sustained winds of 75 mph (120 km/h). About two hours later, Gaston made landfall at Awendaw, South Carolina, between Charleston and McClellanville, as a Category 1 hurricane on the Saffir-Simpson scale. Operationally, the NHC assessed Gaston as a strong tropical storm at landfall, before upgrading it in a post-season analysis based on Doppler radar. The storm rapidly weakened over land as it turned to the northeast, falling to tropical depression status by early on August 30. Around that time, the NHC issued what the agency believed would be the final advisory on Gaston. The agency anticipated that the system would interact with the approaching trough and remain inland over the eastern United States.

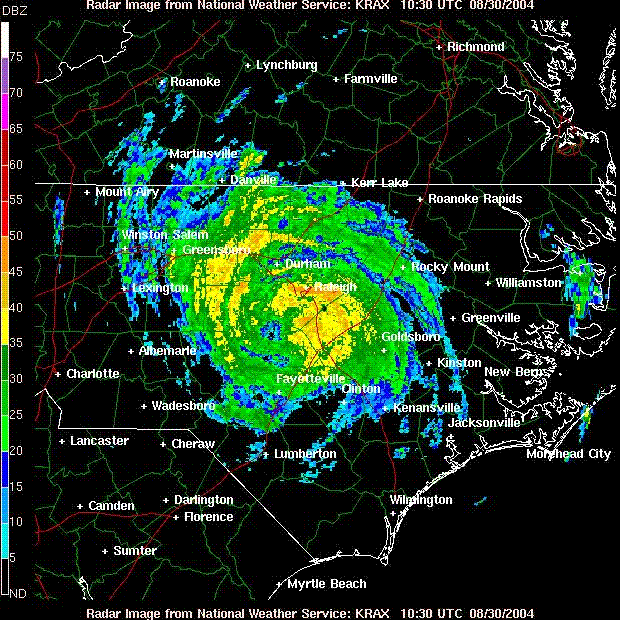
Radar image of Gaston after landfall on August 29

While progressing inland, Gaston increased wind shear over Tropical Storm Hermine, which was moving toward New England. Gaston drew moisture from the coast near Virginia Beach to produce supercell thunderstorms over central Virginia, a sign that the depression was re-intensifying. Around 00:00 UTC on August 31, Gaston regained tropical storm status while the center was over Virginia. Shortly thereafter, the storm crossed the Delmarva Peninsula and emerged back into the Atlantic Ocean. The thunderstorms were limited as Gaston accelerated northeastward and interacted with the frontal system. Late on August 31, the storm passed about 70 mi (110 km) south of Nantucket, Massachusetts. On the next day, Gaston transitioned into an extratropical storm while located south of Nova Scotia. It continued to the northeast, remaining southeast of Atlantic Canada, before reaching the north Atlantic Ocean. The extratropical remnants of Gaston were absorbed by a larger extratropical system on September 3, located south-southeast of Iceland.

== Preparations ==
Soon after Gaston first formed, the NHC began issuing tropical cyclone watches and warnings for the southeast United States coast, beginning with a tropical storm watch between Fernandina Beach, Florida and Surf City, North Carolina to Fernandina Beach, Florida. Initially, the NHC did not anticipate that Gaston would become a hurricane, but after the storm intensified, the agency issued a hurricane warning between the mouth of the Savannah River to Little River Inlet about 14 hours before landfall. A tropical storm warning extended northeastward to Surf City. By August 29, flood watches were in effect for eastern South Carolina and eastern and southern North Carolina. South Carolina officials recommended that residents evacuate from mobile homes, coastal and low-lying areas, and barrier islands. Across the Charleston area, six shelters opened and held more than 100 people during the storm. In Charleston and surrounding areas, bridges were closed to large vehicles and trucks. Historic sites in the Charleston area were closed during the storm.

When Gaston was weakening while moving inland, local National Weather Service offices in Virginia did not anticipate flooding rains, and as a result did not issue flood watches. However, flash flood warnings were issued in advance of the most severe floods. By late on August 30, flood warnings were issued for portions of central Virginia, and tornado watches were put into effect for parts of southeast Virginia and northern North Carolina.

== Impact ==
Across the eastern United States, Hurricane Gaston produced rainfall from South Carolina to parts of New England. Damage throughout the United States was estimated around $130 million. Gaston was the third of five hurricanes to make landfall in the country in 2004.

Hurricane Gaston struck South Carolina two weeks after Hurricane Charley hit the state, marking the first time since the 1959 season that two tropical cyclones struck the state in the same year. There were no official hurricane-force wind observations; however, a storm chaser on Isle of Palms recorded wind gusts of 80 mph (130 km/h). The hurricane also spawned a tornado near Wallace, rated an F1 on the Fujita scale, which was on the ground for about 1 mi (1.6 km). The tornado damaged the roofs and sides of several houses while also wrecking a fence. While moving ashore, the hurricane also produced a 4.5 ft (1.4 m) storm surge at Bulls Bay. The storm caused erosion along Lake Moultrie, with piers and seawalls wrecked at Bonneau Beach. The highest rainfall in the state from Gaston was 10.98 in (279 mm), recorded in Kingstree, where floodwaters reached 5 ft (1.5 m) deep. Gaston's rains added to the rainfall produced by Hurricane Charley, causing road closures and river flooding, with some areas inundated for weeks. The floods forced evacuations in Quinby and northern Berkeley County, while also affecting Darlington and Lake City. The Lumber River crested nearly 8 ft (2.4 m) above flood stage, resulting in record floods along the river. Throughout South Carolina, Gaston left about 172,000 people without power, mostly near Charleston. More than 3,000 buildings sustained damage due to the hurricane, including 8 buildings that were destroyed in Charleston County due to fallen trees and tree limbs. The winds also knocked down signs, fences, and mailboxes, and several cars were damaged by fallen trees. There was $20 million in insured damage in the state.

While crossing North Carolina as a tropical depression, Gaston dropped heavy rainfall, reaching 6.21 in (158 mm) near Jackson Springs. The rains flooded several roads, including portions of Interstate 95, ramps leading to I-40, and street flooding that stranded a few trucks. Wind gusts in North Carolina reached 45 mph (72 km/h) at Carolina Beach. The winds were strong enough to knock down trees, including one that fell onto a home in Clayton, one that hit a post office, and another that fell onto a vehicle in Selma. These winds knocked out power to 6,500 customers. Gaston also spawned several tornadoes in the state, all of them rated F0. The first touched down near Laurinburg, which damaged a roof and shingles. Near Raeford, a tornado damaged four houses along its 1 mi (1.6 km) path. There was a brief twister near Anderson Creek that downed a few trees. There was $15 million in insured damage in the state.

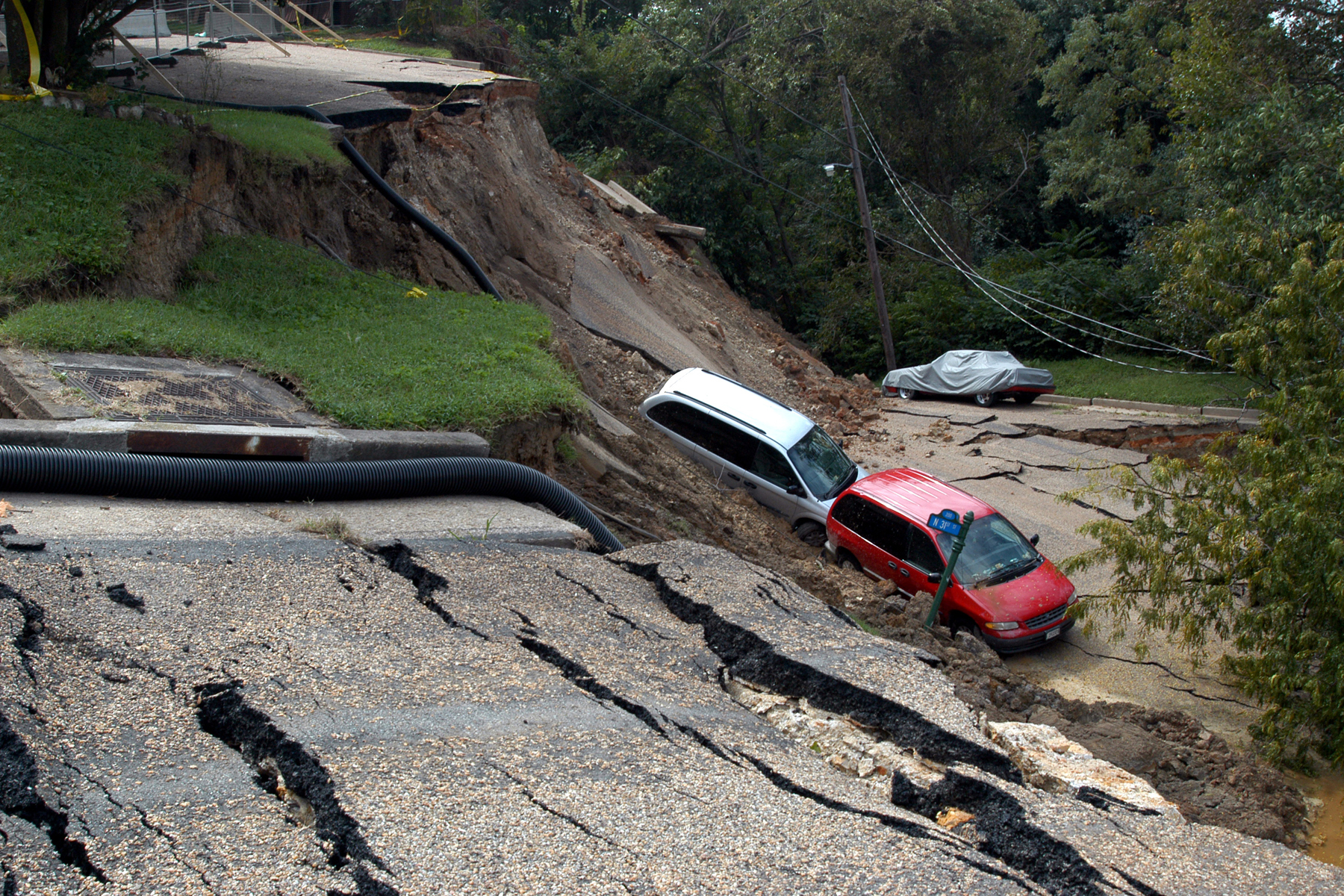
This section of E. Grace Street in Richmond washed out as a result of the heavy rainfall

The heaviest rainfall from Gaston was in Virginia, with a peak of 12.60 in (320 mm) measured in the West End of the state capital, Richmond. Most of the rainfall occurred over an eight-hour period, causing flash flooding across the Greater Richmond Region that contributed to nine fatalities. Five of the deaths were drivers who entered flooded areas, and three people died while attempting to rescue others. Another death was indirectly related to Gaston. The floods damaged or destroyed 580 buildings across the region, with $30 million in insured damage across the state. Richmond's drainage system was unable to handle the high rainfall. In the city's Shockoe Bottom district, floodwaters reached 10 ft (3.0 m) deep. About 20 city blocks in downtown Richmond were condemned due to the floods, including a brick building that was destroyed and dozens of buildings significantly damaged. The floods closed 120 roads across the Richmond area, including parts of I-95 and the Powhite Parkway, while 14 people required rescue from flooded cars or buildings. At least six bridges were washed out across the area. The floods shut down passenger and freight rail traffic through the city along lines belonging to the CSX Corporation. The floods also created a 30 ft (9.1 m) sinkhole, closing an intersection. Waters overtopped a dam along the Falling Creek, forcing hundreds of people to evacuate. Officials opened two shelters to house the evacuees. The floods also triggered several landslides, including one in Church Hill that damaged a house so much, it was condemned. Dominion Energy reported that about 82,000 people lost power in Virginia, mostly nearly Richmond.

Wind gusts in Virginia reached 55 mph (89 km/h) in Kiptopeke State Park while Gaston was restrengthening over the state. The storm also spawned 16 tornadoes in the state, all of them rated an F0. The first was in Dinwiddie County, which lifted and threw a shed. In Hopewell, a tornado damaged the historic Appomattox Manor and a nearby shed. An intermittent 6 mi (9.7 km) tornado hit a hospital in New Kent County, causing minor damage. A twister damaged the roof of a church in Nottoway County. There were two tornadoes in York County, both of which caused roof damage. A tornado hit Richmond, causing minor damage to cars and buildings at the University of Richmond. Two tornadoes touched down in James City, and weak tornadoes also hit Chesterfield, Hanover, New Kent, Prince George, Surry, and York counties, each knocking down a few trees.

Rains in Maryland peaked at 2.57 in (65 mm) in Oakland. Floods entered a post office and covered several roads, including State Route 219. Rainfall in Delaware reached 1.82 in (46 mm) in Greenwood. The rains caused floods along rivers and streams in northern Delaware. The Christina River swelled to a crest of 10.55 ft (3.22 m), slightly above flood stage. Rains in Pennsylvania reached 3.75 in (95 mm) in Sinnemahoning. The rains caused flash flooding along streams and roads in Montgomery County. Two families were displaced by floods in Hollidaysburg and were assisted by the American Red Cross. Several basements were flooded in Wellsboro, and a vehicle had to be rescued. The highest rainfall in New Jersey was 3.94 in (100 mm) in New Lisbon. The rains caused floods of streams in Burlington County. Rains in New York reached 4.71 in (120 mm) in Kingston, where the precipitation created a sinkhole. Several roads and buildings were destroyed in Orange County, prompting states of emergency in Port Jervis and Deer Park. Rainfall in New England peaked at 3.69 in (94 mm) in Chatham.

On August 30, Gaston's heaviest rainfall remained just offshore Nova Scotia, although Sable Island recorded 72 mm (2.8 in) of rainfall in four hours.

== Aftermath ==
The floods in Richmond left behind a layer of silt and debris. On August 31, Virginia Governor Mark Warner declared a state of emergency. Due to Gaston's damaging effects across Virginia, President George W. Bush designated eight counties and four cities as a federal disaster area on September 3. The federal government provided about $30 million to the state, including $9.2 million in individual assistance. In the months following the floods, businesses in Shockoe Bottom began reopening, although it two years to restore everything. Residents created a fundraising drive to help businesses, few of which had flood insurance. The efforts raised more than $350,000, helped partly by a benefit concert held in November 2004 called the Back the Bottom Relief Concert. The Virginia Department of Emergency Management launched a Spanish-language website in 2007, in part because of language barriers during the floods. From 2008–2010, Richmond improved several flood mitigation projects, including three new sewage gates, 100 modified curb inlets, and the purchase and removal of several homes in a floodplain.

On September 15, President Bush also declared three South Carolina counties as disaster areas. The federal government provided about $12.8 million in public assistance.

== See also ==
- List of New Jersey hurricanes
- List of North Carolina hurricanes (2000–present)
- List of South Carolina hurricanes
- Other storms of the same name
- Timeline of the 2004 Atlantic hurricane season
