= Marietta =

Marietta may refer to:

== Places in the United States ==
- Marietta, Jacksonville, Florida
- Marietta, Georgia, the largest US city named Marietta
- Marietta, Illinois
- Marietta, Indiana
- Marietta, Kansas
- Marietta, Minnesota
- Marietta, Mississippi
- Marietta, Missouri, an extinct hamlet in Holt County
- Marietta, Nevada
- Marietta, New York
- Marietta, North Carolina
- Marietta, Ohio
- Marietta, Oklahoma
- Marietta, Adair County, Oklahoma
- Marietta, Pennsylvania
- Marietta, South Carolina
- Marietta, Texas
- Marietta, Wisconsin
- Marietta Township (disambiguation)

== People with the given name ==
- Marietta Alboni (1823–1894), Italian opera singer
- Marietta Blau (1894–1970), Austrian physicist
- Marietta Bones (1842–1901), American suffragist, social reformer, philanthropist
- Marietta Canty (1905–1986), American actress
- Marietta Stanley Case (1845–1900), American author and temperance advocate
- Marietta Chrousala (born 1983), Greek fashion model and television presenter
- Marietta de Patras (died 1503), Greek mistress of King John II of Cyprus
- Marietta de Pourbaix-Lundin (born 1951), Swedish politician
- Marietta DePrima (born 1964), American actress
- Marietta Farrell (born 1951), Irish politician
- Marietta Gazzaniga (1824–1884), Italian operatic soprano
- Marietta Giannakou (born 1951), Greek politician
- Marietta Gillman (born 1955), American canoer
- Marietta Holley (1836–1926), American humorist
- Marietta Johnson (1864–1938), American educational reformer
- Marietta Judah (1812-1883), American stage actress
- Marietta Karamanli (born 1964), French politician
- Marietta Marcolini (c. 1780–1855), Italian operatic contralto
- Marietta Marich (1930–2017), American actress
- Marietta Martin (1902–1944), French writer and Resistance worker
- Marietta Pallis (1882–1963), British botanist
- Marietta Piccolomini (1834–1899), Italian soprano
- Marietta Piekenbrock (born 1964), German artistic curator
- Marietta Sherman Raymond (1862-1949), American violinist, musical educator, orchestral conductor
- Marietta Roberts (1943–2020), Canadian politician
- Marietta Robusti (1560–1590), Venetian painter
- Marietta Sacchi, Italian operatic soprano
- Marietta Shaginyan (1888–1982), Russian writer and public activist
- Marietta Slomka (born 1969), German journalist
- Marietta Stow (1830–1902), American suffragist
- Marietta Peabody Tree (1917–1991), American socialite and political reporter
- Marietta Waters (born 1960), American singer
- Marietta Žigalová (born 1968), Slovak female fitness competitor

== Ships ==
- Marietta-class monitor, U.S. ships during the Civil War
- SS Marietta, a number of ships with this or similar names
- USS Marietta, several ships in the U.S. Navy

== Other uses ==
- 2144 Marietta, a main-belt asteroid, named for Marietta Shaginyan
- Battle of Marietta (1864)
- Marietta, an emo band from Philadelphia
- Marietta biscuit, the name in Ireland for the Marie biscuit
- Marietta City Schools (disambiguation)
- Marietta College, Ohio
- Marietta Confederate Cemetery, Georgia
- Marietta (Glenn Dale, Maryland), a historic home
- Marietta High School (disambiguation)
- Marietta Historic District (disambiguation)
- Marietta Ice Center, Atlanta, Georgia
- Marietta National Cemetery, Georgia
- Marietta Parkway, Marietta, Georgia
- Marietta Square, park and city center in Marietta, Georgia
- Marietta Storm, World Basketball Association franchise based in Marietta, Georgia
- Marietta Subdivision, railroad line owned and operated by CSX Transportation

== See also ==
- Marietta-Alderwood, Washington
- Martin Marietta
- Naughty Marietta (disambiguation)
