= Hurricane Frances =

Category 4 Atlantic hurricane in 2004

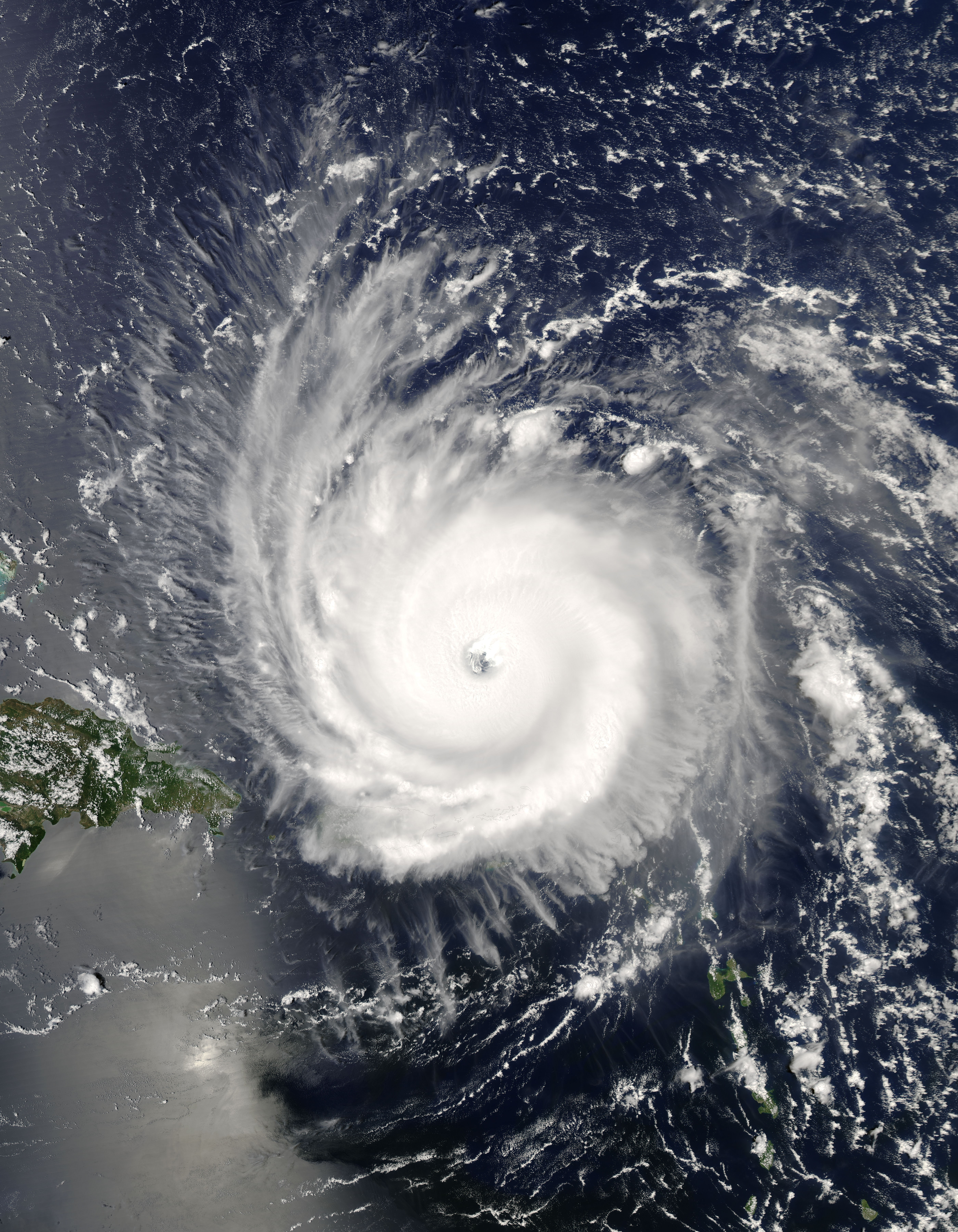
- Hurricane Frances north of Puerto Rico at peak intensity on August 31

Meteorological history
- Formed: August 25, 2004
- Extratropical: September 8, 2004
- Dissipated: September 10, 2004

Category 4 major hurricane
- 1-minute sustained (SSHWS/NWS)
- Highest winds: 145 mph (230 km/h)
- Lowest pressure: 935 mbar (hPa); 27.61 inHg

Overall effects
- Fatalities: 50 total
- Damage: $9.67 billion (2004 USD)
- Areas affected: Antilles (especially The Bahamas); East Coast of the United States (especially Florida); Atlantic Canada
- IBTrACS
- Part of the 2004 Atlantic hurricane season

Hurricane Frances was the second of four Atlantic hurricanes to affect the U.S. state of Florida during the 2004 season. A deadly and destructive tropical cyclone, Frances also struck the Bahamas and other portions of the Southeastern United States. A Cape Verde hurricane, it formed on August 25 from a tropical wave in the tropical Atlantic Ocean. Within 18 hours of developing, the depression strengthened into Tropical Storm Frances, the sixth named storm of the season. By late the next day, Frances attained hurricane status, and it strengthened further to a major hurricane (Note: A major hurricane is a storm that ranks as Category 3 or higher on the Saffir–Simpson scale.) by August 27. On the following day, Frances became a Category 4 hurricane on the Saffir-Simpson scale, attaining maximum sustained winds of 145 mph (230 km/h). At the time, the hurricane was passing about 135 mi (215 km) north of Saint Thomas, U.S. Virgin Islands.

The hurricane slowed and weakened dramatically as it moved across the Bahamas, striking several islands. Wind gusts reached 120 mph (193 km/h) on San Salvador Island. Across the archipelago, Frances left about US$125 million in damage, (Note: All currency totals are in United States dollars and unadjusted for inflation unless specified.) with 6,682 homes damaged to some degree. Two people died in the Bahamas, one related to drowning and the other due to electrocution. Parts of Grand Bahama remained without power by the time Hurricane Jeanne struck the island in late September. The two hurricanes produced more than $550 million in damage and economic losses, equating to about 10% of the country's gross domestic product. On September 27, Bahamian Prime Minister Perry Christie declared a state of emergency.

Ahead of Frances's landfall in Florida, about 2.8 million people were under evacuation orders across 41 counties. It was the state's largest evacuation at the time. On September 5, Frances moved ashore Hutchinson Island in Florida as a Category 2 hurricane. It produced wind gusts of 108 mph (174 km/h) in Fort Pierce. Frances was the second hurricane of the season to hit the state, just three weeks after Hurricane Charley. Statewide damage totaled over $5 billion, with at least 73,000 homes damaged. Across the state, 4.2 million people lost power, with outages as far west as the Florida panhandle. After moving through central Florida, Frances made a second, weaker landfall along the Florida panhandle.

The storm later moved through the southeastern United States, producing one of the United States' largest tornado outbreaks related to a tropical cyclone. With a frontal boundary moving northward ahead of the storm, the plentiful moisture and wind shear produced intense thunderstorms in Frances's rainbands, leading to 103 tornadoes from Florida to Maryland. The strongest was rated F3 on the Fujita scale, which touched down near Camden, South Carolina, destroying several buildings. It was one of 45 tornadoes in the state, setting a new daily tornado record previously held by 1994's Tropical Storm Beryl. Frances also produced widespread rainfall, peaking at 23.57 in (599 mm) on Mount Mitchell in North Carolina. The total included 16.50 in (419 mm) recorded on September 8. The rains caused river flooding and landslides and damaged 11,107 homes in North Carolina. The combination of winds and rains caused widespread power outages and road closures. Across the United States, Frances led to 48 fatalities, of whom six died due to the hurricane's direct impacts. Nationwide damage totaled $9.507 billion, most of it in Florida. Frances transitioned into an extratropical cyclone as it moved across the northeastern United States, producing additional flooding damage across eastern Canada. The remnants of Frances dissipated over the Gulf of St. Lawrence on September 10.

== Meteorological history ==
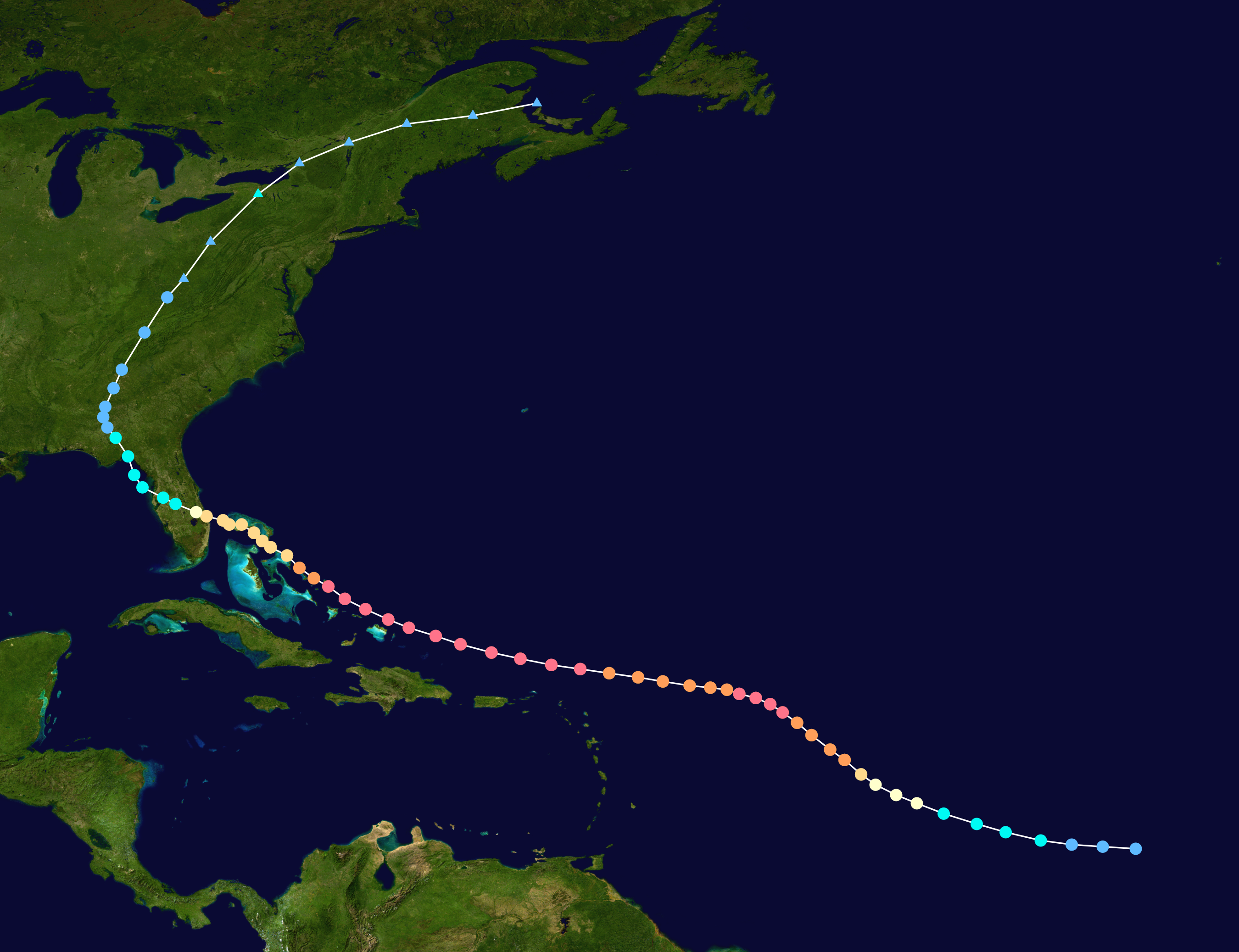
Map plotting the storm's track and intensity, according to the Saffir–Simpson scale Map key Saffir–Simpson scale Tropical depression (≤38 mph, ≤62 km/h) Tropical storm (39–73 mph, 63–118 km/h) Category 1 (74–95 mph, 119–153 km/h) Category 2 (96–110 mph, 154–177 km/h) Category 3 (111–129 mph, 178–208 km/h) Category 4 (130–156 mph, 209–251 km/h) Category 5 (≥157 mph, ≥252 km/h) Unknown Storm type Tropical cyclone Subtropical cyclone Extratropical cyclone, remnant low, tropical disturbance, or monsoon depression

A strong tropical wave moved off the west coast of Africa on August 21. It proceeded westward across the Atlantic Ocean, steered by the Azores High, or a ridge of high pressure, to its north. Over the next few days, the wave's convection, or thunderstorms, became better organized. On August 23, the National Hurricane Center (NHC) first noted the potential for tropical cyclogenesis, or formation, within a day or two. At 00:00 UTC on August 25, (Note: All dates and times are in Coordinated Universal Time (UTC) for consistency.) Tropical Depression Six formed about 755 mi (1,210 km) west-southwest of the Cape Verde islands. With favorable conditions including low wind shear and warm water temperatures, the depression continued to organize as it developed outflow. Late on August 25, the depression strengthened into Tropical Storm Frances, while located approximately 1,420 miles (2,290 km) east of the Lesser Antilles. The next day, an eye feature became apparent. Late on August 26, Frances attained hurricane status, with maximum sustained winds of 75 mph (120 km/h).

On August 27, Frances's track slowed and shifted more to the northwest, as an approaching upper-level trough weakened the ridge to its north. That day, Frances became a major hurricane, or a Category 3 on the Saffir-Simpson scale. It underwent an eyewall replacement cycle, in which a larger eye replaced the original eyewall. Late on August 28, Frances reached its first peak as a Category 4 hurricane with winds of 135 mph (215 km/h). The track shifted back to the west-northwest, and another eyewall replacement cycle began on August 29. This caused a brief period of weakening in conjunction with an increase in wind shear. By August 30, the hurricane's maximum sustained winds fell to 115 mph (185 km/h), but it subsequently began restrengthening. On August 31, Frances reached peak winds of 145 mph (230 km/h) while passing about 135 mi (215 km) north of Saint Thomas in the U.S. Virgin Islands. Additional eyewall cycles again caused weakening, but Frances remained a Category 4 hurricane between August 31 and September 2, during which time it attained a minimum barometric pressure of 935 mbar (27.6 inHg). Meanwhile, the storm slowed its forward speed, gradually arcing northwestward as it wobbled toward the northwestern Bahamas.

On September 2, Frances again reached peak winds of 145 mph (230 km/h). That day, an increase in wind shear caused the hurricane to weaken appreciably. At 19:30 UTC on September 2, Frances started moving through the Bahamas as it hit San Salvador Island with winds of 125 mph (205 km/h). Over the next two days, the hurricane also struck Cat Island, Eleuthera, and Grand Bahama, the last two as a Category 2 hurricane. A building ridge to Frances's west caused the hurricane to meander across the Bahamas, with a large eye about 50 mi (85 km) in diameter. The storm drifted for several hours near Grand Bahama before resuming a west-northwest motion toward Florida's Treasure Coast. At 04:30 UTC on September 5, Frances made landfall in southeastern Florida at the southern end of Hutchinson Island, with winds of about 105 mph (165 km/h).

Frances weakened rapidly while moving across the state, emerging into the Gulf of Mexico on September 6 as a tropical storm. By that time, the storm had a large circulation with little inner core. At 18:00 UTC on September 6, Frances made another landfall on the Florida panhandle near St. Marks with winds of about 60 mph (95 km/h). The storm moved northward and later northeastward, weakening into a tropical depression near the border of Alabama and Georgia. Frances continued through the southeastern United States, producing a prolific tornado outbreak. On September 9, it transitioned into an extratropical cyclone while over West Virginia. The extratropical system briefly re-attained gale-force winds as it moved through New York. The remnants of Frances crossed over southeastern Canada and northern New England, dissipating over the Gulf of St. Lawrence on September 10.

== Preparations ==
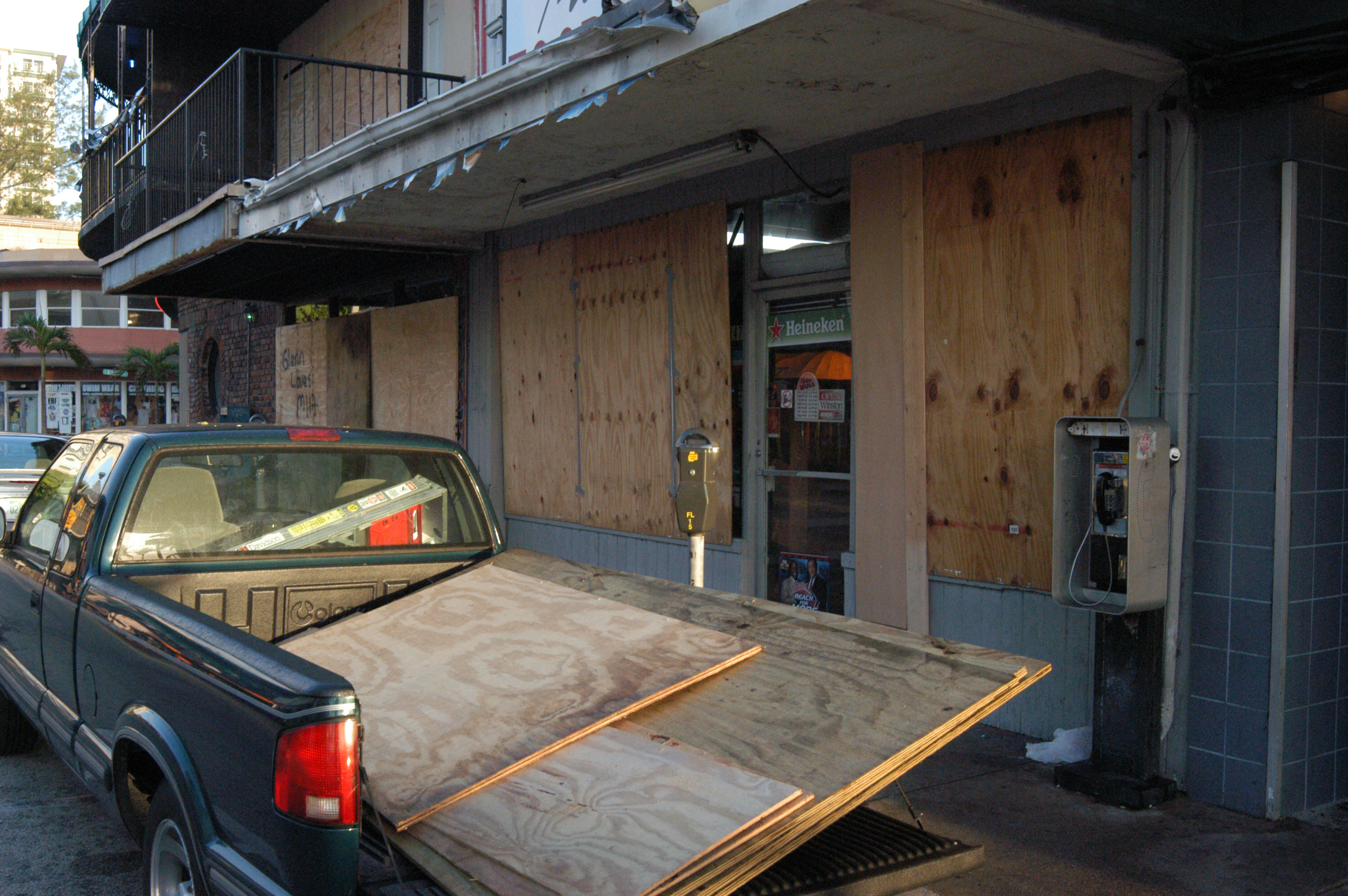
Windows boarded up in Fort Lauderdale, Florida in preparation for Hurricane Frances

The threat from Hurricane Frances prompted widespread tropical cyclone warnings and watches, beginning on August 29. In the Caribbean, tropical storm warnings were issued as far south as Guadeloupe and as far west as the northern coast of the Dominican Republic. Schools and government offices in the United States Virgin Islands closed during the hurricane's passage. Cruise lines were diverted and ferry service was halted between St. Thomas and St. John. In Puerto Rico, schools, courts, and casinos closed, while more than 14 flights were canceled.

The Turks and Caicos Islands and the Bahamas issued hurricane warnings on August 31, ultimately covering the latter country by September 2. In the Turks and Caicos, the local Red Cross provided sandbags and opened emergency shelters. Across the Bahamas, more than 1,500 people stayed in shelters during the hurricane. The country's main radio station, ZNS-1, informed residents where to seek shelter. The Bahamas Electricity Corporation shut off power lines across most of the Bahamas as a precaution; this limited the eventual power restoration time.

While Frances was near peak intensity over the Bahamas, the NHC forecast that it would move ashore in Florida as a major hurricane. On September 2, the NHC issued hurricane warnings for Florida's east coast from Florida City to Flagler Beach, including Lake Okeechobee. Hurricane warnings were later issued for Florida's west coast from Anna Maria Island to Destin. Tropical storm warnings covered the state as far north as Fernandina Beach and the southern portion of the state, including the Florida Keys. Ahead of the hurricane, Governor Jeb Bush declared a state of emergency for the state. Ultimately, about 2.8 million people were under evacuation orders across 41 counties, which was the state's largest evacuation ever. A traffic death occurred during evacuations near Micanopy, Florida, when a man on I-75 hit a tree. About 108,000 people stayed in one of the hundreds of shelters set up in Florida, Alabama, and Georgia. Several airlines canceled flights in and out of the state, and nine cruise lines had their itineraries altered. Both Kennedy Space Center and Walt Disney World closed during the hurricane, the latter for only the fourth time to date. A Major League Baseball series between the Florida Marlins and Chicago Cubs was postponed. Three college football games were also postponed. Based on purchasing patterns from previous disasters, Walmart rerouted supplies to Florida, anticipating the products that would be needed.

Various National Weather Service offices issued flood or flash flood warnings from Florida to Kentucky, and northeastward to New York. After Frances moved inland and weakened, the Storm Prediction Center issued a tornado watch from Georgia to Pennsylvania. Schools across Georgia were closed. Flights were delayed at Dulles International Airport in Virginia due to the storm.

== Impact ==
=== Caribbean ===
Hurricane Frances over the Bahamas on September 3

While Frances passed north of the Lesser Antilles, it produced peak wind gusts of 37 mph (60 km/h), recorded at Cyril E. King Airport on St. Thomas. The hurricane also produced scattered rainfall in the islands. In Puerto Rico, rainfall reached 2.52 in (64 mm) at Carite Lake. Across the island, the hurricane left about 17,000 people without power and 15,000 people without water. Strong waves caused beach erosion and damage to coastal houses in the northern Dominican Republic. The storm destroyed six houses and forced around 50 people to evacuate their houses.

Hurricane Frances also passed about 40 mi (65 km) northeast of the Turks and Caicos Islands. Grand Turk Island recorded wind gusts of 79 mph (127 km/h). The island lost power during the hurricane, and more than a dozen homes sustained damage. A woman was rescued after the roof blew off her residence.

The hurricane took a slow three-day path through the Bahamas, leading to $125 million in damage and two fatalities. One was an electrocution involving a generator in the capital city, Nassau, and the other was a drowning on Grand Bahama amid the hurricane's storm surge, or rise in ocean waters. Floodwaters reached 8 ft (2.4 m) deep on Grand Bahama. On the island of Mayaguana, the storm surge was estimated at 15 ft (4.6 m) deep. Frances also produced strong winds throughout the Bahamas. Shortly after hitting San Salvador, Frances produced wind gusts of 120 mph (193 km/h) on the island. Rainfall on the island totaled 5.47 in (139 mm). The hurricane also produced sustained winds of 100 mph (161 km/h) in North Eleuthera. Across the Bahamas, Frances damaged 6,682 homes to some degree, resulting in $103.5 million in housing damage. This included 671 homes that were destroyed and 1,851 buildings that sustained enough damage to make them temporarily unusable. More than 800 people were forced to leave their houses, and around 300 people required rescue from rooftops by boat or trucks. Several schools sustained damage, estimated at $25 million. The hurricane also caused more than $12 million in infrastructure damage, affecting docks, roads, and seawalls. About 75% of the island chain lost power for a few hours during the storm. Around 1,300 power poles were knocked down or damaged. The Bahamas also sustained about $45 million in damage to the agriculture and fishing industries. All cool-season vegetable plantings, and the entire banana crop, were lost during Frances. The pineapple crop was significantly impacted by wind damage in Eleuthera, while the entire fruit crop was lost for similar reasons. The corn crop in Long Island and Cat Island was completely lost. There were also significant poultry losses.

On Mayaguana, the hurricane damaged roads, power lines, and the roofs of houses. Along the coast, two boats and a dock were damaged. The island of Inagua temporarily lost power service. Crooked Island lost telephone access during the hurricane. Two houses were wrecked on Acklins, and the island's medical clinic had damage to its roof. On Long Island, floodwaters inundated several houses. About 70% of the houses on Rum Cay had damage to shingles. On San Salvador Island, the hurricane destroyed five homes and damaged the roofs of another 60 houses. Also on the island, the hurricane damaged at least 13% of the non-native Australian pine, primarily from snapping or salt spray. On Cat Island, two houses were destroyed, and most of the island's houses had either shingle damage or power outages.

On Eleuthera, strong winds caused structural damage, and Governor's Harbour was flooded. The winds knocked down trees and satellite dishes on New Providence, home to the capital, Nassau, and the Bahamas' most populous island. Princess Margaret Hospital, the country's largest hospital, evacuated patients due to damage. The roof of a church was damaged while being used as a shelter, forcing the evacuees to move. At nearby Cable Beach, a grocery store lost its roof. In the Andros islands and Berry Islands, the hurricane damaged roofs and power lines. Approximately 50% of residences in Coopers Town and North Abaco on the Abaco Islands sustained damage. Several buildings lost parts of their roofs, including a government building. About 20 homes were flooded in Marsh Harbour, along with two buildings at Marsh Harbour Airport. Several people suffered injuries when the roof of a hospital collapsed in South Abaco; patients were evacuated to Nassau by helicopter. Floodwaters inundated the Grand Bahama International Airport 6 ft (1.8 m) deep, washing away parts of the airport and causing $12 million in damage. Strong winds knocked down trees and damaged roofs on the island. The Rand Memorial Hospital on Grand Bahama had to be evacuated when the roof was damaged. Around 3,000 people in West End were left without water and power. After western Grand Bahama flooded, a group including parliament member Obie Wilchcombe helped rescue about 70 people who became trapped in their residences. In the Bimini islands, the hurricane damaged tree limbs.

=== United States ===
Throughout the United States, Hurricane Frances led to 48 fatalities, of whom six died due to the hurricane's direct impacts. Nationwide damage totaled $9.507 billion, making it the nation's eighth costliest hurricane at the time. Frances produced a variety of impacts, including strong winds, heavy rainfall, flooding, rip currents, and a prolific tornado outbreak.

==== Florida ====
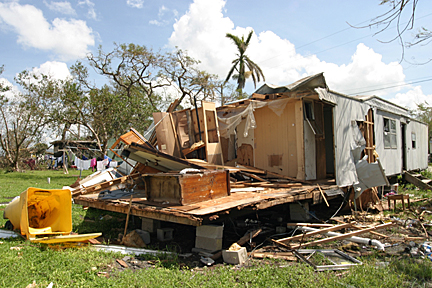
A severely damaged mobile home in Pahokee

Across Florida, Frances led to 37 fatalities. Twelve of the deaths were traffic fatalities, including five due to accidents with downed trees. Four fatalities were due to falling trees or tree limbs, including a power worker responding to outages. There were at least two drowning deaths, and another fatality related to a lightning strike. Two people died after falling from roofs. There were 49 cases of carbon monoxide poisoning in the state, leading to two fatalities. One person died of smoke inhalation after a fire caused by lighting candles during the power outage. One person died while cleaning debris.

Statewide hurricane damage totaled over $5 billion, with at least 73,000 homes damaged to some degree. This included 99 mobile homes that were destroyed or unrepairable. The greatest damage occurred in Indian River, Martin, and St. Lucie counties, with monetary damage of more than $1 billion in each county. The hurricane knocked down trees and power lines, leaving 4,270,583 customers without electricity, some as far west as the Florida panhandle. Strong winds led to a near total loss to citrus groves between Boca Raton and Melbourne, with lesser damage farther to the west across the Kissimmee River basin. Frances damaged areas affected by Hurricane Charley a few weeks earlier, especially in the central portion of the state. Between the two hurricanes, citrus losses totaled $2 billion. On the west coast, high waves damaged a reservoir for a fertilizer company, creating a 50 ft (15 m) gap. Over the course of a day, the reservoir spilled acidic wastewater into Archie Creek Canal and Hillsborough Bay, estimated around 65,000,000 US gal (250,000,000 L). The spill killed thousands of fish, crabs, and other animal species, while also causing some degree of die-off to 78.4 acres (31.7 ha) of mangroves and 57.3 acres (23.2 ha) of marshlands.

While making landfall, Frances produced hurricane-force winds across much of southeastern Florida. Although power outages disrupted many anemometers, the highest wind gust in the state was 108 mph (174 km/h), recorded in Fort Pierce. Port Mayaca along the east coast of Lake Okeechobee recorded sustained winds of 85 mph (137 km/h), which was the highest sustained wind in the state. Frances also produced tropical storm force winds across southern Florida. Prior to Frances weakening to a tropical storm, hurricane-force winds in Florida extended up to a width of 145 mi (235 km) from the cyclone's center. Frances also produced heavy rains in the state, peaking at 16.61 in (422 mm) in Kent Grove, near Spring Hill. Large portions of west-central and northeast Florida reported precipitation amounts of at least 10 in (250 mm). West Palm Beach recorded 13.5 in (344 mm), most of which fell before the hurricane's arrival and up to an hour after landfall. Significant storm surge impacted both coasts, estimated as high as 8 ft (2.4 m). The highest recorded storm surge was 5.89 ft (1.80 m) above mean sea level recorded at the St. Lucie Lock. The hurricane produced severe beach erosion along the Atlantic coast from Vero Beach to Cocoa Beach, including along inland riverways. The erosion affected coastal areas as far north as Daytona Beach, washing away 12 ft (3.7 m) of dunes in some areas.

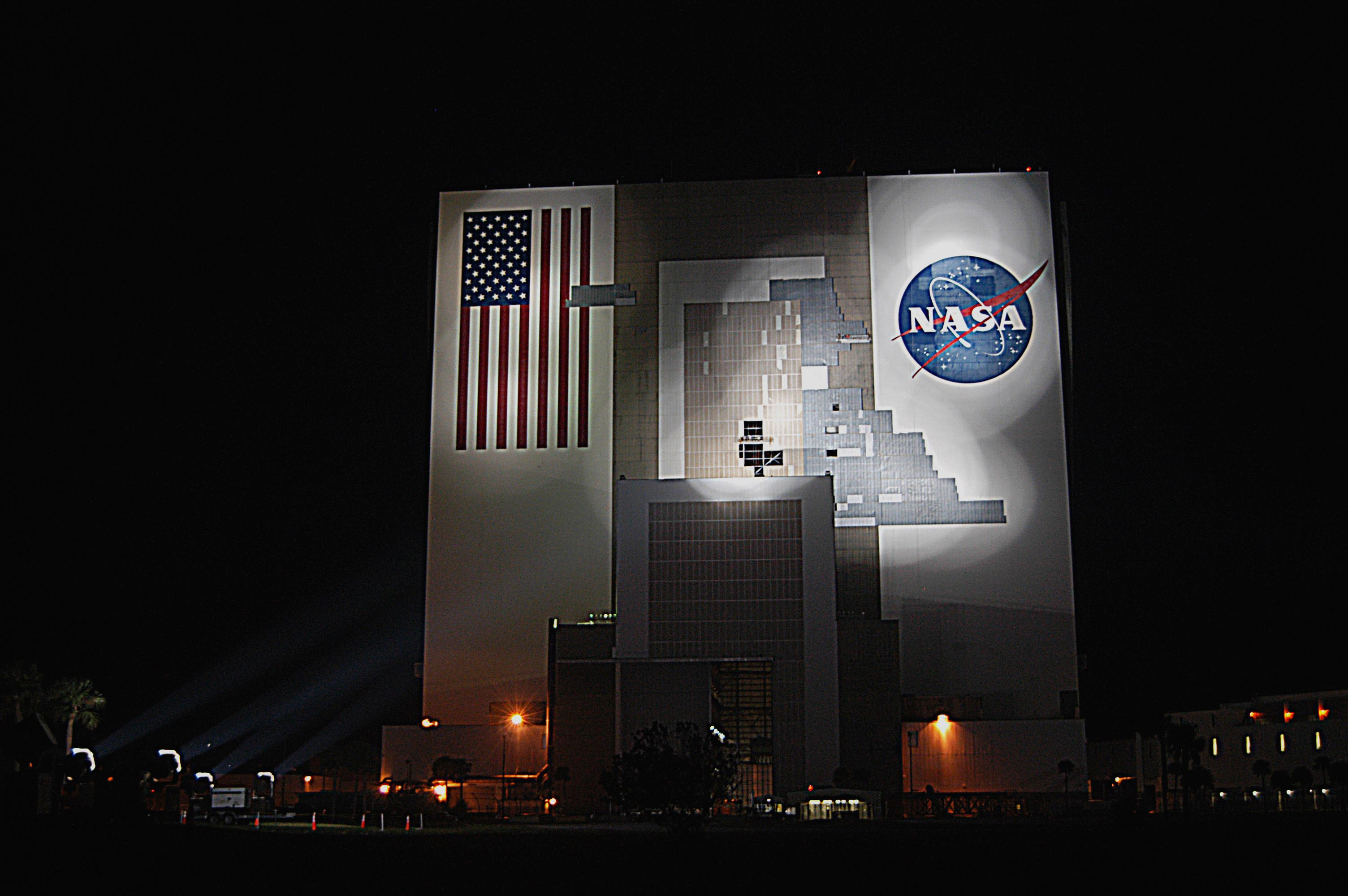
Workers repairing the Vehicle Assembly Building at Kennedy Space Center

Along the Atlantic coast, Frances's waves damaged a beach road, piers, boats, marinas, and seawalls. The hurricane's waves also caused shoaling along inlets, which reduced boat navigation. Port Canaveral was closed for a week as a result. Near the immediate coast, the hurricane damaged 546 buildings. In the city of Cape Canaveral, the waves destroyed two lifeguard stands and damaged beach walkways. A bridge carrying State Highway A1A was washed away and destroyed on Hutchinson Island. In Fort Pierce, the hurricane destroyed the municipal marina, as well as several hangars at the Treasure Coast International Airport. Golf courses along the Treasure Coast generally lost 300–500 trees per course. Across Martin County, 1,129 dwellings became uninhabitable, with at least 52 homes destroyed. Roughly half of the businesses in Indian River County were damaged. Frances caused about $100 million in damage to space and military facilities around Cape Canaveral. The storm ripped off 820 4-by-10-foot (1.2 by 3.0 m) aluminum panels covering the large Vehicle Assembly Building at the Kennedy Space Center. Two external fuel tanks for the Space Shuttle were in the building but seemed undamaged. The Space Shuttle Discovery's hangar was without power.

In South Florida, heavy rains caused a large sinkhole to develop on Interstate 95 in Palm Beach County, closing the highway to traffic. Minor wind and sign damage occurred as far south as Marathon. On Florida's west coast, a storm surge of 5 ft (1.5 m) flooded downtown Punta Gorda. Frances's winds also blew the tarps off the roofs of buildings previously damaged by Charley. Above-normal tides also produced flooding in St. Petersburg. Heavy rainfall caused major street flooding in Kissimmee and St. Cloud, while water entered some workplaces and residences. Rivers and streams across northern Florida swelled past their flood stage, which washed out roads and covered portions of I-10. In Hillsborough County, the Hillsborough River swelled to a record 34.38 ft (10.48 m) flood stage. Several other rivers rose to their highest levels since Hurricane Donna in 1960.

==== Elsewhere in the United States ====
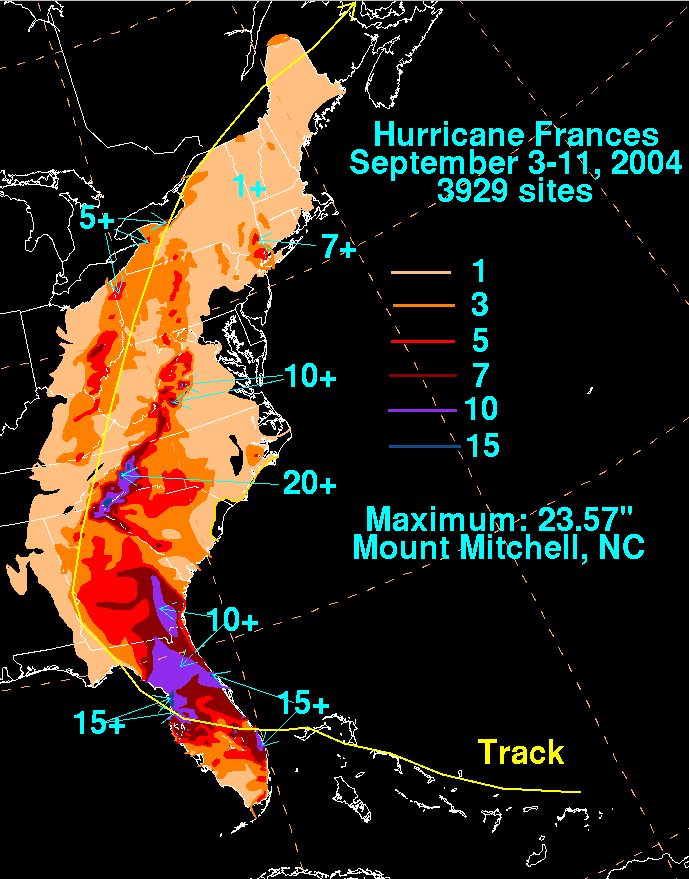
Storm total Rainfall from Frances

As Frances moved inland during its final landfall, it produced wind gusts of 52 mph (83 km/h) in Dothan, Alabama. The winds were strong enough to knock down trees, one of which injured a motorist in Elmore County. Rainfall in the state peaked at 3.2 in (81 mm) in Bleecker. There was one indirect fatality related to Frances in Alabama. In neighboring Georgia, the highest recorded rainfall was 12.82 in (326 mm), recorded in Patterson. There were eight indirect deaths across Georgia, including five related to traffic accidents. Over 500,000 people statewide lost electricity during Frances's passage. Hundreds of homes were damaged by floodwaters in Grady and Thomas counties, with five mobile homes destroyed. Across southeastern Georgia, the heavy rains led to floods, with rivers in the region exceeding flood stage. The floodwaters washed out or inundated dirt and county roads, while also entering homes. Frances produced wind gusts as strong as 68 mph (109 km/h) in Albany. The winds knocked down trees and power lines, some of which damaged homes. Two people were injured in Wayne County due to a fallen tree onto their mobile home. The heavy rains knocked down about one-third of the state's pecans and damaged about 200,000 bales of cotton. Along the coast, the hurricane produced tides 1 to 2 ft (0.30 to 0.61 m) above normal, causing beach erosion and flooding a portion of the F.J. Torras Causeway. In neighboring South Carolina, wind gusts reached 58 mph (93 km/h), strong enough to knock down trees. The heaviest rainfall statewide was at Caesars Head in the northernmost portion of the state. The rains caused flash flooding, causing rivers and streams to rise. The floods washed away two bridges in the city of Union, while also forcing residents to evacuate in Berea.

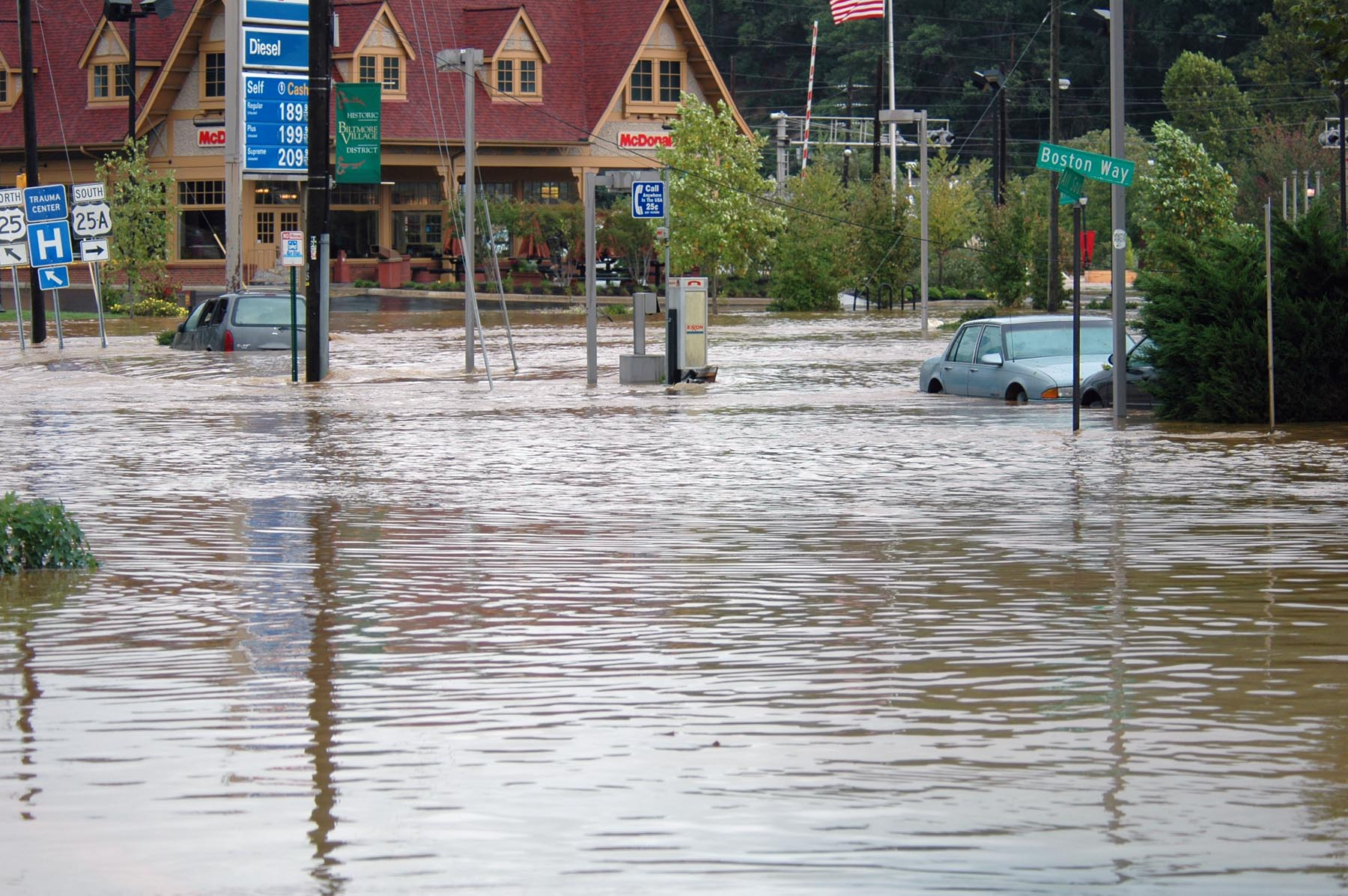
Flooding outside Biltmore Estate in Asheville after Hurricane Frances

The heaviest rainfall from Frances in the United States was 23.57 in (599 mm) on Mount Mitchell in North Carolina, including 16.50 in (419 mm) recorded on September 8. Frances damaged 11,107 homes across the state, with another 62 houses destroyed. The heavy rainfall flooded rivers across mountainous areas, including the Little Tennessee, Pigeon, Swannanoa, and French Broad rivers. The French Broad River swelled to reach 25 ft (7.6 m) in Blantyre. In Buncombe County, flood damage reached $40 million, with the heaviest damage near the Biltmore Village in Asheville, in Black Mountain, and in Swannanoa. Statewide, more than 200 people were rescued from the floods. Flood damage left Asheville without drinking water for a few days, and 4,000 people lost telephone service. Hundreds of buildings were damaged or destroyed in Tranysylvania County, while people were forced to evacuate. The heaviest damage was in the towns of Clyde and Canton. The floods also washed out roads and bridges in the area. Several dams were damaged in Macon County. In Jackson County, dams opened their floodgates, triggering evacuations. Floods from the Little River swept away a home in Burke County, and a mudslide destroyed a home in Watauga County. More than 250 people in Yancey County were isolated after floods and landslides damaged bridges. The floods triggered landslides that closed portions of the Blue Ridge Parkway and I-40, while washing away parts of North Carolina Highway 281. Over 100,000 trout were lost due to floods across four fish hatcheries. The combination of rain and wind gusts over 50 mph (80 km/h) knocked down trees and power lines across the state. A tree fell onto a house in Fayetteville. Crop damage in the state reached more than $54 million.

Heavy rainfall extended farther inland. In Tennessee, the highest precipitation was 5.36 in (136 mm), recorded in Trade in the state's easternmost region. In neighboring Kentucky, rainfall reached 5.50 in (140 mm) near Middlesboro, causing floods in the city. Parts of Olive Hill had to be evacuated due to floods. Floods or mudslides closed several roads across the state, including state routes 7, 15, 191, 711, and 1010. The flooded roads forced schools in Powell County to close. In West Virginia, rains reached 6.02 in (153 mm) in Berkeley Springs. The rains led to floods along streams and in low-lying areas, including in Huntington. Several roads were closed due to floods, and one was closed due to a landslide. In Ohio, rainfall peaked at 7.85 in (199 mm) in Mount Ephraim. Flooding in Newcomerstown swept away and killed a girl. There was another death indirectly related to Frances in the state. Streams and creeks flooded across southeastern Ohio, closing several roads, and a mudslide closed a portion of Route 258. Across the state, the floods damaged at least 671 homes, including five that were destroyed, forcing hundreds of people to evacuate. In the village of Minerva, dozens of people had to be rescued, and the sewage treatment was damaged. The city of Roseville declared a state of emergency due to floods. Frances also produced gale-force winds across parts of Ohio, which knocked down hundreds of trees, with six homes and a vehicle damaged by falling trees. High winds and waves destroyed a pier in Lake County. Rainfall reached as far west as Indiana, reaching 0.35 in (8.9 mm) in Marshall, and as far north as Michigan, reaching 0.82 in (21 mm) at Selfridge Air National Guard Base.

In Virginia, rainfall from Frances reached 10.48 in (266 mm) at Upper Serando. The rains generated flash flooding in portions of southwest Virginia, forcing the evacuation of a school, a trailer park, and five homes. The rains closed roads and led to several car accidents. The city of Roanoke was flooded after the Roanoke River swelled past flood stage. Thunderstorms knocked down trees. Frostburg, Maryland, recorded 6.26 in (159 mm) of precipitation, the state's highest during Frances. In western Maryland, floodwaters washed away roads and inundated bridges after creeks and streams overflowed. In Washington County, a landslide covered a portion of Maryland Route 144. Schools were closed due to the floods, and around 20 basements were affected by flooding. Rainfall was light in Delaware, with a peak of 0.29 in (7.4 mm) recorded in Wilmington. The coast of Delaware and New Jersey experienced rip currents due to Frances's interaction with a high pressure system. Several swimmers had to be rescued. Rainfall in New Jersey reached 5.25 in (133 mm) in Trenton. The rains caused flash flooding in the northeastern portion of the state, which inundated several roads. The Harrison train station was flooded 5 ft (1.5 m), and several passengers required rescue. A road overpass in Weehawken collapsed due to the floods.

Rains in Pennsylvania reached 6.13 in (156 mm) near Meadville. The rains flooded rivers across northwestern Pennsylvania, which damaged at least 1,500 houses and forced hundreds of people to evacuate. At least eight people required rescue from their vehicles. In Edinboro, floodwaters overflowed a dam on Edinboro Lake, forcing the evacuation of residents as well as students at a local university. Floods or landslides damaged 20 roads, including two bridges in Erie County that were destroyed, and a railroad bridge in Blair County that was damaged. Floodwaters reached 4 ft (1.2 m) deep on parts of I-90. Flooding was also reported in Pittsburgh. Minor flooding occurred along the banks of the three rivers, with additional damage reported in river tributaries. Wind gusts reached 47 mph (76 km/h) at the Erie International Airport. The winds were strong enough to knock down trees, and a few homes sustained minor damage. The highest precipitation in New York was 7.05 in (179 mm), recorded in Platte Clove. The rains caused floods across central and western New York, and a swollen stream killed a child in Wyoming County. Several roads were closed after rivers exceeded their banks. Flash flooding also affected the New York metropolitan area, closing major highways across the city, and shutting down parts of the New York City Subway. Several people required rescue from their homes or cars. In Cold Spring, the floods washed away parts of a road. In Steuben County, several bridges were washed away, resulting in school closures and a state of emergency. Rainfall in Connecticut reached 3.90 in (99 mm) in Colebrook, causing flash floods and inundating roads. Precipitation from Frances extended across New England, peaking at 4.16 in (106 mm) atop Mount Washington.

==== Tornado outbreak ====
Frances produced one of the largest tornado outbreaks ever spawned by a tropical cyclone in the United States, with 103 tornadoes confirmed from Florida to Virginia between September 4–8. The outbreak was only surpassed by Hurricane Beulah in 1967 with 115 tornadoes, while Hurricane Ivan in 2004 produced 127 tornadoes. An attendant frontal boundary, positioned offshore on September 5, lifted northward across the region over subsequent days. Moderate convective available potential energy, plentiful moisture, and strong low-level wind shear culminated in the development of several long-lived supercell thunderstorms and tornadoes within the outer rainbands of Frances, mostly northeast of the center. Frances spawned 45 tornadoes across South Carolina, setting a new daily record in the state previously held by 1994's Tropical Storm Beryl.

Confirmed tornadoes by Fujita rating
FU	F0	F1	F2	F3	F4	F5	Total
0	71	26	5	1	0	0	103

===== September 4 event =====
List of confirmed tornadoes – Saturday, September 4, 2004
F#	Location	County / Parish	State	Start Coord.	Time (UTC)	Path length	Max width
F0	E of St. Cloud	Osceola	FL	28.25°N 81.2333°W	15:04	0.1 mi (0.16 km)	20 yd (18 m)
F0	A brief tornado pushed a police car off of US 192.						
F0	Kathleen area	Polk	FL	28.1167°N 81.9833°W	02:08–02:13	3.6 mi (5.8 km)	50 yd (46 m)
F0	A tornado was reported.						

===== September 5 event =====
List of confirmed tornadoes – Sunday, September 5, 2004
F#	Location	County / Parish	State	Start Coord.	Time (UTC)	Path length	Max width
F0	Fruit Cove area	St. Johns	FL	30.1°N 81.55°W	09:05–?	5 mi (8.0 km)	0.2 yd (0.18 m)
F0	A tornado caused minor damage.						
F0	Citra area	Marion	FL	29.4167°N 82.1167°W	10:05–?	1 mi (1.6 km)	0.2 yd (0.18 m)
F0	Some minor roof damage occurred.						
F0	Orange Park	Clay	FL	30.1667°N 81.7°W	12:10	1 mi (1.6 km)	0.2 yd (0.18 m)
F0	A tornado was observed by a trained spotter as it caused widespread tree damage throughout Orange Park.						
F0	Northern Palm Coast	Flagler	FL	29.55°N 81.2167°W	13:20	0.5 mi (0.80 km)	0.2 yd (0.18 m)
F0	Minor damage occurred to homes.						
F0	Flagler Estates area	St. Johns	FL	29.65°N 81.3667°W	13:25–?	3 mi (4.8 km)	0.2 yd (0.18 m)
F0	A weak tornado caused damage to homes along SR 13.						
F0	N of Wellborn	Suwannee	FL	30.2333°N 82.8167°W	18:30	0.5 mi (0.80 km)	0.2 yd (0.18 m)
F0	An NWS employee reported a tornado. Trees were snapped on either side of I-10.						
F0	Crescent City	Putnam	FL	29.4333°N 81.5167°W	19:13	0.5 mi (0.80 km)	0.2 yd (0.18 m)
F0	A tornado caused tree and property damage in Crescent City.						
F0	E of Morven	Lowndes	GA	30.95°N 83.4333°W	20:15	0.2 mi (0.32 km)	50 yd (46 m)
F0	Several trees were uprooted, one of which was hurled into a garage.						
F0	W of Palatka to Interlachen area	Putnam	FL	29.65°N 81.7°W	22:30–22:50	10 mi (16 km)	0.2 yd (0.18 m)
F0	This tornado tossed a trampoline and was reported by local emergency management.						
F0	N of High Springs	Putnam	FL	29.8333°N 82.6°W	23:00–?	5 mi (8.0 km)	0.2 yd (0.18 m)
F0	A tornado downed and snapped trees just outside of High Springs.						
F0	Darien	McIntosh	GA	31.3667°N 81.4333°W	00:30–00:35	0.3 mi (0.48 km)	50 yd (46 m)
F0	This tornado ripped a porch off of a home and downed trees and powerlines along SR 99.						

===== September 6 event =====
List of confirmed tornadoes – Monday, September 6, 2004
F#	Location	County / Parish	State	Start Coord.	Time (UTC)	Path length	Max width
F0	NNE of Riceboro	Liberty	GA	31.75°N 81.4167°W	04:05–04:10	0.5 mi (0.80 km)	40 yd (37 m)
F0	A roof was damaged and trees and large tree limbs were downed.						
F0	Southern Fruit Cove	Putnam	FL	30.0833°N 81.45°W	06:15	1 mi (1.6 km)	0.2 yd (0.18 m)
F0	Multiple homes were damaged.						
F0	SW of Richmond Hill	Bryan	GA	31.8833°N 81.3667°W	07:30–07:35	0.5 mi (0.80 km)	30 yd (27 m)
F0	Trees and powerlines were downed by a weak tornado.						
F0	S of Register to SE of Metter	Bulloch, Candler	GA	32.3167°N 81.8833°W	08:20–08:35	5 mi (8.0 km)	60 yd (55 m)
F0	A tornado knocked down multiple trees.						
F1	N of Midway to NNE of Flemington	Liberty, Bryan	GA	31.8667°N 81.4333°W	13:00–13:15	8.5 mi (13.7 km)	75 yd (69 m)
F1	This tornado downed and snapped numerous trees.						
F0	SW of Bartow	Polk	FL	27.85°N 81.8667°W	14:32	0.3 mi (0.48 km)	30 yd (27 m)
F0	A brief tornado was reported.						
F1	E of Thunderbolt, GA to N of Savannah, GA	Chatham (GA), Jasper (SC)	GA, SC	32.0333°N 80.9833°W	15:02–15:20	6 mi (9.7 km)	300 yd (270 m)
F1	A fence was destroyed and trees and powerlines were downed before dissipating over marshlands.						
F0	WNW of Jacksonboro	Colleton	SC	32.8°N 80.5°W	17:05–17:10	0.5 mi (0.80 km)	40 yd (37 m)
F0	Trees were knocked down.						
F1	Hilton Head Island	Beaufort	SC	32.2167°N 80.75°W	18:40–18:45	1 mi (1.6 km)	75 yd (69 m)
F1	A tornado destroyed a picket fence and launched through a door into a home. The roof of the same home was partially lifted, causing interior damage within the home, before settling back down.						
F1	SSE of Hardeeville	Jasper	SC	32.25°N 81.0333°W	18:55–19:05	2 mi (3.2 km)	100 yd (91 m)
F1	This tornado downed trees and tree limbs, one of which fell onto a mobile home, injuring an occupant.						
F0	Northern Palm Beach Gardens	Palm Beach	FL	26.9333°N 80.1°W	20:40	0.2 mi (0.32 km)	10 yd (9.1 m)
F0	A brief tornado touched down near I-95.						
F1	N of Green Cove Springs to southern Fleming Island	Clay	FL	30°N 81.6833°W	22:45–?	0.5 mi (0.80 km)	0.2 yd (0.18 m)
F1	This tornado began as a waterspout over the St. Johns River and struck a boat housing area. Seven motorboats, six sailboats and a houseboat were all destroyed. A 32 ft (9.8 m) boat was tossed on top of the houseboat on the other side of the pier. The waterspout then crossed Black Creek and made landfall, damaging trees west of US 17 before dissipating.						
F0	SSE of Fruit Cove (1st tornado)	St. Johns	FL	30.1°N 81.6333°W	23:10–?	1 mi (1.6 km)	0.2 yd (0.18 m)
F0	A weak tornado caused minor damage along a county road.						
F0	SSE of Fruit Cove (2nd tornado)	St. Johns	FL	30.1°N 81.6333°W	23:20	1 mi (1.6 km)	0.2 yd (0.18 m)
F0	Minor damage occurred near Shands Bridge.						
F0	SSW of Aripeka	Pasco	FL	28.4°N 82.6833°W	02:00	0.2 mi (0.32 km)	30 yd (27 m)
F0	Several trees were downed, including a large tree that blocked a road.						

===== September 7 event =====
List of confirmed tornadoes – Tuesday, September 7, 2004
F#	Location	County / Parish	State	Start Coord.	Time (UTC)	Path length	Max width
F0	NE of St. Matthews	Calhoun	SC	33.7333°N 80.7°W	07:20–07:23	0.5 mi (0.80 km)	100 yd (91 m)
F0	Trees were downed across US 601.						
F0	NE of Hardeeville	Jasper	SC	32.33°N 81.0167°W	07:30–07:35	0.5 mi (0.80 km)	50 yd (46 m)
F0	A weak tornado snapped or uprooted trees.						
F0	NW of Ridgeville	Dorchester	SC	33.13°N 80.35°W	07:55–08:00	0.5 mi (0.80 km)	40 yd (37 m)
F0	Trees and tree limbs were downed.						
F2	Gadsden area	Richland	SC	33.8333°N 80.75°W	08:46–08:48	2.5 mi (4.0 km)	440 yd (400 m)
F2	This strong tornado completely destroyed three mobile homes and damaged several others. A couple of businesses were also heavily damaged. Numerous trees and powerlines were downed. Three people were injured.						
F0	NW of Allendale	Allendale	SC	33.02°N 81.3167°W	09:20–09:28	2 mi (3.2 km)	40 yd (37 m)
F0	A weak tornado downed and snapped numerous trees.						
F1	Eastern Columbia	Richland	SC	34.0167°N 80.9333°W	09:25–09:28	1 mi (1.6 km)	200 yd (180 m)
F1	Approximately twenty-two homes suffered light to moderate damage within Fort Jackson.						
F0	SW of Kline	Allendale	SC	33.0667°N 81.3667°W	09:40–09:45	1 mi (1.6 km)	40 yd (37 m)
F0	Several trees were downed or snapped.						
F0	Gadsden area	Richland	SC	33.98°N 81°W	10:17–10:18	0.5 mi (0.80 km)	100 yd (91 m)
F0	A few trees were uprooted onto roadways.						
F0	Barnwell	Barnwell	SC	33.2333°N 81.3667°W	10:35–10:36	0.5 mi (0.80 km)	100 yd (91 m)
F0	Signs were damaged and some trees and powerlines were downed within Barnwell.						
F0	SSE of Monetta	Aiken	SC	33.8°N 81.55°W	11:14–11:15	0.5 mi (0.80 km)	100 yd (91 m)
F0	This weak tornado downed trees across SC 391 and SC 39.						
F2	Southwestern Sumter	Sumter	SC	33.8833°N 80.3833°W	11:28–11:38	4 mi (6.4 km)	500 yd (460 m)
F2	A strong tornado moved through southwestern portions of Sumter, destroying nine homes will damaging an additional fifty-five. Three injuries were reported.						
F1	Gillisonville area	Jasper	SC	32.6°N 80.9667°W	11:35–11:45	4 mi (6.4 km)	75 yd (69 m)
F1	Hundreds of trees were snapped, some of which were thrown in varying directions.						
F1	S of Manville	Lee	SC	34.1°N 80.3°W	12:40–12:48	4 mi (6.4 km)	440 yd (400 m)
F1	Large trees and powerlines were downed, multiple homes were moderately damaged and a cotton gin mill was also damaged.						
F0	SSW of Bishopville	Lee	SC	34.2°N 80.2667°W	13:10–13:12	0.5 mi (0.80 km)	100 yd (91 m)
F0	A storm chaser observed a tornado that did minor damage to a mobile home and downed a few trees and powerlines.						
F0	Antioch area	Kershaw	SC	34.2167°N 80.5167°W	13:18–13:24	3 mi (4.8 km)	400 yd (370 m)
F0	A weak, intermittent tornado did minor damage to mobile homes and trees.						
F1	Cassatt area	Kershaw	SC	34.35°N 80.4167°W	13:35–13:45	5 mi (8.0 km)	440 yd (400 m)
F1	This tornado damaged several homes and manufactured homes. A turkey farm also sustained some damage.						
F0	Holly Hill area	Orangeburg	SC	33.6°N 80.85°W	13:48–13:49	0.5 mi (0.80 km)	100 yd (91 m)
F0	A few trees and powerlines were downed along SC 453.						
F0	SW of Paxville	Clarendon	SC	33.7167°N 80.3667°W	13:48–13:49	0.5 mi (0.80 km)	100 yd (91 m)
F0	This weak tornado snapped or uprooted trees.						
F0	Liberty Triangle area	Marion	FL	29.0667°N 81.9667°W	14:00	0.5 mi (0.80 km)	0.2 yd (0.18 m)
F0	A trained spotter reported a tornado near a golf course. No damage was reported either.						
F1	N of Cherryvale	Sumter	SC	33.97°N 80.4833°W	14:03–14:09	3 mi (4.8 km)	400 yd (370 m)
F1	A tornado touched down within Shaw Air Force Base and inflicted mainly light damage to homes with a few moderate pockets of damage. Many trees and powerlines were also downed in the area.						
F1	E of Elgin	Lancaster	SC	34.67°N 80.65°W	14:40–14:44	2 mi (3.2 km)	300 yd (270 m)
F1	A turkey farm was significantly damaged. Several other homes and mobile homes also suffered damage as well.						
F0	Interlachen	Putnam	FL	29.6167°N 81.9°W	14:45	0.5 mi (0.80 km)	0.2 yd (0.18 m)
F0	Tree damage was reported in Interlachen.						
F3	NE of Camden	Kershaw	SC	34.2667°N 80.5833°W	15:15–15:29	7 mi (11 km)	880 yd (800 m)
F3	An intense tornado caused major damage at a horse farm where a cinder block horse stable was severely damaged and a large horse trailer was lofted and tossed on top of the stable. Several outbuildings and mobile homes were completely demolished and numerous powerlines and trees were downed. One person was injured.						
F2	Northeastern Tega Cay, SC to southwestern Charlotte, NC	York (SC), Mecklenburg (NC)	SC, NC	35.0333°N 81.0333°W	15:43–15:48	3 mi (4.8 km)	200 yd (180 m)
F2	This strong tornado began on the northeast side of Tega Cay and moved due north, snapping or uprooting several trees, a few of which fell onto homes and vehicles, damaging them. The tornado then crossed into North Carolina and entered the extreme southwestern areas of Charlotte, inflicting significant damage. A well-constructed home had its roof entirely ripped off and numerous other homes suffered shingle damage. A garage had a sheet of drywall torn off of it and was blown away. Several other homes and vehicles also were damaged due to more fallen trees.						
F0	Nocatee area	St. Johns	FL	30.0833°N 81.45°W	16:00	0.5 mi (0.80 km)	0.2 yd (0.18 m)
F0	Some shingles were blown off a roof.						
F0	SW of Darlington	Darlington	SC	34.2833°N 79.8833°W	16:35–16:45	1.3 mi (2.1 km)	50 yd (46 m)
F0	Several trees were snapped, some of which fell onto and damaged the roofs of multiple homes.						
F1	SSE of Cheraw	Chesterfield	SC	34.5833°N 79.8333°W	16:40–16:56	8 mi (13 km)	440 yd (400 m)
F1	This intermittent tornado inflicted minor damage to homes, businesses and an elementary school. Powerlines and trees were downed as well.						
F0	SE of Cope	Orangeburg	SC	33.33°N 80.9333°W	16:45–16:46	0.5 mi (0.80 km)	100 yd (91 m)
F0	A few trees were downed.						
F0	SSE of Society Hill	Darlington	SC	34.5°N 79.85°W	17:10–17:15	0.7 mi (1.1 km)	50 yd (46 m)
F0	A home had its roof damaged and several trees were snapped.						
F0	Northeastern Jacksonville	Duval	FL	30.3333°N 81.6°W	17:35	1 mi (1.6 km)	1 yd (0.91 m)
F0	Four trees were downed including one that fell onto a home and another that fell onto a vehicle.						
F1	ESE of Cerro Gordo to Evergreen to E of Proctorville	Columbus, Robeson	NC	34.3°N 78.8833°W	17:38–18:17	10 mi (16 km)	40 yd (37 m)
F1	A tornado moved through Evergreen and Boardman, destroying three buildings, damaging four other buildings, and snapping or uprooted numerous trees.						
F0	W of St. Augustine	St. Johns	FL	29.88°N 81.35°W	17:40	0.5 mi (0.80 km)	0.2 yd (0.18 m)
F0	A weak tornado damaged a few homes near the I-95/SR 16 interchange.						
F1	Clio area	Marlboro	SC	34.5333°N 79.5°W	18:05–18:12	5 mi (8.0 km)	100 yd (91 m)
F1	Numerous trees were snapped and/or uprooted and several homes were damaged.						
F1	NE of Morven	Anson	NC	34.8833°N 79.9833°W	18:24–18:30	2 mi (3.2 km)	75 yd (69 m)
F1	A tornado touched down along NC 145 and blew down trees and powerlines along the road. It then impacted a turkey farm where two barns were destroyed, killing thousands of turkeys. The tornado lifted shortly afterwards.						
F1	SW of McColl	Marlboro	SC	34.65°N 79.55°W	18:27–18:30	0.3 mi (0.48 km)	25 yd (23 m)
F1	A mobile home was destroyed.						
F0	Lumberton area	Robeson	NC	34.65°N 79.55°W	18:47–18:48	0.1 mi (0.16 km)	25 yd (23 m)
F0	Local law enforcement reported a brief tornado that did no damage.						
F1	NNE of Darlington	Darlington	SC	34.4°N 79.8167°W	19:11–19:12	0.1 mi (0.16 km)	30 yd (27 m)
F1	Several trees were snapped and a mobile home was damaged.						
F1	NE of Brunson to E of Fairfax	Hampton, Allendale	SC	32.9667°N 81.1167°W	19:30–19:45	4.5 mi (7.2 km)	100 yd (91 m)
F1	Numerous trees were uprooted or snapped by this tornado.						
F0	N of Society Hill	Chesterfield	SC	34.48°N 79.8333°W	19:50–19:52	1 mi (1.6 km)	150 yd (140 m)
F0	A weak tornado downed trees along US 52.						
F1	NW of Marietta	Robeson	NC	34.3833°N 79.1333°W	19:53–19:59	4.2 mi (6.8 km)	40 yd (37 m)
F1	Four homes were damaged, a shed was destroyed, and many trees were downed.						
F1	NE of Dundarrach	Hoke	NC	34.95°N 79.1167°W	19:56–19:58	0.5 mi (0.80 km)	25 yd (23 m)
F1	A brief tornado occurred.						
F0	Jenkinsville to W of Winnsboro	Fairfield	SC	34.2667°N 81.2833°W	20:00–20:32	16 mi (26 km)	400 yd (370 m)
F0	A tornado caused scattered tree damage along its intermittent path.						
F0	E of Ehrhardt	Bamberg	SC	33.1°N 81°W	20:20–20:22	0.5 mi (0.80 km)	100 yd (91 m)
F0	Trees and powerlines were downed.						
F0	NNE of Florence	Florence, Darlington	SC	34.23°N 79.7167°W	21:45–21:50	1 mi (1.6 km)	30 yd (27 m)
F0	This tornado damaged a billboard and snapped numerous trees.						
F0	ENE of Marietta	Robeson	NC	34.3833°N 79.0667°W	22:10–22:16	1.6 mi (2.6 km)	40 yd (37 m)
F0	A shed was destroyed and multiple trees were snapped.						
F0	ENE of Dillon	Dillon	SC	34.42°N 79.2667°W	23:11–23:14	1.3 mi (2.1 km)	30 yd (27 m)
F0	This tornado demolished and old barn and partially tore off a shed's roof. A few trees were also snapped, one of which fell onto a home and damaged the roof.						
F0	NE of Sandy Springs	Anderson	SC	34.6167°N 82.7333°W	23:30–23:32	1.2 mi (1.9 km)	50 yd (46 m)
F0	Several trees were uprooted and an aluminum cattle shelter was destroyed.						
F0	Neptune Beach	Duval	FL	30.3°N 81.4°W	23:50	1 mi (1.6 km)	1 yd (0.91 m)
F0	Approximately fifteen to twenty trees were downed. Three homes were damaged by some of the trees that fell.						
F1	SE of Chester	Chester	SC	34.6°N 81.0833°W	00:15–00:16	0.5 mi (0.80 km)	50 yd (46 m)
F1	A brief but damaging tornado touched down and damaged two small trailers and blew down several trees. It then tracked northward, ripping off a portion of a roof from a well-constructed home and blowing the home's garage wall inward. A carport next to the same home was destroyed. The tornado continued snapping or uprooting trees before destroying a trailer at a hunting club and then dissipating shortly after.						
F2	ENE of McBee	Chesterfield	SC	34.4667°N 80.1167°W	00:23–00:37	7 mi (11 km)	440 yd (400 m)
F2	This strong tornado completely destroyed two mobile homes and inflicted significant damage to several others. Hundreds of trees were downed and several powerlines were downed as well. Five people were injured.						
F0	S of Martin	Allendale	SC	32.9167°N 81.4667°W	01:05–01:10	0.5 mi (0.80 km)	40 yd (37 m)
F0	Several trees were bent or snapped in a cyclonic pattern.						
F0	WSW of Bennettsville	Marlboro	SC	34.58°N 79.73333°W	01:05–01:06	0.5 mi (0.80 km)	25 yd (23 m)
F0	A tornado damaged a steel conveyor belt track at a gravel and sand mine. The front porch of a church was ripped off and several trees were snapped as well.						
F0	W of Kline	Allendale	SC	33.12°N 81.4833°W	01:20–01:30	1 mi (1.6 km)	50 yd (46 m)
F0	Several trees were snapped or uprooted.						

===== September 8 event =====
List of confirmed tornadoes – Wednesday, September 8, 2004
F#	Location	County / Parish	State	Start Coord.	Time (UTC)	Path length	Max width
F1	ENE of Union	Union	SC	34.72°N 81.5167°W	04:00–04:06	4 mi (6.4 km)	225 yd (206 m)
F1	A mobile home was rolled, shingles and gutters were damaged and numerous trees were blown down and uprooted.						
F0	N of Rockfish	Hoke	NC	35.02°N 79.2167°W	08:55–08:58	0.5 mi (0.80 km)	50 yd (46 m)
F0	A roof of a house and a car were damaged from trees being downed onto them by this tornado. Several other trees were downed as well.						
F0	NW of Jackson	Northampton	NC	36.42°N 77.4333°W	12:30–?	3 mi (4.8 km)	100 yd (91 m)
F0	This intermittent tornado turned over a storage trailer, caused some tree damage and damaged the roof of a home.						
F0	ENE of Vass	Moore	NC	35.0167°N 79.0667°W	15:25–15:28	0.5 mi (0.80 km)	25 yd (23 m)
F0	A tornado briefly touched down.						
F0	SW of Sanford	Lee	NC	Unknown	15:30–15:33	0.5 mi (0.80 km)	50 yd (46 m)
F0	The roof of a home was damaged.						
F0	N of Carrboro	Orange	NC	Unknown	16:45–16:47	0.5 mi (0.80 km)	25 yd (23 m)
F0	This brief tornado touched down and did no damage.						
F1	SW of Ripley to S of Indian Head	Charles	MD	38.47°N 77.0667°W	16:58–17:07	5 mi (8.0 km)	150 yd (140 m)
F1	An intermittent tornado immediately damaged several storage facilities and shelters upon touching down. Numerous trees were snapped or uprooted in the area as well. A large RV was overturned and three other vehicles were damaged by flying debris and/or fallen trees. After moving northwest, the tornado then damaged several homes by downing trees onto them. Damage to the homes predominantly was the loss of shingles or siding. The tornado then briefly lifted before coming back down near Indian Head, uprooting approximately twenty to thirty large trees before dissipating.						
F0	Barbecue area	Harnett	NC	Unknown	17:20–17:23	0.5 mi (0.80 km)	25 yd (23 m)
F0	A brief tornado snapped a few trees.						
F0	S of Aylett	King William	VA	37.7833°N 77.1°W	18:05–?	1 mi (1.6 km)	100 yd (91 m)
F0	A roof was blown off a home.						
F2	S of Bealeton	Fauquier	VA	Unknown	18:20–18:25	1.5 mi (2.4 km)	200 yd (180 m)
F2	This strong tornado caused significant damage to two homes. One home had its roof partially peeled and showed signs of its walls bowing outwards. The second home had its garage door blown into the garage and out of the sidewall. Several projectiles were embedded into the outer wall on the south side of the home. Three large greenhouses and a few portable outhouses were damaged. Two Ryder trucks were overturned, one of which fell and crushed a small pickup truck.						
F1	S of Warrenton	Fauquier	VA	38.2333°N 78.3667°W	18:30–18:33	0.8 mi (1.3 km)	100 yd (91 m)
F1	Approximately twenty to thirty mature trees were uprooted or snapped.						
F1	Elkwood	Culpeper	VA	38.52°N 77.7667°W	18:57–19:00	0.3 mi (0.48 km)	100 yd (91 m)
F1	This tornado struck a greenhouse complex, completely destroying a building with a sturdy metal roof. Two cars in the parking lot were moved and a truck was tipped over.						
F1	Bowling Green area to NE of White Oak	Caroline, King George, Stafford	VA	38.0333°N 77.35°W	19:25–20:14	17.8 mi (28.6 km)	300 yd (270 m)
F1	A tornado damaged or destroyed numerous outbuildings and snapped or uprooted hundreds of trees. Near the end of its path, three boats in a dry dock were displaced.						
F0	Boswell's Corner area to S of Triangle	Stafford, Prince William	VA	38.45°N 77.9667°W	20:18–20:38	5.5 mi (8.9 km)	150 yd (140 m)
F0	This tornado began near US 1, inflicting minor damage to trees and tearing off siding and shingles from a few homes. It then impacted a neighborhood, causing extensive tree damage throughout the area before lifting just over the county line in Prince William County.						
F0	WNW of Gold Hill	Buckingham	VA	37.63°N 78.4°W	20:30	0.8 mi (1.3 km)	33 yd (30 m)
F0	Numerous trees were snapped or damaged.						
F0	N of Delaplane	Fauquier	VA	38.0333°N 78.5°W	21:05–21:07	0.3 mi (0.48 km)	100 yd (91 m)
F0	A brief tornado uprooted or snapped trees.						
F0	N of Berryville	Clarke	VA	38.5167°N 77.3333°W	21:30–21:32	0.3 mi (0.48 km)	50 yd (46 m)
F0	A few trees were snapped.						
F0	Truxillo area	Amelia	VA	37.3667°N 78.0333°W	21:40	0.5 mi (0.80 km)	50 yd (46 m)
F0	A brief tornado twisted off a couple of tree tops near the intersection of SR 639 and SR 681.						
F0	W of Palmyra	Fluvanna	VA	37.8667°N 78.3333°W	21:40–?	1 mi (1.6 km)	100 yd (91 m)
F0	A mobile home was demolished, the roof of a home was blown off, and trees were downed.						
F0	Montpelier Station area	Fluvanna	VA	38.5167°N 77.85°W	22:40–22:42	0.3 mi (0.48 km)	50 yd (46 m)
F0	A few trees and powerlines were downed.						
F0	SW of Midlothian	Chesterfield	VA	37.48°N 77.6667°W	23:15	0.5 mi (0.80 km)	50 yd (46 m)
F0	Minor tree damage occurred.						
F0	Eastern Richmond	Henrico, City of Richmond	VA	37.48°N 77.4333°W	00:20–00:24	0.7 mi (1.1 km)	50 yd (46 m)
F0	A tornado touched down along SR 5 and caused damage to outbuildings, storage facilities and several businesses along the state highway. The tornado then moved into the far eastern city limits of Richmond, producing more minor damage to businesses before dissipating.						

=== Canada ===
While over the southeastern United States, Frances's circulation contributed to three days of smog across southern Ontario. As the remnants of Frances moved into Canada, it produced heavy rainfall, reaching 5.4 in (137 mm) in Kingston, Ontario, and Ottawa recorded 5.3 in (135 mm) of precipitation. The rains led to widespread floods across southeastern Ontario. Insured damage throughout the province totaled over CA$45 million (US$35 million). In Quebec, New Brunswick, and Newfoundland, Frances's rains also caused floods and washed out roads.

== Aftermath ==
=== Bahamas ===
After the hurricane moved through the Bahamas, officials first focused on clearing roadways and restoring utilities on New Providence. Surveys for the remainder of the country began on September 5. Around 150 electrical workers assisted in power restoration. Telecommunications were restored to most of the island chain within 24 hours. Food and water was transported by plane to Grand Bahama, where thousands of residents were left without food or water. In Freeport, the Salvation Army provided thousands of meals, water, and basic supplies. By September 21, electricity had been restored to half of the Bahamians affected by the outages. Western sections of Grand Bahama Island remained without power by the time Hurricane Jeanne struck the island three weeks after Frances. The two hurricanes produced more than $550 million in damage and economic losses, equating to about 10% of the country's gross domestic product. On September 27, Bahamian Prime Minister Perry Christie declared a state of emergency and requested international assistance for rebuilding. The Bahamian government spent $1.3 million on bug and rat control, as well as water and food monitoring. Residents were provided mental health counseling services related to disaster stress management.

The United States Agency for International Development (USAID) provided $100,000 to the Bahamas for buying emergency supplies and conducting damage assessments. The agency sent three flights from Miami that carried plastic sheeting, hygiene kits, and a water purification system. The Inter-American Development Bank provided a $50,000 grant toward food, water, and medicine. Catholic Relief Services sent $10,000 to assist in emergency efforts.

=== United States ===
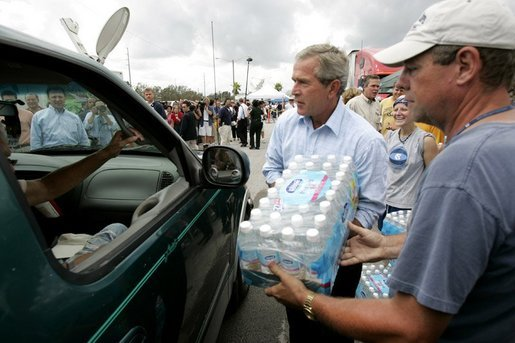
President George W. Bush helps deliver water at a relief center in Ft. Pierce, Florida.

The collective response to hurricanes Charley, Frances, Ivan, and Jeanne represented the largest operations in the history of both the American Red Cross and the Federal Emergency Management Agency (FEMA). The previous largest FEMA operation was the response to the 1994 Northridge earthquake. Damage to the Florida citrus crop caused orange futures to rise 4¢ per pound. The collective effects of hurricanes Charley, Frances, and Jeanne damaged about one-third of the state's orange crop and two-thirds of the state's grapefruit. The hurricanes also resulted in increased costs for labor, after the migrant workers shifted from being citrus pickers to working in reconstruction. Ten years after the hurricanes, the citrus industry had not fully recovered, partly due to citrus greening disease. The collective impacts of the 2004 hurricanes led to the United States Army Corps of Engineers installing blue tarpaulins on more than 115,000 damaged roofs statewide.

Due to Frances's power outages across Florida, central parts of the state were advised to boil water until a week after the hurricane's passage. A day after Frances struck Florida, all but three school districts were closed across the state. Indian River, Martin, Okeechobee, Palm Beach, Polk, and St. Lucie county schools closed just prior to Frances and did not resume classes until October 4 – more than a month after the hurricane. Looting occurred in the storm's aftermath, leading to 11 people being arrested. Around 8,000 members of the National Guard assisted with recovery efforts. The American Red Cross provided more than 5.5 million meals to residents affected by hurricanes Charley and Frances. Federal employees were granted excused absences if they helped with law enforcement and the cleanup. Thousands of portable generators were sent to the state by Home Depot and Lowe's home improvement stores. In July 2005, the company responsible for the wastewater spill, Mosaic Fertilizer, was fined $270,000. The company also implemented an environmental restoration project that was completed in 2014. The project included the construction of a 3,500 sq ft (330 m^{2}) oyster reef, the removal of invasive plants, and the widening and deepening of tidal creeks.

Trucks delivered water to towns in western North Carolina without a water supply. Parts of Asheville and Black Mountain were without water for five days. A week after Frances flooded parts of western North Carolina, the region was flooded again by Hurricane Ivan. The two storms contributed to rainfall records across the western portion of the state. After the floods, Buncombe County cleared debris from 115 mi (185 km) of rivers and streams. City and county officials purchased properties along the floodplain using FEMA funding. Following the back-to-back floods, Asheville began requiring that new buildings in potential flood areas be built at least 2 ft (0.61 m) higher and started keeping water reservoir levels deliberately low during hurricane season as a precaution. The North Carolina state government passed the Hurricane Recovery Act in 2005 to develop new landslide maps.

The response to Hurricane Frances included actions by federal, state, and local governments. President Bush designated the entirety of Florida as a federal disaster area, and the federal government ultimately approved more than $1 billion in aid. This included 229,586 applications approved for individual assistance. Kennedy Space Center was closed for 11 days until September 13. The facility was closed and damaged again by Hurricane Jeanne, although to a lesser extent. On October 13, President George W. Bush authorized $124 million in funding toward NASA facility repairs. On September 10, President Bush declared 33 counties within North Carolina a disaster area, providing nearly $40 million in public and individual aid. President Bush also designated a disaster area for 68 counties across Georgia, in which federal public assistance was available. Secretary of Agriculture Ann Veneman designated 116 counties as disaster areas, in which loans were provided by the Farm Service Agency. The federal government spent about $15.3 million statewide. A federal disaster declaration covered 28 counties in South Carolina, mainly across the state's northern portion. The federal government provided $7.2 million to the state, with 4,399 people receiving individual assistance.

FEMA received criticism for honoring some bogus requests for assistance or haphazardly inspecting damages, which led to some storm victims being greatly overcompensated, particularly in Miami-Dade County. Although FEMA declared a disaster area for the county, local officials stated that Frances caused only minimal damage. On May 18, 2005, the United States Senate Committee on Homeland Security and Governmental Affairs held a hearing, which noted that almost 12,600 residents in the county received payments totaling over $31 million. The aid allowed people to replace thousands of electronic appliances, some of which they may have never owned. Other residents received payments to repairs replacements almost 800 cars, with some people being compensated for more than their vehicle was worth. FEMA also compensated some residents with rental or home repairs assistance, but hastily inspected damage or did not inspect damage altogether. In one instance, a resident collected almost $18,500 from FEMA, but a second inspection of the property revealed no damage at all.

=== Retirement ===
Because of the hurricane's effects, the name Frances was retired from the rotating lists of tropical cyclone names in the spring of 2005 by the World Meteorological Organization, and will never again be used for an Atlantic basin tropical cyclone. Frances's retirement was already requested ahead of the season by a delegate from France, and would have been retired regardless of the storm's impacts. The name Frances was replaced with Fiona for the 2010 season.

== See also ==
- Timeline of the 2004 Atlantic hurricane season
- List of Florida hurricanes (2000–present)
- List of Category 4 Atlantic hurricanes
