= Judah (surname) =

Judah is a Jewish surname. Notable people with the surname include:

- Ben Judah (born 1988), British journalist and author
- Gerry Judah (born 1951), British artist and designer
- Henry M. Judah (1821–1866), American soldier
- Marietta Judah (1812–1883), American stage actress
- Theodore Judah (1826–1863), American engineer who dreamed of the first transcontinental railroad
- Tim Judah (born 1962), British historian and journalist
- Yoel Judah (born 1956), American kickboxer, boxer and trainer; 3-times world champion
- Zab Judah "Super" (born 1977), American welterweight boxer; world junior champion and world champion
