= Naughty Girl =

Naughty Girl(s) may refer to:

- "Naughty Girl" (Beyoncé song), 2003
- "Naughty Girl" (Holly Valance song), 2002
- "Naughty Girl" (Mr G song), 2008
- Naughty Girl (film), a 1956 French musical film
- "Naughty Girls (Need Love Too)", a 1987 song by Samantha Fox

== See also ==
- The Naughtiest Girl, a novel series by Enid Blyton
- Naughty Cinderella, a 1933 British comedy film
- Naughty Marietta (disambiguation)
- Nasty Girl (disambiguation)
- Naughty Boy (disambiguation)
- Naughty Baby (disambiguation)
