= Nasty Boys (disambiguation) =

The Nasty Boys are a professional wrestling tag team.

Nasty Boy(s) may also refer to:

- Nasty Boys (film), a 1989 American television film
  - Nasty Boys (TV series), a 1990 series based on the film
- Nasty Boys (Cincinnati Reds), a 1990s trio of baseball relief pitchers
- Nasty Boys (comics), a Marvel Comics supervillain team
- A Nasty Boy, a Nigerian LGBTQ magazine
- "Nasty Boy", a song by The Notorious B.I.G. from Life After Death

== See also ==
- Nasty (disambiguation)
- Nasty Girl (disambiguation)
- Naughty Boy (disambiguation)
