= Naughty Boys =

Naughty Boys may refer to:

- Naughty Boys (album), a 1983 album by Yellow Magic Orchestra
- Naughty Boys (film), a 1986 Hong Kong martial arts crime comedy film

== See also ==
- Naughty Boy (disambiguation)
