= Naughty Boy (disambiguation) =

Naughty Boy is an English DJ, musician and producer.

Naughty Boy or Naughty Boys may also refer to:

- Naughty Boy (film), a 1962 Bollywood film
- "Naughty Boy" (song), a 1997 single by Australian band The Mavis's
- Naughty Boy (video game), a 1982 video game by Jaleco
- Naughty Boy, a German dance group featuring members of Bass Bumpers
- Naughty Boy Ma Xiaotiao or Mo's Mischief (淘气包马小跳), a Chinese series of children's books by Yang Hongying
- Naughty Boys (album), a 1982 music album by Yellow Magic Orchestra
- "Naughty Boy", a 2018 song by Pentagon from the EP Thumbs Up!

== See also ==
- Naughty Boys (disambiguation)
- Naughty Girl (disambiguation)
- Nasty Boys (disambiguation)
