= USS Marietta =

USS Marietta is a name used more than once by the U.S. Navy:

- USS Marietta (1803), was a 5‑gun, 28‑oared row gunboat that participated in the War of 1812
- USS Marietta (1864), was a light draft, single‑turreted, ironclad, screw monitor
- USS Marietta (PG-15), was a schooner rigged gunboat commissioned 1 September 1897
- USS Marietta (AN-82), was a net layer launched 27 April 1945.
