= Nasty Girl =

Nasty Girl may refer to:

- The Nasty Girl, a 1990 film directed by Michael Verhoeven
- "Nasty Girl" (Vanity 6 song), 1982 written by Prince, later re-released by Inaya Day
- "Nasty Girl" (Destiny's Child song), 2002
- "Nasty Girl" (Nitty song), March 2005
- "Nasty Girl" (The Notorious B.I.G. song), October 2005
- "Nasty Girl" (Ludacris song), 2009
- "Nasty Girl", a song by Sterling Simms from his 2007 album Yours, Mine & The Truth
- "Nasty Girl/On Camera", by Gunna from the 2020 album Wunna
- "U a Freak (Nasty Girl)", a song by Chingy from his 2006 album Hoodstar

== See also ==
- Nasty Gal, U.S. online retailer
- Nasty Baby, 2015 Chilean-American film
- "Nasty", Tinashe song, 2024
- Nasty Boys (disambiguation)
- Naughty Girl (disambiguation)
