= Franklin Theatre =

Coordinates: 40.7131°N 73.9988°W

The Franklin Theatre was a theatre located at 175 Chatham Street (now Park Row) between James and Oliver Streets in Lower Manhattan, New York City, New York. A smaller venue with a seating capacity of five hundred and fifty people, it originally operated under the management of William E. Dinneford who leased the theater for the 1835-1836 season. It opened to the public on September 7, 1835 with a performance of The Golden Farmer; a hit production which was repeated more than one hundred times. It was initially known for its quality productions with strong actors. Mary Ann Duff was an early star at the venue. The Panic of 1837 had a negative impact on the theater, and the strength of its offerings began to decline. Marietta Judah gave her first performance in New York at the Franklin Theatre on October 12, 1840.

In April 1841 the name of the venue was briefly changed to the Little Drury Theatre before becoming the Little Franklin Theatre in August 1841. At some point in the 1840s its name was changed to the Old Drury. During this period it offered variety theatre, minstrel show entertainments, and German language productions. It was converted into a dime museum along the lines of Barnum's American Museum and re-named the Franklin Museum in 1848. The museum and its theatre continued to operate until 1854; offering twice daily exhibitions and magic lantern shows. The exhibitions included "living statue" which were an excuse for audiences to view scantily dressed models. Its final performance was given on April 22, 1854. After this it was converted into a furniture store.
