= Nasty =

Nasty may refer to:

== Film and television ==
- Nasty (film), or Shameless, a 2008 Czech film
- "Nasty" (The Young Ones), a 1984 TV episode

== Music ==
=== Albums ===
- Nasty! or the title track, by Johnny "Hammond" Smith, 1968
- Nasty (album) or the title song, by Cameo, 1996
- Nasty (mixtape), by Rico Nasty, 2018
- Nasty, by Ronald Shannon Jackson, 1981

=== Songs ===
- "Nasty" (Bandit Gang Marco song), 2014
- "Nasty" (Janet Jackson song), 1986
- "Nasty" (Nas song), 2011
- "Nasty" (Pixie Lott song), 2014
- "Nasty" (The Prodigy song), 2015
- "Nasty" (Russ song), 2023
- "Nasty" (Tinashe song), 2024
- "Nasty" (Tyga and Chris Brown song), 2022
- "Nasty", by Ariana Grande from Positions, 2020
- "Nasty", by Brooke Candy, 2016
- "Nasty", by DaBaby from Blame It on Baby, 2020
- "Nasty", by the Damned, created for the episode of The Young Ones, released as the B-side of the single "Thanks for the Night"
- "Nasty", by Kid Ink, 2016
- "Nasty", by Nav from Emergency Tsunami, 2020
- "Nasty", by Parris Goebel, 2016
- "Nasty (Who Dat)", by ASAP Ferg from Still Striving, 2017

== People ==
- Ilie Năstase (born 1946), nicknamed "Nasty", Romanian retired tennis player
- Billy Nasty (active 1990-), British techno and electro DJ and artist
- Dee Nasty (born 1960), French DJ
- Freak Nasty (active 1994-), American hip hop artist
- Freq Nasty (born 1969), DJ and breakbeat producer
- Nas (born 1973), formerly Nasty Nas, American rapper
- Nasty C (born 1997), South African Rapper
- Nasty Canasta, cartoon character
- Nasty Nigel (rapper) (born 1989), American rapper
- Nasty P (active 2000-), Scottish hip hop Producer/DJ
- Nasty Suicide (born 1963), Finnish musician
- Pink Nasty (active 2003-), American singer-songwriter
- Rico Nasty (born 1997), American rapper
- V-Nasty (born 1990), American rapper

== Other uses ==
- Nasty, Hertfordshire, a hamlet in England
- -nasty, in biology, a suffix for terms that describe nastic movements
- Nasty-type patrol boat, a class of Norwegian motor torpedo boat of the 1950s and 1960s
- Nasty Party, term used for the British Conservative Party, discussed in a speech by Theresa May in 2002
- Video nasty, a term referring to violent video recordings
