= Naughty Baby =

Naughty Baby may refer to:

- "Naughty Baby", a song from the 1924 musical Primrose
- Naughty Baby (album), a 1989 live album by Maureen McGovern
- Naughty Baby (film), a 1928 silent film
