= Marietta Township =

Marietta Township may refer to one of the following places in the United States:

- Marietta Township, Marshall County, Iowa
- Marietta Township, Saunders County, Nebraska
- Marietta Township, Washington County, Ohio
