= SS Marietta =

A number of steamship have been named Marietta or similarly.

- SS Marietta (1943), a British cargo ship in service 1946–59
- SS Marietta E, A British cargos ships in service 1940–43, torpedoed and sunk by U-160
