= Naughty Marietta =

Naughty Marietta may refer to:

- Naughty Marietta (operetta), the original 1910 Victor Herbert operetta
- Naughty Marietta (film), the 1935 film version starring Jeanette MacDonald and Nelson Eddy
- Naughty Marietta (television), the 1955 live television version of the operetta starring Patrice Munsel and Alfred Drake

== See also ==
- Naughty Cinderella, 1933 British comedy film
- Naughty Girl (disambiguation)
