= Marietta Historic District =

Marietta Historic District may refer to:

- Northwest Marietta Historic District, in Marietta, Georgia
- Marietta Historic District (Marietta, Ohio), in the city of Marietta, Washington County, Ohio
- Marietta Historic District (Marietta, Pennsylvania), in the borough of Marietta, Lancaster County, Pennsylvania
