= Marietta City Schools =

Marietta City Schools may refer to either of two school districts in the United States:

- Marietta City Schools (Georgia) in Marietta, Georgia
- Marietta City Schools (Ohio) in Marietta, Ohio
