= Kline, South Carolina =

- Town
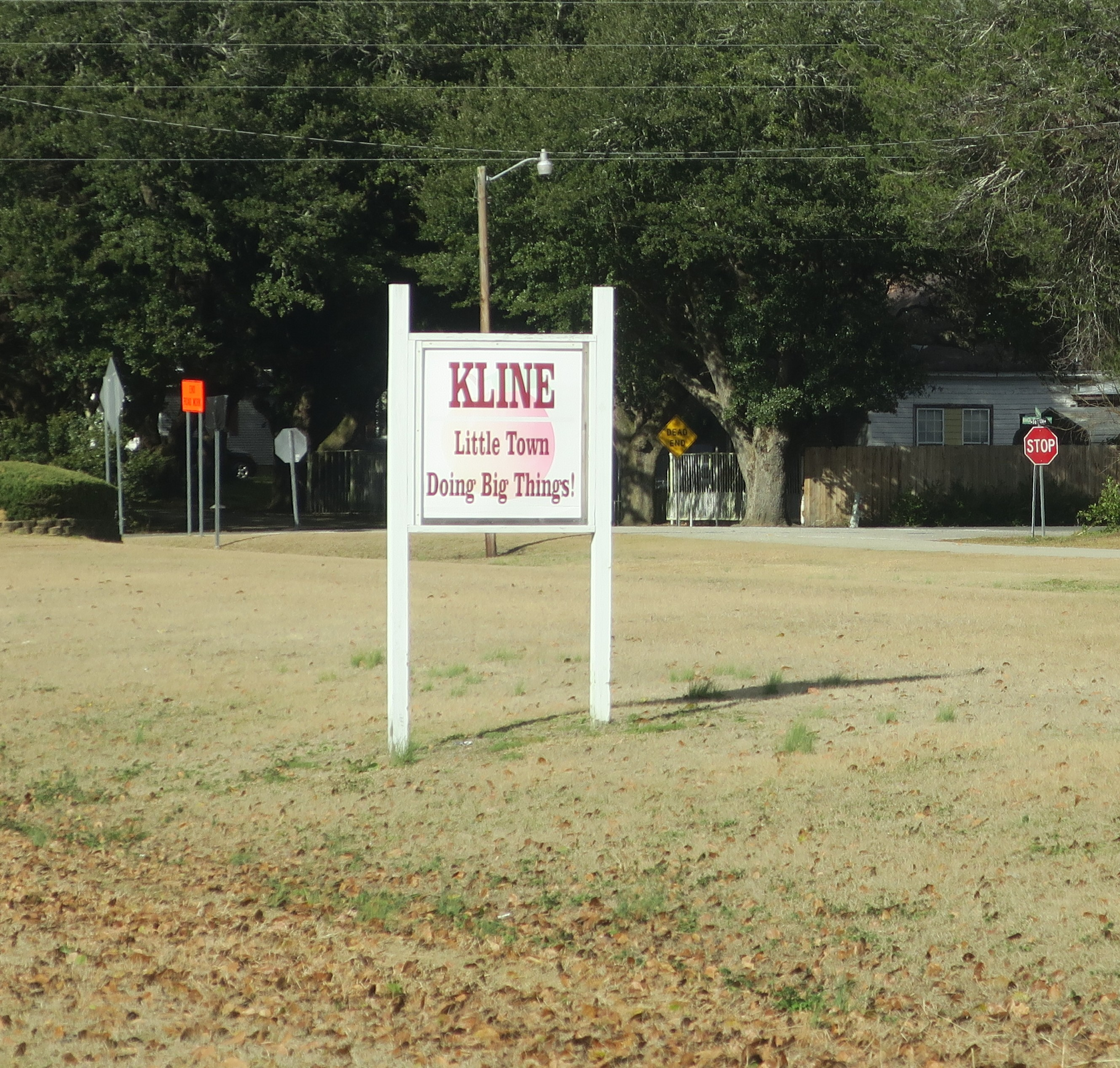
- Kline welcome sign

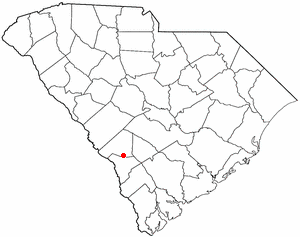
- Location of Kline, South Carolina
- Coordinates: 33°07′19″N 81°20′33″W
- Country: United States
- State: South Carolina
- County: Barnwell

Area
  - Total: 3.13 sq mi (8.11 km^{2})
  - Land: 3.10 sq mi (8.04 km^{2})
  - Water: 0.027 sq mi (0.07 km^{2})
- Elevation: 246 ft (75 m)

Population (2020)
  - Total: 148
  - Density: 48/sq mi (18.4/km^{2})
- Time zone: UTC-5 (Eastern (EST))
  - Summer (DST): UTC-4 (EDT)
- ZIP code: 29812
- Area codes: 803, 839
- FIPS code: 45-38950
- GNIS feature ID: 2405957

Kline is a town in Barnwell County, South Carolina, United States. As of the 2020 census, Kline had a population of 148.

== Geography ==
Kline is located in southern Barnwell County. U.S. Route 278 passes through the center of the town, leading north 8 miles (13 km) to Barnwell, the county seat, and south 8 miles (13 km) to Allendale.

According to the United States Census Bureau, the town has a total area of 3.1 square miles (8.1 km^{2}), of which 0.027 square miles (0.07 km^{2}), or 0.81%, is water.

== Demographics ==
Historical population
Census	Pop.	Note	%±
1900	93		—
1910	199		114.0%
1920	238		19.6%
1930	214		−10.1%
1940	282		31.8%
1950	230		−18.4%
1960	213		−7.4%
1970	305		43.2%
1980	315		3.3%
1990	285		−9.5%
2000	238		−16.5%
2010	197		−17.2%
2020	148		−24.9%
U.S. Decennial Census

=== 2020 census ===
Kline town, South Carolina – Racial and ethnic composition Note: the US Census treats Hispanic/Latino as an ethnic category. This table excludes Latinos from the racial categories and assigns them to a separate category. Hispanics/Latinos may be of any race.
Race / Ethnicity (NH = Non-Hispanic)	Pop 2000	Pop 2010	Pop 2020	% 2000	% 2010	% 2020
White alone (NH)	59	90	57	24.79%	45.69%	38.51%
Black or African American alone (NH)	135	88	61	56.72%	44.67%	41.22%
Native American or Alaska Native alone (NH)	0	0	1	0.00%	0.00%	0.68%
Asian alone (NH)	0	0	0	0.00%	0.00%	0.00%
Native Hawaiian or Pacific Islander alone (NH)	0	0	2	0.00%	0.00%	1.35%
Other race alone (NH)	0	0	0	0.00%	0.00%	0.00%
Mixed race or Multiracial (NH)	0	1	13	0.00%	0.51%	8.78%
Hispanic or Latino (any race)	44	18	14	18.49%	9.14%	9.46%
Total	238	197	148	100.00%	100.00%	100.00%

=== 2000 census ===
At the 2000 census there were 238 people, 87 households, and 62 families living in the town. The population density was 76.6 inhabitants per square mile (29.6/km^{2}). There were 112 housing units at an average density of 36.1 per square mile (13.9/km^{2}). The racial makeup of the town was 26.89% White, 57.56% African American, 14.71% from other races, and 0.84% from two or more races. Hispanic or Latino of any race were 18.49%.

Of the 87 households 34.5% had children under the age of 18 living with them, 39.1% were married couples living together, 19.5% had a female householder with no husband present, and 27.6% were non-families. 23.0% of households were one person and 14.9% were one person aged 65 or older. The average household size was 2.74 and the average family size was 3.22.

The age distribution was 29.0% under the age of 18, 7.1% from 18 to 24, 26.5% from 25 to 44, 21.0% from 45 to 64, and 16.4% 65 or older. The median age was 37 years. For every 100 females, there were 93.5 males. For every 100 females age 18 and over, there were 85.7 males.

The median household income was $14,821 and the median family income was $22,083. Males had a median income of $30,179 versus $17,292 for females. The per capita income for the town was $10,045. About 36.6% of families and 45.9% of the population were below the poverty line, including 72.1% of those under the age of eighteen and 37.3% of those sixty five or over.
