= Marietta High School =

Marietta High School may refer to one of three public schools in the U.S.:

- Marietta High School (Georgia) in Marietta, Georgia
- Marietta High School (Ohio) in Marietta, Ohio
- Marrietta High School (Oklahoma) in Marietta, Oklahoma
