= Marietta-class monitor =

United States Navy's Marietta-class monitors

Class overview
- Name: Marietta class
- Builders: Tomlinson and Hartupee Co., Pittsburgh, Pennsylvania
- Operators: United States Navy
- Built: 1862–1865
- Completed: 2
- Retired: 2

General characteristics
- Type: River monitor
- Displacement: 479 long tons (487 t)
- Length: 170 ft (51.8 m)
- Beam: 50 ft (15.2 m)
- Draft: 5 ft (1.5 m)
- Propulsion: 4 × boilers; 2 × steam engines; 1 × propeller
- Speed: 9 knots (17 km/h; 10 mph)
- Complement: 100 officers and enlisted
- Armament: 2 × 11-inch (279 mm) smoothbore Dahlgren guns
- Armor: Gun turret: 6 in (152 mm); Pilothouse: 6 in (152 mm); Hull: 1.25 in (32 mm); Deck: 1.25 in (32 mm)

The Marietta-class monitors were a pair of ironclad river monitors laid down in the summer of 1862 for the United States Navy during the American Civil War. Construction was slow, partially for lack of labor, and the ships were not completed until December 1865, after the war was over. However the navy did not accept them until 1866 and immediately laid them up. They were sold in 1873 without ever having been commissioned.

== Design and description ==
The Marietta-class monitors were part of a large program of armored ships ordered after the Battle of Hampton Roads caused the navy to favor monitors over the previous casemate ironclads of the City class. They were built to gain control of the Mississippi River and its many tributaries.

The original plans for the Marietta-class ships resembled the river monitor USS Ozark in many ways. The gun turret was at the bow and they had a deckhouse aft. There were also twin smokestacks similar to the Mississippi River steamboat designs. The original plans also called for a forward, pyramidal pilothouse, similar to the one on USS Monitor, however it is believed that the pilothouse was moved to the top of the turret before construction was completed. The Marietta-class ships were 177 feet (53.9 m) long overall. They had a beam of 50 feet (15.2 m) and a draft of 5 feet (1.5 m). They displaced 479 long tons (487 t). The ships had four steam boilers powering two western steamboat-type engines that drove a single propeller. (Note: Some sources refer to four 6-foot-6-inch (2.0 m) propellers. See Gibbons, p. 62) The Marietta-class ships had a maximum speed of 9 knots (17 km/h; 10 mph) and they carried a maximum of 150 long tons (150 t) of coal.

The ships' main armament consisted of two smoothbore, muzzle-loading 11-inch (279 mm) Dahlgren guns mounted in a single gun turret. Each gun weighed approximately 16,000 pounds (7,300 kg). They could fire a 136-pound (61.7 kg) shell up to a range of 3,650 yards (3,340 m) at an elevation of 15°. The turret and the pilothouse were protected by 6 inches (152 mm) of wrought iron armor while the deck and hull had 1.25 inches (32 mm) of armor.

== Construction ==
The contract for the two ships was awarded to Tomlinson and Hartupee Co. on 16 May 1862. Construction was at their yard in Pittsburgh, Pennsylvania. Progress was slow, delayed by labor shortages and changes by the navy. The US government allocated $188,000 each for the construction of Marietta and Sandusky, but the final cost rose to $235,039 after charges for extra work.

== History ==
Marietta was laid down in 1862, launched on 4 January 1865 and completed 16 December 1865. "She was accepted by the Navy on 25 April 1866. She was never commissioned. Soon after her acceptance Marietta was laid up at Mound City, Illinois. Renamed Circe on 15 June 1869, the gunboat carried that name only until 10 August, when she was again named Marietta. Remaining at Mound City, Marietta was sold 12 April 1873 to David Campbell" for $16,000.

Sandusky was launched in mid-January 1865; "she was not completed until 26 December 1865, and was accepted by the Navy on 25 April 1866. Never commissioned, she was renamed Minerva on 15 June 1869; but resumed the name Sandusky on 10 August 1869. The monitor was sold at Mound City, Illinois, on 17 April 1873 to David Campbell" for $18,000.
