= Marietta Judah =

American stage actress (1812–1883)

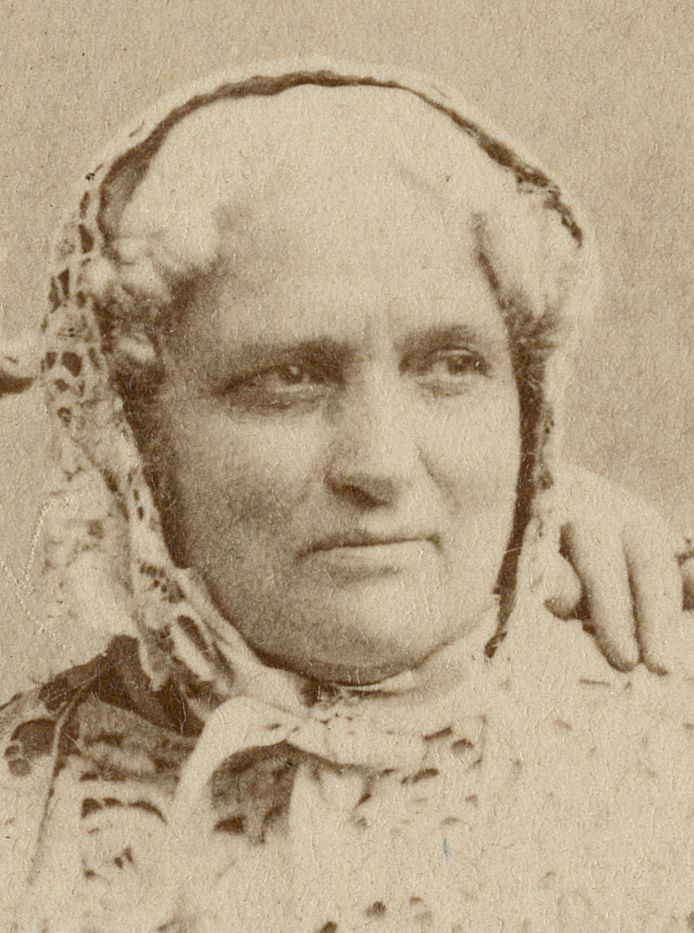
- Marietta Judah playing the Nurse in Shakespeare's Romeo and Juliet
- Born: c. 1812
- Died: March 1, 1883
- Occupation: Actress

Marietta Judah (born Marietta Starfield, c. 1812 – March 1, 1883) was an American stage actress. She was a successful actress in the American South and New York during the 1830s and 1840s and became famous in California of the Old West from 1851, where she became one of the pioneer actors and known as "San Francisco's Favorite Actress" and "Grand Old Woman of the Western Stage".

== Life and career ==
Marietta Starfield was born in Orange County, New York in c. 1812. At a young age she married Emanuel Judah who was the leader of an orchestra in Boston. They had several children, including the actress Ione Judah. With her husband she traveled throughout the American South with him working as a theatre conductor and her a stage actress. She had her first triumphs on the stage in New Orleans, Louisiana and Tallahassee, Florida. In New Orleans she performed at Russel's Theatre in 1840.

In April 1840 the Judah family was shipwrecked off the coast of southern Florida on a ship that departed from Tallahassee on its way to either Galveston, Texas or Havana, Cuba (sources disagree). Emanuel and two of the Judah children drowned, but Marietta and Ione survived (and possibly one or more other daughters according to Bricklin). Sources disagree over the exact nature of Marietta's survival, with James Fisher claiming her husband saved her by lashing her to a spar before he drowned, and Marion Moore Coleman stating that Marietta tied herself to the spar and clung onto her children for four days before being rescued.

After the death of her first husband, Marietta nurtured the stage careers of her daughters. On October 12, 1840 Marietta, known on the stage as Mrs. Judah, gave her first performance in New York City at the Franklin Theatre with George Handel Hill's theatre troupe. This was followed by performances at the Chatham Theatre. After this she had several successes at the Boston Museum theatre. In 1851 she married the stage carpenter John Torrence. They moved to California in 1852 and she remained there for the rest of her life. She had a highly successful stage career in California, particularly in San Francisco where she had a lengthy stage career.

Marietta Judah died in San Francisco, California on March 1, 1883.
