= Marietta, North Carolina =

- Town
- Location within the state of North Carolina
- Coordinates: 34°22′06″N 79°07′29″W
- Country: United States
- State: North Carolina
- County: Robeson

Government
  - Mayor: Justin Oliver

Area
  - Total: 1.12 sq mi (2.89 km^{2})
  - Land: 1.12 sq mi (2.89 km^{2})
  - Water: 0 sq mi (0.00 km^{2})
- Elevation: 89 ft (27 m)

Population (2020)
  - Total: 111
  - Density: 99.4/sq mi (38.36/km^{2})
- Time zone: UTC-5 (Eastern (EST))
  - Summer (DST): UTC-4 (EDT)
- ZIP code: 28362
- Area codes: 910, 472
- FIPS code: 37-41380

Marietta is a town located in Robeson County, North Carolina, United States. At the 2020 census, the population was 111.

== Geography ==
According to the United States Census Bureau, the town has a total area of 1.1 square miles (2.8 km^{2}), all land.

== Economy ==
Marietta's economy was centered on tobacco farming for much of its history. Marietta often relies on nearby towns, such as Lumberton and Fairmont, for commercial goods and services.

== Demographics ==
Historical population
Census	Pop.	Note	%±
1990	206		—
2000	164		−20.4%
2010	175		6.7%
2020	111		−36.6%
U.S. Decennial Census

As of the census of 2000, there were 164 people, 60 households, and 43 families residing in the town. The population density was 145.9 inhabitants per square mile (56.3/km^{2}). There were 67 housing units at an average density of 59.6 per square mile (23.0/km^{2}). The racial makeup of the town was 53.05% White, 46.34% African American, 0.00% Native American, 0.00% Asian, 0.00% Pacific Islander, 0.00% from other races, and 0.61% from two or more races. Zero percent of the population were Hispanic or Latino of any race.

There were 60 households, out of which 36.7% had children under the age of 18 living with them, 53.3% were married couples living together, 13.3% had a female householder with no husband present, and 28.3% were non-families. Twenty-three percent of all households were made up of individuals, and 11.7% had someone living alone who was 65 years of age or older. The average household size was 2.73 and the average family size was 3.23.

In the town, the population was spread out, with 26.2% under the age of 18, 7.3% from 18 to 24, 28.0% from 25 to 44, 26.8% from 45 to 64, and 11.6% who were 65 years of age or older. The median age was 40 years. For every 100 females, there were 102.5 males. For every 100 females age 18 and over, there were 92.1 males.

The median income for a household in the town was $30,938, and the median income for a family was $50,417. Males had a median income of $23,750 versus $19,750 for females. The per capita income for the town was $15,490. Nearly 10% of the population and 9.3% of families were below the poverty line, while 8.5% of those under the age of 18 and 5.9% of those 65 and older were living below the poverty line.
