= National Register of Historic Places listings in Lancaster County, South Carolina =

Location of Lancaster County in South Carolina

This is a list of the National Register of Historic Places listings in Lancaster County, South Carolina.

This is intended to be a complete list of the properties and districts on the National Register of Historic Places in Lancaster County, South Carolina, United States. The locations of National Register properties and districts for which the latitude and longitude coordinates are included below, may be seen in a map.

There are 29 properties and districts listed on the National Register in the county, including 2 National Historic Landmarks. Another 2 properties were once listed but have been removed.

This National Park Service list is complete through NPS recent listings posted September 19, 2025.

== Current listings ==
	Name on the Register	Image	Date listed	Location	City or town	Description
1	Robert Barnwell Allison House	Robert Barnwell Allison House	January 4, 1990 (#89002148)	404 Chesterfield Ave. 34°43′02″N 80°45′43″W	Lancaster	
2	Battle of Hanging Rock Historic Site		December 31, 1974 (#74001860)	About 3.5 miles south of Heath Springs off U.S. Route 521; 34°33′31″N 80°39′54″W	Heath Springs	
3	Buford's Massacre Site	Buford's Massacre Site	February 15, 1990 (#90000091)	South Carolina Highway 522, 0.25 miles south of South Carolina Highway 9; 34°44′26″N 80°37′35″W	Tradesville	
4	Dr. William Columbus Cauthen House	Dr. William Columbus Cauthen House	June 28, 1982 (#82003872)	South Carolina Highway 75; 34°33′19″N 80°38′30″W	Kershaw	
5	Clinton AME Zion Church	Clinton AME Zion Church	February 16, 1990 (#90000092)	Johnson and Church Sts. 34°32′57″N 80°35′14″W	Kershaw	
6	Craig House	Craig House	February 16, 1990 (#90000093)	South Carolina Highway 185/Craig Dr. 34°45′28″N 80°46′01″W	Lancaster	
7	Cureton House	Cureton House	September 4, 1990 (#90000094)	County Road 29, south of County Road 39; 34°48′29″N 80°51′02″W	Lancaster	
8	Ellen Dean Hotel		June 13, 2022 (#100007778)	113-141 North White St. 34°43′16″N 80°46′12″W	Lancaster	
9	East Richland Street-East Church Street Historic District	East Richland Street-East Church Street Historic District	January 4, 1990 (#89002142)	Roughly bounded by E. Church St., Ingram St., E. Richland St., and Hart St. 34°33′03″N 80°34′47″W	Kershaw	
10	Heath Springs Depot	Heath Springs Depot	January 4, 1990 (#89002147)	E. Railroad Ave. 34°35′39″N 80°40′30″W	Heath Springs	
11	Thomas Walker Huey House	Thomas Walker Huey House	January 4, 1990 (#89002146)	Junction of South Carolina Highways 200 and 285; 34°48′54″N 80°43′01″W	Lancaster	
12	Adam Ivy House		September 4, 1990 (#89002144)	South Carolina Highway 55, 1.5 miles southwest of its junction with County Road 2109; 34°53′25″N 80°51′37″W	Van Wyck	
13	Kershaw Depot	Kershaw Depot	February 16, 1990 (#90000096)	Cleveland St. 34°32′49″N 80°34′58″W	Kershaw	
14	Lancaster Cotton Oil Company	Lancaster Cotton Oil Company	February 6, 1990 (#89002145)	S. Main St. at the Lancaster and Chester railroad tracks 34°42′51″N 80°46′01″W	Lancaster	
15	Lancaster County Courthouse	Lancaster County Courthouse	February 24, 1971 (#71000788)	104 N. Main St. 34°43′09″N 80°46′27″W	Lancaster	
16	Lancaster County Jail	Lancaster County Jail	August 9, 1971 (#71000789)	208 W. Gay St. 34°43′09″N 80°46′19″W	Lancaster	
17	Lancaster Downtown Historic District	Lancaster Downtown Historic District	August 9, 1984 (#84002048)	S. Main, Gay, and Catawba Sts. 34°43′05″N 80°46′12″W	Lancaster	
18	Lancaster Presbyterian Church	Lancaster Presbyterian Church	December 16, 1977 (#77001228)	W. Gay St. 34°43′02″N 80°46′25″W	Lancaster	
19	Massey-Doby-Nisbet House	Massey-Doby-Nisbet House	February 16, 1990 (#90000095)	South Carolina Highway 55, southwest of County Road 2109; 34°52′51″N 80°51′47″W	Van Wyck	
20	Matson Street Historic District	Matson Street Historic District	September 4, 1990 (#89002143)	Matson St. from Hilton to Pine Sts. 34°32′53″N 80°35′08″W	Kershaw	
21	Mount Carmel A.M.E. Zion Campground	Mount Carmel A.M.E. Zion Campground	May 10, 1979 (#79002386)	South of Lancaster; 34°35′47″N 80°46′45″W	Lancaster	
22	North Carolina-South Carolina Cornerstone	North Carolina-South Carolina Cornerstone	December 20, 1984 (#84001115)	Off U.S. Route 521; 34°49′10″N 80°47′51″W	Lancaster	
23	Perry-McIlwain-McDow House	Perry-McIlwain-McDow House	September 8, 2011 (#11000650)	2297 Douglas Rd. 34°39′31″N 80°46′25″W	Lancaster vicinity	
24	William Harrison Sapp House	William Harrison Sapp House	January 4, 1990 (#89002141)	South Carolina Highways 51 and 522; 34°47′53″N 80°38′01″W	Tradesville	
25	Leroy Springs House	Leroy Springs House	March 20, 1986 (#86000467)	Catawba and Gay Sts. 34°43′05″N 80°45′37″W	Lancaster	
26	Unity Baptist Church	Unity Baptist Church	February 16, 1990 (#90000098)	Sumter and Hart Sts. 34°32′49″N 80°34′50″W	Kershaw	
27	Wade-Beckham House	Wade-Beckham House	June 17, 1988 (#88000669)	South Carolina Highway 200; 34°39′33″N 80°49′54″W	Lancaster	
28	Waxhaw Presbyterian Church Cemetery	Waxhaw Presbyterian Church Cemetery	September 11, 1975 (#75001701)	8 miles (13 km) north of Lancaster off U.S. Route 521; 34°47′20″N 80°50′52″W	Lancaster	
29	Whitfield Hotel		September 24, 2025 (#100012299)	118 East Marion Street; 34°32′54″N 80°34′54″W	Kershaw	

== Former listings ==
	Name on the Register	Image	Date listed	Date removed	Location	City or town	Description
1	Kilburnie		April 24, 1979 (#79002385)	December 8, 2005	204 North White Street	Lancaster	Delisted after being moved
2	Stewart-Sapp House		February 16, 1990 (#90000097)	March 15, 2005	South Carolina Highway 522 and South Carolina Highway 28	Tradesville	Burned down

== See also ==
- List of National Historic Landmarks in South Carolina
- National Register of Historic Places listings in South Carolina
