= Lancaster Historic District =

Lancaster Historic District may refer to, in the United States: (by state)

- Lancaster Commercial Historic District (Lancaster, Kentucky), Lancaster, Kentucky, listed on the National Register of Historic Places (NRHP)
- Lancaster Historic District (Lancaster, Ohio), NRHP-listed
- Lancaster Methodist Episcopal Camp Ground Historic District, Lancaster, Ohio, listed on the NRHP in Fairfield County, Ohio
- Lancaster West Main Street Historic District, Lancaster, Ohio, listed on the NRHP in Fairfield County, Ohio
- Lancaster City Historic District, Lancaster, Pennsylvania, listed on the NRHP in Lancaster, Pennsylvania
- Lancaster Historic District (Lancaster, Pennsylvania), listed on the NRHP in Lancaster, Pennsylvania
- Northeast Lancaster Township Historic District, Lancaster, Pennsylvania, listed on the NRHP in Lancaster, Pennsylvania
- Lancaster Downtown Historic District, Lancaster, South Carolina, listed on the NRHP in Lancaster County, South Carolina
- Lancaster Court House Historic District, Lancaster, Virginia, NRHP-listed
