= Unity, South Carolina =

- Census-designated place
- Location within South Carolina Location within the United States
- Coordinates: 34°48′08″N 80°41′37″W
- Country: United States
- State: South Carolina
- County: Lancaster

Area
  - Total: 2.12 sq mi (5.49 km^{2})
  - Land: 2.11 sq mi (5.47 km^{2})
  - Water: 0.0077 sq mi (0.02 km^{2})
- Elevation: 610 ft (190 m)

Population (2020)
  - Total: 325
  - Density: 153.7/sq mi (59.36/km^{2})
- Time zone: UTC-5 (Eastern (EST))
  - Summer (DST): UTC-4 (EDT)
- ZIP Code: 29720 (Lancaster)
- Area codes: 803/839
- FIPS code: 45-73240
- GNIS feature ID: 2812972

Unity is an unincorporated community and census-designated place (CDP) in Lancaster County, South Carolina, United States. It was first listed as a CDP prior to the 2020 census with a population of 325.

The CDP is in northern Lancaster County, 7 miles (11 km) northeast of Lancaster, the county seat, and 1 mile (1.6 km) south of the North Carolina border.

== Demographics ==
Historical population
Census	Pop.	Note	%±
2020	325		—
U.S. Decennial Census; 2020

Unity first appeared as a census designated place in the 2020 U.S. census.

=== 2020 census ===
Unity CDP, South Carolina – Demographic Profile (NH = Non-Hispanic)
Race / Ethnicity	Pop 2020	% 2020
White alone (NH)	274	84.31%
Black or African American alone (NH)	6	1.85%
Native American or Alaska Native alone (NH)	2	0.62%
Asian alone (NH)	0	0.00%
Pacific Islander alone (NH)	0	0.00%
Some Other Race alone (NH)	0	0.00%
Mixed Race/Multi-Racial (NH)	21	6.46%
Hispanic or Latino (any race)	22	6.77%
Total	325	100.00%

Note: the US Census treats Hispanic/Latino as an ethnic category. This table excludes Latinos from the racial categories and assigns them to a separate category. Hispanics/Latinos can be of any race.
