= Lancaster County Courthouse =

Lancaster County Courthouse may refer to a building in the United States:

- Lancaster County Courthouse (Pennsylvania)
- Lancaster County Courthouse (South Carolina)
