= Thomas Walker Huey House =

Historic house in South Carolina, United States

- U.S. National Register of Historic Places
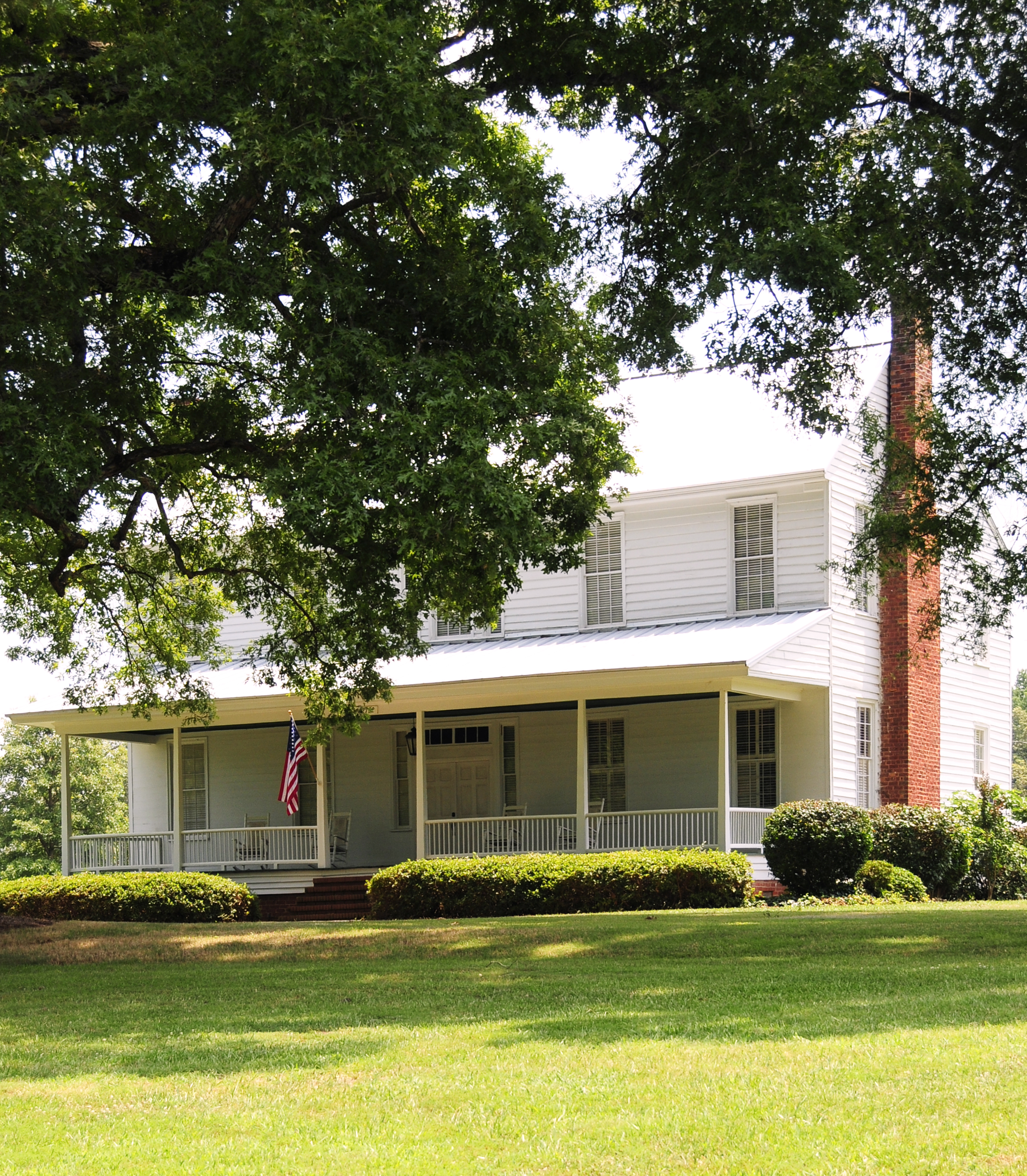
- Thomas Walker Huey House, July 2012

- Location within South Carolina Location within the United States
- Location: Junction of South Carolina Highways 200 and 285, near Lancaster, South Carolina
- Coordinates: 34°48′54″N 80°43′1″W
- Area: 2.4 acres (0.97 ha)
- Built: 1847-1848
- Architectural style: Greek Revival
- MPS: Lancaster County MPS
- NRHP reference No.: 89002146
- Added to NRHP: January 4, 1990

Thomas Walker Huey House is a historic home located near Lancaster, Lancaster County, South Carolina. It was built in 1847–1848, and is a simple, two-story, clapboard-sided, Greek Revival style dwelling . It has a full-façade one-story shed roof porch. Thomas Walker Huey (1798–1854) was a prominent 19th century merchant, planter, and politician.

It was added to the National Register of Historic Places in 1990.

== See also ==
- Leroy Springs House
