= Francis Bell (American politician) =

American politician (1943–2025)

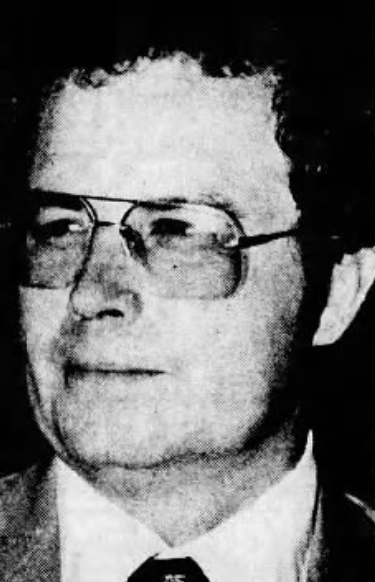
- Bell in 1979

Member of the South Carolina Senate from the 6th district
- In office 1983–1984

Personal details
- Born: May 21, 1943 Lancaster, South Carolina, U.S.
- Died: July 3, 2025 (aged 82)

Francis Laney Bell Jr. (May 21, 1943 – July 3, 2025) was an American politician who served in the South Carolina State Senate from 1983 to 1984, and was chairman of the Lancaster County Council. He died on July 3, 2025, at the age of 82.
