= William Harrison Sapp House =

Historic house in South Carolina, United States

- U.S. National Register of Historic Places
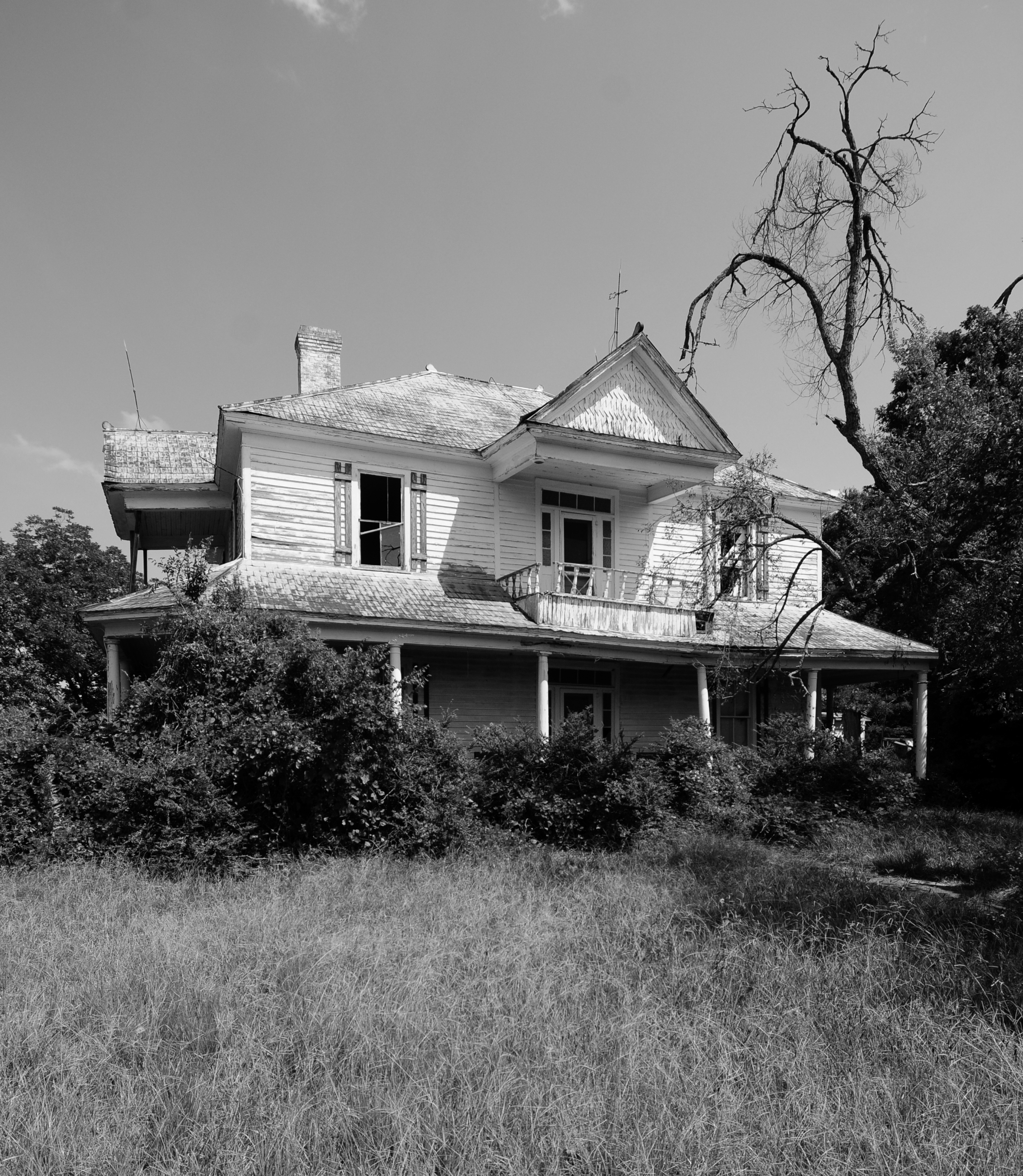
- William Harrison Sapp House, August 2012

- Location within South Carolina Location within the United States
- Location: South Carolina Highways 51 and 522, near Tradesville, South Carolina
- Coordinates: 34°47′53″N 80°38′1″W
- Area: 1 acre (0.40 ha)
- Built: c. 1897, 1912
- Architectural style: Colonial Revival
- MPS: Lancaster County MPS
- NRHP reference No.: 89002141
- Added to NRHP: January 4, 1990

William Harrison Sapp House is a historic home located near Tradesville, Lancaster County, South Carolina. It was built about 1897, and extensively remodeled in 1912. It is a two-story Colonial Revival style frame residence with a one-story rear projection. It features a one-story hipped-roof wraparound porch, supported by Tuscan order columns. A small one-story gable-front frame drug store/office built in 1912, is located on the property. Dr. William Harrison Sapp (1866-1946), was a prominent local physician and farmer.

It was added to the National Register of Historic Places in 1990.
