= Cureton House =

Historic house in South Carolina, United States

- U.S. National Register of Historic Places
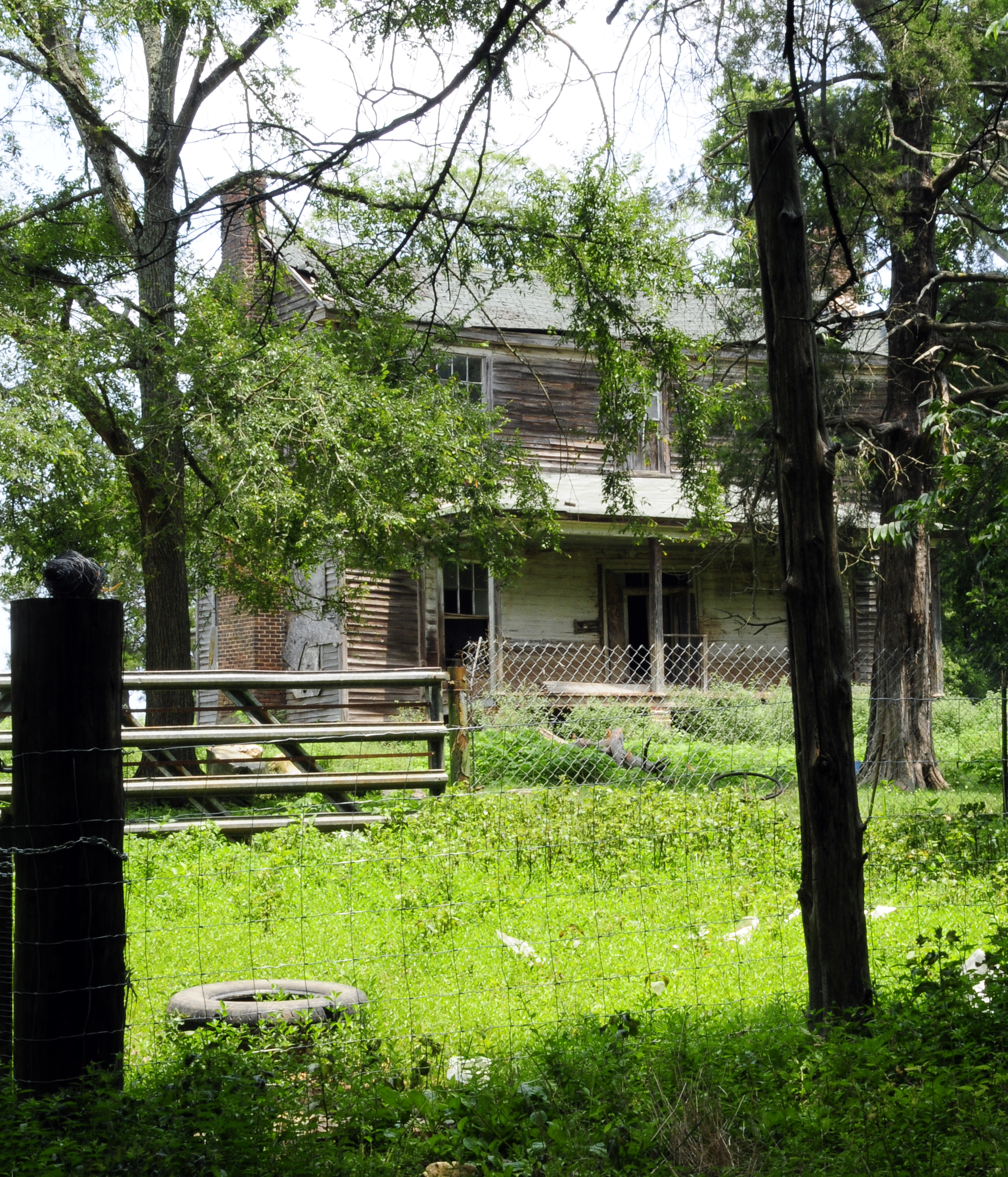
- Cureton House, July 2012

- Location within South Carolina Location within the United States
- Location: Co. Rd. 29, S of Co. Rd. 39, near Lancaster, South Carolina
- Coordinates: 34°48′29″N 80°51′2″W
- Area: 7.3 acres (3.0 ha)
- Built: c. 1840
- Architectural style: Greek Revival, Vernacular Greek Revival
- MPS: Lancaster County MPS
- NRHP reference No.: 90000094
- Added to NRHP: September 4, 1990

Cureton House is a historic home located near Lancaster, Lancaster County, South Carolina. It was built about 1840 and is a two-story, L-shaped, frame Greek Revival style residence with a central hall plan and two rooms in the rear ell. The property also includes a cotton shed (c. 1918), barn (c. 1930), and garage (c. 1930).

It was added to the National Register of Historic Places in 1990.

Unknown factors have led to the house falling into disrepair and it has completely fallen in. All that remains is a pile of rubble.
