= Tradesville, South Carolina =

- Census-designated place
- Location within South Carolina Location within the United States
- Coordinates: 34°46′14″N 80°32′55″W
- Country: United States
- State: South Carolina
- County: Lancaster

Area
  - Total: 2.01 sq mi (5.20 km^{2})
  - Land: 2.00 sq mi (5.17 km^{2})
  - Water: 0.012 sq mi (0.03 km^{2})
- Elevation: 525 ft (160 m)

Population (2020)
  - Total: 253
  - Density: 126.8/sq mi (48.94/km^{2})
- Time zone: UTC-5 (Eastern (EST))
  - Summer (DST): UTC-4 (EDT)
- ZIP Code: 29720 (Lancaster)
- Area codes: 803/839
- FIPS code: 45-72295
- GNIS feature ID: 2812970

Tradesville is an unincorporated community and census-designated place (CDP) in Lancaster County, South Carolina, United States. It was first listed as a CDP prior to the 2020 census with a population of 253.

The CDP is in northeastern Lancaster County, 5 miles (8 km) northeast of Buford, 14 miles (23 km) northeast of Lancaster, the county seat, and 10 miles (16 km) west of Pageland. The northeast edge of the CDP is the Lynches River, which forms the Chesterfield County line.

== Demographics ==
Historical population
Census	Pop.	Note	%±
2020	253		—
U.S. Decennial Census; 2020

Tradesville first appeared as a census designated place in the 2020 U.S. census.

=== 2020 census ===
Tradesville CDP, South Carolina – Demographic Profile (NH = Non-Hispanic)
Race / Ethnicity	Pop 2020	% 2020
White alone (NH)	216	85.38%
Black or African American alone (NH)	7	2.77%
Native American or Alaska Native alone (NH)	2	0.79%
Asian alone (NH)	0	0.00%
Pacific Islander alone (NH)	0	0.00%
Some Other Race alone (NH)	7	2.77%
Mixed Race/Multi-Racial (NH)	11	4.35%
Hispanic or Latino (any race)	10	3.95%
Total	253	100.00%

Note: the US Census treats Hispanic/Latino as an ethnic category. This table excludes Latinos from the racial categories and assigns them to a separate category. Hispanics/Latinos can be of any race.
