= Lancaster County Courthouse (South Carolina) =

- U.S. National Register of Historic Places
- U.S. National Historic Landmark
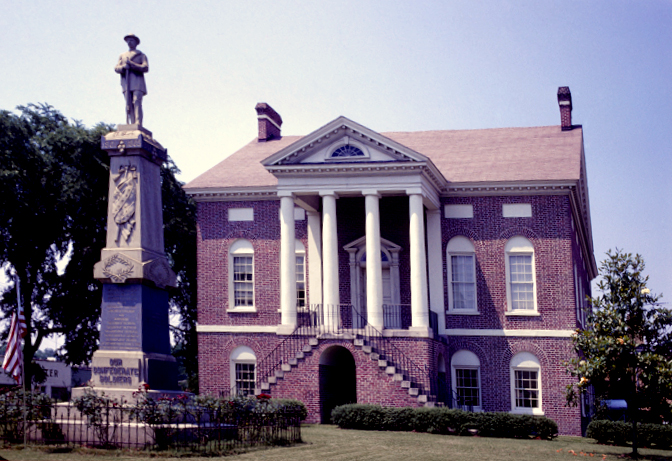
- Lancaster County Courthouse, 1969

- Location within South Carolina Location within the United States
- Interactive map showing the location of Lancaster County Courthouse
- Location: 104 N. Main St., Lancaster, South Carolina
- Coordinates: 34°43′9″N 80°46′27″W
- Built: 1828
- Architect: Robert Mills
- Architectural style: Classical Revival
- NRHP reference No.: 71000788

Significant dates
- Added to NRHP: February 24, 1971
- Designated NHL: November 7, 1973

Lancaster County Courthouse is a historic courthouse in Lancaster, South Carolina. Built in 1828, it has been in continuous use since then. It was designated a National Historic Landmark in 1973, as a possible work of Robert Mills, an important American architect of the first half of the 19th century. It also has the distinction of being the site of the last witch trials to take place in the United States.

== Description and history ==
The Lancaster County Courthouse is located in the heart of downtown Lancaster, at the southwest corner of Meeting Street (South Carolina Highway 9) and Main Street (U.S. Route 521). It is a two-story masonry structure, built out of locally made bricks laid in English bond, with Flemish bond around the windows. Its main facade is five bays wide, with the main entrance on the second floor, accessed via stairs on either side of a projecting classical temple front supported by Tuscan columns. Windows are rectangular, set in round-arch openings. The interior of the ground floor has barrel-vaulted ceilings, providing support for the upper floor. The judge's bench in the main courtroom is a particularly fine example of Federal period wood carving.

The courthouse was built in 1828 by Willis Alsobrook, and its design has been attributed, without conclusive evidence, to the architect Robert Mills, who is known to have designed the old 1823 county jail, also a National Historic Landmark. The building had been in continuous use as a courthouse until 2012, when the new county courthouse, located adjacent to it, was completed.

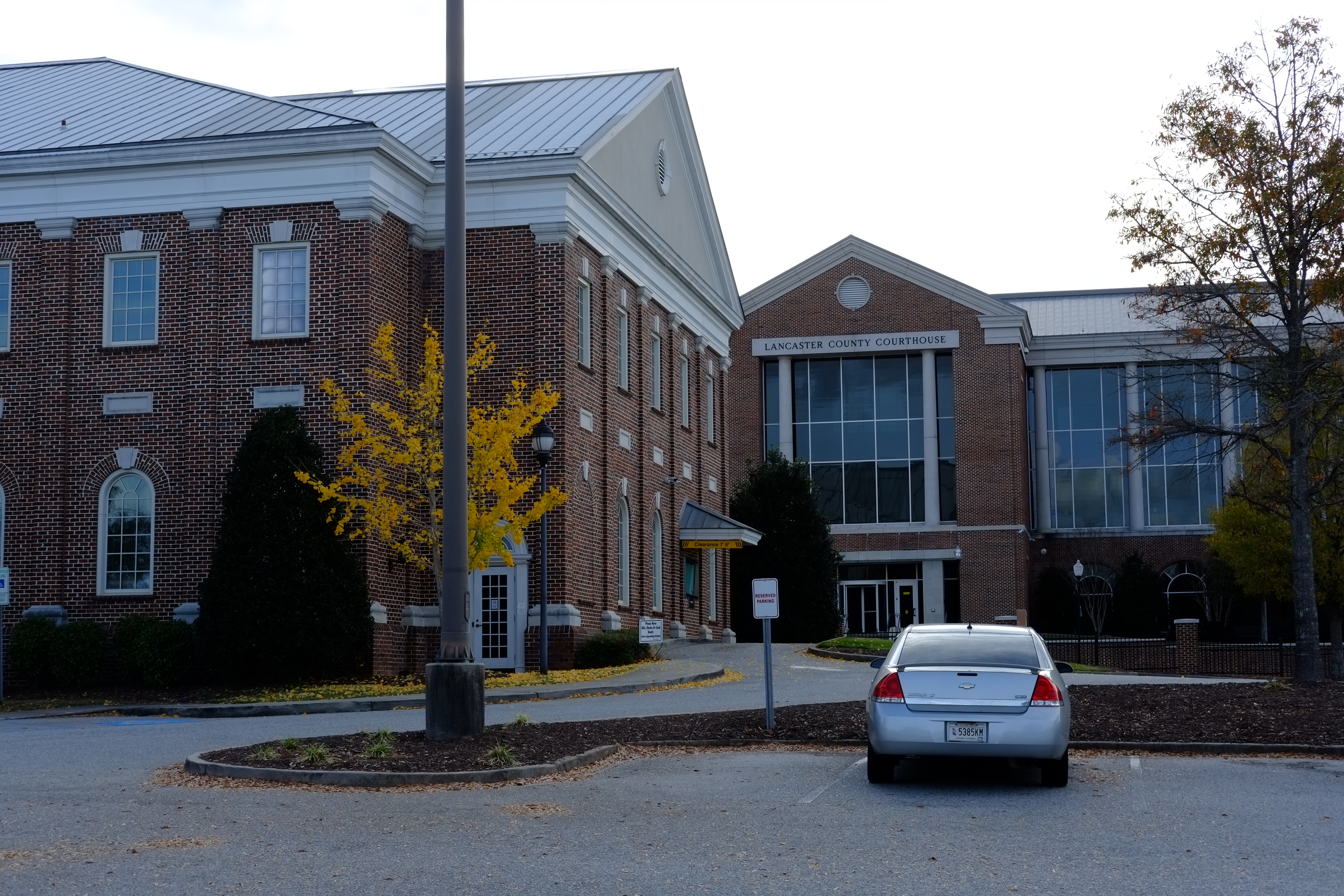
New Lancaster County Courthouse, adjacent to the original, 2022

In 2008, the courthouse was heavily damaged, but not destroyed, by fire caused by arson. It was fully restored in 2011 and turned into a museum. In April 2010, a local 18-year-old, Martavious Carter, was sentenced to 35 years in prison for the arson of the courthouse and other crimes.

== See also ==
- List of National Historic Landmarks in South Carolina
- National Register of Historic Places listings in Lancaster County, South Carolina
