= Lancaster Presbyterian Church =

Historic church in South Carolina, United States

- U.S. National Register of Historic Places
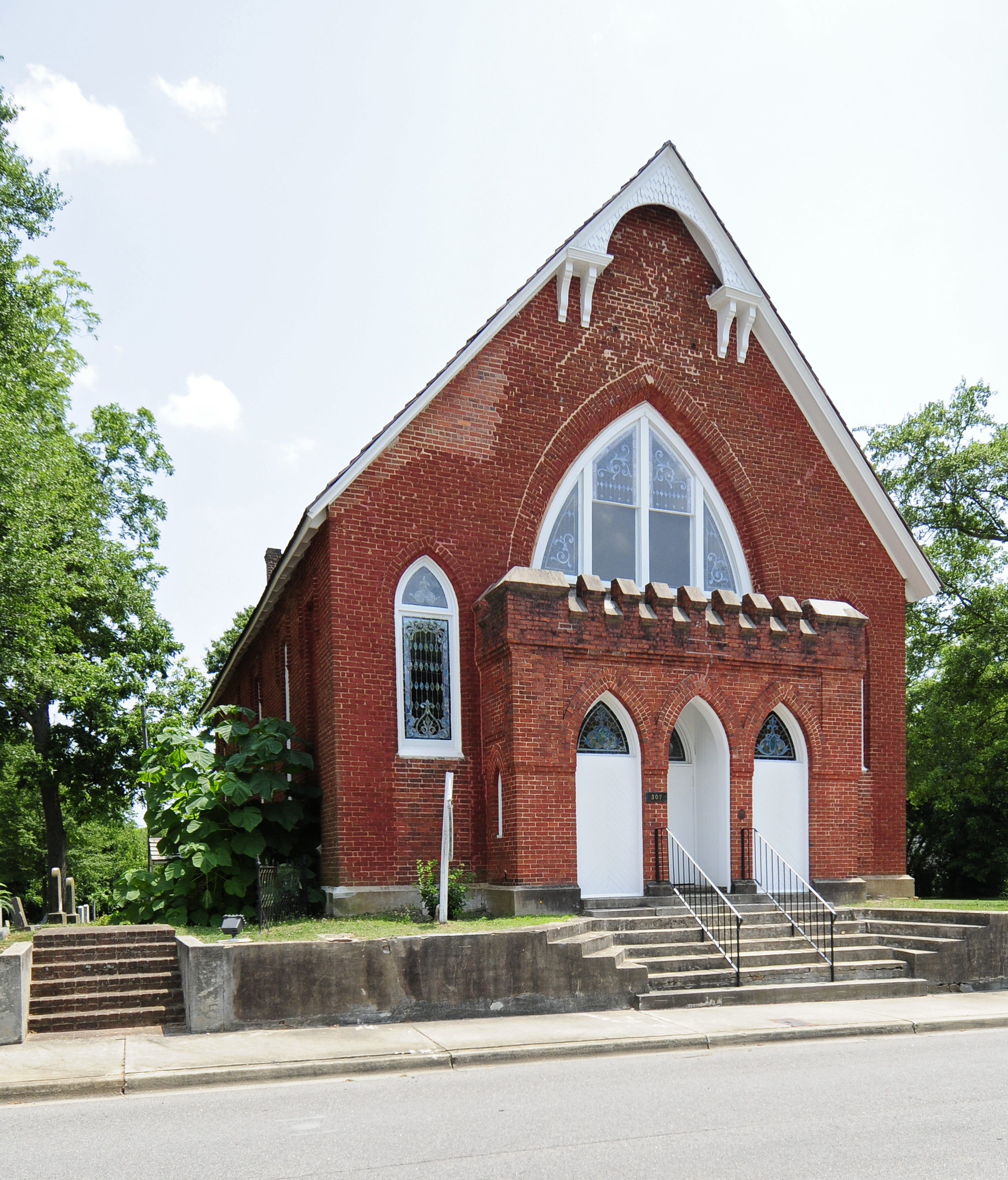
- Lancaster Presbyterian Church, July 2012

- Location within South Carolina Location within the United States
- Location: W. Gay St., Lancaster, South Carolina
- Coordinates: 34°43′2″N 80°46′25″W
- Area: 4 acres (1.6 ha)
- Built: 1860-1862
- Architect: Retting, Sidney
- Architectural style: Gothic Revival, Early Gothic Revival
- NRHP reference No.: 77001228
- Added to NRHP: December 16, 1977

Lancaster Presbyterian Church, also known as The Old Presbyterian Church and Cemetery, is a historic Presbyterian church on W. Gay Street in Lancaster, Lancaster County, South Carolina. It was built in 1860-1862 and is a brick, Basilican plan church. The interior walls are stuccoed and scored to resemble stone. It is thought to have been the first brick church in Lancaster County. It was purchased in 1976 by the Lancaster County Society for Historical Preservation, Inc.

It was added to the National Register of Historic Places in 1977.
