= Pep Harris =

American baseball player (born 1972)

- Pitcher
- Born: September 23, 1972 (age 53); Lancaster, South Carolina, U.S.
- Batted: Right Threw: Right

MLB debut
- August 14, 1996, for the California Angels

Last MLB appearance
- September 27, 1998, for the Anaheim Angels

MLB statistics
- Win–loss record: 10–5
- Earned run average: 3.92
- Strikeouts: 110
- Stats at Baseball Reference

Teams
- California / Anaheim Angels (1996–1998)

Hernando Petrocelli "Pep" Harris (born September 23, 1972) is an American former professional baseball pitcher. He played in Major League Baseball (MLB) for the California/Anaheim Angels from 1996 to 1998.

== Career ==
In the seventh round of the 1991 draft, the Cleveland Indians chose Harris, then a recent graduate of Lancaster High School in Lancaster, South Carolina. He was a replacement player during the 1994–95 Major League Baseball strike, pitching in one inning of one game during spring training in 1995. He spent that season in class AA, and on February 15, 1996, the Indians traded Harris and pitcher Jason Grimsley to the California Angels for pitcher Brian Anderson.

On August 5, Harris started in the Hall of Fame game, giving up three runs in seven innings against the Expos, and on August 14 he was called up to the Angels, taking the roster spot of Jim Abbott. He made his major league debut that night against the Indians, pitching 2 1/3 scoreless innings and striking out three batters in an 8-7 win for the Angels. Harris would go on to spend three seasons with the Angels, chiefly as a relief pitcher. From 1996 through 1998, he earned 10 wins and five losses in 121 games pitched, posting a 3.92 ERA in 172 innings pitched. Due to his work as a replacement player, however, he was not allowed to join the Major League Baseball Players Association (MLBPA). Angels player representative Troy Percival argued in favor of Harris's reinstatement for 30 minutes in front of the union's executive board, but was unsuccessful.

After the end of the 1998 season, the Angels asked Harris to play for the Lara Cardinals of the Venezuelan Professional Baseball League during the offseason. While playing there, he damaged a tendon in his right elbow, which required surgery and knocked him out for the entire 1999 season. He went to spring training with the Pittsburgh Pirates in 2000, but was hampered by a bone spur which required more surgery.

In 2002, Harris attempted a comeback with the Amarillo Dillas of the independent Texas–Louisiana League, in the dual roles of pitcher and pitching coach. He was one of four Dillas selected to the Texas–Louisiana league All-Star team that season, along with teammates Jorge Alvarez, Tyrone Horne, and Lonnie Maclin.

== Personal life ==
Harris's nickname "Pep" was a derivative of his middle name, Petrocelli. His family had wanted a shorter name to use when referring to him, but they felt that "Pet" would be inappropriate, and thus they changed it to "Pep".

As of 2002, Harris was married, with two children. His cousin Danny Clyburn was also a professional baseball player, spending two years with the Baltimore Orioles and the Tampa Bay Devil Rays.
