= Lancaster Cotton Oil Company =

- U.S. National Register of Historic Places
- U.S. Historic district
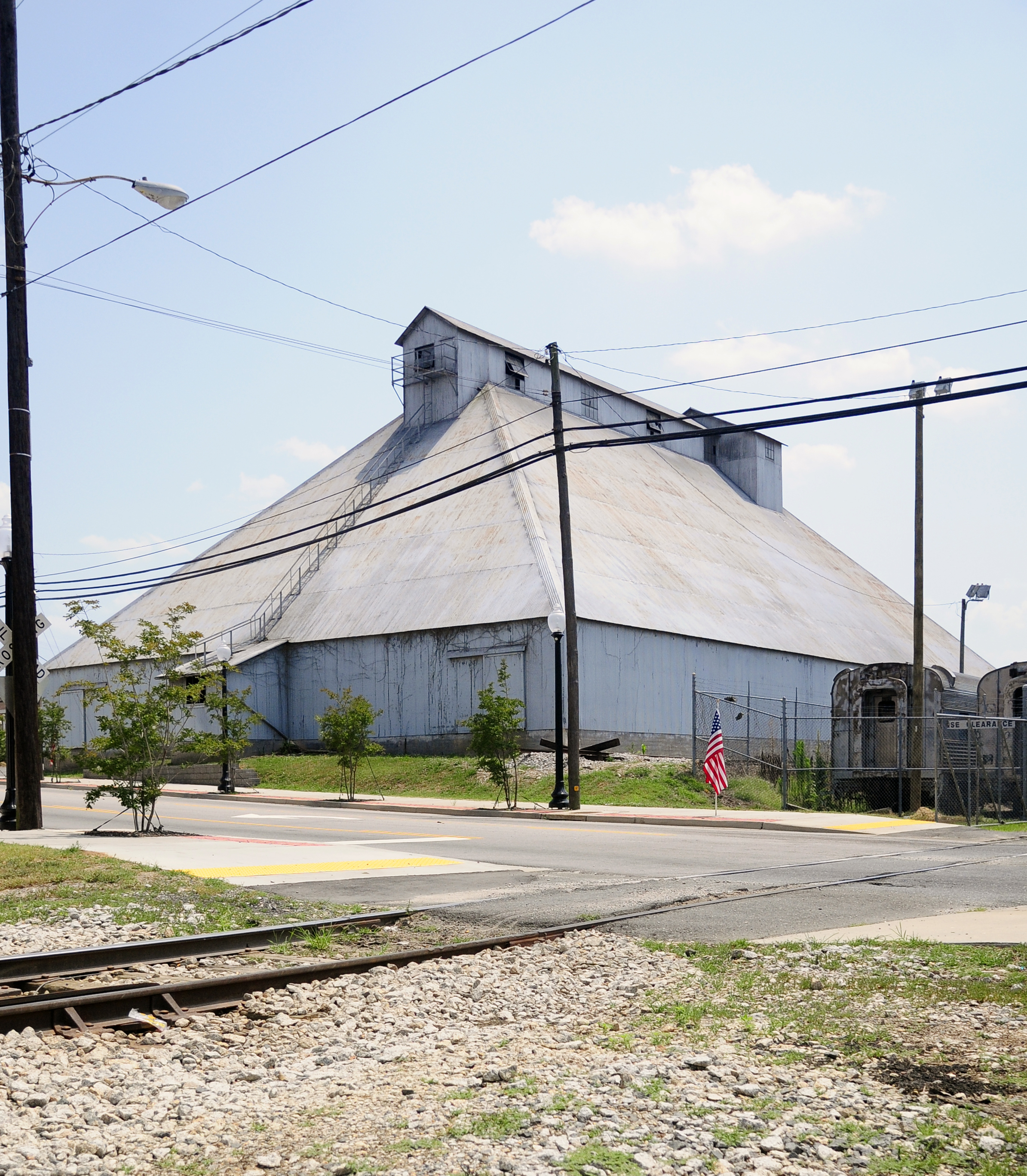
- Lancaster Cotton Oil Company, July 2012

- Location within South Carolina Location within the United States
- Location: S. Main St. at Lancaster & Chester Railroad tracks, Lancaster, South Carolina
- Coordinates: 34°42′51″N 80°46′1″W
- Area: 1.3 acres (0.53 ha)
- MPS: Lancaster County MPS
- NRHP reference No.: 89002145
- Added to NRHP: February 6, 1990

Lancaster Cotton Oil Company is a historic factory complex and national historic district located at Lancaster, Lancaster County, South Carolina. It encompasses five contributing buildings and six contributing structures associated with the Lancaster Cotton Oil Company established in 1907. The Lancaster Cotton Oil Company office and seed house burned in 1913 and were replaced as the company continued to grow. After the post-World War I decline the Lancaster and Kershaw cotton oil mills were among South Carolina's larger and more centrally located mills which survived into the 1930s and 1940s. Contributing resources include the Seed and Hull House (1937), Cotton Seed Processing Plant (1907), Oil Storage Tanks and Shed (1907), Cotton Gin (1907), and an office (1907).

It was added to the National Register of Historic Places in 1984.
