= Wade-Beckham House =

Historic house in South Carolina, United States

- U.S. National Register of Historic Places
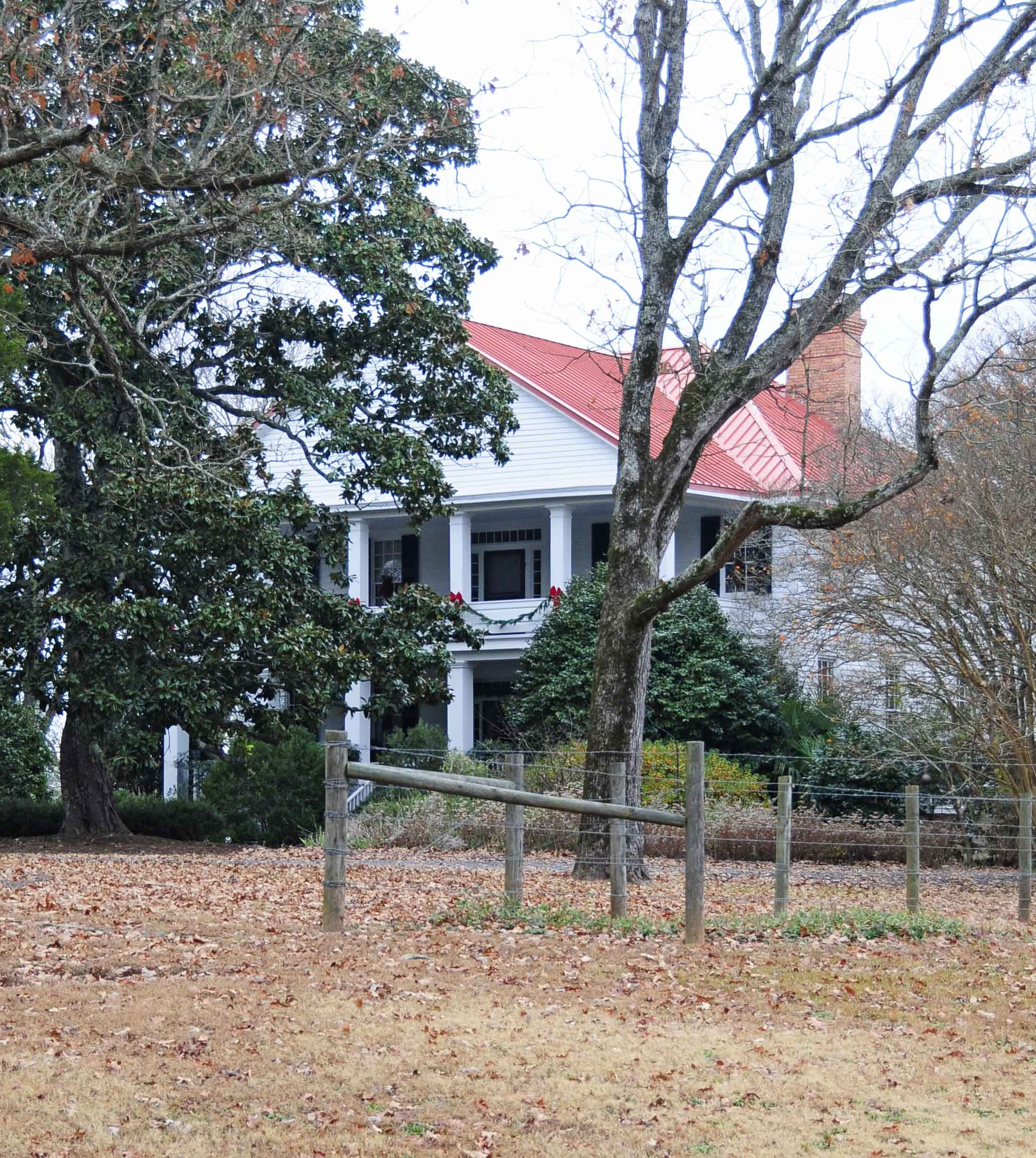
- Wade-Beckham House, December 2012

- Location within South Carolina Location within the United States
- Location: South Carolina Highway 200, near Lancaster, South Carolina
- Coordinates: 34°39′33″N 80°49′54″W
- Area: 20 acres (8.1 ha)
- Built: 1845
- Architectural style: Greek Revival
- NRHP reference No.: 88000669
- Added to NRHP: June 17, 1988

Wade-Beckham House, also known as Beckham House, is a historic home located near Lancaster, Lancaster County, South Carolina. It was built ca 1832 and is a two-story frame residence, in a blend of Greek Revival and Neo-Classical styles. Originally one room deep, the structure was doubled in size in 1916. The original porch on the front remains basically intact. A one-story kitchen wing and porch on the rear of the structure were part of the 1916 addition. Also on the property are a contributing small wooden store and a barn.

It was added to the National Register of Historic Places in 1988.
