= Bill Belk =

American football player (born 1946)

No. 72
- Positions: Defensive end, Defensive tackle

Personal information
- Born: February 19, 1946 (age 80); Lancaster, South Carolina, U.S.
- Listed height: 6 ft 3 in (1.91 m)
- Listed weight: 253 lb (115 kg)

Career information
- High school: Barr St. (Lancaster)
- College: Maryland Eastern Shore
- NFL draft: 1968: 6th round, 153rd overall pick

Career history
- San Francisco 49ers (1968–1974); Toronto Argonauts (1975–1976)

Career NFL statistics
- Interceptions: 1
- Fumble recoveries: 4
- Touchdowns: 1
- Sacks: 16
- Stats at Pro Football Reference

William Arthur Belk (born February 19, 1946) is an American former professional football defensive lineman in the National Football League (NFL). He was selected by the San Francisco 49ers in the sixth round of the 1968 NFL/AFL draft. He played college football for the Maryland Eastern Shore Hawks. He played for the Toronto Argonauts in the Canadian Football League (CFL) in 1975 and 1976. He played a total of 9 years of professional football.

Belk was inducted into the University of Maryland Eastern-Shore Hall of Fame in 1984. His collegiate career spanned from 1964 to 1968. In college, Belk was a two-way starter at offensive and defensive end. He received All-Conference honors in 1966 and 1967, and was co-captain of the team his senior year. While in college, Belk was a student athlete, making the honor roll and dean’s list. He graduated in 1968, earning a bachelor's degree in Business Education.

In the NFL, Belk proved to be a versatile, reliable, and very intelligent football player, starting at both defensive end and tackle. One of his coaches, Dick Nolan, made this testimony in reference to Belk, “What I like about Bill is that he's very smart. He knows exactly what he's doing out there and can adjust to any situation."

== Professional career ==
=== San Francisco 49ers (1968–1974) ===
Belk made an impact in his rookie season when he stepped up for Kevin Hardy after he went down with a right knee sprain. By his third season with the team, despite suffering some injuries early in his career, he was seen as an integral part of the team, coming off the bench. In 1975, he was waived by the 49ers.

=== Toronto Argonauts ===
In 1975, Belk joined the Toronto Argonauts in the Canadian Football League.
