= Perry-McIlwain-McDow House =

Historic house in South Carolina, United States

- U.S. National Register of Historic Places
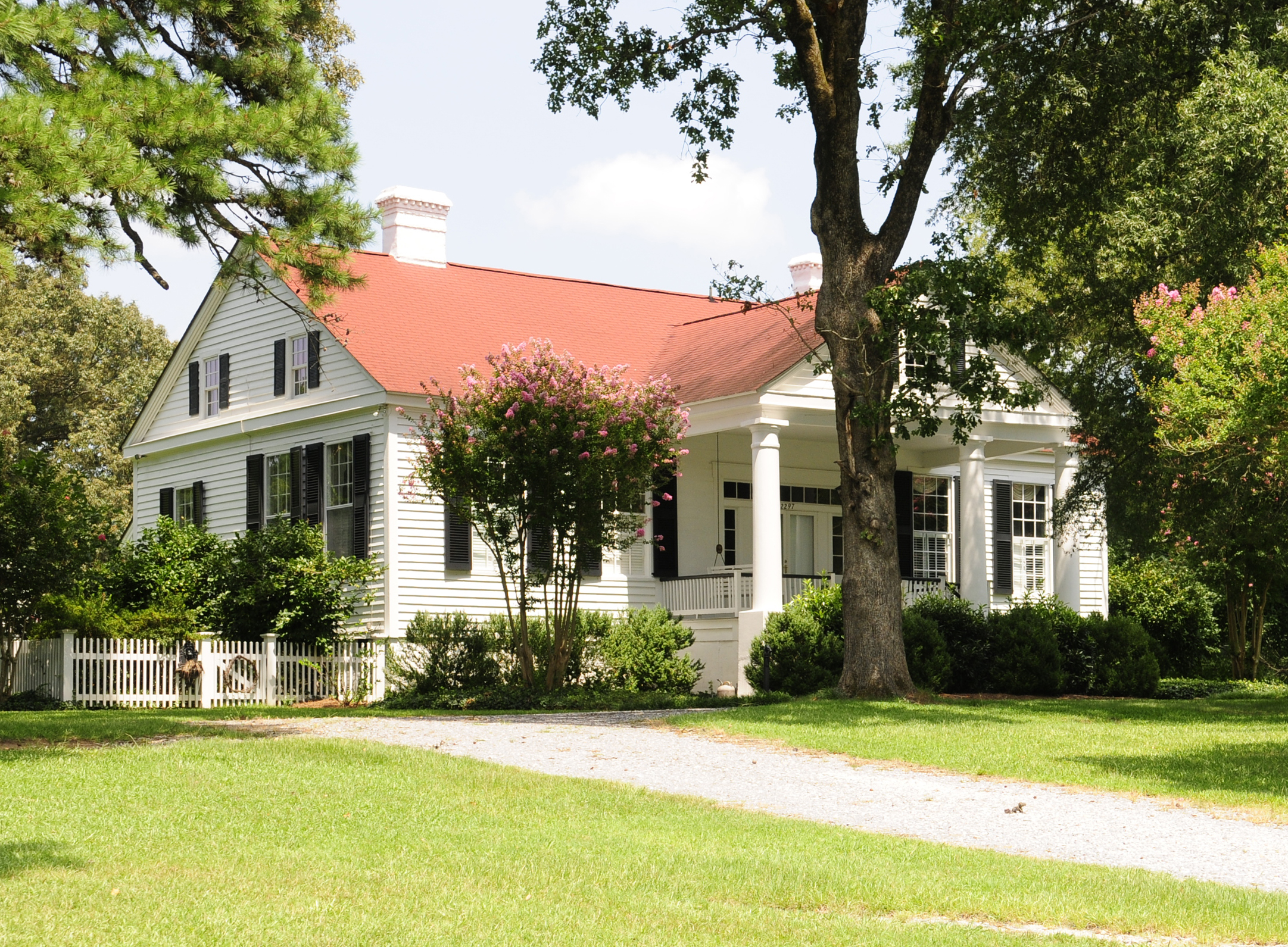
- Perry-McIlwain-McDow House, August 2012

- Location within South Carolina Location within the United States
- Location: 2297 Douglas Rd., near Lancaster, South Carolina
- Coordinates: 34°39′41″N 80°46′25″W
- Area: 2.98 acres (1.21 ha)
- Built: c. 1840
- Architectural style: Greek Revival
- MPS: Lancaster County MPS
- NRHP reference No.: 11000650
- Added to NRHP: September 8, 2011

Perry-McIlwain-McDow House, also known as Fairview Farm, is a historic home located near Lancaster, Lancaster County, South Carolina. It was built about 1840, and is a 1 1/2-story, Greek Revival raised cottage. It has a temple-front classical portico containing a recessed porch with balustrade.

It was added to the National Register of Historic Places in 2011.
