= North Carolina-South Carolina Cornerstone =

- U.S. National Register of Historic Places
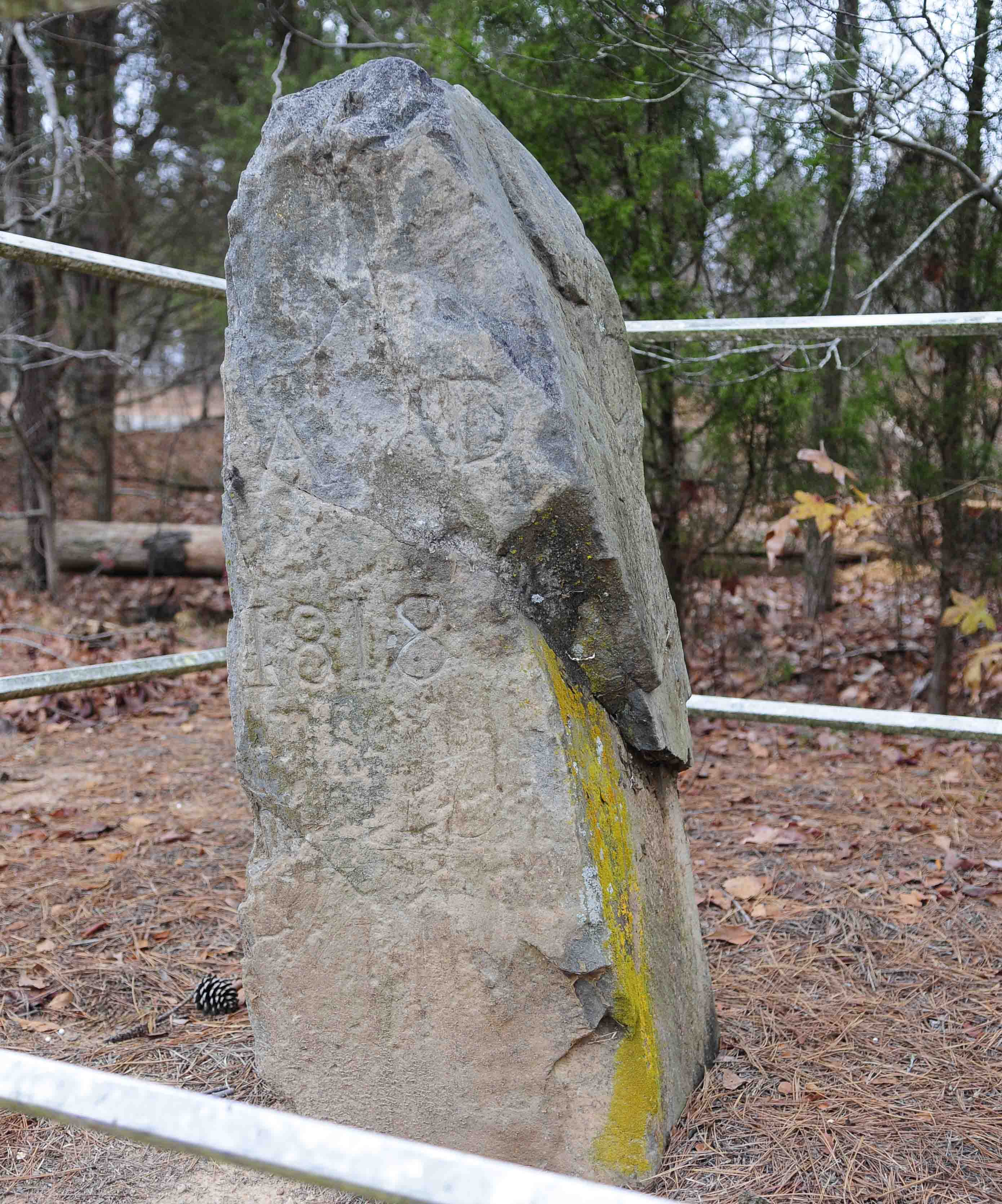
- North Carolina-South Carolina Cornerstone, December 2012

- Location within North Carolina Location within South Carolina Location within the United States
- Location: Off U.S. Route 521, near Lancaster, South Carolina
- Coordinates: 34°49′10″N 80°47′51″W
- Area: 0.1 acres (0.040 ha)
- Built: 1813
- NRHP reference No.: 84001115
- Added to NRHP: December 20, 1984

North Carolina-South Carolina Cornerstone is a historic boundary marker located near Lancaster, Lancaster County, South Carolina. It was erected in 1813, and is located on the boundary between Lancaster County, South Carolina and Union County, North Carolina. The cornerstone was erected by commissioners appointed by the two states to survey the boundary between the western termination of the boundary line which had been run in 1764 and to the southeast corner of Catawba lands. The cornerstone is an uneven, rectangular, upright metamorphosed igneous stone marker approximately two feet high. The top part of the cornerstone, which contains the engraved notations, "N.C." and "S.C." was broken off when a car hit the marker in 1977. On the portion of the stone remaining at the original site can be seen "A.D. 1818."

It was added to the National Register of Historic Places in 1984.
