= Robert Barnwell Allison House =

Historic house in South Carolina, United States

- U.S. National Register of Historic Places
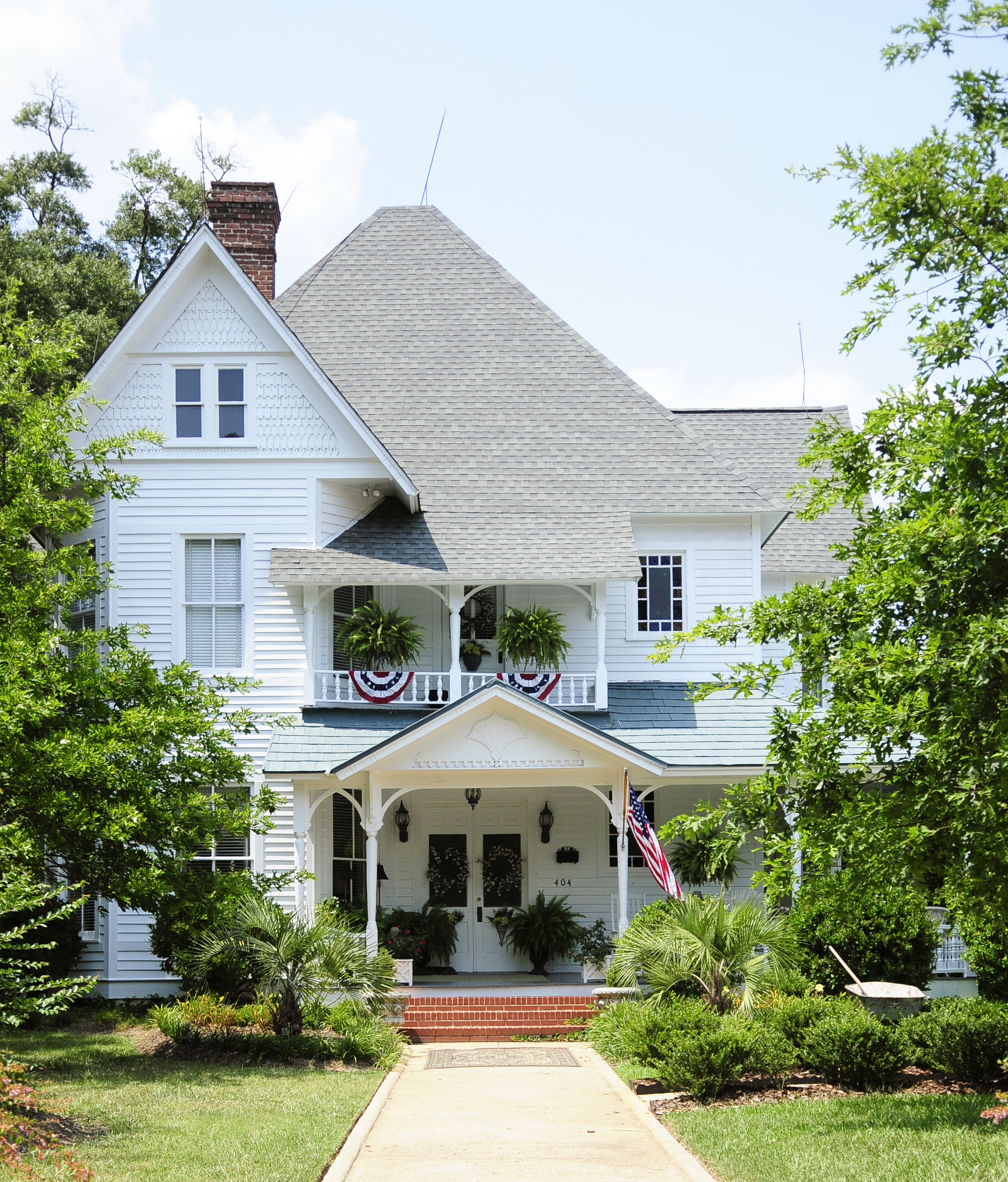
- Robert Barnwell Allison House, July 2012

- Location within South Carolina Location within the United States
- Location: 404 Chesterfield Ave., Lancaster, South Carolina
- Coordinates: 34°43′2″N 80°45′43″W
- Area: 0.5 acres (0.20 ha)
- Built: 1897
- Architect: Langley & White
- Architectural style: Queen Anne
- MPS: Lancaster County MPS
- NRHP reference No.: 89002148
- Added to NRHP: January 4, 1990

Robert Barnwell Allison House is a historic home located at Lancaster, Lancaster County, South Carolina. It was built in 1897, and is a rectangular, two-story, frame clapboard covered Queen Anne style dwelling. It has a tall, hipped roof with intersecting gables and diamond novelty shingle covered gable ends.

It was added to the National Register of Historic Places in 1990.
