= Leroy Springs House =

Historic house in South Carolina, United States

- U.S. National Register of Historic Places
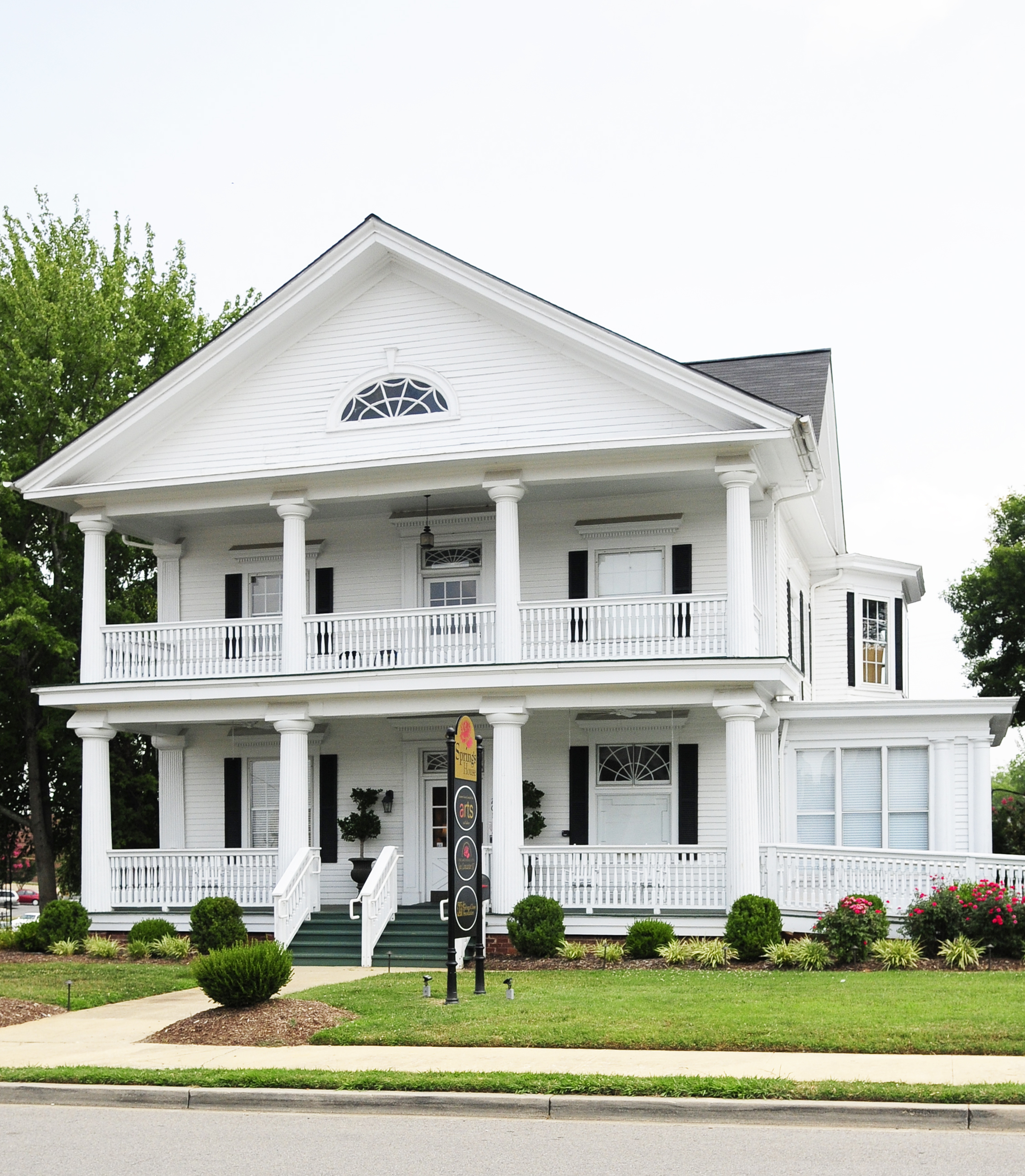
- Leroy Springs House, July 2012

- Location within South Carolina Location within the United States
- Location: Catawba and Gay Sts., Lancaster, South Carolina
- Coordinates: 34°43′5″N 80°45′37″W
- Area: 0.7 acres (0.28 ha)
- Built: c. 1820-1850, c. 1857, c. 1906-1907
- Built by: Unknown; McMichael, James M.
- NRHP reference No.: 86000467
- Added to NRHP: March 20, 1986

Leroy Springs House, also known as Lancaster City Hall, is a historic home located at Lancaster, Lancaster County, South Carolina. The original section was built in 1820–30. The house was greatly enlarged in the mid-1850s and it took its present appearance in a 1906-07 remodeling. It is a two-story, frame residence. The façade features a two-tiered pedimented portico defined by fluted columns with Doric order-influenced capitals. The building was converted to municipal use as a city hall in 1957.

It was added to the National Register of Historic Places in 1986.
