= Lancaster Downtown Historic District =

Historic district in South Carolina, United States

- U.S. National Register of Historic Places
- U.S. Historic district
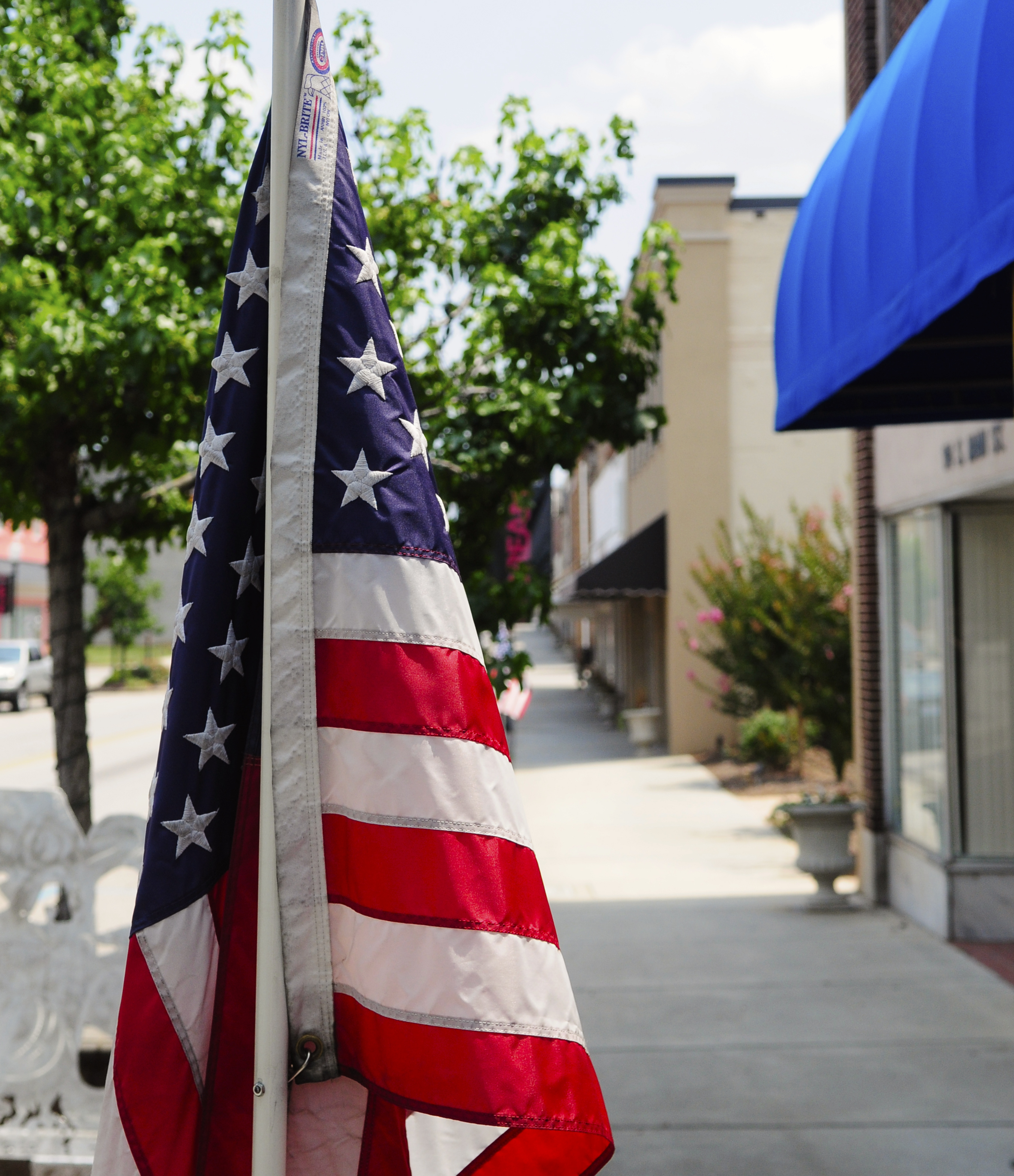
- Flag in the Lancaster Downtown Historic District, July 2012

- Location within South Carolina Location within the United States
- Location: S. Main, Gay, and Catawba Sts., Lancaster, South Carolina
- Coordinates: 34°43′05″N 80°46′12″W
- Area: 4.5 acres (1.8 ha)
- NRHP reference No.: 84002048
- Added to NRHP: August 9, 1984

Lancaster Downtown Historic District is a national historic district located at Lancaster, Lancaster County, South Carolina. It encompasses 12 contributing commercial buildings in central business district of Lancaster. The buildings date from about 1880 to 1935. It is the most intact section of Lancaster's early business area. Notable building include the United States Post Office, the Springs Block, the Farmers’ Bank and Trust Company Building, and the Bank of Lancaster/Opera House.

It was added to the National Register of Historic Places in 1984.
