= Lancaster Historic District (Lancaster, Ohio) =

Historic district in Ohio, United States

- U.S. National Register of Historic Places
- U.S. Historic district
- Location within Ohio Location within the United States
- Location: Roughly bounded by 5th Ave., Penn Central RR tracks, OH 33 and Tennant St., Lancaster, Ohio
- Coordinates: 39°42′49″N 82°35′54″W
- Architectural style: Mid 19th Century Revival, Italianate
- NRHP reference No.: 83003438
- Added to NRHP: August 11, 1983

Lancaster Historic District is a historic district in Lancaster, Ohio. It was listed on the National Register of Historic Places in 1983.

The Lancaster historic district includes the historic central business district of Lancaster, including most of the original town as laid out in 1800. It includes two previously existing local historic districts: the West Main Street Historic District and the Square 13 Historic District. The district contains numerous historic homes and buildings that were built in more than a dozen diverse architectural styles. Several museum houses are located within the district including the Sherman House Museum, The Georgian Museum, and the Decorative Arts Center of Ohio housed in the Reese-Peters mansion.

== Gallery ==
Lancaster Historic District Contributing Buildings

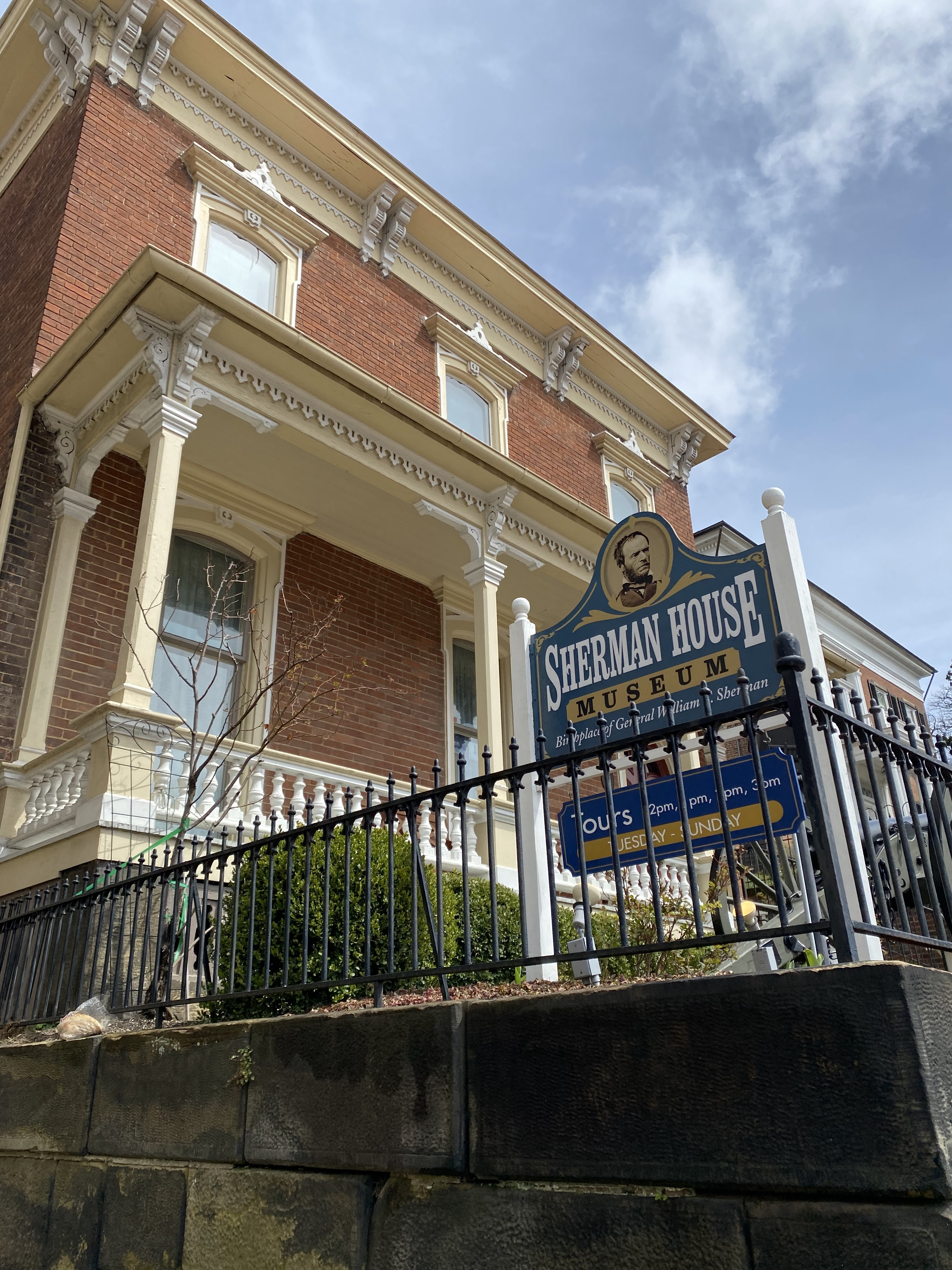
Sherman House Museum - Built in 1811, this house was the birthplace and childhood home of Civil War General William Tecumseh Sherman and US Senator John Sherman.

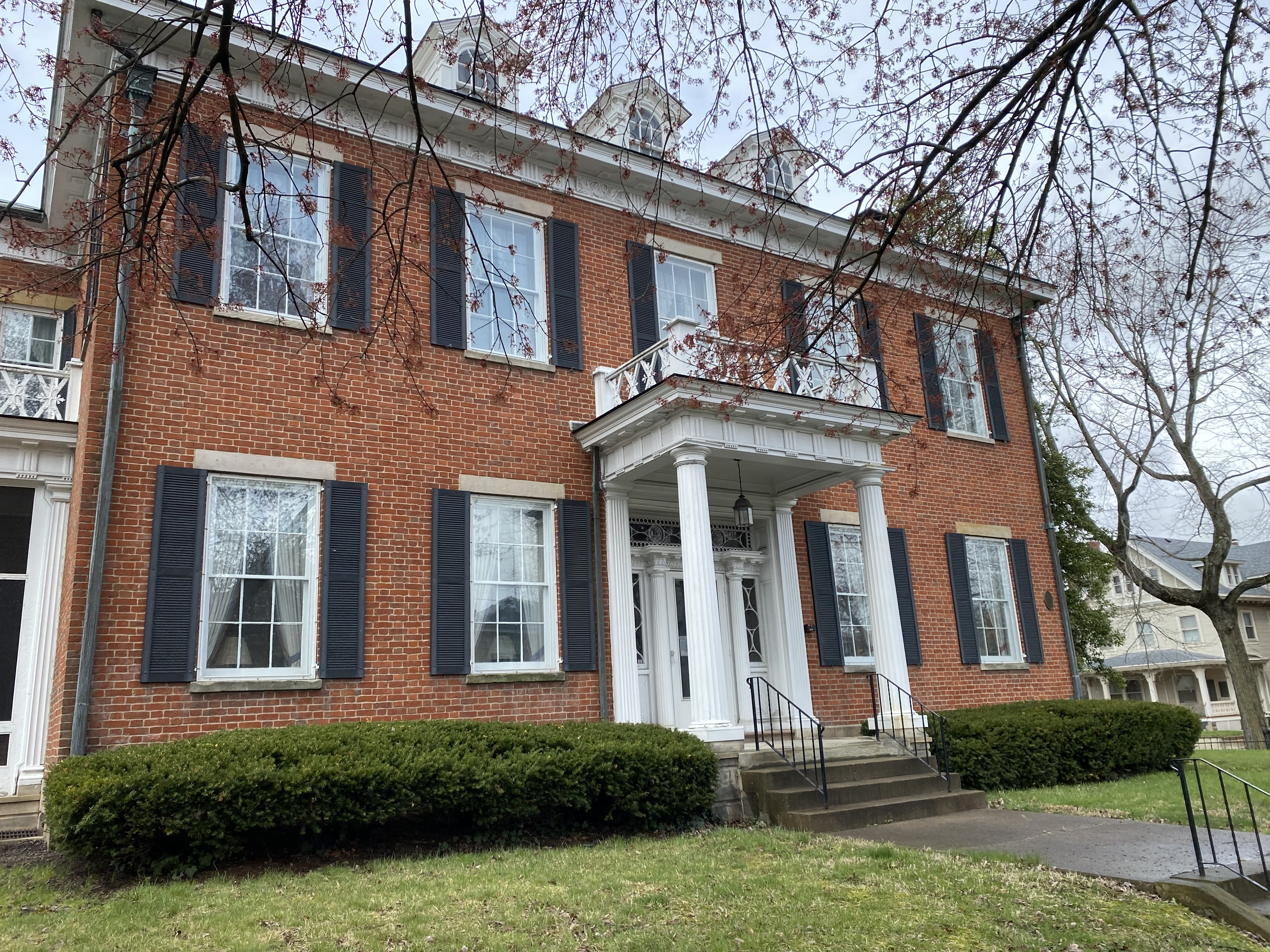
Henry Stanbery House - Built about 1835 for Henry Stanbery, law partner of Thomas Ewing. Stanbery was the first Attorney General of the State of Ohio. Stanbery later served as U.S. Attorney General in the Andrew Johnson administration.

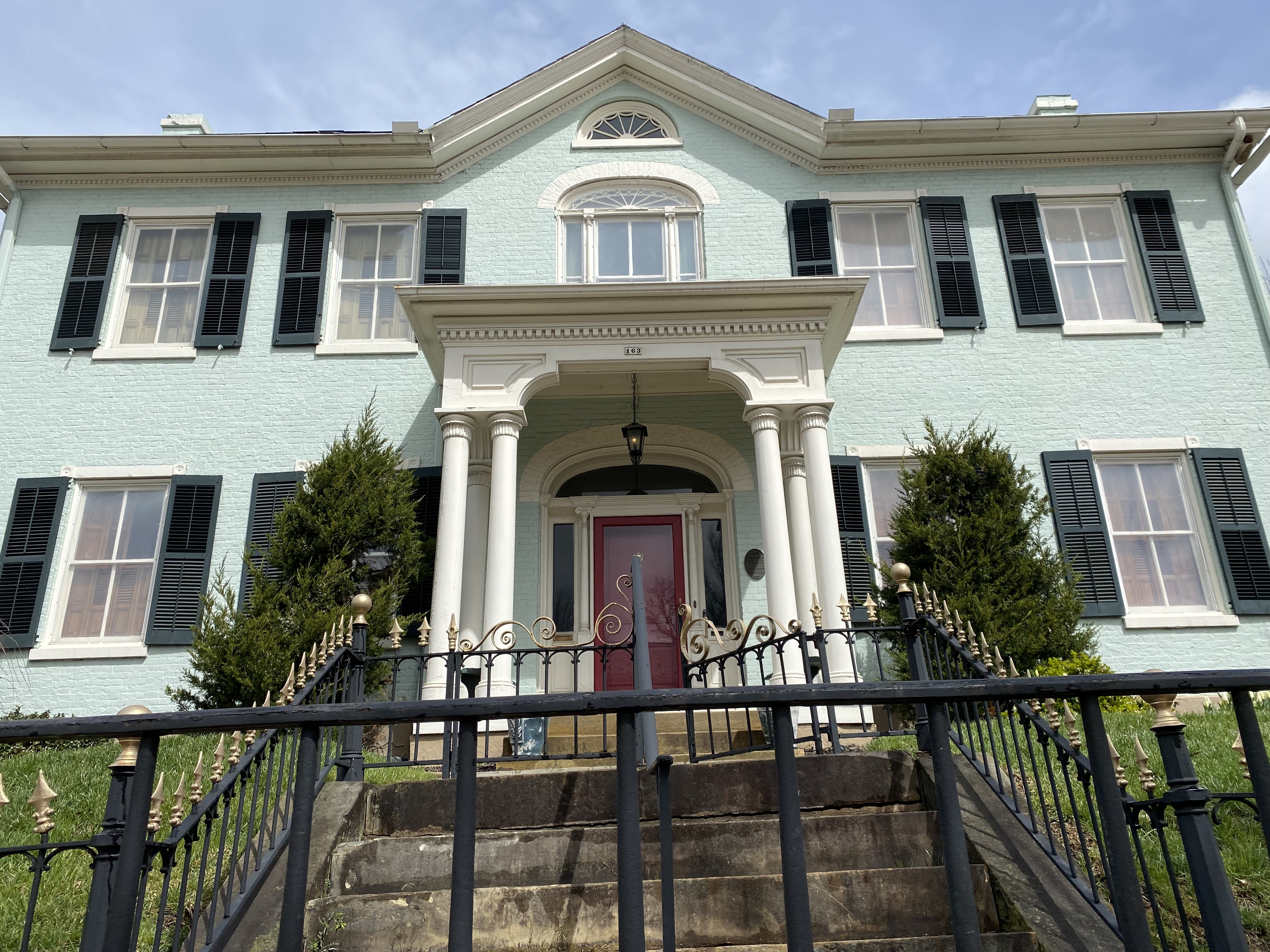
Ewing House - Built in 1824 for US Senator Thomas Ewing. Ewing later served as Secretary of the Treasury and Secretary of the Interior for several US presidents. He was also foster father to future Civil War General William T. Sherman.

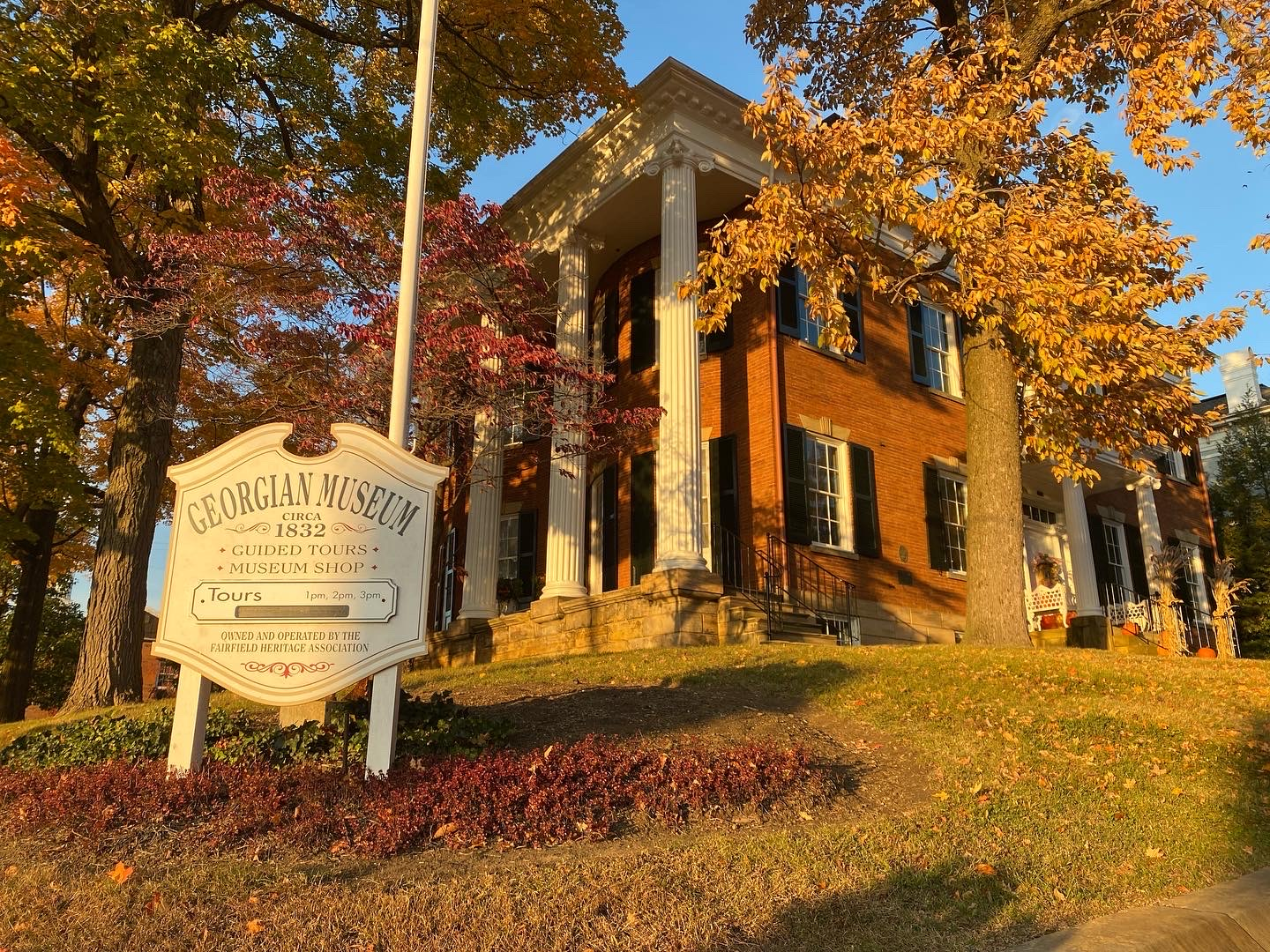
Georgian Museum - This Federal-style mansion was built by renowned Architect Daniel Sifford for entrepreneur Samuel & Sarah Maccracken in 1832. It now serves as a museum and houses the offices of the Fairfield County Heritage Association.
