= Danny Clyburn =

American baseball player (1974–2012)

- Clyburn with the Pittsburgh Pirates, 1994 Bowman baseball card
- Outfielder
- Born: April 6, 1974; Lancaster, South Carolina, U.S.
- Died: February 7, 2012 (aged 37); Lancaster, South Carolina, U.S.
- Batted: Right Threw: Right

MLB debut
- September 15, 1997, for the Baltimore Orioles

Last MLB appearance
- June 2, 1999, for the Tampa Bay Devil Rays

MLB statistics
- Batting average: .211
- Home runs: 4
- Runs batted in: 8
- Stats at Baseball Reference

Teams
- Baltimore Orioles (1997–1998); Tampa Bay Devil Rays (1999)

Danny Clyburn Jr. (April 6, 1974 – February 7, 2012) was an American professional baseball outfielder. He played in Major League Baseball (MLB) for the Baltimore Orioles and Tampa Bay Devil Rays.

== Career ==
Clyburn was drafted by the Pittsburgh Pirates in the second round of the 1992 amateur draft. He is the cousin of former Anaheim Angels pitcher Pep Harris. Clyburn was traded from Baltimore to Tampa Bay prior to the 1999 season for pitcher Jason Johnson.

== Death ==
Clyburn was shot dead in Lancaster, South Carolina on February 7, 2012. His killer was Derrick Lamont McIlwain, who confessed to the murder after witnesses stated they saw McIlwain and Clyburn arguing shortly before the shooting. On January 10, 2014, McIlwain pleaded guilty to voluntary manslaughter and was sentenced to 15 years in prison.
