= Lancaster County Jail (Lancaster, South Carolina) =

- U.S. National Register of Historic Places
- U.S. National Historic Landmark
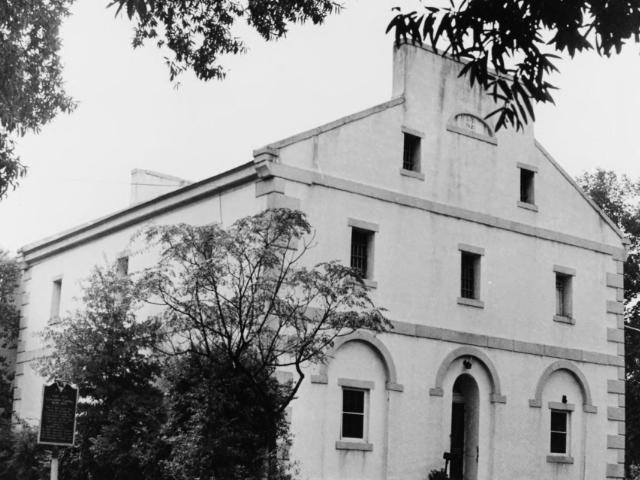
- Lancaster County Jail, 1971 HABS photo

- Location within South Carolina Location within the United States
- Location: 208 W. Gay St., Lancaster, South Carolina
- Coordinates: 34°43′9″N 80°46′19″W
- Built: 1823
- Architect: Robert Mills; W. W. Alsobrook
- NRHP reference No.: 71000789

Significant dates
- Added to NRHP: August 9, 1971
- Designated NHL: November 7, 1973

The Lancaster County Jail is a historic former jail building at 208 West Gay Street. Built in 1823, it is a virtually unaltered work of the noted early American architect Robert Mills, and reflects innovative changes in jail design promoted by him. It is individually listed on the National Register of Historic Places, and was declared a National Historic Landmark in 1973.

== Description and history ==
The old Lancaster County Jail is located in downtown Lancaster, on the north side of West Gay Street, between South French and South Catawba Streets. It is a three-story masonry structure, built out of brick covered with stucco, with stone trim elements and a gabled roof. Its main facade faces east, with the entrance and first-floor windows set in round-arched recesses. Stone string courses separate the floors, and stone quoining is found at the building corners. The sills and lintels of the windows are also of stone. The interior of the first floor has a barrel-vaulted brick ceiling, and has a hallway down the center, separating the jailer's living quarters on one side from debtor's cells on the other. The doors are made of heavy wooden planking with three-foot hinges. A stairway leads to the second floor, which has a series of barred cages at its center. The stairway is protected by heavy doors at the top and bottom.

The jail was built in 1823, and is almost certainly the work of Robert Mills, who was from 1820-30 a member of the state board of public works, and is generally credited with having designed virtually all of the state's public architecture built in that time. Mills was an advocate of reform in prison conditions, including the improvement of air circulation in the cell blocks, and the separation of criminals and debtors from each other. He also called for the jailer's quarters to be placed where the major features of the jail could be monitored; all of these features are found in the building, and the barrel-vaulted first-floor ceiling is also a Mills hallmark.

== See also ==
- List of National Historic Landmarks in South Carolina
- National Register of Historic Places listings in Lancaster County, South Carolina
