= Buford, South Carolina =

Buford
- Census-designated place
- Interactive map of Buford
- Coordinates: 34°45′20″N 80°37′23″W
- Country: United States
- State: South Carolina
- County: Lancaster

Area
  - Total: 2.28 sq mi (5.90 km^{2})
  - Land: 2.28 sq mi (5.90 km^{2})
  - Water: 0 sq mi (0.00 km^{2})
- Elevation: 659 ft (201 m)

Population (2020)
  - Total: 398
  - Density: 174.6/sq mi (67.41/km^{2})
- Time zone: UTC-5 (Eastern (EST))
  - Summer (DST): UTC-4 (EDT)
- ZIP code: 29720
- Area code: 803
- FIPS code: 45-10135
- GNIS feature ID: 2812971

Buford is an unincorporated community and census-designated place (CDP) in Lancaster County, South Carolina, United States. It was first listed as a CDP in the 2020 census with a population of 398. It lies at the intersection of South Carolina Highways 9 and 522.

== History ==
The community was named after Abraham Buford (1747–1833), commanding officer during the Waxhaw Massacre.

== Education ==
Public education in Buford is administered by Lancaster County School District. The district operates Buford Elementary School and Buford Middle School and Buford High School.

== Demographics ==
Historical population
Census	Pop.	Note	%±
2020	398		—
U.S. Decennial Census; 2020

Buford first appeared as a census designated place in the 2020 U.S. census.

=== 2020 census ===
Buford CDP, South Carolina – Demographic Profile (NH = Non-Hispanic)
Race / Ethnicity	Pop 2020	% 2020
White alone (NH)	356	89.45%
Black or African American alone (NH)	9	2.26%
Native American or Alaska Native alone (NH)	4	1.01%
Asian alone (NH)	6	1.51%
Pacific Islander alone (NH)	0	0.00%
Some Other Race alone (NH)	3	0.75%
Mixed Race/Multi-Racial (NH)	14	3.52%
Hispanic or Latino (any race)	6	1.51%
Total	398	100.00%

Note: the US Census treats Hispanic/Latino as an ethnic category. This table excludes Latinos from the racial categories and assigns them to a separate category. Hispanics/Latinos can be of any race.
