= Waxhaw Presbyterian Church Cemetery =

United States historic place in Lancaster County, South Carolina

- U.S. National Register of Historic Places
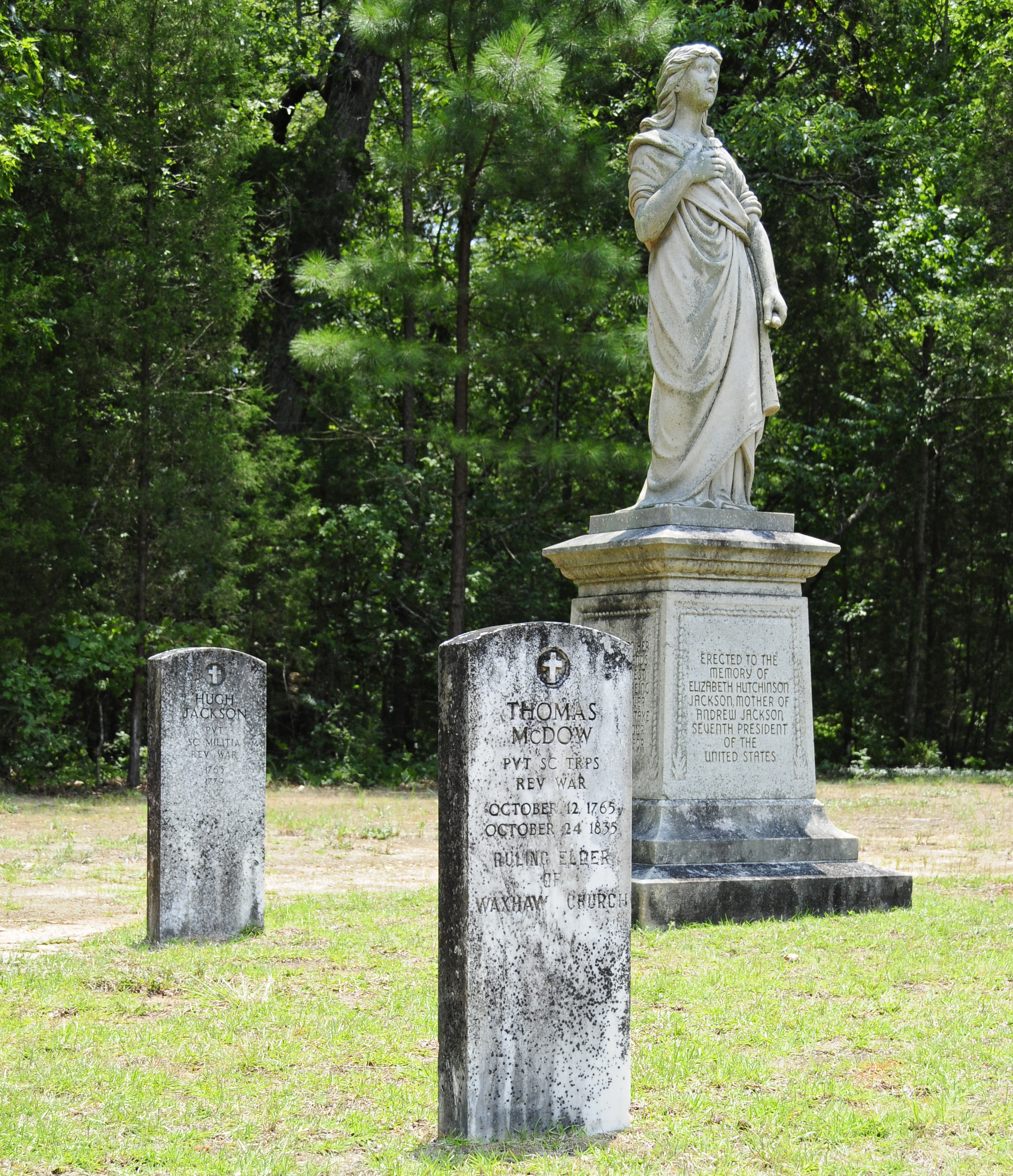
- Statue erected to the memory of Elisabeth Hutchinson Jackson, mother of Andrew Jackson, seventh president of the united States

- Location within South Carolina Location within the United States
- Location: 8 miles north of Lancaster off U.S. Route 521, near Lancaster, South Carolina
- Coordinates: 34°47′20″N 80°50′52″W
- Area: 5 acres (2.0 ha)
- Built: 1757
- Architect: Multiple
- NRHP reference No.: 75001701
- Added to NRHP: September 11, 1975

Waxhaw Presbyterian Church Cemetery, also known as Old Waxhaw Cemetery, is a historic Presbyterian church cemetery located near Lancaster, Lancaster County, South Carolina. It was founded in 1757 and is a visual reminder of the pioneer settlement of Waxhaw. It includes noteworthy examples of 18th and 19th century tombstones.

It was added to the National Register of Historic Places in 1975.

== Notable burials ==
- William Richardson Davie, Governor of North Carolina, 1798
- Andrew Jackson, Sr., father of Andrew Jackson
- Andrew Pickens, Sr. and Ann Pickens, parents of Andrew Pickens, U.S. Congressman
- James H. Witherspoon, Lt. Governor of South Carolina, 1826–1828
- Casualties of "Buford's Massacre", May 28, 1780
