= Craig House (Lancaster, South Carolina) =

Historic house in South Carolina, United States

- U.S. National Register of Historic Places
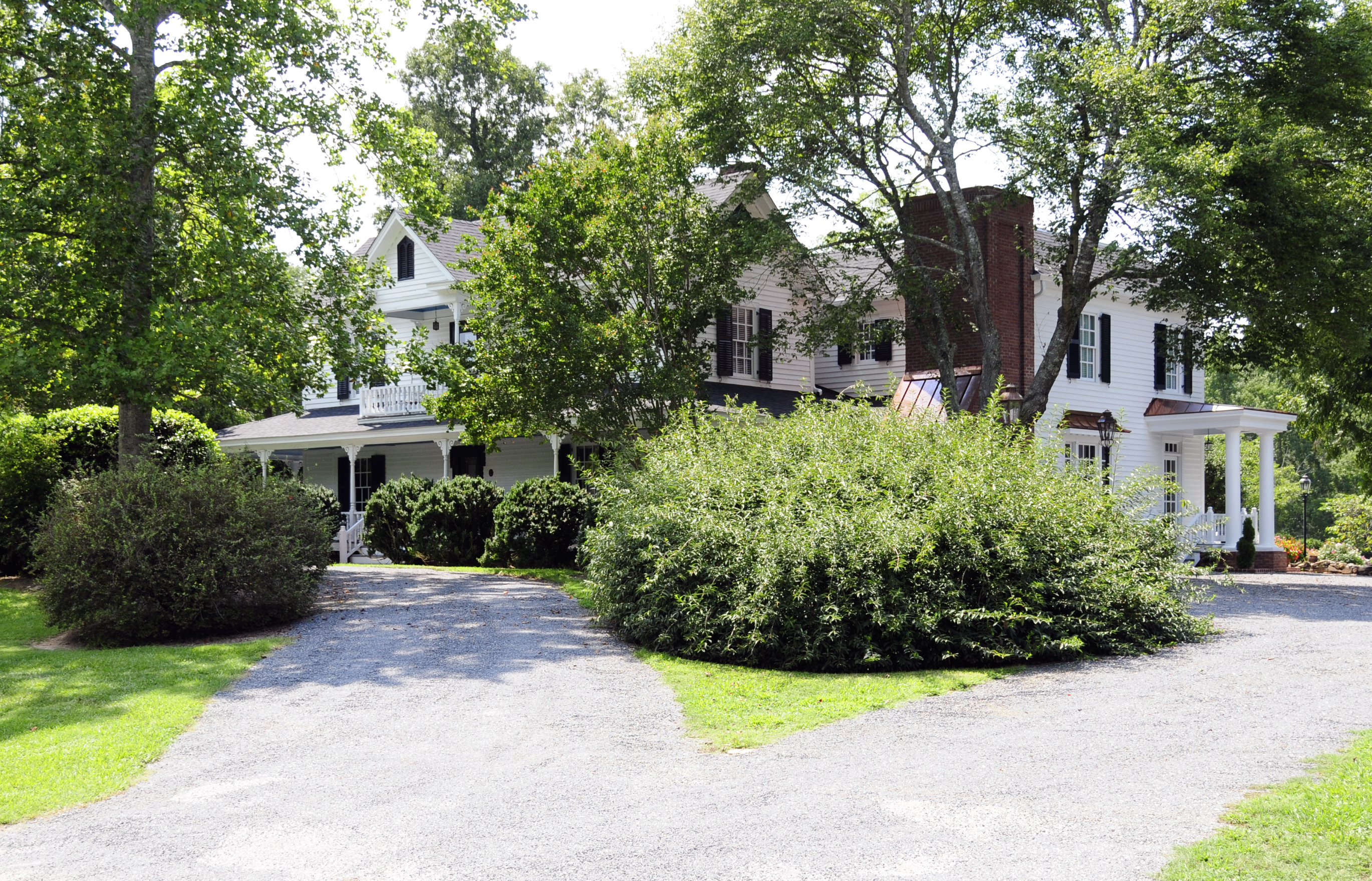

- Location within South Carolina Location within the United States
- Location: South Carolina Highway 185/Craig Dr., near Lancaster, South Carolina
- Coordinates: 34°45′28″N 80°46′1″W
- Built: c. 1860
- MPS: Lancaster County MPS
- NRHP reference No.: 90000093
- Added to NRHP: February 16, 1990

Craig House is a historic home located near Lancaster, Lancaster County, South Carolina. The House was originally owned by John Craig, Esquire, whose family originated in southwestern Scotland, immigrated to South Carolina from Northern Ireland in 1772. After receiving a land grant in Lancaster County from King George III, Craig bought additional land in the Waxhaws in 1773.

John Craig, Esquire and several of his sons fought in the Revolutionary War battles that occurred in the vicinity. The current Craig House dates from the early 1830s, and was originally a federal-style farmhouse. In 1901, it was significantly enlarged with a Victorian front addition by John Edgar and Amanda Drennan Craig, who were married in 1883 at Kilburnie, then the residence of the Drennans.

John E. Craig Jr. inherited Craig house after the death of both parents in 1989. His twin brother Bill Craig restored the house over a two-year period. in 2002 a wing was added in the back to accommodate the furnishings of the vacated Manhattan apartment. The old kitchen was removed in 2015 and replaced with a two-story addition and elevator.

The fields and woods surrounding historic Craig House are all part of pre-Civil War Craig Farm, which included more than a thousand acres of the area between Highways 200 and 521 from Montgomery Lane to several miles north of Cane Creek. Craig Farm today consists of close to 400 acres, owned by the five siblings of the current Craig generation and Johannes Tromp, and is operated as a cattle farm by Bill Craig, the twin brother of Kilburnie partner John Craig.

The House is a two-story, originally L-shaped, frame clapboard covered frame dwelling, with several rear additions. It features a porch and second story balcony.

It was added to the National Register of Historic Places in 1990.
