= Lancaster, South Carolina =

- City
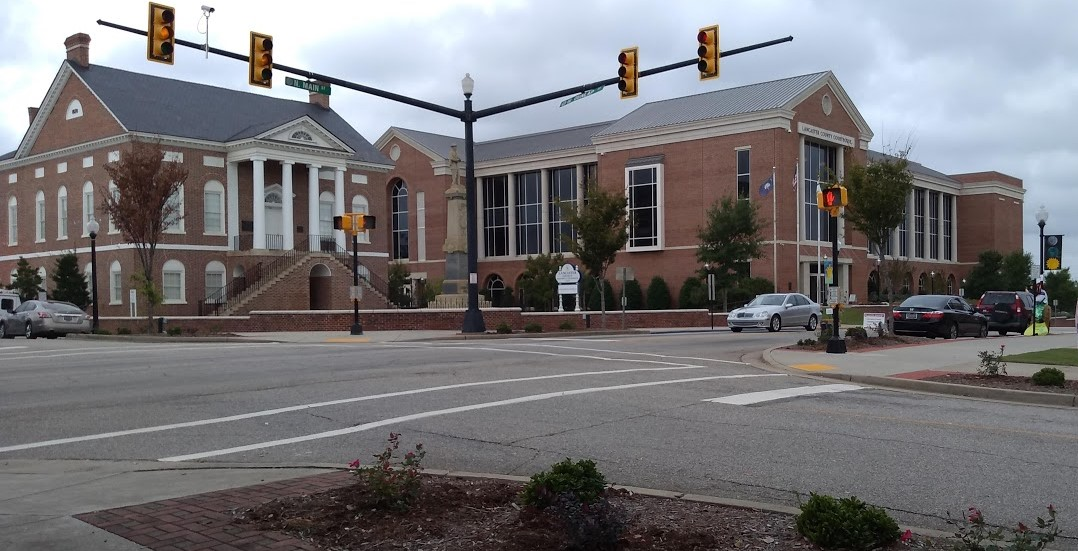
- Lancaster County Courthouse (left) at intersection of Main and Dunlap streets

- Seal
- Nickname: The Red Rose City
- Motto(s): "Forward Together, the Spirit of Lancaster"
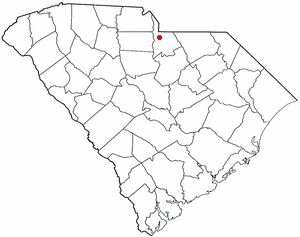
- Location of Lancaster, South Carolina
- Coordinates: 34°43′35″N 80°46′34″W
- Country: United States
- State: South Carolina
- County: Lancaster
- Incorporated: 1830

Area
  - City: 6.89 sq mi (17.85 km^{2})
  - Land: 6.81 sq mi (17.63 km^{2})
  - Water: 0.081 sq mi (0.21 km^{2})
- Elevation: 449 ft (137 m)

Population (2020)
  - City: 8,460
  - Density: 1,242.66/sq mi (479.79/km^{2})
  - Urban: 24,843
- Time zone: UTC-5 (Eastern (EST))
  - Summer (DST): UTC-4 (EDT)
- ZIP codes: 29720-29722
- Area codes: 803 and 839
- FIPS code: 45-39895
- GNIS feature ID: 2404881
- Website: www.lancastercitysc.com

Lancaster (/ˈleɪŋkəstər/) is a city in and the county seat of Lancaster County, South Carolina, United States, located in the Charlotte Metropolitan Area. As of the 2020 census, Lancaster had a population of 8,460. The city was named after the famous House of Lancaster.

== History ==
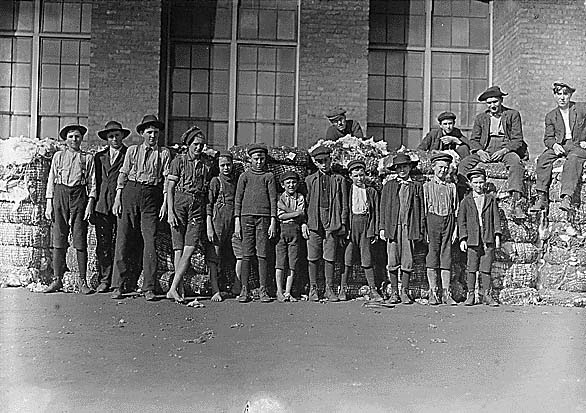
Group of boys working in Lancaster Cotton Mills. November 1908. Photographed by Lewis Hine.

The following are listed on the National Register of Historic Places:

- Robert Barnwell Allison House
- Craig House
- Cureton House
- Thomas Walker Huey House
- Lancaster Cotton Oil Company
- Lancaster County Courthouse
- Lancaster County Jail
- Lancaster Downtown Historic District
- Lancaster Presbyterian Church
- Mount Carmel A.M.E. Zion Campground
- North Carolina-South Carolina Cornerstone
- Perry-McIlwain-McDow House
- Leroy Springs House
- Wade-Beckham House
- Waxhaw Presbyterian Church Cemetery

== Geography ==
According to the United States Census Bureau, the city has a total area of 5.9 square miles (15 km^{2}), of which 5.8 square miles (15 km^{2}) is land and 0.1 square miles (0.26 km^{2}) (1.36%) is water.

== Demographics ==
Historical population
Census	Pop.	Note	%±
1850	376		—
1860	536		42.6%
1870	591		10.3%
1880	681		15.2%
1890	1,094		60.6%
1900	1,477		35.0%
1910	2,098		42.0%
1920	3,032		44.5%
1930	3,545		16.9%
1940	4,430		25.0%
1950	7,159		61.6%
1960	7,999		11.7%
1970	9,186		14.8%
1980	9,703		5.6%
1990	8,914		−8.1%
2000	8,177		−8.3%
2010	8,526		4.3%
2020	8,460		−0.8%
2025 (est.)	9,623	▲	13.7%
U.S. Decennial Census

=== Racial and ethnic composition ===
Lancaster city, South Carolina – Racial and ethnic composition Note: the US Census treats Hispanic/Latino as an ethnic category. This table excludes Latinos from the racial categories and assigns them to a separate category. Hispanics/Latinos may be of any race.
Race / Ethnicity (NH = Non-Hispanic)	Pop 2000	Pop 2010	Pop 2020	% 2000	% 2010	% 2020
White alone (NH)	3,822	3,515	3,280	46.74%	41.23%	38.77%
Black or African American alone (NH)	4,025	4,353	3,998	49.22%	51.06%	47.26%
Native American or Alaska Native alone (NH)	9	15	22	0.11%	0.18%	0.26%
Asian alone (NH)	68	79	87	0.83%	0.93%	1.03%
Native Hawaiian or Pacific Islander alone (NH)	2	0	0	0.02%	0.00%	0.00%
Other race alone (NH)	7	7	22	0.09%	0.08%	0.26%
Mixed race or Multiracial (NH)	60	69	295	0.73%	0.81%	3.49%
Hispanic or Latino (any race)	184	488	756	2.25%	5.72%	8.94%
Total	8,177	8,526	8,460	100.00%	100.00%	100.00%

=== 2020 census ===
As of the 2020 census, Lancaster had a population of 8,460, with 3,535 households and 2,064 families residing in the city.

The median age was 37.7 years. 26.5% of residents were under the age of 18 and 18.9% of residents were 65 years of age or older. For every 100 females there were 80.3 males, and for every 100 females age 18 and over there were 72.5 males age 18 and over.

Of those households, 32.9% had children under the age of 18 living in them. Of all households, 29.0% were married-couple households, 18.9% were households with a male householder and no spouse or partner present, and 46.5% were households with a female householder and no spouse or partner present. About 35.1% of all households were made up of individuals and 16.9% had someone living alone who was 65 years of age or older.

There were 3,897 housing units, of which 9.3% were vacant. The homeowner vacancy rate was 3.2% and the rental vacancy rate was 6.8%.

99.9% of residents lived in urban areas, while 0.1% lived in rural areas.

Racial composition as of the 2020 census
Race	Number	Percent
White	3,418	40.4%
Black or African American	4,018	47.5%
American Indian and Alaska Native	43	0.5%
Asian	88	1.0%
Native Hawaiian and Other Pacific Islander	0	0.0%
Some other race	356	4.2%
Two or more races	537	6.3%

=== 2010 census ===
As of the census of 2010, there were 10,160 people, 5,396 households, and 3,115 families residing in the city. The population density was 1,406.2 inhabitants per square mile (542.9/km^{2}). There were 3,778 housing units at an average density of 649.7 per square mile (250.9/km^{2}). The racial makeup of the city was 49.49% African American, 47.54% White, 0.12% Native American, 0.88% Asian, 0.04% Pacific Islander, 1.15% from other races, and 0.78% from two or more races. Hispanic or Latino of any race were 2.25% of the population.

There were 3,396 households, out of which 27.3% had children under the age of 18 living with them, 35.5% were married couples living together, 22.6% had a female householder with no husband present, and 37.7% were non-families. 33.1% of all households were made up of individuals, and 15.2% had someone living alone who was 65 years of age or older. The average household size was 2.37 and the average family size was 3.01.

In the city, the population was spread out, with 25.8% under the age of 18, 8.9% from 18 to 24, 26.8% from 25 to 44, 21.8% from 45 to 64, and 16.6% who were 65 years of age or older. The median age was 37 years. For every 100 females, there were 83.1 males. For every 100 females age 18 and over, there were 77.1 males.

The median income for a household in the city was $28,650, and the median income for a family was $33,380. Males had a median income of $27,090 versus $22,382 for females. The per capita income for the city was $16,828. About 18.0% of families and 23.0% of the population were below the poverty line, including 33.2% of those under age 18 and 17.8% of those age 65 or over.

== Education ==
Lancaster is home to the Lancaster County School District, SC which has around 11 elementary schools, 5 middle schools, and 4 high schools. In 2008 South Carolina Governor Mark Sanford named Andrew Jackson Middle School, located in nearby Kershaw, as the recipient of the state's Best Special Education School Award. The City is also home to the University of South Carolina at Lancaster, also known as USCL.

Public Schools Located in Lancaster:

- Lancaster High School
- Andrew Jackson High School
- Indian Land High School
- Andrew Jackson Middle School
- Indian Land Middle School
- A.R. Rucker Middle School
- Buford Elementary School

Indian Land Intermediate Indian Land Elementary

- Buford Middle School
- Buford High School
- Erwin Elementary School
- South Middle School
- North Elementary School
- McDonald Green Elementary School
- Brooklyn Springs Elementary School
- Clinton Elementary School
- Discovery Elementary School
- Southside Pre-School

Private Schools:

- Carolina Christian Academy
- Lancaster Christian Academy

Universities:

- USC Lancaster

Library:

- Lancaster has a public library which is the main building of the Lancaster County Library System. Additional branches are located in Indian Land and Kershaw.

== Media ==
- Lancaster is mentioned in the novelette, Facing Demons: An All Hallows' Eve Tale by Kevin Matthew Hayes.

== Notable people ==
- Tom Addison – former professional football player with the Boston Patriots, 1960-1968
- Francis Bell – member of the South Carolina Senate
- Cathy Smith Bowers – poet and professor; North Carolina Poet Laureate, 2010–2012
- Tom Caskey - human geneticist
- Danny Clyburn – baseball player
- Don Dixon – musician and producer
- Charles Duke – NASA astronaut who walked on the Moon during the Apollo 16 mission
- John P. Gaston – member of the South Carolina House of Representatives
- Mark Hammond - South Carolina Secretary of State
- Hattie N. Harrison – Maryland legislator and educator
- Jim Hodges – former governor of South Carolina
- Andrew Jackson – seventh president of the United States
- Nina Mae McKinney – one of the early African-American film stars in the United States
- Julie Roberts – country music singer
- Aaron Robinson – professional baseball player, primarily with the New York Yankees
- J. Marion Sims – controversial founder of gynecology
- Elliot White Springs – World War I flying ace
- Brandon Still - keyboardist for Blackberry Smoke (2009–present)
- Sindarius Thornwell – professional basketball player Los Angeles Clippers
- Maurice Williams – singer
