= Lancaster County, South Carolina =

County in South Carolina, United States

- County
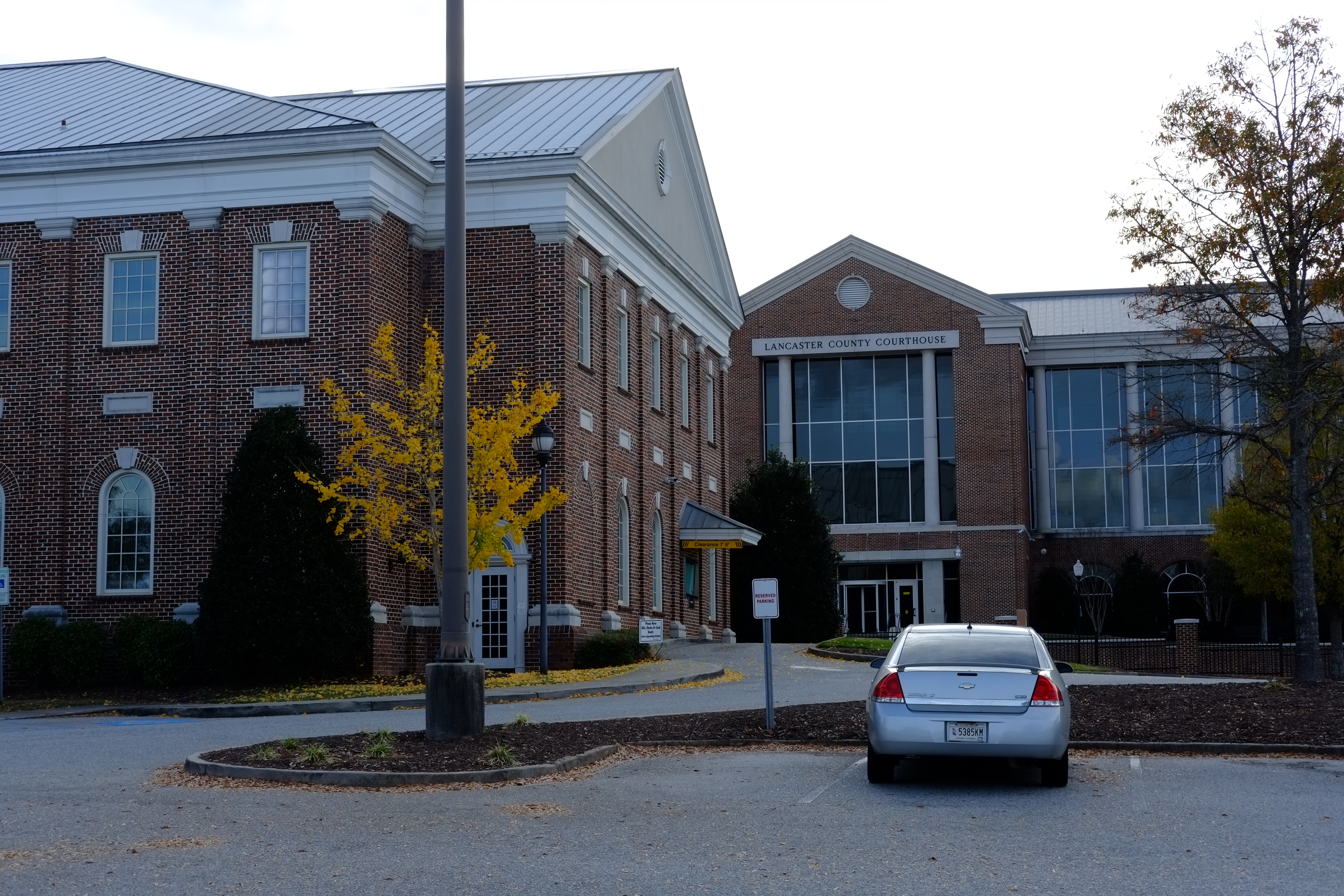
- Lancaster County Courthouse

- Seal Logo
- Motto(s): "Discover Lancaster County, South Carolina"
- Location within the U.S. state of South Carolina
- Interactive map of Lancaster County, South Carolina
- Coordinates: 34.69°N 80.70°W
- Country: United States
- State: South Carolina
- Founded: 1785
- Named for: House of Lancaster
- Seat: Lancaster
- Largest community: Indian Land

Area
  - Total: 555.05 sq mi (1,437.6 km^{2})
  - Land: 549.07 sq mi (1,422.1 km^{2})
  - Water: 5.98 sq mi (15.5 km^{2}) 1.08%

Population (2020)
  - Total: 96,016
  - Estimate (2025): 114,296 ▲
  - Density: 174.87/sq mi (67.518/km^{2})
- Time zone: UTC−5 (Eastern)
  - Summer (DST): UTC−4 (EDT)
- Congressional district: 5th
- Website: www.lancastercountysc.gov

Lancaster County /ˈlæŋkəstər/ is a county located in the U.S. state of South Carolina. As of the 2020 census, its population was 96,016, Its county seat is Lancaster, which has an urban population of 23,979. The county was created in 1785. Lancaster County is included in the Charlotte-Concord-Gastonia, NC-SC Metropolitan Statistical Area. It is located in the Piedmont region.

== History ==
The Catawba Indians occupied what became organized as Lancaster County as part of their historic tribal lands. The Siouan-speaking Catawba were once considered one of the most powerful Southeastern tribes. The Catawba and other Siouan peoples are believed to have emerged and coalesced as individual tribes in the Southeast. Primarily sedentary, cultivating their own crops, the Catawba were friendly toward the early European colonists.

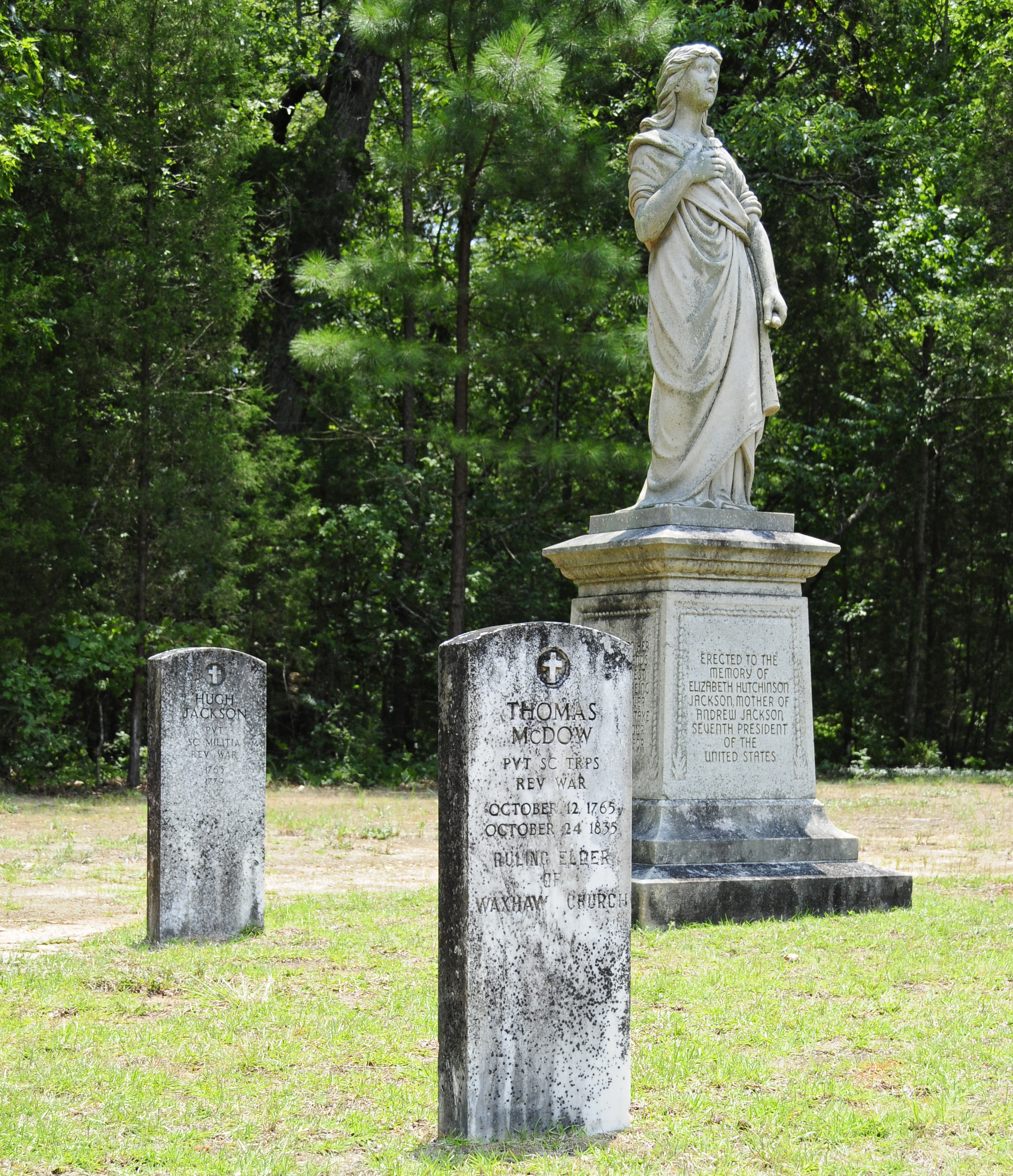
Waxhaw Presbyterian Church Cemetery

When the first Anglo-Europeans reached this area in the early 1750s, they settled between Rum Creek and Twelve Mile Creek. Waxhaw Creek within this area was named after the Waxhaw Indian tribe that was prominent in the region. The majority of the new settlers were Scots-Irish who had migrated from Pennsylvania, where they had landed in Philadelphia. Other Scots-Irish from the backcountry of North Carolina and Virginia joined them. The Scots-Irish settlers were exclusively Presbyterian. Over 9 out of 10 of them originated in County Antrim, Ireland in what has since become Northern Ireland. A significant minority of the population was German.

Many of the early settlers migrated to South Carolina from Lancaster, Lancashire in the northwest region of England. They had named their county for the House of Lancaster, which had opposed the House of York in the struggles of 1455–85, known as the War of the Roses. The House of Lancaster chose the red rose as their emblem while their neighbor, York County, boasts the white rose.

A second settlement was made in the lower part of the present Lancaster County on Hanging Rock Creek. The South Carolina colony first made a grant to settlers there in 1752; it included the overhanging mass of rock for which the creek was named. About the time the colony opened up this section, other settlers came in and settled along Lynches Creek, Little Lynches creek, Flat Creek, Beaver Creek, and lower Camp Creek. In coming to the Lancaster area, the first settlers followed old Indian paths. The increased traffic began to enlarge the paths and improve them as dirt roads. Several settlers from the regions of Norfolk, England, Suffolk, England and Essex, England arrived in what would later become Lancaster County in the late 1750s. These settlers were overwhelmingly Baptists, Methodists and Anglicans. After the American Revolution, those who were Anglican became members of the Episcopal Church.

The Rocky River Road was also based on an Indian path. During the American Revolutionary War, Colonel Abraham Buford and his forces fled from Tarleton along this road. He was overtaken a few miles south of the North Carolina state line, where the Patriot forces were defeated in the Battle of Waxhaws. Locals call it Buford's Massacre. Today, the Rocky River Road has been absorbed by part of South Carolina Highway 522, which was constructed following the old thoroughfare very closely.

== Geography ==
According to the U.S. Census Bureau, the county has a total area of 555.05 square miles (1,437.6 km^{2}), of which 549.07 square miles (1,422.1 km^{2}) is land and 5.98 square miles (15.5 km^{2}) (1.08%) is water. It is bounded on the west by the Catawba River and Sugar Creek and on the east by the Lynches River.

=== State and local protected areas/sites ===
- Forty Acre Rock Heritage Preserve/Wildlife Management Area
- Andrew Jackson State Park
- Buford Battleground
- Hanging Rock Battleground
- Historic Craig House
- Landsford Canal State Park

=== Major water bodies ===
- Catawba River
- Fishing Creek Lake
- Flat Rock Creek
- Gills Creek
- Lake Wateree
- Lynches River
- Sugar Creek

=== Adjacent counties ===
- Union County, North Carolina – northeast
- Chesterfield County – east
- Kershaw County – south
- Fairfield County – southwest
- York County – west
- Chester County – west
- Mecklenburg County, North Carolina – north

=== Major highways ===
- US 521
- US 521 Bus.
- US 601
- SC 5
- SC 9
- SC 9 Bus.
- SC 75
- SC 75 Truck
- SC 97
- SC 157
- SC 157 Truck
- SC 160
- SC 200
- SC 265
- SC 341
- SC 341 Truck
- SC 522
- SC 903
- SC 914

=== Major infrastructure ===
- Lancaster County Airport

== Demographics ==
Historical population
Census	Pop.	Note	%±
1790	6,302		—
1800	6,012		−4.6%
1810	6,318		5.1%
1820	8,716		38.0%
1830	10,361		18.9%
1840	9,907		−4.4%
1850	10,988		10.9%
1860	11,797		7.4%
1870	12,087		2.5%
1880	16,903		39.8%
1890	20,761		22.8%
1900	24,311		17.1%
1910	26,650		9.6%
1920	28,628		7.4%
1930	27,980		−2.3%
1940	33,542		19.9%
1950	37,071		10.5%
1960	39,352		6.2%
1970	43,328		10.1%
1980	53,361		23.2%
1990	54,516		2.2%
2000	61,351		12.5%
2010	76,652		24.9%
2020	96,016		25.3%
2025 (est.)	114,296	▲	19.0%
U.S. Decennial Census; 1790–1960 1900–1990; 1990–2000 2010–2020

=== Racial and ethnic composition ===
Lancaster County, South Carolina – Racial and ethnic composition Note: the US Census treats Hispanic/Latino as an ethnic category. This table excludes Latinos from the racial categories and assigns them to a separate category. Hispanics/Latinos may be of any race.
Race / Ethnicity (NH = Non-Hispanic)	Pop 1980	Pop 1990	Pop 2000	Pop 2010	Pop 2020	% 1980	% 1990	% 2000	% 2010	% 2020
White alone (NH)	40,095	40,394	43,245	53,490	64,927	75.14%	74.10%	70.49%	69.78%	67.62%
Black or African American alone (NH)	12,815	13,780	16,397	18,162	19,101	24.02%	25.28%	26.73%	23.69%	19.89%
Native American or Alaska Native alone (NH)	48	60	130	214	220	0.09%	0.11%	0.21%	0.28%	0.23%
Asian alone (NH)	41	58	156	492	1,765	0.08%	0.11%	0.25%	0.64%	1.84%
Native Hawaiian or Pacific Islander alone (NH)	x	x	7	15	14	x	x	0.01%	0.02%	0.01%
Other race alone (NH)	13	12	47	120	337	0.02%	0.02%	0.08%	0.16%	0.35%
Mixed race or Multiracial (NH)	x	x	391	775	3,358	x	x	0.64%	1.01%	3.50%
Hispanic or Latino (any race)	349	212	978	3,384	6,294	0.65%	0.39%	1.59%	4.41%	6.56%
Total	53,361	54,516	61,351	76,652	96,016	100.00%	100.00%	100.00%	100.00%	100.00%

=== 2020 census ===
As of the 2020 census, the county had a population of 96,016 and 24,327 families. The median age was 43.0 years, with 22.3% of residents under the age of 18 and 22.1% aged 65 years or older. For every 100 females there were 94.1 males, and for every 100 females age 18 and over there were 91.3 males age 18 and over.

The racial makeup of the county was 68.9% White, 20.1% Black or African American, 0.3% American Indian and Alaska Native, 1.9% Asian, 0.0% Native Hawaiian and Pacific Islander, 2.8% from some other race, and 6.0% from two or more races. Hispanic or Latino residents of any race comprised 6.6% of the population.

62.1% of residents lived in urban areas, while 37.9% lived in rural areas.

There were 37,903 households in the county, of which 30.9% had children under the age of 18 living with them and 27.8% had a female householder with no spouse or partner present. About 25.1% of all households were made up of individuals and 12.7% had someone living alone who was 65 years of age or older.

There were 41,030 housing units, of which 7.6% were vacant. Among occupied housing units, 78.7% were owner-occupied and 21.3% were renter-occupied. The homeowner vacancy rate was 1.5% and the rental vacancy rate was 9.7%.

=== 2010 census ===
At the 2010 census, there were 76,652 people, 29,697 households, and 21,122 families living in the county. The population density was 139.6 inhabitants per square mile (53.9/km^{2}). There were 32,687 housing units at an average density of 59.5 per square mile (23.0/km^{2}). The racial makeup of the county was 71.5% white, 23.8% black or African American, 0.6% Asian, 0.3% American Indian, 2.4% from other races, and 1.3% from two or more races. Those of Hispanic or Latino origin made up 4.4% of the population. In terms of ancestry, 23.9% were American, 8.0% were Irish, 7.6% were English, and 7.2% were German.

Of the 29,697 households, 33.2% had children under the age of 18 living with them, 51.0% were married couples living together, 15.4% had a female householder with no husband present, 28.9% were non-families, and 24.7% of all households were made up of individuals. The average household size was 2.51 and the average family size was 2.97. The median age was 39.7 years.

The median income for a household in the county was $38,959 and the median income for a family was $46,388. Males had a median income of $39,681 versus $28,985 for females. The per capita income for the county was $19,308. About 15.8% of families and 20.4% of the population were below the poverty line, including 30.2% of those under age 18 and 11.2% of those age 65 or over.

=== 2000 census ===
At the 2000 census, there were 61,351 people, 23,178 households, and 16,850 families living in the county. The population density was 112 inhabitants per square mile (43/km^{2}). There were 24,962 housing units at an average density of 46 per square mile (18/km^{2}). The racial makeup of the county was 71.03% White American, 26.86% African American, 0.22% Native American, 0.27% Asian American, 0.02% Pacific Islander, 0.89% from other races, and 0.71% from two or more races. 1.59% of the population were Hispanic or Latino of any race.

There were 23,178 households, out of which 33.40% had children under the age of 18 living with them, 52.60% were married couples living together, 15.50% had a female householder with no husband present, and 27.30% were non-families. 23.70% of all households were made up of individuals, and 9.40% had someone living alone who was 65 years of age or older. The average household size was 2.56 and the average family size was 3.01.

In the county, the population was spread out, with 25.40% under the age of 18, 8.60% from 18 to 24, 30.30% from 25 to 44, 23.60% from 45 to 64, and 12.10% who were 65 years of age or older. The median age was 36 years. For every 100 females there were 98.20 males. For every 100 females age 18 and over, there were 95.40 males.

The median income for a household in the county was $34,688, and the median income for a family was $40,955. Males had a median income of $30,176 versus $22,238 for females. The per capita income for the county was $16,276. About 9.70% of families and 12.80% of the population were below the poverty threshold, including 16.50% of those under age 18 and 15.80% of those age 65 or over.

== Government and politics ==
United States presidential election results for Lancaster County, South Carolina
Year	Republican		Democratic		Third party(ies)	
Year	No.	%	No.	%	No.	%
1900	70	5.11%	1,300	94.89%	0	0.00%
1904	69	4.39%	1,504	95.61%	0	0.00%
1912	6	0.52%	1,140	99.04%	5	0.43%
1916	1	0.07%	1,426	99.86%	1	0.07%
1920	10	0.61%	1,633	99.39%	0	0.00%
1924	8	0.59%	1,355	99.41%	0	0.00%
1928	8	0.55%	1,436	99.45%	0	0.00%
1932	5	0.16%	3,103	99.84%	0	0.00%
1936	0	0.00%	2,631	100.00%	0	0.00%
1940	14	0.43%	3,205	99.57%	0	0.00%
1944	13	0.51%	2,383	93.97%	140	5.52%
1948	30	1.18%	855	33.74%	1,649	65.07%
1952	3,080	38.17%	4,989	61.83%	0	0.00%
1956	1,610	24.26%	4,398	66.26%	629	9.48%
1960	2,909	34.34%	5,561	65.66%	0	0.00%
1964	4,742	48.83%	4,970	51.17%	0	0.00%
1968	4,874	37.75%	3,151	24.41%	4,886	37.84%
1972	9,016	77.86%	2,461	21.25%	103	0.89%
1976	4,997	37.33%	8,324	62.19%	64	0.48%
1980	6,410	42.25%	8,283	54.60%	477	3.14%
1984	10,383	63.92%	5,804	35.73%	57	0.35%
1988	9,152	59.46%	6,181	40.15%	60	0.39%
1992	7,757	41.58%	8,307	44.53%	2,591	13.89%
1996	7,544	42.01%	8,752	48.74%	1,661	9.25%
2000	11,676	56.39%	8,782	42.41%	247	1.19%
2004	12,916	62.05%	7,631	36.66%	267	1.28%
2008	16,441	56.85%	12,139	41.97%	341	1.18%
2012	19,333	58.33%	13,419	40.49%	392	1.18%
2016	23,719	60.91%	13,812	35.47%	1,407	3.61%
2020	30,312	60.78%	18,937	37.97%	619	1.24%
2024	33,623	61.78%	20,146	37.01%	658	1.21%

== Economy ==
In 2022, the GDP was $4.3 billion (about $39,708 per capita), and the real GDP was $3.8 billion (about $34,740 per capita) in chained 2017 dollars.

As of April 2024, some of the largest employers in the county include Food Lion and Walmart.

Employment and Wage Statistics by Industry in Lancaster County, South Carolina - Q3 2023
Industry	Employment Counts	Employment Percentage (%)	Average Annual Wage ($)
Accommodation and Food Services	2,208	9.0	20,644
Administrative and Support and Waste Management and Remediation Services	1,650	6.7	32,604
Agriculture, Forestry, Fishing and Hunting	81	0.3	38,896
Arts, Entertainment, and Recreation	162	0.7	19,084
Construction	873	3.6	64,220
Finance and Insurance	1,024	4.2	87,724
Health Care and Social Assistance	3,846	15.7	61,256
Information	488	2.0	98,696
Management of Companies and Enterprises	1,706	7.0	96,668
Manufacturing	2,796	11.4	60,320
Other Services (except Public Administration)	633	2.6	35,984
Professional, Scientific, and Technical Services	2,239	9.1	101,816
Public Administration	1,563	6.4	48,152
Real Estate and Rental and Leasing	306	1.3	62,192
Retail Trade	3,648	14.9	31,928
Transportation and Warehousing	331	1.4	57,252
Utilities	194	0.8	74,256
Wholesale Trade	731	3.0	91,000
Total	24,479	100.0%	58,427

== Media ==
Lancaster County is home to a free daily online and monthly print newspaper, the YoCoNews that covers all of York and Lancaster counties.

== Communities ==
=== City ===
- Lancaster (county seat and largest community)

=== Towns ===
- Heath Springs
- Kershaw
- Van Wyck

=== Census-designated places ===
- Buford
- Elgin
- Irwin
- Springdale
- Tradesville
- Unity

=== Other unincorporated communities ===
- Indian Land
- Taxahaw

=== Former community ===
- Lancaster Mill

== Notable people ==
- Bill Belk, professional football player (San Francisco 49ers)
- Sheldon Brown, professional football player
- Wayne A. Cauthen, first appointed African-American City Manager, Kansas City, MO
- Danny Clyburn, professional baseball player (Baltimore Orioles, Tampa Bay Devil Rays, Pittsburgh Pirates)
- Shawn Crawford, sprinter and Olympic gold medalist
- Don Dixon, record producer, songwriter, musician
- Charles Duke, astronaut and Moon walker during Apollo 16
- James "Butch" Duncan, Professional NFL Baltimore Colts player Super Bowl V
- Pep Harris, professional baseball player (Cleveland Indians, Anaheim Angels)
- Jim Hodges, former Governor of South Carolina
- Andrew Jackson, seventh President of the United States
- Nina Mae McKinney, actress and Broadway star
- Todd Ray, aka 'T-Ray', Grammy Award-winning record producer
- Julie Roberts, country music singer
- Aaron Robinson, Major League Baseball player (New York Yankees, Detroit Tigers, Chicago White Sox, Boston Red Sox)
- Darrell Shropshire, professional football player
- Nelson Sullivan, video artist and 1980s Club Kids personality.
- J. Marion Sims, surgeon known as the "Father of Modern Gynecology"
- The Zodiacs, led by Maurice Williams, R&B vocal group
- Jeff Twitty, professional baseball player (Kansas City Royals)
- Brian Williams, professional baseball player (Houston Astros, Detroit Tigers, Baltimore Orioles, Chicago Cubs, Boston Red Sox)

== See also ==
- Lancaster County School District
- List of counties in South Carolina
- National Register of Historic Places listings in Lancaster County, South Carolina
