= Jeff Walls =

American musician (1956–2019)

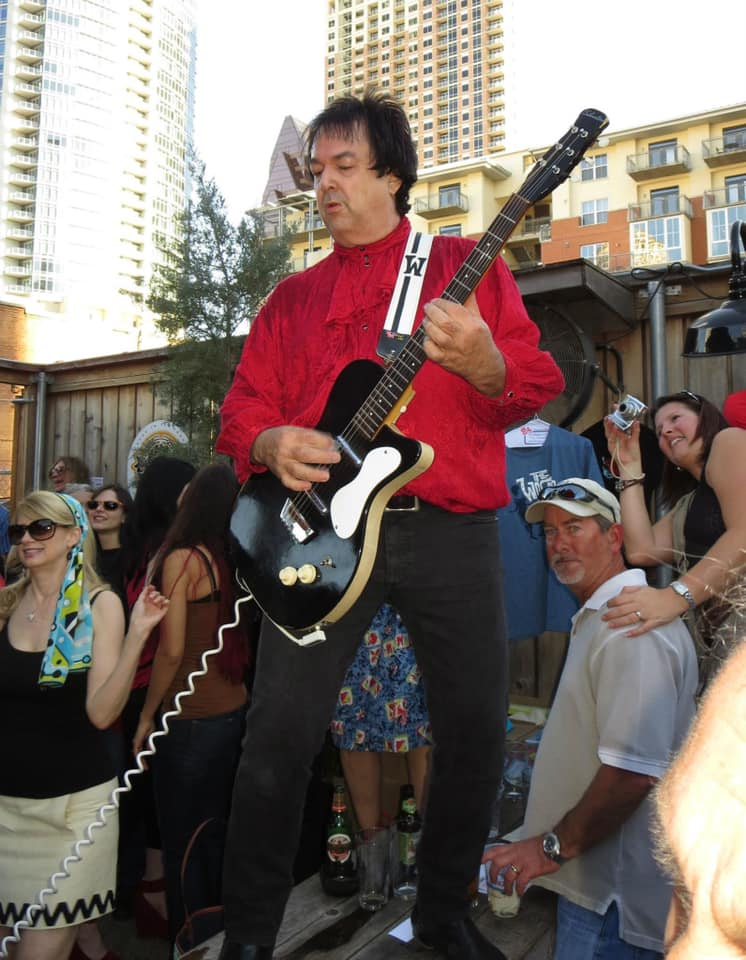
- Jeff Walls playing for The Woggles in 2016

Background information
- Also known as: Flesh Hammer
- Born: August 29, 1956; Marietta, Georgia, US
- Origin: Athens, Georgia, US
- Died: May 29, 2019 (aged 62) Durham, North Carolina, US
- Genres: Alternative rock; Jangle pop; Garage rock; Rock
- Formerly of: Guadalcanal Diary; Hillbilly Frankenstein; The Woggles; Bomber City
- Spouses: Rhett Crowe (m. 1988, divorced) Phyllis Bridges-Walls (m. 1997; died 2019)

Jeffrey Kermit Walls (August 29, 1956 – May 29, 2019) was an American musician, songwriter, and producer. He gained prominence as the lead guitarist of the 1980s alternative rock band Guadalcanal Diary, which originated from Marietta, Georgia.

== Early life ==
The son of an engineer, Jeff Walls was born in Marietta, Georgia. Walls went to Marietta High School with future Guadalcanal Diary members Rhett Crowe, Murray Attaway, and John Poe.

== Family ==
In 1988, Jeff Walls and Rhett Crowe, bassist for Guadalcanal Diary, married. Their daughter, Lillian, was born the following year. Their son, Carson, was born in 1990. Walls and Crowe later divorced. In 1997, Jeff married Hillbilly Frankenstein bassist Phyllis (Bridges) Walls and welcomed stepdaughter Maggie. Grandchildren include Kaitlyn (2003), Eva (2015) and Ezra (2020).

== Career ==
=== Guadalcanal Diary ===
Guadalcanal Diary, originating from Marietta, Georgia, was established after Walls and Murray Attaway transitioned away from their high school punk band, Strictly American. The band formed in 1981 and initially released an EP titled "Watusi Rodeo" along with the full-length LP "Walking in the Shadow of the Big Man" under DB Records. In 1985, they signed with Elektra Records, which reissued their debut LP and released three subsequent albums: "Jamboree" (1986), "2X4" (1987), and "Flip-Flop" (1989).

The band experienced several reunions in the late 1990s, one of which led to the self-released live album "At Your Birthday Party" in 1999, later reissued by Omnivore Recordings in 2018. Guadalcanal Diary briefly reunited again in 2011 to mark their 30th anniversary.

Songs from Guadalcanal Diary have been featured on the television show "Billions."

=== Hillbilly Frankenstein ===
Following Guadalcanal Diary’s breakup in 1989, Walls formed rockabilly/lounge band Hillbilly Frankenstein. Hillbilly Frankenstein was featured in the documentary Sleazefest: The Movie from No Place Like Home Productions. The documentary chronicled the 1994 two-day music festival in Chapel Hill, North Carolina that celebrated rockabilly and garage rock music. Hillbilly Frankenstein released one LP on Zontar Records, Hypnotica, and had begun recording new material before disbanding in 1995.

=== The Woggles ===
In 1990, Walls began a close association with '60s-influenced garage band The Woggles, producing and playing on a number of their recordings. The group maintained a heavy U.S and international touring schedule, and when guitarist George Holton died in 2003, Walls stepped in. once again assuming the tongue-in-cheek moniker ‘The Flesh Hammer’ from his theme song in Hillbilly Frankenstein. He soon became a full-time member of The Woggles, and continued to produce and play guitar with the group until his death.

=== Bomber City ===
In addition to his ongoing work as guitarist for The Woggles, Walls formed the group Bomber City with his wife, bassist Phyllis Walls, and former Guadalcanal Diary member Murray Attaway.

Bomber City's music included many collaborative songs written by Attaway and Walls, music from Attaway's solo album In Thrall, and some Guadalcanal Diary songs. Joining Attaway, Jeff, and Phyllis in Bomber City was Pat Patterson on drums, vocalist/percussionist Diana Crowe and Doug Stanley on keyboards and guitar .

=== Other Musical Endeavors ===
Walls’ other musical endeavors included the bands Blasting Cap and the Nairobi Trio.

Jeff collaborated with several other notable performers, including English singer-songwriter Holly Golightly, Hilton Valentine, and a re-formed version of The Plimsouls as a bassist.

== Death and legacy ==
On April 12, 2019, Jeff Walls received a diagnosis of pulmonary veno-occlusive disease (PVOD), a rare and progressive condition that restricts blood flow from the lungs to the heart. Walls was subsequently transferred to Duke University Hospital while awaiting a double lung transplant as treatment for the disease. Walls died on May 29, 2019 due to complications arising from pancreatic cancer.

Following Walls’ death, numerous fund-raising concerts were announced in Athens and Atlanta, Georgia to help raise money for Walls’ surviving family.

== Discography ==
=== Guadalcanal Diary albums ===
Year	Album	Label
1983	Watusi Rodeo EP	DB Records
1985	Walking in the Shadow of the Big Man	Elektra
1986	Jamboree	Elektra
1987	2X4	Elektra
1989	Flip-flop	Elektra
1999	At Your Birthday Party (live)	self-released

=== Woggles albums ===
Year	Album	Label
2007	Rock and Roll Backlash	Wicked Cool
2008	Tempo Tantrum	Wicked Cool
2013	The Big Beat	Wicked Cool
2014	Souled Out	Wicked Cool
2017	Tally Ho!	Wicked Cool
