= Murray Attaway =

American musician (born 1957)

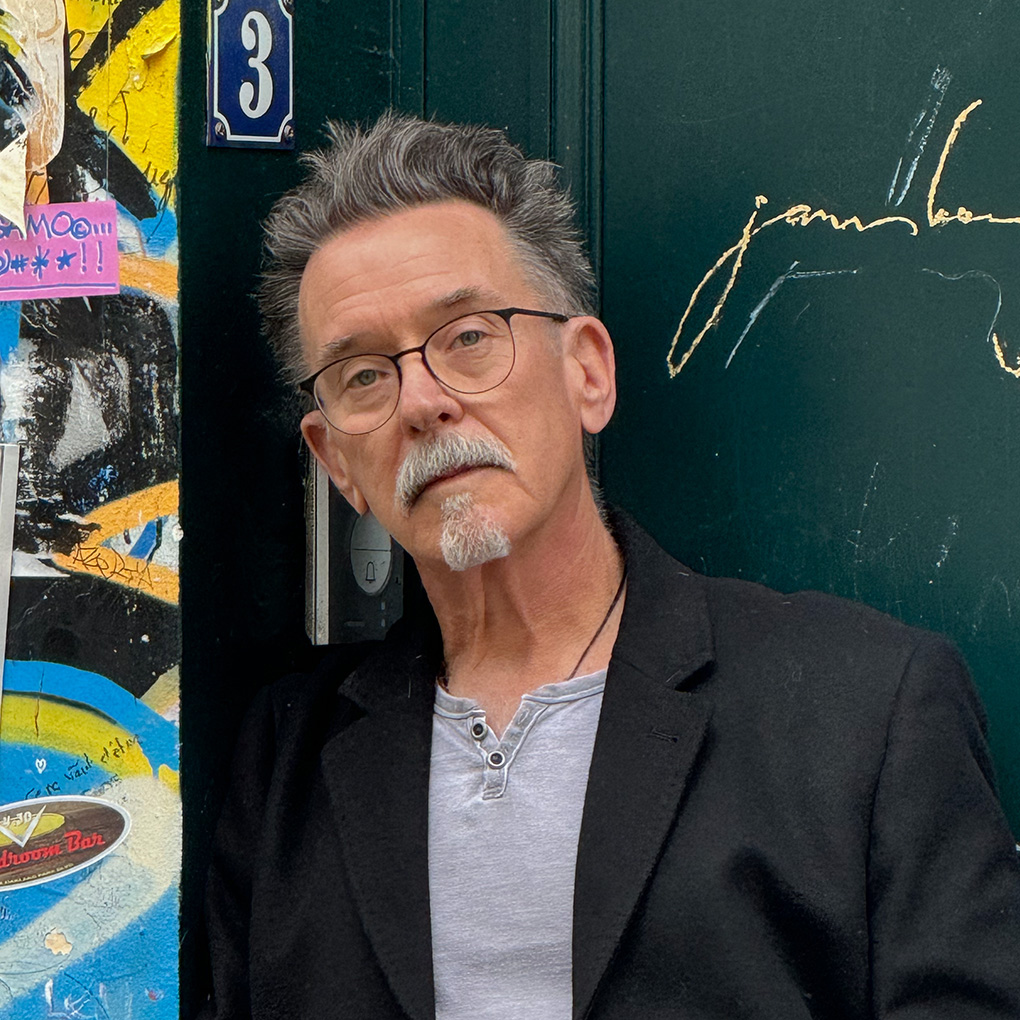
- Attaway in 2025

Background information
- Born: Murray Thomas Attaway; 30 November 1957 (age 68); Atlanta, Georgia, US
- Genres: Alternative rock; rock; Americana
- Occupations: Singer; songwriter; musician
- Instruments: Vocals; guitar
- Years active: 1981–present
- Labels: EOD; DB Records; Elektra; Geffen Records; Rhino Handmade; Omnivore; Moon Ray Sound
- Formerly of: Guadalcanal Diary
- Website: murrayattaway.com
- Family: Esra Holloway-Attaway (child)

Murray Thomas Attaway (born November 30, 1957) is an American musician, best known as the lead singer and rhythm guitarist for the Marietta, Georgia alternative jangle pop rock band Guadalcanal Diary. After the band's breakup, Attaway recorded one solo album, titled In Thrall, which was released by DGC Records in 1993, produced by Tony Berg. An alternate version of the track "Allegory" from In Thrall was included on DGC Rarities, Vol. 1. In 2025, after a thirty year hiatus, Attaway released his second album [Tense Music Plays...].

As a film composer, Attaway has written music for a number of independent films as well as having songs placed in numerous films and television shows.

Attaway was born in Atlanta, Georgia and attended Marietta High School.

In 2019, Attaway created the satirical "Dazzle Dudes" podcast which tells the story of a fictional group of inept young males who attempt to start a glam rock band in central Georgia in the 1970s. The show is written, performed and produced by Attaway.

In 2025, Attaway completed his first new album in over thirty years, [Tense Music Plays...]. All songs were performed by Attaway, with guest appearances by drummer and bassist Robert Schmid (The Swimming Pool Q's) and violinist Ana Balka. The album was recorded by Attaway, mixed by Mark Williams, mastered by Dave Harris and was released in May 2025.

== Discography ==
=== with Guadalcanal Diary ===
Year	Album	Label
1983	Watusi Rodeo EP	EOD
1984	Walking in the Shadow of the Big Man	Elektra
1986	Jamboree	Elektra
1987	2X4	Elektra
1989	Flip-Flop	Elektra
1999	At Your Birthday Party (live)	Guadco | Omnivore Records

=== Solo ===
1993	In Thrall	DGC Records
1995 (unreleased)	Delirium	DGC Records
2025	[Tense Music Plays...]	Moon Ray Sound

== Scores ==
Title	Year	Director	Notes
Midnight Edition	1993	Howard Libov	Film
Little Man	1999	Howard Libov	Short Film
Favorite Son	2008	Howard Libov	Film
