= Samuel J. Welsch =

American politician

Member of the Georgia House of Representatives from the . district
- In office 1934–1938

Member of the Georgia Senate from the 39th district
- In office 1938–1942

Mayor of Marietta, Georgia
- In office 1948–1955
- Preceded by: L. M. Blair
- Succeeded by: C. W. Bramlett

Mayor of Marietta, Georgia
- In office 1960–1963
- Preceded by: C. W. Bramlett

Personal details
- Born: Samuel Jefferson Welsch; September 15, 1902
- Died: September 21, 1990 (aged 88)

Samuel Jefferson Welsch (September 15, 1902 – September 21, 1990) is a former politician from Georgia. Welsch was a former member of the Georgia House of Representatives from 1934 to 1938 and a member of Georgia State Senate. Welsch was also a three term mayor of the city of Marietta, Georgia from 1948 to 1955 and from 1960 to 1963.

== Early career ==
Welsch graduated from Mercer University, where he was a member of Sigma Pi fraternity, in 1926. After graduation he taught at Marietta High School until 1931. While teaching, he worked on his law degree from the Atlanta Law School. After law school he opened a law firm with N.A. Morris who was a former speaker of the Georgia House of Representatives.

== State government ==
Welsch was elected to the Georgia House of Representatives in 1934, and re-elected in 1936. In 1938 he was elected to the Georgia State Senate representing the 39th District.

== Mayor ==
Welsch was elected mayor of Marietta, Georgia in 1948 and re-elected in 1952, serving until 1955. He was elected to a third term as mayor from 1960 to 1963. During his first term, in 1954, he served as president of the Georgia Municipal Association. During his third term as mayor, there was an explosion at Atherton’s Drug store that killed seven people and injured twenty-three on Halloween night in 1963. He was also taken to court during his third term where it was alleged that he was being paid more than what was allowed by the city charter. This was caused because he was providing services that should usually have been taken care of by a city manager.

== After public life ==
After leaving public office Welsch continued working with his law firm until retiring in 1975.

He died on September 21, 1990.

The Marietta City Hall Council Chambers are named for him.
