= Traye Simmons =

American football player (born 1987)

No. 37
- Position: Cornerback

Personal information
- Born: January 18, 1987 (age 39); Tallahassee, Florida, U.S.
- Listed height: 5 ft 9 in (1.75 m)
- Listed weight: 180 lb (82 kg)

Career information
- High school: Marietta (GA)
- College: Minnesota
- NFL draft: 2010: undrafted

Career history
- San Diego Chargers (2010–2011)*
- * Offseason or practice squad member only
- Stats at Pro Football Reference

Traye Simmons (born January 18, 1987) is an American former professional football cornerback. He attended Minnesota, as a member of the 2010 graduating class. Shortly after the draft ended, Simmons joined the San Diego Chargers as an undrafted free agent.

== Early life ==
Simmons was born in Tallahassee, Florida then later moved to Marietta, Georgia early in his childhood. He was introduced to athletics early in his life involving himself in football, track, basketball & baseball.

Simmons prepped at Marietta High School. In Simmons junior campaign, he recorded 38 tackles and a school record nine interceptions as a junior earning him first-team all-Cobb County and honorable mention all-state honors. He helped lead the Blue Devils to an 11–1 record and a Region 5-A championship as a senior. Recording five interceptions on the season while being named first-team all-Cobb County by the Marietta Daily Journal. Simmons also was an honorable mention Class 5-A all-state selection by the Georgia Sports Writers Association and was named the Cobb County Touchdown Club Defensive Back of the Year. Simmons was also a decorated track and field star earning letters in track from a freshman to senior years. During the 2004 Georgia state track meet, Simmons finished 4th in the 400m dash finals.

== Junior college career ==
Simmons played two seasons at College of the Sequoias. His freshman year, Simmons appeared in eight games as a freshman, recording 23 tackles, including two behind the line of scrimmage, and three pass break-ups. His sophomore season he totaled 29 tackles, including four for losses, in nine games as a sophomore in 2007. He also was credited with six pass break-ups and had six punt returns for 96 yards (16.0 average) on special teams. Simmons earned first team All-Valley Conference and JUCO all-American honors as a defensive back.

== College career ==
Simmons was a star at the University of Minnesota in the two years he was there. The talented transfer jumped right into the Gophers’ starting lineup and helped to solidify the secondary in the first year. He emerged as one of the Big Ten's top cornerbacks, earning second team all-conference honors from both the league's coaches and media behind 2009 first round Big Ten corners Malcolm Jenkins and Vontae Davis. Simmons was fifth in the Big Ten with four interceptions, returning one for a touchdown and added 14 pass breakups to lead the conference in passes defended and rank fifth nationally with 18. His senior year Simmons had 33 tackles, 2 interceptions, 8 pass breakups and a returned a blocked field goal for a touchdown. Simmons earned honorable mention all-conference for his senior campaign.
