= Luke Thomas (journalist) =

American sports journalist

- Born: August 5, 1979 (age 47); Republic of India
- Occupations: Journalist for CBS Sports & Showtime
- Years active: 2006–present
- Children: 1

Luke Thomas (born August 5, 1979) is an American combat sport analyst. As of October 2020, he works for CBS Sports. Between 2007 and 2019, Thomas worked as an MMA journalist and radio host.

== Early life ==
Thomas was born in 1979 in the Republic of India to an American foreign service officer father and a Syrian-Armenian mother who lived in Lebanon. Thomas mostly grew up in Washington, D.C., but lived in Marietta, Georgia for two years, graduating from Marietta High School. He graduated from The College of William & Mary. Between 1998 and 2005 he served in Battery H of the 3rd Battalion 14th Marines in Richmond, Virginia, reaching the rank of sergeant. While in college, he started training in Judo, and while serving in the military he participated in the Marine Corps Martial Arts Program.

== Career ==
Thomas has been dedicatedly following mixed martial arts since 2004. Between February 2006 and May 2007 (inactive between July 2006 and March 2007), Thomas founded and wrote commentary on his MMA dedicated blog Mad-Squabbles.com, with his online identity known as Mad Squabbles. In March 2007, the MMA website Fightopinion.com began promoting his articles. Fightlinker.com described the blog as "probably the best blog i've [sic] seen pop up in the past six months. Definitely worth bookmarking and visiting every day." From April 2007, MMA website UFCmania.com (acquired by SB Nation in 2009 as MMAmania.com) selected Mad Squabbles as one of its MMA beat reporters for its official MMA fighter ranking poll.

Between 2008 and late 2010, Thomas was color commentating live broadcast fight cards for the regional MMA promotion Ultimate Warrior Challenge. Between 2008 and 2012, he was host to sports talk radio show MMA Nation on WJFK-FM (CBS Radio's 106.7 The Fan). From 2012 to August 2020, he was the host of The Luke Thomas Show on Sirius XM radio (Rush, channel 93).

Between 2007 and 2011, contrary to a common misconception, Thomas was not the founder or co-founder of SB Nation's first MMA sports blog Bloody Elbow (launched February 15, 2007). Founder Nate Wilcox (Kid Nate) recruited Thomas to help run it on May 21, 2007. Thomas eventually became editor-in-chief of BloodyElbow.com. It was reviewed as one of the best MMA news & media blogs online. Currently, it is the 5th most popular MMA media & news website worldwide according to Alexa Internet.

From 2011 to 2019, Thomas was an MMA senior editor at SB Nation and senior editor at MMAFighting.com (acquired by SB Nation November 2011 from AOL); a 2 million unique users per month website in 2011, and currently the #3 most popular MMA media & news website worldwide according to Alexa Internet. Thomas was most notable on MMAFighting.com as a charter and regular panelist on The MMA Beat web series moderated by MMA journalist Ariel Helwani, and for his weekly webcast Promotional Malpractice and podcast Monday Morning Analyst.

In late 2019, Thomas was hired by ViacomCBS, initially working for Showtime and later for CBS Sports. Since then, he has co-hosted a MMA/Boxing podcast called Morning Kombat with Luke Thomas and Brian Campbell. Morning Kombat also does post-fight reaction and analysis for PPVs and major events. Morning Kombat won Best MMA Programming 2021 at the World MMA Awards.

=== Professional views ===
Thomas stated he likes MMA fighting because "Struggle and fear tackled by athleticism, technical know-how and innate desires for self-preservation brings out a side in humanity that exists only in the deepest recesses of our being. MMA fighting has no peer when it comes to the demands the sport places on its participants both physically and psychologically. And I love watching that dynamic in action"". But he hates everything else about the MMA world. He thinks many of the individuals in the industry are "utterly detestable". He suspects that "the majority of conversations [he has] with members of the fight community are either extended lies or at least contain a lie". Therefore, he tries to keep his direct contact with MMA promotions to a minimum.

He dislikes professional wrestling because he feels "it sucks" and he doesn't like fiction. He is very irritated by MMA journalists or analysts who are "gigantic fat slobs". According to Thomas "One need not train five days a week to be a competent analyst of MMA, but experiencing the rigors of physical punishment certainly informs your judgment."

Thomas, and other MMA journalists and fans, have criticized the UFC for putting on too many shows and thus diluting the quality of their product. On March 7, 2014; while watching Bellator 111 fight event which he reviewed on Mmafighting.com earlier that day, Thomas tweeted "Dear ALL MMA Promoters: More MMA is not better. No one cares anymore. Better MMA is better. Please fix your product. Thanks in advance.". UFC president Dana White responded with the tweet "Dear whoever the hell u are. Nobody gives a shit what u think 02 is sold out and fans r pumped for 2 nite. Ur opinion=WGAF" (White was referring to March 8, UFC Fight Night 37 in London). When another Twitter member confronted White, tweeting " if nobody gives a shit what [Thomas] thinks, then why is he on @ufc countdown shows?" White responded with the tweet "I already said wont make that mistake again". UFC Countdown shows are "UFC's documentary series profiling the fighters appearing in upcoming Ultimate Fighting Championship events" also featuring prominent MMA media members point of view.

== Personal life ==
In January 2014, following the reported suicide of MMA female fighter Cat Zingano's husband, Thomas shared that his mother took her own life in 2003 when he was 23. Thomas described his loss "a pain that is torturous and inextinguishable".

Thomas's wife is Colombian-born and was raised in Bogotá. They have one daughter together.

== Honors ==
Thomas was a 2014 Journalist of the Year World MMA Awards nominee.
