= Jaylen Hill =

American football player (born 1994)

No. 43
- Position: Cornerback

Personal information
- Born: May 26, 1994 (age 32); Atlanta, Georgia, U.S.
- Listed height: 5 ft 10 in (1.78 m)
- Listed weight: 178 lb (81 kg)

Career information
- High school: Marietta (GA)
- College: Jacksonville State (2012–2016)
- NFL draft: 2017: undrafted

Career history
- Baltimore Ravens (2017–2018)
- Stats at Pro Football Reference

Jaylen Jerrod Hill (born May 26, 1994) is an American former professional football player who was a cornerback in the National Football League (NFL). He played college football for the Jacksonville State Gamecocks.

== Professional career ==
Hill signed with the Baltimore Ravens as an undrafted free agent on May 16, 2017. He made the Ravens' final roster as an undrafted rookie, playing in six games primarily on special teams. He tore his ACL and MCL in Week 16 and was placed on injured reserve on December 26, 2017.

On August 31, 2018, Hill was placed on the physically unable to perform list to start the season while recovering from knee surgery.

On March 19, 2019, Hill was released by the Ravens.
