= Marietta Square =

Coordinates: 33°57′09″N 84°33′00″W

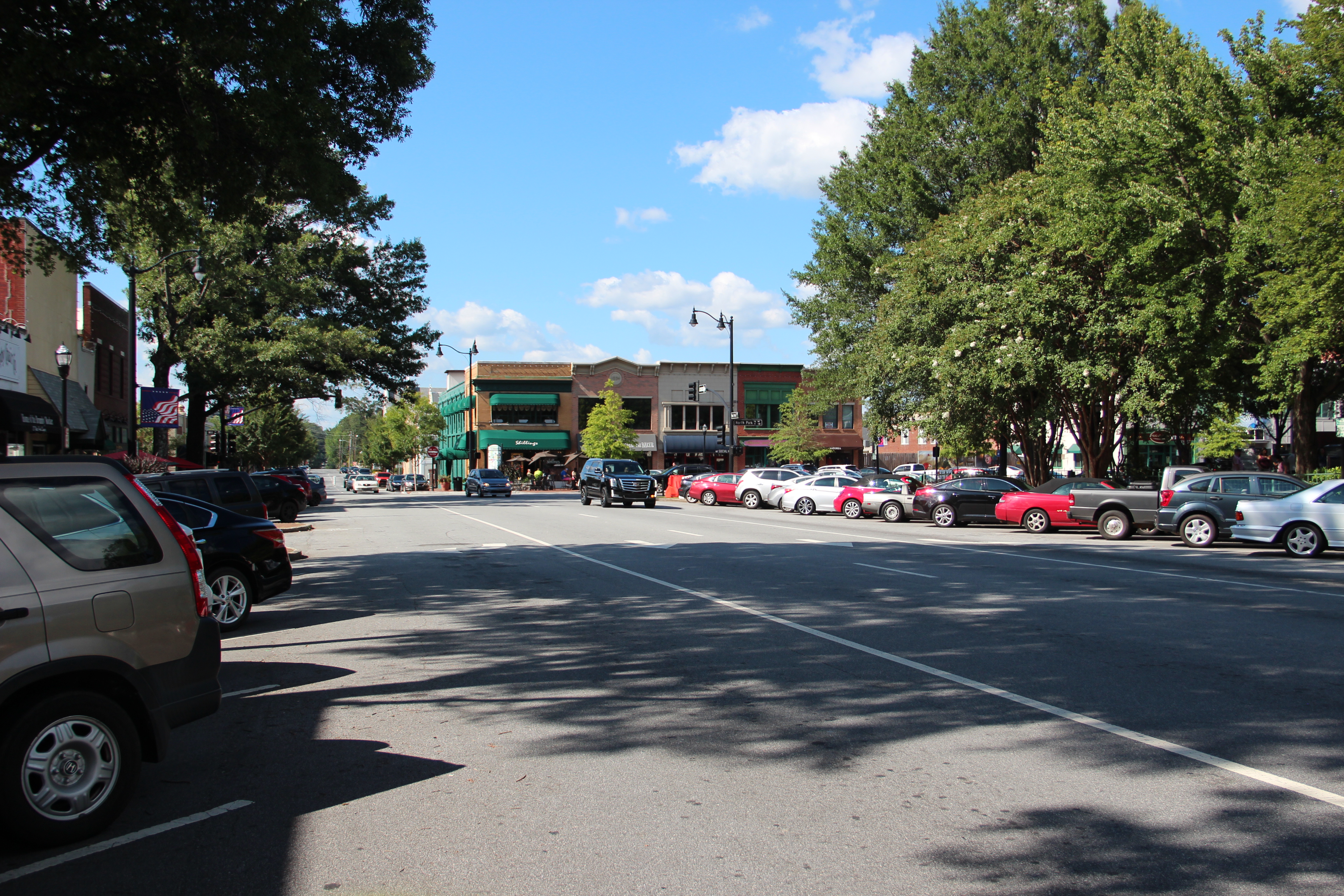
Marietta Square in 2017

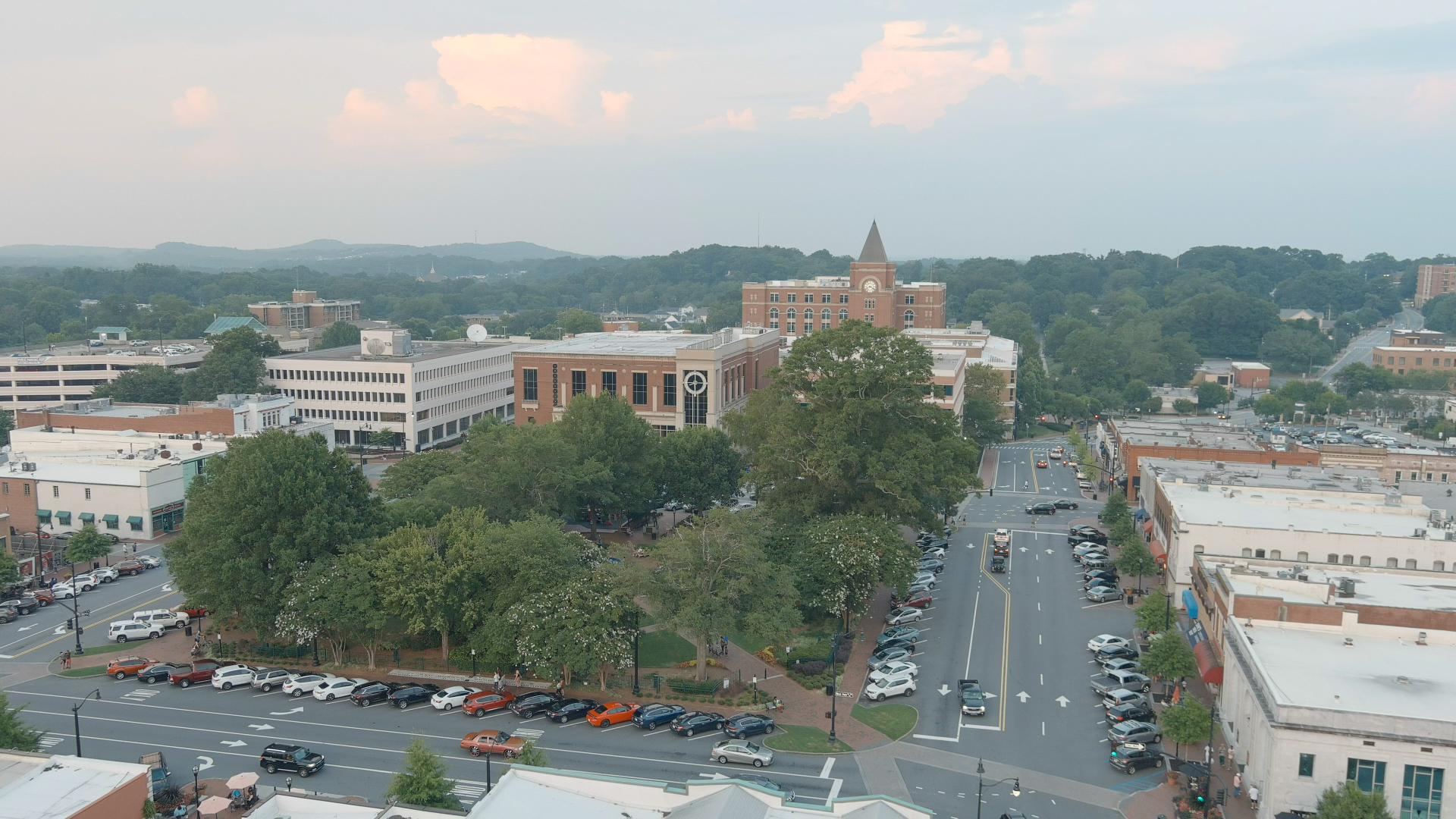
Marietta Georgia 2021

Marietta Square, with Glover Park at the center of the square, is a traditional city center in Marietta, Georgia, United States.

== History ==
When the Cobb County courthouse burned in 1848, Mayor John Glover donated the land at the center of Marietta Square to the city on the condition that it would stay a park or return to its heirs. Since then, the new courthouse has moved to its existing location, across the street from the southeast corner of the park. During the Civil War, the park was used as a training ground for the militia. On the north end of the park, a well provided water to parched men and women with a trough for horses. In the early 1900s the Atlanta trolley system was extended to Marietta and the trolley would turn around by circling the park. There was a maintenance shed across the street from the northeast corner.

== Photos ==
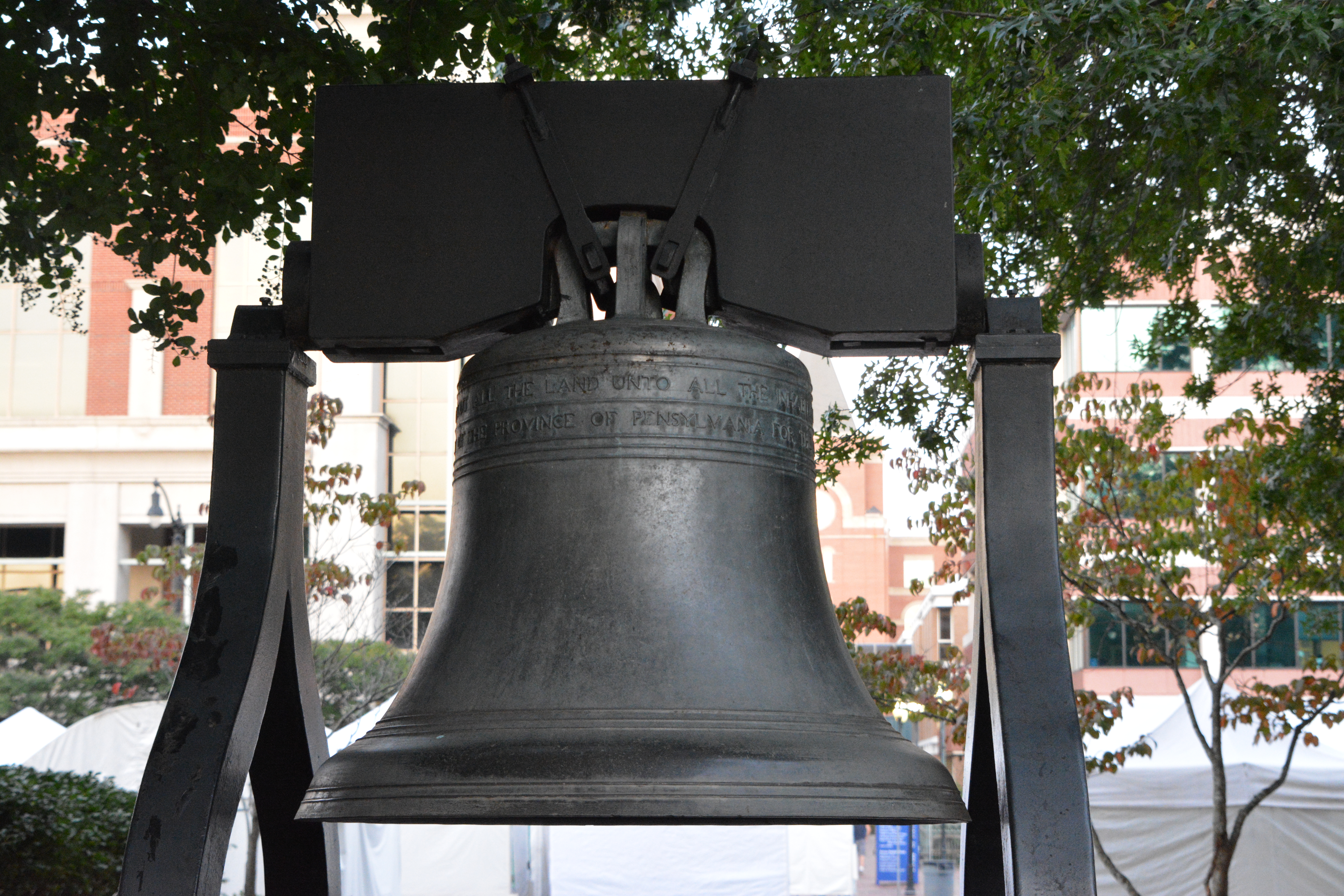
Replica of Liberty Bell

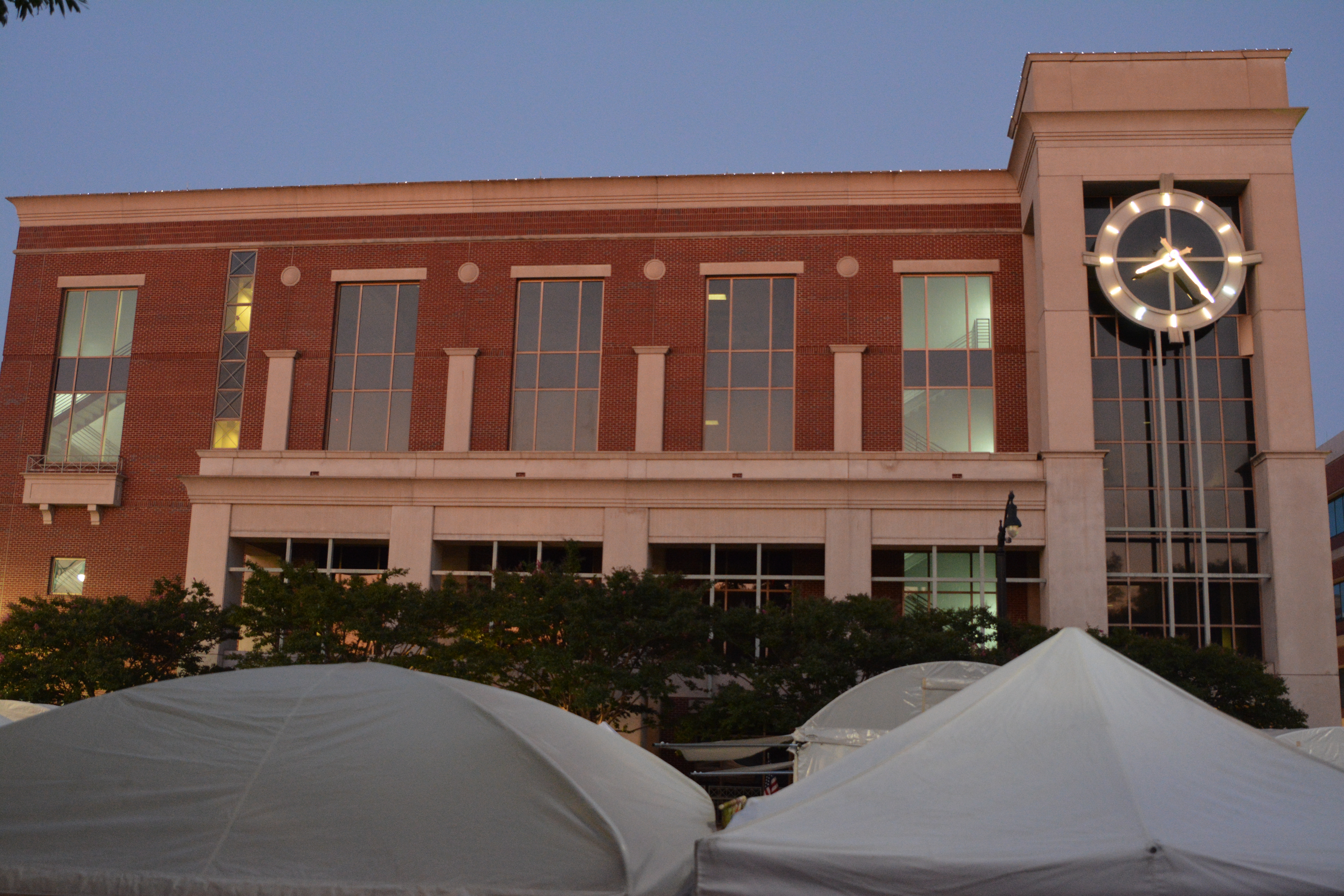
Marietta City Hall

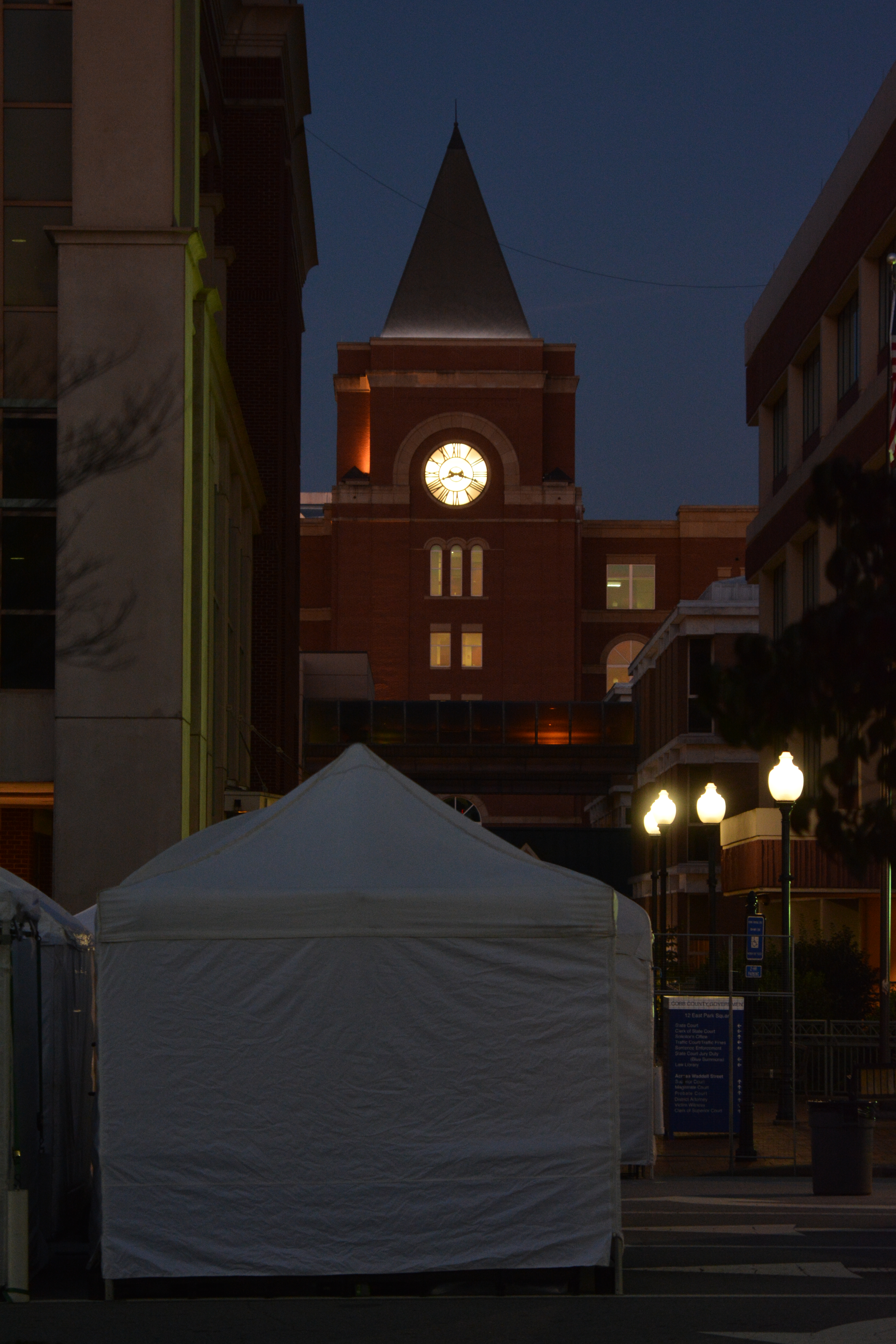
Courthouse

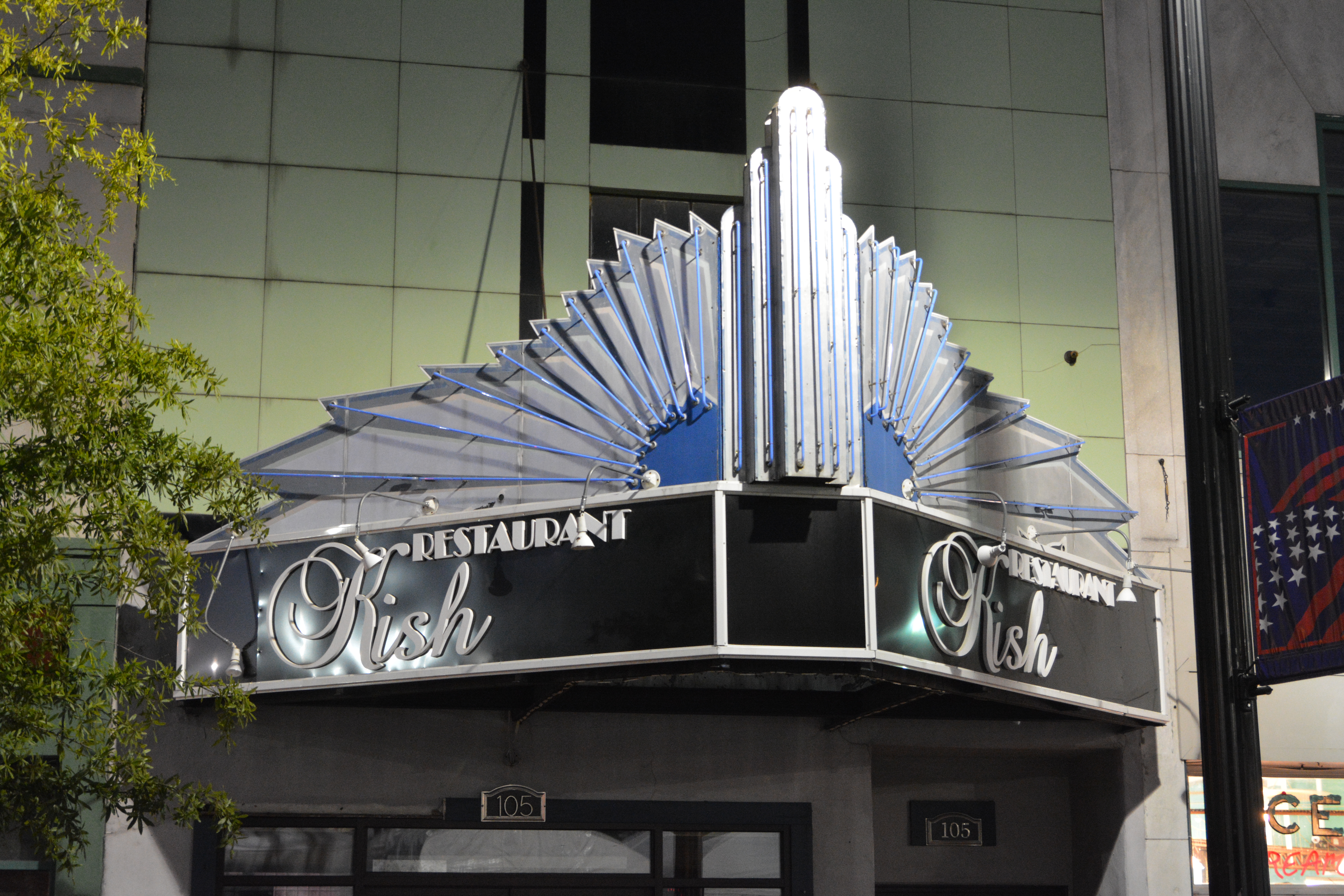
Art deco restaurant

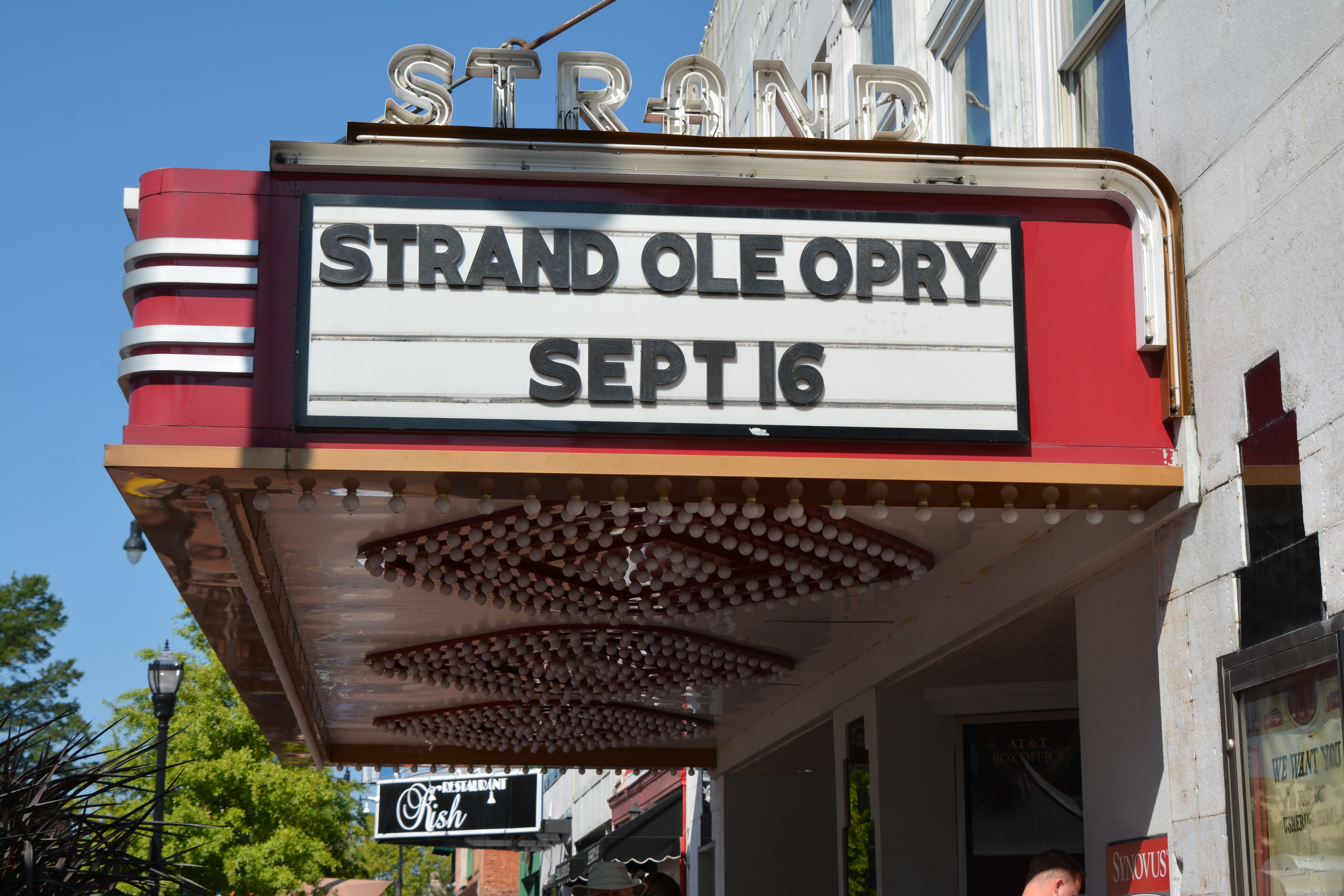
Strand Theatre

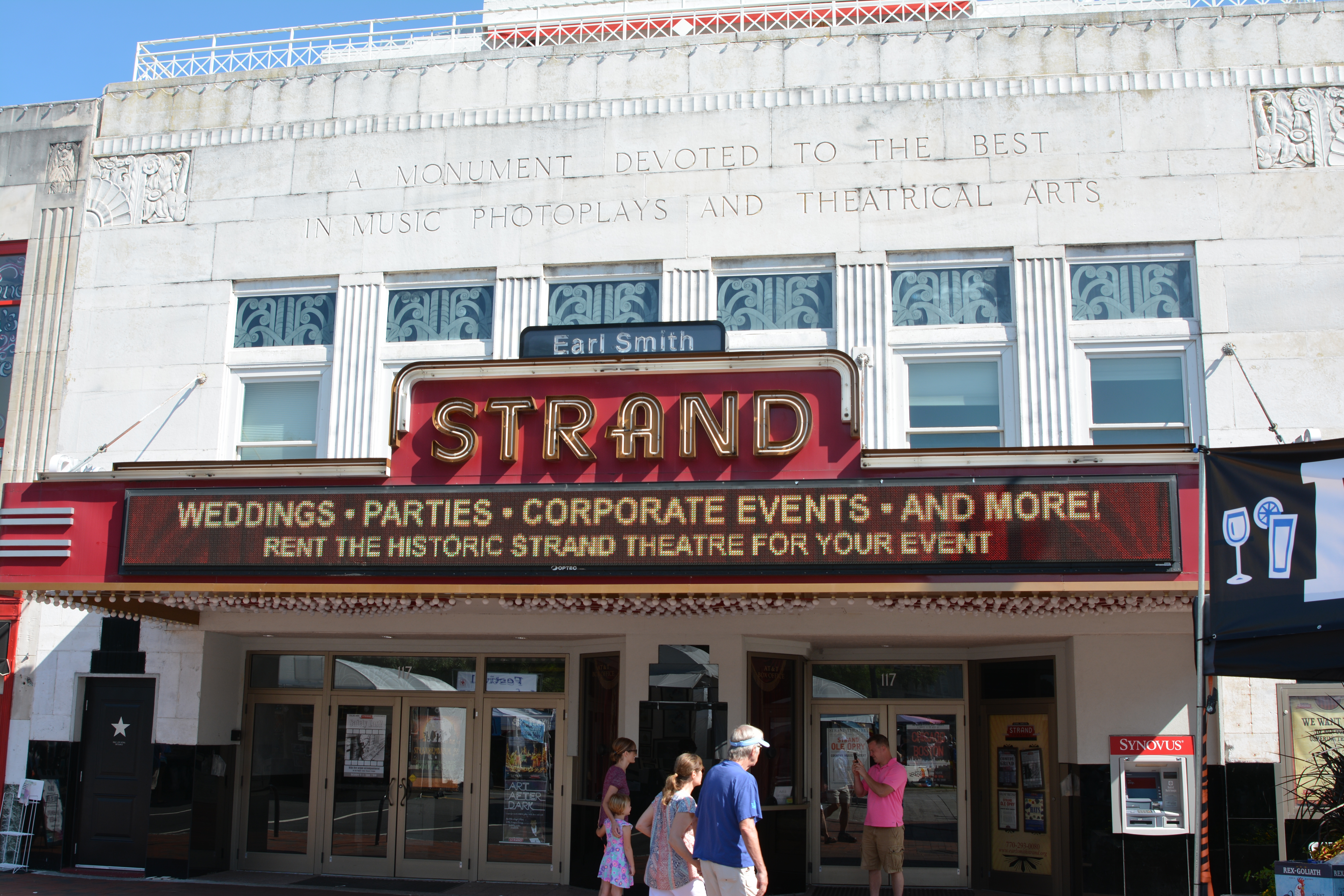
Strand Theatre

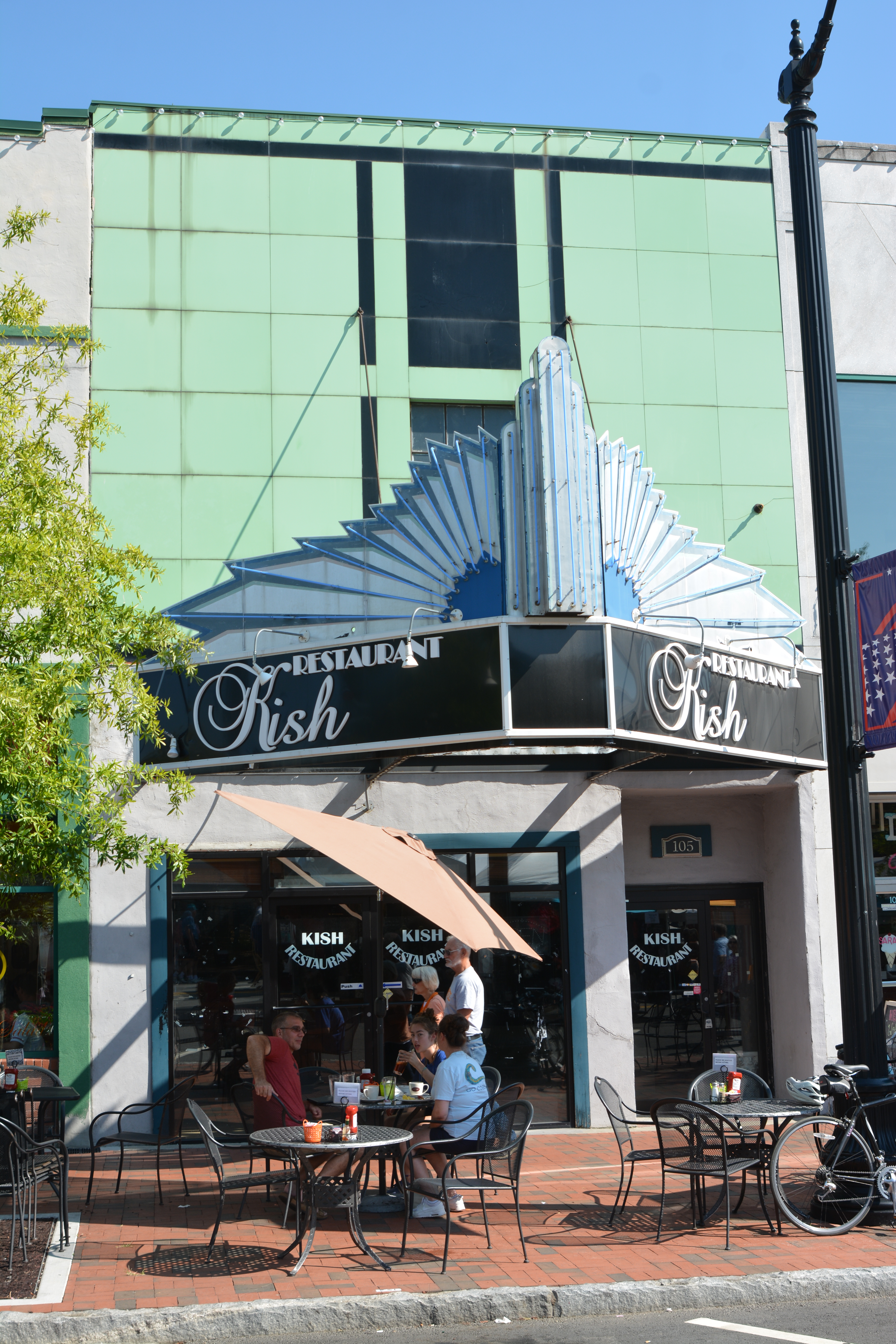
Art deco restaurant

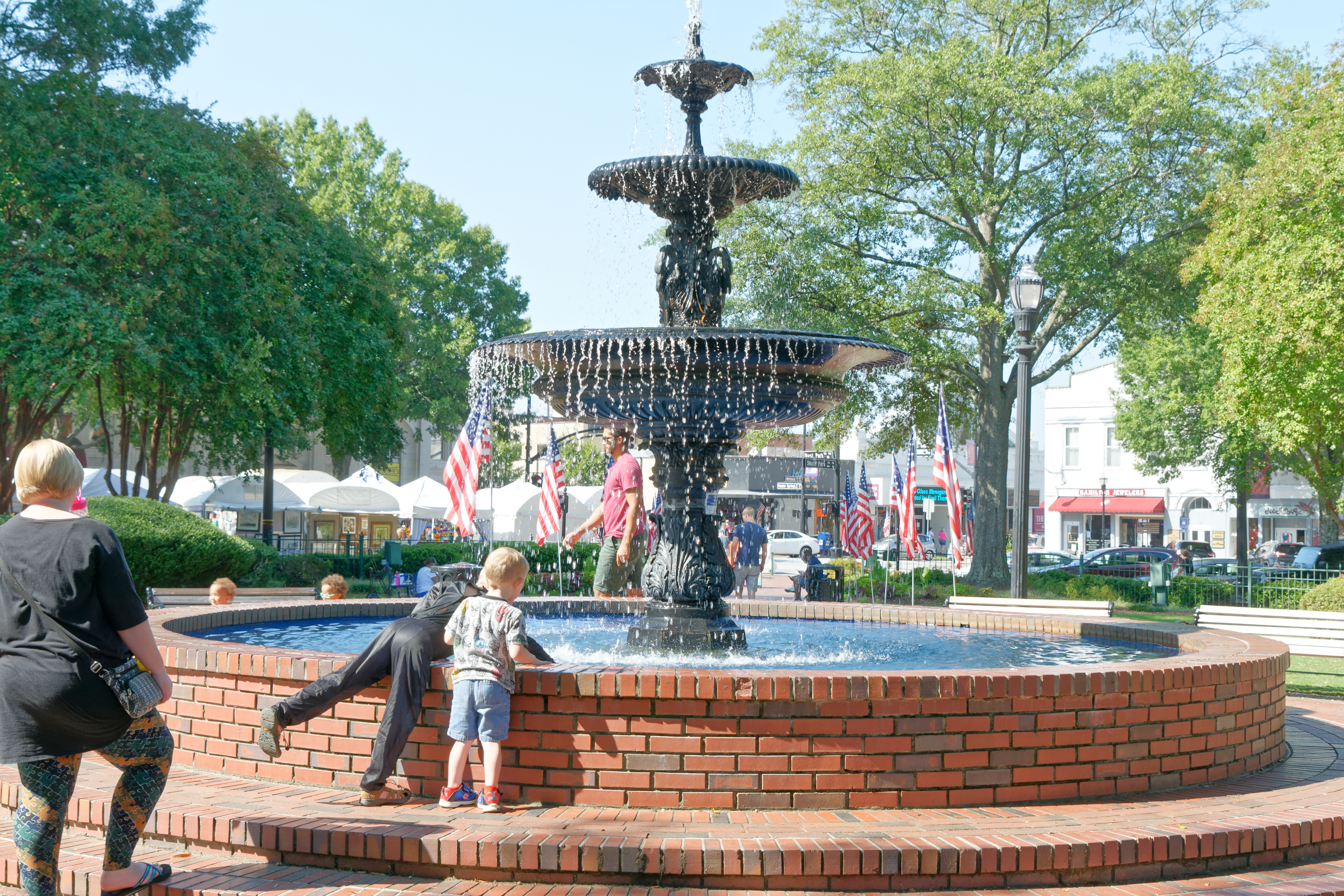
Fountain

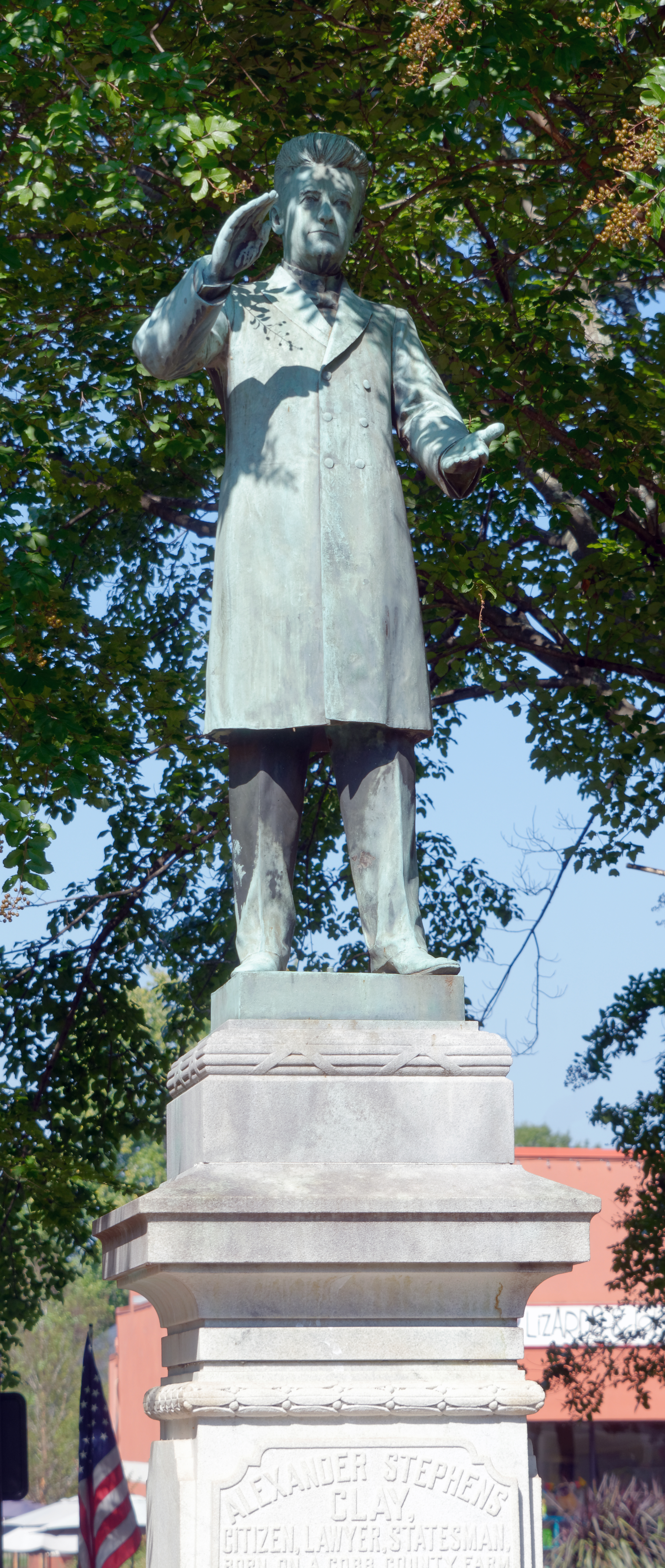
Statue of Alexander Clay
