= Guadalcanal Diary (band) =

American band

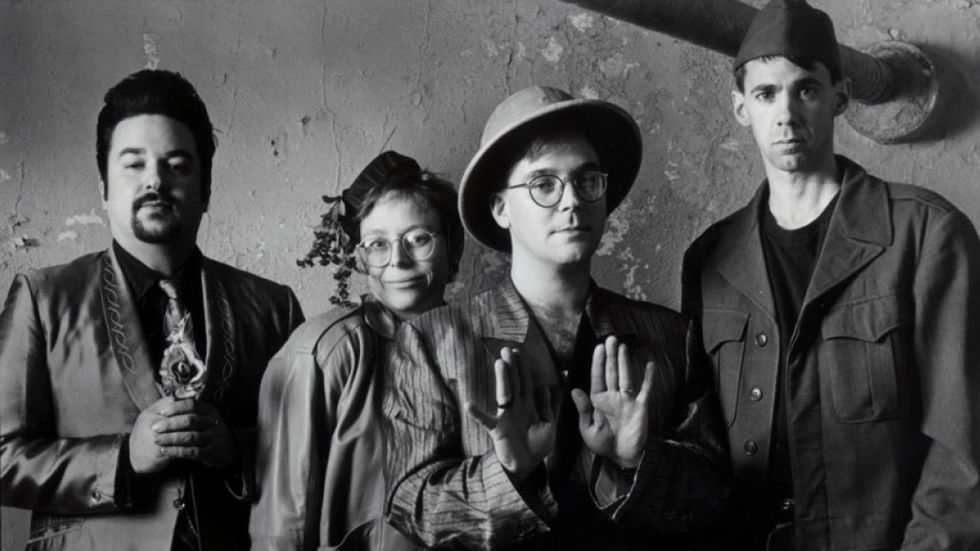

Background information
- Genres: Alternative rock; jangle pop; college rock
- Years active: 1981–1989, 1997–2000, 2011
- Labels: EOD; DB Records; Elektra Records; Rhino Handmade; Omnivore
- Members: Murray Attaway; Jeff Walls; Rhett Crowe; John Poe

Guadalcanal Diary was an American alternative jangle pop rock group who originated in Marietta, Georgia. The band formed in 1981, released four major label albums and disbanded in 1989. They reformed in 1997, releasing a live album, but never again recorded new material. After going on hiatus in 2000, Guadalcanal Diary temporarily reunited for a second time in 2011 for Athfest, where they celebrated their 30th anniversary.

== History ==
Murray Attaway and Jeff Walls became friends in high school, and had played together in a punk band called Strictly American which also included Curtis Crowe, the future drummer of Pylon. The two decided to form a new band under the name Emergency Broadcast System. At the time, Attaway's close friend Rhett Crowe, the sister of Curtis, was learning to play bass with guidance from Walls and joined the new band which became Guadalcanal Diary, referencing the 1943 war memoir of that same name. After auditioning several drummers, Walls enlisted multi-instrumentalist John Poe who agreed to play drums "temporarily", but stayed permanently. This lineup continued throughout the band's career. Guadalcanal Diary quickly attracted attention with its frequent live shows in the Athens and Atlanta music scenes and throughout the Southeast. In 1983, they recorded and released a four-song EP called Watusi Rodeo on a small Atlanta indie label called Entertainment On Disc. (The song "Watusi Rodeo" was not included on this release as Attaway hadn't written it yet.)

In 1984, the band signed with DB Records (a small independent label based out of the Wax 'N Facts record store in Atlanta) and began recording with Don Dixon, releasing its first full-length record, Walking in the Shadow of the Big Man. The album was well received by critics and enjoyed significant airplay on US college radio stations, drawing comparisons to fellow Georgia band R.E.M. A video for the song "Watusi Rodeo" was created by Warren Chilton, a long-time friend of the band and later its personal manager. The video received significant airplay on MTV even after losing the network's "Basement Tapes" competition. After touring heavily across the United States in support of their debut album, the band was signed by Elektra Records in 1985. Elektra wanted to immediately record and release new material, but the band convinced the label to first re-release Walking in the Shadow of the Big Man due to the feeling that the initial DB release had not had wide enough distribution.

In 1986, Guadalcanal Diary released its second album, Jamboree, produced by Rodney Mills and Steve Nye. The album's initial reception was not as enthusiastic as their debut effort, with some critics noting a weaker production; nevertheless, the album gained retrospective appreciation among fans. They decided to work again with producer Don Dixon for their next album, 2X4, released in 1987. Featuring a harder-hitting sound and greater diversity among the songs, it became the band's most successful album up to that time. It was listed as number 64 on Paste Magazine's "The 80 Best Albums of the 1980s", wherein it was called a "masterpiece". The track "Litany (Life Goes On)", became a minor alternative rock hit and remains one of the band's most well-known songs and also had a music video.

In 1988, Jeff Walls and Rhett Crowe married, and Rhett gave birth to a daughter, Lillian, the following year. After recording again with Don Dixon, 1989 saw the release of the band's fourth and final studio album, Flip-Flop. While the music video for "Always Saturday" saw rotation on MTV, critics noted that the album lacked some of the consistency of their previous albums, perhaps due to the band's busy touring schedule. However, with all members contributing to the songwriting, it took on a more diverse and upbeat sound, compared to darker themes of their previous works. "...Vista", a song inspired by a campfire chant from Rhett Crowe's childhood, and John Poe's "Pretty Is As Pretty Does" each became a fan favorite. Due to new family commitments and exhaustion from heavy touring, the band began to drift apart; they chose to break up in order to preserve their friendships. In the early fall of 1989, they played their collective final show in a free performance at Legion Field on the University of Georgia campus, and organized by the Tau Epsilon Phi fraternity's Nu Chapter.

In late 1989, Murray Attaway was signed as a solo artist to Geffen Records. He began recording with producer Tony Berg in 1992, along with various guest musicians, including Jackson Browne, Aimee Mann, Benmont Tench, and Nicky Hopkins. In 1993, His only solo album, In Thrall, was released, and received critical praise. Despite Geffen's high budget and innovative promotional tactics, including the giving away of the first 50,000 copies, the album fared less well commercially than Guadalcanal's releases.

In the same period:

- Jeff Walls produced, and played guitar, on numerous local records,
- John Poe briefly pursued a solo career, and
- Rhett Crowe retired from music, citing a desire to spend more time with her family.

Attaway began recording for his second solo album in 1995, and invited his former bandmates to contribute, but (concurrent to a change in A&R personnel) Attaway negotiated a release from Geffen, and the recordings were shelved.

The band's members describe enjoying their working together again, and decided in 1997 to re-form Guadalcanal Diary temporarily. They played a handful of local shows, and self-released a live album, At Your Birthday Party, in 1999.

In 2000, they again ceased activity, leaving open the possibility another revival. In 2009, perceiving increasing online demand for new music and shows, Murray Attaway and Jeff Walls formed a band, Bomber City, as an outlet to play their large backlog of solo material and favorite Guadalcanal Diary songs, and in 2011 — formed Blasting Cap.

In 2011, Guadalcanal Diary briefly reunited to play Athfest, and celebrated their 30th anniversary there.

Jeff Walls died, May 29, 2019, of a rare pulmonary disease.

== Members ==
- Murray Attaway – vocals, guitar
- Jeff Walls – guitar
- Rhett Crowe – bass
- John Poe – drums

== Discography ==
=== Albums ===
Year	Album	Label
1983	Watusi Rodeo EP	EOD
1984	Walking in the Shadow of the Big Man	Elektra
1986	Jamboree	Elektra
1987	2X4	Elektra
1989	Flip-Flop	Elektra
1999	At Your Birthday Party	Guadco, Omnivore

=== Singles ===
Year	Title	Album
1985	Trail of Tears	Walking in the Shadow of the Big Man
1985	Watusi Rodeo	Walking in the Shadow of the Big Man
1986	Lonely Street	Jamboree
1986	Spirit Train/Cattle Prod	Jamboree
1987	Litany (Life Goes On)	2X4
1987	Get Over It	2X4
1987	Lips Of Steel	2X4
1989	Always Saturday/Kiss Of Fire	Flip-Flop
1989	Pretty Is As Pretty Does	Flip-Flop
