= In Thrall =

Studio album by Murray Attaway
- Released: 1993
- Genre: Rock
- Length: 48:10
- Label: Geffen
- Producer: Tony Berg

In Thrall is the debut solo studio album by American musician Murray Attaway, released in 1993. Geffen Records sent 40,000 free copies to retailers as a promotional effort. Attaway supported the album by touring with Robyn Hitchcock. He recorded a second album for Geffen that the company declined to release.

== Production ==
The album was produced by Tony Berg. Attaway began working on the songs in 1989, after the dissolution of Guadalcanal Diary. "Under Jets" is about the military and growing up close to Dobbins Air Reserve Base. Jim Keltner, Aimee Mann, and Nicky Hopkins were among the many musicians who contributed to the album.

== Critical reception ==
Professional ratings
Review scores
| Source | Rating |
|---|---|
| AllMusic | 4.5/5 stars |
| Calgary Herald | B− |
| Entertainment Weekly | B− |
| The Indianapolis Star | 2.5/4 stars |

The Indianapolis Star noted that "a few songs appear contrived here, and the noticeable sardonic flavor of past work along with usual guitar blasts is sorely missed." Trouser Press opined that "the carefully wrought In Thrall comes across a bit more tepid than its title, leaving the conviction of Attaway's observations easier to believe in than his music." Entertainment Weekly concluded that the album's "pleasant jangle and strum and its songs' subject matter—nostalgia for smalltown America—also call to mind some shadowy aspects of his Athens, Ga., hometown peers R.E.M."

The Calgary Herald said that "Attaway's high nasal Larry Gowan-like vocals ... help polish the raw sound and make it well, almost pop-rock." The Washington Post determined that "the fancier settings don't fundamentally alter Attaway's tunes, which are erratic, or his lyrics, which can be overwrought or simply opaque." Rolling Stone stated that Berg "surrounds Attaway's yearning tenor and guitar-based arrangements with cellos, mandolins, headphone-geared sound effects and cheesy keyboards that create haunting atmospheres."

== Track listing ==
1. "No Tears Tonight" – 3:56
2. "Under Jets" – 3:54
3. "Allegory" – 5:46
4. "Angels in the Trees" – 4:15
5. "Living in Another Time" – 3:17
6. "The Evensong" – 4:07
7. "Fall So Far" – 4:03
8. "August Rain" – 6:00
9. "Walpurgis Night" – 4:09
10. "My Book" – 4:48
11. "Home" – 3:43

== Personnel ==
Musicians

- Murray Attaway – vocals, guitar
- Alex Acuña – percussion
- Tony Berg – casio, guitar, percussion, tamboura
- Robbie Blunt – guitar
- Jon Brion – bass, guitar, mellotron, piano, vibraphone
- Jackson Browne – background vocals
- David Coleman – electric viola
- Gary Ferguson – drums
- Nicky Hopkins – organ, piano
- Jim Keltner – drums
- Aimee Mann – background vocals
- David Mansfield – mandocello, mandolin, violin
- Pat Mastelotto – drums, percussion
- Steve Nieve – wurlitzer
- Sid Page – violin
- Eric Pressly – bass
- Steven Soles – background vocals
- Benmont Tench – organ
- Patrick Warren – chamberlain, keyboards

Technicians

- Martin Brumbach – mixing
- Paul Dieter – assistant engineer
- Greg Goldman – engineer
- James Guthrie – mixing
- Chris Lord-Alge – engineer
- Bob Ludwig – mastering
- Casey McMackin – engineer
- Brian Scheuble – engineer
- Joel Stoner – engineer
- Robert Fisher – art direction, design
- Amy Guip – photography
- Dennis Keeley – photography
