= Marietta City Schools (Georgia) =

School district in Georgia (U.S. state)

Marietta City School District

Address
- 250 Howard Street Marietta, Georgia, 30060-1953; United States
- Coordinates: 33.956395°N 84.528013°W

District information
- Grades: Pre-school – 12
- Established: 1892
- Superintendent: Grant Rivera
- Accreditations: Southern Association of Colleges and Schools; Georgia Accrediting Commission
- NCES District ID: 1303510

Students and staff
- Students: 8,599 (2020-2021)
- Teachers: 654.80 (FTE)
- Student–teacher ratio: 13.13

Other information
- Telephone: (770) 422-3500
- Fax: (770) 425-4095
- Website: marietta-city.org

The Marietta City School District is the school district which operates the public schools in Marietta, Georgia, United States. It is the only school district in Cobb County which operates its schools separately from the Cobb County School District, the other school district in the county. Its boundaries are that of the city boundaries.

Founded in 1892, classes began that year on Labor Day at four schools. It now consists of one high school, a middle school, a sixth grade academy and several neighborhood elementary schools.

== Board of education ==
The following are the parts of the City Of Marietta Government Schools Department Board of Education

- Jeff DeJarnett (ward 1)
- Jason Waters (Board Vice Chair and ward 2)
- A.B. Almy (ward 3)
- Jailene Hunter (ward 4)
- Angela Orange (ward 5)
- Kerry Minervini (Board Chair and ward 6)
- Irene Berens (ward 7)

== Schools ==
=== Elementary schools ===
- A.L. Burruss Elementary School
- Dunleith Elementary School
- Hickory Hills Elementary School
- Lockheed Elementary School
- Marietta Center for Advanced Academics
- Park Street Elementary School
- Sawyer Road Elementary School
- West Side Elementary School

=== Middle schools ===
- Marietta Middle School (grades 7-8)
- Marietta Sixth-Grade Academy

=== High school ===
- Marietta High School
  - College and Career Academy
  - Woods Wilkins Campus
    - Blended Learning Program
      - Marietta Performance Learning Center
    - Marietta Evening School
    - Marietta Alternative Programs and Services (MAPS) program

=== Other Schools ===
- Early Learning Center
  - Emily Lembeck Early Learning Center
