= 2×4 (Guadalcanal Diary album) =

Studio album by Guadalcanal Diary
- Released: 1987
- Recorded: 1985–87
- Genre: Alternative
- Length: 43:16
- Label: Elektra
- Producer: Don Dixon

Guadalcanal Diary chronology
Jamboree (1986)	2×4 (1987)	Flip-Flop (1989)

Singles from 2×4
- 1. "Litany (Life Goes On)" Released: 1987; 2. "Get Over It" Released: 1987; 3. "Lips of Steel" Released: 1987

2×4 is the third album by Guadalcanal Diary. It was released in 1987.

The album peaked at No. 183 on the Billboard 200.

== Critical reception ==
Professional ratings
Review scores
Source	Rating
AllMusic	4.5/5 stars
The Encyclopedia of Popular Music	4/5 stars
New Musical Express	3/10

Trouser Press called the album "smashing," writing that the band members "dip into their shadowy art-rock pasts ... to finally create music as distinctive as the lyrics."

AllMusic wrote that 2×4 "sounds like the group's strongest and most confident album." Paste included the album at No. 64 on its list of "The 80 Best Albums of the 1980s".

== Track listing ==
1. "Litany (Life Goes On)" (Attaway) – 3:41
2. "Under the Yoke" (Walls) – 4:28
3. "Get over It" (Attaway/Crowe) – 3:00
4. "Little Birds" (Attaway) – 3:57
5. "Things Fall Apart" (Attaway/Poe/Walls) – 2:44
6. "Let the Big Wheel Roll" (Walls) – 2:40
7. "And Your Bird Can Sing" (Lennon–McCartney) – 2:07
8. "Where Angels Fear to Tread" (Walls) – 3:13
9. "Newborn" (Attaway) – 4:41
10. "Winds of Change" (Walls) – 2:55
11. "Say Please" (Attaway) – 2:10
12. "3 AM" (Attaway/Walls) – 4:12
13. "Lips of Steel" (Attaway/Walls) – 3:28

== Bonus tracks ==
1. "Home [Joe Blaney Mix]" – 2:42
2. "Shango" – 4:29
3. "It's Time" – 2:30
4. "Carrying the Torch (demo version)" – 2:56
5. "Just an Excuse (demo version)" – 3:03
6. "Lips of Steel (demo version)" – 3:36
7. "Under the Yoke (demo version)" – 3:04
8. "Winds of Change (demo version)" – 3:21
9. "Get Over It (demo version)" – 2:18
10. "3 A.M. (demo version)" – 3:53
11. "Tutti-Frutti (demo version)" – 1:52

== Personnel ==
- Terry Allen – photography
- Murray Attaway – guitar, harmonica, vocals
- Joe Blaney – mixing
- Rhett Crowe – bass guitar
- Don Dixon – producer
- Guadalcanal Diary – artwork
- George Pappas – engineer
- John Poe – drums, vocals
- Dan Vaganek – engineer
- Jeff Walls – guitar, keyboards, vocals, kalimba, lap steel guitar

== Charts ==
Chart (1988)	Peak position
US Billboard 200	183
