= Watusi Rodeo =

EP by Guadalcanal Diary
- Released: 1983
- Genre: Jangle pop
- Label: DB Records

Guadalcanal Diary chronology
Watusi Rodeo (1983)	Walking in the Shadow of the Big Man (1984)

Professional ratings
Review scores
Source	Rating
AllMusic	3.5/5 stars

Watusi Rodeo is the debut independent EP from the American jangle pop group Guadalcanal Diary. It was released in 1983 on DB Records. The EP was included by Rhino Handmade on the same CD as the reissue of the band's debut LP, Walking in the Shadow of the Big Man.

A song by the band called "Watusi Rodeo" (not included here) appears on their subsequent debut LP Walking in the Shadow of the Big Man, and was often used to close the band's live performances.

== Track listing ==
1. "Michael Rockefeller" (Murray Attaway) – 4:52
2. "Liwa Wechi" (Miriam Makeba) – 2:50
3. "I Wish I Killed John Wayne" (Attaway, Walls) – 3:20
4. "Dead Eyes" (Attaway, Walls) – 3:12
