= Walking in the Shadow of the Big Man =

Studio album by Guadalcanal Diary
- Released: 1984
- Recorded: September 1984; Axis Studios, Atlanta, GA
- Genre: Alternative rock, jangle pop
- Length: 31:16
- Label: Elektra
- Producer: Don Dixon

Guadalcanal Diary chronology
Watusi Rodeo EP (1983)	Walking in the Shadow of the Big Man (1984)	Jamboree (1986)

Singles from Walking in the Shadow of the Big Man
- 1. "Trail of Tears" Released: 1985; 2. "Watusi Rodeo" Released: 1985

Walking in the Shadow of the Big Man is the first full-length album by Marietta, Georgia, band Guadalcanal Diary. The album was released in 1984 and was produced by Don Dixon. It was reissued on CD by Rhino Handmade in 2003, with additional tracks from the Watusi Rodeo EP, the B-side "Johnny B. Goode," and the previously unreleased track "Just an Excuse."

== Critical reception ==
Professional ratings
Review scores
Source	Rating
AllMusic	3.5/5 stars
The Encyclopedia of Popular Music	3/5 stars
Tiny Mix Tapes	4.5/5 stars

Trouser Press wrote that the album "presents rocking explorations of several of [singer Murray] Attaway’s pet themes: religious fanaticism ('Why Do the Heathen Rage?'), Civil War mythology ('Trail of Tears') and spontaneous human combustion ('Fire from Heaven')." The Sun Sentinel called it "solid, melodic rock 'n' roll," writing that "thundering drums and tough-talking guitars frame lyrics that condemn war and imperialism."

== Track listing ==
1. "Trail of Tears" - 2:24
2. "Fire from Heaven" - 3:52
3. "Sleepers Awake" - 3:10
4. "Gilbert Takes the Wheel" (instrumental) - 2:32
5. "Ghost on the Road" - 2:47
6. "Watusi Rodeo" - 2:36
7. "Why do the Heathen Rage?" - 3:04
8. "Pillow Talk" - 1:57
9. "Walking in the Shadow of the Big Man (Part 1)" (instrumental) - 4:34
10. "Kum-Ba-Yah (live)" - 3:40

=== Bonus tracks on Limited Edition ===
1. "Johnny B. Goode" - 3:45
2. "Michael Rockefeller" - 4:55
3. "Liwa Wechi" - 2:51
4. "John Wayne" - 3:11
5. "Dead Eyes" - 3:19
6. "Just an Excuse" - 2:53
