= Flip-Flop (album) =

Studio album by Guadalcanal Diary
- Released: 1989
- Genre: Rock
- Label: Elektra
- Producer: Don Dixon

Guadalcanal Diary chronology
2X4 (1987)	Flip-Flop (1989)	At Your Birthday Party (live) (1999)

Singles from Flip-Flop
- 1. "Always Saturday" Released: 1989

Flip-Flop is the fourth and final studio album by the American band Guadalcanal Diary. It was released in 1989 on Elektra Records. The band supported the album with a North American tour. "Always Saturday", for which a video was shot, was released as a single.

== Production ==
The album was produced by Don Dixon. Drummer John Poe wrote several of the album's songs. "Ten Laws" was inspired by Joseph Campbell's Myths to Live By.

== Critical reception ==
Professional ratings
Review scores
Source	Rating
AllMusic	3/5 stars
Chicago Tribune	3/4 stars
Houston Chronicle	3.5/5 stars

The Los Angeles Times wrote: "One of the most underrated, overlooked and inaccurately compared to R.E.M. bands around doesn't offer much to change that on its fourth album." The Northwest Florida Daily News deemed the album "artsy rock 'n' roll" that "doesn't stray too far from homespun melodies and twangy guitars."

The Toronto Star called it "raucous, energizing, intelligent guitar rock." The Gazette determined that the album finds the band "working some of the melancholy out of singer Murray Attaway's vocals." The Chicago Tribune labeled Flip-Flop "terrific mainstream rock, a shade quirkier than John Mellencamp or Tom Petty but no less deserving of Top 40 status."

== Track listing ==
1. "Look Up!" – 2:33
2. "Always Saturday" – 4:15
3. "The Likes of You" – 3:06
4. "Barometer" – 4:07
5. "Happy Home" – 2:53
6. "Whiskey Talk" – 3:36
7. "Pretty Is as Pretty Does" – 4:08
8. "Everything but Good Luck" – 2:53
9. "Ten Laws" – 3:44
10. "Fade Out" – 4:59
11. "...Vista" – 3:05
