= Jamboree (Guadalcanal Diary album) =

Studio album by Guadalcanal Diary
- Released: 1986
- Label: Elektra
- Producer: Rodney Mills, Steve Nye

Guadalcanal Diary chronology
Walking in the Shadow of the Big Man (1984)	Jamboree (1986)	2X4 (1987)

Singles from Jamboree
- 1. "Lonely Street" Released: 1986; 2. "Spirit Train / Cattle Prod" Released: 1986

Jamboree is the second album by the American band Guadalcanal Diary. It was released in 1986 on Elektra Records. The band supported the album with a North American tour. "I See Moe" references the Three Stooges.

== Critical reception ==
Professional ratings
Review scores
Source	Rating
AllMusic	3.5/5 stars

The Chicago Tribune called the album "low on flash and affectation" and "a thoughtfully crafted, guitar-based effort." The Miami Herald wrote: "The Jamboree songs are short and direct, with a glinting rawness that sharpens their impact. While they don't all contain radio-ready hooks, each rings with confident musicianship and a clearly stated point of view." The San Diego Union-Tribune opined that "the elaborate recording of Jamboree has had somewhat mixed results, with the final product (two songs were remixed later in New York) lacking some of the snap and crackle of the Don Dixon-produced Big Man."

== Track listing ==
1. "Pray for Rain" – 4:06
2. "Fear of God" – 3:22
3. "Jamboree" – 3:17
4. "Michael Rockefeller" – 4:50
5. "Spirit Train" – 3:00
6. "Lonely Street" – 2:37
7. "Country Club Gun" – 2:26
8. "T.R.O.U.B.L.E." – 3:17
9. "I See Moe" – 1:28
10. "Please Stop Me" – 2:42
11. "Dead Eyes" – 2:59
12. "Cattle Prod" – 2:58
