= Marietta High School (Georgia) =

Public high school in Marietta, Georgia, United States

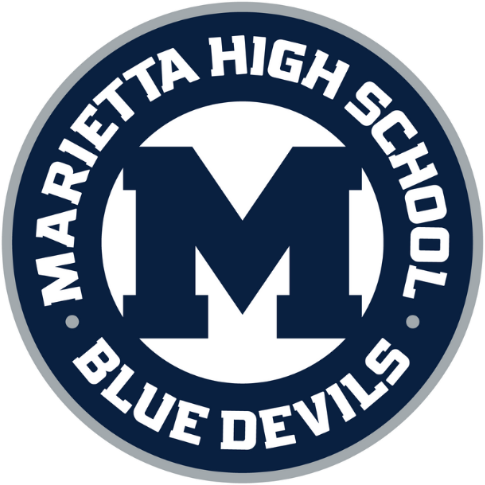

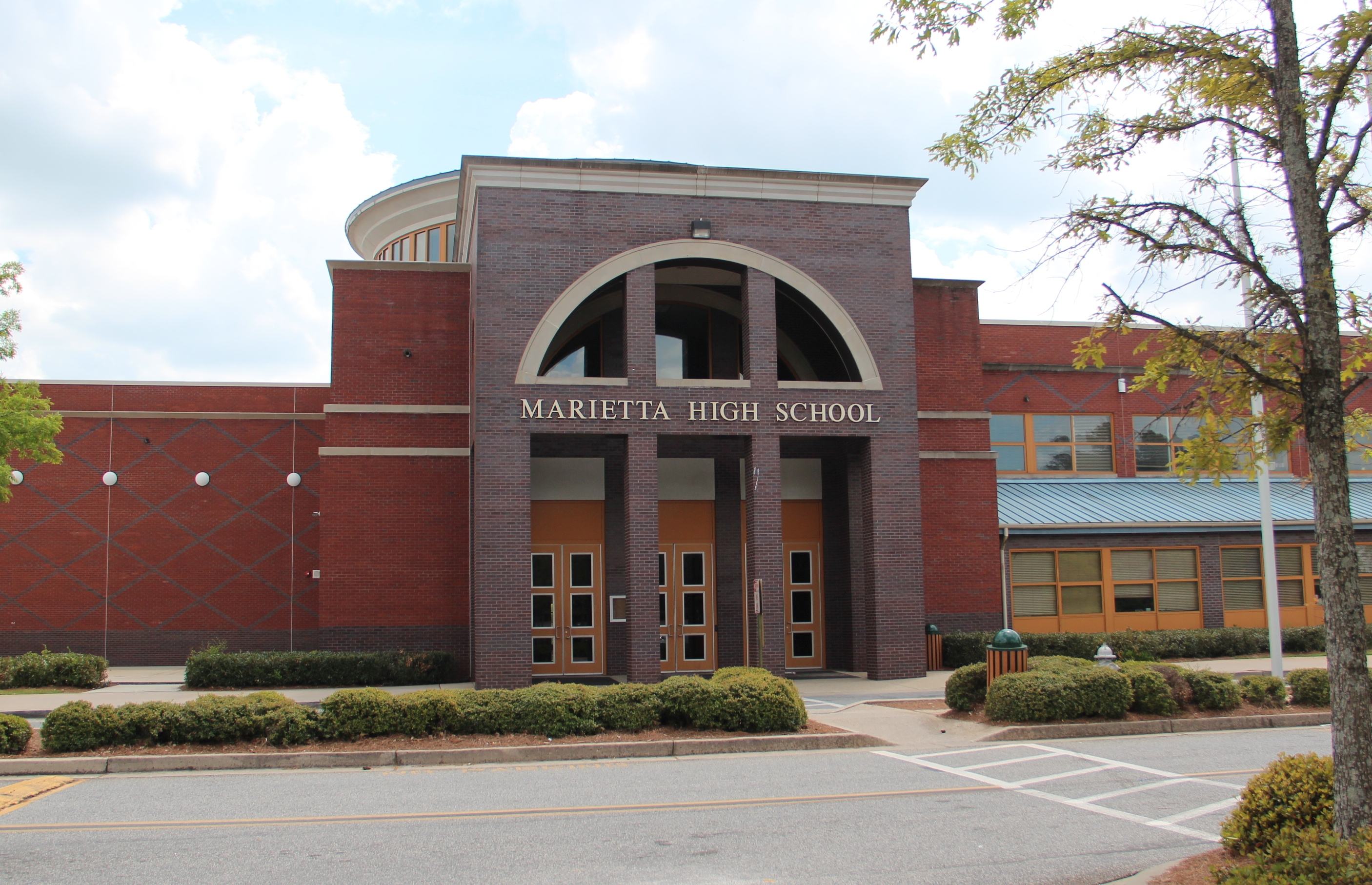
- Marietta High School in 2017

Location
- 1171 Whitlock Avenue; Marietta, Georgia 30064; United States; 33°56′52″N 84°35′08″W

Information
- Type: Public secondary
- Established: 1892
- School district: Marietta City Schools
- Principal: Marvin Crumbs
- Teaching staff: 169.10 (FTE)
- Grades: 9–12
- Enrollment: 2,654 (2023–2024)
- Student to teacher ratio: 15.69
- Campus: Suburban
- Colors: Navy blue, silver, and white
- Nickname: Blue Devils
- Rivals: McEachern High School
- Newspaper: The Pitchfork
- Yearbook: The Olympian
- Website: marietta-city.org/mhs

Marietta High School is a public high school in Marietta, Georgia, United States, part of the Marietta City School District as the only high school inside the city limits. The school's mascot is the Blue Devil.

== History ==
In 1886, The Macon Telegraph announced that all but $700 of the $7,000 needed to build Marietta High School had been raised. Marietta High School opened in the fall of 1892. In 1896, the school's fourth graduation ceremony took place. In 1900, the graduating class had twelve members.

The school had six locations, including Kennesaw Avenue, Waterman Street, Lemon Street, and Haynes Street. It moved to the Winn Street location in 1924. In 2001, the school moved to its current location on 1171 Whitlock Avenue SW with a new $55 million state-of-the-art facility on 60 acres. The cost of the new school was a surprise to voters who had approved a bond for a $35 million school.

Gabe Carmona served as principal until 2018, when he moved to North Paulding High School.

On June 7, 2022, the school's former principal, Keith Ball, was removed from his role of four years after a narrow vote by the school board. He transferred to a role at the district's central office later that month.

Dr. Eric Holland was appointed as principal of MHS on July 13, 2022, by the MCS Board of Education. He later accepted a superintendent role at his former employer, Rome City Schools, and an interim principal, Marco Holland, was named for the 2022–2023 school year.

== Students ==
Marietta has approximately 2,600 students in grades 9 through 12. The racial makeup of the student body in 2021–2022 was 38.2% Black, 37.5% Hispanic, 19.1% White, 4.3% two or more races, and 1.4% Asian.

== Sports ==
- Basketball: State champions in 1983 and 1999. Coach Charlie Hood led the Blue Devils from 1972 to 2009, accumulating over 700 wins, with only two losing seasons.
- Cross country:
  - The boys' team was state champions in 2014, 2015, 2020, and 2022. They were region champions in 2008, 2009, 2010, 2012, 2013, 2014,2015,2019,2020,2021 and 2022. They were the 2015 NXN Southeast Champions.
  - The girls were state champions in 2017, 2018, 2020,2021 and 2022. They were region champions in 2021.
- Football: Won the North Georgia championship in 1966–1967. Won the state Class AAA championship in 1967. They had several district and regional championships between 1921 and 2005. The Marietta High School football team was crowned Georgia's 7-A 2019 football champions.
- Golf: won the 1970 State Championship with a 5-foot putt made by Marietta High School Hall of Famer Chuck Little.
- Tennis: State Champions in 1990; the 1980 boys' tennis team won the State Championship. In 1983, Lyn Huffstutler and Kelly Townsend won the girls' 5AAAA region doubles tennis championship.
- Track and Field: The team won the boys' state championship in 2006 and was runner-up in 2005 and 2007. They also had state championship wins in 2000, 2001, 2005, 2008 and 2022. Shadi Dix was the 110 hurdles State Champ in 2005.
- Wrestling: Lisa Glymph won the 2021 women's state championship. Malachi Sanders won the 2022 155lb state championship

== Notable alumni ==
- Murray Attaway, musician
- Harrison Bailey, American football player
- Benjamin Bottoms, United States Coast Guardsman
- Jim Cagle, American football player
- Mike Edwards, editor, writer, senior editor for National Geographic
- Dale Ellis, basketball player
- Patrick Ewing Jr., basketball player
- Arik Gilbert, American football player
- Dearica Hamby, basketball player
- Cedric Henderson, basketball player
- Jaylen Hill, American football player
- Tyler Hughes, American football player
- Anthony Jennings, American football player
- Ramel Keyton, American football player
- Izaiyah Nelson, basketball player
- Azeez Ojulari, American football player
- BJ Ojulari, American football player
- Carlson Reed, baseball player
- Angel Robinson, basketball player
- Rex Robinson, American football player
- Billy Joe Royal, singer
- Richard Shelton, American football player
- Traye Simmons, American football player
- Scott Sisson, American football player
- Dansby Swanson, baseball player
- Luke Thomas, sports journalist
- Kimani Vidal, American football player
- Ricky White, American football player
- Joanne Woodward, actress
- Eric Zeier, American football player
