= National Register of Historic Places listings in Orangeburg County, South Carolina =

Location of Orangeburg County in South Carolina

This is a list of the National Register of Historic Places listings in Orangeburg County, South Carolina.

This is intended to be a complete list of the properties and districts on the National Register of Historic Places in Orangeburg County, South Carolina, United States. The locations of National Register properties and districts for which the latitude and longitude coordinates are included below, may be seen in a map.

There are 42 properties and districts listed on the National Register in the county. Another 2 properties were once listed but have been removed.

This National Park Service list is complete through NPS recent listings posted March 21, 2025.

== Current listings ==
	Name on the Register	Image	Date listed	Location	City or town	Description
1	All Star Bowling Lane	All Star Bowling Lane	August 7, 1996 (#96000837)	559 E. Russell St. 33°29′34″N 80°51′34″W	Orangeburg	Protest against the bowling center's segregationist policy in 1968 led to the Orangeburg massacre in which 3 were killed
2	Amelia Street Historic District		September 20, 1985 (#85002322)	Amelia St. between Treadwell St. and Summers Ave. 33°29′39″N 80°51′37″W	Orangeburg	
3	F.H.W. Briggman House	F.H.W. Briggman House	September 20, 1985 (#85002337)	156 Amelia St. 33°29′25″N 80°51′56″W	Orangeburg	
4	Donald Bruce House	Donald Bruce House	December 1, 1978 (#78002528)	Southeast of Orangeburg on U.S. Route 301; 33°28′36″N 80°48′53″W	Orangeburg	
5	Cattle Creek Campground		May 19, 1983 (#83002204)	Off South Carolina Highway 210; 33°19′20″N 80°45′08″W	Rowesville	
6	Claflin College Historic District	Claflin College Historic District	September 20, 1985 (#85002324)	On a portion of the Claflin College campus 33°29′51″N 80°51′18″W	Orangeburg	
7	Cope Depot	Cope Depot	March 29, 2001 (#01000298)	Cope Rd. 33°22′40″N 81°00′28″W	Cope	
8	Dantzler Plantation		March 1, 2007 (#07000098)	2755 Vance Rd. 33°24′56″N 80°30′23″W	Holly Hill	
9	Dixie Library Building	Dixie Library Building	September 20, 1985 (#85002336)	Corner of Bull and Middleton Sts. 33°29′33″N 80°52′05″W	Orangeburg	
10	Dukes Gymnasium	Dukes Gymnasium	September 20, 1985 (#85002321)	South Carolina State University campus 33°29′50″N 80°51′01″W	Orangeburg	
11	East Russell Street Area Historic District		September 20, 1985 (#85002335)	Along sections of E. Russell St. between Watson and Clarendon Sts., and along portions of Oakland Pl. and Dickson and Whitman Sts. 33°29′36″N 80°51′04″W	Orangeburg	
12	Ellis Avenue Historic District		September 20, 1985 (#85002327)	Along portions of Ellis Ave. between Summers Ave. and Wilson St. 33°29′53″N 80°51′47″W	Orangeburg	
13	Enterprise Cotton Mills Building	Enterprise Cotton Mills Building	September 20, 1985 (#85002340)	U.S. Route 21; 33°29′14″N 80°51′14″W	Orangeburg	
14	Eutaw Springs Battleground Park	Eutaw Springs Battleground Park	June 5, 1970 (#70000593)	2 miles east of Eutawville on South Carolina Highways 6 and 45; 33°24′30″N 80°17′57″W	Eutawville	
15	Maj. John Hammond Fordham House	Maj. John Hammond Fordham House	September 20, 1985 (#85002341)	415 Boulevard; 33°29′58″N 80°51′20″W	Orangeburg	
16	Great Branch Teacherage	Great Branch Teacherage	October 24, 2007 (#07001112)	2890 Neeses Highway; 33°31′20″N 81°00′13″W	Orangeburg	
17	Hodge Hall	Hodge Hall	September 20, 1985 (#85002320)	South Carolina State University campus 33°29′51″N 80°51′06″W	Orangeburg	
18	Holly Hill Downtown Historic District		January 9, 2024 (#100009752)	Portions of Gardner Blvd., Old State Road, and Railroad Ave. 33°19′17″N 80°24′41″W	Holly Hill	
19	Hotel Eutaw	Hotel Eutaw	September 20, 1985 (#85002318)	Russell and Centre Sts. 33°29′29″N 80°51′38″W	Orangeburg	
20	Lowman Hall, South Carolina State College	Lowman Hall, South Carolina State College	September 20, 1985 (#85002346)	South Carolina State College campus 33°29′43″N 80°51′14″W	Orangeburg	
21	Alan Mack Site (38OR67)		January 6, 1986 (#86000044)	Address Restricted	Orangeburg	
22	McCoy Farmstead		January 22, 2019 (#100003315)	307 Boyer Rd. 33°19′05″N 80°26′05″W	Holly Hill	
23	Mt. Pisgah Baptist Church	Mt. Pisgah Baptist Church	September 20, 1985 (#85002342)	310 Green; 33°29′34″N 80°51′55″W	Orangeburg	
24	Numertia Plantation	Numertia Plantation	March 19, 1982 (#82003898)	East of Eutawville; 33°23′00″N 80°16′51″W	Eutawville	
25	Orangeburg City Cemetery	Orangeburg City Cemetery	September 27, 1996 (#96001025)	Junction of Bull and Windsor Sts. 33°29′21″N 80°52′15″W	Orangeburg	
26	Orangeburg County Fair Main Exhibit Building	Orangeburg County Fair Main Exhibit Building	September 20, 1985 (#85002344)	U.S. Route 21; 33°28′49″N 80°51′10″W	Orangeburg	
27	Orangeburg County Jail	Orangeburg County Jail	October 2, 1973 (#73001724)	44 Saint John St. 33°29′22″N 80°51′42″W	Orangeburg	
28	Orangeburg Downtown Historic District	Orangeburg Downtown Historic District	September 20, 1985 (#85002317)	Russell, Broughton, Middleton, Church, Meeting, St. John, Hampton, and Amelia Sts. around the public square 33°29′24″N 80°51′49″W	Orangeburg	
29	Providence Methodist Church	Providence Methodist Church	September 25, 2009 (#08001395)	4833 Old State Rd. 33°23′33″N 80°32′26″W	Holly Hill	
30	St. Julien Plantation		November 28, 1980 (#80003693)	South Carolina Highway 6; 33°24′35″N 80°21′11″W	Eutawville	
31	South Carolina State College Historic District		June 19, 1997 (#96001024)	300 College St. 33°29′46″N 80°51′11″W	Orangeburg	
32	Southern Railway Passenger Depot	Southern Railway Passenger Depot	April 23, 1973 (#73001723)	110 N. Main St. 33°15′04″N 80°48′57″W	Branchville	
33	Springfield High School	Springfield High School	March 29, 2001 (#01000313)	Brodie St., between South Carolina Highway 4 and Georgia St. 33°29′44″N 81°16′27″W	Springfield	
34	William P. Stroman House	William P. Stroman House	August 1, 1996 (#96000836)	1017 N. Boulevard; 33°30′13″N 80°51′34″W	Orangeburg	
35	Tingley Memorial Hall, Claflin College	Tingley Memorial Hall, Claflin College	August 4, 1983 (#83002205)	College Ave. 33°29′54″N 80°51′16″W	Orangeburg	
36	Treadwell Street Historic District		September 20, 1985 (#85002315)	Along portions of Treadwell and Amelia Sts. 33°29′45″N 80°51′30″W	Orangeburg	
37	Trinity Lutheran Church	Trinity Lutheran Church	August 1, 2008 (#08000721)	390 Hampton St. 33°31′59″N 80°34′17″W	Elloree	
38	Trinity Methodist Episcopal Church	Trinity Methodist Episcopal Church	August 26, 1994 (#94001053)	185 Boulevard NE. 33°29′44″N 80°51′23″W	Orangeburg	
39	White House United Methodist Church	White House United Methodist Church	May 13, 1974 (#74001872)	Near intersection of U.S. Highway 301 and Interstate 26; 33°27′35″N 80°43′05″W	Orangeburg	
40	Whitman Street Area Historic District		September 20, 1985 (#85002326)	Along sections of Whitman, Elliot, and E. Russell Sts. 33°29′28″N 80°51′29″W	Orangeburg	
41	Williams Chapel A.M.E. Church	Williams Chapel A.M.E. Church	September 20, 1985 (#85002345)	1198 Glover St. 33°29′11″N 80°51′38″W	Orangeburg	
42	Willow Consolidated High School	Willow Consolidated High School	July 11, 2006 (#06000581)	2750 Cope Rd. 33°26′46″N 81°07′23″W	Norway	

== Former listings ==
	Name on the Register	Image	Date listed	Date removed	Location	City or town	Description
1	Gilmore House		September 19, 1988 (#88001470)	December 8, 2005	State St. & Eutaw Rd.	Holly Hill	Demolished
2	Rocks Plantation	Rocks Plantation	July 13, 1976 (#76001709)	March 15, 2005	Near SC Highway 6	Eutawville	Destroyed by fire in March, 1992.

== See also ==
- List of National Historic Landmarks in South Carolina
- National Register of Historic Places listings in South Carolina
