= Sweden, South Carolina =

Unincorporated community in South Carolina, US

Coordinates: 33°22′45″N 81°08′06″W

Sign marking the location of Sweden, South Carolina

Sweden is an unincorporated community in Bamberg County, in the U.S. state of South Carolina.

== History ==
Sweden was so named in order to fit with the railroad's "Scandinavian" naming scheme; other such examples include Denmark, South Carolina, Norway, South Carolina, and Finland, South Carolina.
