= McCoy Farmstead (Holly Hill, South Carolina) =

Historic house in South Carolina, United States

- U.S. National Register of Historic Places
- Location within South Carolina Location within the United States
- Location: 307 Boyer Rd., Holly Hill, South Carolina
- Coordinates: 33.318°N 80.4348°W
- Built: c.1875; 151 years ago
- NRHP reference No.: 100003315
- Added to NRHP: January 22, 2019

McCoy Farmstead, located at 307 Boyer Road near Holly Hill, South Carolina, was added to the National Register of Historic Places on January 22, 2019.

The property includes a vernacular Queen Anne house built around 1875, a schoolhouse, agricultural outbuildings, and "Lula's House" (the home of a tenant).

The schoolhouse, also built around 1875, is located across Boyer Road from the rest of the buildings 33.318214°N 80.435466°W. It is a wood frame one-story building.

== See also ==
- National Register of Historic Places listings in Orangeburg County, South Carolina
