= Finland, South Carolina =

Unincorporated community in South Carolina, US

Coordinates: 33°21′58″N 81°05′35″W

Finland is an unincorporated community in Bamberg County, in the U.S. state of South Carolina.

== History ==
Finland was so named in order to fit with the railroad's "Scandinavian" naming scheme; other such examples include Denmark, South Carolina, Norway, South Carolina and Sweden, South Carolina.
