= Eugene Robinson (journalist) =

American journalist

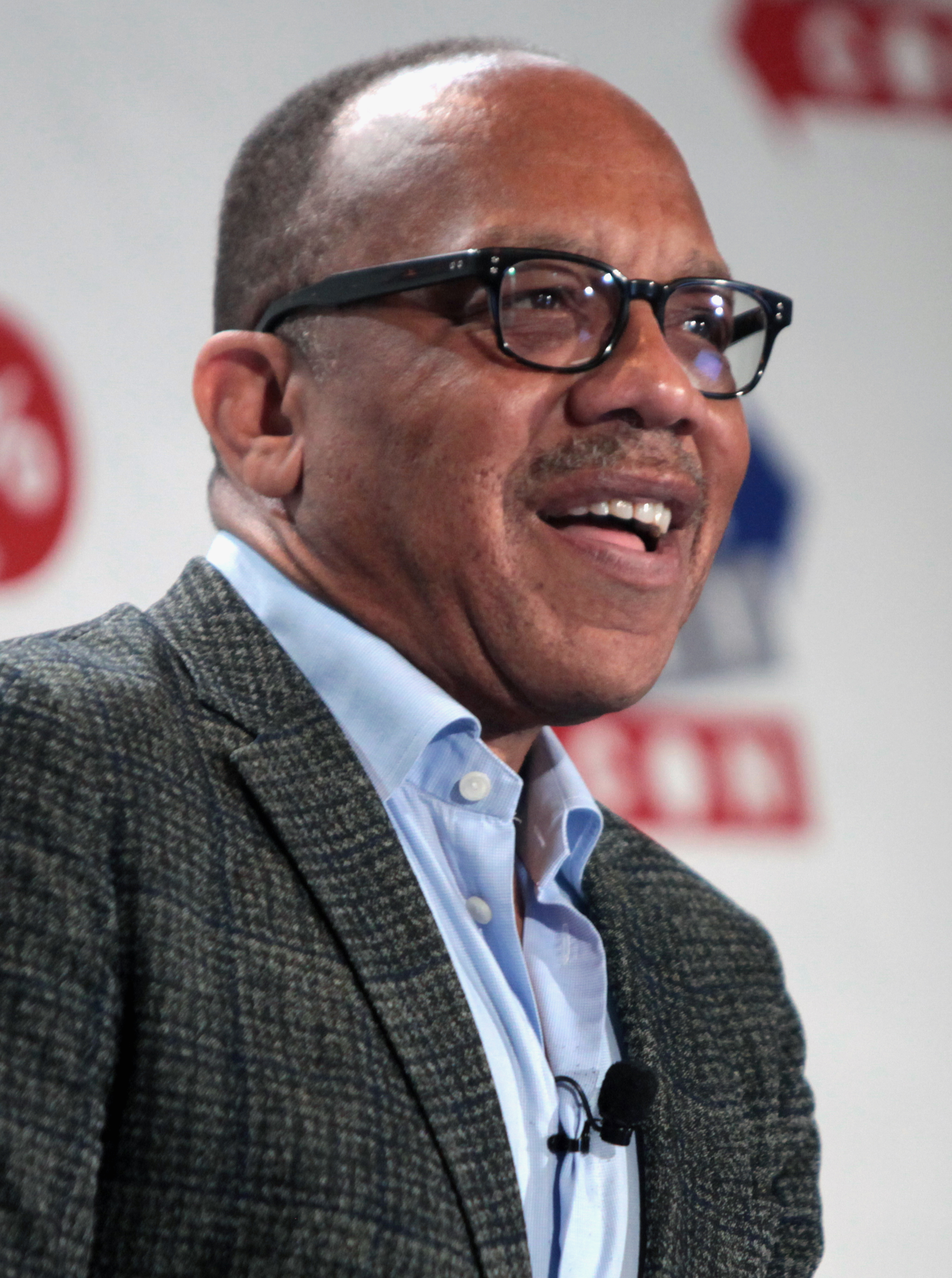
- Robinson in 2016
- Born: Eugene Harold Robinson; March 12, 1954 (age 72); Orangeburg, South Carolina, U.S.
- Education: University of Michigan (BA)
- Occupation: Journalist
- Notable credit(s): The Washington Post; San Francisco Chronicle
- Spouse: Avis

Eugene Harold Robinson (born March 12, 1954) is an American newspaper columnist, former associate editor of The Washington Post, author, and chief political analyst. His columns were syndicated to 262 newspapers by The Washington Post Writers Group. He won a Pulitzer Prize in 2009, was elected to the Pulitzer Prize Board in 2011 and served as its chair from 2017 to 2018. Robinson is chief political analyst at NBC News and MS NOW.

Robinson is a member of the National Association of Black Journalists and a board member of the IWMF (International Women's Media Foundation). His wife Avis died on October 28, 2023, from cancer.

== Biography ==
=== Early years and education ===
Robinson was born in Orangeburg, South Carolina and attended Orangeburg-Wilkinson High School, where he "was one of a handful of black students on a previously all-white campus."

Before graduating from the University of Michigan in 1974, he was the first African American co-editor-in-chief of The Michigan Daily. During the 1987–88 academic year, he was a mid-career Nieman Fellow at Harvard University.

=== Career ===
In 1976, he began his journalism career at the San Francisco Chronicle; his early assignments included the trial of publishing heiress Patty Hearst. He joined The Washington Post in 1980. Working his way up through the ranks, he was first a city hall reporter at the paper. He then became the assistant city editor; a South America correspondent based in Buenos Aires, Argentina; London bureau chief; foreign editor; and, most recently, the assistant managing editor of the paper's Style section. He began writing columns for the opinion page of the paper in 2005, also writes a twice-a-week column on politics and culture, and conducts a weekly online conversation with readers.

Robinson appears frequently as a liberal political analyst on MSNOW cable-TV network's programs such as Morning Joe, PoliticsNation with Al Sharpton, The Rachel Maddow Show, The 11th Hour, and Andrea Mitchell Reports. In addition, he is often a panelist on NBC's public affairs program Meet the Press.

Robinson was awarded the 2009 Pulitzer Prize for Commentary in recognition of his columns that focused on then-Senator Barack Obama in the context of his first presidential campaign.

Robinson is a 2021 honoree of the Larry Foster Award for Integrity in Public Communication, a recognition from The Arthur W. Page Center for Integrity in Public Communication. He is a part of the fifth class of Larry Foster Award honorees, which honors professionals who "exemplify the importance of truthful communication with the public."

In March 2022, Robinson was interviewed for the Frontline documentary Putin's Road to War, where he discussed the Russian invasion of Ukraine.

Robinson resigned from The Washington Post in April 2025.

Robinson's book Freedom Lost, Freedom Won: A Personal History of America --which traces his family's roots back to his great-great-grandfather Henry Fordham, who was able to buy his freedom from slavery in 1851--was published in February 2026. The book also notes that the Orangeburg, SC house Robinson was raised in, built in 1903 by his maternal great-grandfather and known as the Maj. John Hammond Fordham House, was added to the National Register of Historic Places in 1985. Robinson and his sister Ellen still own it.

== Books ==
External videos
- Presentation by Robinson on Coal to Cream, September 7, 1999, C-SPAN
- Booknotes interview with Robinson on Coal to Cream, November 7, 1999, C-SPAN
- Presentation by Robinson on Last Dance in Havana, July 20, 2004, C-SPAN
- Presentation by Robinson on Disintegration, October 16, 2010, C-SPAN
- Presentation by Robinson on Disintegration, September 24, 2011, C-SPAN
- Interview with Robinson on Disintegration, September 24, 2011, C-SPAN

- Coal to Cream: A Black Man's Journey Beyond Color to an Affirmation of Race. New York: Free Press. 1999. ISBN 0-684-85722-7.
- Last Dance in Havana: The Final Days of Fidel and the Start of the New Cuban Revolution. New York: Free Press. 2004. ISBN 0-7432-4622-5.
- Disintegration: The Splintering of Black America. New York: Doubleday. 2010. ISBN 978-0-385-52654-8.

== See also ==
- Maj. John Hammond Fordham House - his boyhood home
