= Dixie Library Building =

- U.S. National Register of Historic Places
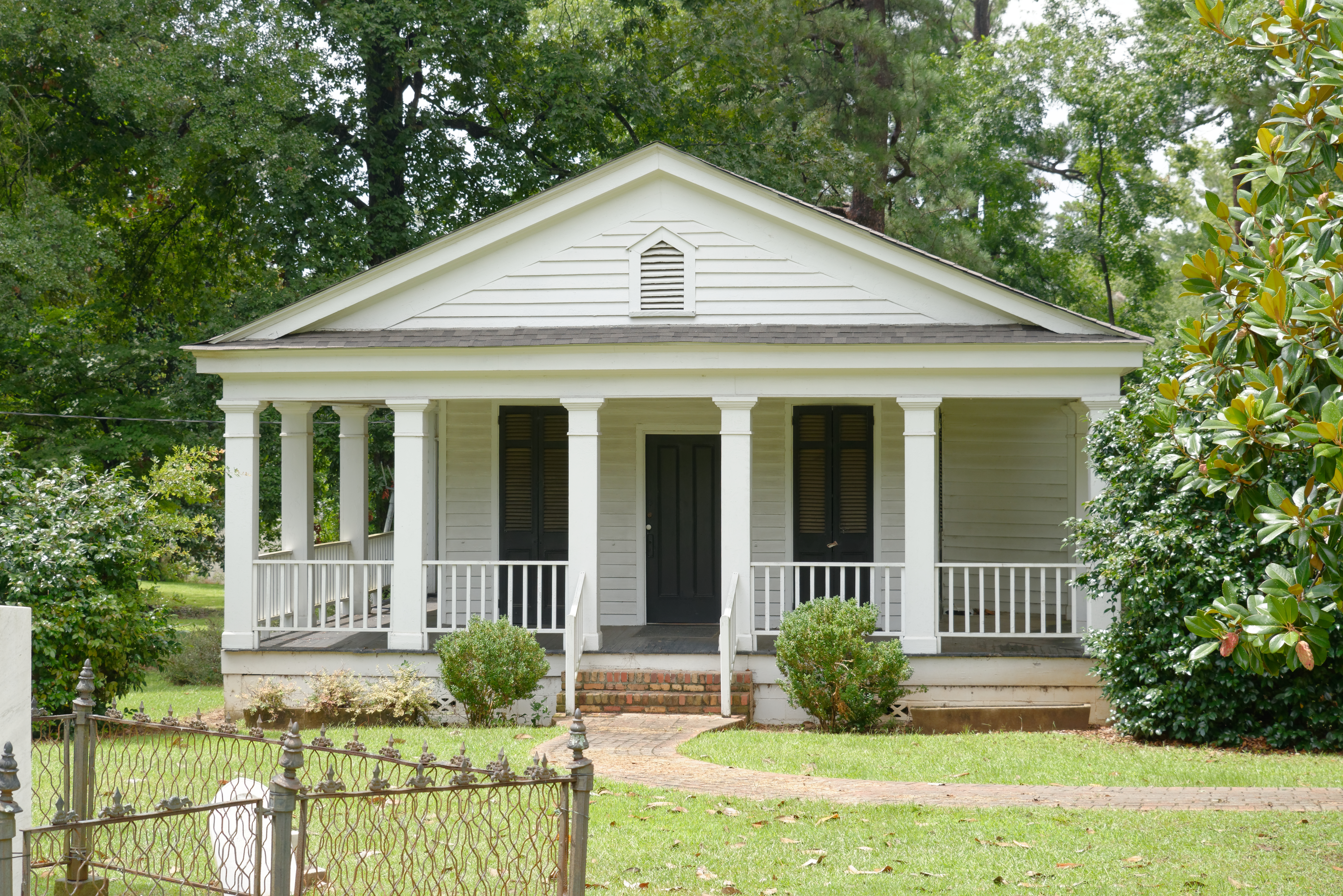

- Location within South Carolina Location within the United States
- Location: Bull St., Orangeburg, South Carolina
- Coordinates: 33.49259°N 80.86806°W
- Area: 1.8 acres (0.73 ha)
- Built: c. 1850
- Architectural style: Classical Revival
- MPS: Orangeburg MRA
- NRHP reference No.: 85002336
- Added to NRHP: September 20, 1985

Dixie Library Building is a historic library building located at Orangeburg in Orangeburg County, South Carolina. It was built about 1850, and is a one-story, frame Classical Revival style building. It has a small rear addition, a pedimented and low-pitched gable roof, and colonnade of Tuscan order piers. The building was moved in 1912 and 1955.

It was added to the National Register of Historic Places in 1985.
