= Willow Consolidated High School =

Historic school in South Carolina, US

- U.S. National Register of Historic Places
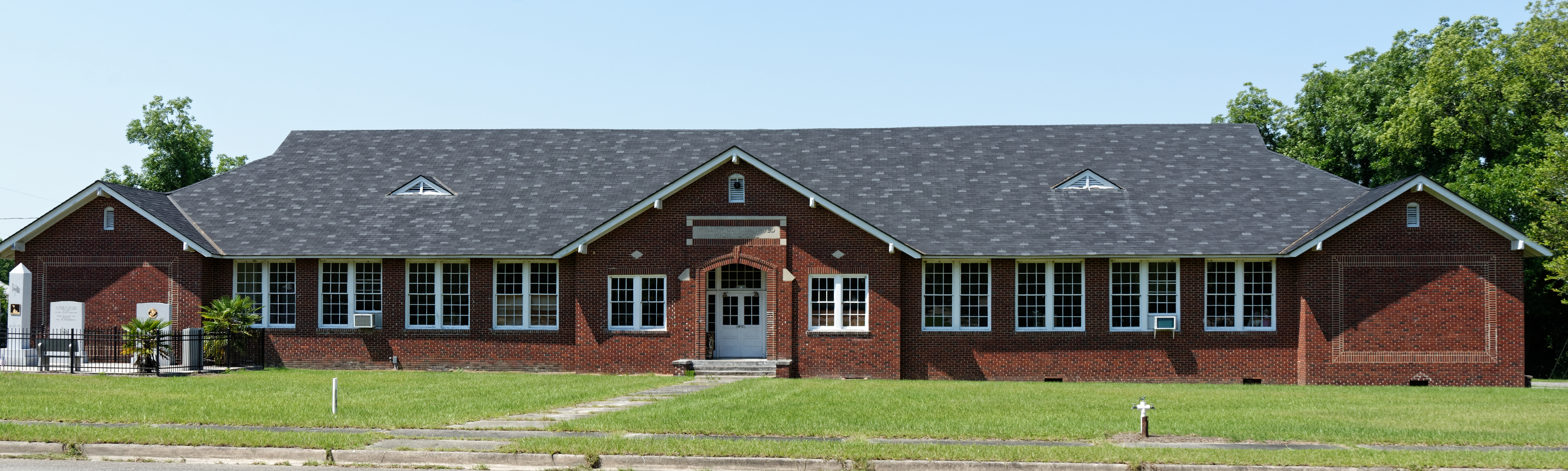

- Location within South Carolina Location within the United States
- Location: 2750 Cope Rd., Norway, South Carolina
- Coordinates: 33.44611°N 81.12300°W
- Area: 3 acres (1.2 ha)
- Built: 1926
- Architectural style: Late 19th And 20th Century Revivals
- NRHP reference No.: 06000581
- Added to NRHP: July 11, 2006

Willow Consolidated High School, also known as Norway Junior High School and Norway Middle School, is a historic high school building located at Norway, Orangeburg County, South Carolina. It was built in 1926, and is a one-story, T-shaped brick veneer building with an auditorium located at the rear. It has a gable-on-hip roof with projecting cross gables at the center and ends of the building's façade. Also on the property is a separate frame agriculture building (1940). The school closed in the late 1980s.

It was added to the National Register of Historic Places in 2006.
