= Trinity Methodist Episcopal Church (Orangeburg, South Carolina) =

Historic church in South Carolina, United States

- U.S. National Register of Historic Places
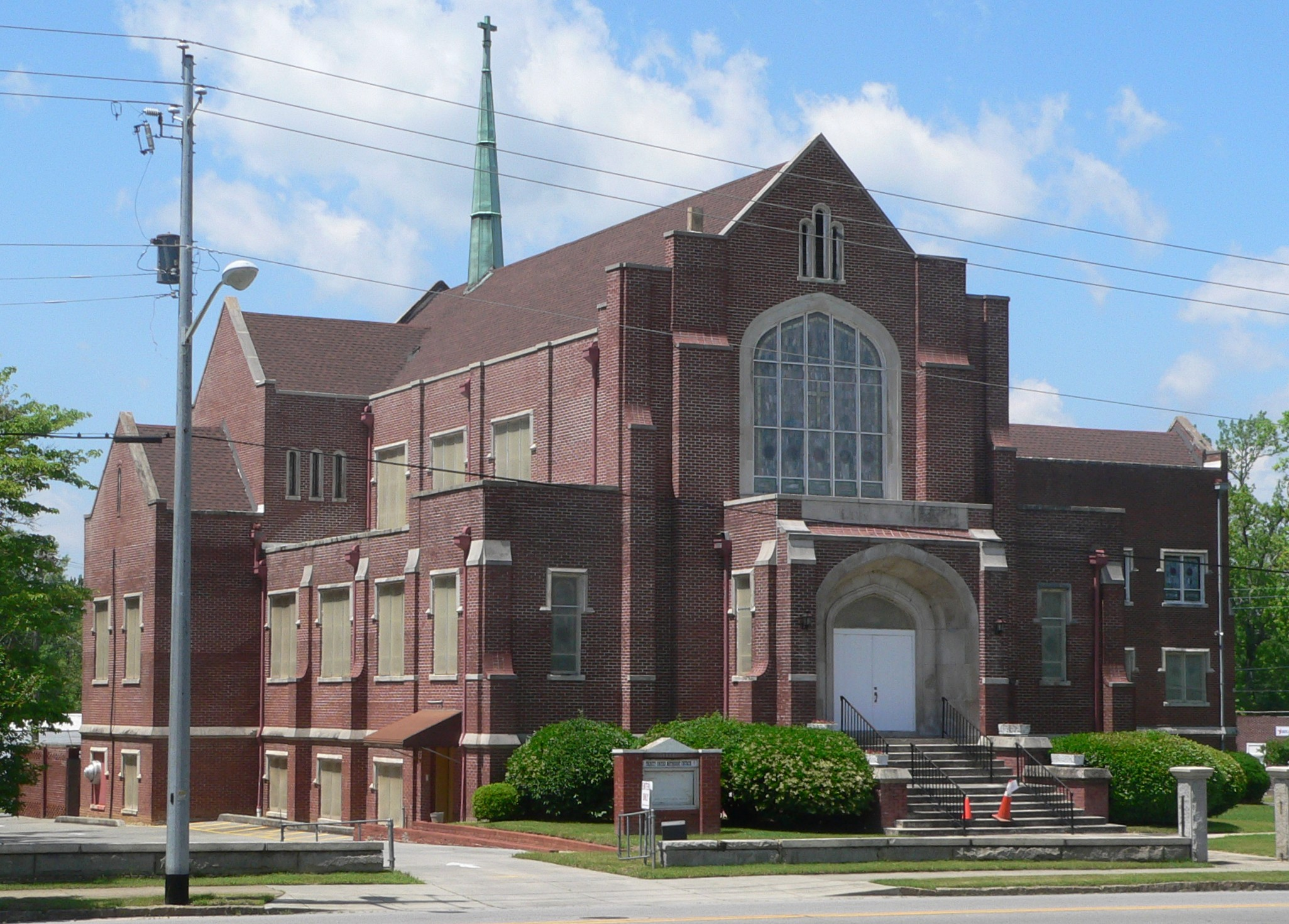

- Location within South Carolina Location within the United States
- Location: 185 Boulevard NE., Orangeburg, South Carolina
- Coordinates: 33.495569°N 80.856505°W
- Built: 1928-1944
- Architect: Wilkins, William W.
- Architectural style: Late Gothic Revival
- MPS: Orangeburg MRA
- NRHP reference No.: 94001053
- Added to NRHP: August 26, 1994

Trinity Methodist Episcopal Church is a historic Methodist Episcopal church located at 185 Boulevard NE in Orangeburg, Orangeburg County, South Carolina. It was built between 1928 and 1944 and is a two-story, brick Late Gothic Revival-style church building on a raised basement. It features a large Tudor arched stained glass window with molded cast stone surround.

It was added to the National Register of Historic Places in 1994.
