= William P. Stroman House =

Historic house in South Carolina, United States

- U.S. National Register of Historic Places
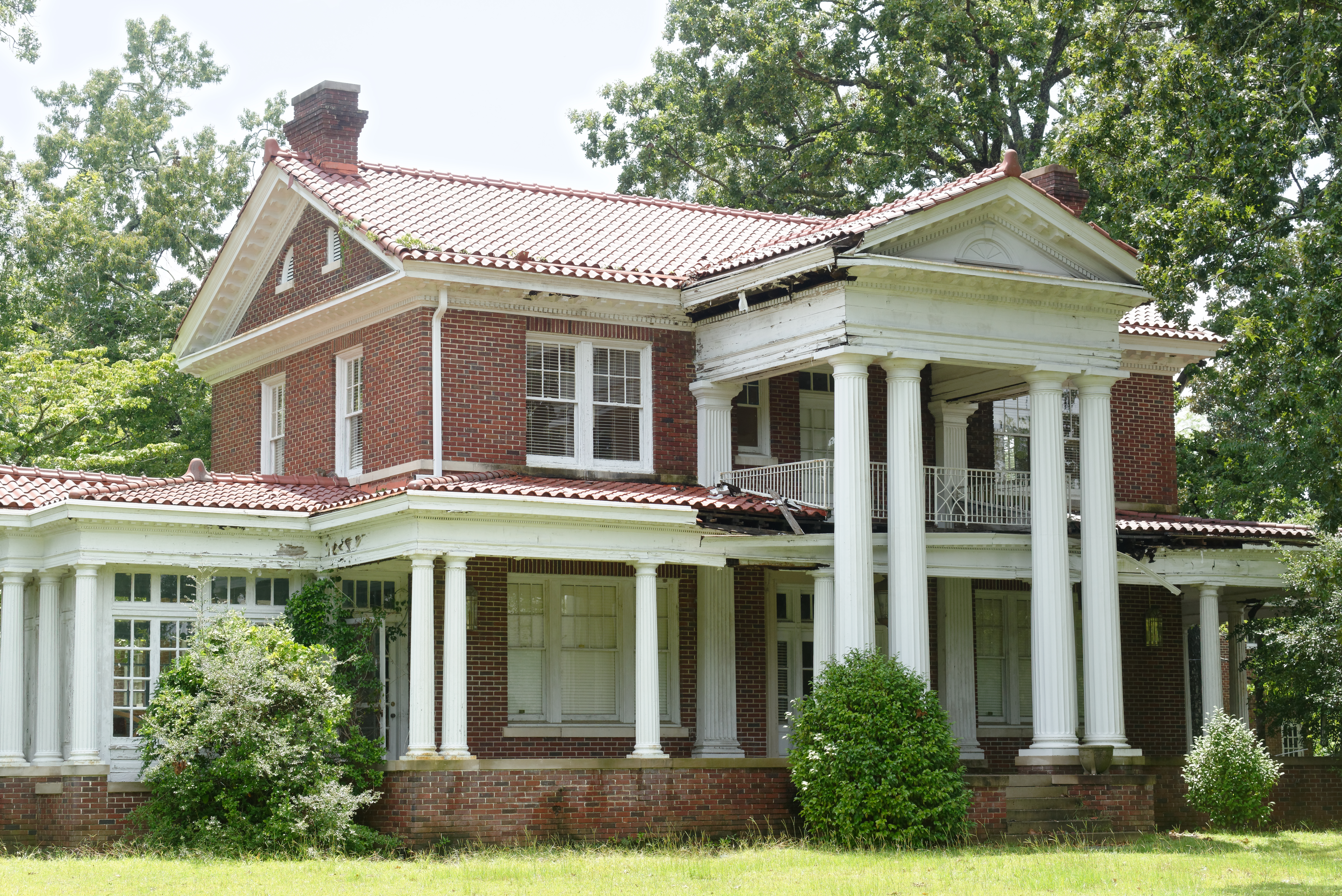

- Location within South Carolina Location within the United States
- Location: 1017 N. Boulevard, Orangeburg, South Carolina
- Coordinates: 33.50360°N 80.85951°W
- Area: 2 acres (0.81 ha)
- Built: 1926
- Architect: Lafaye & Lafaye
- Architectural style: Classical Revival
- MPS: Orangeburg MRA
- NRHP reference No.: 96000836
- Added to NRHP: August 1, 1996

William P. Stroman House is a historic home located at Orangeburg, Orangeburg County, South Carolina. It was built in 1926, and is a two-story, Classical Revival style brick dwelling. It features a full-height porch with Doric order columns and a Spanish tile roof. Also on the property are a contributing garage and greenhouse. It was added to the National Register of Historic Places in 1996.

The house has been scene to tragedy. In 1955, Mr. Stoman and his wife were attacked by an axe-wielding intruder in the house, and his wife was killed. Samuel Wright, Jr., the grandson of the Stoman's maid, was convicted of the murder, and received the death penalty.
