= F.H.W. Briggman House =

Historic house in South Carolina, United States

- F. H. W. Briggman House
- U.S. National Register of Historic Places
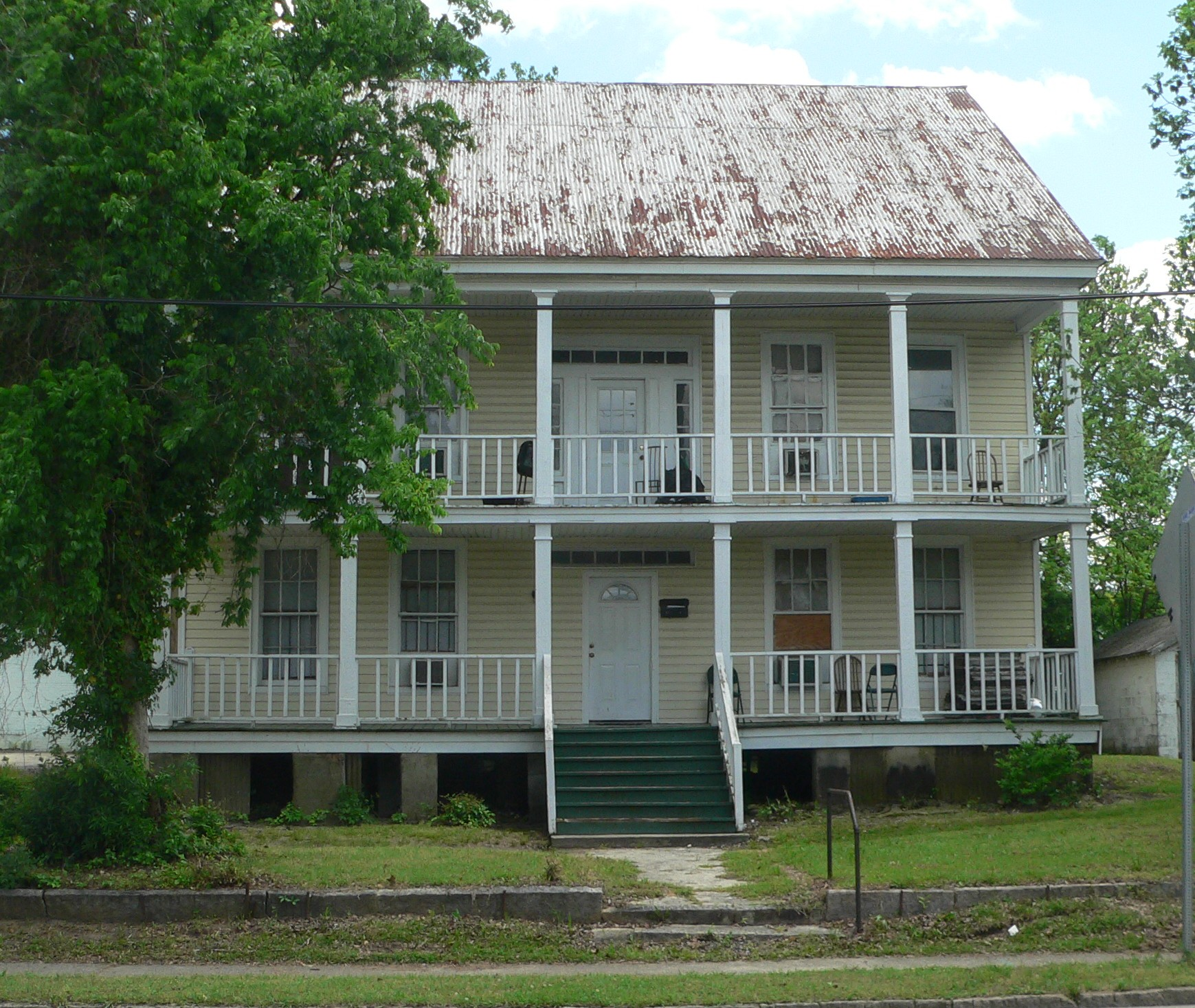

- Location within South Carolina Location within the United States
- Location: 156 Amelia Street, Orangeburg, South Carolina
- Coordinates: 33.490261°N 80.865601°W
- Area: 0.2 acres (0.081 ha)
- Built: c. 1855
- Architectural style: Greek Revival
- MPS: Orangeburg MRA
- NRHP reference No.: 85002337
- Added to NRHP: September 20, 1985

F. H. W. Briggman House is a historic house located at 156 Amelia Street in Orangeburg, Orangeburg County, South Carolina. The house originally served as the home of Frederick Briggman, the first mayor of Orangeburg.

== Description and history ==
It was built about 1855, and is a 2 1/2-story, rectangular, frame vernacular Greek Revival dwelling. It has a gable roof, three exterior stuccoed brick end chimneys, and a rear addition. The front facade features a two-tiered recessed porch.

It was added to the National Register of Historic Places on September 20, 1985.
