= Hotel Eutaw =

- U.S. National Register of Historic Places
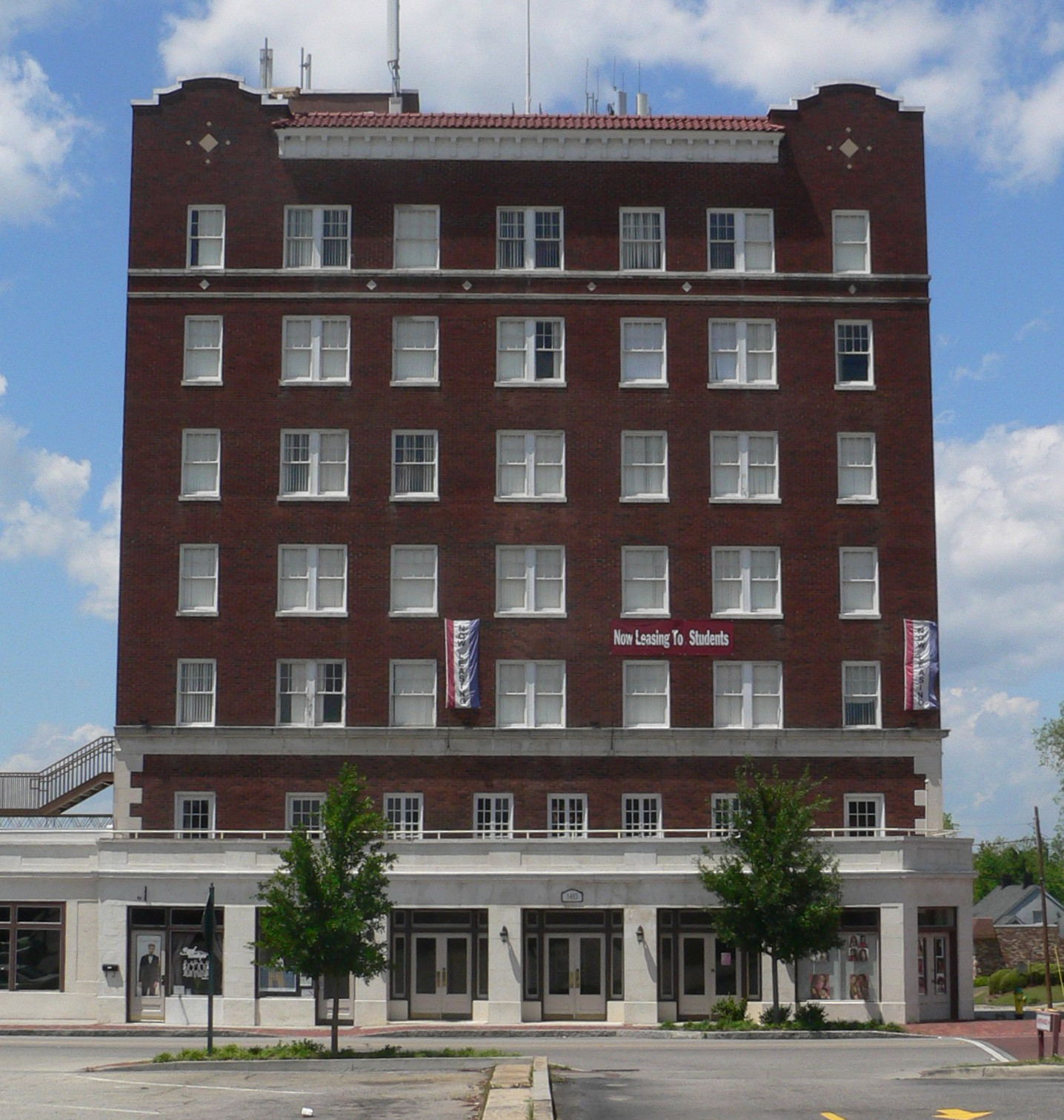

- Location within South Carolina Location within the United States
- Location: Russell & Centre Sts., Orangeburg, South Carolina
- Coordinates: 33.491481°N 80.860511°W
- Built: 1925-1927
- Built by: Stout, Joe W.,& Co.
- Architect: Preacher, G. Lloyd
- Architectural style: L-shape
- MPS: Orangeburg MRA
- NRHP reference No.: 85002318
- Added to NRHP: September 20, 1985

Hotel Eutaw, also known as the East Russell Street Inn, is a historic hotel located at Orangeburg, Orangeburg County, South Carolina. It was designed by architect G. Lloyd Preacher and built in 1926–1927. It is a seven-story, steel-frame with brick veneer, skyscraper with an L-shaped plan. The front façade features a projecting one-story, six-bay, cast stone entrance block.

It was added to the National Register of Historic Places in 1985.
