= Alan Mack Site (38OR67) =

Archaeological site in South Carolina, United States

- U.S. National Register of Historic Places
- Nearest city: Orangeburg, South Carolina
- Area: 0.7 acres (0.28 ha)
- NRHP reference No.: 86000044
- Added to NRHP: January 6, 1986

Alan Mack Site (38OR67) is a historic archaeological site located near Orangeburg, Orangeburg County, South Carolina. The site includes archaeological evidence of occupation during the Early, Middle, and Late Archaic; Early, Middle, and Late Woodland; and Mississippian periods.

It was added to the National Register of Historic Places in 1986.
