= East Russell Street Area Historic District =

Historic district in South Carolina, United States

- U.S. National Register of Historic Places
- U.S. Historic district
- Location within South Carolina Location within the United States
- Location: Along sections of E. Russell St. between Watson & Clarendon Sts. and along portion of Oakland Pl. Dickson & Whitman Sts., Orangeburg, South Carolina
- Coordinates: 33°29′36″N 80°51′04″W
- Area: 33 acres (13 ha)
- Architect: Whittaker, Miller F.; Multiple
- Architectural style: L plan
- MPS: Orangeburg MRA
- NRHP reference No.: 85002335
- Added to NRHP: September 20, 1985

East Russell Street Area Historic District is a national historic district located at Orangeburg, Orangeburg County, South Carolina. The district encompasses 55 contributing buildings in a residential section of Orangeburg. They include residences constructed between about 1850 and 1930, and includes large, one- and two-story, frame and brick houses and smaller one-story homes occupied by servants. The houses are in a variety of popular architectural styles including Victorian, Colonial Revival, and Bungalow.

It was added to the National Register of Historic Places in 1985.
