= White House United Methodist Church =

Historic church in South Carolina, United States

- White House Global Methodist Church
- U.S. National Register of Historic Places
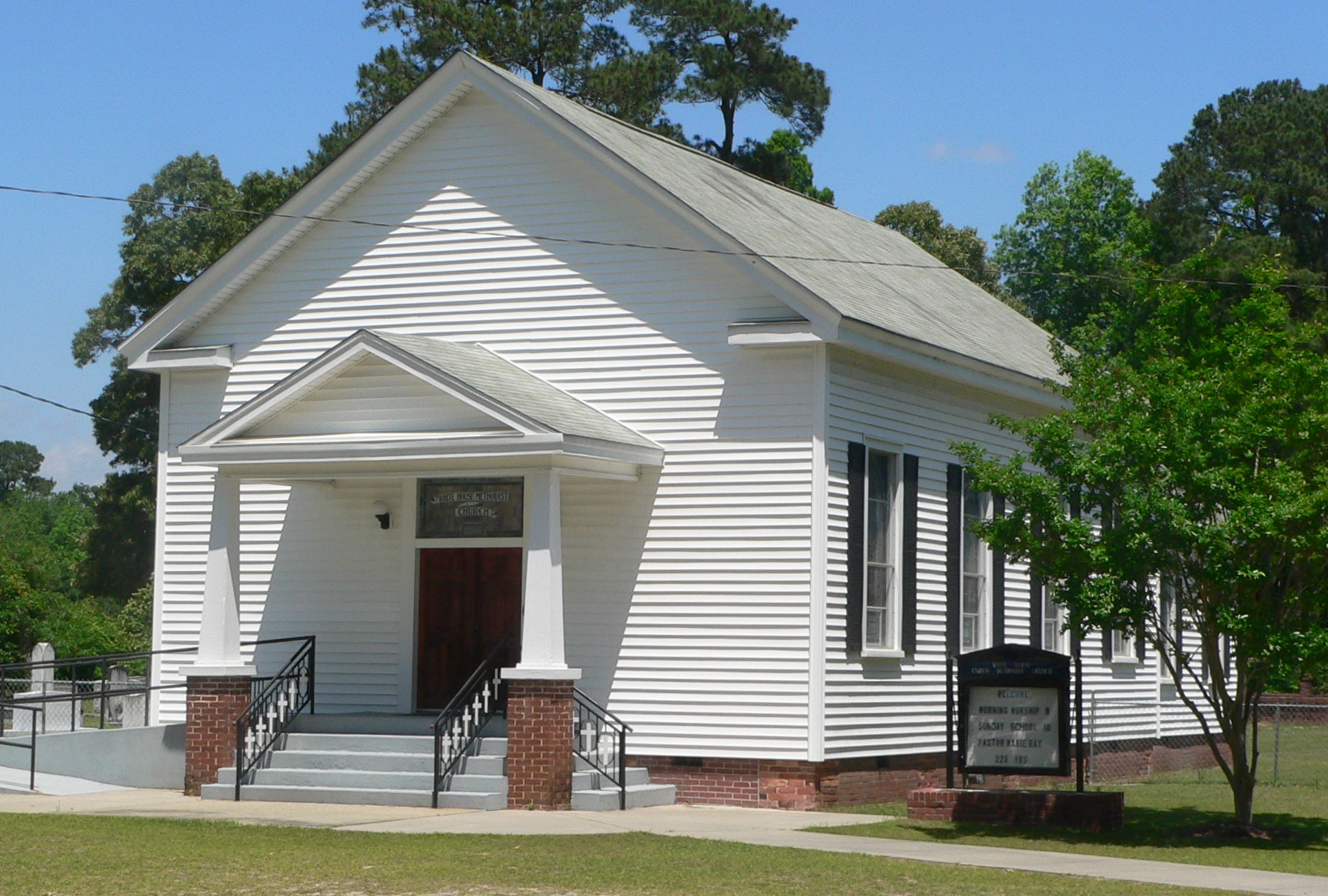

- Location within South Carolina Location within the United States
- Location: North of Orangeburg on U.S. Route 301, near Orangeburg, South Carolina
- Coordinates: 33.459763°N 80.718082°W
- Area: 4 acres (1.6 ha)
- Built: 1850
- Architectural style: Meeting House Style
- NRHP reference No.: 74001872
- Added to NRHP: May 13, 1974

White House Global Methodist Church, also known as the White Meeting House and White Church, is a historic Global Methodist Church located near Bowman, South Carolina. It was built about 1850, and is a one-story, rectangular frame meeting house style building. It forms one-of three campuses of the Bowman Charge Global Methodist Church in the area, with Ebenezer and Wightman Global Methodist Churches being the other two members. White House Global Methodist houses the oldest Methodist congregation in Orangeburg County, dating back to the late 1780s. Francis Asbury visited the congregation in 1801 and 1803.

It was added to the National Register of Historic Places in 1974.

On June 11, 2024, the Bowman Charge announced on Facebook its formal departure from the United Methodist Church; as of July 1, 2024, it joined the Global Methodist Church.
