= Tingley Memorial Hall, Claflin College =

- U.S. National Register of Historic Places
- U.S. Historic district – Contributing property
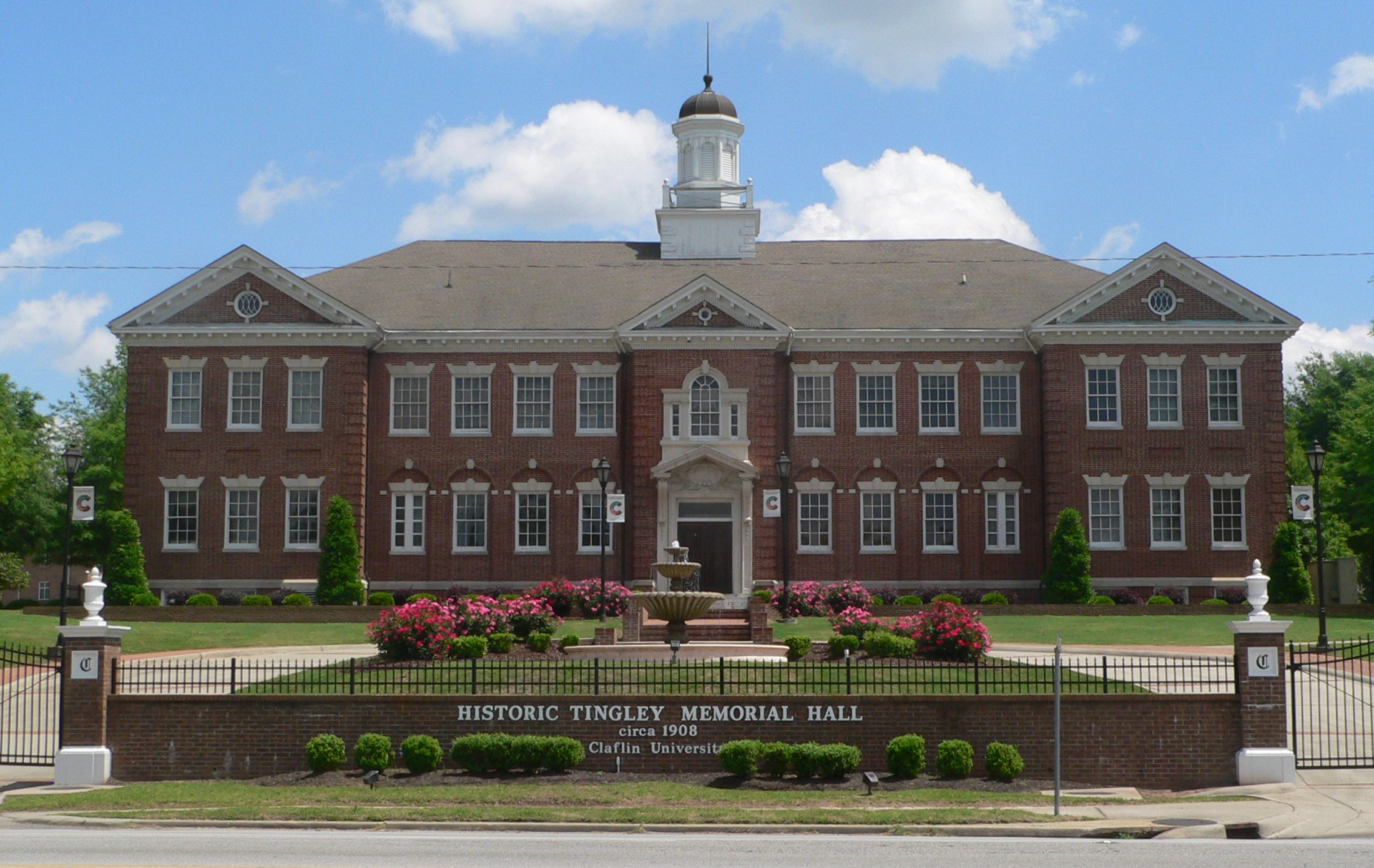

- Location within South Carolina Location within the United States
- Location: College Ave., Orangeburg, South Carolina
- Coordinates: 33.498414°N 80.854333°W
- Built: 1908
- Architect: William Wilson Cooke
- MPS: Orangeburg MRA
- NRHP reference No.: 83002205
- Added to NRHP: August 4, 1983

Tingley Memorial Hall is a historic academic building located on the campus of Claflin University at Orangeburg, Orangeburg County, South Carolina. It was built in 1908, and is a two-story, brick Classical Revival style building. The buildings serves as the main building on the Claflin College campus. The hipped and gable roof is topped by an octagonal cupola.

It was added to the National Register of Historic Places in 1983. It is located in the Claflin College Historic District.
