= Mt. Pisgah Baptist Church =

Historic church in South Carolina, United States

- U.S. National Register of Historic Places
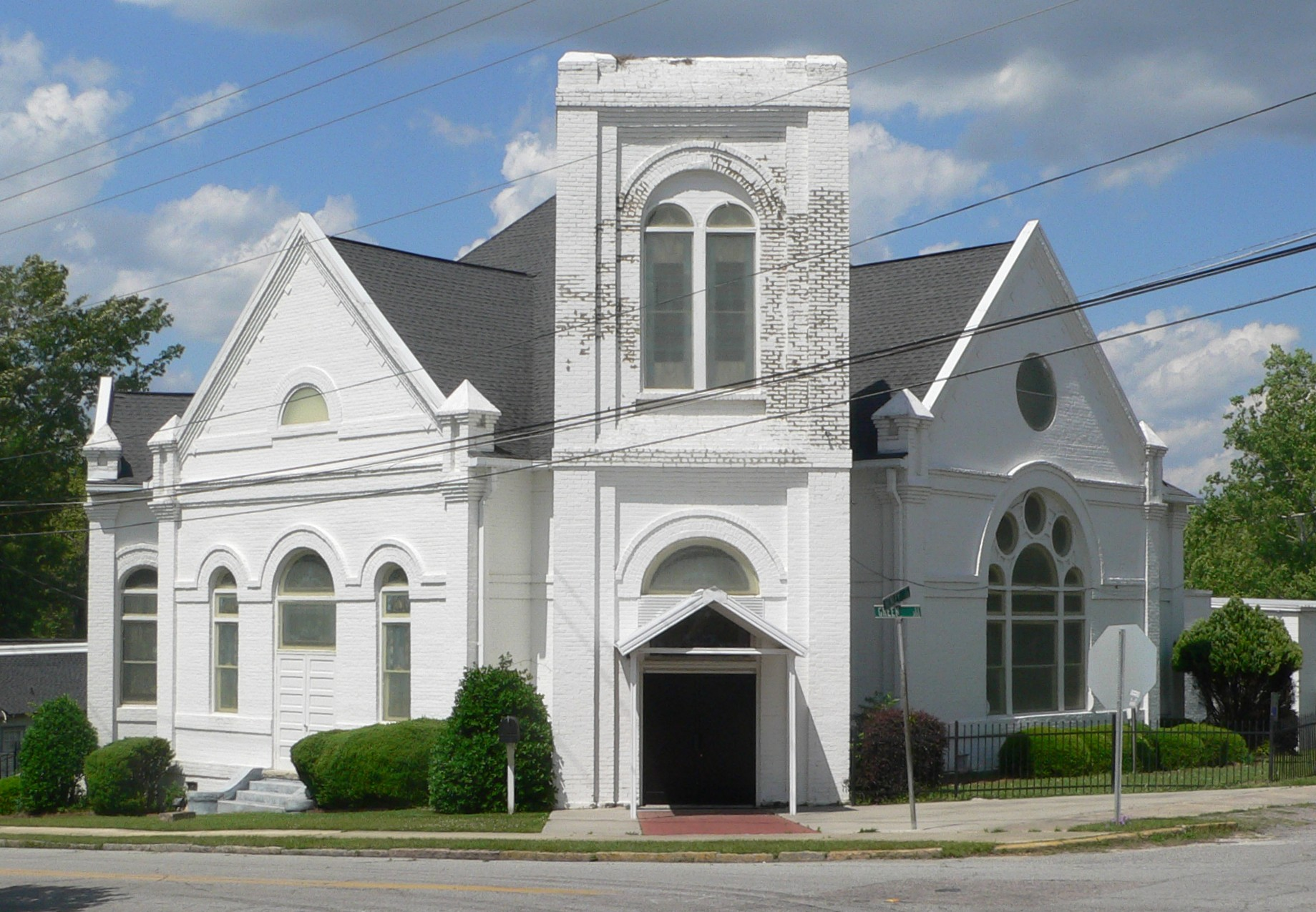

- Location within South Carolina Location within the United States
- Location: 310 Green, Orangeburg, South Carolina
- Coordinates: 33.492891°N 80.865154°W
- Built: 1903
- Architect: Thorne, A.W.
- Architectural style: Square plan
- MPS: Orangeburg MRA
- NRHP reference No.: 85002342
- Added to NRHP: September 20, 1985

Mt. Pisgah Baptist Church is a historic Baptist church building at 310 Green in Orangeburg in Orangeburg County, South Carolina. It was built in 1903, and is a one-story, brick Romanesque Revival-style church building. It features a prominent corner tower.

It was added to the National Register of Historic Places in 1985.
