= Orangeburg, South Carolina =

- City
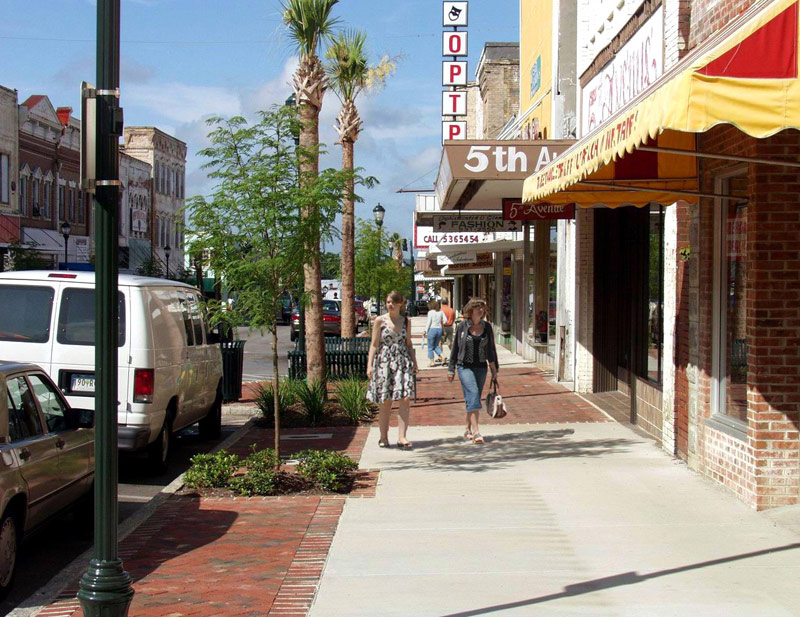
- Central Business District of Orangeburg

- Seal
- Nickname: The Burg /Wreck City
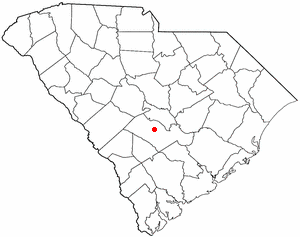
- Location in Orangeburg County, South Carolina
- Coordinates: 33°30′12″N 80°52′20″W
- Country: United States
- State: South Carolina
- County: Orangeburg
- Named for: William IV, Prince of Orange

Government
  - Type: Mayor–council
  - Body: Charleston City Council
  - Mayor: Michael C. Butler (D)

Area
  - Total: 9.02 sq mi (23.36 km^{2})
  - Land: 9.01 sq mi (23.34 km^{2})
  - Water: 0.0077 sq mi (0.02 km^{2})
- Elevation: 197 ft (60 m)

Population (2020)
  - Total: 13,240
  - Density: 1,469.1/sq mi (567.23/km^{2})
- Time zone: UTC−5 (EST)
  - Summer (DST): UTC−4 (EDT)
- ZIP codes: 29115-29118
- Area codes: 803, 839
- FIPS code: 45-53080
- GNIS feature ID: 2404441
- Website: www.orangeburg.sc.us

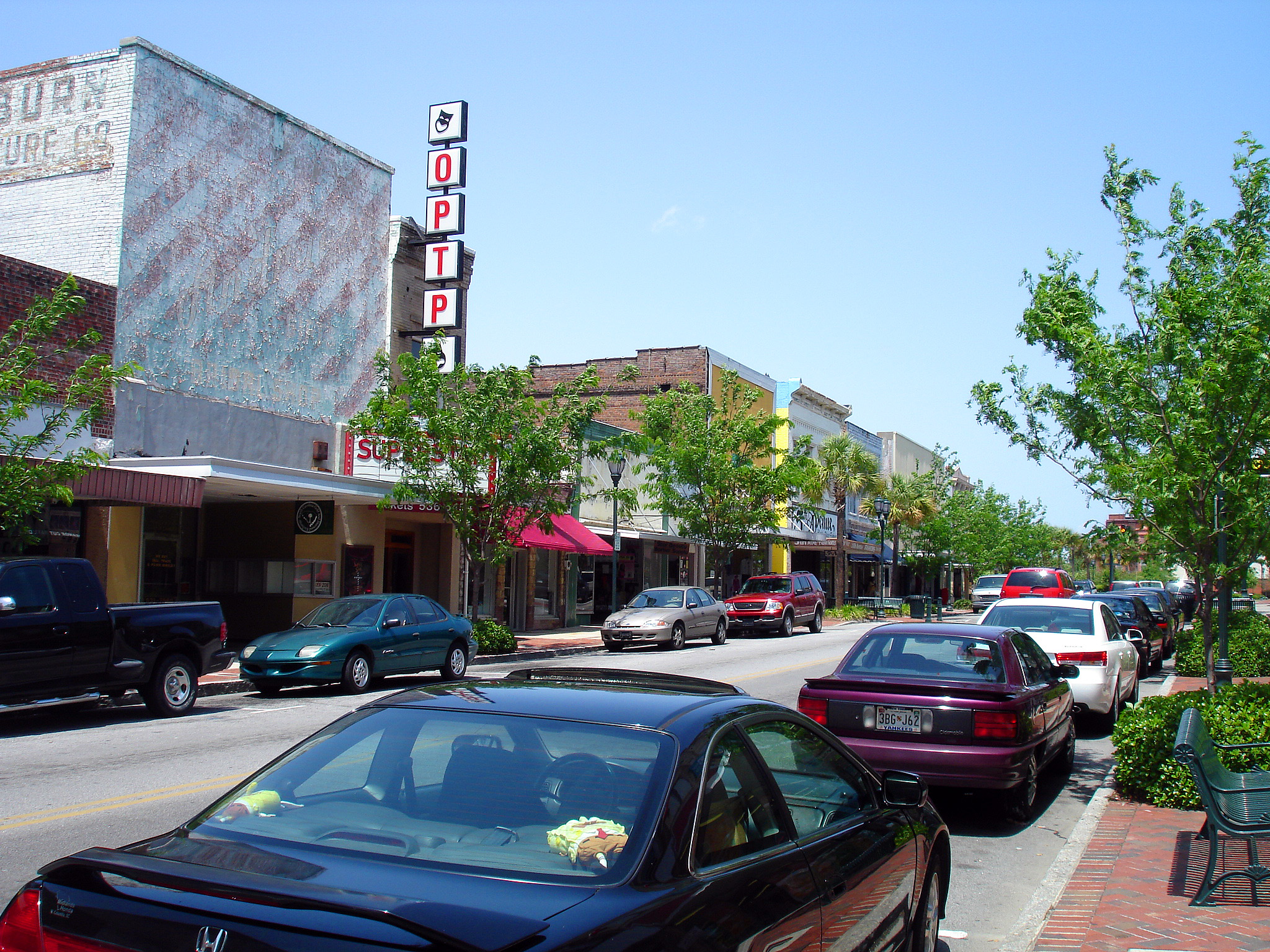
Russell Street, downtown's main street

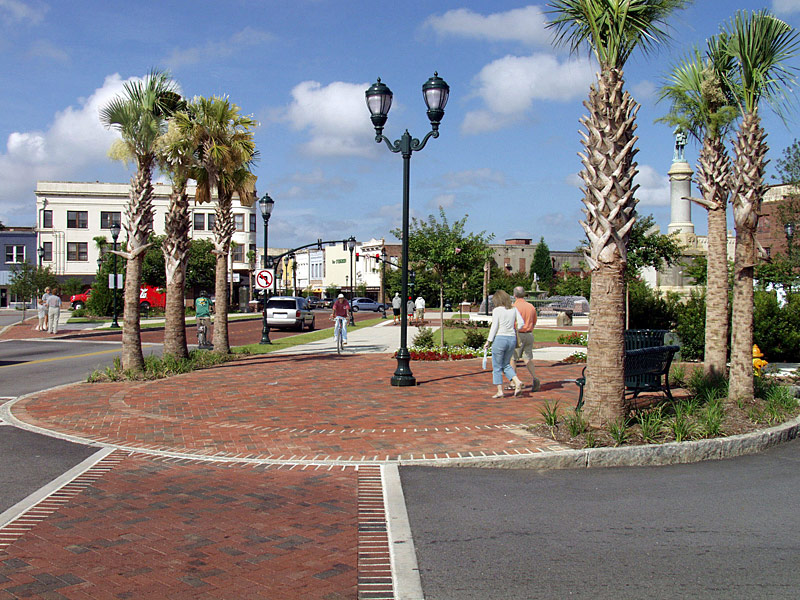
Downtown Loop

Orangeburg is the principal city in and the county seat of Orangeburg County, South Carolina, United States. The population of the city was 13,964 according to the 2020 census. The city is located 37 miles southeast of Columbia, on the north fork of the Edisto River.

Two historically black institutions of higher education are located in Orangeburg: Claflin University (a liberal arts college) and South Carolina State University (a public university).

== History ==
=== 18th century ===
European settlement in this area started in 1704 when George Sterling set up a post here for fur trade with Native Americans. To encourage settlement, the General Assembly of the Province of South Carolina in 1730 organized the area as a township, naming it Orangeburg for William IV, Prince of Orange, the son-in-law of King George II of Great Britain. In 1735, a colony of 200 Swiss, German and Dutch immigrants formed a community near the banks of the North Edisto River. The site was attractive because of the fertile soil and the abundance of wildlife. The river provided the all-important transportation waterway to the port of Charleston on the Atlantic coast for the area's agriculture and lumber products, and for shipping goods upriver. The town soon became a well-established and successful colony, composed chiefly of small yeomen farmers.

Orangeburg's first church was established by a German Lutheran congregation. It later identified as an Anglican Church, which was the established church and exempt from colonial taxation. The church building was erected prior to 1763 in the center of the village; it was destroyed by fighting during the Revolutionary War. A new church was built; during the Civil War, it was used as a smallpox hospital by General William Tecumseh Sherman on his march through with Union forces.

=== 19th century ===
After the American Revolution, the character of the county changed dramatically. Invention by Eli Whitney of a mass-produced cotton gin for processing short-staple or "green seed" cotton made this type of cotton profitable. It was easily grown in the upland areas, and the county was rapidly developed into large cotton plantations. Agricultural labor was provided by enslaved African Americans, many brought into the area in a forced migration from the coastal areas or the Upper South via the domestic slave trade. Slaves became the majority of population in the county and city.

Freed after the Civil War, blacks began to gain educations, and two colleges were established in the city, the second designated as a land grant institution for all black students in the state under segregation. Blacks were also subject to Jim Crow laws passed by the Democrat-dominated state legislature; they were deprived of their ability to vote by South Carolina's disenfranchising constitution passed at the turn of the 20th century, which erected barriers to voter registration.

In 1919, the Orangeburg Regional Medical Center opened.

=== 20th century ===
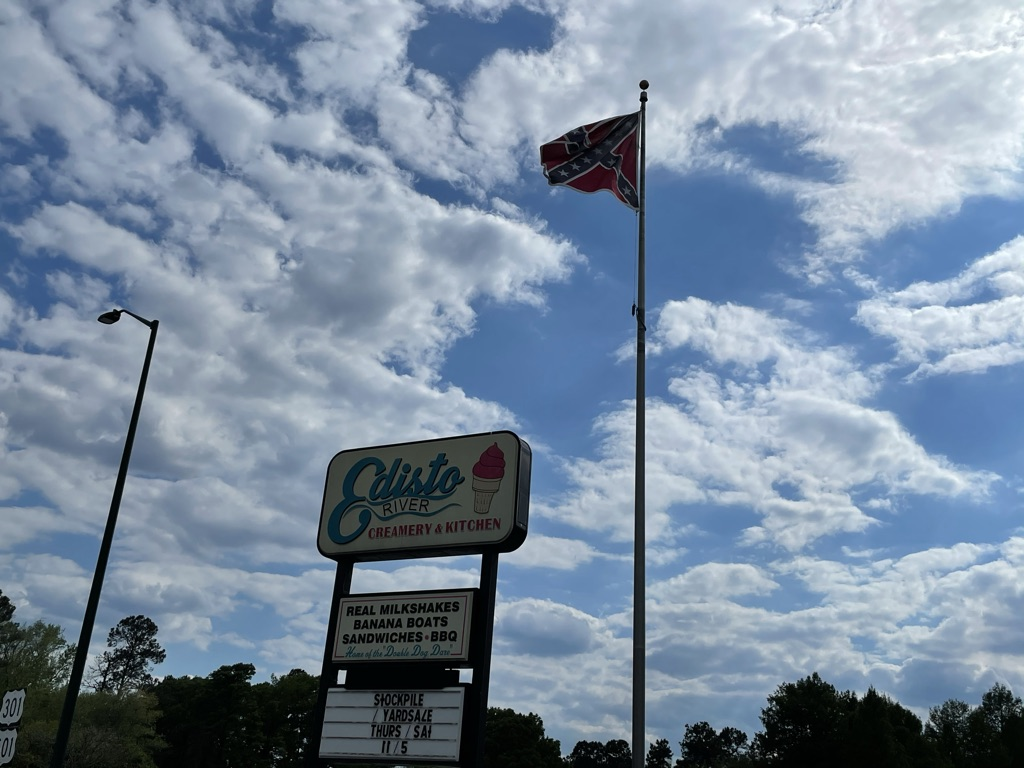
A controversial Confederate flag in Orangeburg owned by the Sons of Confederate Veterans

Efforts by blacks to regain civil rights increased in the postwar period after World War II. In the 1960s, Orangeburg was a major center of Civil Rights Movement activities by students from both Claflin College and South Carolina State College as well as black residents of the city. After the US Supreme Court ruling in Brown v. Board of Education (1954) declaring segregation in public schools to be unconstitutional, local blacks sought integration of local schools in 1956. Whites retaliated economically, sometimes firing activists or evicting them from rental housing. College students came to their support with hunger strikes, boycotts, and mass marches. In 1960, over 400 students were arrested on sit-ins and integration marches organized by the Congress of Racial Equality (CORE).

In August 1963, the Orangeburg Freedom Movement (OFM), chaired by Harlowe Caldwell of the NAACP, submitted 10 pro-integration demands to the Orangeburg Mayor and City Council. After negotiations failed, mass demonstrations similar to those in the Birmingham campaign in Alabama resulted in more than 1,300 arrests. Local efforts to end segregation in public places continued, particularly after Congress passed the Civil Rights Act of 1964.

On February 8, 1968, after days of protests against a de facto segregated bowling alley, violence broke out near the bowling alley as police attacked Black students from South Carolina State. Police opened fire on a crowd of students, killing Samuel Hammond, Henry Smith, and Delano Middleton, and wounding 27 others in what became known as the "Orangeburg Massacre".

=== 21st century ===
In May 2000, the city created the Orangeburg County Community of Character initiative. It is a collaborative effort in community development by the Downtown Orangeburg Revitalization Association (DORA), The Times and Democrat newspaper, the Orangeburg County Chamber of Commerce, and the Orangeburg County Development Commission. In 2005, the National Civic League awarded Orangeburg County the All-America City Award which recognizes and encourages civic excellence. It honors communities in which citizens, government, businesses, and non-profit organizations demonstrate successful resolution of critical community issues.

In 2007, Orangeburg hosted the first Democratic U.S. presidential candidate debate of the campaign season at Martin Luther King Jr. Auditorium on the campus of South Carolina State University; future president Barack Obama was one of the debaters. In 2021, President Joe Biden visited Orangeburg to deliver a commencement address at South Carolina State.

== Geography ==
According to the United States Census Bureau, the city has a total area of 8.3 square miles (21.5 km^{2}), of which 8.3 square miles (21.5 km^{2}) is land and 0.12% is water.

=== Climate ===
The climate in this area is characterized by relatively high temperatures and evenly distributed precipitation throughout the year. According to the Köppen Climate Classification system, Orangeburg has a humid subtropical climate, abbreviated Cfa on climate maps.

Climate data for Orangeburg, South Carolina (1991–2020 normals, extremes 1916–present)
Month	Jan	Feb	Mar	Apr	May	Jun	Jul	Aug	Sep	Oct	Nov	Dec	Year
Record high °F (°C)	84 (29)	86 (30)	93 (34)	97 (36)	102 (39)	105 (41)	107 (42)	108 (42)	106 (41)	99 (37)	91 (33)	90 (32)	108 (42)
Mean maximum °F (°C)	75.4 (24.1)	78.9 (26.1)	85.0 (29.4)	89.1 (31.7)	94.0 (34.4)	97.7 (36.5)	99.0 (37.2)	98.8 (37.1)	95.6 (35.3)	89.5 (31.9)	82.8 (28.2)	76.8 (24.9)	100.1 (37.8)
Mean daily maximum °F (°C)	59.6 (15.3)	63.2 (17.3)	70.2 (21.2)	77.8 (25.4)	84.8 (29.3)	90.4 (32.4)	92.9 (33.8)	91.7 (33.2)	86.9 (30.5)	78.6 (25.9)	69.0 (20.6)	61.7 (16.5)	77.2 (25.1)
Daily mean °F (°C)	48.1 (8.9)	51.4 (10.8)	57.9 (14.4)	65.1 (18.4)	72.7 (22.6)	79.3 (26.3)	82.2 (27.9)	81.4 (27.4)	76.2 (24.6)	66.4 (19.1)	56.3 (13.5)	50.0 (10.0)	65.6 (18.7)
Mean daily minimum °F (°C)	36.6 (2.6)	39.6 (4.2)	45.6 (7.6)	52.4 (11.3)	60.5 (15.8)	68.2 (20.1)	71.5 (21.9)	71.2 (21.8)	65.6 (18.7)	54.1 (12.3)	43.6 (6.4)	38.4 (3.6)	53.9 (12.2)
Mean minimum °F (°C)	20.2 (−6.6)	24.1 (−4.4)	28.9 (−1.7)	36.6 (2.6)	46.6 (8.1)	57.9 (14.4)	63.7 (17.6)	61.4 (16.3)	51.9 (11.1)	37.2 (2.9)	27.9 (−2.3)	23.5 (−4.7)	18.2 (−7.7)
Record low °F (°C)	2 (−17)	9 (−13)	6 (−14)	27 (−3)	35 (2)	47 (8)	54 (12)	53 (12)	40 (4)	27 (−3)	14 (−10)	6 (−14)	2 (−17)
Average precipitation inches (mm)	3.96 (101)	3.86 (98)	3.89 (99)	3.29 (84)	4.04 (103)	5.47 (139)	5.80 (147)	5.29 (134)	4.49 (114)	3.52 (89)	3.09 (78)	3.78 (96)	50.48 (1,282)
Average snowfall inches (cm)	0.1 (0.25)	0.0 (0.0)	0.0 (0.0)	0.0 (0.0)	0.0 (0.0)	0.0 (0.0)	0.0 (0.0)	0.0 (0.0)	0.0 (0.0)	0.0 (0.0)	0.0 (0.0)	0.0 (0.0)	0.1 (0.25)
Average precipitation days (≥ 0.01 in)	10.2	9.6	9.4	8.2	8.9	11.0	11.0	11.1	8.5	7.6	7.5	10.0	113.0
Source: NOAA

== Demographics ==
Historical population
Census	Pop.	Note	%±
1860	997		—
1870	246		−75.3%
1880	2,140		769.9%
1890	2,964		38.5%
1900	4,455		50.3%
1910	5,906		32.6%
1920	7,290		23.4%
1930	8,776		20.4%
1940	10,521		19.9%
1950	15,322		45.6%
1960	13,852		−9.6%
1970	13,252		−4.3%
1980	14,933		12.7%
1990	13,739		−8.0%
2000	12,765		−7.1%
2010	13,964		9.4%
2020	13,240		−5.2%
U.S. Decennial Census

=== Racial and ethnic composition ===
Orangeburg, South Carolina – racial and ethnic composition Note: the US Census treats Hispanic/Latino as an ethnic category. This table excludes Latinos from the racial categories and assigns them to a separate category. Hispanics/Latinos may be of any race.
Race / ethnicity (NH = Non-Hispanic)	Pop 2000	Pop 2010	Pop 2020	% 2000	% 2010	2020
White alone (NH)	3,758	2,891	2,237	29.44%	20.70%	16.90%
Black or African American alone (NH)	8,577	10,411	10,119	67.19%	74.56%	76.43%
Native American or Alaska Native alone (NH)	17	24	48	0.13%	0.17%	0.36%
Asian alone (NH)	145	231	277	1.14%	1.65%	2.09%
Native Hawaiian or Pacific Islander alone (NH)	5	7	14	0.04%	0.05%	0.11%
Other race alone (NH)	30	12	36	0.24%	0.09%	0.27%
Mixed-race or multiracial (NH)	68	122	249	0.53%	0.87%	1.88%
Hispanic or Latino (any race)	165	266	260	1.29%	1.90%	1.96%
Total	12,765	13,964	13,240	100.00%	100.00%	100.00%

=== 2020 census ===
As of the 2020 census, there were 13,240 people, 4,628 households, and 2,283 families residing in the city. The median age was 31.5 years. 19.0% of residents were under the age of 18 and 17.4% of residents were 65 years of age or older. For every 100 females there were 81.9 males, and for every 100 females age 18 and over there were 77.1 males age 18 and over.

99.8% of residents lived in urban areas, while 0.2% lived in rural areas.

There were 4,628 households in Orangeburg, of which 28.9% had children under the age of 18 living in them. Of all households, 24.5% were married-couple households, 22.3% were households with a male householder and no spouse or partner present, and 48.0% were households with a female householder and no spouse or partner present. About 38.8% of all households were made up of individuals and 16.7% had someone living alone who was 65 years of age or older.

There were 5,621 housing units, of which 17.7% were vacant. The homeowner vacancy rate was 3.2% and the rental vacancy rate was 10.1%.

Racial composition as of the 2020 census
Race	Number	Percent
White	2,268	17.1%
Black or African American	10,186	76.9%
American Indian and Alaska Native	52	0.4%
Asian	279	2.1%
Native Hawaiian and Other Pacific Islander	15	0.1%
Some other race	140	1.1%
Two or more races	300	2.3%

=== 2010 census ===
As of the census of 2010, there were 13,964 people, 4,512 households, and 2,526 families residing in the city. The population density was 1648.8 There were 5,168 housing units at an average density of 623.1 per square mile (240.6/km^{2}). The racial makeup of the city was 75.04% African American, 19.2% White, 0.18% Native American, 1.74% Asian, 0.05% Pacific Islander, 0.79% from other races, and 1.1% from two or more races. Hispanic or Latino people of any race were 1.9% of the population.

There were 4,421 households, out of which 18.9% had children under the age of 18 living with them, 33.5% were married couples living together, 18.8% had a female householder with no husband present, and 44.0% were non-families. 35.2% of all households were made up of individuals, and 13.1% had someone living alone who was 65 years of age or older. The average household size was 2.23 and the average family size was 2.88.

In the city, the population was spread out, with 17.7% under the age of 18, 28.6% from 18 to 24, 21.0% from 25 to 44, 17.5% from 45 to 64, and 15.2% who were 65 years of age or older. The median age was 28 years. For every 100 females, there were 76.2 males. For every 100 females age 18 and over, there were 71.0 males.

The median income for a household in the city was $30,306, and the median income for a family was $37,008. Males had a median income of $30,310 versus $21,935 for females. The per capita income for the city was $15,263. About 17.9% of families and 24.7% of the population were below the poverty line, including 34.7% of those under age 18 and 14.8% of those age 65 or over.

== Government and crime ==
=== Government ===
The city operates under the council-manager form of government. The governing body is composed of a mayor and six members. The mayor is determined through a nonpartisan, at-large election for a four-year term of office while Council Members are chosen through nonpartisan, single-member district (SMD) elections. Council members are elected to staggered four-year terms of office.

The city council is a legislative body, establishing policies with recommendations from the professional city administrator, who is hired by the council. The city administrator acts as the chief administrator of the council's policies implemented through the administrative control of city departments given to him by ordinance.

Mayor

- Michael C. Butler

Council members

- Jordan Hawkins - District 1
- Kalu Kalu - District 2 (mayor pro tem)
- Jerry Hannah - District 3
- Annette Dees Grevious - District 4
- L. Zimmerman Keitt - District 5
- Sandra P. Knotts - District 6

State senators

- Brad Hutto
- Jeffrey Zell
- Tom Fernandez

=== Crime ===
The following table shows Orangeburg's crime rate in six crimes that Morgan Quitno uses in its calculations for "America's most dangerous cities" rankings, in comparison to 10,000 people. The statistics provided are not for the actual number of crimes committed, but for the number of crimes committed per capita.

Crime	Orangeburg, SC (2009)	per 10,000 people
Murder	1	.75
Rape	9	6.78
Robbery	36	25.61
Assault	35	26.36
Burglary	232	174.73
Automobile theft	65	48.95
Arson	2	1.51

== Education ==
=== Colleges and universities ===
- Claflin University, founded in 1869, is the oldest historically black university in the state of South Carolina. In 2014 it was ranked by Washington Monthly as the top liberal arts college in the state and the top HBCU in the country.
- South Carolina State University is a 4-year public historically Black institution in Orangeburg, founded in 1896.
- Orangeburg–Calhoun Technical College is a member of the American Association of Community Colleges and is accredited by the Commission on Colleges of the Southern Association of Colleges and Schools (SACS) to award associate degrees.

=== Public schools ===
- Orangeburg Consolidated School District Three
- Consolidated School District Four
- Orangeburg Consolidated School District Five
- Orangeburg-Wilkinson Senior High School

=== Charter schools ===
- OCSD5 High School for Health Professions
- Felton Laboratory Charter School

=== Private schools ===
- Orangeburg Preparatory Schools, Inc.
- Orangeburg Christian Academy

=== Library ===
Orangeburg has a public library, a branch of the Orangeburg County Library.

== Media ==
The Times and Democrat serves as the daily newspaper for the Orangeburg area.

== Transportation ==
=== Terminals ===
- Orangeburg Municipal Airport
- Greyhound
- Southeastern Stages

=== Highways ===
- U.S. Route 301
- U.S. Route 601
- U.S. Route 21
- U.S. Route 178
- South Carolina Highway 4
- South Carolina Highway 33
- Interstate 26 (via Exits 145, 149 and 154)

== Events and attractions ==
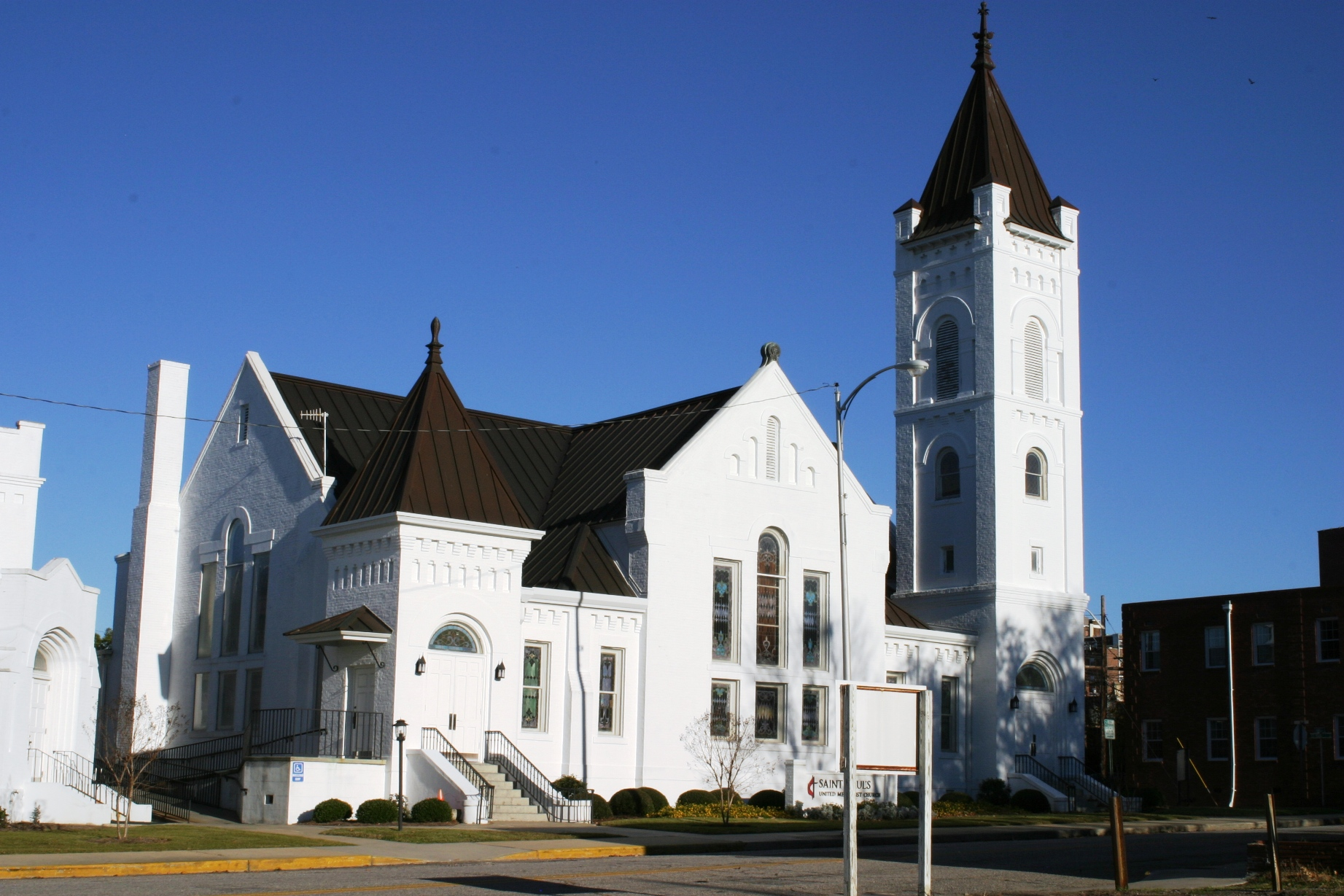
St. Paul's United Methodist Church, Orangeburg, South Carolina

=== Garden ===
The Edisto Memorial Gardens displays past and current award-winning roses from the All-American Rose Selections. Some 4,000 plants representing at least 75 labeled varieties of roses are always on display in the Gardens. The site was first developed in the 1920s with azaleas on 5 acres (20,000 m^{2}) of land. A playground was added in 1922, and a greenhouse and nursery facility in 1947. To extend the season of beauty, the first rose garden was planted in 1951. Currently, there are more than 50 beds of roses ranging from miniatures from grandiflora to climbers on over 150 acres (0.61 km^{2}) of land.

=== Museum ===
The IP Stanback Museum & Planetarium, named for the first African-American chairman of the university's board of trustees, Israel Pinkney Stanback, had its origin in the basement of the then South Carolina State College's library in the early 1970s. The Museum and Planetarium is located on the campus of South Carolina State University and signifies their commitment to community service. The Museum's exhibition area is one of the largest in the state. Its forty-foot planetarium dome, located across the foyer adjacent to the galleries, has an auditorium capacity of eighty-two seats and a Minolta IIB Planetarium Projector. The building is easily accessible to the handicapped and is a uniquely adaptable facility, capable of hosting many different types of presentations.

=== Festivals ===
The Orangeburg Festival of Roses began as a vision held by a group of citizens seeking a way to enhance the development of Orangeburg and improve the quality of life for its residents. As a result of that vision, the first festival was held in 1972. The Greater Orangeburg Chamber of Commerce was the sole sponsor of that first festival. At present the City of Orangeburg and the Orangeburg County Chamber of Commerce are co-sponsors of the event. The festival includes such events as a river race, a basscatcher tournament, the Princess of Roses pageant, and various sports tournaments.

During the winter in Orangeburg, more festivities get under way when raccoon hunters from throughout the Southeast gather for the Grand American Coon Hunt. The hunt, which takes place each year in early January, in the largest field trial for coon dogs in the United States and is a qualifying event for the World Coon Hunt.

=== Landmarks ===
The following notable buildings and districts are listed on the National Register of Historic Places:

- Alan Mack Site (38OR67)
- All-Star Triangle Bowl
- Amelia Street Historic District
- Claflin College Historic District
- Dixie Library Building
- Donald Bruce House
- Dukes Gymnasium
- East Russell Street Area Historic District
- Ellis Avenue Historic District
- Enterprise Cotton Mills Building
- F.H.W. Briggman House
- Great Branch Teacherage
- Hodge Hall
- Hotel Eutaw
- Lowman Hall, South Carolina State College
- Maj. John Hammond Fordham House
- Mt. Pisgah Baptist Church
- Orangeburg City Cemetery
- Orangeburg County Fair Main Exhibit Building
- Orangeburg County Jail
- Orangeburg Downtown Historic District
- South Carolina State College Historic District
- Tingley Memorial Hall, Claflin College
- Treadwell Street Historic District
- Trinity Methodist Episcopal Church
- White House United Methodist Church
- Whitman Street Area Historic District
- William P. Stroman House
- Williams Chapel A.M.E. Church

== Notable people ==
- Donnie Abraham, football player for East Tennessee State University, Tampa Bay Buccaneers, New York Jets
- Thomas G. Andrews, attorney and associate justice of the Oklahoma Supreme Court
- Alex Barron, Florida State tackle, drafted by the St. Louis Rams 19th overall in the 2005 NFL draft
- Shelton Benjamin, professional wrestler currently signed to All Elite Wrestling
- Gloria Blackwell, educator and civil rights activist
- Jim Clyburn, congressman, South Carolina State University alumnus, class of 1961
- Choo-Choo Coleman, former baseball catcher for two teams
- Monique Coleman, actress and singer
- Angell Conwell, actress, born in Orangeburg
- Bob Corker, U.S. senator from Tennessee
- Don Covay, musician
- Xzavion Curry, Major League Baseball player
- Woodrow Dantzler, football player
- Manish Dayal (born 1983), actor
- Ralph B. Everett, president and CEO of the Joint Center for Political and Economic Studies
- Abby Fisher (c. 1831–1915), one of the first African-American cookbook authors
- Terry Guess, NFL wide receiver
- Michael Hackett (born 1960), basketball player
- Nikki Haley, former governor of South Carolina
- Jaime Harrison, chairman of the Democratic National Committee and South Carolina Democratic Party
- Deveron Harper, National Football League player
- Dwayne Harper, professional football cornerback
- Israel Hicks (1943–2010), stage director
- Corinne Stocker Horton (1871–1947), elocutionist and journalist
- Brad Hutto, minority leader of the South Carolina Senate
- David Flavel Jamison, state politician and judge
- Tim Jennings, University of Georgia cornerback
- Brice Johnson, basketball star at the University of North Carolina
- Xavier Johnson, American Greco-Roman wrestler
- Maurice Kelly, NFL and CFL player
- Mikki Moore, professional basketball player who has played for nine teams
- Mike O'Cain, college football coach
- Benjamin F. Payton (1932–2016), president of Tuskegee University 1981–2010
- Walter Merritt Riggs (1873–1924), engineering professor, President of Clemson University
- Curtis C. Robinson (1919–2009), former U.S. Army Air Force officer with the prodigious Tuskegee Airmen
- Eugene Robinson (born 1955), op-ed columnist, The Washington Post
- Rusty Russell, football player for several teams
- John Jarvis Seabrook (1899–1975), theologian, Methodist pastor
- Bakari Sellers, politician and CNN commentator
- Mike Sharperson (1961–1996), Major League Baseball player for several teams
- Dick Sheridan, college football coach
- Shawnee Smith, actress and musician; born in Orangeburg
- Steve Sonic, musician
- Bill Spiers, Major League Baseball player for three teams
- Archie Spigner, New York City Council member; born in Orangeburg
- Cecil Williams, civil rights activist, author and inventor
- Johnny Williams, jazz musician with the Count Basie Orchestra
- Karen J. Williams, chief judge of the United States Court of Appeals for the Fourth Circuit
- Herm Winningham, Major League Baseball player and World Series champion
