= Maj. John Hammond Fordham House =

Historic house in South Carolina, United States

- U.S. National Register of Historic Places
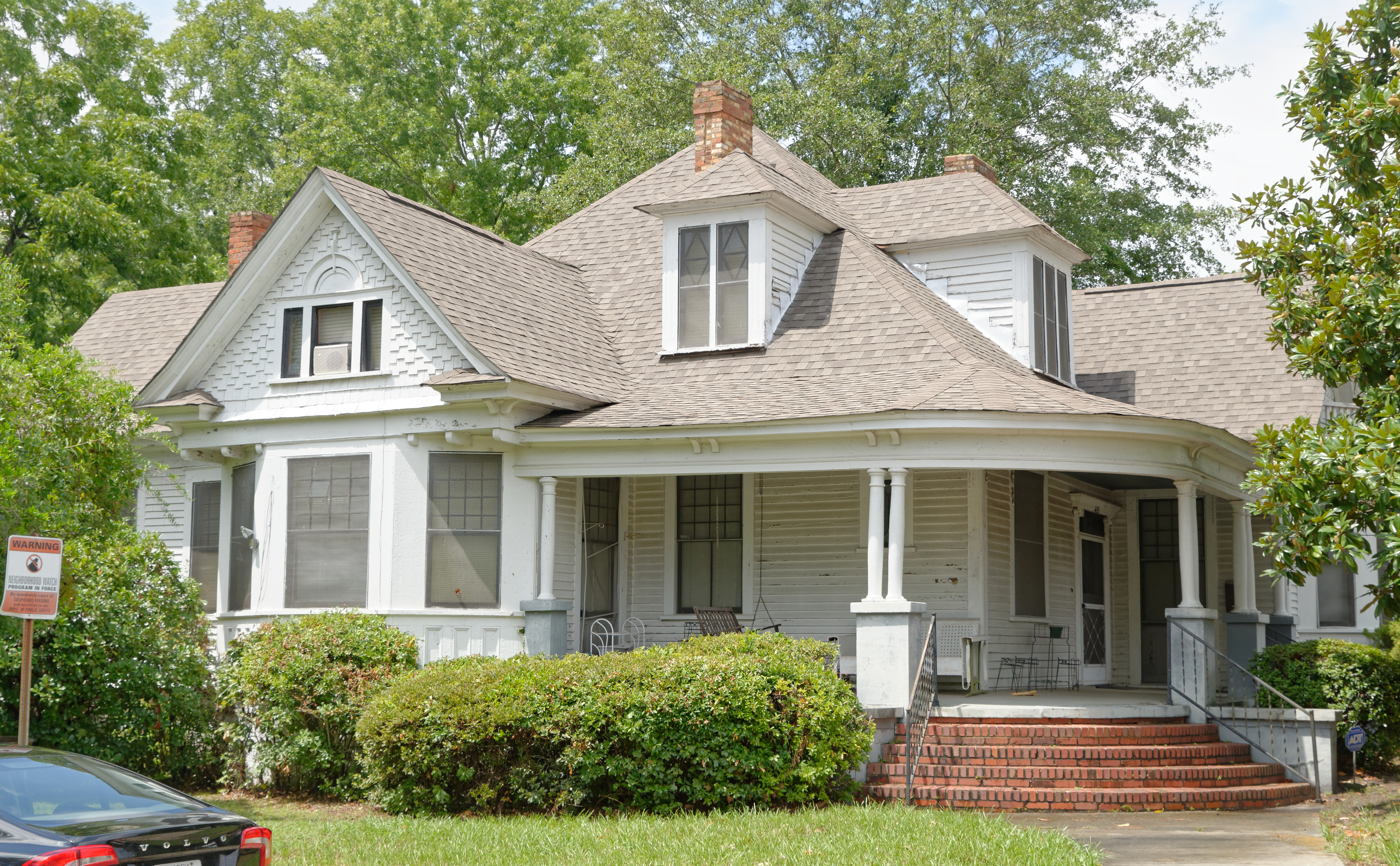

- Location within South Carolina Location within the United States
- Location: 415 Boulevard St., Orangeburg, South Carolina
- Coordinates: 33°29′58″N 80°51′20″W
- Area: 0.5 acres (0.20 ha)
- Built: 1903
- Architect: William W. Cooke
- Architectural style: Palladian
- MPS: Orangeburg MRA
- NRHP reference No.: 85002341
- Added to NRHP: September 20, 1985

The Maj. John Hammond Fordham House is a historic home located in Orangeburg, South Carolina, United States. It was built in 1903, and is a 1½-story, Victorian frame cottage. It was the home of Maj. John Hammond Fordham, a prominent African-American citizen of Orangeburg.

Major Fordham was the maternal great-grandfather of Pulitzer Prize-winning Washington Post journalist Eugene Robinson who was born and raised in the Orangeburg house, which he and his younger sister, Ellen, still own.

Maj. Fordham was the son of Henry Fordham, a former slave who was able to buy his own freedom in 1850. Maj. Fordham was educated at Avery Normal Institute and became a lawyer active in the Republican Party, once serving as a county coroner. He and his wife, Louisa, had at least three children: a son, Marion — a pharmacist and WWI veteran — and daughters Flora Ella and Sadie Fordham Smith.

The Fordham House was added to the National Register of Historic Places in 1985.
