= Donald Bruce House =

Historic house in South Carolina, United States

- U.S. National Register of Historic Places
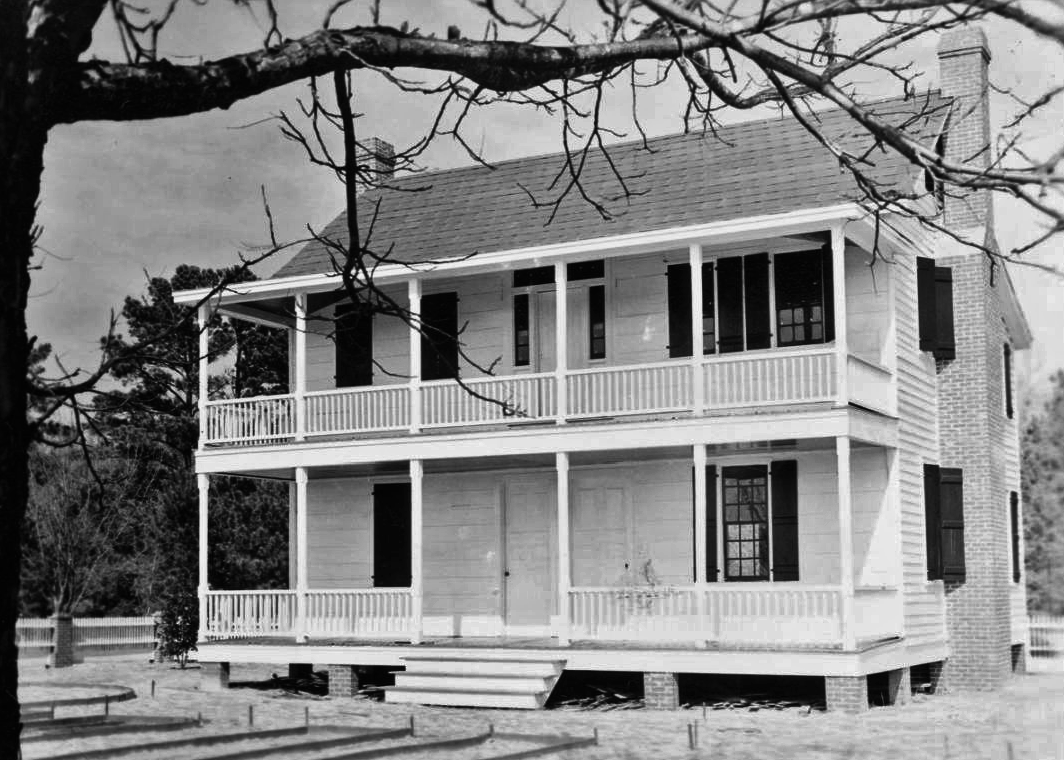
- Middlepen Plantation was photographed as part of a federal WPA project.

- Location within South Carolina Location within the United States
- Location: Southeast of Orangeburg on U.S. Route 301, near Orangeburg, South Carolina
- Coordinates: 33°28′36″N 80°48′53″W
- Area: 0.5 acres (0.20 ha)
- Built: c. 1837
- NRHP reference No.: 78002528
- Added to NRHP: December 1, 1978

Donald Bruce House, also known as Middlepen Plantation, is a historic plantation home located near Orangeburg, Orangeburg County, South Carolina. It was originally built during the 18th century in downtown Orangeburg and was moved to Middlepen Plantation about 1837. The house is a two-story frame structure with a two-tiered front piazza. It was used as headquarters during the American Revolution at different times by both Governor John Rutledge and by the British commander, Lord Francis Rawdon.

It was added to the National Register of Historic Places in 1978. The house is not open to public tours.
