= All-Star Triangle Bowl =

Bowling alley in Orangeburg, South Carolina, USA

- All Star Bowling Lane
- U.S. National Register of Historic Places
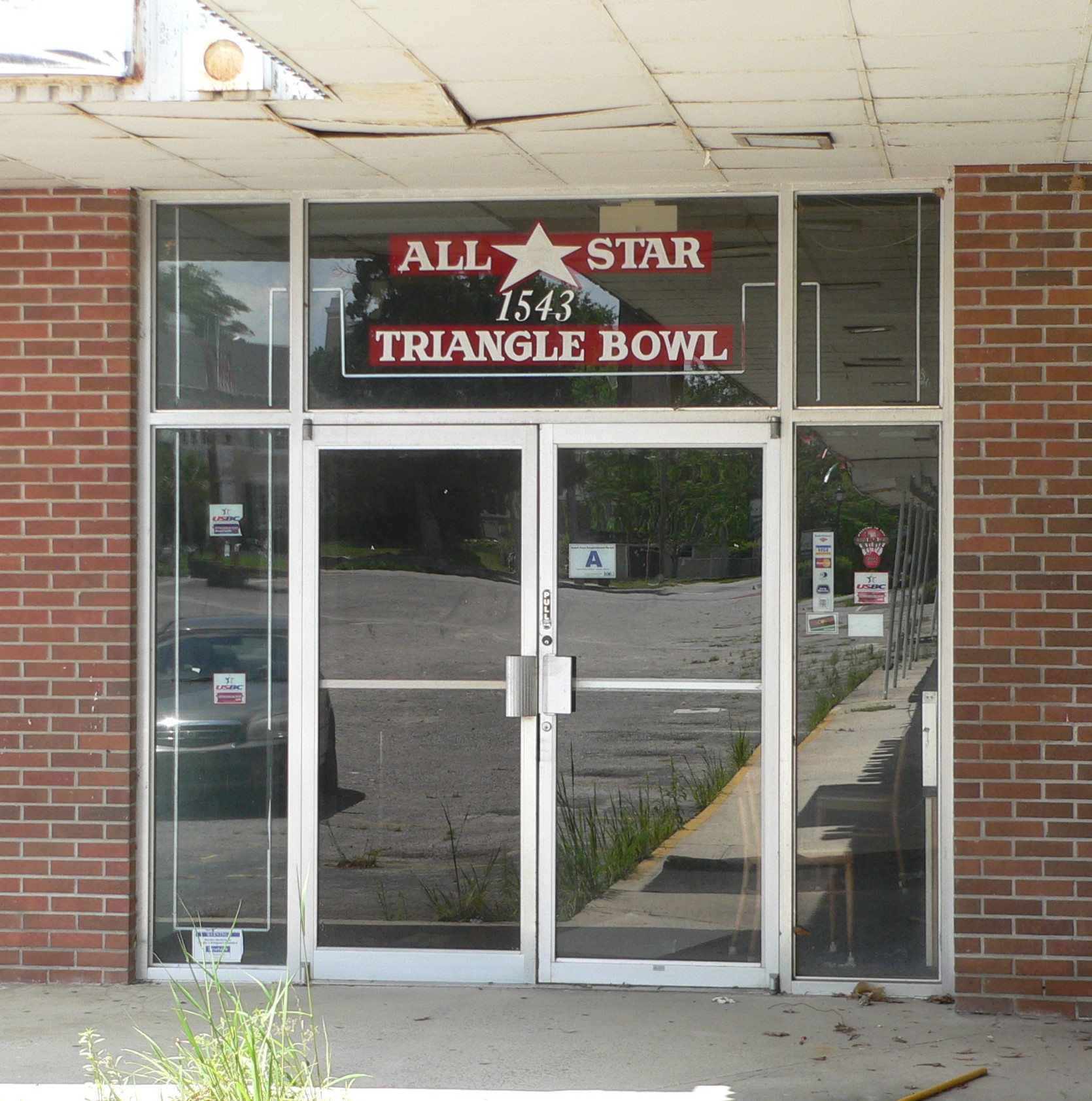
- All-Star Triangle Bowl in 2015

- Location within South Carolina Location within the United States
- Location: 559 E. Russell St., Orangeburg, South Carolina
- Coordinates: 33.4929°N 80.859515°W
- Built: 1962
- NRHP reference No.: 96000837
- Added to NRHP: August 7, 1996 Civil Rights Movement in Orangeburg County MPS

All-Star Triangle Bowl (formerly All-Star Bowling Lane) is a former bowling alley located in Orangeburg, South Carolina, United States. The 16 lanes in total are a historic fixture of the community. For its role in the civil rights movement, the All-Star Triangle Bowl was added to the National Register of Historic Places in 1996.

== Opening ==
The bowling alley opened on March 3, 1962. The original owner was Harry K. Floyd, and it originally housed both AMF's Magic Triangle systems and 82-30 pinsetters.

== Orangeburg Massacre ==
Map showing State College, the bowling alley, and surroundings

All-Star Triangle Bowl is known for its fundamental role in the Orangeburg Massacre at South Carolina State University, which was sparked as a result of Floyd refusing to allow people of color to bowl at the privately owned bowling alley, which was then called All Star Bowling Lane.

== Closing ==
Floyd owned and operated the alley until his death on July 12, 2002, following which his son, Harry K. Floyd, Jr., took over. Due to financial difficulties, the Floyd family closed the bowling alley in August 2007.

== Restoration ==
In September 2020 an Orangeburg-based nonprofit, the Center for Creative Partnerships, purchased the property with the plan of turning it into a memorial for the civil rights movement in the city.

All Star Bowling Lane became part of the National Park Service African American Civil Rights Network in June 2021 and the National Park Service has highlighted the restoration efforts and provided a $500,000 grant in 2022. Work began on restoration in February 2022, with an event held to mark the 54th anniversary of the massacre. Construction work has taken place in phases.

In April 2024, the National Park Service provided an additional $750,000 in grant funds.
