= Amelia Street Historic District =

Historic district in South Carolina, United States

- U.S. National Register of Historic Places
- U.S. Historic district
- Location within South Carolina Location within the United States
- Location: Amelia St. between Treadwell St. & Summers Ave., Orangeburg, South Carolina
- Coordinates: 33°29′39″N 80°51′37″W
- Area: 12 acres (4.9 ha)
- Architect: Multiple
- MPS: Orangeburg MRA
- NRHP reference No.: 85002322
- Added to NRHP: September 20, 1985

Amelia Street Historic District is a national historic district located at Orangeburg, Orangeburg County, South Carolina. The district encompasses 15 contributing buildings in a residential section of Orangeburg. They include residences constructed between 1890 and 1929, and distinguished by large, two-story, frame houses with Victorian decorative woodwork.

It was added to the National Register of Historic Places in 1985.
