= Orangeburg County Jail =

- U.S. National Register of Historic Places
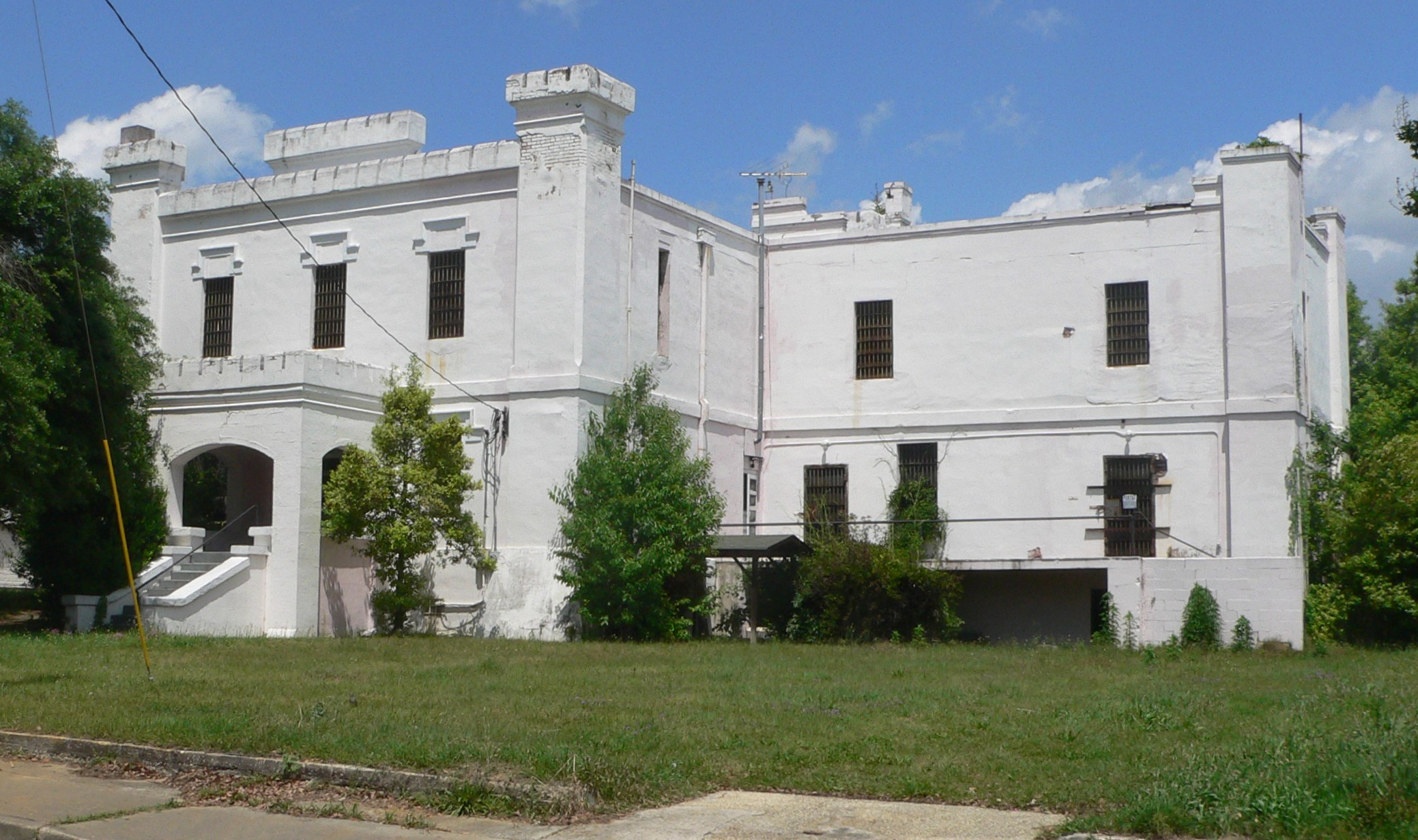

- Location within South Carolina Location within the United States
- Location: 44 Saint John St., Orangeburg, South Carolina
- Coordinates: 33.489540°N 80.861552°W
- Built: 1857-1860
- Built by: Lucas, John
- Architect: Jones, Edward C., & Lee, Francis D.
- Architectural style: Late Gothic Revival, Neo-Gothic
- NRHP reference No.: 73001724
- Added to NRHP: October 2, 1973

The (Old) Orangeburg County Jail, also known as The Pink Palace, is a historic jail located at Orangeburg, Orangeburg County, South Carolina. It was built between 1857 and 1860, and is a two-story, rectangular, cement-covered brick building in the Late Gothic Revival style. It features a crenellated main tower and corner turrets. General William Tecumseh Sherman’s troops burned the building in February 1865; it was subsequently restored.

It was added to the National Register of Historic Places in 1973.

Orangeburg County inmates are now kept in the Orangeburg-Calhoun Regional Detention Center.
