= Orangeburg County Fair Main Exhibit Building =

- U.S. National Register of Historic Places
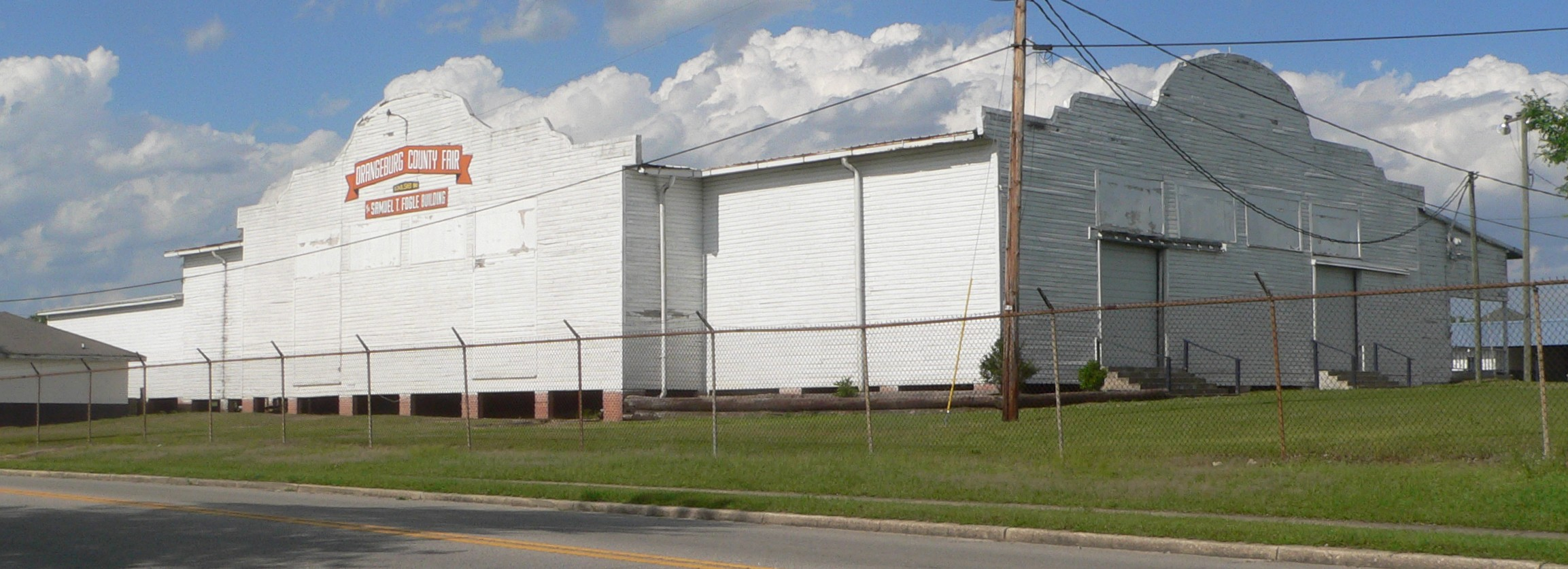

- Location within South Carolina Location within the United States
- Location: U.S. 21, Orangeburg, South Carolina
- Coordinates: 33.480274°N 80.852768°W
- Area: 3.3 acres (1.3 ha)
- Built: 1911
- Built by: Johannsen, Heinrich H.
- MPS: Orangeburg MRA
- NRHP reference No.: 85002344
- Added to NRHP: September 20, 1985

Orangeburg County Fair Main Exhibit Building is a historic county fair exhibition hall and grandstand located at Orangeburg, Orangeburg County, South Carolina. It was built in 1911, and is a one-story, rectangular, frame building. It sits on an open, brick pier foundation and has shiplap siding and a low-pitched gable roof.

It was added to the National Register of Historic Places in 1985.
