= Whitman Street Area Historic District =

Historic district in South Carolina, United States

- U.S. National Register of Historic Places
- U.S. Historic district
- Location within South Carolina Location within the United States
- Location: Along sections of Whitman, Elliot, and E. Russell Sts., Orangeburg, South Carolina
- Coordinates: 33°29′28″N 80°51′29″W
- Area: 11 acres (4.5 ha)
- Architect: Multiple
- Architectural style: Queen Anne
- MPS: Orangeburg MRA
- NRHP reference No.: 85002326
- Added to NRHP: September 20, 1985

Whitman Street Area Historic District is a national historic district located at Orangeburg, Orangeburg County, South Carolina. The district encompasses 12 contributing buildings in a residential section of Orangeburg. They include large, two-story frame houses constructed in the late-19th and early-20th century. The houses are in a variety of popular architectural styles including Victorian, Queen Anne, Classical Revival, and Colonial Revival.

It was added to the National Register of Historic Places in 1985.
