= Norway, South Carolina =

- Town
- Downtown Norway

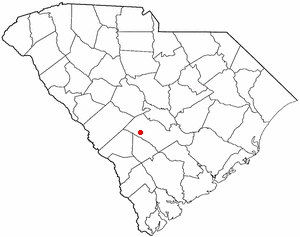
- Location of Norway, South Carolina
- Coordinates: 33°27′01″N 81°07′27″W
- Country: United States
- State: South Carolina
- County: Orangeburg

Area
  - Total: 0.80 sq mi (2.07 km^{2})
  - Land: 0.79 sq mi (2.05 km^{2})
  - Water: 0.0039 sq mi (0.01 km^{2})
- Elevation: 236 ft (72 m)

Population (2020)
  - Total: 289
  - Density: 364.9/sq mi (140.88/km^{2})
- Time zone: UTC-5 (Eastern (EST))
  - Summer (DST): UTC-4 (EDT)
- ZIP code: 29113
- Area codes: 803, 839
- FIPS code: 45-51550
- GNIS feature ID: 2407010
- Website: townofnorwaysc.com

Norway is a town in Orangeburg County, South Carolina, United States. As of the 2020 census, Norway had a population of 289.

== History ==
Norway was laid out in 1891 when the railroad was extended to that point. A post office has been in operation at Norway since 1892. The town was so named in order to fit with the railroad's "Scandinavian" naming scheme; other such examples include Sweden, Denmark and Finland, South Carolina.

The Willow Consolidated High School was added to the National Register of Historic Places in 2006.

=== Race riot ===
On July 4, 1903, the majority African-American population rose in protest, in reaction to the lynching on July 1 of resident Charles Evans, who was suspected of killing disabled Confederate veteran John T. Phillips. Along with the lynching of Evans, two other black residents of Norway were beaten by a white mob, with one later dying of his injuries. According to news reports at the time, the murder of Phillips was perpetrated in revenge for Phillips' son whipping black workers. Nearly 200 armed black residents took over the town before a militia was called by Governor Duncan Clinch Heyward to restore white control. At the time, only 50 of Norway's 200 residents were white.

== Geography ==
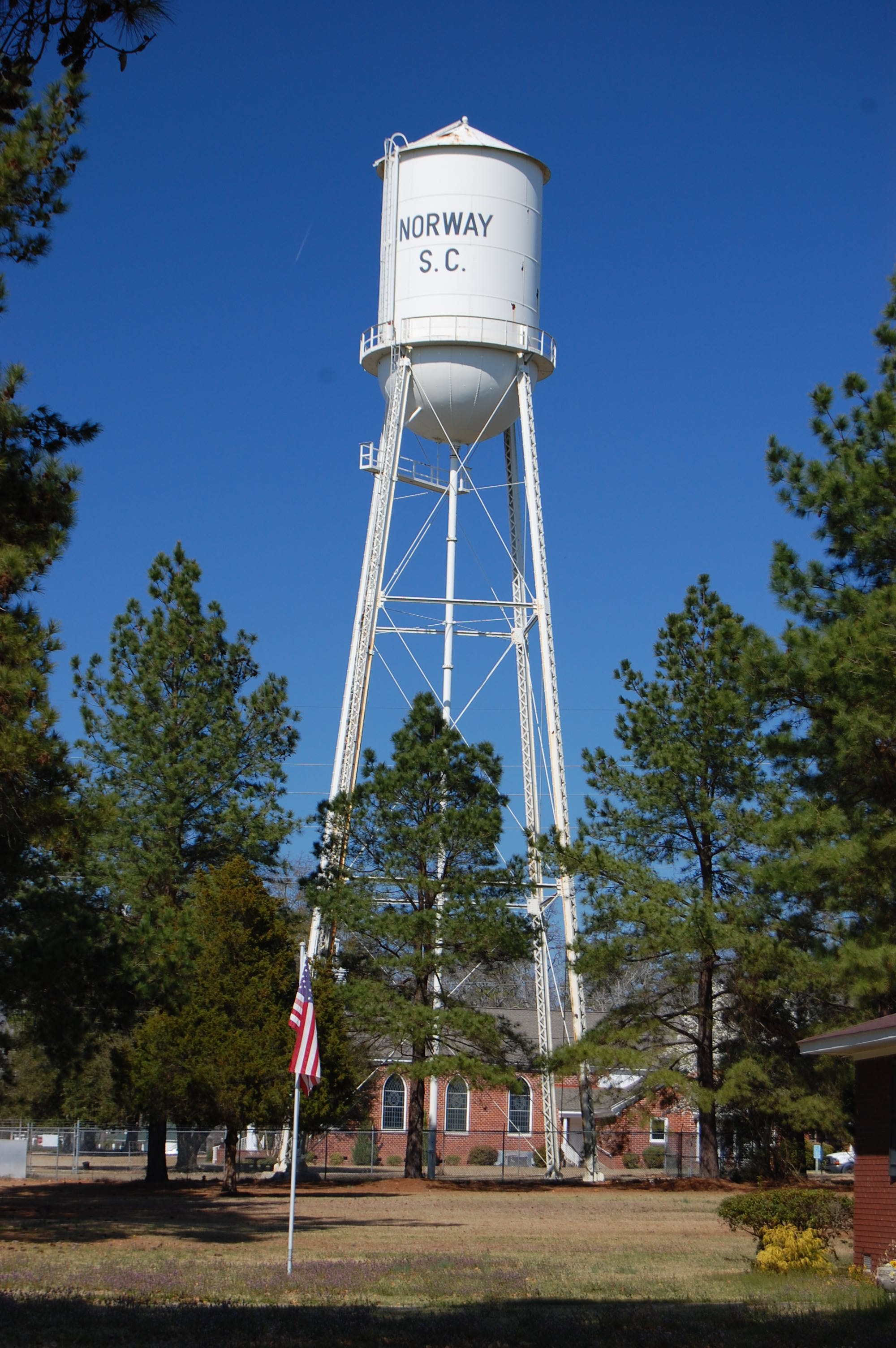
Photo of water tower in downtown Norway

According to the United States Census Bureau, the town has a total area of 0.8 square miles (2.1 km^{2}), of which 0.8 square miles (2.1 km^{2}) is land and 1.19% is water.

== Demographics ==
Historical population
Census	Pop.	Note	%±
1900	218		—
1910	315		44.5%
1920	474		50.5%
1930	494		4.2%
1940	488		−1.2%
1950	476		−2.5%
1960	525		10.3%
1970	579		10.3%
1980	518		−10.5%
1990	401		−22.6%
2000	389		−3.0%
2010	337		−13.4%
2020	289		−14.2%
U.S. Decennial Census

=== 2020 census ===
Norway town, South Carolina – Racial and ethnic composition Note: the US Census treats Hispanic/Latino as an ethnic category. This table excludes Latinos from the racial categories and assigns them to a separate category. Hispanics/Latinos may be of any race.
Race / Ethnicity (NH = Non-Hispanic)	Pop 2000	Pop 2010	Pop 2020	% 2000	% 2010	% 2020
White alone (NH)	194	134	100	49.87%	39.76%	34.60%
Black or African American alone (NH)	173	182	168	44.47%	54.01%	58.13%
Native American or Alaska Native alone (NH)	2	2	1	0.51%	0.59%	0.35%
Asian alone (NH)	1	0	1	0.26%	0.00%	0.35%
Native Hawaiian or Pacific Islander alone (NH)	0	0	1	0.00%	0.00%	0.35%
Other race alone (NH)	3	0	0	0.77%	0.00%	0.00%
Mixed race or Multiracial (NH)	10	6	15	2.57%	1.78%	5.19%
Hispanic or Latino (any race)	6	13	3	1.54%	3.86%	1.04%
Total	389	337	289	100.00%	100.00%	100.00%

As of the census of 2000, there were 389 people, 153 households, and 104 families residing in the town. The population density was 465.5 inhabitants per square mile (179.7/km^{2}). There were 164 housing units at an average density of 196.3 per square mile (75.8/km^{2}). The racial makeup of the town was 50.39% White, 45.24% African American, 0.51% Native American, 0.26% Asian, 0.77% from other races, and 2.83% from two or more races. Hispanic or Latino of any race were 1.54% of the population.

There were 153 households, out of which 26.1% had children under the age of 18 living with them, 43.8% were married couples living together, 20.3% had a female householder with no husband present, and 32.0% were non-families. 28.8% of all households were made up of individuals, and 11.8% had someone living alone who was 65 years of age or older. The average household size was 2.54 and the average family size was 3.17.

In the town, the population was spread out, with 25.2% under the age of 18, 8.5% from 18 to 24, 23.7% from 25 to 44, 25.4% from 45 to 64, and 17.2% who were 65 years of age or older. The median age was 41 years. For every 100 females, there were 103.7 males. For every 100 females age 18 and over, there were 91.4 males.

The median income for a household in the town was $27,083, and the median income for a family was $34,000. Males had a median income of $32,031 versus $19,250 for females. The per capita income for the town was $18,864. About 20.8% of families and 30.4% of the population were below the poverty line, including 48.0% of those under age 18 and 28.6% of those age 65 or over.
