= Orangeburg City Cemetery =

Cemetery in South Carolina, US

- U.S. National Register of Historic Places
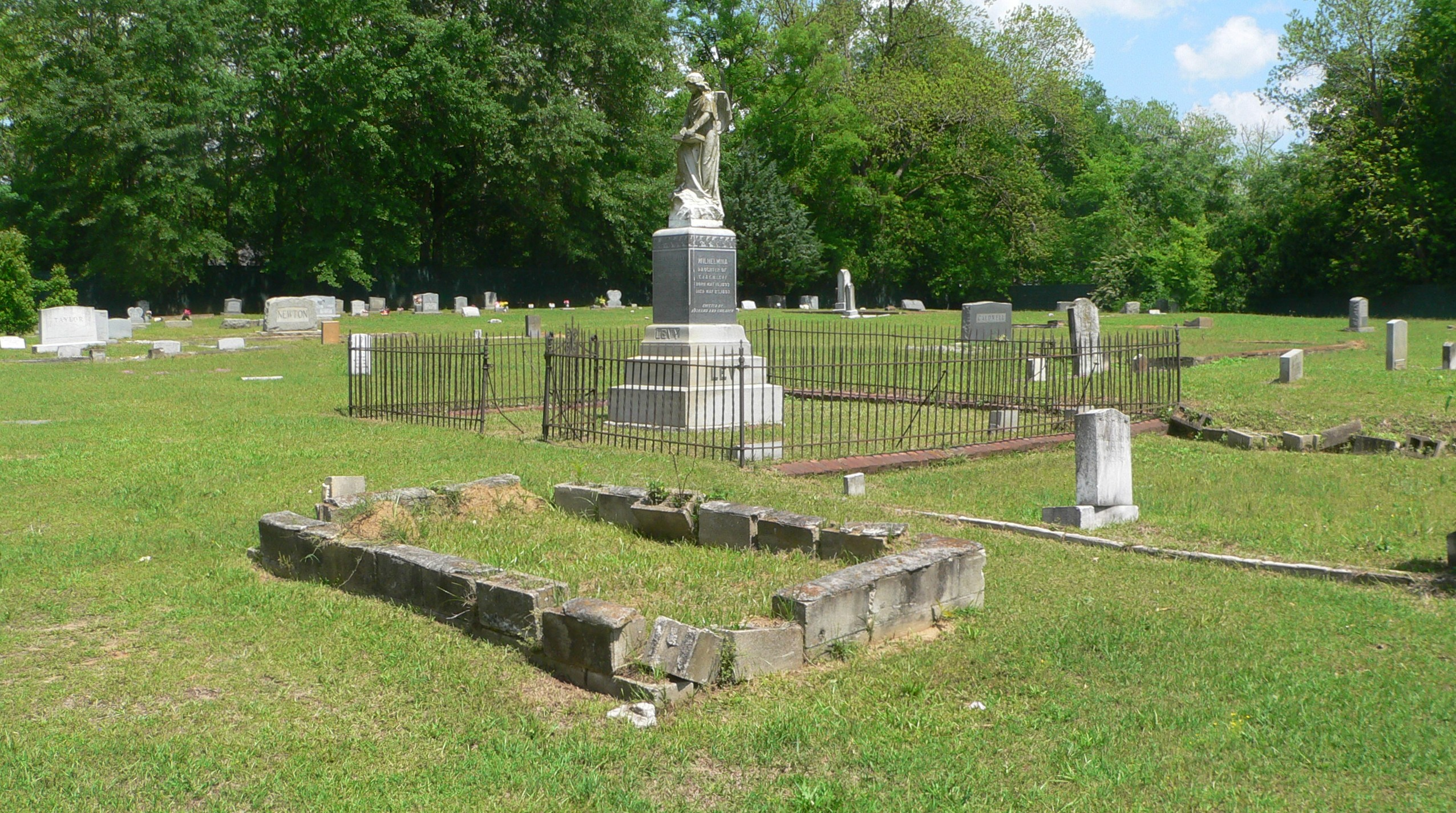

- Location within South Carolina Location within the United States
- Location: Jct. of Bull and Windsor Sts., Orangeburg, South Carolina
- Coordinates: 33.489154°N 80.870756°W
- Area: 5 acres (2.0 ha)
- Built: 1889
- MPS: Orangeburg MRA
- NRHP reference No.: 96001025
- Added to NRHP: September 27, 1996

Orangeburg City Cemetery is a historic African-American cemetery located at Orangeburg, Orangeburg County, South Carolina. It was established in 1889 and is a five-acre tract containing approximately 300 to 350 burial plots. Most burials date from about 1890 to the 1960s.

It was added to the National Register of Historic Places in 1996.

== Notable burials ==
- Johnson C. Whittaker (1858–1931), West Point cadet who was expelled, exonerated, and posthumously awarded a US Army officer commission
