= Great Branch Teacherage =

Historic house in South Carolina, United States

- U.S. National Register of Historic Places
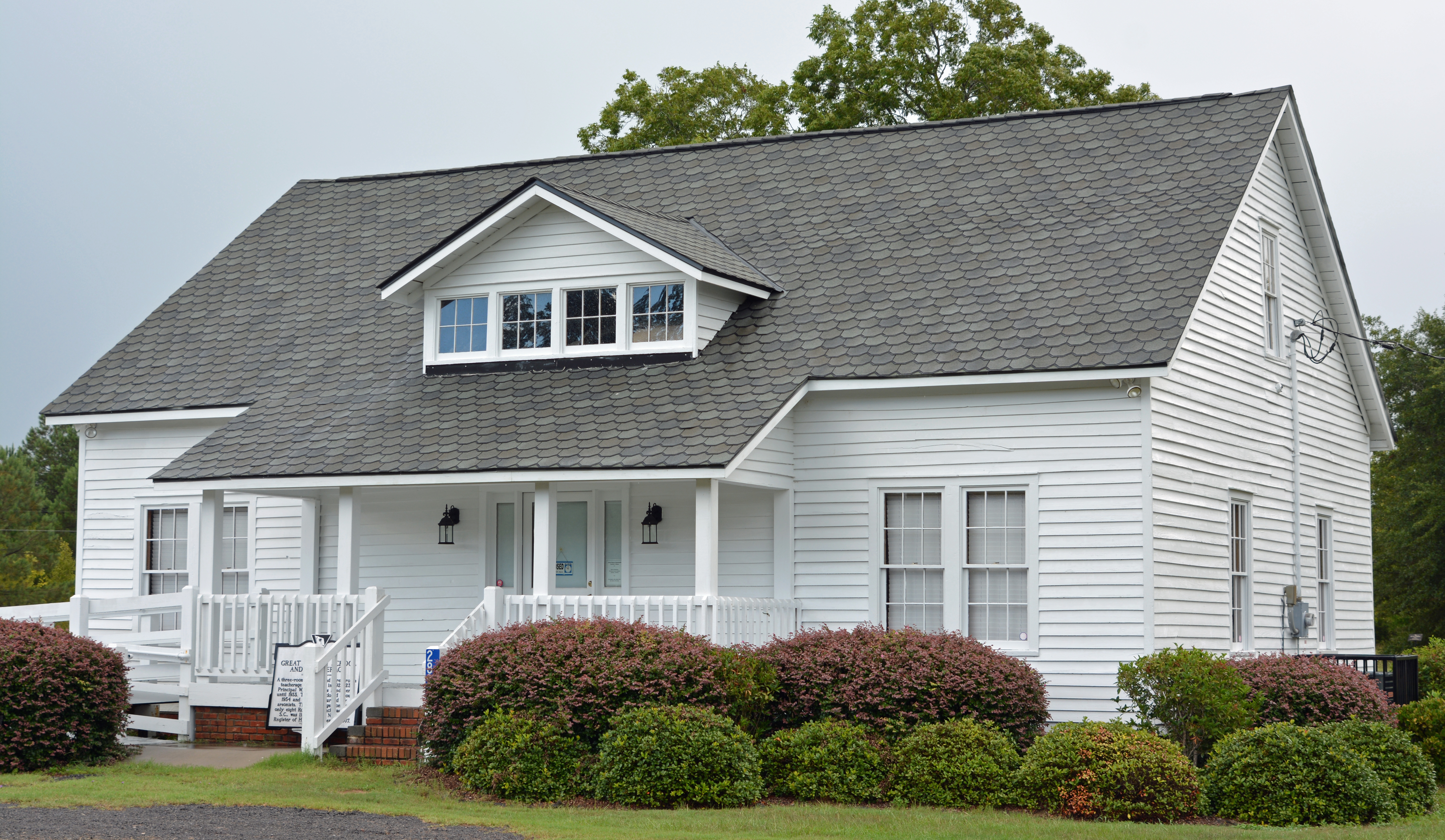

- Location within South Carolina Location within the United States
- Location: 2890 Neeses Highway, near Orangeburg, South Carolina
- Coordinates: 33.5229°N 81.0028°W
- Area: less than one acre
- Built: 1924-1925
- Architectural style: American Folk Tradition
- NRHP reference No.: 07001112
- Added to NRHP: October 24, 2007

Great Branch Teacherage, also known as Great Branch Rosenwald School Teacherage, is a historic home and teacherage located near Orangeburg, South Carolina. It was built in 1924–1925, as part of the Great Branch School Rosenwald school complex. It is a one-story, three-room, frame building with a lateral gable roof. It is the only remaining building from the Great Branch School complex, which closed in 1954.

It was added to the National Register of Historic Places in 2007.
