= Treadwell Street Historic District =

Historic district in South Carolina, United States

- U.S. National Register of Historic Places
- U.S. Historic district
- Location within South Carolina Location within the United States
- Location: Along portions of Treadwell & Amelia Sts., Orangeburg, South Carolina
- Coordinates: 33°29′45″N 80°51′30″W
- Area: 11 acres (4.5 ha)
- Architect: Multiple
- Architectural style: Shotgun
- MPS: Orangeburg MRA
- NRHP reference No.: 85002315
- Added to NRHP: September 20, 1985

Treadwell Street Historic District is a national historic district located at Orangeburg, Orangeburg County, South Carolina. The district encompasses 39 contributing buildings in an African American residential section of Orangeburg. They include one-story, weatherboard frame dwellings dated between about 1890 and 1930. The houses are in a variety of popular architectural styles including Victorian and Bungalow.

It was added to the National Register of Historic Places in 1985.
