= Enterprise Cotton Mills Building =

- U.S. National Register of Historic Places
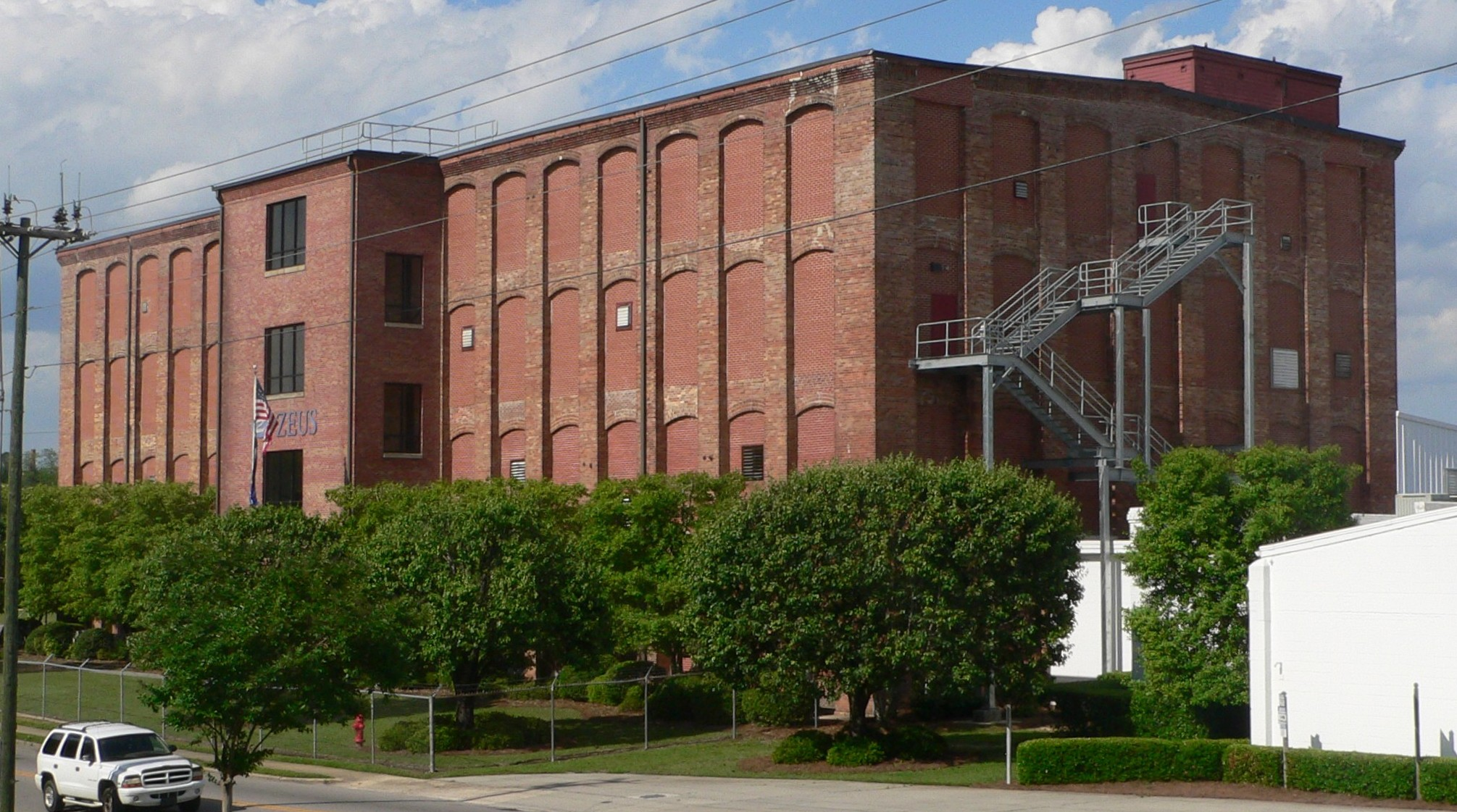

- Location within South Carolina Location within the United States
- Location: U.S. 21, Orangeburg, South Carolina
- Coordinates: 33.487161°N 80.853977°W
- Area: 5 acres (2.0 ha)
- Built: 1896-1897
- Architect: Whaley, W.B. Smith,& Co.
- MPS: Orangeburg MRA
- NRHP reference No.: 85002340
- Added to NRHP: September 20, 1985

Enterprise Cotton Mills Building, also known as Zeus Industrial Products, is a historic cotton mill located at Orangeburg, Orangeburg County, South Carolina. It was built in 1896–1897, and is a four-story, 17 bay by 7 bay, brick building with a five-story tower. Attached to the main building is a two-story brick engine room and a one-story brick boiler room.

It was added to the National Register of Historic Places in 1985.
