= Williams Chapel A.M.E. Church =

Historic church in South Carolina, United States

- U.S. National Register of Historic Places
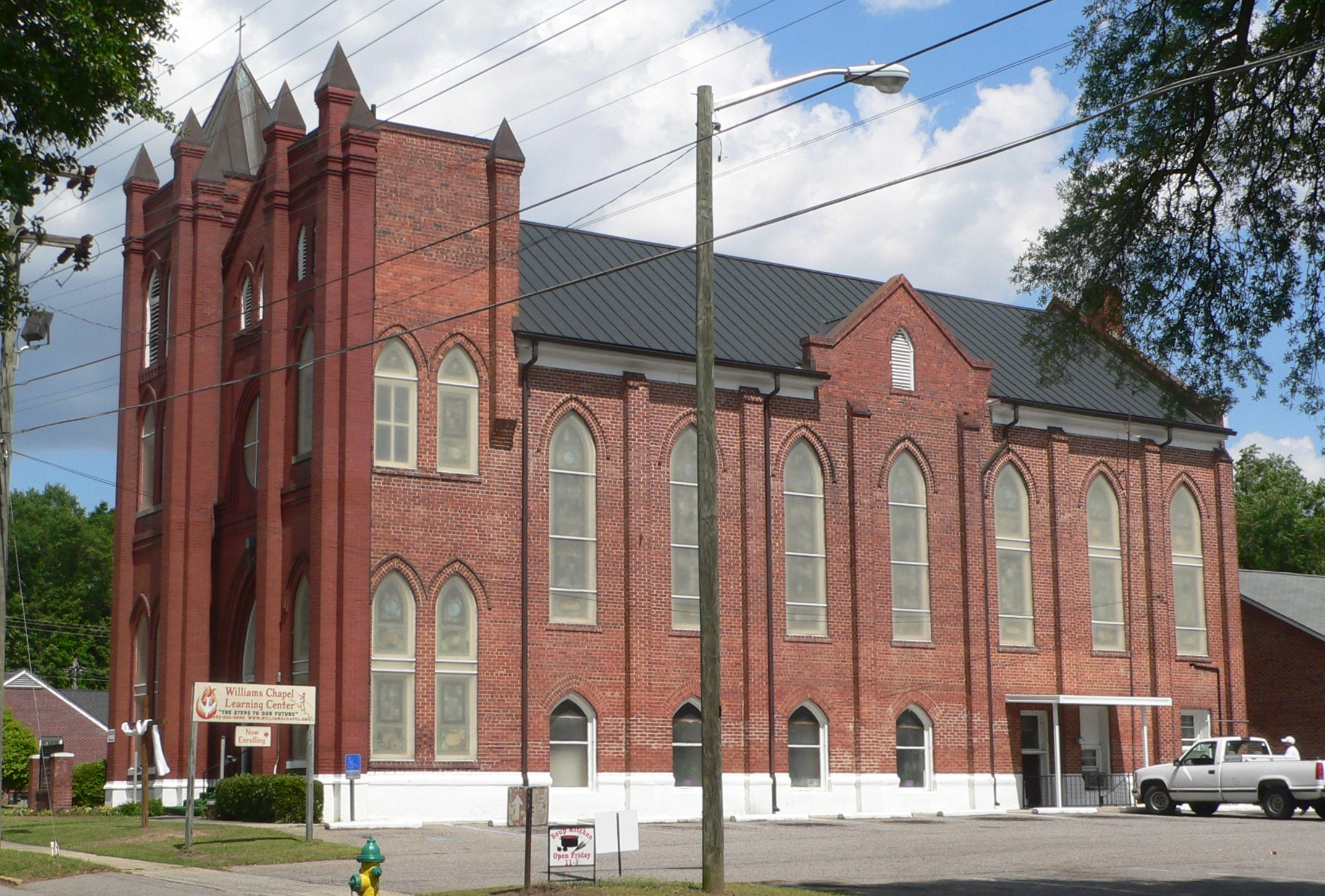

- Location within South Carolina Location within the United States
- Location: 1198 Glover St., Orangeburg, South Carolina
- Coordinates: 33.486266°N 80.860517°W
- Built: 1915-1925
- Architect: Whittaker, Miller F.; Minger, I.J.
- Architectural style: Gothic Revival
- MPS: Orangeburg MRA
- NRHP reference No.: 85002345
- Added to NRHP: September 20, 1985

Williams Chapel A.M.E. Church is a historic African Methodist Episcopal church located at 1198 Glover Street in Orangeburg, Orangeburg County, South Carolina. It was built between 1915 and 1925, and is a one-story, brick Gothic Revival-style church building on a raised basement. It features two towers on the facade with pyramidal roofs and Gothic arched stained glass windows.

It was added to the National Register of Historic Places in 1985.
