= Ellis Avenue Historic District =

Historic district in South Carolina, United States

- U.S. National Register of Historic Places
- U.S. Historic district
- Location within South Carolina Location within the United States
- Location: Along portion of Ellis Ave. between Summers Ave. & Wilson St., Orangeburg, South Carolina
- Coordinates: 33°29′53″N 80°51′47″W
- Area: 12 acres (4.9 ha)
- Architect: Urquhart, James B.; Lupo & Holcombe
- Architectural style: Collegiate
- MPS: Orangeburg MRA
- NRHP reference No.: 85002327
- Added to NRHP: September 20, 1985

Ellis Avenue Historic District is a national historic district located at Orangeburg, Orangeburg County, South Carolina. The district encompasses eight contributing buildings in a residential section of Orangeburg. They include seven residences dated to the turn of the 20th century, and a two-story brick school building (1931). The houses are in a variety of popular architectural styles including Victorian and Colonial Revival.

It was added to the National Register of Historic Places in 1985.
