= Dukes Gymnasium =

- U.S. National Register of Historic Places
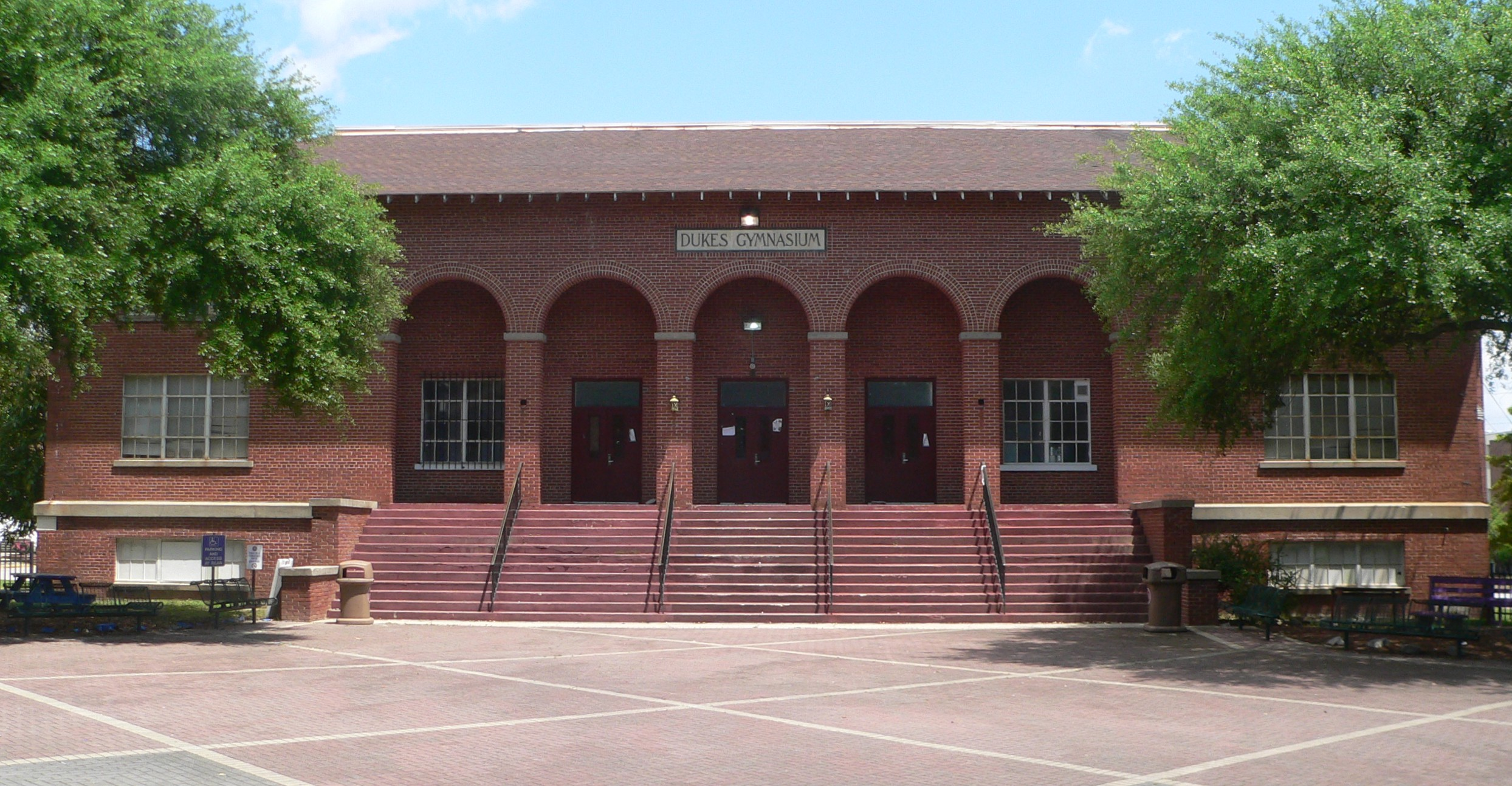

- Location within South Carolina Location within the United States
- Location: South Carolina State University campus, Orangeburg, South Carolina
- Coordinates: 33.497326°N 80.850374°W
- Built: 1931
- Architect: Blanche, John H.; Entzminger, Thomas J.
- MPS: Orangeburg MRA
- NRHP reference No.: 85002321
- Added to NRHP: September 20, 1985

Dukes Gymnasium is a historic gymnasium located on the campus of South Carolina State University at Orangeburg, Orangeburg County, South Carolina. It was built in 1931, and is a two-story, brick building with a full basement and a gable on hip roof. The front façade features a five-bay brick arcade. It is the home venue for the South Carolina State Bulldogs women's volleyball team.

It was added to the National Register of Historic Places in 1985.
