= List of African-American historic places in South Carolina =

List of African American Historic Places in South Carolina, 18th-20th century

This list of African American Historic Places in South Carolina was originally based on a report by the South Carolina Department of Archives & History through its South Carolina African American Heritage Commission. The first edition was originally based on the work of student interns from South Carolina State University or the 2021 update.

Some of these sites are on the National Register of Historic Places (NR) as independent sites or as a contributing property (CP) of a historic district. Several of the sites are National Historic Landmarks (NRL). Others have South Carolina historical markers (HM). The citation on historical markers is given in the reference. The location listed is the nearest community to the site. More precise locations are given in the reference.

These listings illustrate some of the history and contributions of African Americans in South Carolina.

Contents: Counties in South Carolina with African American Historic Places
Abbeville - Aiken - Allendale Anderson - Bamberg - Barnwell - Beaufort - Berkeley - Calhoun - Charleston - Cherokee - Chester - Chesterfield - Clarendon - Colleton - Darlington - Dillon - Dorchester - Edgefield - Fairfield - Florence - Georgetown - Greenville - Greenwood - Hampton - Horry - Jasper - Kershaw - Lancaster - Laurens - Lee - Lexington - Marion - Marlboro - Newberry - Oconee - Orangeburg - Pickens - Richland - Saluda - Spartanburg - Sumter - Union - Williamsburg - York

== Abbeville County ==
- Abbeville
  - President's House of Harbison College (NR)
  - McGowan-Barksdale Servant Houses (CP)
  - Mulberry A.M.E. Church (HM)
  - St. James A.M.E. Church (CP)
  - Second Presbyterian Church (CP)

== Aiken County ==
- Aiken
  - Aiken Colored Cemetery (NR)
  - Aiken Colored Cemetery/Pine Lawn Memorial Gardens (HM)
  - Aiken Graded School (HM)
  - Immanuel School (NR)
  - Schofield School (HM)
- Bath
  - Jefferson High School/Rev. Austin Jefferson, Sr. (HM)
  - Providence Baptist Church (HM)
- Beech Island
  - Silver Bluff Baptist Church (HM)
- Clearwater
  - Storm Branch Baptist Church (HM)
- Langley
  - Jacksonville School/Jacksonville Lodge (HM)
- North Augusta, South Carolina
  - Carrsville (HM)
  - The Hamburg Massacre (HM)

== Allendale County ==
- Allendale
  - Happy Home Baptist Church (HM)

== Anderson County ==
- Pendleton
  - African American School Site (HM)
  - Faith Cabin Library at Anderson County Training School (NR)
  - “The Hundreds” (HM)

== Bamberg County ==
- Denmark
  - Denmark Industrial School HM
  - Voorhees College Historic District (NR)
  - Voorhees University (HM)

== Barnwell County ==
- Barnewell
  - Bethlehem Baptist Church (HM/NR)
- Blackville
  - Macedonia Baptist Church (HM)

== Beaufort County ==
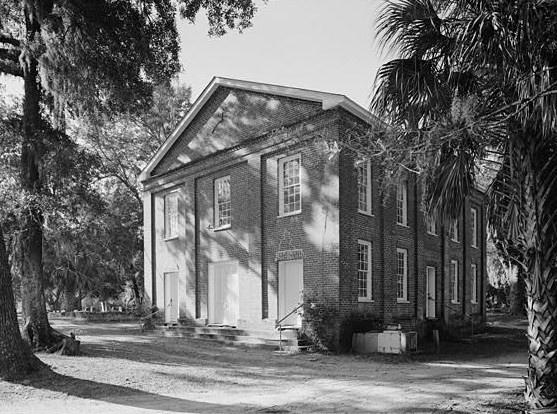
Brick Church at Penn Center

- Beaufort
  - Baptist Church of Beaufort (HM)
  - Beaufort National Cemetery (NR)
  - Berean Church/J.I. Washington Branch Library (HM)
  - Berean Presbyterian Church (CP)
  - Detreville House (CP)
  - First African Baptist Church (CP)
  - Grand Army of the Republic Hall (HM/CP)
  - Mather School (HM)
  - Robert Smalls House (NR/NRL)
  - Sons of Beaufort Lodge No. 36 (CP)
  - Tabernacle Baptist Church (CP)
  - Tabernacle Baptist Church /Robert Smalls (HM)
  - Wesley Methodist Church (HM)
- Bluffton
  - Cyrus Garvin House NR
  - Cyrus Garvin/Cyrus Garvin House HM
  - Michael C. Riley Schools (HM)
- Daufuskie Island
  - Daufuskie Island (HM)
  - Daufuskie Island Historic District (NR)
  - Mary Field School (HM)
- Garden City vicinity
  - Combahee River Raid/Freedom Along the Combahee (HM)
- Hilton Head
  - Cherry Hill School (NR)
  - Fish Hall/Thomas Fenwick Drayton (HM)
  - Fort Howell (HM/NR)
  - Mitchelville (Fish Haul) Archaeological Site (NR)
  - Mitchelville Site (HM)
  - Queen Chapel A.M.E. Church (HM)
  - St. James Baptist Church (HM)
  - Stoney-Baynard Plantation (NR)
- Port Royal
  - Camp Saxton (HM)
  - Emancipation Day/Camp Saxton Site (HM)
- St. Helena Island
  - Emanuel Alston House (NR)
  - Dr. York Bailey House (NR)
  - Coffin Point Plantation (NR)
  - Eddings Point Community Praise House (NR)
  - Frogmore Plantation Complex (NR)
  - Great Sea Island Storm (HR)
  - The Green (NR)
  - Knights of Wise Men Lodge (NR)
  - Mary Jenkins Community Praise House (NR)
  - The Oaks (NR)
  - Penn Center Historic District (NR/NRL)
  - Penn School (HM)
  - Seaside Plantation (NR)
  - Robert Simmons House (NR)
  - The Great Sea Island Storm (HM)
  - William Simmons House (HM)
- Sheldon
  - Sheldon Union Academy/Sheldon School (HM)

== Berkeley County ==
- Cainhoy
  - Cainhoy Historic District (NR)
- Cordesville, South Carolina
  - Cordesville Rosenwald School (HM)
- Goose Creek
  - Casey (Caice) (HM)
  - Howe Hall Plantation (HM)
- Hanahan
  - Bowen's Corner (HM)
- Moncks Corner
  - Berkeley Training High School (HM)
  - Cherry Hill Classroom (HM)
  - Cooper River Historic District (NR)
  - Dixie Training School/Berkeley Training High School (HM)
- St. Stephen
  - St. Stephen's Colored School (HM)

== Calhoun County ==
- Fort Motte
  - Fort Motte Rosenwald School Site (HM)
  - Lang Syne Cemetery (HM)
  - Mount Pleasant Baptist Church (HM)
- Elloree vicinity
  - Good Hope Picnic (HM)
- St. Matthews, South Carolina
  - Bethel A.M.E. Church and School (HM)
  - John Ford High School (HM)
  - Mt. Carmel Baptist Church (HM)
  - Oakland Cemetery (HM))
  - St. John Good Samaritan Lodge Hall and Cemetery (HM)
  - St. Matthews C.T.S. Site (HM)
  - True Blue Cemetery (HM)
  - West End Public Library (HM)

== Charleston County ==
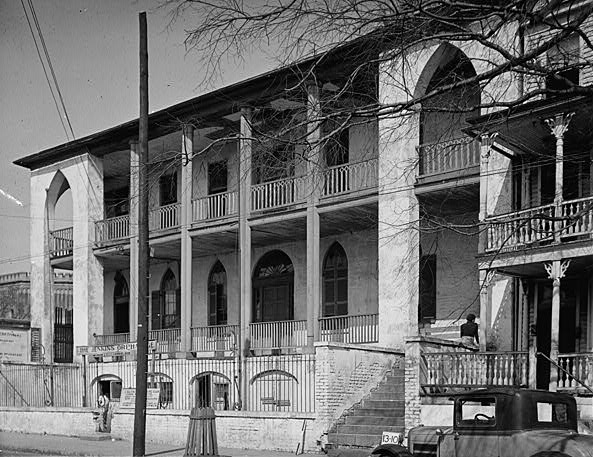
Old Marine Hospital/Jenkin's Orphanage

- Adams Run
  - King Cemetery (NR)
- Charleston
  - Aiken-Rhett House Slave Quarters (CP)
  - Ashley River Historic District (NR)
  - Avery Institute (CP)
  - Burke High School (HM)
  - Calvary Episcopal Church (HM)
  - Centenary United Methodist Church (CP)
  - Central Baptist Church (CP)
  - Charleston Cemeteries Historic District (NR)
  - Cigar Factory/“We Shall Overcome” (HM)
  - Septima Clark Birthplace (HM)
  - Constitutional Convention of 1868 (HM)
  - John L. Dart Library (HM)
  - Denmark Vesey House (NR/NRL)
  - Dianna Brown Antique Shop (NR)
  - Drayton Hall (NR/NRL)
  - Emanuel A.M.E. Church (NR)
  - Faber House (Hametic Hotel) (NR)
  - First Memorial Day (HM)
  - Harleston-Boags Funeral Home (CP)
  - Harmon Field/Cannon Street All-Stars (HM)
  - Richard Holloway Houses (CP)
  - Holy Trinity Reformed Episcopal Church (CP)
  - Jackson Street Freedman’s Cottages (CP)
  - Kress Building/Civil Rights Sit-Ins (HM)
  - Lincoln Theatre/Little Jerusalem (HM)
  - Magnolia Place and Gardens (NR)
  - Mt. Zion A.M.E. Church (NR)
  - Old Bethel United Methodist Church (HM/NR)
  - Old Plymouth Congregational Church (CP)
  - Mt. Zion A.M.E. Church (CP)
  - Old Bethel United Methodist Church (NR)
  - Old Marine Hospital/Jenkins Orphanage (NR)
  - Saint Mark's Episcopal Church (CP)
  - Old Plymouth Congregational Church (CP)
  - Old Slave Mart (NR)
  - The Parsonage/Miss Izard's School (HM)
  - John Schnierle Jr./Alonzo J. Ransier House (CP)
  - Plymouth Church/Plymouth Parsonage (HM)
  - Saint Mark's Episcopal Church (CP)
  - The Seizure of the Planter (HM)
  - James Simons Elementary School/Desegregation of Charleston Schools (HM)
  - Slave Auctions (HM)
  - U.S. Courthouse and Post Office/Briggs v. Elliott (HM)
  - Weston-Grimké Homesite (HM)
  - Jonathan Jasper Wright Law Office (HM)
- Edisto Island
  - Edisto Island Baptist Church (NR)
  - Hutchinson House (NR)
  - Point of Pines Plantation (NR)
  - Seaside School (NR)
- Folly Beach
  - Camp of Wild’s “African Brigade,” 1863-1864 (HM)
  - Folly North Site (NR)
- James Island
  - McLeod Plantation (NR)
  - W. Gresham Meggett High and Elementary School (HM/NR)
  - Simeon Pinckney Homestead (HM)
  - Seashore Farmers' Lodge No. 767 (NR)
- John's Island
  - Moving Star Hall (NR)
  - The Progressive Club (NR)
- Lincolnville, South Carolina
  - Bible Sojourn Society Cemetery (HM)
  - Lincolnville (HM)
  - Lincolnville School/Lincolnville Elementary School (HM)
- Maryville
  - Maryville (HM)
- McClellanville
  - Bethel A.M.E. Church (NR)
- Mount Pleasant
  - Boone Hall Plantation (NR)
  - Friendship A.M.E. Church (HM)
  - Laing School (HM)
  - Mount Pleasant Presbyterian Church (HM)
  - Sweetgrass Baskets (HM)
- North Charleston
  - Inland Rice Fields, ca 1701-1865 (HM)
  - Jenkins Orphanage (HM)
  - Liberty Hill (HM)
  - Union Heights/Howard Heights (HM)
- Rantowles
  - Stono River Slave Rebellion Site (NR/NRL)
  - Stono Rebellion (1739) (HM)
- Sol Legare Island
  - Mosquito Beach (HM)
  - Mosquito Beach Historic District (NR)
- Summerville, South Carolina
  - Ashley River Historic District (NR)

== Cherokee County ==
- Gaffney
  - Dunton Chapel Methodist Church (HM)
  - Granard Graded and High School (HM)
- Pacolet vicinity
  - Mulberry Chapel Methodist Church (HM/NR)

== Chester County ==
- Chester
  - Black Rock Baptist Church/Black Rock School (HM)
  - Brainerd Institute (HM)
  - Kumler Hall (NR)
  - Metropolitan A.M.E. Zion Church (CP)
- Chester, South Carolina|Chester vicinity
  - St. Paul Baptist Church at Halsellville/Carter Colored School (HM)

== Chesterfield County ==
- Cheraw
  - Chesterfield Colored School (HM)
  - Coulter Memorial Academy Site (HM)
  - Dizzy Gillespie Birthplace (HM)
  - Long High School Site (HM)
  - Mount Tabor United Methodist Church (HM/CP)
  - Robert Smalls School (HM/NR)
  - Pee Dee Union Baptist Church (HM)
- Chesterfield
  - Mount Tabor United Methodist Church (CP)

== Clarendon County ==
- Manning
  - Ebenezer Baptist Church (HM)
  - Manning Training School (HM)
  - Pearson Family Homesite/Pearson v. Clarendon Co. (HM)
  - Pleasant Grove School (HM)
  - Trinity A.M.E. Church (HM)
- St. Paul
  - Liberty Hill Church/Pioneers in Desegregation (HM)
- Summerton
  - Briggs Family House/Briggs v. Elliott (HM)
  - Scott’s Branch School/Briggs v. Elliott (HM)
  - St. Mark A.M.E. (HM)
  - Summerton High School (NR)
  - Mt. Zion A.M.E. Church (HM)
  - Taw Caw Church (HM)

== Colleton County, South Carolina ==
- Walterboro
  - Church of Attonement (CP)
  - Colleton Training School/Gruber Street USO Training the Tuskegee Airmen HM
  - St. James the Greater Catholic Mission (NR)
  - St. Peter's A.M.E. Church (HM/CP)
  - Training the Tuskegee Airmen (HM)

== Darlington County ==
- Darlington and vicinity
  - Darlington Memorial Cemetery (HM/NR)
  - Edmund H. Deas House (NR)
  - Edmund H. Deas (HM)
  - Henry "Dad" Brown (HM)
  - Lawrence Reese (1864–1915) (HM)
  - Macedonia Church (HM)
  - Round O (HM)
  - Round O Baptist Church (HM)
  - St. James Church (HM)
  - South Carolina Western Railway Station (NR)
  - St. James Church (HM)
  - West Broad Street Historic District (NR)
- Dovesville
  - Mt. Zion Baptist Church (HM)
- Hartsville and vicinity
  - Butler School (HM)
  - Hartsville Colored Cemetery (HM)
  - Hartsville Graded School/Mt. Pisgah Nursery School (HM)
  - Hough’s Hotel (HM)
  - Jerusalem Baptist Church (HM)
  - New Hopewell Baptist Church (HM)
  - Primus Park (HM)
- Lamar
  - John Wesley Methodist Church (HM)
- Society Hill
  - Lawrence Faulkner (HM)
  - Mt. Rona Missionary Baptist Church (HM)
  - Rosenwald Consolidated School/Rosenwald High School (HM)
  - St. Joseph’s Catholic Church (HM)
  - Zachariah W. Wines (HM)

== Dillon County ==
- Bingham
  - Selkirk Farm (NR)
- Latta
  - Pine Hill A.M.E. Church/Pine Hill Rosenwald School (HM)

== Dorchester County ==
- Harleyville vicinity
  - St. Paul Camp Ground (HM/NR)
- St. George and vicinity
  - St. George Rosenwald School (NR)
  - Shady Grove Camp Ground (HM)
- Summerville and vicinity
  - Alston Graded School/Alston High School (HM)
  - Middleton Place (NR/NRL)

== Edgefield County ==
- Edgefield
  - ** Macedonia Baptist Church/Edgefield Academy (HM)
- Johnston
  - Mt. Pleasant Baptist Church (HM)
- Trenton and vicinity
  - Bettis Academy and Junior College (NR)
  - Bettis Academy (HM)
  - Mt. Canaan Baptist Church (HM)

== Fairfield County ==
- Ridgeway
  - Camp Welfare (HM/NR)
  - Fairfield Institute (HM)
  - St. Paul Baptist Church (HM)

== Florence County ==
- Effingham
  - The Assassination of Rep. Alfred Rush (HM)
- Florence and vicinity
  - Civil Rights Sit-Ins (HM)
  - Ebony Guest House (NR)
  - Historic Downtown African American Business District (HM)
  - Jamestown Historic District (CP)
  - William H. Johnson Birthplace (HM)
  - Roseville Plantation Slave and Freedman's Cemetery (HM)
  - Trinity Baptist Church (HM)
- Lake City
  - Greater St. James A.M.E. Church (HM)
  - The Lynching of Frazier Baker (HM)
  - Joshua Braveboy Plantation (HM)
  - Wilson School/Wilson High School (HM)
- Mars Bluff vicinity
  - Gregg-Wallace Farm Tenant House (HM/NR)
  - Hewn-Timber Cabins (HM)
  - Jamestown (HM)
  - Mt. Zion Methodist Church (HM)
  - Mt. Zion Rosenwald School (HM/NR)
  - Salem United Methodist Church (HM)
  - Slave Houses, Gregg Plantation (NR)

== Georgetown County ==
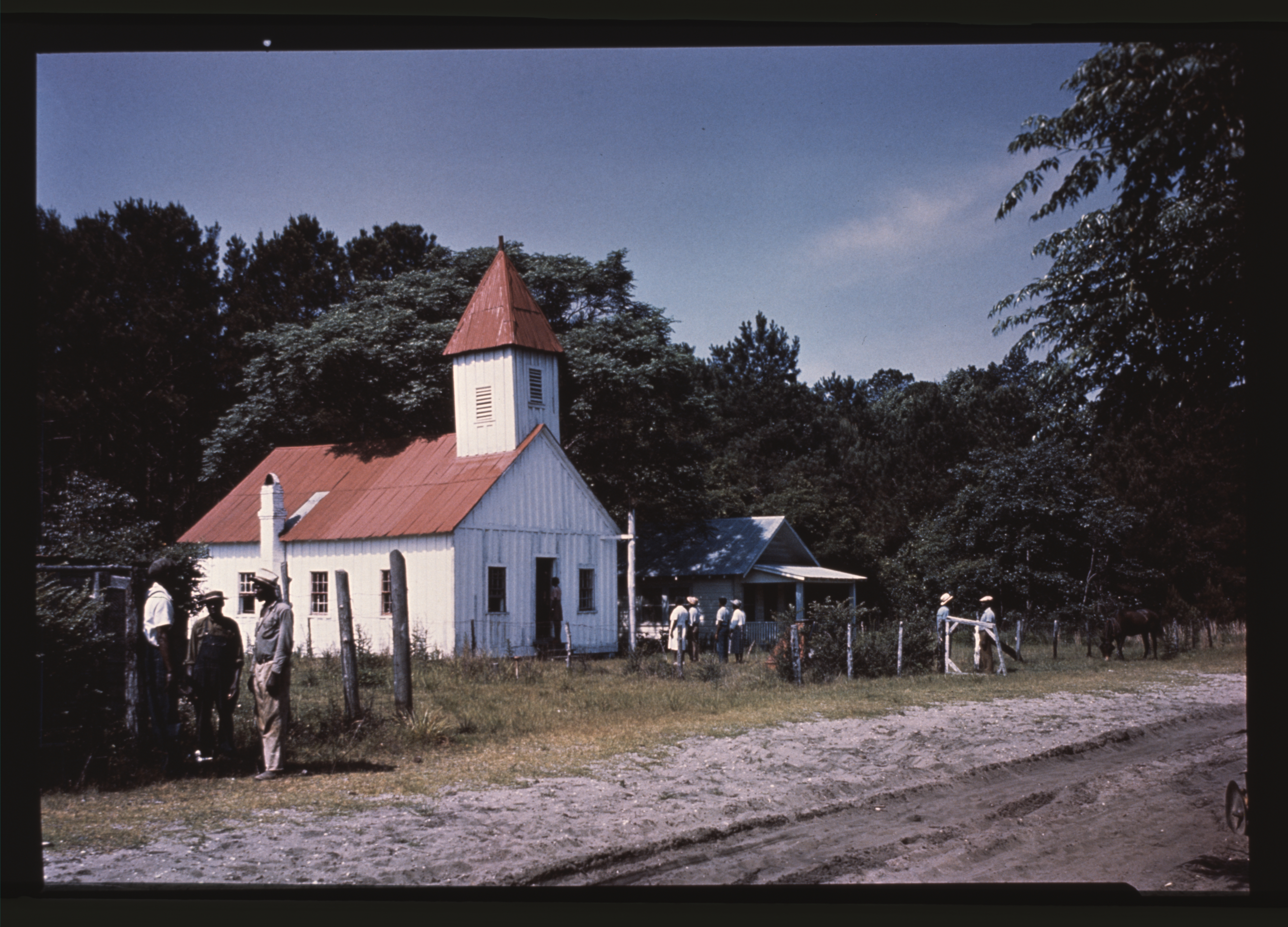
Friendfield Church at Hobcaw Barony

- Rural Georgetown County:
  - Arundel Plantation Slave House (CP)
  - Keithfield Plantation (NR)
  - Pee Dee River Rice Planters Historic District (NR)
- Georgetown and vicinity
  - Jonathan A. Baxter House (CP)
  - Bethel A.M.E. Church (HM/CP)
  - Bethesda Baptist Church (HM)
  - James A. Bowley House (HM/CP)
  - Fannie Carolina House (CP)
  - Friendfield Plantation (NR)
  - Friendly Aid Society/Rosemont School (HM)
  - Hobcaw Barony (NR)
  - Howard School (HM)
  - Mansfield Plantation Slave Street (NR)
  - Mt. Olive Baptist Church (HM)
  - Joseph H. Rainey House (HM/NR/NHL)
  - Hobcaw Barony (NR)
- Murrells Inlet vicinity
  - Richmond Hill Plantation Archeological Sites (NR)
- Pawley's Island
  - Cedar Grove Plantation Chapel (NR)
  - St. John A.M.E. Church (HM)
- Sandy Island
  - Sandy Island School (NR)

== Greenville County ==
- Belton vicinity
  - Holly Springs School (NR)
- Fountain Inn
  - Bryson High School (HM)
  - Fountain Inn Principal’s House and Teacherage (NR)
  - Fountain Inn Rosenwald School (HM)
- Greenville
  - Allen Temple A.M.E. Church (NR)
  - Brutontown (HM)
  - Claussen Bakery (HM)
  - John Wesley Methodist Episcopal Church (NR)
  - Greenville County Courthouse/Willie Earle Lynching Trial (HM)
  - Matoon Presbyterian Church (CP)
  - Little Texas (HM)
  - Matoon Presbyterian Church (CP)
  - Richland Cemetery (NR)
  - Sterling High School (HM)
  - Working Benevolent Society Hospital (HM)
  - Working Benevolent Temple and Professional Building (NR)
  - Sterling High School (HM)
- Simpsonville
  - Cedar Grove Baptist Church /Simpsonville Rosenwald (HM)
  - Old Pilgrim Baptist Church/Old Pilgrim Rosenwald School (HM)
  - Old Pilgrim Baptist Church Cemetery and Kilgore Family Cemetery (NR)

== Greenwood County ==
- Greenwood
  - Benjamin E. Mays Birthplace (HM)
  - Mt. Pisgah A.M.E. Church (NR)
- Hodges
  - Good Hope Baptist Church (HM)
- Kirksey
  - Trapp and Chandler Pottery Site (NR)
- Mays Crossroads
  - Dr. Benjamin E. Mays (HM)
- Ninety Six vicinity
  - Ninety Six Colored School (HM)

== Hampton County ==
- Hampton
  - Cherry Grove Christian Church (HM)
  - Hampton Colored School (HM/NR)
  - Huspah Baptist Church and School (HM)
- Gifford
  - Gifford Rosenwald School (HM)
- Varnville vicinity
  - Steele Missionary School/Zion Fair Colored School (HM)
- Yemassee
  - Yemassee Rosenwald School/Fennell Elementary School (HM)

== Horry County ==
- Atlantic Beach
  - Atlantic Beach (HM)
- Aynor
  - Levister Elementary School (HM)
- Burgess
  - St. James Rosenwald School (HM)
- Conway
  - True Vine Missionary Baptist Church (HM)
  - Whittemore School/Whittemore High School (HM)
- Little River
  - Chestnut Consolidated School/Chestnut Consolidated High School (HM)
- Loris
  - Loris Training School (HM)
- Myrtle Beach
  - Charlie’s Place (HM)
  - Myrtle Beach Colored School (HM)
- Surfside Beach
  - Ark Cemetery (HM)

== Jasper County ==
- Ridgeland
  - Clementa Carlos Pinckney (HM)
  - Honey Hill/Boyd's Neck Battlefield (NR)
- Tillman
  - St. Matthew Baptist Church (HM)

== Kershaw County ==
- Camden
  - Monroe Boykin Park (HM)
  - Bonds Conway House (CP)
  - E.H. Dibble Store/Eugene H. Dibble (HM)
  - Thomas English House (NR)
  - Mather Academy (HM)
  - Red Hill School (HM)
- Lugoff
  - Ephesus United Methodist Church (HM)

== Lancaster County ==
- Cauthen Crossroads
  - Mt. Carmel A.M.E. Zion Church and Campground (NR)
  - Mt. Carmel Campground (HM)
- Kershaw
  - Clinton AME Zion Church (NR)
  - Unity Baptist Church (NR)
- Lancaster
  - Clinton Memorial Cemetery/Isom C. Clinton (HM)
  - Lancaster Normal and Industrial Institute (HM)

== Laurens County ==
- Gray Court
  - Laurens County Training School (HM)
  - Mt. Carmel A.M.E. Church (HM)
- Laurens
  - Bell Street School/Martha Dendy School ('HM)
  - Bethel A.M.E. Church (NR)
  - Friendship A.M.E. Church & Cemetery/Bell Street Schools (HM)
  - Bethel A.M.E. Church (CP)
  - Charles H. Duckett House (NR)
  - Rich Hill (HM)
  - Saint Paul First Baptist Church (CP)

== Lee County ==
- Bishopville
  - Dennis High School (HM/NR)
- Elliot
  - Mount Pleasant High School (HM)

== Lexington County ==
- Batesburg-Leesville
  - Blinding of Isaac Woodard (HM)
- Cayce
  - Congaree Creek Earthworks (HM)
- West Columbia
  - Lakeview School (HM)
  - Saluda Factory Historic District (NR)
  - Saluda Factory (HM)

== Marion County ==
- Ariel Crossroads
  - St. James A.M.E. Church (HM)
- Centenary
  - Centenary Rosenwald School/Terrell’s Bay High School (HM)
- Marion
  - Taylor's Barber Shop (CP)
- Mullins
  - Mt. Olive Baptist Church (HM/CP)
  - Palmetto High School (HM)

== Marlboro County ==
- Adamsville Crossroads
  - Adamsville School (HM)
- Bennettsville
  - St. Michael's Methodist Church (CP)
  - “The Gulf” (HM)
  - Marlboro Training High School (HM)
- Monroe Crossroads
  - Great Pee Dee Presbyterian Church/Pee Dee Missionary Baptist Church HM

== Newberry County ==
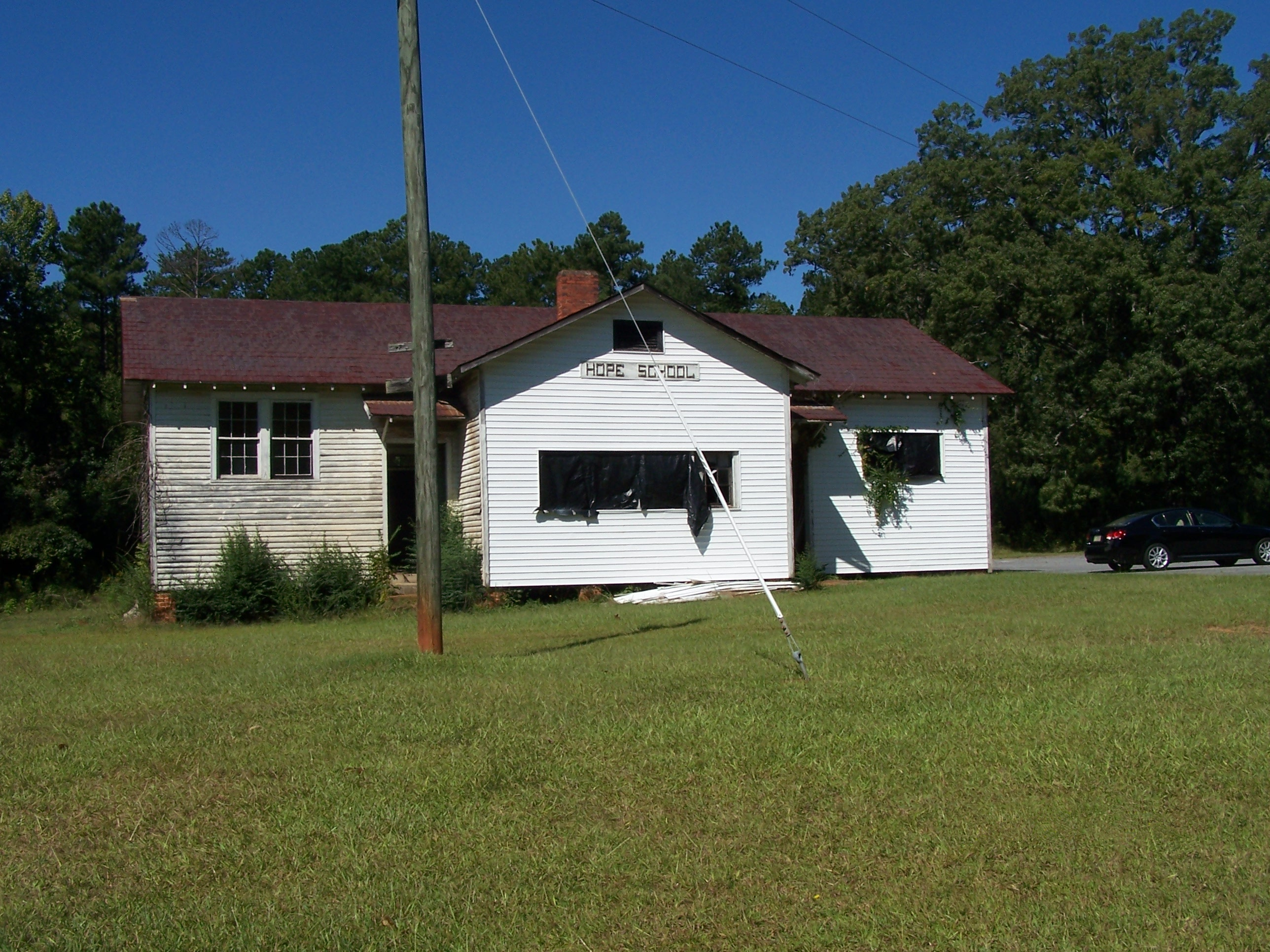
Hope Rosenwald School

- Newberry
  - Hannah Rosenwald School (NR)
  - Miller Chapel A.M.E. Church (HM)
  - Peoples Hospital (HM)
- Prosperity and vicinity
  - Howard Junior High School (NR)
  - Jacob Bedenbaugh House (NR)
- Pomaria
  - Hope Rosenwald School (HM/NR)

== Oconee County ==
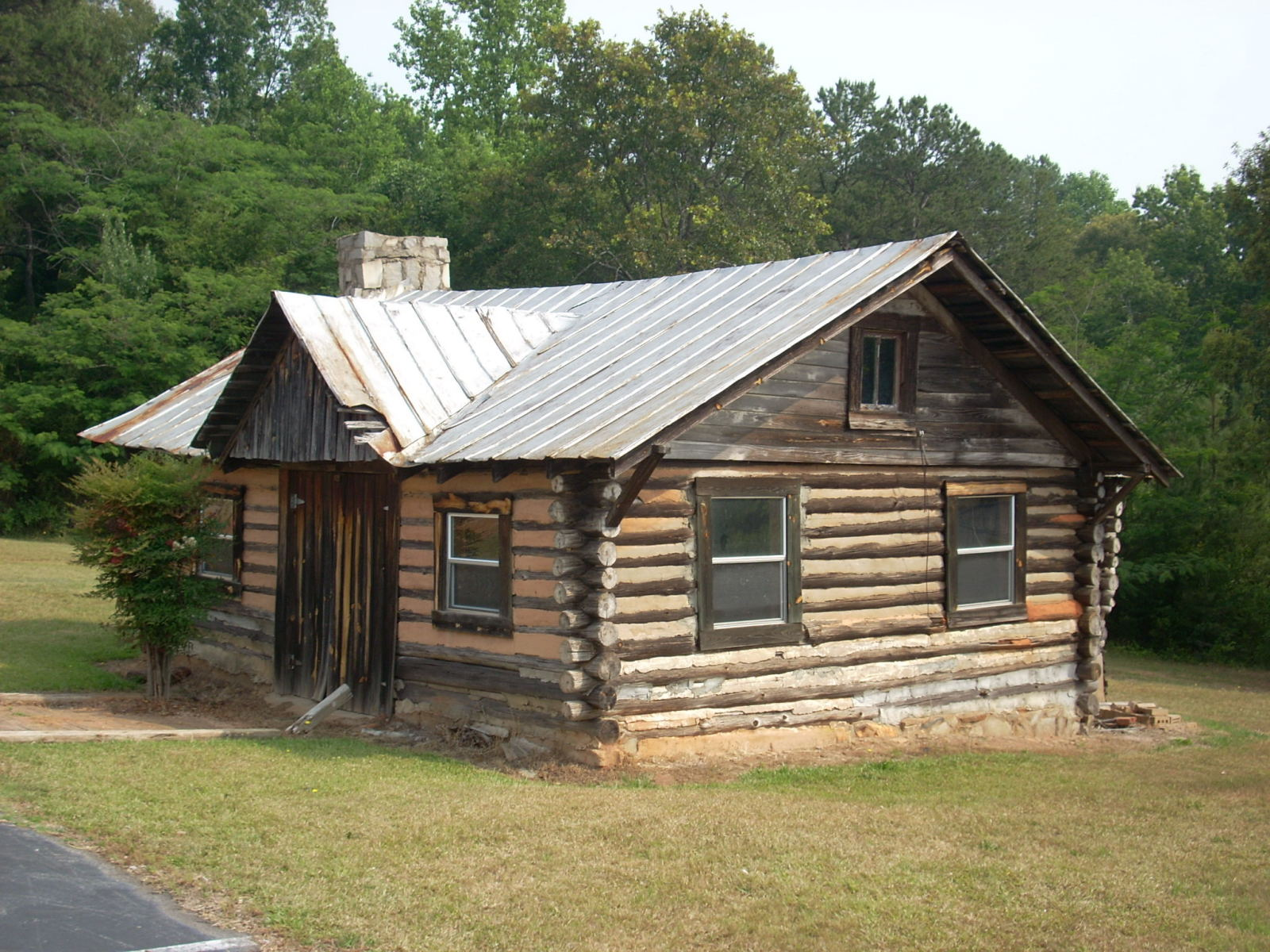
Library of Seneca Institute - Seneca Junior High

- Seneca
  - Faith Cabin Library at Seneca Junior College (NR)
  - Oconee County Training School (HM)
  - Seneca Institute (HM)
- Westminster
  - Bethel Colored Methodist/Episcopal Church (HM)
  - Retreat Rosenwald School (NR)

== Orangeburg County ==
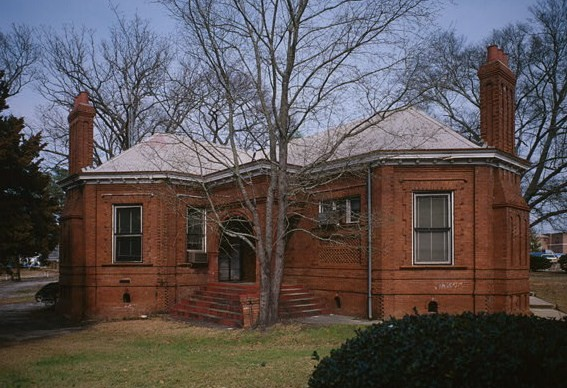
Lee Library at Claflin College

- Bowman
  - Bowman Rosenwald School (HM)
- Elloree, South Carolina and vicinity
  - Camp Harry E. Daniels (HM)
  - Shiloh A.M.E. Church (HM)
- Holly Hill
  - Holly Hill Rosenwald School (HM)
  - McCoy Farmstead (NR)
- Norway
  - Bushy Pond Baptist Church (HM)
- Neeses vicinity
  - Rocky Swamp Rosenwald School (HM)
- Orangeburg
  - All Star Bowling Lanes (NR)
  - Civil Rights Meetings/Sit-In March (HM)
  - Claflin College Historic District (NR)
  - Claflin College (HM)
  - Dukes Gymnasium (NR)
  - East Russell Street Area Historic District (NR)
  - Felton Training School & Teacherage (HM)
  - Fisher's Rexall Drugs (CP)
  - Major John Hammond Fordham House (NR)
  - Hodge Hall (NR)
  - Kress Building (NR)
  - Law Offices of Coblyn and Townsend (CP)
  - Lowman Hall (NR)
  - Mt. Pisgah Baptist Church (NR)
  - Orangeburg City Cemetery (NR)
  - Orangeburg Downtown Historic District NR
  - The Orangeburg Massacre (HM)
  - South Carolina State College Historic District (NR)
  - South Carolina State University (HM)
  - St. Paul’s Episcopal Church (HM)
  - John Benjamin Taylor House (HM)
  - Tingley Memorial Hall, Claflin College (NR)
  - Treadwell Street Historic District (NR)
  - Trinity Methodist Episcopal Church (HM/NR)
  - Wilkinson High School (Belleville campus) (HM)
  - Wilkinson High School (Goff campus) (HM)
  - Williams Chapel A.M.E. Church (HM/NR)
- Orangeburg vicinity
  - Great Branch Teacherage (NR)
  - Great Branch School and Teacherage (HM)
  - Mattie E. Pegues New Homemakers Camp (HM)
  - Pewilburwhitcade New Farmers Camp (HM)

== Pickens County ==
- Clemson
  - Fort Hill Slave and Convict Cemetery/Woodland Cemetery Clemson University (HM)
  - Fort Hill Slave Quarters/Clemson College Convict Stockade (HM)
  - Integration with Dignity (HM)
- Liberty
  - Liberty Colored High School (NR)

== Richland County ==
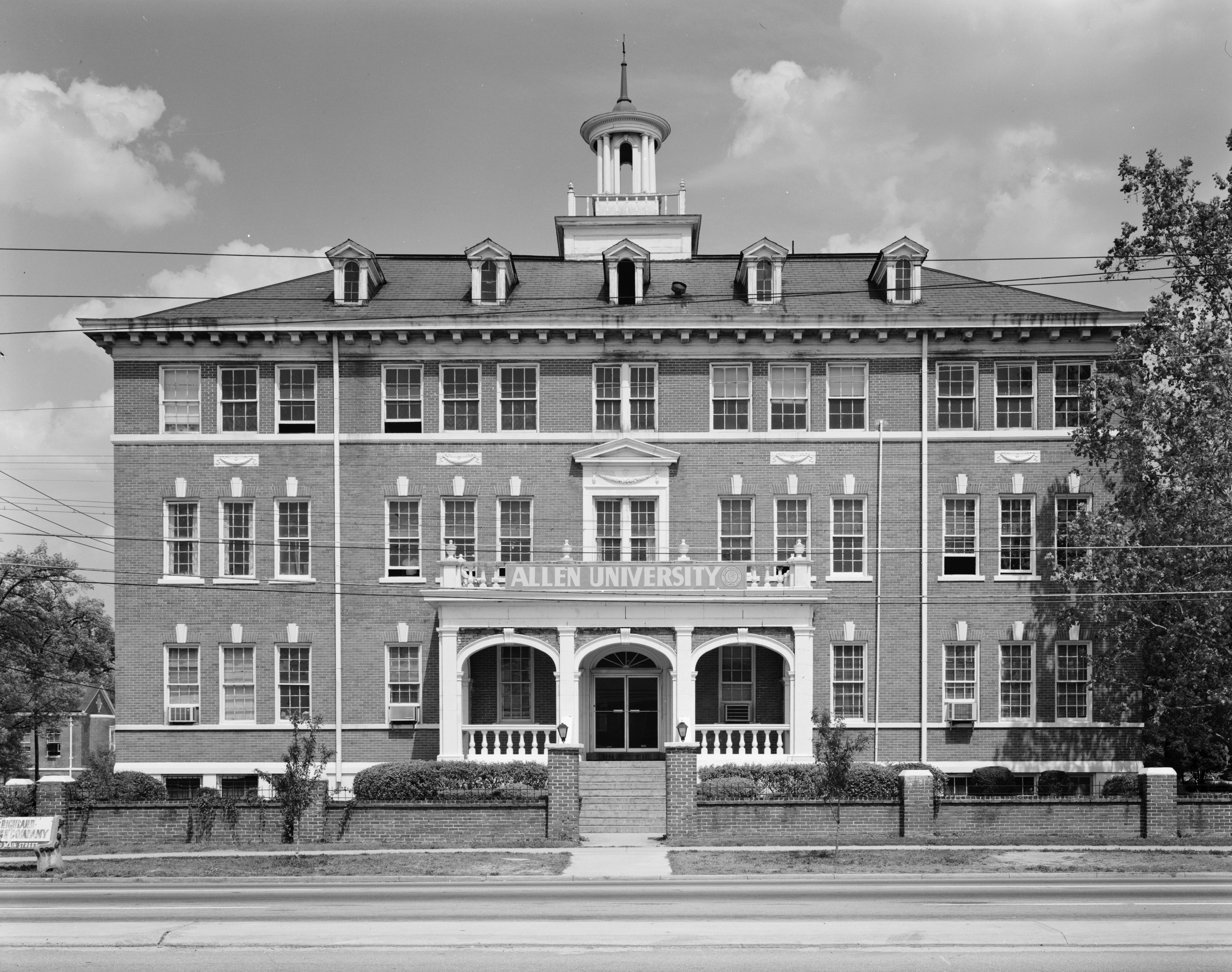
Chapelle Administration Building at Allen University

- Blythewood
  - Bethel Baptist Church (HM)
  - Little Zion Baptist Church (HM)
- Columbia
  - 1900 Block Henderson Street/William J. Sumter (HM)
  - Allen University (HM)
  - Allen University Historic District (HM/NR)
  - Alston House (HM/NR)
  - Benedict College (HM)
  - Benedict College Historic District (NR/HM)
  - Bethel A.M.E. Church (HM/NR)
  - Bible Way Church of Atlas Road (HM)
  - Big Apple/House of Peace Synagogue (NR)
  - Blossom Street School (HM)
  - Booker T. Washington High School Auditorium (NR)
  - Booker T. Washington School/Booker T. Washington High (HM)
  - Calvary Baptist Church, 1865-1945 (HM)
  - Canal Dime Savings Bank/Bouie v. City of Columbia (1964) (HM)
  - Carver Theatre (HM/NR)
  - Chappelle Administration Building (NR/NHL)
  - Champion & Pearson Funeral Home (NR)
  - Columbia Civil Rights Sit-Ins/Barr v. City of Columbia (1964) HM
  - Columbia Township Auditorium (NR)
  - Cyril O Spann Medical Office (HM/NR)
  - Harriet M. Cornwell Tourist House (HM/NR)
  - Howard School Site (HM)
  - Edwards v. S.C. (HM)
  - Dr. Matilda A. Evans House (HM/HM)
  - Fair-Rutherford and Rutherford Houses (NR)
  - First Calvary Baptist Church (HM)
  - Florence Benson Elementary (NR)
  - Fort Jackson Elementary School/Hood Street Elementary School (HM)
  - Nathaniel J. Frederick House (HM)
  - Good Samaritan-Waverly Hospital (HM/NR)
  - Harden Street Substation (NR)
  - Heidt-Russell House (HM)
  - James M. Hinton House (HM)
  - Howard School Site (HM)
  - Kress Building (NR)
  - Ladson Presbyterian Church (HM/NR)
  - Leevy’s Funeral Home (NR)
  - Lighthouse & Informer (HM)
  - Robert Weston Mance House (HM)
  - Manigault’s Funeral Home/Congaree Casket Company (HM)
  - Mann-Simons Cottage (HM/NR)
  - Minton Family Home/Dr. Henry McKee Minton (HM)
  - Modjeska Monteith Simkins House (HM/NR)
  - Monteith School (HM)
  - North Carolina Mutual Building (HM/NR)
  - Matthew J. Perry House (HM)
  - I. DeQuincey Newman House (HM)
  - Palmetto Education Association (HM)
  - Pine Grove Rosenwald School (HM/NR)
  - Randolph Cemetery (HM/NR)
  - Richard Samuel Roberts House (HM)
  - Ruth’s Beauty Parlor (CP)
  - Sidney Park C.M.E. Church (HM/NR)
  - St. Luke’s Episcopal Church (HM)
  - St. Paul Church (HM)
  - St. Paul Church/Oak Grove (HM)
  - South Carolina Statehouse (NR)
  - Victory Savings Bank (HM)
  - Visanka Starks House (HM)
  - Waverly Historic District (HM/NR)
  - Wesley Methodist Church (HM/CP)
  - A.P. Williams Funeral Home (NR)
  - Zion Baptist Church (HM)
  - Zion Chapel Baptist Church No. 1 (HM)
- Eastover and vicinity
  - Goodwill Plantation (NR)
- Hopkins
  - New Light Beulah Baptist Church (HM)
  - St. Phillip A.M.E. Church (HM)
  - St. Phillip School (NR)
  - Kensington (HM)
  - Siloam School (NR)
  - St. Phillip School (NR)
  - St. Thomas Protestant Episcopal Church (NR)
  - Wesley Methodist Church (HM)
- Gadsden
  - Magnolia, Slave House (NR)
- Hopkins
  - Barber House ((Harriet Barber House) NR/HM)

== Saluda County ==
- Ridge Springs
  - Ridge Hill High School (NR)
  - Ridge Hill School/Faith Cabin Library (HM)
- Saluda
  - Faith Cabin Library Site (HM)

== Spartanburg County ==
- Pacolet and vicinity
  - Marysville School (NR)
  - Little Africa (HM)
- Spartanburg
  - 15th N.Y. Infantry/“Harlem Hell Fighters” (HM)
  - Episcopal Church of the Epiphany (HM)
  - Mary H. Wright Elementary School (NR)
  - Old City Cemetery (HM)

== Sumter County ==
- Mayesville
  - Birthplace of Mary McLeod Bethune (HM)
  - Goodwill Parochial School (NR)
- Stateburg
  - Ellison House (CP)
- Sumter
  - Beulah School (HM)
  - Kendall Institute (HM)
  - Enon Baptist Church (HM)
  - Mt. Zion Methodist Church (HM)
  - St. Paul African Methodist Episcopal Church (HM)
- Sumter vicinity
  - Henry J. Maxwell (HM)

== Union County ==
- Union
  - Clinton Chapel AME Zion Church (NR)
  - Corinth Baptist Church (NR)
  - Sims High School (HM)
  - Union Community Hospital (HM/NR)
  - Union County Lynchings of 1871 (HM)

== Williamsburg County ==
- Bloomingvale
  - Mt. Zion A.M.E. Church (HM)
- Cades
  - Cooper’s Academy/Bethesda Methodist Church (HM)
- Greeleyville
  - McCollum-Murray House (HM/NR)
- Kingstree and vicinity
  - Benevolent Societies Hospital (HM)
  - Epps-McGill Farmhouse (NR)
  - “Let Us March on Ballot Boxes” (HM)
  - Stephen A. Swails House (HM)
  - Tomlinson School (HM)
- Salters
  - Bethel African Methodist Episcopal Church (HM)
- Spring Gully
  - Chubby Checker Home (HM)

== York County ==
- Catawba
  - Catawba Rosenwald (NR)
  - Liberty Hill School (HM)
- Fort Mill
  - George Fish School (HM
- Hickory Grove
  - St. James Rosenwald School (HM)
- Newport and vicinity
  - William Hill (HM)
  - William Hill/Hill’s Ironworks (HM)
- McConnells vicinity
  - Brick House / Lynching of Jim Williams (HM)
- Rock Hill and vicinity
  - Afro American Insurance Company (HM)
  - Afro-American Insurance Company Building (NR)
  - Boyd Hill School/West End School (HM)
  - Carroll Rosenwald School (NR)
  - Clinton Junior College (HM)
  - Elias Hill Homeplace/Liberian Migration (HM)
  - Emmett Scott School/Friendship Junior College (HM)
  - Hermon Presbyterian Church (NR)
  - McCrory’s Civil Rights Sit-Ins/“Friendship Nine” (HM)
  - Mount Prospect Baptist Church (HM)
  - New Mount Olivet A.M.E. Zion Church (HM)
  - St. Anne’s Parochial School (HM)
- Sharon
  - Blue Branch Church (HM)
- York
  - Allison Creek Presbyterian Church/African-American Graveyard (HM)
  - Sadler Store (HM/NR)
  - Wright Funeral Home (HM)

== See also ==
African Americans in South Carolina
