= Africatown (disambiguation) =

Africatown or Little Africa may refer to:

- Africatown in Mobile, Alabama, generally referred to as "Africatown USA"
- Africatown Seattle, various organizations in the Central District of the U.S. city of Seattle
- Africville, in Halifax, Nova Scotia, Canada.
- Greenwood District, Tulsa, variously known as "Africa Town", "Negro Wall Street", and "Black Wall Street" until the Tulsa race massacre of 1921
- Kavir National Park in Iran is sometimes known as "Little Africa"
- Little Africa, South Carolina
- Little Africa, an area, the centre of which is Pedra do Sal, Saúde, Rio de Janeiro, Brazil
- Little Africa, in New York City a historic name for several neighborhoods:

- "Stagg Town" in Five Points, Manhattan (early 19th century)
- Little Africa, Manhattan in Greenwich Village (later 19th - early 20th century)
- Sandy Ground in Staten Island

- Watthana District, Bangkok, Thailand
- Yuexiu District, Guangzhou, China

== See also ==
- African-American neighborhood, in the United States of America
- Africville, neighbourhood in Halifax, Nova Scotia, Canada
- Goutte d'Or, a neighborhood in Paris that has a large numbers of North African residents, known as "Little Africa"
