= McLeod Plantation =

Historic house in South Carolina, United States

- U.S. National Register of Historic Places
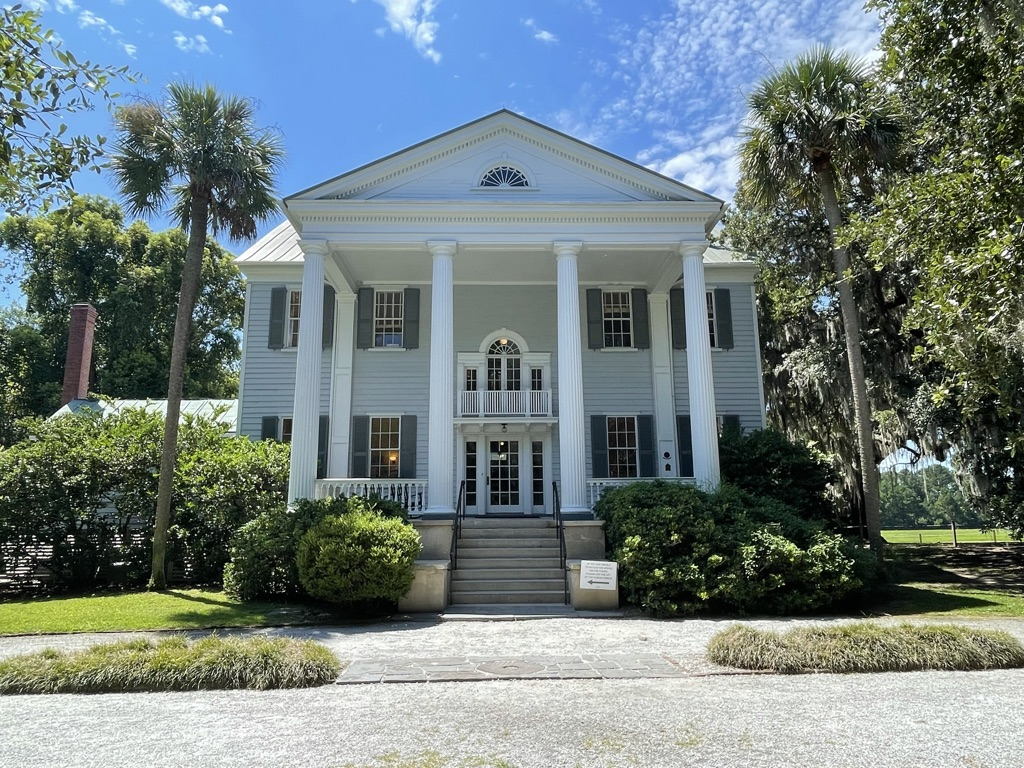
- McLeod Plantation in 2022
- Location: 325 Country Club Dr., Charleston, South Carolina
- Nearest city: Charleston, South Carolina
- Coordinates: 32°45′46″N 79°58′20.5″W
- Area: 9.2 acres (3.7 ha)
- Built: 1854
- Architectural style: Georgian
- NRHP reference No.: 74001831
- Added to NRHP: August 13, 1974

McLeod Plantation is a former Sea Island cotton plantation located on James Island, South Carolina, near the intersection of Folly and Maybank roads at Wappoo Creek, which flows into the Ashley River. The plantation is considered an important Gullah Geechee heritage site, preserved in recognition of its cultural and historical significance to African-American and European-American cultures.

== History ==
The site was first recorded on maps from 1678 under the name "Morris."

In 1780 in the American War of Independence, British General Sir Henry Clinton used the original house as his headquarters while planning the siege of Charleston. Many enslaved workers joined the British lines seeking freedom and were evacuated from the city.

The plantation house standing on the land today was constructed by free and/or enslaved craftsmen between 1854-1857. Also on the property are five remaining clapboard enslaved dwellings, a detached kitchen, a dairy building, a pre-Civil War gin house for the long-staple cotton grown on the Sea Islands, a barn, and a carriage house.

The plantation was occupied by Confederate forces during most of the Civil War, and the Big House served as a hospital. After the evacuation of Charleston in early 1865, the site was occupied by the 55th Massachusetts Volunteer Regiments, African American soldiers of the US Colored Troops. Later, the home was occupied as offices by the Freedmen's Bureau. At one point, newly freed enslaved people camped out on the plantation's lands.

In 1926, William Ellis McLeod directed renovations to the house, changing what was designated as the front and rear, and altering the front facade.

The home was occupied by the McLeod family until 1990. A share was given to the Historic Charleston Foundation, which proceeded to consolidate shareholders. In 1993, ten acres were designated for the growing of sweetgrass to help ensure a supply of the basic component used in crafting sweetgrass baskets, a product of the creole Gullah Geechee culture of African Americans.

In 2004, the plantation was sold to the American College of the Building Arts. Unable to support both the development of its school and the site, ACBA returned it to Historic Charleston in 2008.

== McLeod Plantation Historic Site ==
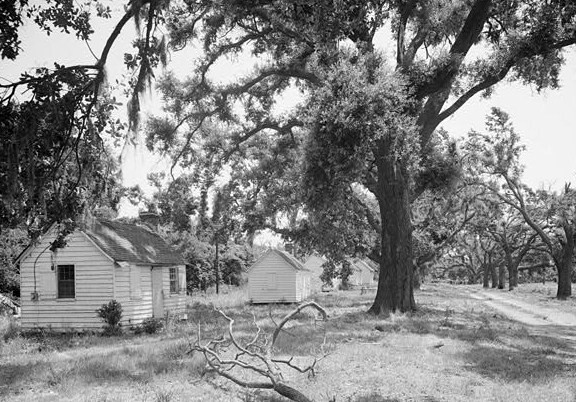
Slave Quarters at McCleod Plantation

In 2011, Historic Charleston Foundation sold McLeod Plantation to the Charleston County Park and Recreation Commission, thereby ensuring the buildings would be preserved and protected under public ownership. The McLeod Plantation Historic Site opened to the public on April 25, 2015.

The site is designated as part of the federally recognized Gullah Geechee Cultural Heritage Corridor in South Carolina. The corridor stretches along the coast from Wilmington, North Carolina, to Jacksonville, Florida, encompassing the Lowcountry and Sea Islands, with South Carolina representing most of the area. Enslaved people who survived the Middle Passage, were imported here mostly from West and Central Africa. They were forced to labor on rice, indigo and cotton plantations such as McLeod. From various ethnic and cultural groups, these men, women, and children developed the creolized Gullah Geechee culture and language, which has many African retentions.

It was also named one of the African American Historic Places in South Carolina.
