= James R. Rosemond =

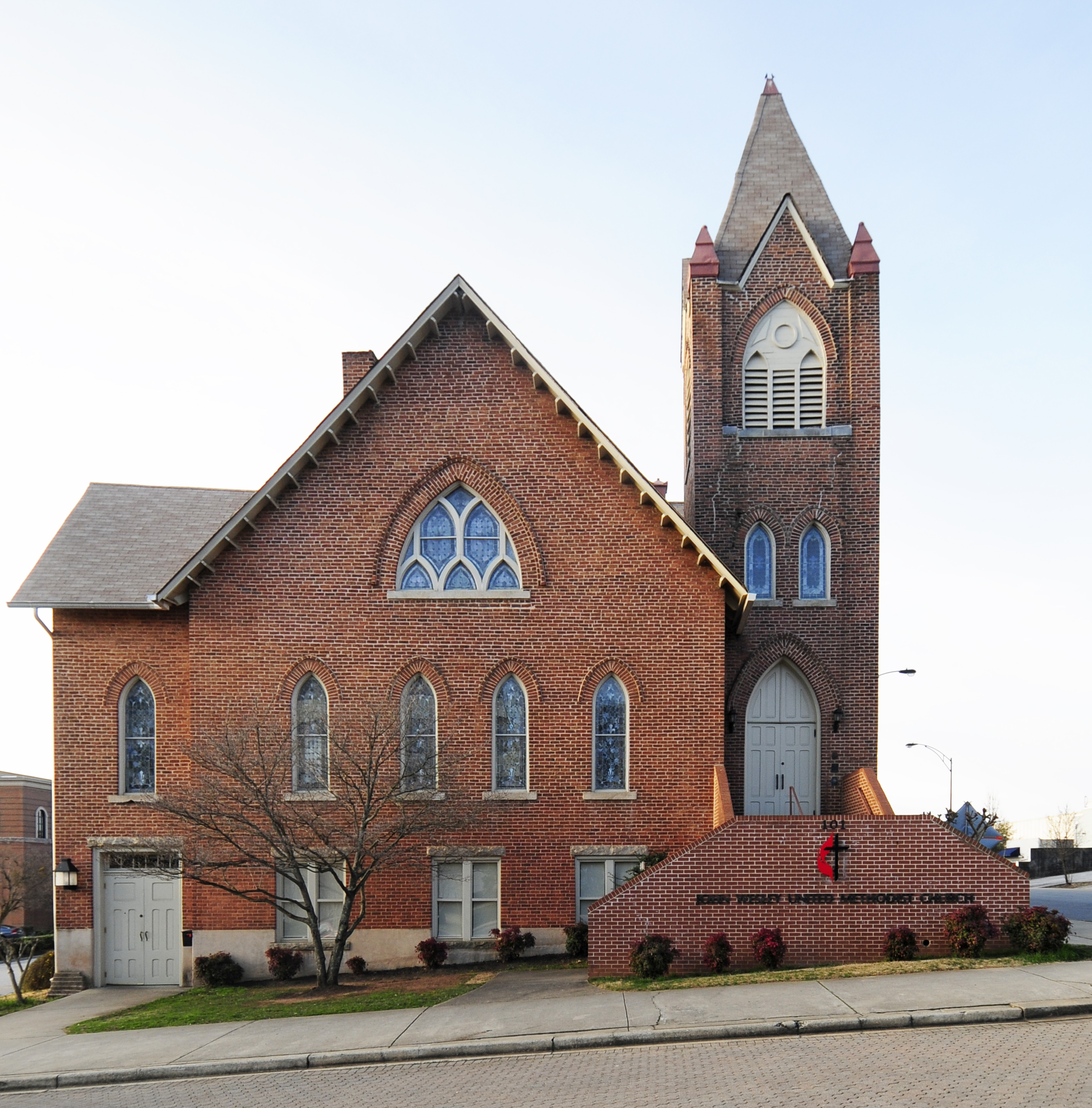
The John Wesley Methodist Episcopal Church in Greenville, founded by James R. Rosemond

James R. Rosemond (Jim McBee; 1 February 1820 – 1902) was an American Methodist Episcopal preacher who was a former slave. He was born in Greenville, South Carolina to Abraham and Peggy, and was eventually sold to entrepreneur Vardry McBee. Rosemond was baptized in 1844. He became a leader in the local Methodist Episcopal, South church, and was licensed to preach on September 12, 1854.

Rosemond was emancipated after the American Civil War. As part of the Methodist Episcopal post-war outreach, he organized 50 churches for Black communities in the South, including the John Wesley Methodist Episcopal Church in Greenville in 1866. In 1867, he attended the Baker Theological Institute and was ordained a deacon. In 1868, he was ordained an elder. He died in 1902 and is buried in St. Matthew Church.
