= Orangeburg Downtown Historic District =

Historic district in South Carolina, United States

- U.S. National Register of Historic Places
- U.S. Historic district
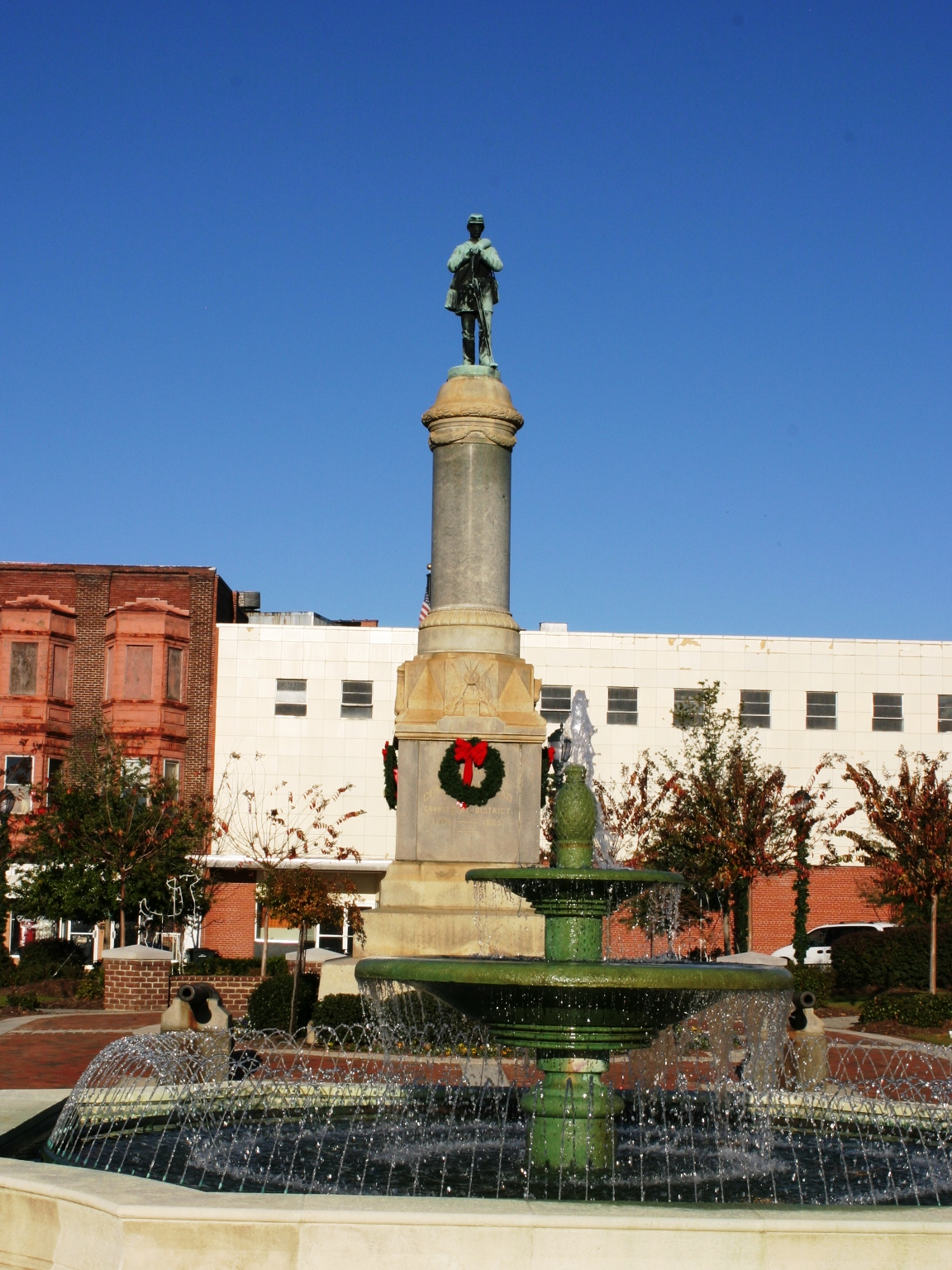
- Confederate Memorial, Orangeburg Downtown Historic District, November 2006

- Location within South Carolina Location within the United States
- Location: Russell, Broughton, Middleton, Church, Meeting, St. John, Hampton, and Amelia Sts. around public square, Orangeburg, South Carolina
- Coordinates: 33°29′24″N 80°51′49″W
- Area: 25 acres (10 ha)
- Architect: Multiple
- Architectural style: Romanesque
- MPS: Orangeburg MRA
- NRHP reference No.: 85002317
- Added to NRHP: September 20, 1985

Orangeburg Downtown Historic District is a national historic district located at Orangeburg, Orangeburg County, South Carolina. The district encompasses 44 contributing buildings in the central business district of Orangeburg. It includes a variety of commercial, industrial, and governmental buildings built between about 1883 and 1925. Notable buildings include St. Paul's Methodist Church, U. S. Post Office, Blythewood Building, Orangeburg City Hall, and Fire Department Headquarters.

It was added to the National Register of Historic Places in 1985.

Additional documentation for the historic district was approved by the National Register on January 22, 2019.
