= Working Benevolent Temple and Professional Building =

- U.S. National Register of Historic Places
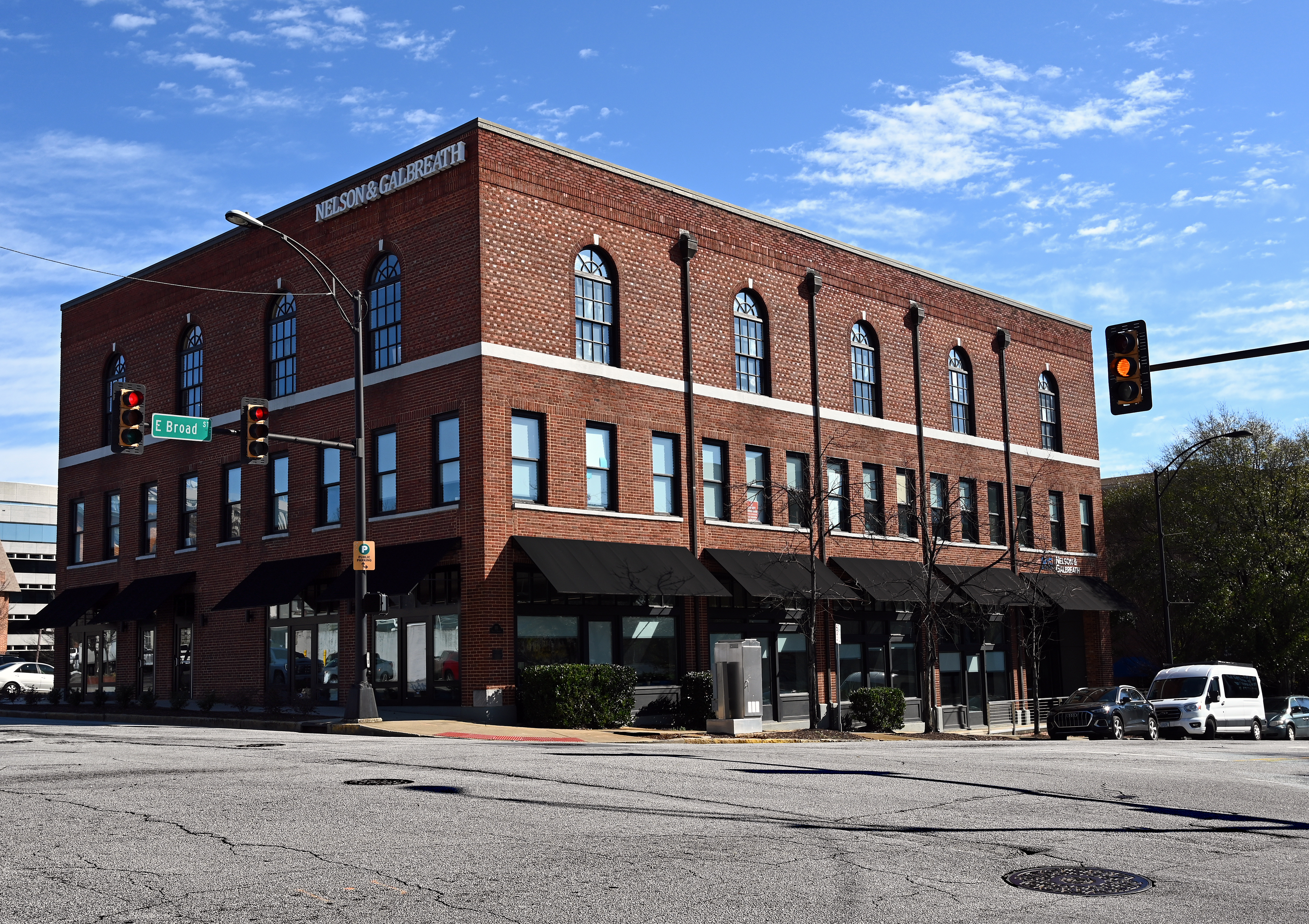
- Working Benevolent Temple and Professional Building

- Location within South Carolina Location within the United States
- Location: Broad and Fall Sts., Greenville, South Carolina
- Coordinates: 34°50′50″N 82°23′56″W
- Area: 0.2 acres (0.081 ha)
- Built: 1922
- Built by: Working Benevolent State Grand Lodge
- MPS: Greenville MRA
- NRHP reference No.: 82003865
- Added to NRHP: July 1, 1982

Working Benevolent Temple and Professional Building is a historic office building located at Greenville, South Carolina. It was built in 1922, and is a three-story, steel frame brick building. The building housed offices for African-American doctors, lawyers, dentists, a newspaper, and insurance firms and housed the first black mortuary in Greenville. The temple was also the center for Greenville's civil rights activities during the 1960s.

It was added to the National Register of Historic Places in 1982.
