= Edmund H. Deas House =

Historic house in South Carolina, United States

- U.S. National Register of Historic Places
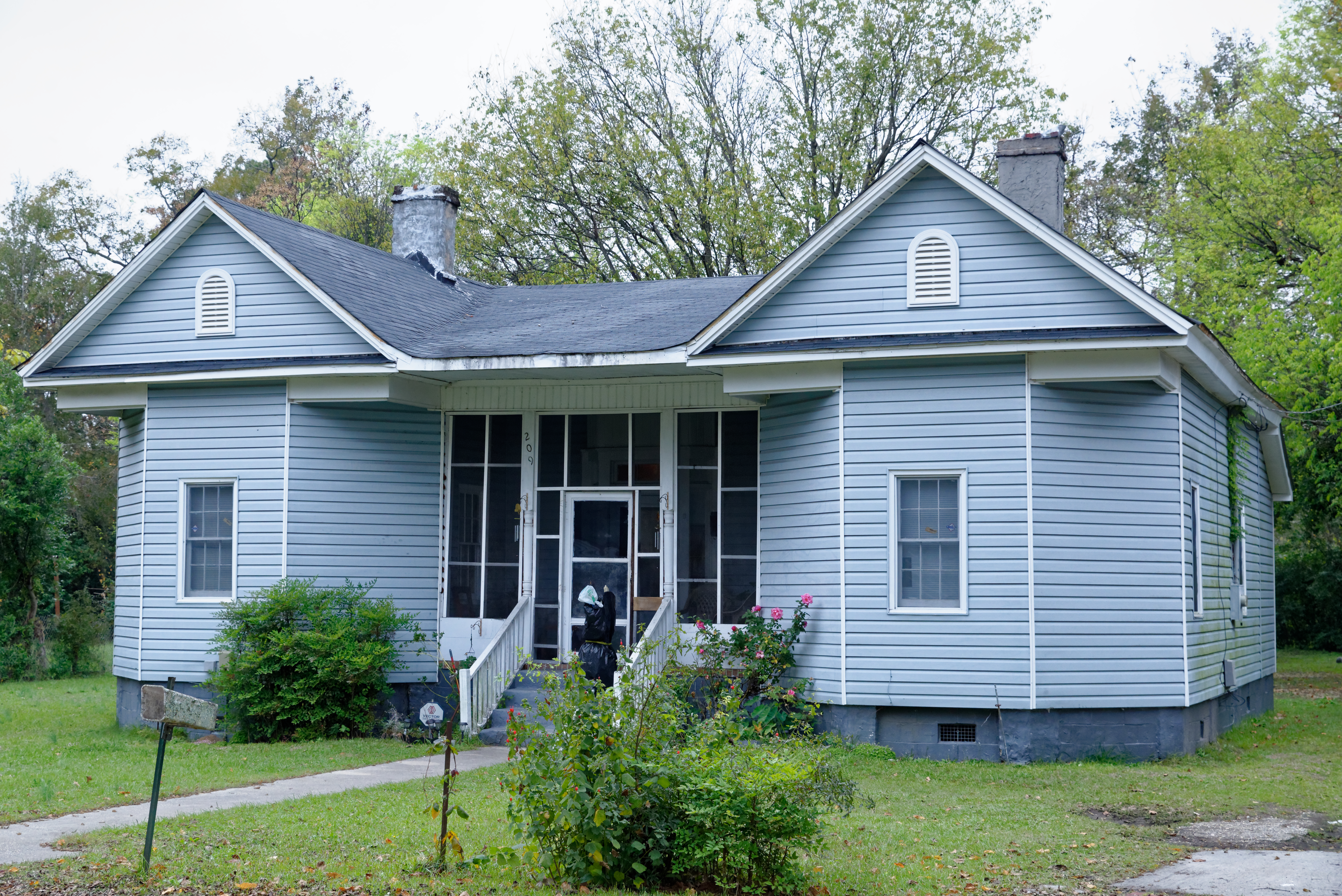

- Location within South Carolina Location within the United States
- Location: 229 Avenue E, Darlington, South Carolina
- Coordinates: 34°17′44″N 79°51′46″W
- Area: less than one acre
- Built: 1890
- Architectural style: Stick/Eastlake
- MPS: City of Darlington MRA
- NRHP reference No.: 88000045
- Added to NRHP: February 10, 1988

Edmund H. Deas House is a historic house located at 229 Avenue E in Darlington, Darlington County, South Carolina.

== Description and history ==
It was built about 1890, and is a one-story, frame Eastlake movement-influenced vernacular cottage. It has shiplap siding and a hip and gable roof with bracketed cornices and pedimented gables. It also has projecting polygonal bays with a single window in each face. It was the home of African-American politician Edmund H. Deas, who served as county chairman of the Republican Party in 1884 and 1888. He was also a South Carolina delegate to the Republican National Conventions of 1888, 1896, 1900, and 1908.

It was listed on the National Register of Historic Places on February 10, 1988.
