= John Wesley Methodist Episcopal Church =

Historic church in South Carolina, United States

- Wesley, John, Methodist Episcopal Church
- U.S. National Register of Historic Places
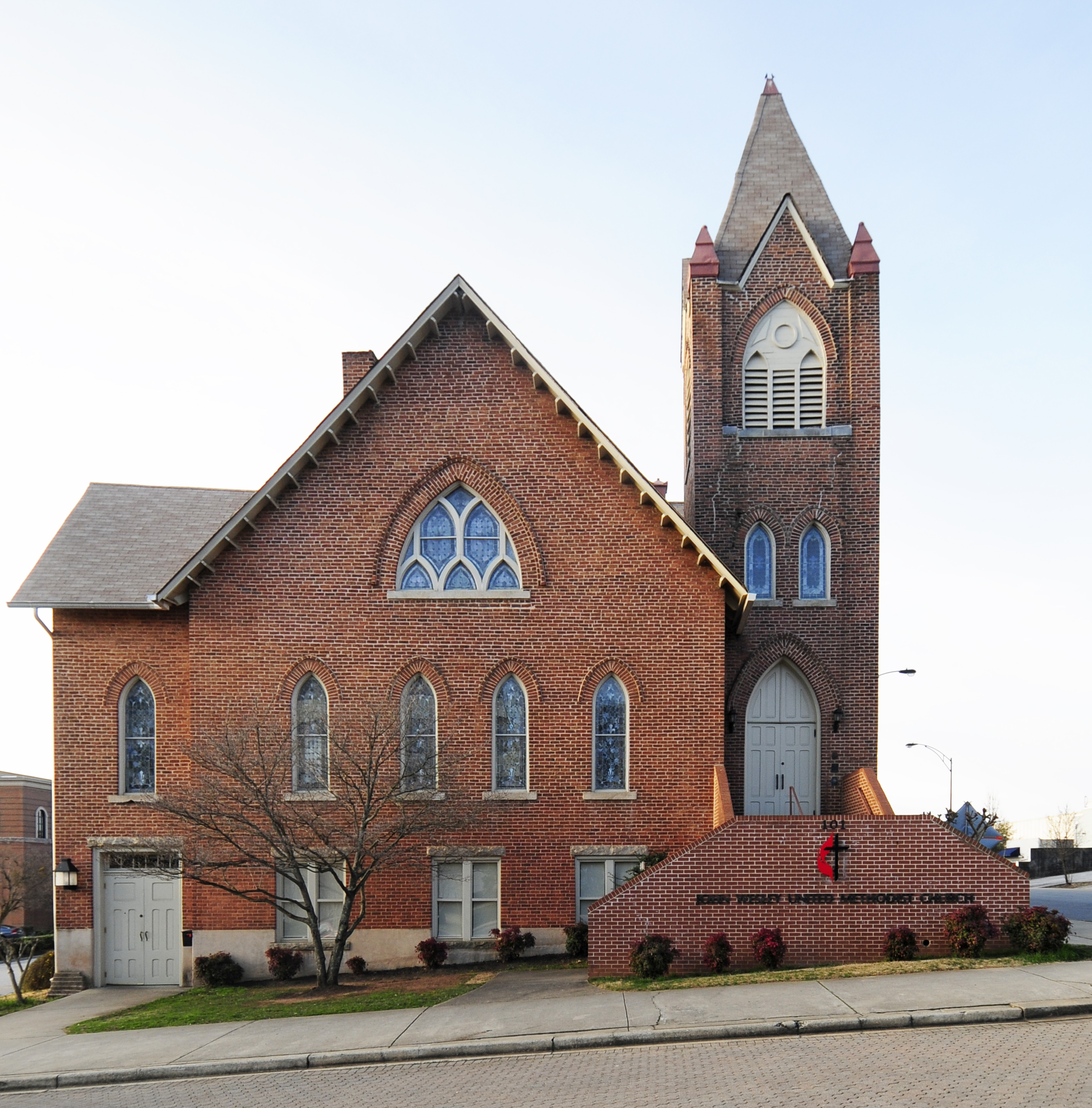

- Location within South Carolina Location within the United States
- Location: 101 E. Court St., Greenville, South Carolina
- Coordinates: 34°50′52″N 82°23′55″W
- Area: less than one acre
- Built: 1899
- Architectural style: Gothic Revival, Vernacular
- NRHP reference No.: 78002514
- Added to NRHP: January 20, 1978

John Wesley Methodist Episcopal Church is a historic church at 101 E. Court Street in Greenville, South Carolina, United States. The church was founded in 1866 by James R. Rosemond, who was a former slave. It was originally named Silver Hill United Methodist Episcopal Church, and was renamed after John Wesley in 1902.

The current building was built in 1899 and added to the National Register in 1978.
