= Thomas English House =

Historic house in South Carolina, United States

- U.S. National Register of Historic Places
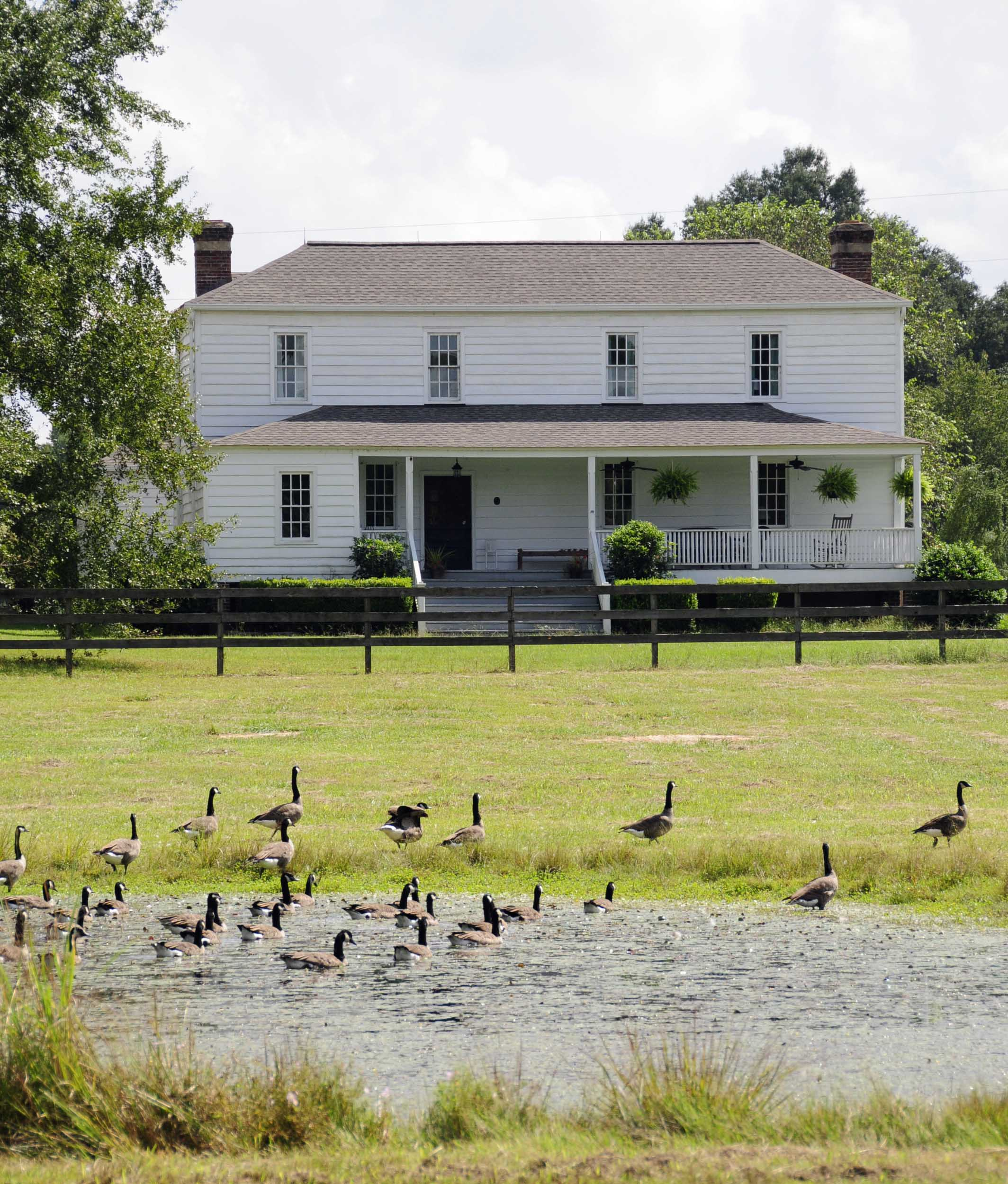
- Thomas English House, September 2012

- Location within South Carolina Location within the United States
- Location: SC 92, 0.6 mi. W of jct. with SC 93, Camden, South Carolina
- Coordinates: 34°10′17″N 80°32′26″W
- Area: 6.3 acres (2.5 ha)
- Built: c. 1800
- Built by: English, Thomas
- Architectural style: Federal, Vernacular Center-hall house
- NRHP reference No.: 82003871
- Added to NRHP: July 22, 1993

Thomas English House, also known as the Murchison House, is a historic home located at Camden, Kershaw County, South Carolina. It was built about 1800, and is a two-story, five-bay, hip-roofed, frame and beaded weatherboard Federal I-house. It is set on brick piers connected by a recessed, stucco-covered, concrete block curtain wall. The front façade features a one-story, full-length, hip-roofed porch.

It was listed on the National Register of Historic Places in 1993.
