= Hampton Pinckney =

Neighborhood in Greenville, South Carolina

- Hampton–Pinckney Historic District
- U.S. National Register of Historic Places
- U.S. Historic district
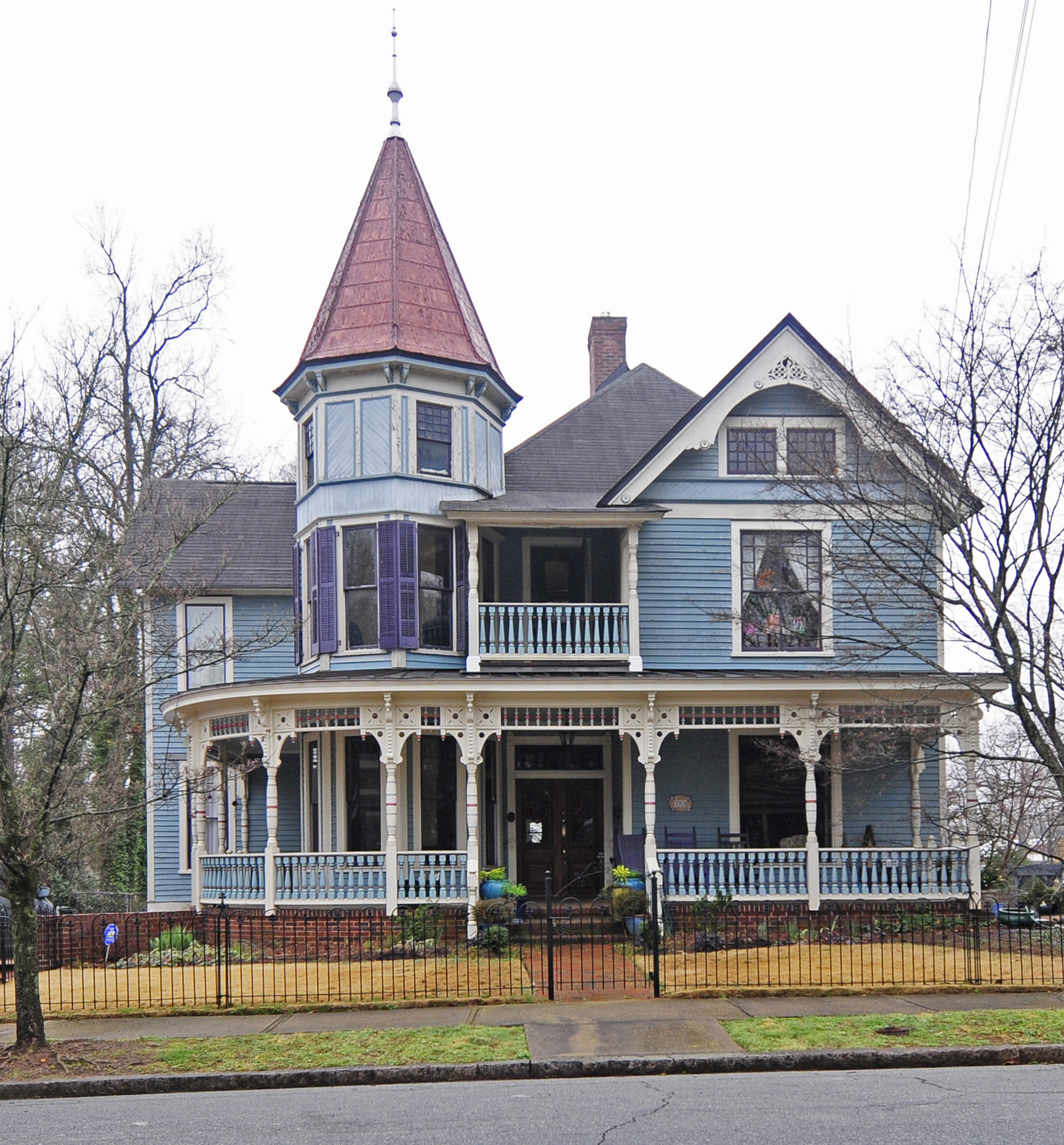
- J. M. Geer House, Hampton–Pinckney Historic District, March 2012

- Location within South Carolina Location within the United States
- Location: Hampton Ave. and Pinckney St. between Butler Ave. and Lloyd St.; Hampton, Lloyd, Hudson Sts., Butler and Asbury Aves., Greenville, South Carolina
- Coordinates: 34°51′22″N 82°24′21″W
- Area: 30 acres (12 ha)
- Built by: Geer, J.M.; Et al.
- Architectural style: Italianate, Queen Anne, Colonial Revival, Gothic Revival
- MPS: Greenville MRA
- NRHP reference No.: 77001226, 82003858 (Boundary Increase)
- Added to NRHP: December 12, 1977, July 1, 1982 (Boundary Increase)

Hampton Pinckney is a neighborhood and national historic district located in Greenville, South Carolina. One of the oldest neighborhoods in Greenville, it was where the textile industry was started in the early 19th century and lasted until the 1920s. The first trolley car in Greenville was installed in this neighborhood in 1899, opening for business in 1901.

It encompasses 70 contributing buildings in a residential section of Greenville. The houses date from about 1890 to 1930, and include Italianate, Greek Revival, Queen Anne, various bungalows, and examples of Gothic Revival and Colonial Revival design, as well as vernacular forms. The oldest house in the district is the McBee House (ca. 1835).

It was added to the National Register of Historic Places in 1977, with a boundary increase in 1982.

== Bibliography ==
- City of Greenville, South Carolina historic districts, including Hampton-Pinckney. - accessed 27 June 2010.
- History of Hampton-Pinckney Historic District in Greenville, South Carolina. - accessed 27 June 2010.
- Official website. - accessed 27 June 2010.
