= Afro-American Insurance Company Building =

- U.S. National Register of Historic Places
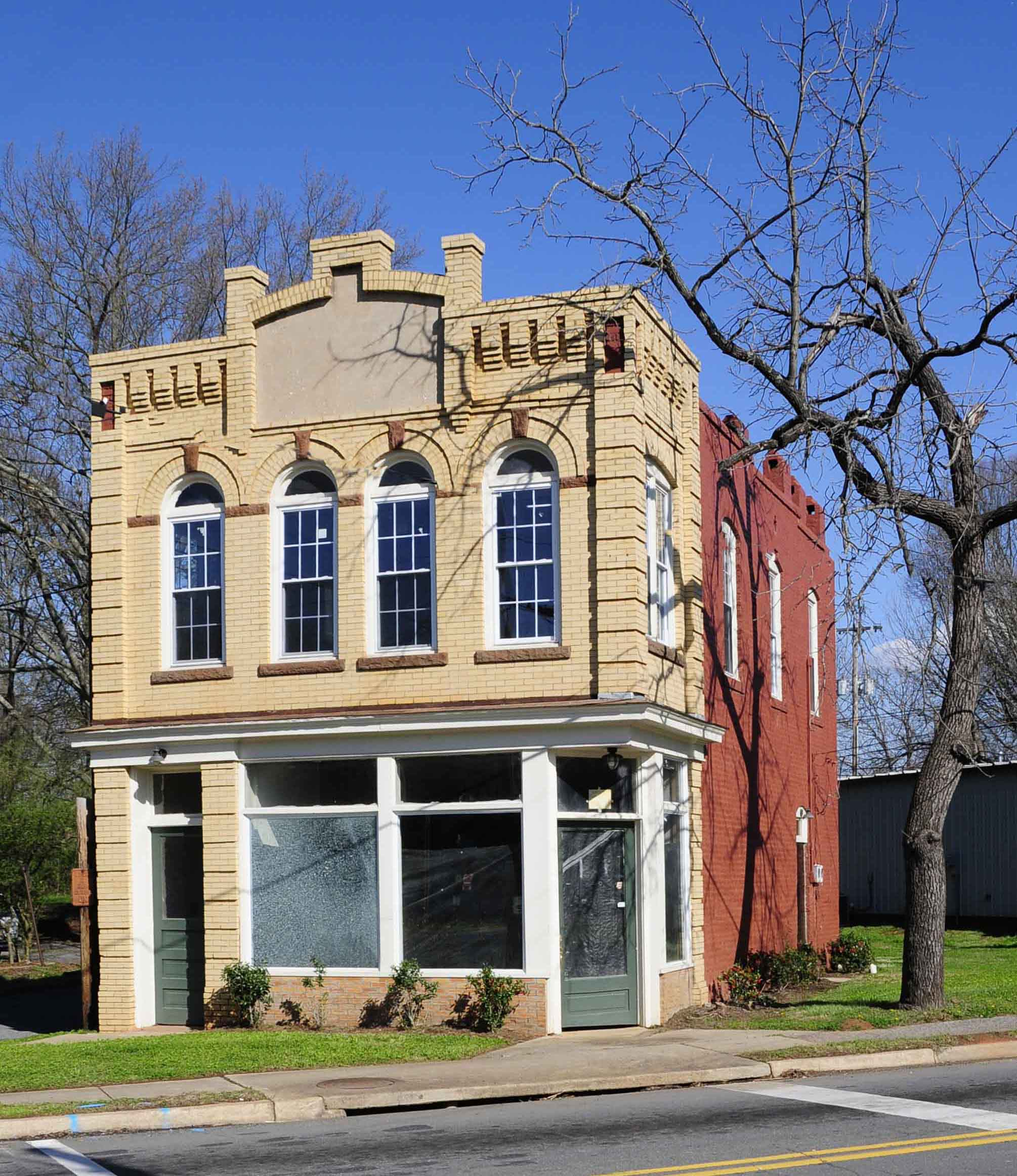
- Afro-American Insurance Company Building, March 2012

- Location within South Carolina Location within the United States
- Location: 558 S. Dave Lyle Blvd., Rock Hill, South Carolina
- Coordinates: 34°55′19″N 81°2′9″W
- Area: less than one acre
- Built: 1909
- Architect: Smith, William W.
- Architectural style: Chicago, The Commercial Style
- MPS: Rock Hill MPS
- NRHP reference No.: 92000651
- Added to NRHP: June 10, 1992

Afro-American Insurance Company Building is a historic commercial building located at Rock Hill, South Carolina. It was built about 1909, and is a two-story, brick commercial building. The façade has a tan brick veneer, while the sides and rear are in red brick. It is an important surviving example of a commercial building related to the African-American community of the early-20th century.

It was listed on the National Register of Historic Places in 1992.
