= Harden Street Substation =

- U.S. National Register of Historic Places
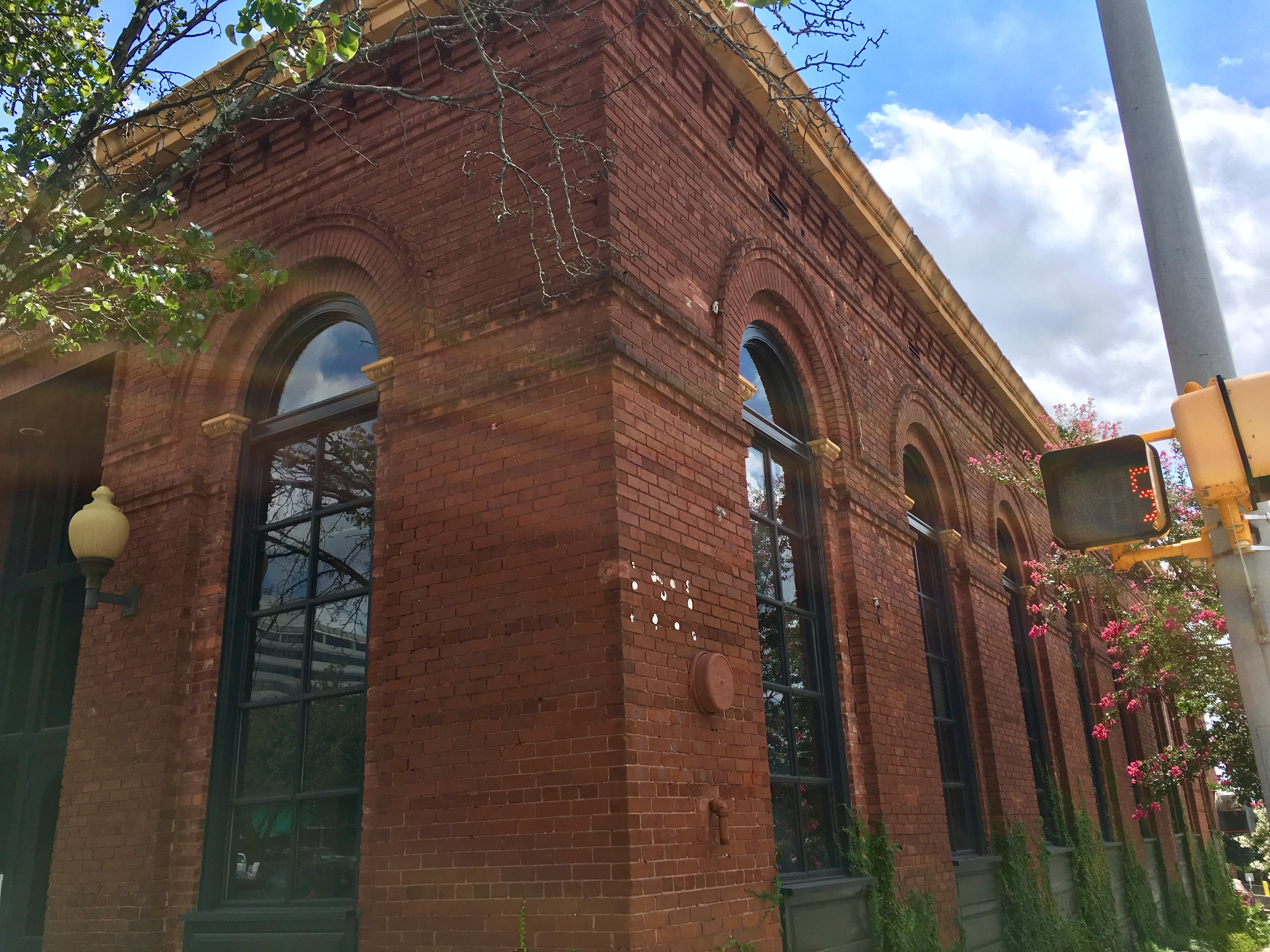

- Location within South Carolina Location within the United States
- Location: 1901 Harden St. Columbia, South Carolina
- Coordinates: 34°0′53″N 81°1′25″W
- Area: less than one acre
- Built: 1953
- Architect: Singley, Heyward
- Architectural style: Moderne
- MPS: Segregation in Columbia, South Carolina MPS
- NRHP reference No.: 05001103
- Added to NRHP: September 28, 2005

Harden Street Substation, also known as Harden Street Fire Station, is a historic fire station located at Columbia, South Carolina. It was built in 1953, and is a two-story, rectangular brick building with a flat roof constructed in the Moderne style. It was built by the city of Columbia to house African-American firemen under white officers and maintain institutional segregation.

It was added to the National Register of Historic Places in 2005.
