= Harriet M. Cornwell Tourist House =

Historic house in South Carolina, United States

- U.S. National Register of Historic Places
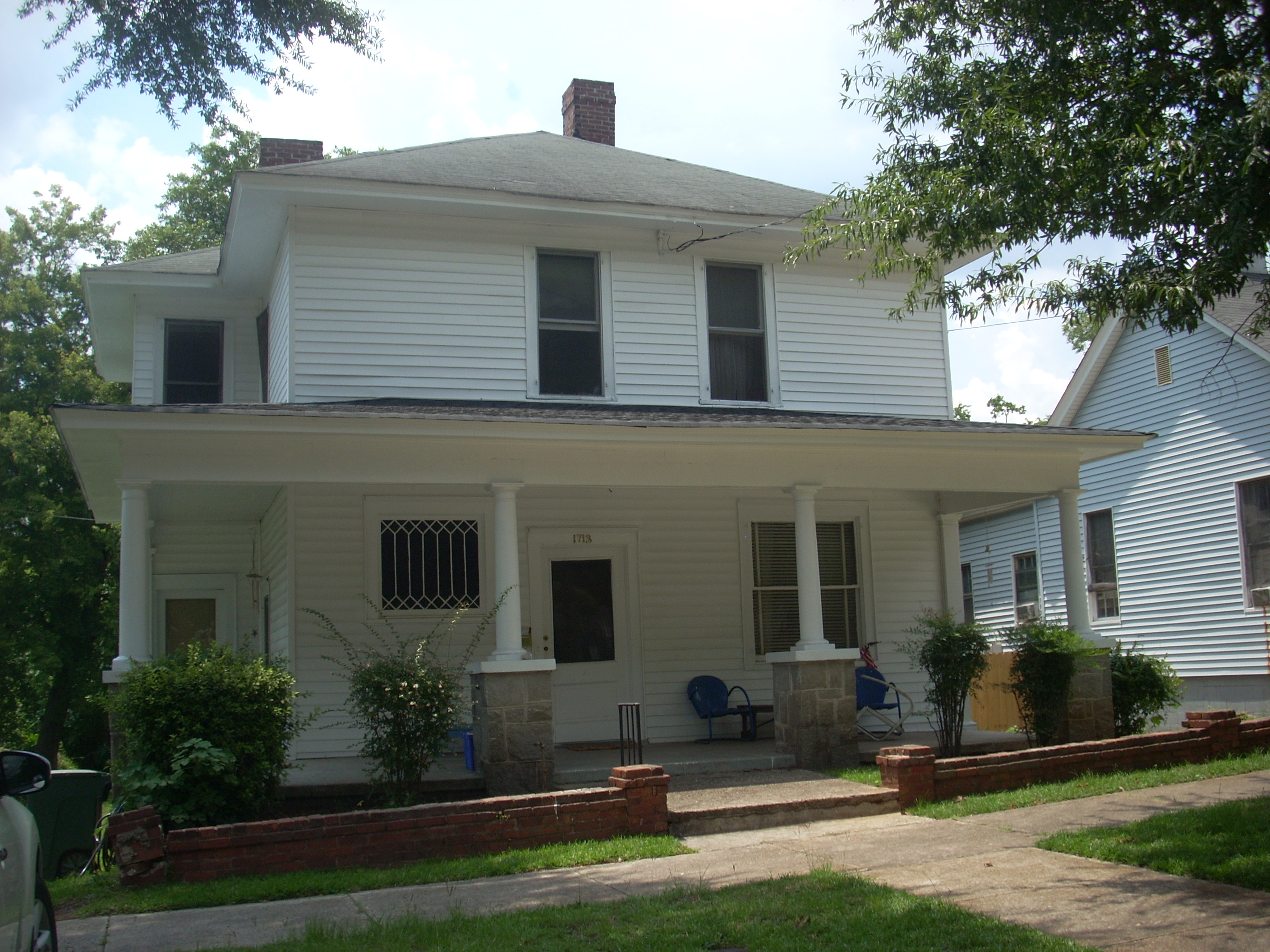
- Harriet M. Cornwell Tourist Home, July 2012

- Location within South Carolina Location within the United States
- Location: 1713 Wayne St., Columbia, South Carolina
- Coordinates: 34°0′27″N 81°2′43″W
- Area: less than one acre
- Built: 1895
- Architectural style: American Four-Square
- MPS: Segregation in Columbia, South Carolina MPS
- NRHP reference No.: 07001083
- Added to NRHP: October 5, 2007

Harriet M. Cornwell Tourist House is a historic tourist home for African-American patrons located at Columbia, South Carolina. It was built about 1895, and is a two-story, frame American Foursquare style dwelling. It has a hipped roof and features a one-story wraparound porch. Mrs. Cornwell began operating her house as a tourist home during the 1940s.

It was added to the National Register of Historic Places in 2007. A historical marker was erected in 2014.
