= Mann-Simons Cottage =

Historic house in South Carolina, United States

- U.S. National Register of Historic Places
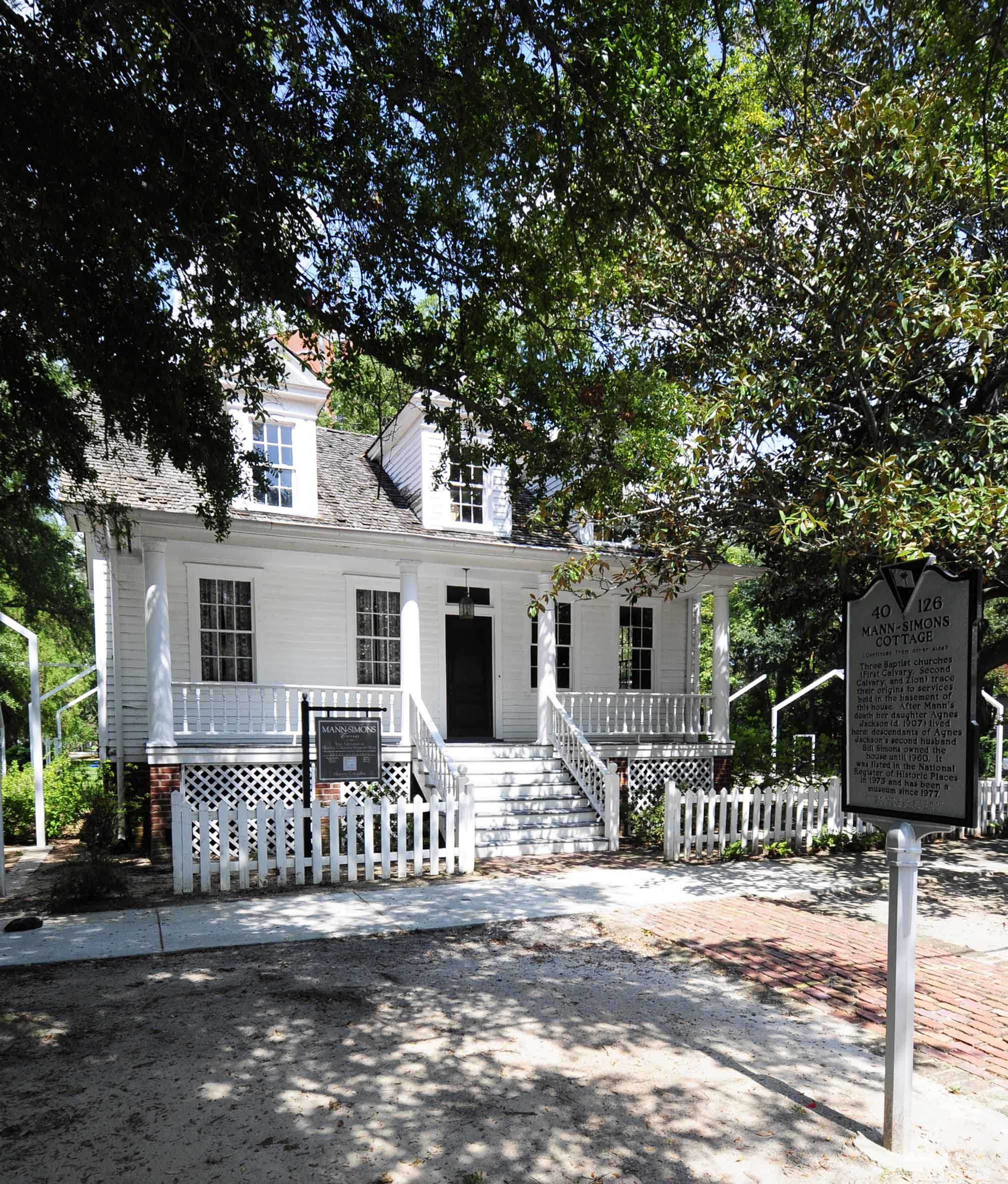
- Mann-Simons Cottage, September 2012

- Location within South Carolina Location within the United States
- Location: 1403 Richland St., Columbia, South Carolina
- Coordinates: 34°0′42″N 81°2′4″W
- Area: 0.3 acres (0.12 ha)
- Built: 1875
- Architectural style: Columbia Cottage
- NRHP reference No.: 73001726
- Added to NRHP: April 23, 1973

The Mann-Simons Cottage is a historic house located at the corner of Richland and Marion streets in Columbia, South Carolina. Ben DeLane, a freedman, purchased the property for his wife Celia Mann in 1843; daughter Agnes Jackson Simons inherited the house and lot upon Celia's death in 1867. In the 1870s, the earlier hall and parlor house was removed and a 1½ story "cottage style" house was built on the site of the original structure. The property remained in the Mann-Simmons family until 1970, when it was acquired by the Columbia Housing Authority. The site was listed in the National Register of Historic Places in 1973 and opened to the public as a historic house museum five years later. The site is notable as a representation of the economic and cultural life of the free Black community in Columbia during the Antebellum and Reconstruction eras.

The surviving "cottage style" house was built between approximately 1872 and 1880. The front façade features a raised porch and four Tuscan order columns supporting the gabled roof. Other notable features include three unevenly spaced dormers along the façade and a raised basement. Several additional structures that once stood on the property, including a grocery and a second, smaller hall and parlor house on Marion Street, no longer stand.

== History ==
=== Celia Mann ===
Celia Mann was born into slavery in Charleston, South Carolina in 1799. Her husband, Ben DeLane, likely purchased his freedom with wages he earned working as a boatman in the river trade. In 1843 DeLane purchased a 208 by 104 ft (64 by 32 m) lot on Lumber and Marion streets in Columbia from James S. Guinard for Celia. Ben DeLane is listed in the 1840 census as the owner of three enslaved persons—likely Celia, her daughter Agnes, and DeLane's daughter Mary. It is unknown how or when Celia gained her freedom, although she was certainly free by 1850, when she is listed in the United States census.

Celia Mann was a midwife and prominent in the free Black community in Columbia. The family was one of several free Black households that comprised 6 percent of the population of Columbia in 1850. After the American Civil War, the Cavalry Baptist Church was formed in her house in Columbia—the first of several Black Baptist congregations which met at the Mann-Simmons house. Her last will and testament, dated August 25, 1867 and signed with an "X," left the property to her daughter, Agnes. Celia died two weeks later on September 8, 1867.

=== Agnes Jackson Simons ===
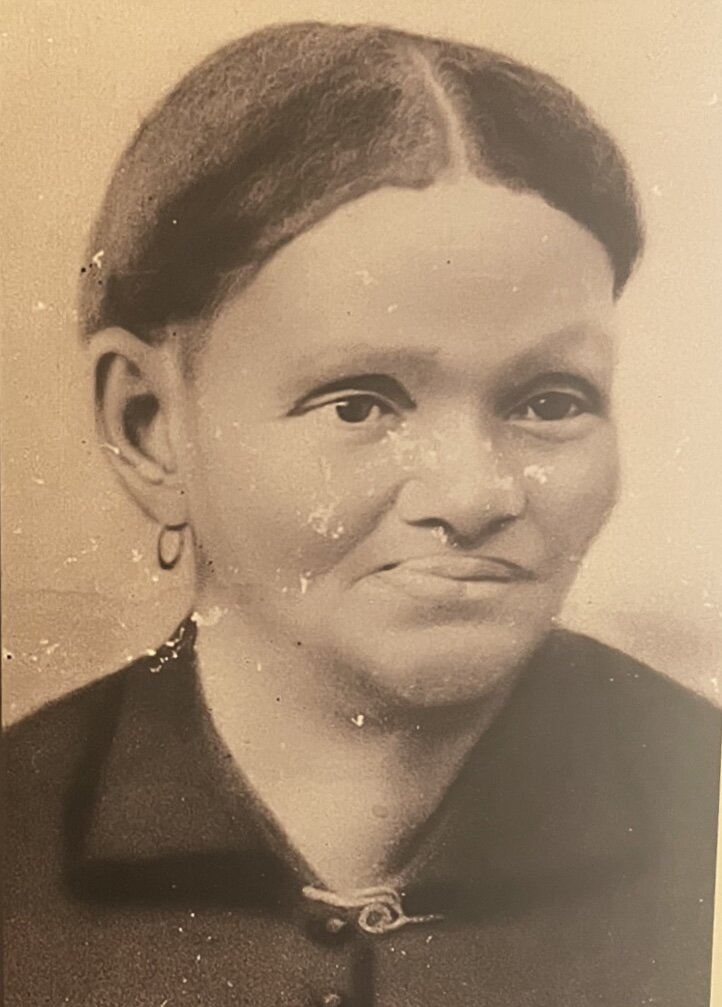
Agnes Jackson Simons c. 1880s

Agnes Jackson was born in South Carolina in 1831. In the document recording the sale of the lot on Lumber and Marion streets in Columbia, she is referred to as "the daughter of the said Celia," indicating Ben DeLane was not her biological parent. Her first child, Hattie Jackson, was born in 1853. Sometime before 1858, Agnes married William "Bill" Simons, a free man of color and popular musician. Following Celia's death in 1867, the Simonses significantly developed the property, replacing the original hall and parlor house with a larger "cottage style" dwelling and building several additional structures. One of these was operated as a lunch counter between 1891 and 1904 and later as a grocery.

=== Charles Simons ===
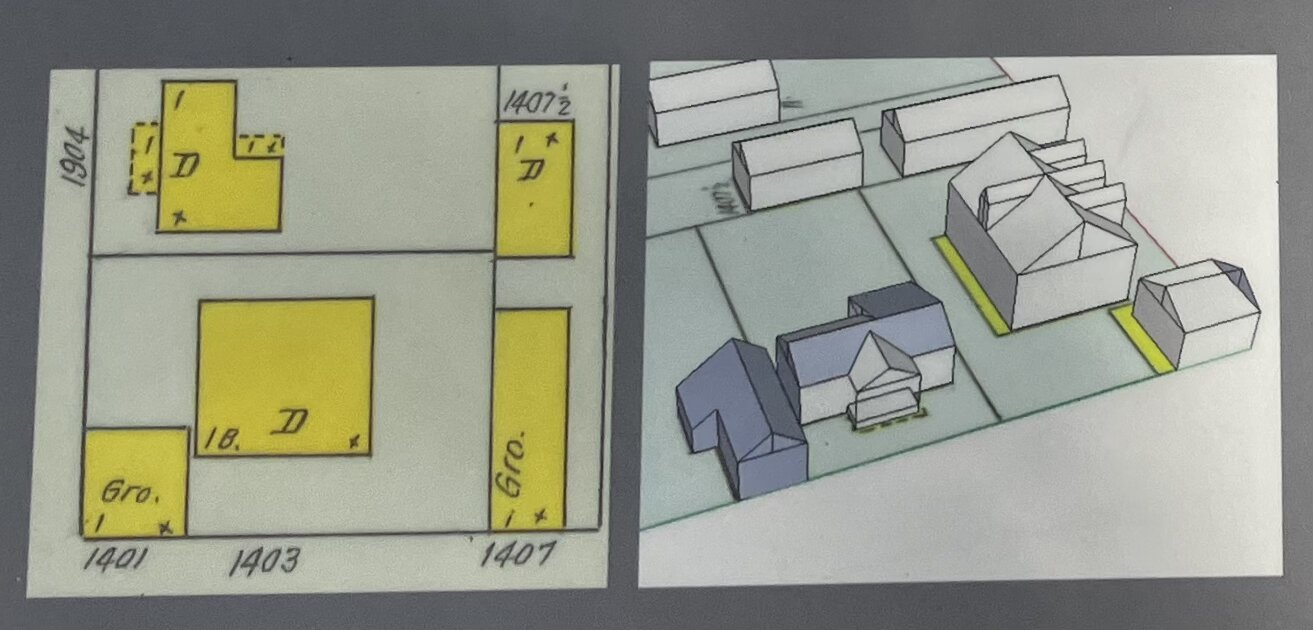
Map of the Mann-Simons site

After Agnes's death in 1907, the property passed to her son, Charles. Charles was a prominent man in the Black community, a deacon in the Baptist Church, and a Freemason. In 1912, Charles purchased adjoining lots on Marion Street and built three two-story American foursquare houses which he rented. While the west side of Marion Street was a historically Black neighborhood, after 1913 Simons rented exclusively to white tenants, mostly immigrants of Eastern and Southern European origin, reflecting larger demographic changes in the city. Ownership of rental properties allowed Charles to attain a middle-class existence that remained out of reach for most Black South Carolinians in the early twentieth century.

=== Later generations ===
Charles's widow, Amanda Green Simons, inherited the property upon his death in 1933. Amanda sold the rental properties along Marion Street, reducing the family's holdings to their original size. A dressmaker, she remained a respected figure in the Black community in her own right. Upon her death in 1960, the property passed to her niece and adopted daughter, Bernice Conners. When the Columbia Housing Authority acquired the property in 1970, Conners was the last member of the Mann-Simmons family to live in the 1870s-era house.

== Preservation ==
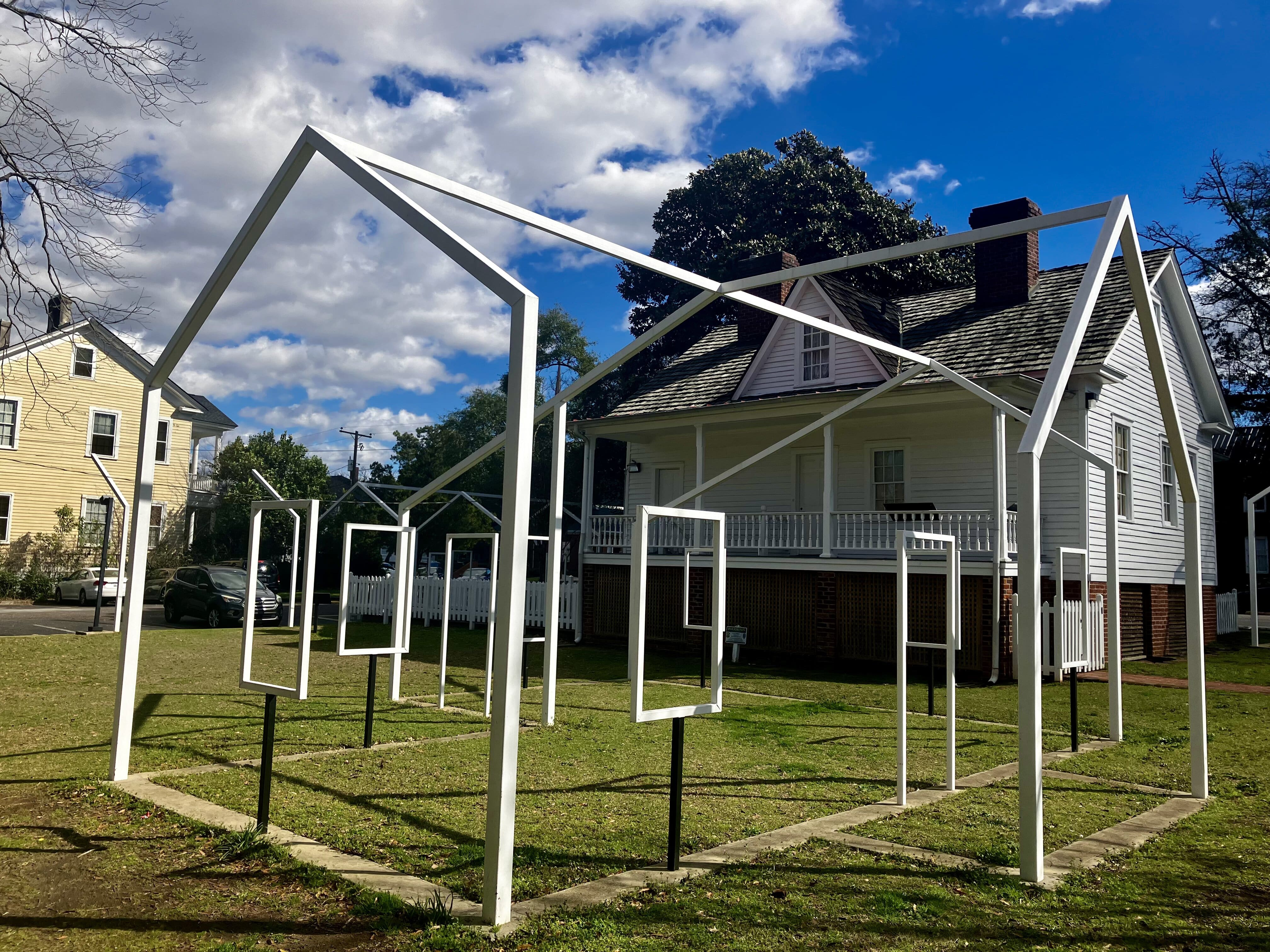
"Ghost structures" representing former buildings on the site

In 1970, the Columbia Housing Authority seized the property through eminent domain and announced plans for a low-income senior apartment complex on the site following demolition of the historic house. A grassroots campaign led by Robbie Atkinson, the great-great-granddaughter of Celia Mann, and supported substantially by the Black community, succeeded in having the house listed in the National Registry of History Places in 1973. The house was purchased by the Richland County Historic Preservation Society, which managed the site as a historic house museum.

In 1994, the city of Columbia purchased the site and placed it under the stewardship of the Historic Columbia Foundation. Extensive archaeological work between 2006 and 2012 provided the basis for a revision of the site's interpretation to conform to new evidence. Reflecting the role of local Black activists in saving the site from destruction in the 1970s, Black community organizations such as the Wisteria Garden Club and the Calvary Baptist Church have deep ties to the site and play an active role in its interpretation and stewardship. Community concerns and oversight guided development of the revised site interpretation in 2014–16.

== Bibliography ==
- Crockett, Jakob D. (2016). History and Archaeology at the Mann Simons Site. Columbia, SC: Columbia Archaeology Program.
- Kearse, Bernard V. (March 16, 1973). The Simons Cottage (PDF) (Report). National Register of Historic Places.
- Moore, Porchia (2017). "Our Stories, Our Places: Centering the Community as Narrative Voice in the Reinterpretation of an African American Historic Site". In Connolly, Robert P.; Bollwerk, Elizabeth A. (eds.). Positioning Your Museum as a Critical Community Asset: A Practical Guide. Lanham, MD: Rowman & Littlefield. pp. 79–86.
- Williams, Jai (2019). Plantations and Historic Homes of South Carolina. Lanham, MD: Globe Pequot.
