= Jacob Bedenbaugh House =

Historic house in South Carolina, United States

- U.S. National Register of Historic Places
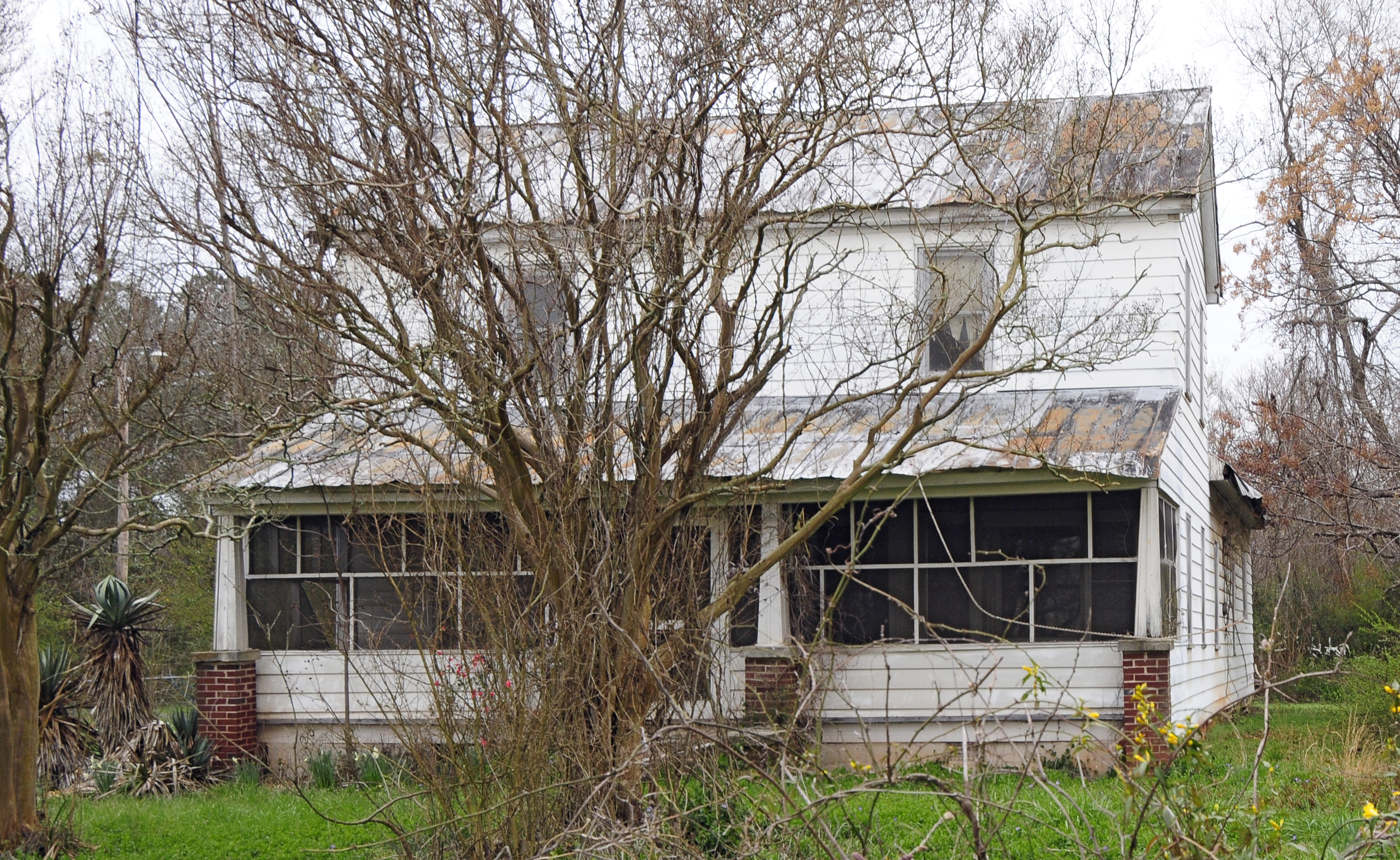
- Jacob Bedenbaugh House, March 2012

- Location within South Carolina Location within the United States
- Location: 1185 South Carolina Highway 773, near Prosperity, South Carolina
- Coordinates: 34°13′41″N 81°28′10″W
- Area: Less than one acre
- Built: c. 1860
- NRHP reference No.: 11000732
- Added to NRHP: October 6, 2011

The Jacob Bedenbaugh House is an historic home located near Prosperity, Newberry County, South Carolina. It was built about 1860, and is a two-story, frame I-house. It was the home of Jacob and Sarah Bedenbaugh, an interracial couple remained together for 42 years during the late-19h and early-20th centuries.

The home is still owned by the descendants of Jacob and Sarah Bedenbaugh.

It was listed on the National Register of Historic Places in 2011.
