= West Main Street Historic District (Chesterfield, South Carolina) =

Historic district in South Carolina, United States

- U.S. National Register of Historic Places
- U.S. Historic district
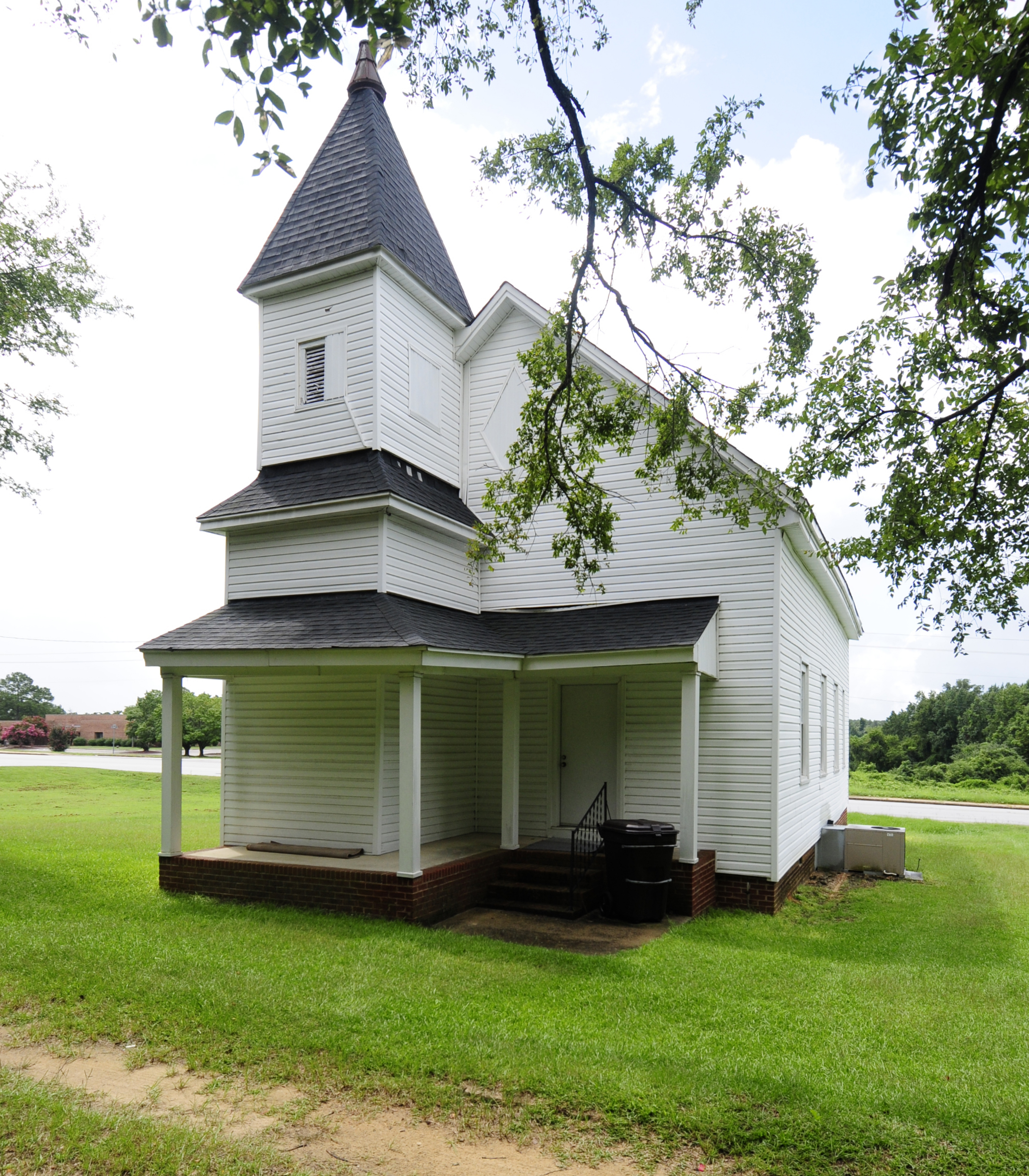
- Mount Tabor United Methodist Church, West Main Street Historic District, August 2012

- Location within South Carolina Location within the United States
- Location: W. Main, Church and Academy Sts., Chesterfield, South Carolina
- Coordinates: 34°44′09″N 80°05′33″W
- Area: 21 acres (8.5 ha)
- Built: 1858
- Architectural style: Late 19th And 20th Century Revivals, Late Victorian, Gothic Revival
- MPS: Chesterfield MRA
- NRHP reference No.: 82003849
- Added to NRHP: May 4, 1982

West Main Street Historic District is a national historic district located at Chesterfield, Chesterfield County, South Carolina. The district encompasses 13 contributing buildings in a primarily residential section of the town of Chesterfield dating from about 1858 to 1930. They include the ornate, Gothic Revival Austin-Craig House, built in 1858, and two churches, a school, and five larger residences built between 1900–1930. Many properties are of brick construction. Freedmen of the community built one of the churches in the district in 1878, and it is the only identified ecclesiastical building in Chesterfield to have survived this period. One early commercial building, now used as apartments, is also included in the historic district.

It was listed on the National Register of Historic Places in 1982.
