= Mt. Zion Rosenwald School =

- U.S. National Register of Historic Places
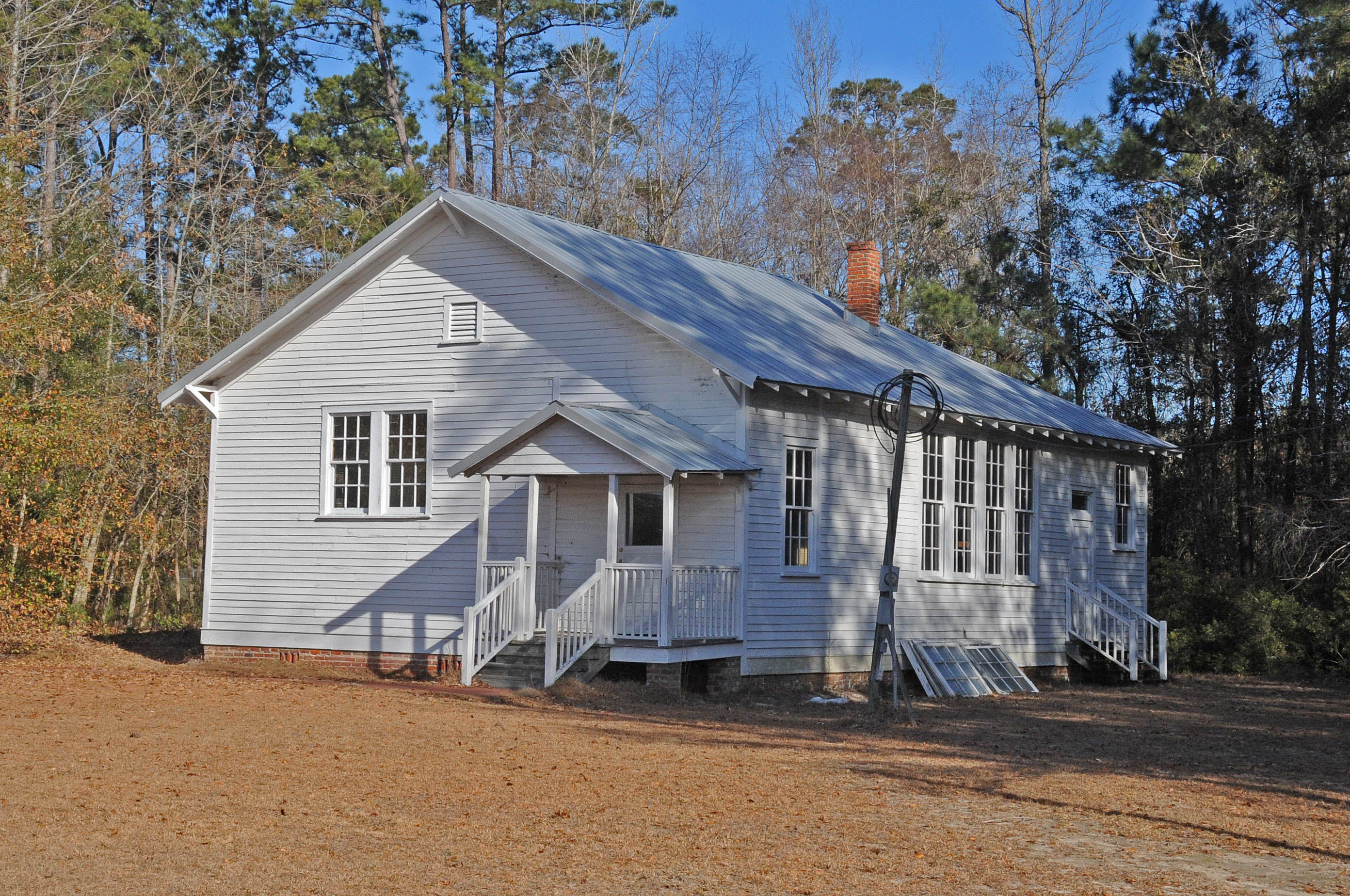

- Location within South Carolina Location within the United States
- Nearest city: 5040 Liberty Chapel Rd., near Florence, South Carolina
- Coordinates: 34°10′48″N 79°38′37″W
- Area: 4 acres (1.6 ha)
- Built: 1952
- Architectural style: Standardized non-residential
- MPS: The Rosenwald School Building Program in South Carolina, 1917-1932
- NRHP reference No.: 01001098
- Added to NRHP: October 12, 2001

Mt. Zion Rosenwald School, also known as Mt. Zion-Rosenwald Colored School, is a historic Rosenwald School building located near Florence, Florence County, South Carolina. It was built in 1925, and is a rectangular frame building with tall exterior windows. It is a "two or three teacher" school building. Construction of the project was funded in part by the Julius Rosenwald Fund, which helped build more than 5,300 black school buildings across the south from 1917 to 1932.

It was listed on the National Register of Historic Places in 2001.
