= Richland Cemetery =

Cemetery in South Carolina, US

- U.S. National Register of Historic Places
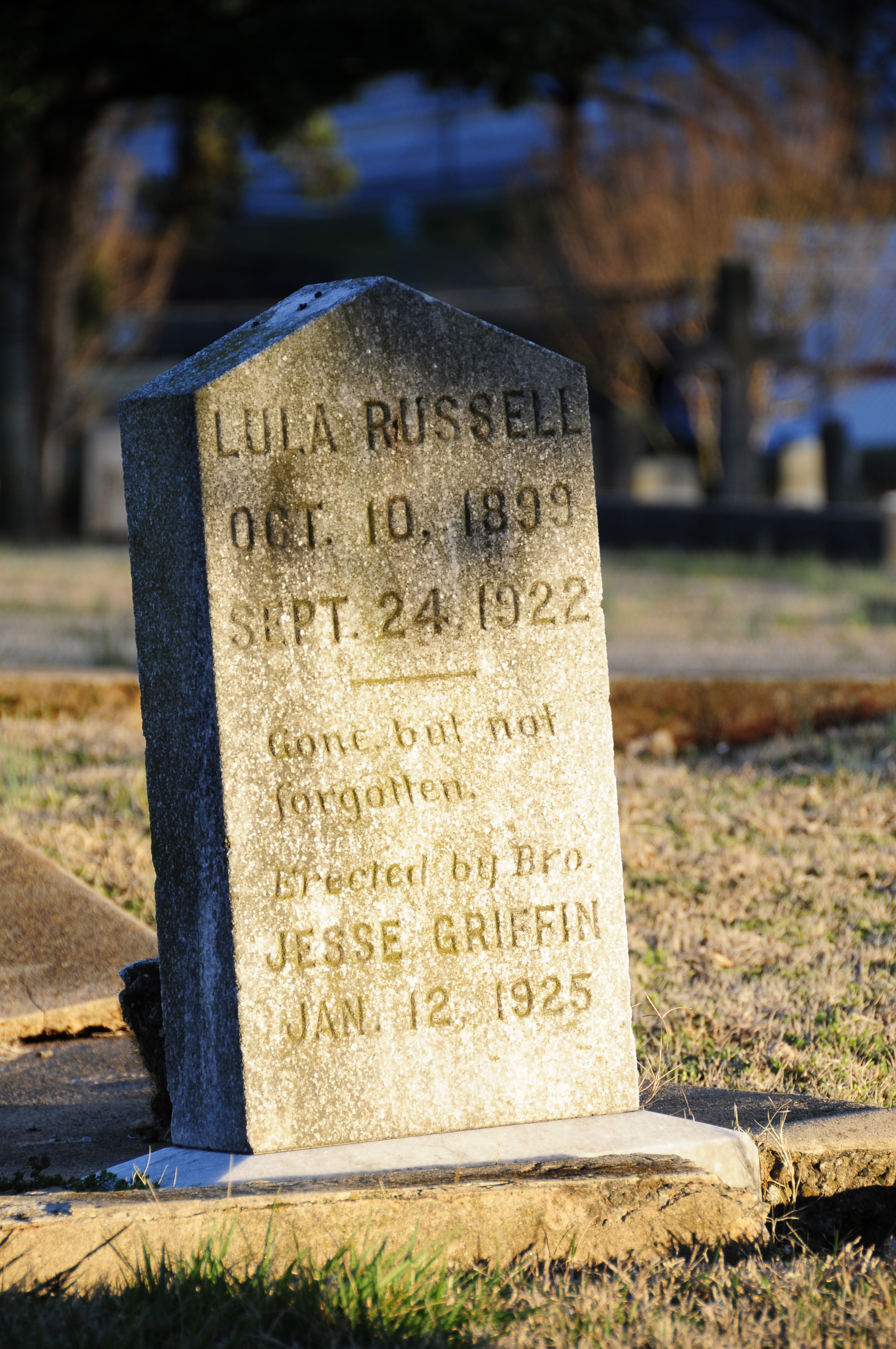
- Richland Cemetery, February 2012

- Location within South Carolina Location within the United States
- Location: Hilly St. and Sunflower St., Greenville, South Carolina
- Coordinates: 34°51′23.9″N 82°23′12.8″W
- Area: 6 acres (2.4 ha)
- Built: 1884
- NRHP reference No.: 05001155
- Added to NRHP: October 4, 2005

Richland Cemetery is a historic African-American cemetery located at Greenville, South Carolina. It was established in 1884 by the City of Greenville as the first municipal "colored" cemetery. It is the final resting place for many of Greenville's most notable African-American educators, health practitioners, and community leaders. The total number of graves is estimated at over 1,400 and gravemarker types and materials range from natural stones to elaborate Victorian monuments.

It was added to the National Register of Historic Places in 2005.
