= Wesley Methodist Church (Columbia, South Carolina) =

Historic church in South Carolina, United States

- U.S. National Register of Historic Places
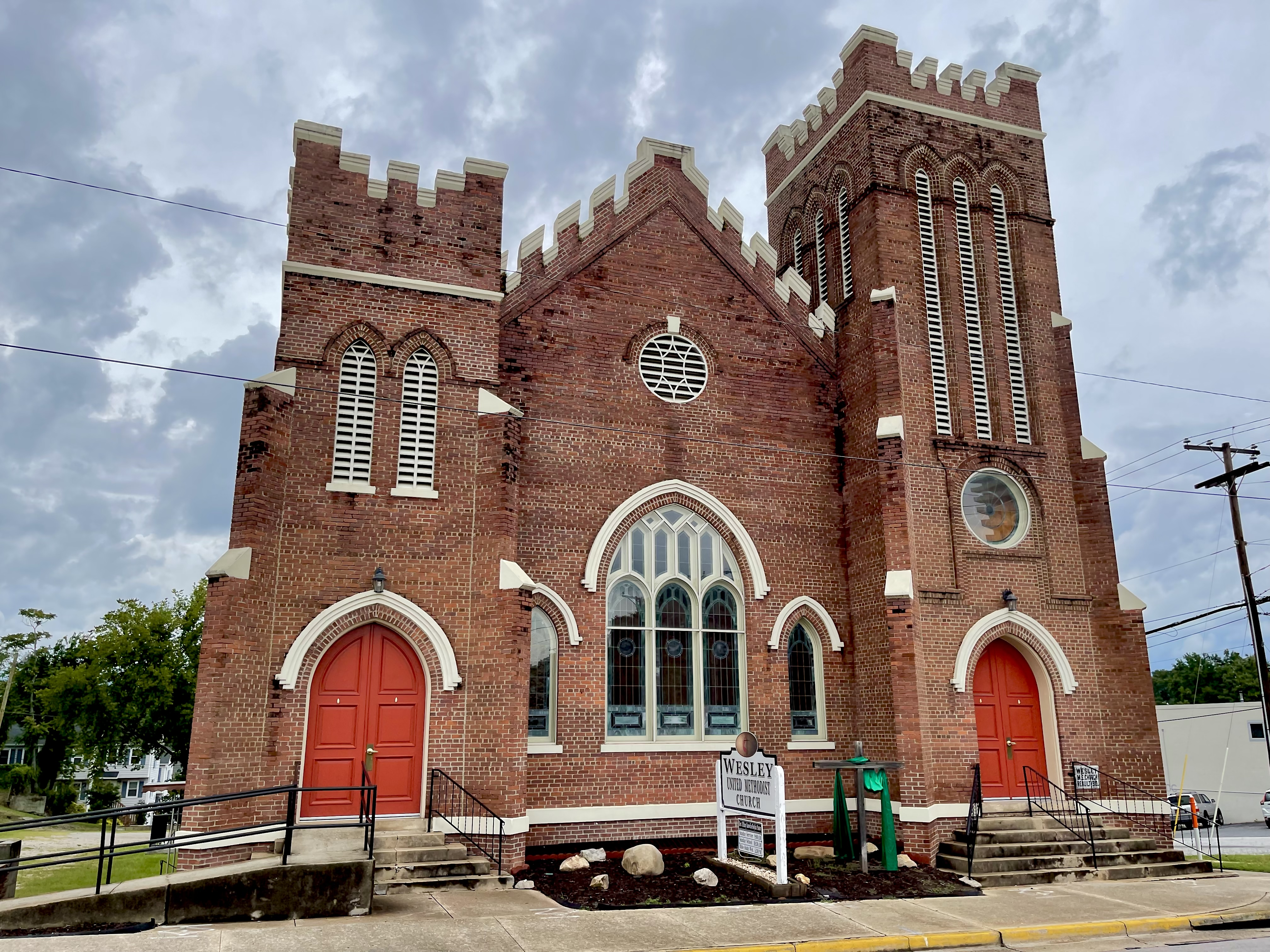

- Location within South Carolina Location within the United States
- Location: 1727 Gervais St. Columbia, South Carolina
- Coordinates: 34.00443°N 81.0243°W
- Area: less than one acre
- Built: 1911
- Architect: Arthur W. Hamby
- Architectural style: Late Gothic Revival
- MPS: Segregation in Columbia, South Carolina MPS
- NRHP reference No.: 08001398
- Added to NRHP: January 29, 2009

Wesley Methodist Church is a historic church at 1727 Gervais Street in Columbia, South Carolina.

It was built in 1911 and added to the National Register in 2009.
