= A.P. Williams Funeral Home =

- U.S. National Register of Historic Places
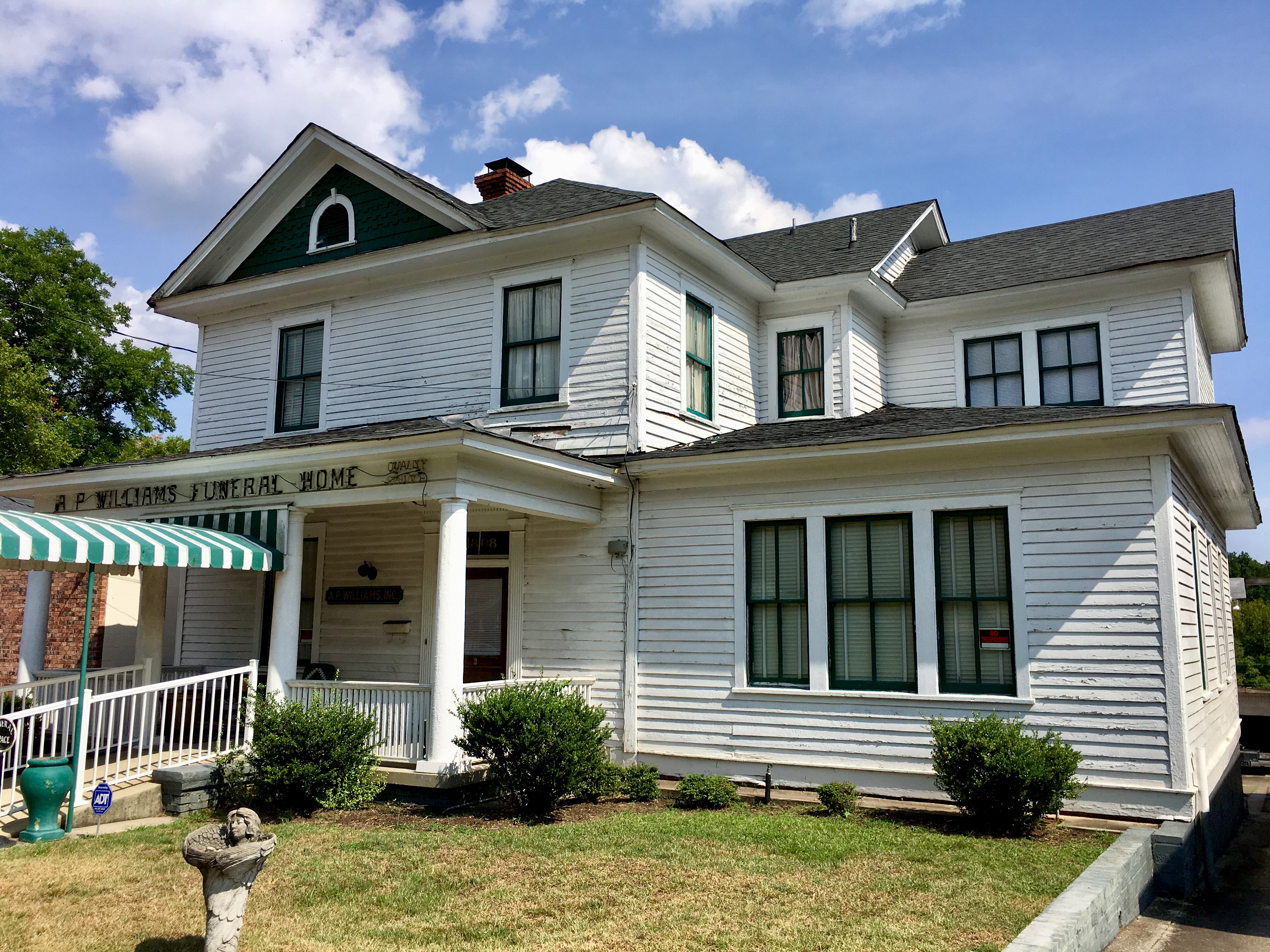

- Location within South Carolina Location within the United States
- Location: 1808 Washington St. Columbia, South Carolina
- Coordinates: 34°0′24″N 81°1′30″W
- Area: less than one acre
- Built: 1893-1911
- Architectural style: Late 19th And 20th Century Revivals
- MPS: Segregation in Columbia, South Carolina MPS
- NRHP reference No.: 05001102
- Added to NRHP: September 28, 2005

A.P. Williams Funeral Home is a historic African-American funeral home located in Columbia, South Carolina. It was built between 1893 and 1911 as a single-family residence, and is a two-story frame building with a hipped roof with gables and a columned porch. At that time, it was one of six funeral homes in the city that served black customers. Archie Preston Williams, II was a leader in the city's black community.

It was added to the National Register of Historic Places in 2005.
