= Point of Pines Plantation Slave Cabin =

- Formerly listed on the U.S. National Register of Historic Places
- Location: Point of Pines Rd., Edisto Island, South Carolina
- NRHP reference No.: 86003213

Significant dates
- Added to NRHP: November 28, 1986
- Removed from NRHP: October 23, 2013

The Point of Pines Plantation Slave Cabin is a slave cabin that was originally located on Point of Pines Plantation in Edisto Island, South Carolina before being donated by the plantation’s owners to be put on display at the National Museum of African American History and Culture.

The two room, hall-and-parlor cabin is a simple, one-story building with a loft. After emancipation the building was enlarged with the addition of a second room on the rear. By 2013, only two slave dwellings remained on Edisto Island including the c. 1851 cabin from Charles Bailey's Point of Pines Plantation. The lumber used for the gable-ended cabin was prepared remotely and then assembled on site. It was listed in the National Register November 28, 1986.

The house was in use as a dwelling until 1981.

In 2010, the house (but not the land) was donated to the Edisto Island Historical Preservation Society. The group raised money and performed stabilization of the house, but the group could not raise enough money to relocate its slave cabin. At the same time, the Smithsonian's National Museum of African American History and Culture was searching for a slave cabin to move to the new museum and bought the Point of Pines example. The museum began the three-week long process of deconstructing the documenting each piece in May 2013. Once removed, the property was delisted from the National Register in October 2013.

== See also ==
- National Register of Historic Places listings in Charleston County, South Carolina
