= Little Africa, South Carolina =

Unincorporated community in South Carolina, U.S.

- Census-designated place
- Interactive map of Little Africa, South Carolina
- Coordinates: 35°10′02″N 81°01′36″W
- Country: United States
- State: South Carolina
- County: Spartanburg
- Time zone: UTC-5
  - Summer (DST): UTC-4 (EDT)

Little Africa is an unincorporated community in Spartanburg County, in the U.S. state of South Carolina.

== History ==
Little Africa was one of a number of independent African American communities formed across the South after the Civil War. Founded c. 1880 by former slave Simpson Foster and a Cherokee Indian, Emanuel Waddell, it was originally 500 acres set aside for their relatives. The early residents were descendants of Simpson Foster and Emanuel Waddell who maintained the tradition of farming and agricultural life in Little Africa for decades. By 1910, family community leaders had built the two-room Africa School to teach local children. One of S.C.'s first Rosenwald Fund schools later opened there. Near the school, family community members built Fairview C.M.E. Church c. 1912, one mile from Highway 9. Congregants first organized themselves c. 1902 at the home of Emanuel Waddell. During Jim Crow and after Brown v Board of Education, new residents as other families settled nearby seeking economic opportunity and refuge from white supremacy. Some of Simpson Foster and Emanuel Waddell's families still reside in Little Africa, after some five generations since the end of slavery in 1865. In 2019, the community received a historical marker.

The Little Africa Park was established by the donation of 8 acres of land by Charlie Proctor, Sr. and Thomas C. Blackley to Spartanburg County Parks and Recreation for the purpose of developing Little Africa Community Park. The park has a playground, a grilling area, and a baseball field.
