= National Register of Historic Places listings in Columbia, South Carolina =

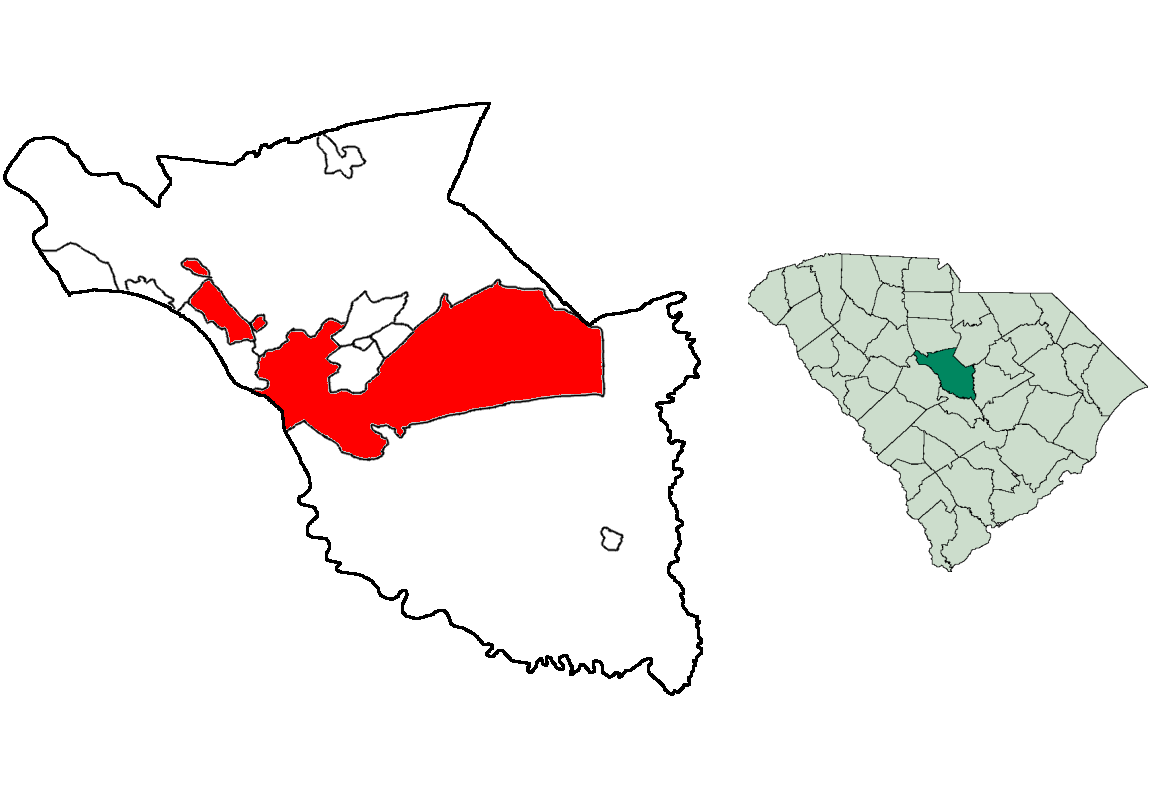
Location of Columbia in South Carolina

This is a list of the National Register of Historic Places listings in Columbia, South Carolina.

This is intended to be a complete list of the properties and districts on the National Register of Historic Places in Columbia, South Carolina, United States. The locations of National Register properties and districts for which the latitude and longitude coordinates are included below, may be seen on a map.

There are 191 properties and districts listed on the National Register in Richland County, including 5 National Historic Landmarks. The city of Columbia is the location of 153 of these properties and districts, including all of the National Historic Landmarks; they are listed here, while the properties and districts in the remaining parts of the county are listed separately. Another 3 properties in Columbia were once listed but have been removed.

This National Park Service list is complete through NPS recent listings posted April 24, 2026.

== Current listings ==
	Name on the Register	Image	Date listed	Location	Description
1	Allen University	Allen University	April 14, 1975 (#75001705)	1530 Harden St. 34°00′38″N 81°01′14″W	
2	Alston House	Alston House	March 2, 1979 (#79003359)	1811 Gervais St. 34°00′16″N 81°01′25″W	
3	Alta Vista-Camp Fornance-Newman Park Historic District	Alta Vista-Camp Fornance-Newman Park Historic District	November 17, 2015 (#15000808)	Bounded by Lakewood Ave., Seaboard Airline RR., Earlewood & Marshall Parks, Northwood, Park, Lindsay & Marlboro Sts. 34°01′23″N 81°02′52″W	
4	Arcade Building	Arcade Building	November 17, 1982 (#82001525)	1332 Main St. 34°00′12″N 81°02′04″W	
5	Arsenal Hill	Arsenal Hill	November 23, 1971 (#71000795)	1800 Lincoln St. 34°00′29″N 81°02′32″W	Palmetto Iron Works and Armory
6	Babcock Building, South Carolina State Hospital	Babcock Building, South Carolina State Hospital	October 30, 1981 (#81000570)	Bull St. 34°00′51″N 81°01′49″W	
7	Bellevue-Newman's Field-Gracelynn Terrace Historic District	Bellevue-Newman's Field-Gracelynn Terrace Historic District	September 30, 1997 (#97001206)	Roughly bounded by Sumter St., Anthony Ave., Bull St., and Elmwood Ave.; also Grace Street; 34°01′09″N 81°02′19″W	A boundary increase and district renaming was approved January 3, 2025.
8	Benedict College Historic District	Benedict College Historic District	April 20, 1987 (#87000809)	Roughly bounded by Laurel, Oak, Taylor, and Harden Sts. on the Benedict College campus 34°00′43″N 81°01′12″W	
9	Florence C. Benson Elementary School	Florence C. Benson Elementary School	October 7, 2009 (#09000819)	226 Bull St. 33°59′25″N 81°01′21″W	
10	Bethel A.M.E. Church	Bethel A.M.E. Church	May 24, 1982 (#82003899)	1528 Sumter St. 34°00′25″N 81°02′03″W	
11	Beverly Apartments	Beverly Apartments	June 29, 2021 (#100006506)	1525 Bull St. 34°00′27″N 81°01′52″W	
12	BROWN'S FERRY VESSEL		May 18, 1979 (#79002391)	Address Restricted	Currently on exhibit at the Rice Museum in Georgetown, South Carolina
13	Building at 1210–1214 Main Street	Building at 1210–1214 Main Street	March 2, 1979 (#79003361)	1210–1214 Main St. 34°00′04″N 81°02′07″W	
14	Building at 1644 Main Street	Building at 1644 Main Street	March 2, 1979 (#79003377)	1644 Main St. 34°00′27″N 81°02′11″W	
15	Building at 1722–1724 Main Street	Building at 1722–1724 Main Street	November 25, 1980 (#80003694)	1722–1724 Main St. 34°00′30″N 81°02′13″W	
16	Building at 303 Saluda Avenue	Building at 303 Saluda Avenue	May 24, 1982 (#82003900)	303 Saluda Ave. 33°59′34″N 81°01′02″W	
17	Caldwell-Hampton-Boylston House	Caldwell-Hampton-Boylston House	May 6, 1971 (#71000796)	829 Richland St. 34°00′32″N 81°02′36″W	
18	John C. Calhoun State Office Building	John C. Calhoun State Office Building	September 23, 2011 (#11000703)	1015 Sumter St. 33°59′57″N 81°01′51″W	
19	Canal Dime Savings Bank	Canal Dime Savings Bank	November 25, 1980 (#80004468)	1530 Main St. 34°00′20″N 81°02′08″W	
20	Carolina Life Insurance Company	Carolina Life Insurance Company	July 11, 2016 (#16000444)	1501 Lady St. 34°00′15″N 81°01′44″W	
21	Carver Theatre	Carver Theatre	July 17, 2003 (#03000658)	1519 Harden St. 34°00′37″N 81°01′18″W	
22	Champion and Pearson Funeral Home	Champion and Pearson Funeral Home	July 17, 2017 (#100001334)	1325 Park St. 34°00′09″N 81°02′17″W	
23	Chapel of Hope	Chapel of Hope	September 18, 2023 (#100008527)	2145 Pickens St. 34°01′02″N 81°02′00″W	
24	Chappelle Administration Building	Chappelle Administration Building	December 8, 1976 (#76001710)	1530 Harden St. 34°00′39″N 81°01′16″W	
25	Chesnut Cottage	Chesnut Cottage	May 6, 1971 (#71000797)	1718 Hampton St. 34°00′27″N 81°01′37″W	
26	Claussen's Bakery	Claussen's Bakery	March 9, 1987 (#87000401)	2001-2003 Green St. 34°00′00″N 81°01′05″W	
27	Colonial Village Apartments		September 24, 2021 (#100006992)	3700 West Ave. 34°02′00″N 81°01′56″W	
28	Columbia Canal	Columbia Canal	January 15, 1979 (#79002392)	Eastern bank of the Broad and Congaree Rivers from the Diversion dam to the Southern railroad bridge 34°00′06″N 81°03′21″W	
29	Columbia Central Fire Station	Columbia Central Fire Station	September 25, 2009 (#08001396)	1001 Senate St. 33°59′58″N 81°02′10″W	
30	Columbia City Hall	Columbia City Hall	June 19, 1973 (#73001725)	Main and Laurel Sts. 34°00′32″N 81°02′15″W	
31	Columbia Commercial Historic District	Columbia Commercial Historic District	October 20, 2014 (#14000875)	Portions of Main, Blanding, Taylor & Sumter Sts.; also 1545 Sumter St., 1611, 1800, 1801, 1813 Main St., 1209 Blanding St. 34°00′27″N 81°02′07″W	Second set of addresses represent a boundary increase approved January 25, 2021
32	Columbia Electric Street Railway, Light & Power Substation	Columbia Electric Street Railway, Light & Power Substation	February 4, 2011 (#10001220)	Main and Laurel Sts. 34°00′09″N 81°02′10″W	
33	Columbia Historic District I	Columbia Historic District I	May 6, 1971 (#71000798)	Roughly bounded by Elmwood, Assembly, Laurel, and Wayne Sts. 34°00′37″N 81°02′13″W	
34	Columbia Historic District II	Columbia Historic District II	May 6, 1971 (#71000799)	Roughly bounded by Taylor, Richland, Pickens, and Barnwell Sts. • Boundary increase (listed June 28, 1982: Blanding, Laurel, Richland, Calhoun, Marion, Bull, Pickens, Henderson, and Barnwell Sts. • Boundary change (listed October 2, 2018: 1328 Blanding St. 34°00′39″N 81°02′01″W	
35	Columbia Mills Building	Columbia Mills Building	May 24, 1982 (#82003902)	On the Congaree River; 33°59′55″N 81°02′53″W	Now houses the South Carolina State Museum
36	Columbia Township Auditorium	Columbia Township Auditorium	September 28, 2005 (#05001104)	1703 Taylor St. 34°00′33″N 81°04′40″W	
37	Confederate Printing Plant	Confederate Printing Plant	March 28, 1979 (#79002393)	501 Gervais St. 33°59′53″N 81°02′41″W	
38	Consolidated Building	Consolidated Building	March 2, 1979 (#79003373)	1326-1330 Main St. 34°00′12″N 81°02′04″W	
39	Cornell Arms	Cornell Arms	January 11, 2019 (#100003305)	1230 Pendleton St. 33°59′55″N 81°01′52″W	
40	Harriet M. Cornwell Tourist House	Harriet M. Cornwell Tourist House	October 5, 2007 (#07001083)	1713 Wayne St. 34°00′27″N 81°02′43″W	
41	Curtiss-Wright Hangar	Curtiss-Wright Hangar	April 30, 1998 (#98000418)	1400 Jim Hamilton Boulevard; 33°58′34″N 81°00′07″W	
42	Debruhl-Marshall House	Debruhl-Marshall House	March 23, 1972 (#72001218)	1401 Laurel St. 34°00′38″N 81°02′02″W	
43	Dovilliers-Manning-Magoffin House	Dovilliers-Manning-Magoffin House	March 2, 1979 (#79003358)	4203 St. Clair Dr. 34°00′34″N 80°58′39″W	
44	Eau Claire Municipal Complex		February 5, 2026 (#100012693)	4001 Monticello Road/945 Jackson Avenue and 4005 Monticello Road; 34°02′23″N 81°02′31″W	
45	Eau Claire Town Hall and Survey Publishing Company Building	Eau Claire Town Hall and Survey Publishing Company Building	March 2, 1979 (#79003371)	3904 Monticello Rd. 34°02′21″N 81°03′08″W	
46	Ebenezer Lutheran Chapel	Ebenezer Lutheran Chapel	March 2, 1979 (#79003365)	1301 Richland St. 34°00′41″N 81°02′09″W	
47	Efird's Department Store	Efird's Department Store	October 9, 2012 (#12000850)	1601 Main St. 34°00′24″N 81°02′10″W	
48	Elmwood Cemetery	Elmwood Cemetery	September 6, 1996 (#96000984)	501 Elmwood Ave. 34°00′50″N 81°03′13″W	
49	Elmwood Park Historic District	Elmwood Park Historic District	May 3, 1991 (#91000529)	Roughly bounded by Elmwood Ave., Main St. and the former Seaboard Air Line railroad tracks • Boundary increase (listed May 13, 2002, refnum 02000477): 2113 Park St. 34°00′49″N 81°02′34″W	
50	Ensor-Keenan House	Ensor-Keenan House	March 2, 1979 (#79003360)	801 Wildwood Ave. 34°02′38″N 81°02′31″W	
51	Dr. Matilda A. Evans House	Dr. Matilda A. Evans House	January 22, 2019 (#100003317)	2027 Taylor St. 34°00′40″N 81°01′20″W	Segregation in Columbia, South Carolina MPS
52	Fair-Rutherford and Rutherford Houses	Fair-Rutherford and Rutherford Houses	April 5, 1984 (#84002093)	1326 and 1330 Gregg St. 34°00′25″N 81°01′24″W	
53	Federal Land Bank Building	Federal Land Bank Building	February 3, 2015 (#14001242)	1401 Hampton St. 34°00′23″N 81°02′02″W	
54	First Baptist Church	First Baptist Church	January 25, 1971 (#71000800)	1306 Hampton St. 34°00′20″N 81°02′00″W	
55	First National Bank	First National Bank	November 25, 1980 (#80003695)	1208 Washington St. 34°00′13″N 81°02′04″W	
56	First Presbyterian Church	First Presbyterian Church	January 25, 1971 (#71000801)	1324 Marion St. 34°00′14″N 81°01′51″W	
57	Five Points Historic District		May 20, 2019 (#100003938)	Harden, Devine, and Greene Sts., Santee and Saluda Aves. 33°59′56″N 81°00′58″W	"Funky urban village"
58	Forest Hills Historic District	Forest Hills Historic District	September 28, 2007 (#07001024)	Bounded by Gervais St., Manning St., Forest Dr., and Glenwood Rd. 34°00′45″N 81°00′12″W	
59	Gervais Street Bridge	Gervais Street Bridge	November 25, 1980 (#80003676)	Spans the Congaree River; 33°59′47″N 81°02′55″W	Extends into West Columbia in Lexington County
60	Good Samaritan-Waverly Hospital	Good Samaritan-Waverly Hospital	July 28, 2008 (#08000738)	2204 Hampton St. 34°00′37″N 81°01′08″W	
61	Granby Mill Village Historic District	Granby Mill Village Historic District	September 20, 1993 (#93000905)	Roughly bounded by Catawba, Gist, Heyward, and Church Sts. 33°58′59″N 81°02′22″W	
62	Greyhound Bus Depot	Greyhound Bus Depot	December 28, 1989 (#82005383)	1200 Blanding St. 34°00′29″N 81°02′08″W	
63	Hale-Elmore-Seibels House	Hale-Elmore-Seibels House	May 6, 1971 (#71000804)	1601 Richland St. 34°00′46″N 81°01′53″W	
64	Ainsley Hall House	Ainsley Hall House	July 16, 1970 (#70000595)	1616 Blanding St. 34°00′34″N 81°01′45″W	Robert Mills House
65	Hampton-Preston House	Hampton-Preston House	July 29, 1969 (#69000172)	1615 Blanding St. 34°00′37″N 81°01′46″W	
66	Harden Street Substation	Harden Street Substation	September 28, 2005 (#05001103)	1901 Harden St. 34°00′53″N 81°01′25″W	
67	Heslep House	Heslep House	March 2, 1979 (#79003378)	203 Saluda Ave. 33°59′31″N 81°01′00″W	
68	Holman's Barber Shop	Holman's Barber Shop	September 10, 2021 (#100006884)	2128 Gervais St. 34°00′22″N 81°01′04″W	
69	Horry-Guignard House	Horry-Guignard House	May 6, 1971 (#71000802)	1527 Senate St. 34°00′06″N 81°01′38″W	
70	House of Peace Synagogue	House of Peace Synagogue	August 28, 1979 (#79003354)	Hampton and Park Sts. 34°00′15″N 81°02′18″W	Also known as the Big Apple Club.
71	B.B. Kirkland Seed and Distributing Company	B.B. Kirkland Seed and Distributing Company	March 2, 1979 (#79003370)	912 Lady St. 34°00′03″N 81°02′18″W	
72	Kress Building	Kress Building	March 2, 1979 (#79003376)	1508 Main St. 34°00′20″N 81°02′08″W	
73	Lace House	Lace House	December 17, 1969 (#69000173)	803 Richland St. 34°00′31″N 81°02′39″W	
74	Ladson Presbyterian Church	Ladson Presbyterian Church	April 30, 1998 (#98000419)	1720 Sumter St. 34°00′33″N 81°02′07″W	
75	Leevy's Funeral Home	Leevy's Funeral Home	January 14, 2021 (#100006020)	1831 Taylor St. 34°00′36″N 81°01′30″W	
76	Lever Building	Lever Building	March 2, 1979 (#79003372)	1613 Main St. 34°00′24″N 81°02′12″W	
77	Logan School	Logan School	March 2, 1979 (#79003367)	815 Elmwood Ave. 34°00′43″N 81°02′42″W	
78	Preston C. Lorick House	Preston C. Lorick House	February 23, 1972 (#72001219)	1727 Hampton St. 34°00′29″N 81°01′35″W	
79	Lutheran Theological Seminary Building: Beam Dormitory	Lutheran Theological Seminary Building: Beam Dormitory	August 28, 1979 (#79003353)	4201 Main St. 34°02′32″N 81°02′04″W	
80	Lyles-Gudmundson House	Lyles-Gudmundson House	March 2, 1979 (#79003364)	Address Restricted; 33°59′32″N 81°00′55″W	
81	Mann-Simons Cottage	Mann-Simons Cottage	April 23, 1973 (#73001726)	1403 Richland St. 34°00′42″N 81°02′04″W	
82	McCord House	McCord House	March 2, 1979 (#79003357)	1431 Pendleton St. 33°59′59″N 81°01′41″W	
83	McMaster School	McMaster School	July 25, 1997 (#97000777)	1106 Pickens St. 34°00′08″N 81°01′34″W	
84	Melrose Heights-Oak Lawn-Fairview Historic District	Melrose Heights-Oak Lawn-Fairview Historic District	November 2, 2016 (#16000756)	Bounded by Butler and Princeton Sts., Maiden Ln., Michigan St. and Millwood Ave., Woodrow and King Sts., Kirby St., Trenholm Rd. 34°00′19″N 80°59′48″W	
85	Middleburg Park Historic District		May 15, 2025 (#100011845)	Middleburg Drive. St. Julian Place, Summit Place. and portions of Devonshire Drive and Forest Drive; 34°00′57″N 81°00′07″W	
86	Miller Brothers Cotton Warehouse	Miller Brothers Cotton Warehouse	May 3, 2016 (#16000227)	705 Gervais St. 33°59′57″N 81°02′28″W	
87	Millwood	Millwood	March 18, 1971 (#71000803)	East of Columbia on Garner's Ferry Rd. 33°59′16″N 80°57′45″W	Home of Wade Hampton II.
88	Moore-Mann House	Moore-Mann House	March 2, 1979 (#79003363)	1611 Hampton St. 34°00′27″N 81°01′43″W	
89	National Loan and Exchange Bank Building	National Loan and Exchange Bank Building	March 2, 1979 (#79003374)	1338 Main St. 34°00′13″N 81°02′05″W	
90	Nipper Creek (38RD18)		December 24, 1986 (#86003474)	Address Restricted	
91	North Carolina Mutual Building	North Carolina Mutual Building	January 20, 1995 (#94001570)	1001, 1001½, and 1003 Washington St. 34°00′10″N 81°02′17″W	
92	North Columbia Fire Station No. 7	North Columbia Fire Station No. 7	June 1, 2005 (#05000518)	2622 N. Main St. 34°01′14″N 81°02′32″W	
93	Old Campus District, University of South Carolina	Old Campus District, University of South Carolina	June 5, 1970 (#70000596)	Bounded by Pendleton, Sumter, Pickens, and Green Sts. 33°59′47″N 81°01′43″W	
94	Old Shandon Historic District	Old Shandon Historic District	September 2, 2003 (#03000887)	Roughly bounded by Cypress, Lee, Maple, Preston, and Woodrow St. 34°00′04″N 81°00′15″W	
95	Olympia Mill	Olympia Mill	February 2, 2005 (#04001590)	500 Heyward St. 33°58′58″N 81°02′11″W	
96	Olympia Mill School	Olympia Mill School	May 29, 2018 (#100002527)	1170 Olympia Ave; 33°58′44″N 81°01′41″W	
97	Olympia Union Hall	Olympia Union Hall	January 24, 2017 (#100000571)	119 S. Parker St. 33°59′00″N 81°02′02″W	
98	Owen Building	Owen Building	June 14, 2013 (#13000398)	1321 Lady St. 34°00′14″N 81°01′54″W	
99	Pacific Community Association Building	Pacific Community Association Building	October 24, 2007 (#07001110)	701 Whaley St. and 214 Wayne St. 33°59′08″N 81°02′07″W	
100	Palmetto Building	Palmetto Building	November 25, 1980 (#80003696)	1400 Main St. 34°00′14″N 81°02′05″W	
101	Palmetto Compress and Warehouse Company Building	Palmetto Compress and Warehouse Company Building	October 17, 1985 (#85003237)	617 Devine St. 33°59′29″N 81°02′20″W	[The building now serves as residential lofts
102	J. Davis Powell House	J. Davis Powell House	September 25, 2012 (#12000823)	1410 Shirley St. 34°00′26″N 80°59′52″W	
103	George R. Price House	George R. Price House	April 30, 1998 (#98000417)	3000 Forest Dr. 34°00′54″N 80°59′54″W	
104	Raymond Price House	Raymond Price House	September 27, 2007 (#07001022)	3004 Forest Dr. 34°00′55″N 80°59′52″W	
105	Randolph Cemetery	Randolph Cemetery	January 20, 1995 (#94001573)	Western terminus of Elmwood Ave. 34°00′34″N 81°03′15″W	
106	Richland Cotton Mill	Richland Cotton Mill	November 10, 1983 (#83003933)	211-221 Main St. 33°59′18″N 81°01′43″W	
107	Richland County Health Center		September 24, 2025 (#100012269)	1221 Gregg Street; 34°00′21″N 81°01′22″W	
108	Romer Building		February 5, 2026 (#100012694)	1710 Gervais Street; 34°00′14″N 81°01′29″W	
109	Bob Russell Realty Building		December 30, 2024 (#100011213)	1931 Assembly Street and 1022 Calhoun Street; 34°00′41″N 81°02′24″W	
110	Ruth's Beauty Parlor		October 5, 2020 (#100005638)	1221 Pine St. 34°00′26″N 81°01′04″W	
111	St. Peter's Roman Catholic Church	St. Peter's Roman Catholic Church	September 28, 1989 (#89001610)	1529 Assembly St. 34°00′19″N 81°02′17″W	
112	Saluda Apartments	Saluda Apartments	September 24, 2021 (#100006993)	511-537 Saluda Ave. 33°59′44″N 81°01′08″W	
113	Sidney Park Colored Methodist Episcopal Church	Sidney Park Colored Methodist Episcopal Church	October 24, 1996 (#96001222)	1114 Blanding St. 34°00′26″N 81°02′15″W	
114	Modjeska Monteith Simkins House	Modjeska Monteith Simkins House	March 25, 1994 (#94000263)	2025 Marion St. 34°00′49″N 81°02′09″W	
115	South Carolina Archives Building	South Carolina Archives Building	October 8, 2024 (#100010909)	1430 Senate Street; 34°00′04″N 81°01′42″W	
116	South Carolina Governor's Mansion	South Carolina Governor's Mansion	June 5, 1970 (#70000597)	800 Richland St. 34°00′28″N 81°02′37″W	
117	South Carolina Memorial Garden	South Carolina Memorial Garden	April 2, 2012 (#09000464)	1919 Lincoln St., 34°00′33″N 81°02′36″W	
118	South Carolina State Armory	South Carolina State Armory	February 5, 1999 (#99000099)	1219 Assembly St. 34°00′05″N 81°02′10″W	
119	South Carolina State Hospital, Mills Building	South Carolina State Hospital, Mills Building	June 5, 1970 (#70000890)	2100 Bull St. 34°00′52″N 81°02′00″W	
120	South Carolina Statehouse	South Carolina Statehouse	June 5, 1970 (#70000598)	Main St. 34°00′01″N 81°01′59″W	
121	South Carolina State Library	South Carolina State Library	October 11, 2022 (#100008259)	1500 Senate St. 34°00′04″N 81°01′39″W	
122	Southern Cotton Oil Company	Southern Cotton Oil Company	July 25, 1996 (#94001552)	737 Gadsden St. 33°59′34″N 81°02′16″W	
123	Dr. Cyril O. Spann Medical Office	Dr. Cyril O. Spann Medical Office	May 20, 2019 (#100003939)	2226 Hampton St. 34°00′38″N 81°01′06″W	
124	A. Fletcher Spigner House	A. Fletcher Spigner House	December 11, 2009 (#09001107)	2028 Wheat St. 33°59′45″N 81°00′54″W	
125	Stone Manufacturing Company		September 25, 2020 (#100005610)	3452 North Main St. 34°01′52″N 81°02′32″W	
126	Supreme Court of South Carolina Building	Supreme Court of South Carolina Building	October 18, 1972 (#72001220)	Northwestern corner of the junction of Gervais and Sumter Sts. 34°00′06″N 81°01′57″W	
127	Sylvan Building	Sylvan Building	March 23, 1972 (#72001221)	1500 Main St. 34°00′18″N 81°02′07″W	
128	Taylor House	Taylor House	July 6, 1982 (#82003903)	1505 Senate St. 34°00′05″N 81°01′41″W	
129	Strom Thurmond Federal Building and U.S. Courthouse	Strom Thurmond Federal Building and U.S. Courthouse	September 10, 2014 (#14000599)	1835-1845 Assembly St. 34°00′59″N 80°56′18″W	
130	Town Theatre	Town Theatre	October 9, 1974 (#74001873)	1012 Sumter St. 34°00′00″N 81°01′51″W	
131	Trinity Episcopal Church	Trinity Episcopal Church	February 24, 1971 (#71000805)	1100 Sumter St. 34°00′03″N 81°01′52″W	
132	Union National Bank Building	Union National Bank Building	January 14, 2019 (#100003307)	1200 Main St. 34°00′05″N 81°02′00″W	
133	Union Station	Union Station	June 19, 1973 (#73001728)	401 S. Main St. 33°59′25″N 81°01′46″W	
134	University Neighborhood Historic District	University Neighborhood Historic District	October 13, 2004 (#04001150)	Roughly bounded by Gervais St., the Southern railroad cut, Greene St., and Pickens St. 34°00′03″N 81°01′19″W	
135	US Courthouse	US Courthouse	March 2, 1979 (#79003375)	1100 Laurel St. 34°00′31″N 81°02′17″W	
136	Veterans Administration Regional Office		September 25, 2020 (#100005611)	1801 Assembly St. 34°00′32″N 81°02′21″W	
137	Veterans Hospital	Veterans Hospital	September 2, 2009 (#09000062)	William Jennings Bryan Dorn Veterans Affairs Medical Center, University of South Carolina School of Medicine; 33°58′39″N 80°57′40″W	
138	Wade Hampton State Office Building	Wade Hampton State Office Building	March 7, 2007 (#07000126)	1015 Sumter St. 34°00′05″N 81°01′56″W	
139	Wallace-McGee House	Wallace-McGee House	March 2, 1979 (#79003379)	415 Harden St. 33°59′43″N 81°00′53″W	
140	Wardlaw Junior High School	Wardlaw Junior High School	September 13, 1984 (#84002096)	1003 Elmwood Ave. 34°00′45″N 81°02′33″W	
141	Washington Street United Methodist Church	Washington Street United Methodist Church	December 18, 1970 (#70000599)	1401 Washington St. 34°00′19″N 81°01′53″W	
142	Booker T. Washington High School Auditorium	Booker T. Washington High School Auditorium	October 24, 2018 (#100003059)	1400 Wheat St. 33°59′35″N 81°01′31″W	
143	Waverly Historic District	Waverly Historic District	December 21, 1989 (#89002154)	Roughly bounded by Hampton St., Heidt St., Gervais St., and Harden St. 34°00′33″N 81°01′03″W	
144	Wesley Methodist Church	Wesley Methodist Church	January 29, 2009 (#08001398)	1727 Gervais St. 34°00′15″N 81°01′28″W	
145	West Gervais Street Historic District		April 27, 1983 (#83002206)	Roughly bounded by Gadsen, Senate, Park, and Lady Sts. 33°59′56″N 81°02′21″W	
146	W. B. Smith Whaley House	W. B. Smith Whaley House	March 2, 1979 (#79003362)	1527 Gervais St. 34°00′11″N 81°01′40″W	
147	A.P. Williams Funeral Home	A.P. Williams Funeral Home	September 28, 2005 (#05001102)	1808 Washington St. 34°00′24″N 81°01′30″W	
148	Thomas Woodrow Wilson Boyhood Home	Thomas Woodrow Wilson Boyhood Home	February 23, 1972 (#72001222)	1705 Hampton St. 34°00′29″N 81°01′38″W	
149	Woodrow Memorial Presbyterian Church	Woodrow Memorial Presbyterian Church	March 2, 1979 (#79003366)	2221 Washington St. 34°00′34″N 81°01′05″W	
150	World War Memorial Building	World War Memorial Building	May 26, 1995 (#95000637)	920 Sumter St., at its junction with Pendleton St. 33°59′55″N 81°01′48″W	
151	Zimmerman House	Zimmerman House	March 2, 1979 (#79003355)	1332 Pickens St. 34°00′19″N 81°01′41″W	
152	Zimmerman School	Zimmerman School	March 2, 1979 (#79003356)	1336 Pickens St. 34°00′21″N 81°01′41″W	
153	Zion Baptist Church	Zion Baptist Church	September 24, 2021 (#100006996)	801 Washington St. 34°00′07″N 81°02′28″W	

== Former listings ==
	Name on the Register	Image	Date listed	Date removed	Location	Description
1	Columbia High School	Columbia High School	March 2, 1979 (#79003368)	December 18, 1989	1323 Washington Street	Demolished in 1984
2	South Carolina Penitentiary	South Carolina Penitentiary	January 4, 1996 (#95001489)	December 8, 2005	1511 Williams Street; 34°00′09″N 81°03′04″W	Demolished
3	South Carolina Dispensary Office Building	South Carolina Dispensary Office Building	March 2, 1979 (#79003369)	December 18, 1989	1205 Pulaski Street	Severely damaged by Tropical Storm Chris on August 28, 1988.

== See also ==
- List of National Historic Landmarks in South Carolina
- National Register of Historic Places listings in South Carolina
