= Miller Brothers Cotton Warehouse =

- U.S. National Register of Historic Places
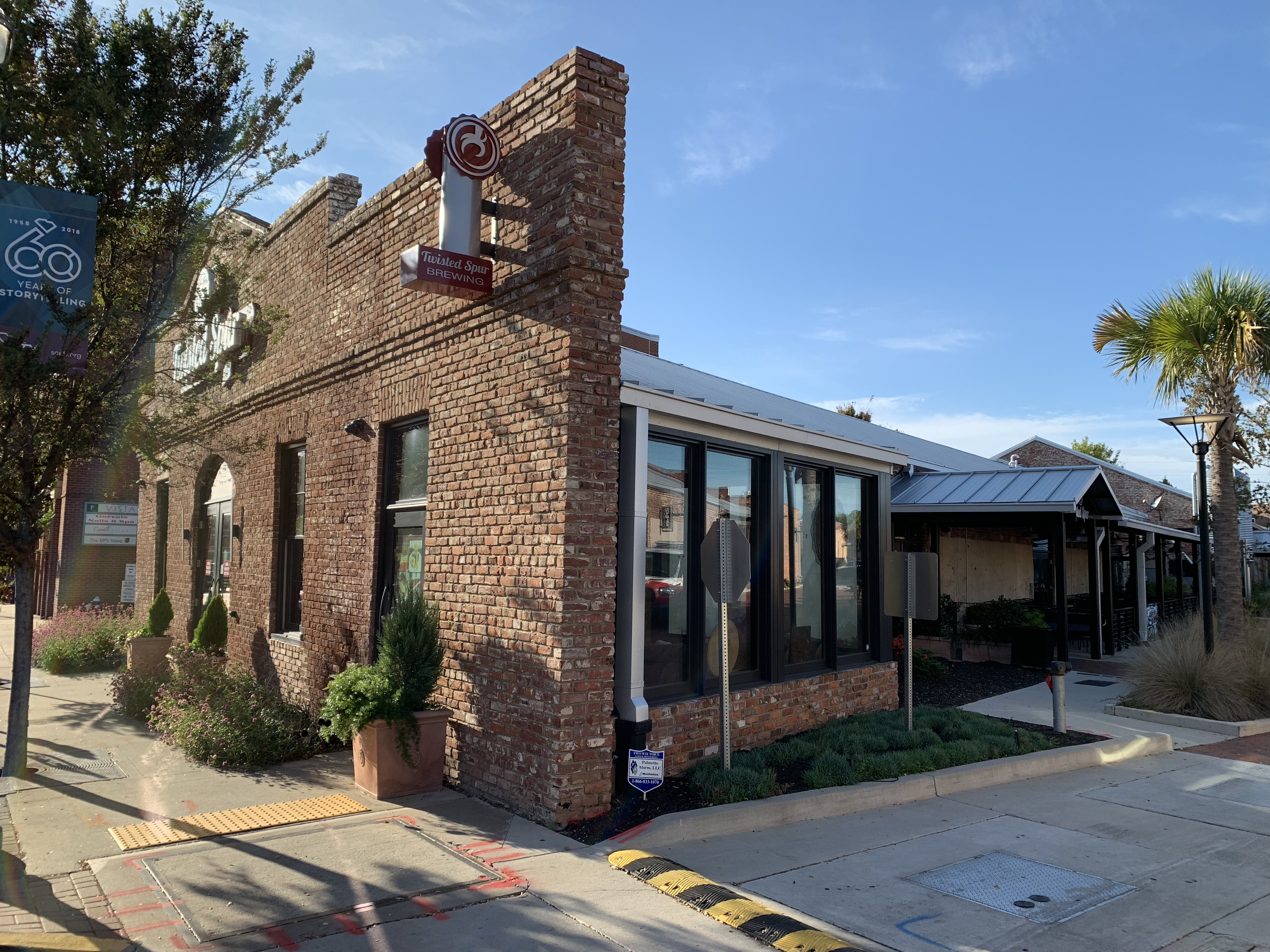

- Location within South Carolina Location within the United States
- Location: 705 Gervais St. Columbia, South Carolina
- Coordinates: 33°59′57″N 81°2′28″W
- Area: 4 acres (1.6 ha)
- Built: 1872
- NRHP reference No.: 16000227
- Added to NRHP: May 3, 2016

The Miller Brothers Cotton Warehouse is a historic cotton warehouse at 705 Gervais St. in Columbia, South Carolina. It is a low-profile single-story brick building, set at an angle to the street, in a city district historically occupied by many similar buildings. Built in 1872, its orientation is due to the presence of railroad tracks (no longer extant) on either side of the parcel. Its first major owners were the Miller Brothers, dealers in cotton; it has been used to house foodstuffs and electrical equipment in its long history of use.

The building was added to the National Register of Historic Places in 2016.

== See also ==
- National Register of Historic Places listings in Columbia, South Carolina
