= Carolina Life Insurance Company =

- U.S. National Register of Historic Places
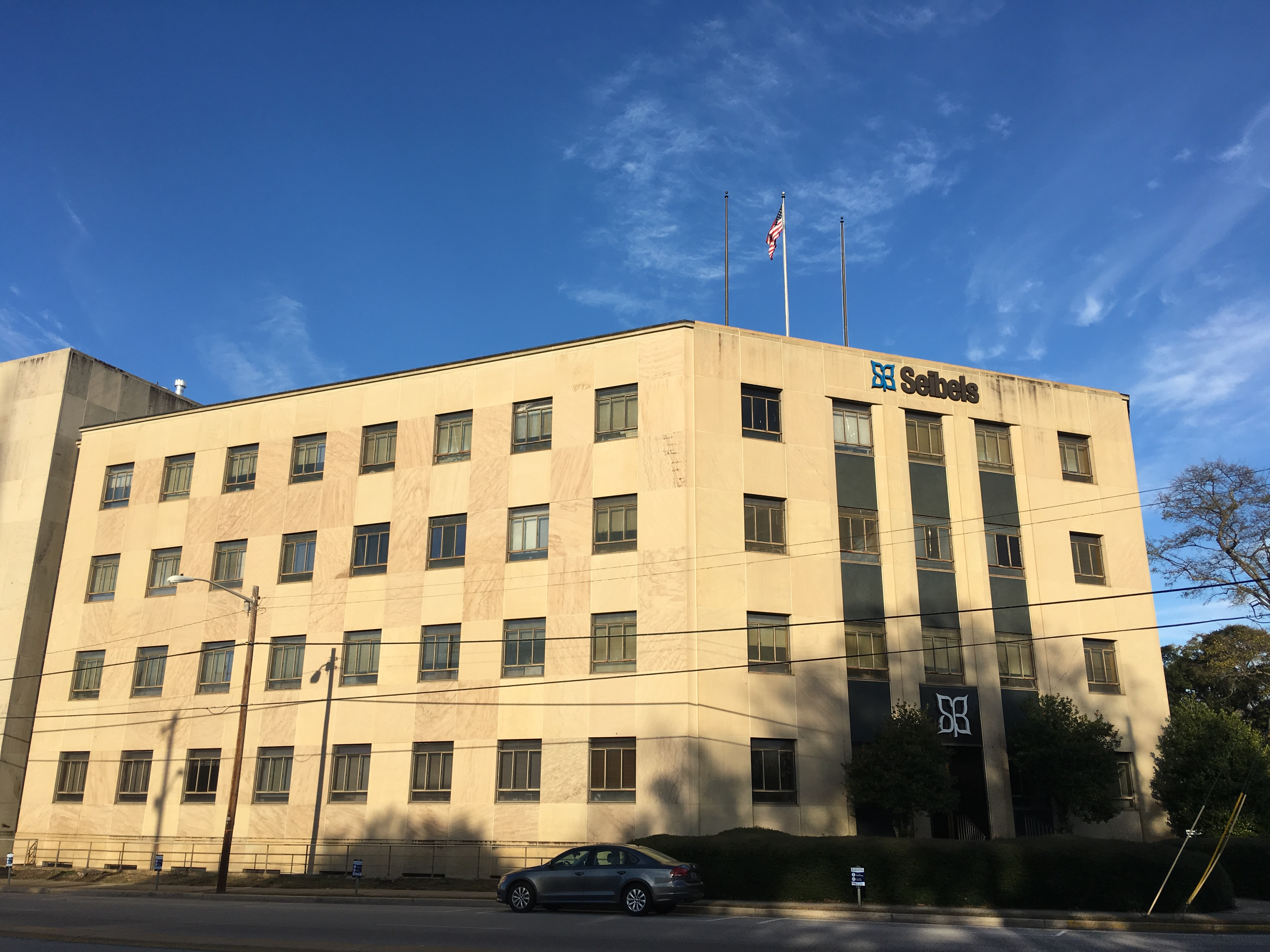
- Photo, January 2017

- Location within South Carolina Location within the United States
- Location: 1501 Lady St., Columbia, South Carolina
- Coordinates: 34°0′15″N 81°1′44″W
- Area: 0.3 acres (0.12 ha)
- Built: 1949
- Architect: Lafaye, Lafaye & Fair
- Architectural style: Modern
- NRHP reference No.: 16000444
- Added to NRHP: July 11, 2016

The Carolina Life Insurance Company is a historic commercial building at 1501 Lady Street in Columbia, South Carolina, alternatively known as Seibels, Bruce & Company Building. It is a five-story masonry structure, finished primarily in limestone with granite trim. It presents an angled five-bay facade to the junction of Lady and Bull Streets, and is presently known as the Seibels Building. It was built in 1949 and enlarged in 1977; its original design by the local firm of Lafaye, Lafaye & Fair was a major contribution to the city's modern architecture. The Carolina Life Insurance Company only occupied the building until the early 1960s, when it was merged into another insurance company. From 1965 to 2024 it was home to Seibels, Bruce & Company, another insurer.

The building was added to the National Register of Historic Places in 2016.

== See also ==
- National Register of Historic Places listings in Columbia, South Carolina
