= Alta Vista–Camp Fornance–Newman Park Historic District =

Historic district in South Carolina, United States

- U.S. National Register of Historic Places
- U.S. Historic district
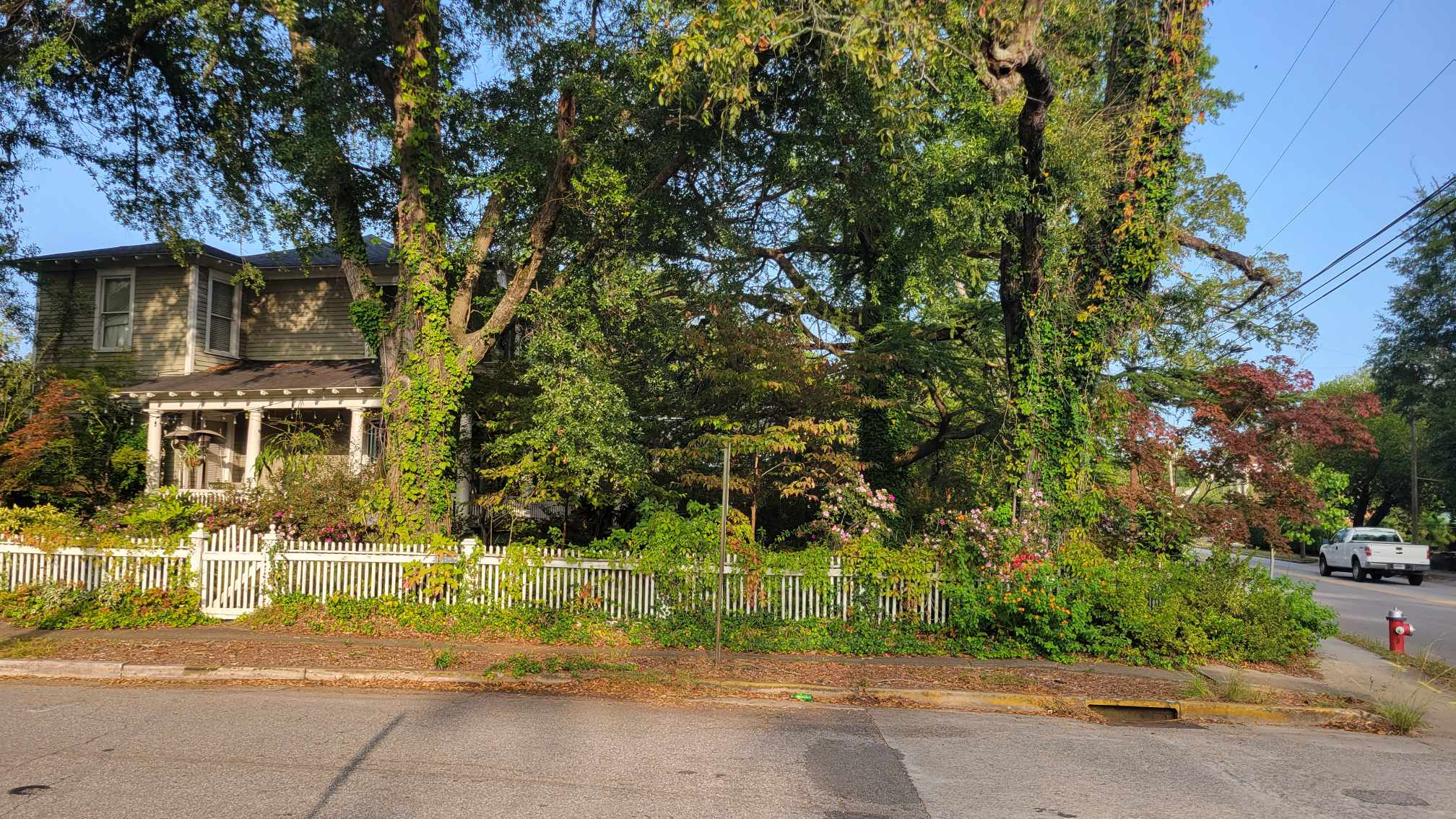

- Location within South Carolina Location within the United States
- Location: Bounded by Lakewood Ave., Seaboard Airline RR., Earlewood & Marshall Parks, Northwood, Park, Lindsay & Marlboro Sts., Columbia, South Carolina
- Coordinates: 34°01′23″N 81°02′52″W
- Area: 225 acres (91 ha)
- Built: 1906
- NRHP reference No.: 15000808
- Added to NRHP: November 17, 2015

The Alta Vista–Camp Fornance–Newman Park Historic District is a predominantly residential historic district in northwestern Columbia, South Carolina. It encompasses much of the neighborhood of Earlewood, and is formed out of three separate subdivisions that were developed as streetcar suburbs in the early 20th century. The district is about 225 acres (91 ha) in size, and has more than 550 residences, many in architectural styles popular in the first half of the 20th century. It is roughly bounded on the east and south by the tracks of the Seaboard Air Line, the north by Earlewood Park and Lakewood Avenue, and the northwest by Darlington Avenue.

The district was added to the National Register of Historic Places in 2015.

== See also ==
- National Register of Historic Places listings in Columbia, South Carolina
