= Champion and Pearson Funeral Home =

Historic building in South Carolina, US

- U.S. National Register of Historic Places
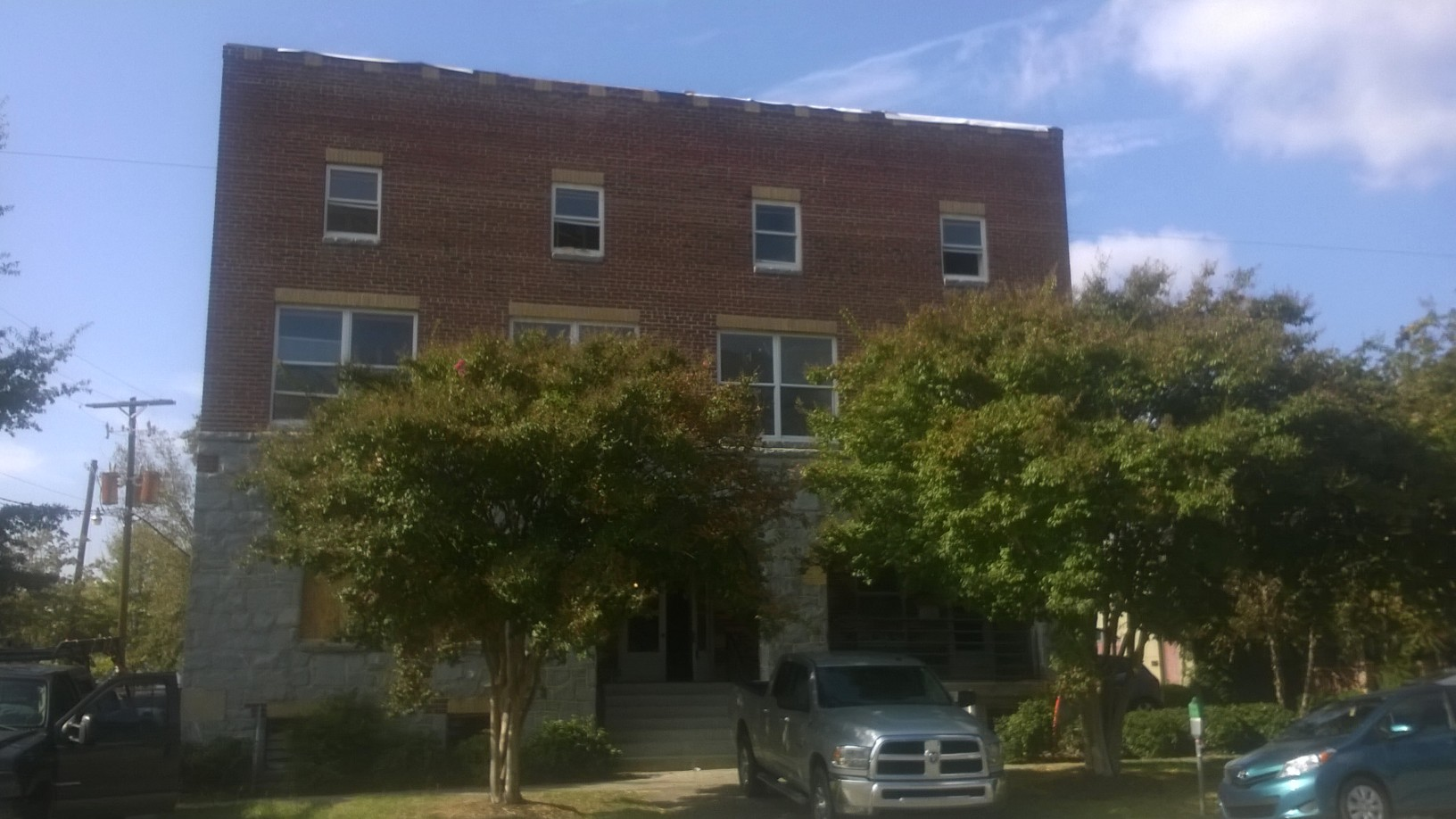

- Location within South Carolina Location within the United States
- Location: 1325 Park St., Columbia, South Carolina
- Coordinates: 34°0′9″N 81°2′17″W
- Built: 1929
- NRHP reference No.: 100001334
- Added to NRHP: July 17, 2017

The Champion and Pearson Funeral Home is a historic commercial building at 1325 Park Street in Columbia, South Carolina. Built in 1929, it is an architecturally eclectic landmark in an area that was traditionally a center of African-American economic activity in the city. It was built by the Pearson family to serve as a funeral parlor and residence for the family, during the height of the Jim Crow era. The property was used as a funeral home until 1966.

The building was added to the National Register of Historic Places in 2017.

== See also ==
- National Register of Historic Places listings in Columbia, South Carolina
