= Brown's Ferry vessel =

- BROWN'S FERRY VESSEL
- U.S. National Register of Historic Places
- Location within South Carolina Location within the United States
- Nearest city: Columbia, South Carolina
- Coordinates: 33°21′56″N 79°16′57″W
- Area: 0.1 acres (0.040 ha)
- Built: 1735
- Architectural style: Merchant Vessel
- NRHP reference No.: 79002391
- Added to NRHP: May 18, 1979

The Brown's Ferry vessel is a shipwrecked colonial vessel. Based on an analysis of artifacts found on the wreck, it sank sometime between 1730 and 1740 in the Black River, near a place known as Brown's Ferry, which is in the general vicinity of Georgetown, South Carolina. The ship was apparently a merchant cargo vessel, and was not obviously associated with the ferry operation. At the time of its discovery, the wrecked vessel was judged to provide a unique view into the shipbuilding industry of the southern British colonies of North America. The ship was more than 50 feet (15 m) in length and 14 feet (4.3 m) wide. It had a 3-foot (0.91 m) hold, a draft of 2'10", and an estimated capacity of 30 tons. It was built of oak, pine, and cypress planking. She had a flat bottom and no keel. When she sank her principal cargo was a load of bricks.

The vessel was excavated and raised in 1976, and was listed on the National Register of Historic Places in 1979. It is now on display at the Rice Museum in Georgetown.

== See also ==
- National Register of Historic Places listings in Columbia, South Carolina
