= University Neighborhood Historic District (Columbia, South Carolina) =

Historic district in South Carolina, United States

- U.S. National Register of Historic Places
- U.S. Historic district
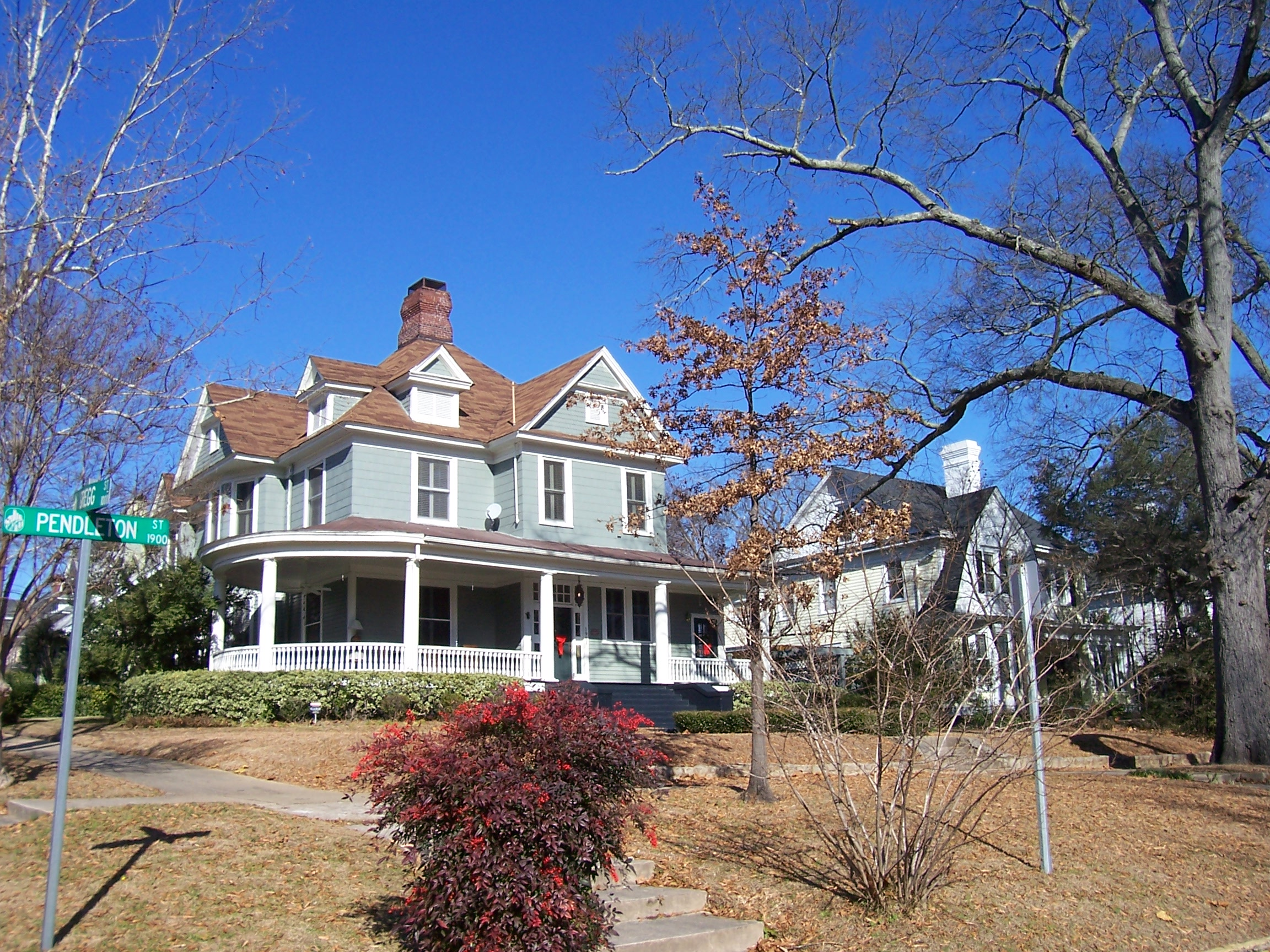
- Otis House, 1901 Pendleton St., a contributing property in the district

- Location within South Carolina Location within the United States
- Location: Roughly bounded by Gervais St., the Southern Railroad Cut, Greene St. and Pickens St., Columbia, South Carolina
- Coordinates: 34°0′3″N 81°1′19″W
- Architect: Carter, Avery; et al.
- Architectural style: Late Victorian, Late 19th And 20th Century Revivals
- NRHP reference No.: 04001150
- Added to NRHP: October 13, 2004

The University Neighborhood Historic District is roughly bounded by Gervais St., the Southern Railroad Cut, Greene St. and Pickens St. in the University Hill neighborhood of Columbia, South Carolina. The district is significant for its architecture, including Late Victorian, Late 19th And 20th Century Revival styles. It was added to the National Register of Historic Places in 2004.

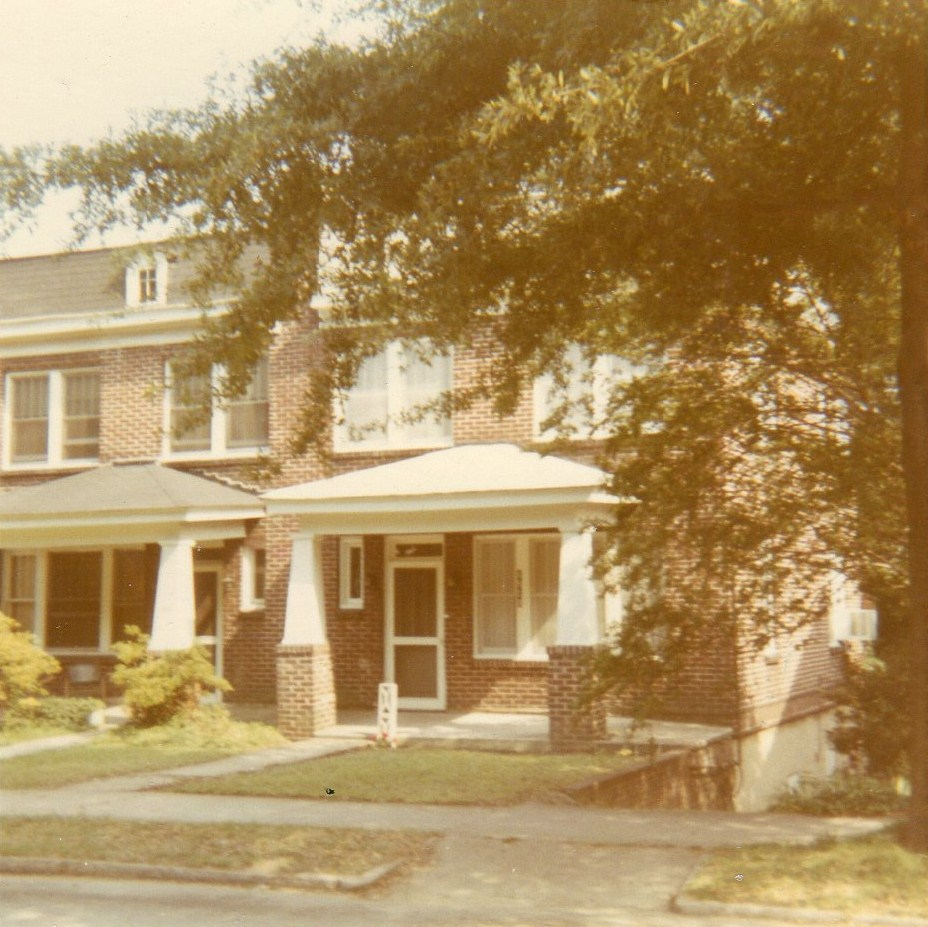
1810-1812 Greene Street in 1969, typical of the 1930s townhouses on the street
