= First National Bank (Columbia, South Carolina) =

- U.S. National Register of Historic Places
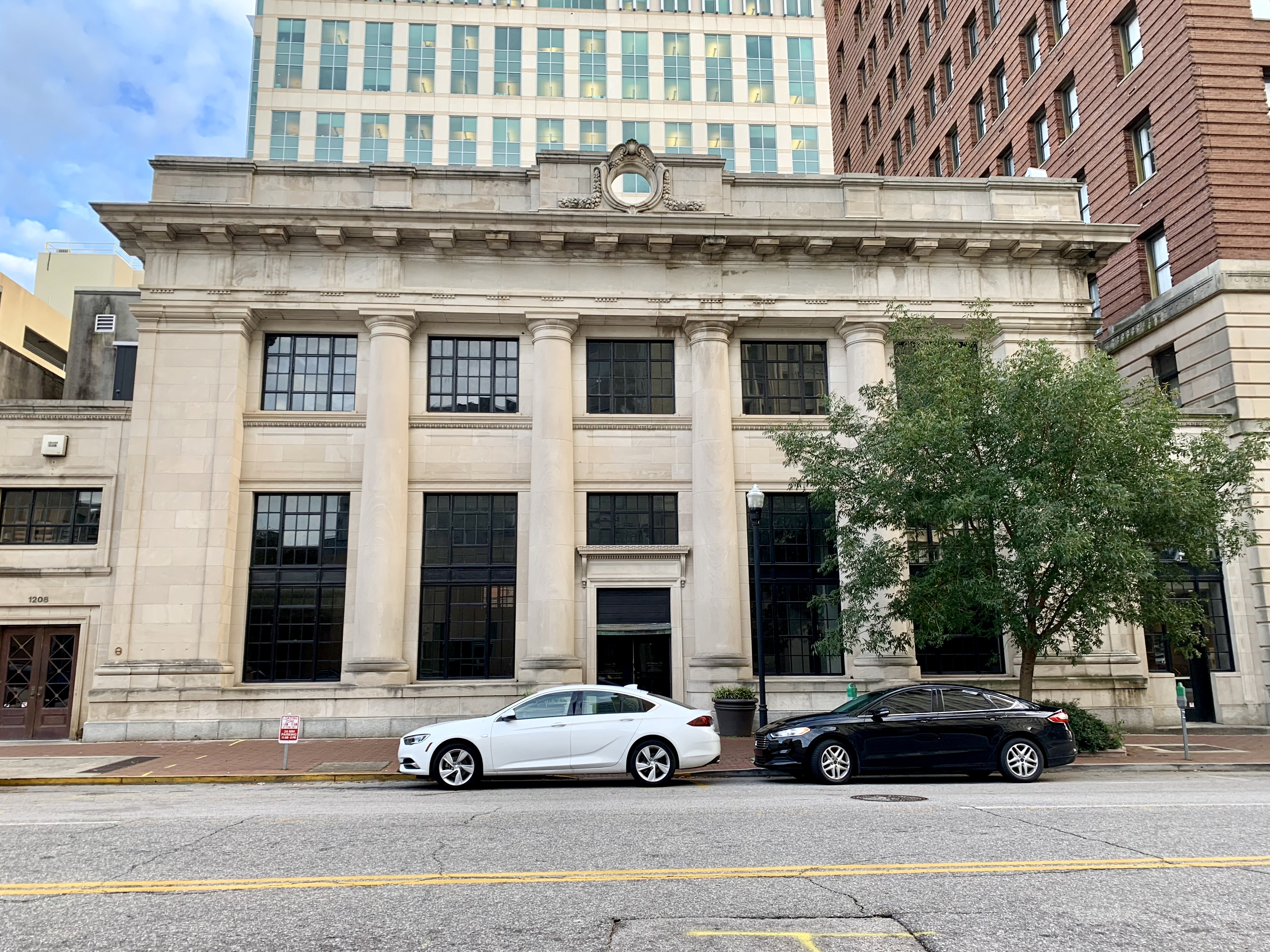

- Location within South Carolina Location within the United States
- Location: 1208 Washington St. Columbia, South Carolina
- Coordinates: 34°0′13″N 81°2′4″W
- Area: 0.2 acres (0.081 ha)
- Built: c. 1924
- Architectural style: Classical Revival
- MPS: Columbia MRA
- NRHP reference No.: 80003695
- Added to NRHP: November 25, 1980

First National Bank, also known as the National Loan and Exchange Bank Addition, is a historic bank building located at Columbia, South Carolina. It was built about 1924, and is a two-story, stone faced Neoclassical style building consisting of a two-story central section with flanking one-story wings. The front façade features four monumental 3/4 detached Doric order columns.

It was added to the National Register of Historic Places in 1980.
