= Federal Land Bank Building =

Bank in Columbia, South Carolina

- U.S. National Register of Historic Places
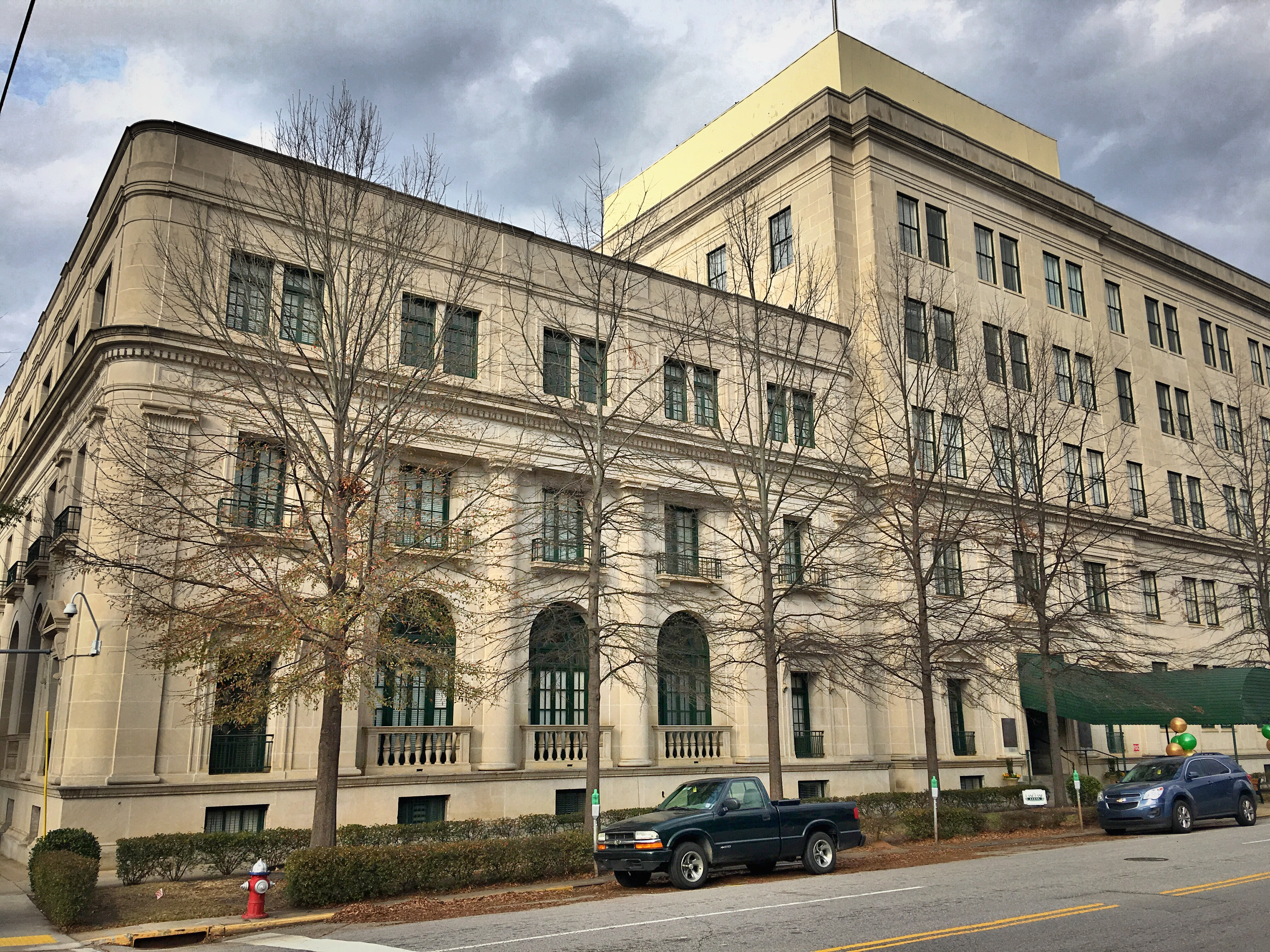

- Location within South Carolina Location within the United States
- Location: 1401 Hampton St., Columbia, South Carolina
- Coordinates: 34°00′23″N 81°02′02″W
- Area: 1.64 acres (0.66 ha)
- Built: 1924
- Architect: A. Ten Eyck Brown
- Architectural style: Classical Revival
- Website: https://www.liveatlandbanklofts.com/
- NRHP reference No.: 14001242
- Added to NRHP: February 3, 2015

The Federal Land Bank Building, built in 1924, is a bank in Columbia, South Carolina, United States. It was designed by architect A. Ten Eyck Brown.

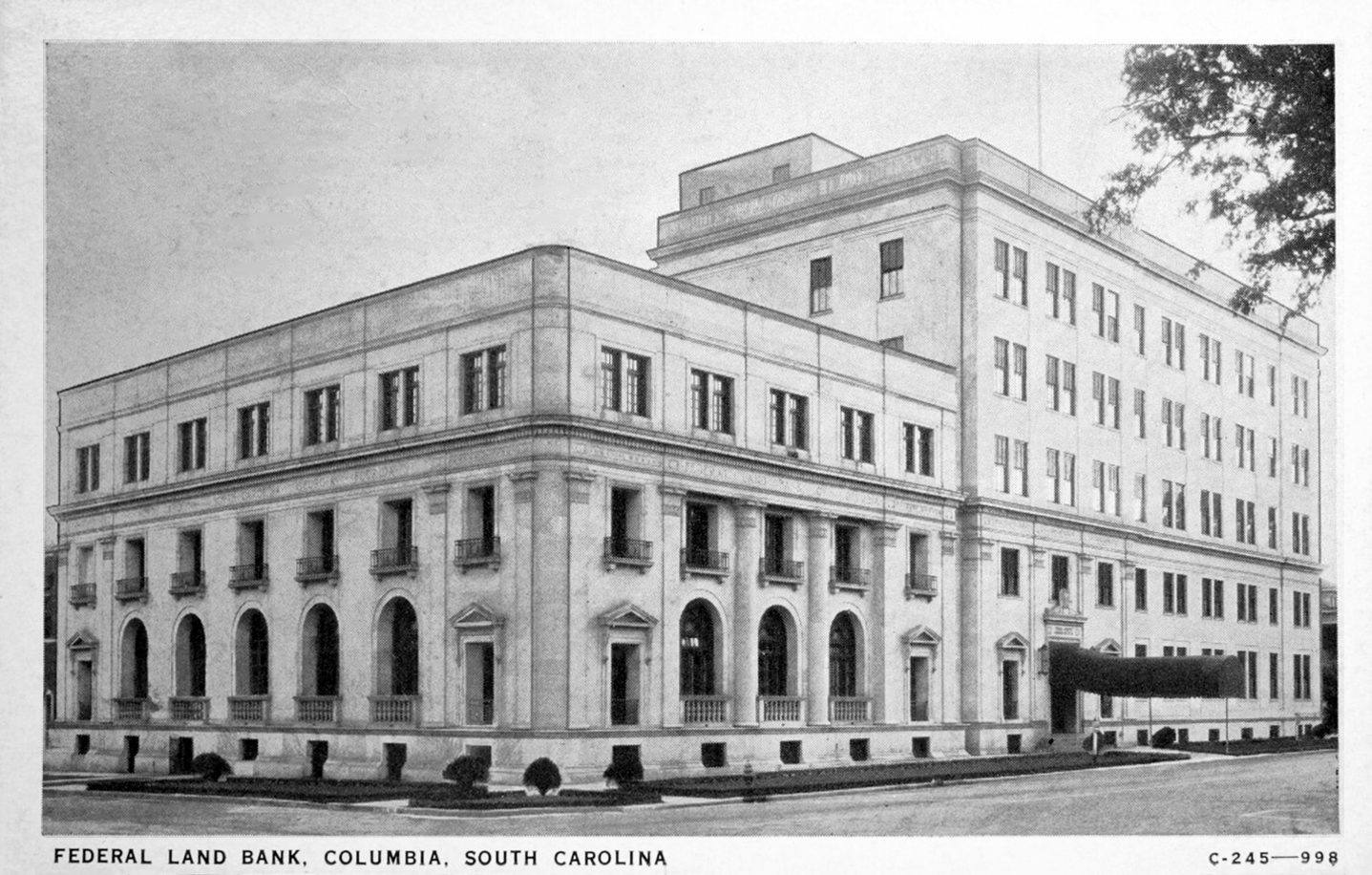
Federal Land Bank Building in the 1950s

The Federal Land Bank Building was listed on the National Register of Historic Places in 2015.

Construction began in 1923 and was completed in 1924. The building was added on to in 1935.
