= Columbia Electric Street Railway, Light & Power Substation =

- U.S. National Register of Historic Places
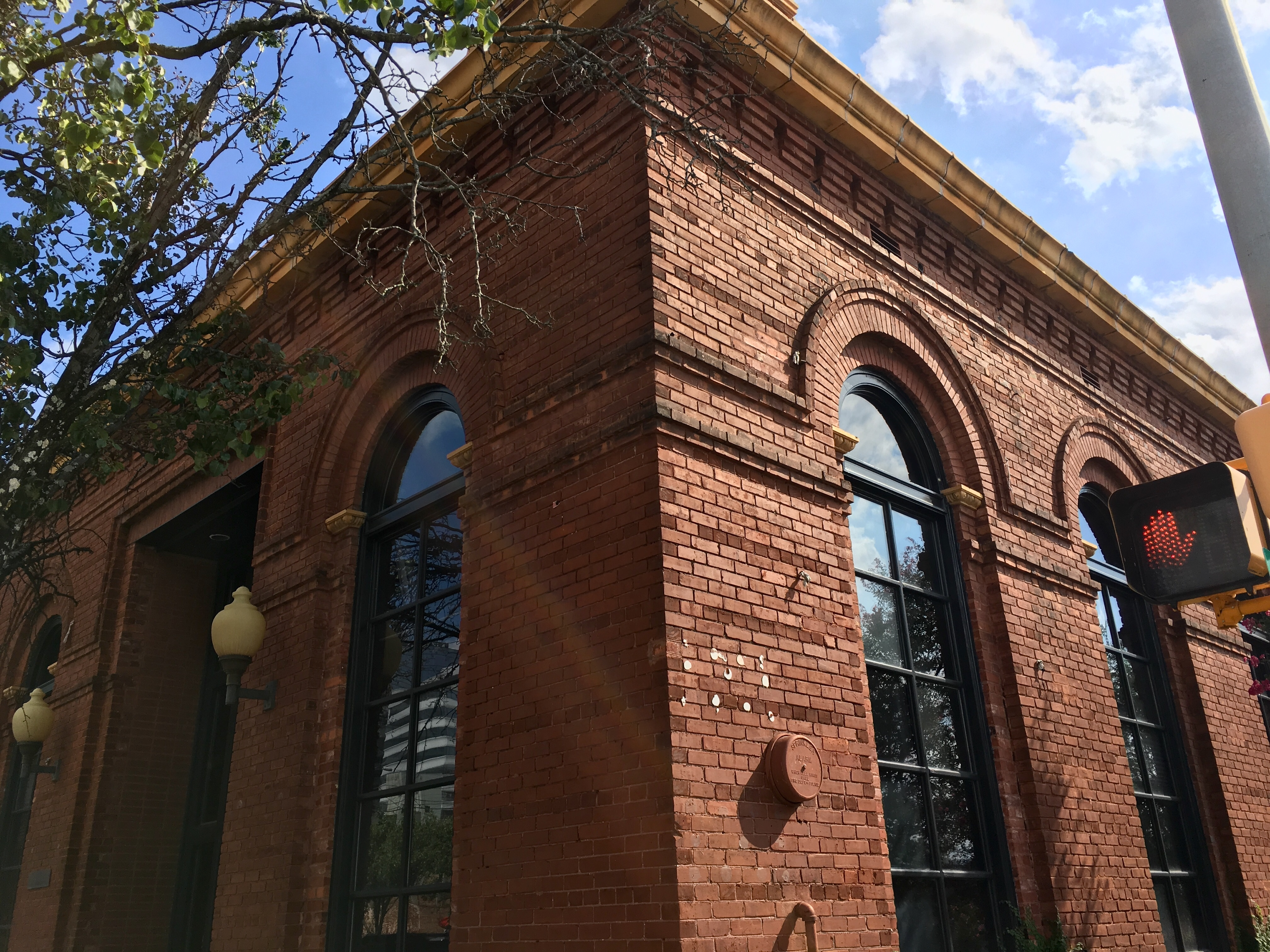

- Location within South Carolina Location within the United States
- Location: 1337 Assembly St. Columbia, South Carolina
- Coordinates: 34°00′09″N 81°02′10″W
- Area: Less than one acre
- Built: 1900
- Architectural style: Renaissance Revival
- NRHP reference No.: 10001220
- Added to NRHP: February 4, 2011

Columbia Electric Street Railway, Light & Power Substation is a historic power substation located in Columbia, South Carolina, US. It was built in 1900 with later additions and alterations, and is a two-story, Italian Renaissance Revival style red brick building. It features an arcade of rounded compound arches or archivolts. From 1900 until 1936, the building served as a power substation for the Columbia Electric Street Railway, Light & Power Company and its successors.

The Columbia Electric Street Railway, Light & Power Company Substation is architecturally significant for its distinctive Italian Renaissance Revival characteristics and historically significant for its direct association with Columbia's street railway or trolley system. The building was designed by W. B. Smith Whaley, an architect well known for his cotton mills throughout the American southeast. The substation, like many of Whaley's designs, is typically Italian Renaissance Revival in many of its defining features. The primary construction material is monochromatic red brick, laid in common or American bond pattern. The primary architectural element is the arcade of rounded compound arches or archivolts springing from broad piers. The massing is heavy, solid, and imposing. This weightiness is further emphasized by the flat roof and the recessed window and door openings. The substation was renovated in 1912 to meet the growing needs of the burgeoning trolley system - the electrical equipment was upgraded, three bays were added to the west end of the building, a second story was added within the volume of the building, the original office space was removed, and the tile floor was replaced with reinforced concrete throughout the building. A monitor roof was also installed (though removed at a later date), and the cornice on the west elevation was removed and reused on the extended north elevation. From its construction in 1900 until 1936, when the trolley system permanently discontinued service, the building served as a power substation (and briefly as the general offices) for the Columbia Electric Street Railway, Light & Power Company and its successors. The trolley system operated by this company and powered by the substation played an integral part in the creation, growth, and subsequent annexation of Columbia's suburbs during the early twentieth century. These developments are illustrative of the broad pattern of trolley-based public transportation and suburban expansion of many American cities in the late nineteenth and early twentieth centuries.

It was added to the National Register of Historic Places in 2011.
