= Canal Dime Savings Bank =

- U.S. National Register of Historic Places
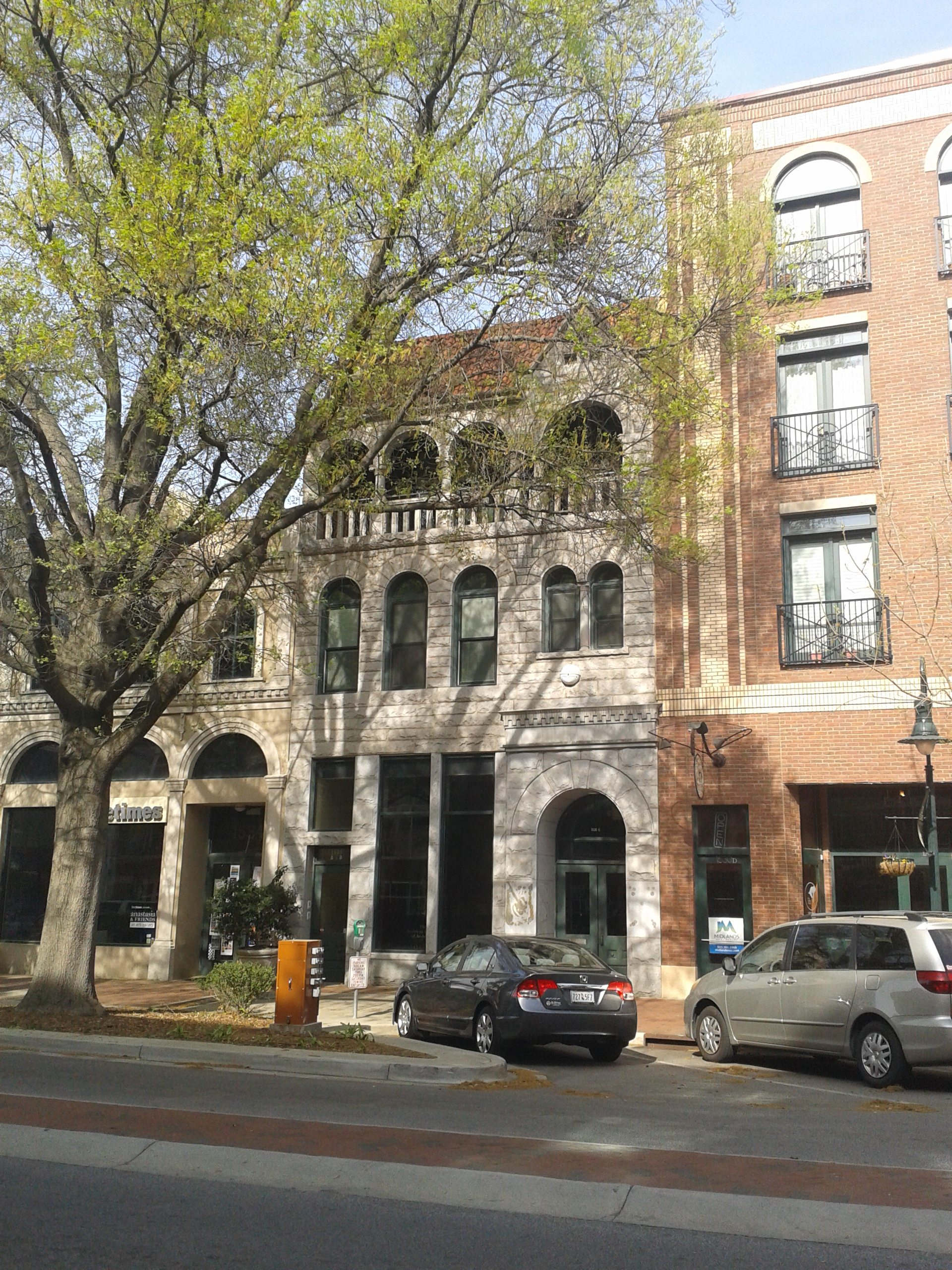
- Canal Dime Savings Bank in April, 2015

- Location within South Carolina Location within the United States
- Location: 1530 Main St., Columbia, South Carolina
- Coordinates: 34°0′20″N 81°2′8″W
- Area: 0.2 acres (0.081 ha)
- Built: 1892-1895
- Architect: Whaley, W.B. Smith, & Co.
- Architectural style: Romanesque
- MPS: Columbia MRA
- NRHP reference No.: 80004468
- Added to NRHP: November 25, 1980

Canal Dime Savings Bank, also known as Eckerd's Drug Store, is a historic bank building located at Columbia, South Carolina. It was built between 1892 and 1895, and is a three-story, Romanesque Revival style brick building with a granite façade and red barrel tile roof. The building was purchased by Eckerd's Drug Store in 1936.

It was added to the National Register of Historic Places in 1980.
