= Ensor-Keenan House =

Historic house in South Carolina, United States

- U.S. National Register of Historic Places
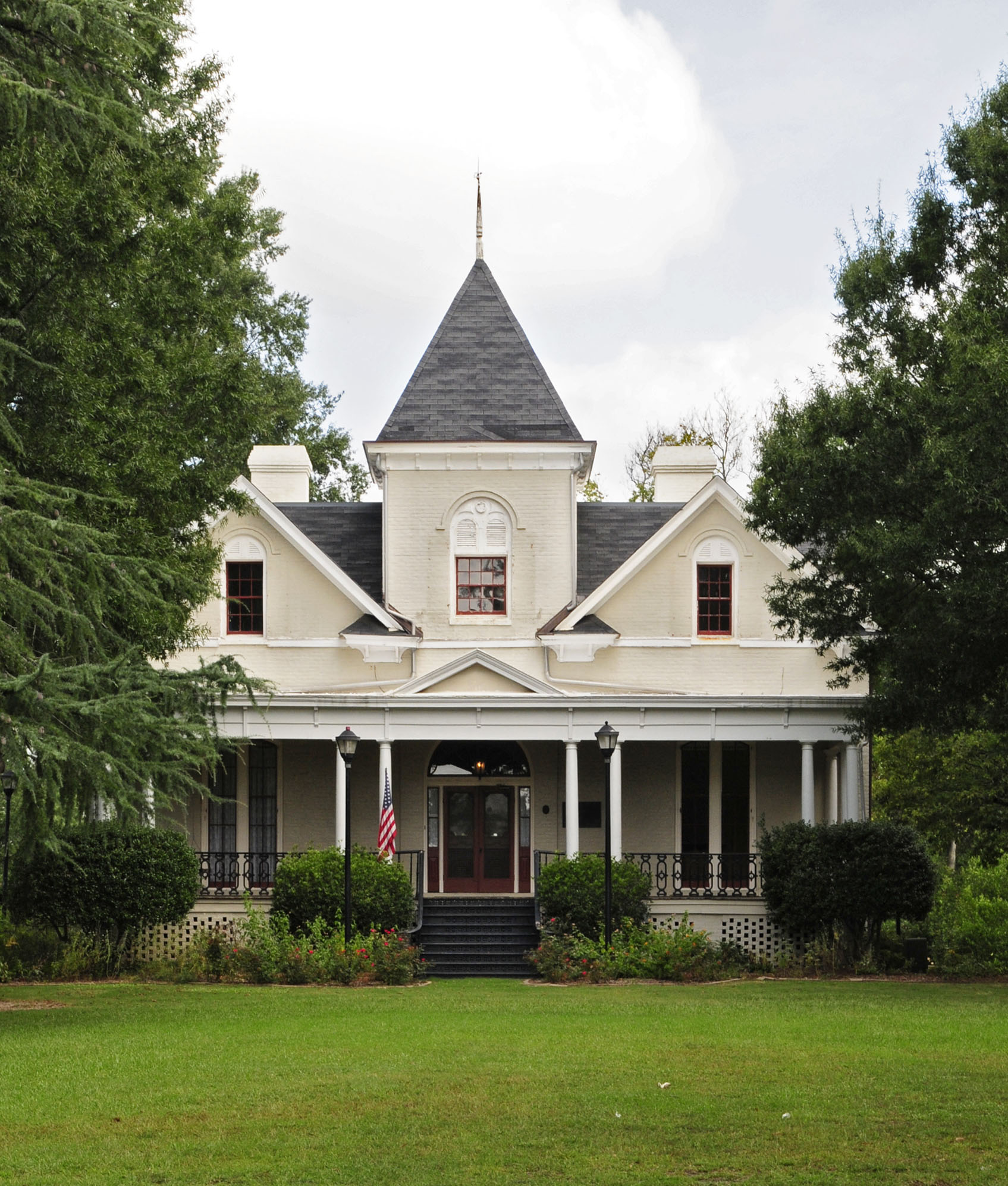
- Ensor-Keenan House, September 2012

- Location within South Carolina Location within the United States
- Location: 801 Wildwood Ave., Columbia, South Carolina
- Coordinates: 34°0′34″N 80°58′39″W
- Area: 11.2 acres (4.5 ha)
- Built: c. 1870
- Architectural style: Italianate
- MPS: Columbia MRA
- NRHP reference No.: 79003360
- Added to NRHP: March 2, 1979

Ensor-Keenan House is a historic home located at Columbia, South Carolina. It built about 1870, and is a 1 1/2-story, Italianate style frame dwelling. It features a central projecting pavilion with a steeply pitched hipped roof and full-width front porch. It was the home of Dr. Joshua Fulton Ensor, second medical superintendent of the State Asylum (South Carolina State Hospital).

It was added to the National Register of Historic Places in 1979.
