= World War Memorial Building =

- U.S. National Register of Historic Places
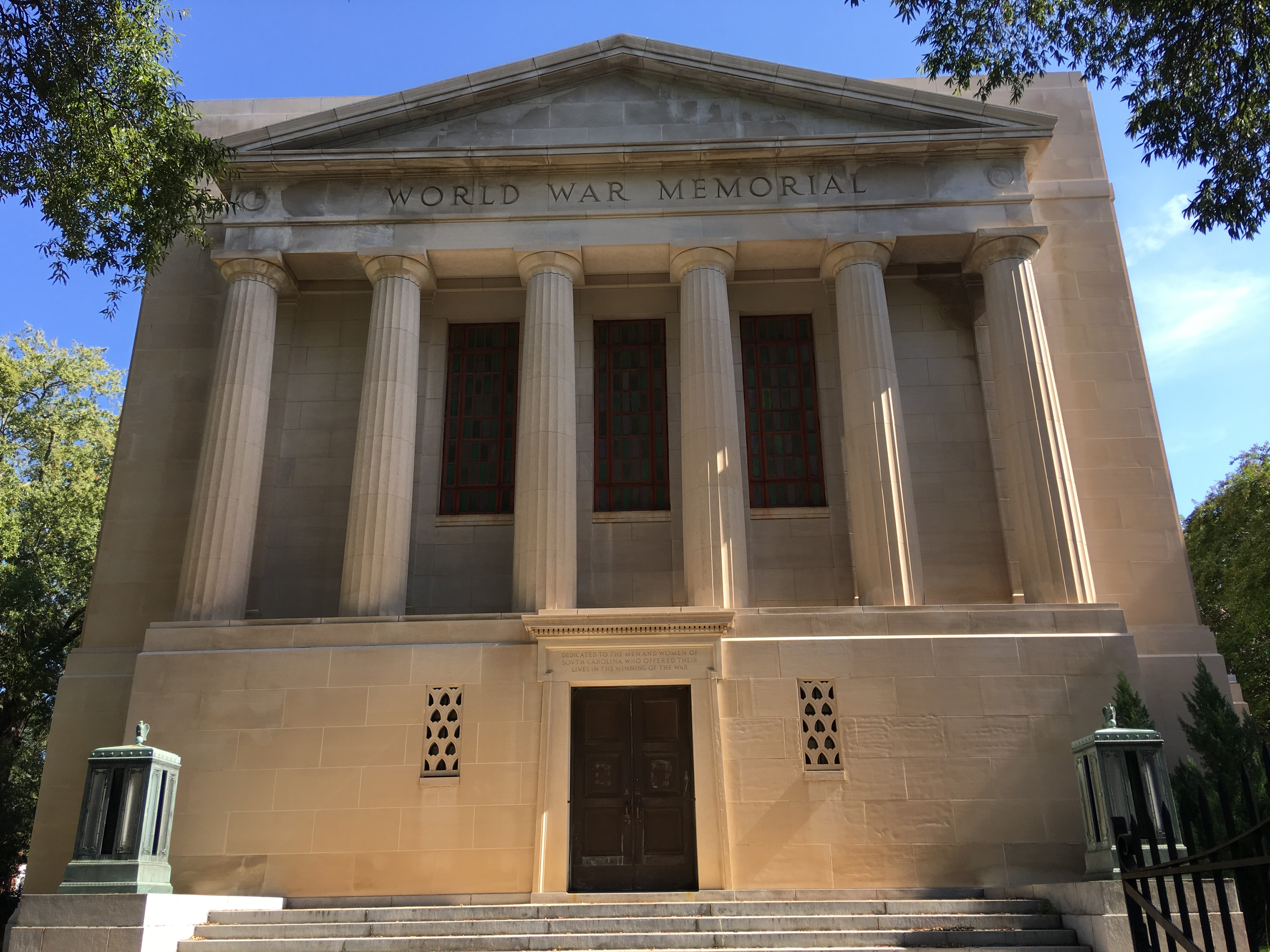

- Location within South Carolina Location within the United States
- Location: 920 Sumter St., Columbia, South Carolina
- Coordinates: 33°59′55″N 81°01′48″W
- Built: 1935
- Architect: Lafaye & Lafaye
- Architectural style: Classical Revival
- NRHP reference No.: 95000637
- Added to NRHP: May 26, 1995

World War Memorial Building is a building designed by Lafaye & Lafaye in Columbia, South Carolina, United States.

== History and design ==
The University of South Carolina Board of Trustees approved the building of a World War memorial in 1933. A design was brought forward the following year by Lafaye & Lafaye. J.J. McDevitt built the memorial in 1935. The cornerstone was laid by The American Legion's Wyndham Manning and contains a complete listing of all the South Carolina citizens involved in World War I. The memorial was dedicated on May 30, 1935.

The structure is modeled on a Roman or Greek temple. Construction is of granite and limestone. On the face of the entrance are six columns with three windows set between the central four columns. The building also features engravings over the entrance and on either side of the main doorway.

== Uses ==
Aside from being a monument to South Carolina's veterans, the building was also meant to function as office space. The Historical Commission became the first tenant, but outgrew the space, as the second floor was designated as a chapel and its office space housed the American Legion Auxiliary. The Historical Commission began seeking a new building in 1947. In 1960, the structure began housing the University of South Carolina's International Studies department. 1971 saw the South Carolina Confederate Relic Room and Museum take up residence in the building. The Confederate Relic Room was housed here for three decades. Today, the building houses University of South Carolina Publications

== Gallery ==
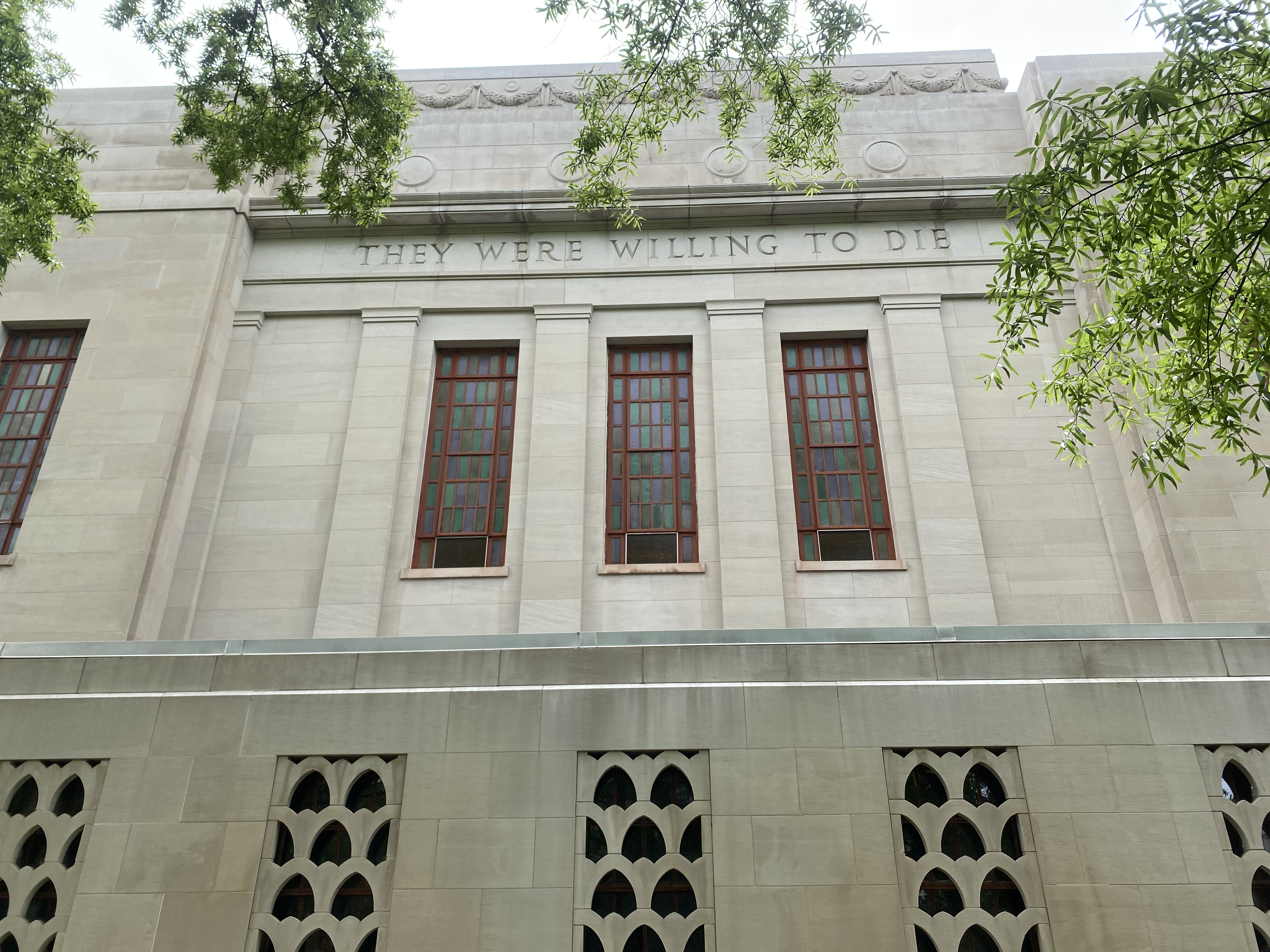
Pendleton Street Sidewall (north-facing)

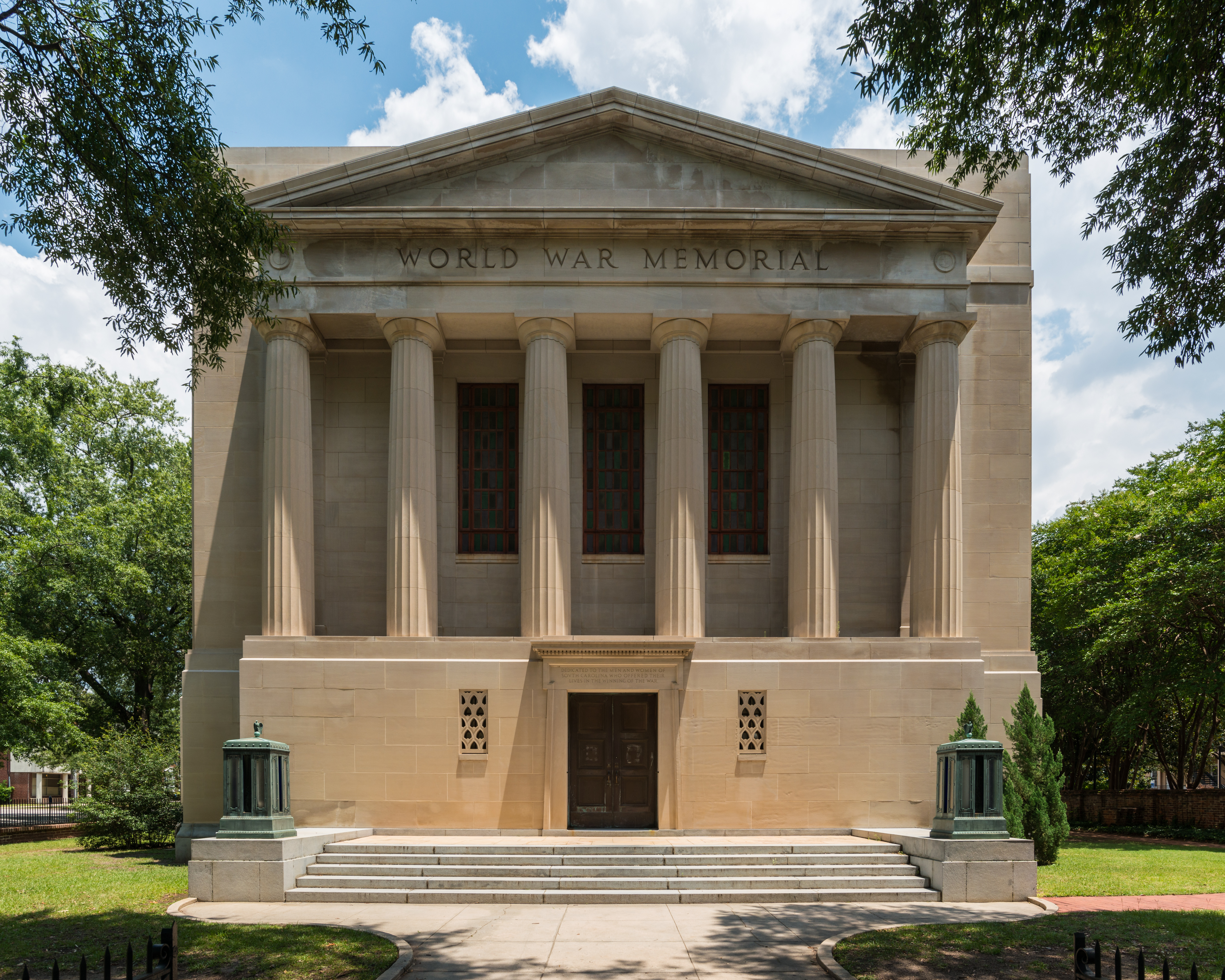
Entrance (west-facing)
