= Old Shandon Historic District =

Historic district in South Carolina, United States

- U.S. National Register of Historic Places
- U.S. Historic district
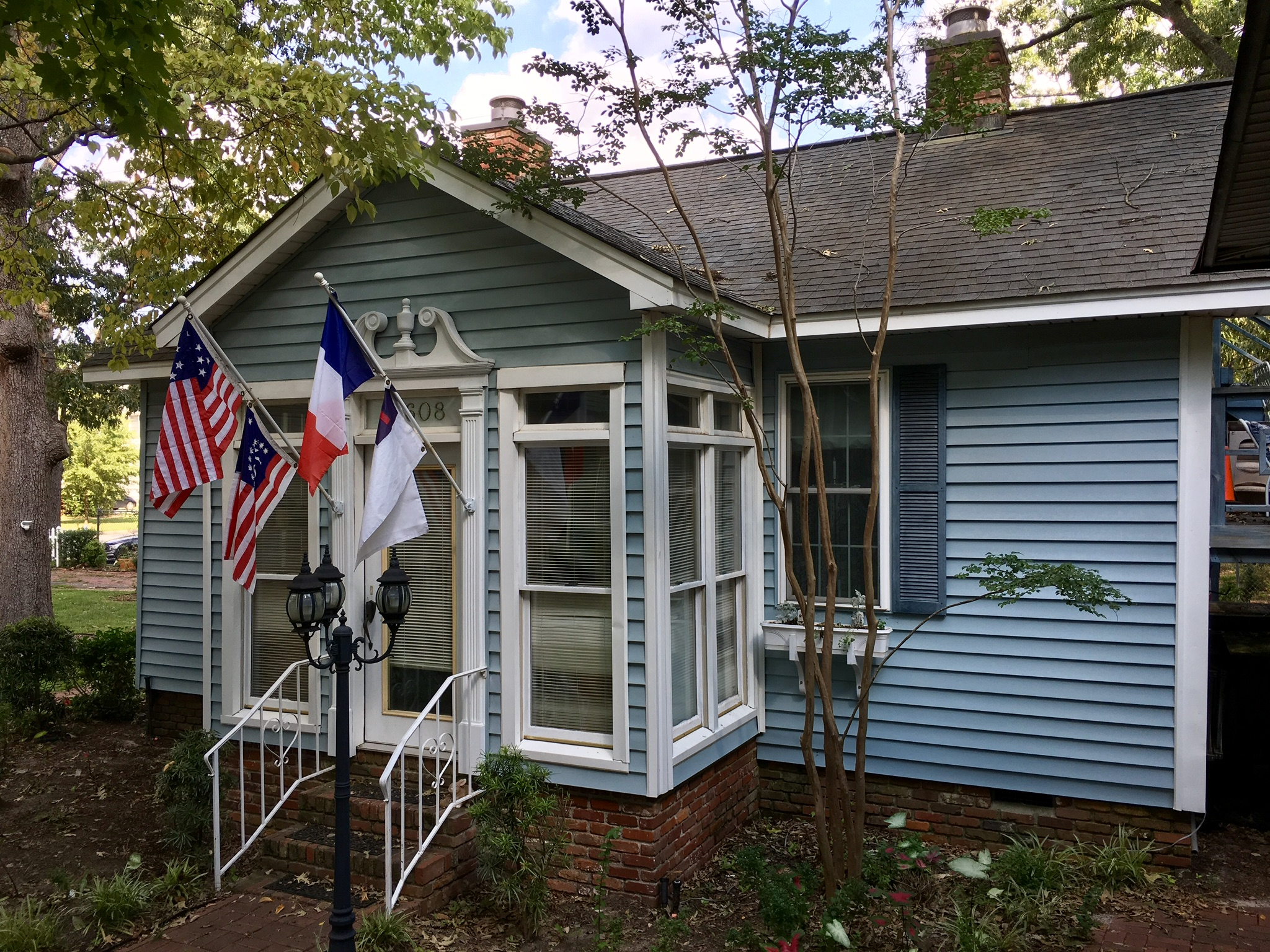
- French Consulate to the Confederacy

- Location within South Carolina Location within the United States
- Location: Roughly bounded by Cypress, Lee, Maple, Preston and Woodrow St., Columbia, South Carolina
- Coordinates: 34°00′04″N 81°00′15″W
- Area: 37 acres (15 ha)
- Architectural style: Late 19th And 20th Century Revivals
- NRHP reference No.: 03000887
- Added to NRHP: September 2, 2003

Old Shandon Historic District is a national historic district located at Columbia, South Carolina. The district encompasses 42 contributing buildings in a planned middle class residential development. They were built between the 1890s and 1950s, and the district includes examples of Queen Anne, Colonial Revival, Neoclassical Revival, and Craftsman/Bungalow style architecture. The district also includes the Shandon Baptist Church (Bethel A.M.E. Church) and Maple Street Southern Methodist Church.

It was added to the National Register of Historic Places in 2003.
