= Lever Building =

- U.S. National Register of Historic Places
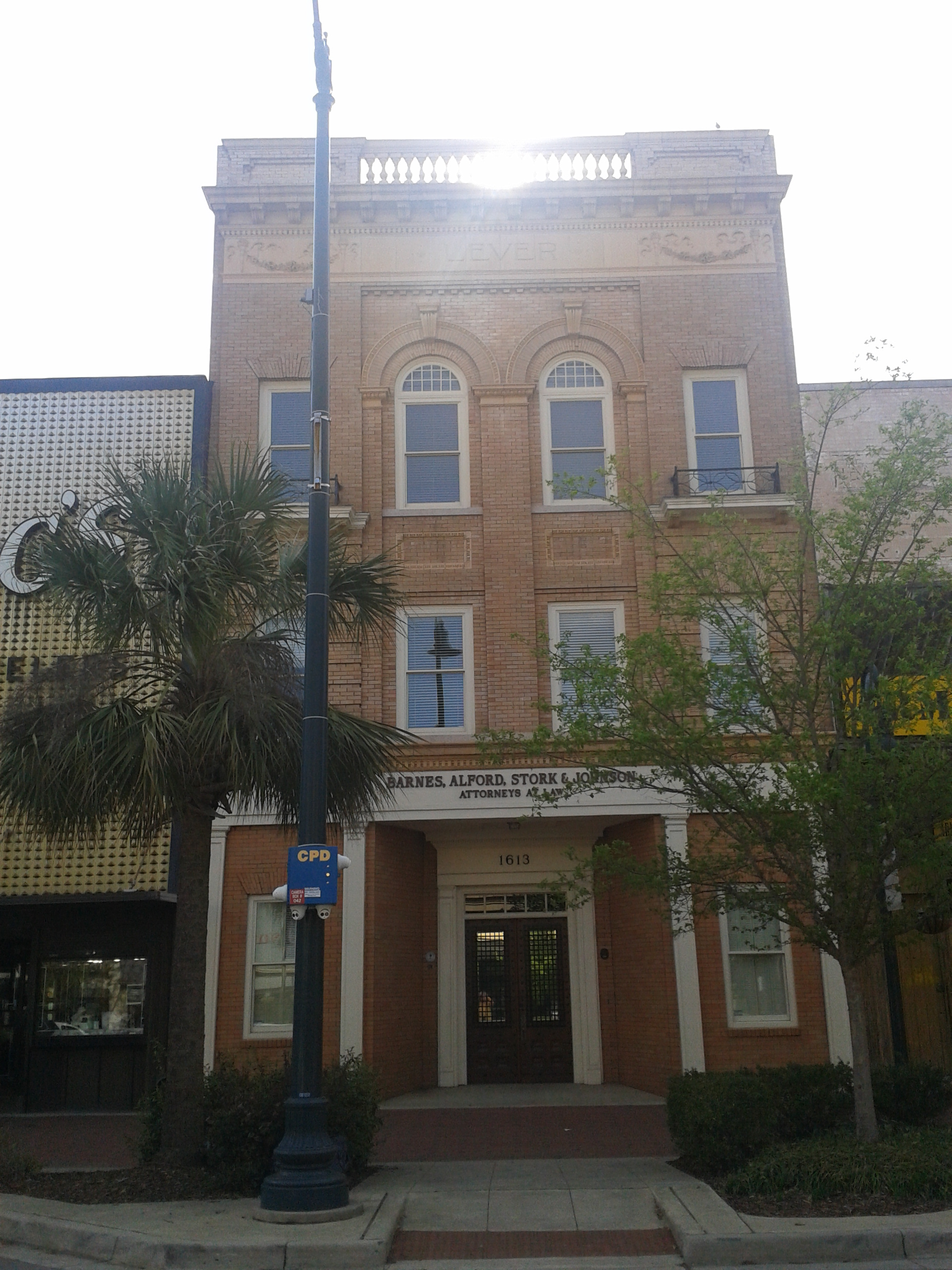
- The Lever Building in April, 2015

- Location within South Carolina Location within the United States
- Location: 1613 Main St., Columbia, South Carolina
- Coordinates: 34°0′24″N 81°2′12″W
- Area: 0.2 acres (0.081 ha)
- Built: 1903
- Built by: Lide, C.M., Jr.
- Architectural style: Early Commercial
- MPS: Columbia MRA
- NRHP reference No.: 79003372
- Added to NRHP: March 2, 1979

Lever Building is a historic commercial building located at Columbia, South Carolina. It was built in 1903, and is a three-story building faced with brown brick and terra cotta.

It was added to the National Register of Historic Places in 1979.
