= Confederate Printing Plant =

- U.S. National Register of Historic Places
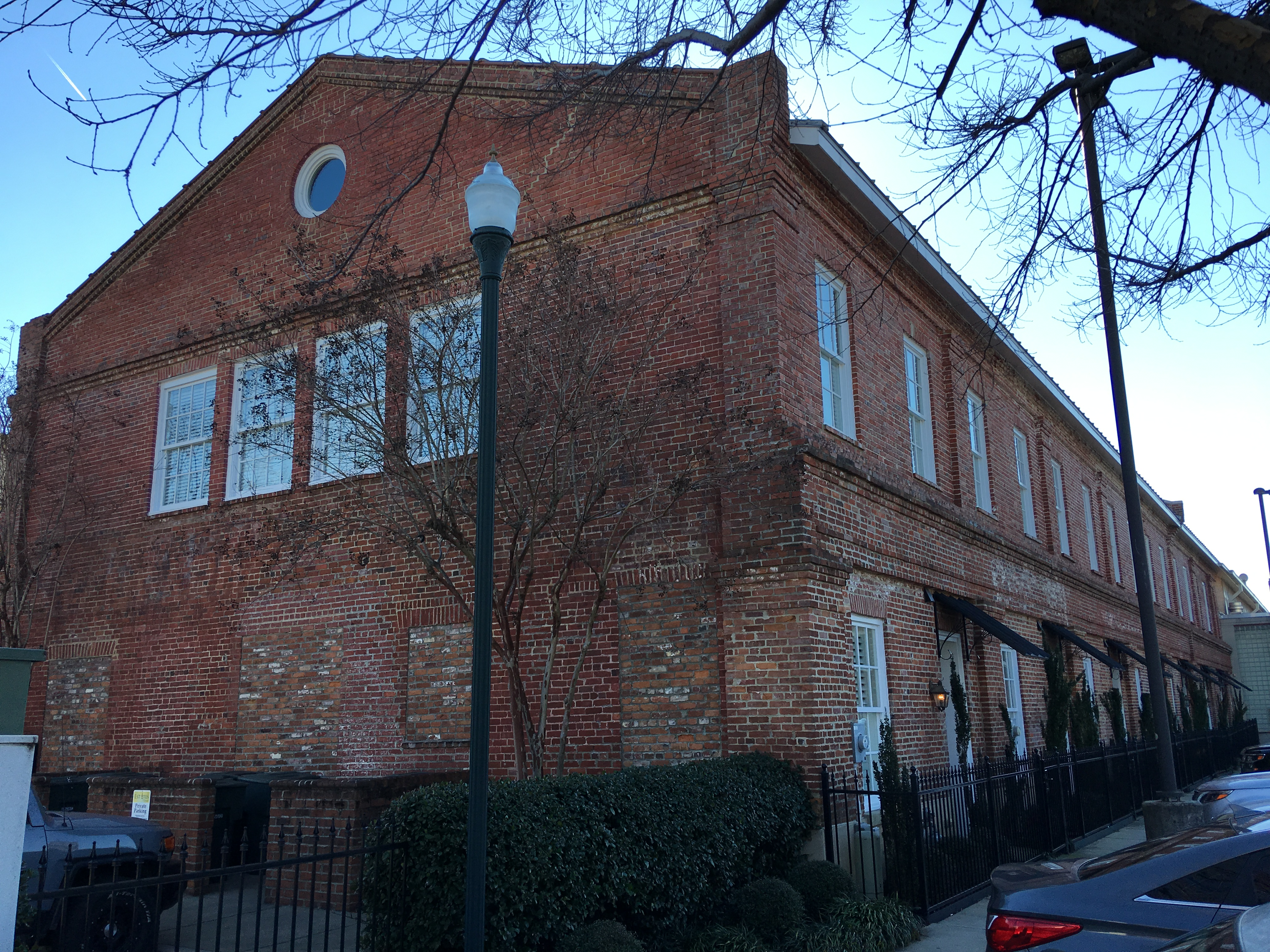

- Location within South Carolina Location within the United States
- Location: 501 Gervais St., Columbia, South Carolina
- Coordinates: 33°59′53″N 81°2′41″W
- Area: 1 acre (0.40 ha)
- Built: 1864-1865
- Architectural style: Greek Revival
- NRHP reference No.: 79002393
- Added to NRHP: March 28, 1979

Confederate Printing Plant is a historic industrial building located at Columbia, South Carolina. It was built in 1864, and is a large two-story, Greek Revival style brick structure. Originally it was a one-story structure, but enlarged to two-stories after the building was burned in February 1865 by General William Tecumseh Sherman’s army. It was built by the Evans and Cogswell Company for the manufacture of Confederate bonds and other printing purposes. During the 20th century, it was used as a liquor warehouse by the South Carolina Dispensary and is presently used as a Publix grocery store and residential condominiums.

It was added to the National Register of Historic Places in 1979.
