= Consolidated Building (Columbia, South Carolina) =

- U.S. National Register of Historic Places
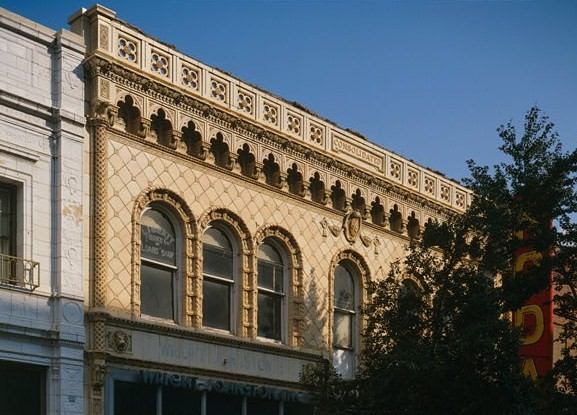
- Consolidated Building, HABS Photo, November 1986

- Location within South Carolina Location within the United States
- Location: 1326-1330 Main St., Columbia, South Carolina
- Coordinates: 34°0′12″N 81°2′4″W
- Area: 0.3 acres (0.12 ha)
- Built: 1912
- Architect: Johnson, J. Carroll
- MPS: Columbia MRA
- NRHP reference No.: 79003373
- Added to NRHP: March 2, 1979

Consolidated Building is a historic commercial building located at Columbia, South Carolina. It was built in 1912, and is a two-story building faced with elaborate colored and glazed terra cotta. The second floor features a central tripartite round-headed window.

It was added to the National Register of Historic Places in 1979.
