= Building at 1210–1214 Main Street =

- U.S. National Register of Historic Places
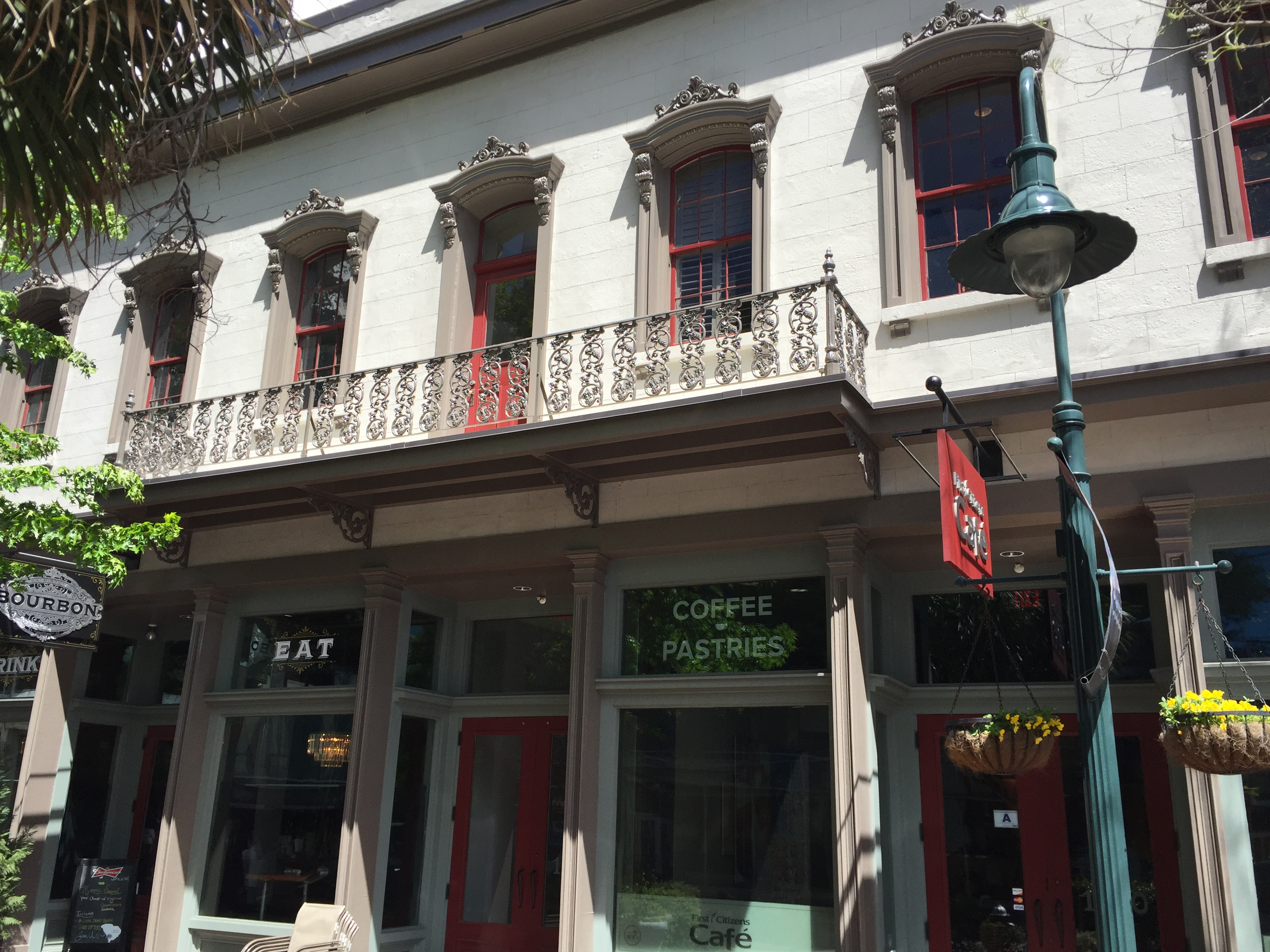

- Location within South Carolina Location within the United States
- Location: 1210–1214 Main St., Columbia, South Carolina
- Coordinates: 34.0019°N 81.0335°W
- Area: 0.2 acres (0.081 ha)
- Built: c. 1871
- Architectural style: Early Commercial
- MPS: Columbia MRA
- NRHP reference No.: 79003361
- Added to NRHP: March 2, 1979

Building at 1210–1214 Main Street, also known as Capitol Café, is a historic commercial building located at Columbia, South Carolina. It was built by 1871, and is a two-story, seven-bay, stuccoed brick building. A cast-iron railing extends across central three bays of the second floor. The Capitol Café was previously located in the building since 1913.

It was added to the National Register of Historic Places in 1979.
