= Building at 1644 Main Street =

- U.S. National Register of Historic Places
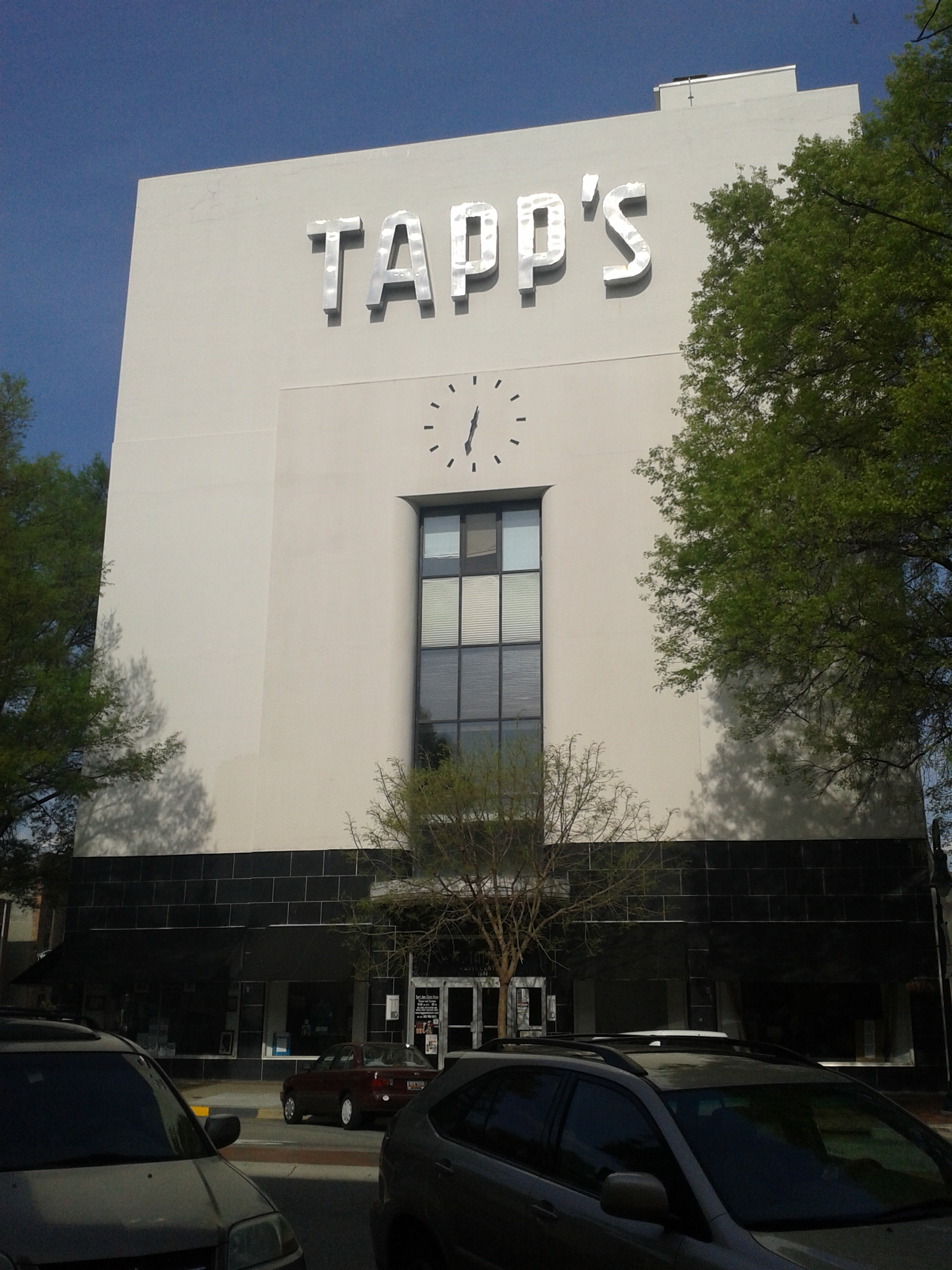
- Building at 1644 Main Street in April, 2015

- Location within South Carolina Location within the United States
- Location: 1644 Main St., Columbia, South Carolina
- Coordinates: 34°0′27″N 81°2′11″W
- Area: 0.3 acres (0.12 ha)
- Built: 1940, 1950
- Architect: Behles, F. Paul
- Architectural style: Depression Modern
- MPS: Columbia MRA
- NRHP reference No.: 79003377
- Added to NRHP: March 2, 1979

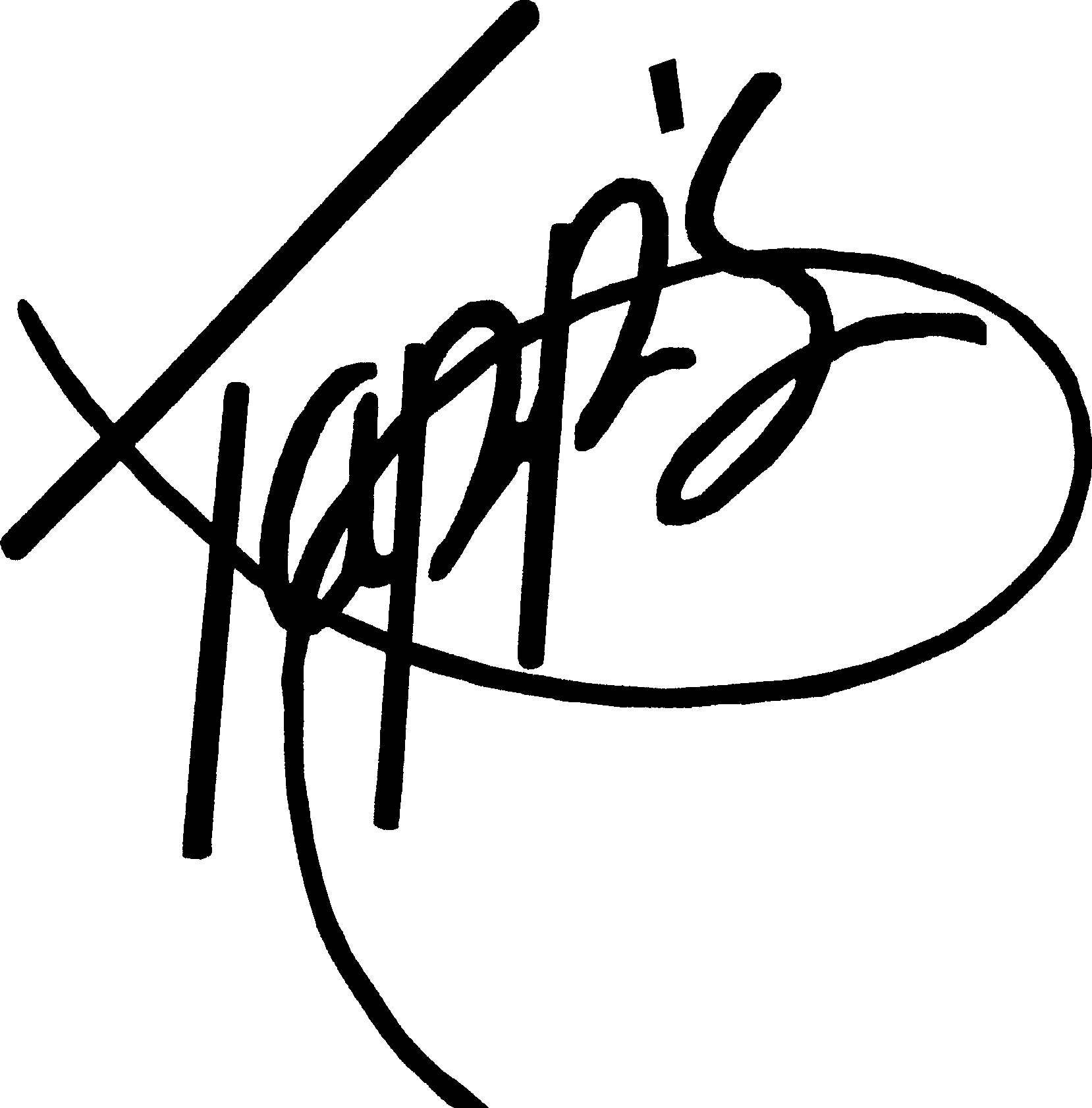
Tapp's department store final logo

The Building at 1644 Main Street, also known as Tapp's Department Store, is a historic commercial building located at Columbia, South Carolina. It was built in 1940, and enlarged in 1950. It is a five- to seven-story, Depression Modern building faced in stucco and dark tremolite stone. Above the main entrance is a distinctive clock face and a sign with large freestanding letters. Tapp's Department Store closed in 1995.

It was added to the National Register of Historic Places in 1979.
