= Building at 303 Saluda Avenue =

- U.S. National Register of Historic Places
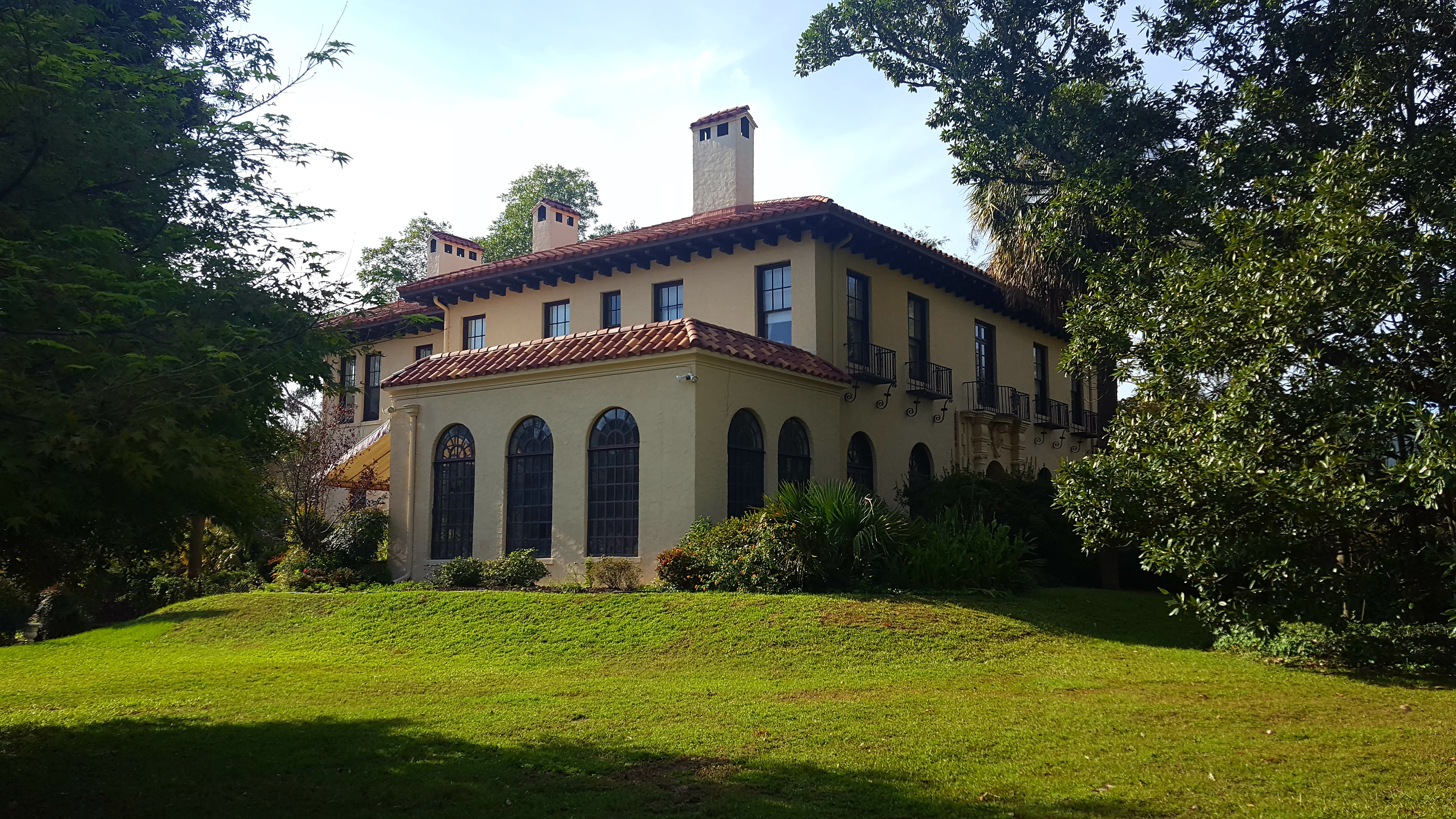

- Location within South Carolina Location within the United States
- Location: 303 Saluda Ave. Columbia, South Carolina
- Coordinates: 33°59′34″N 81°1′2″W
- Area: 0.7 acres (0.28 ha)
- Built: 1917, 1927-1928
- Architect: Heslep, John C.; Marquardt, George
- Architectural style: Mission/Spanish Revival
- MPS: Columbia MRA
- NRHP reference No.: 82003900
- Added to NRHP: May 24, 1982

Building at 303 Saluda Avenue, also known as John C. Heslep House, is a historic home located at Columbia, South Carolina. It was built about 1917 as a two-story brick residence, then remodeled and rebuilt in the Spanish Colonial Revival style in 1927–1928. It features a low-pitched tile roof, coarse stucco walls, and cast iron balconies. Also on the property is a contributing guest house.

It was added to the National Register of Historic Places in 1982.
