= J. Davis Powell House =

Historic house in South Carolina, United States

- U.S. National Register of Historic Places
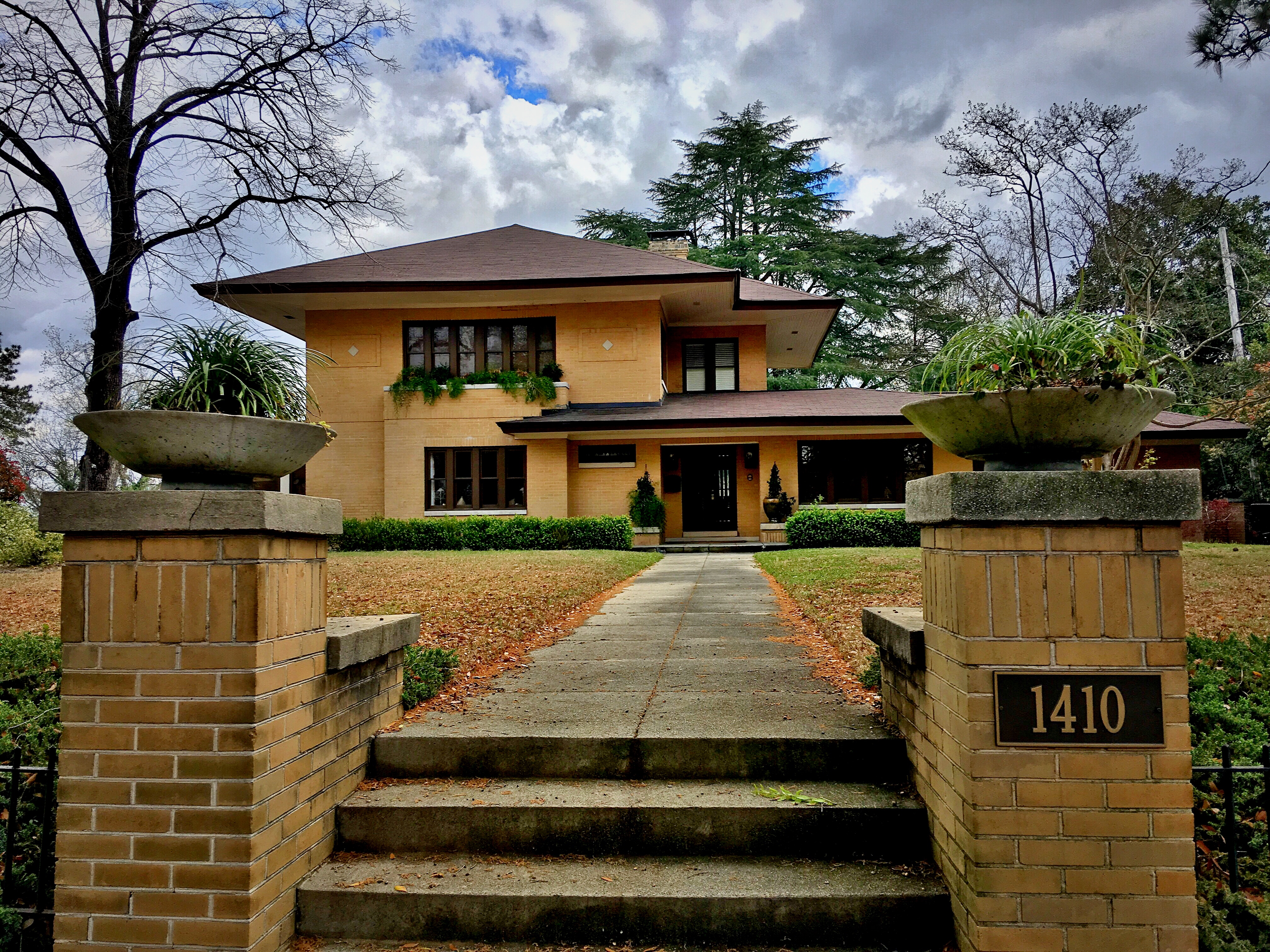

- Location within South Carolina Location within the United States
- Location: 1410 Shirley St. Columbia, South Carolina
- Coordinates: 34°00′26″N 80°59′53″W
- Area: 1.051 acres (0.425 ha)
- Built: 1919-1920
- Architect: Dernier, Floyd A.
- Architectural style: Prairie Style
- NRHP reference No.: 12000823
- Added to NRHP: September 25, 2012

J. Davis Powell House is a historic home located at Columbia, South Carolina. It was built in 1919–1920, and is a two-story, irregular plan, yellow brick, Prairie Style dwelling believed to be designed by Floyd A. Dernier (1879-1934). It has a broad, low-pitched, hipped roof and sets of elongated, repeated windows on both floors. Also on the property are the contributing garage (c. 1920) with a second story addition (c. 1940); a pool house (c. 1920) and pool (c. 1935); four cast stone classical columns (c. 1920); a goldfish pond or pool (c. 1920); and an outdoor fireplace (c. 1922).

It was added to the National Register of Historic Places in 2012.
