= George R. Price House =

Historic house in South Carolina, United States

- U.S. National Register of Historic Places
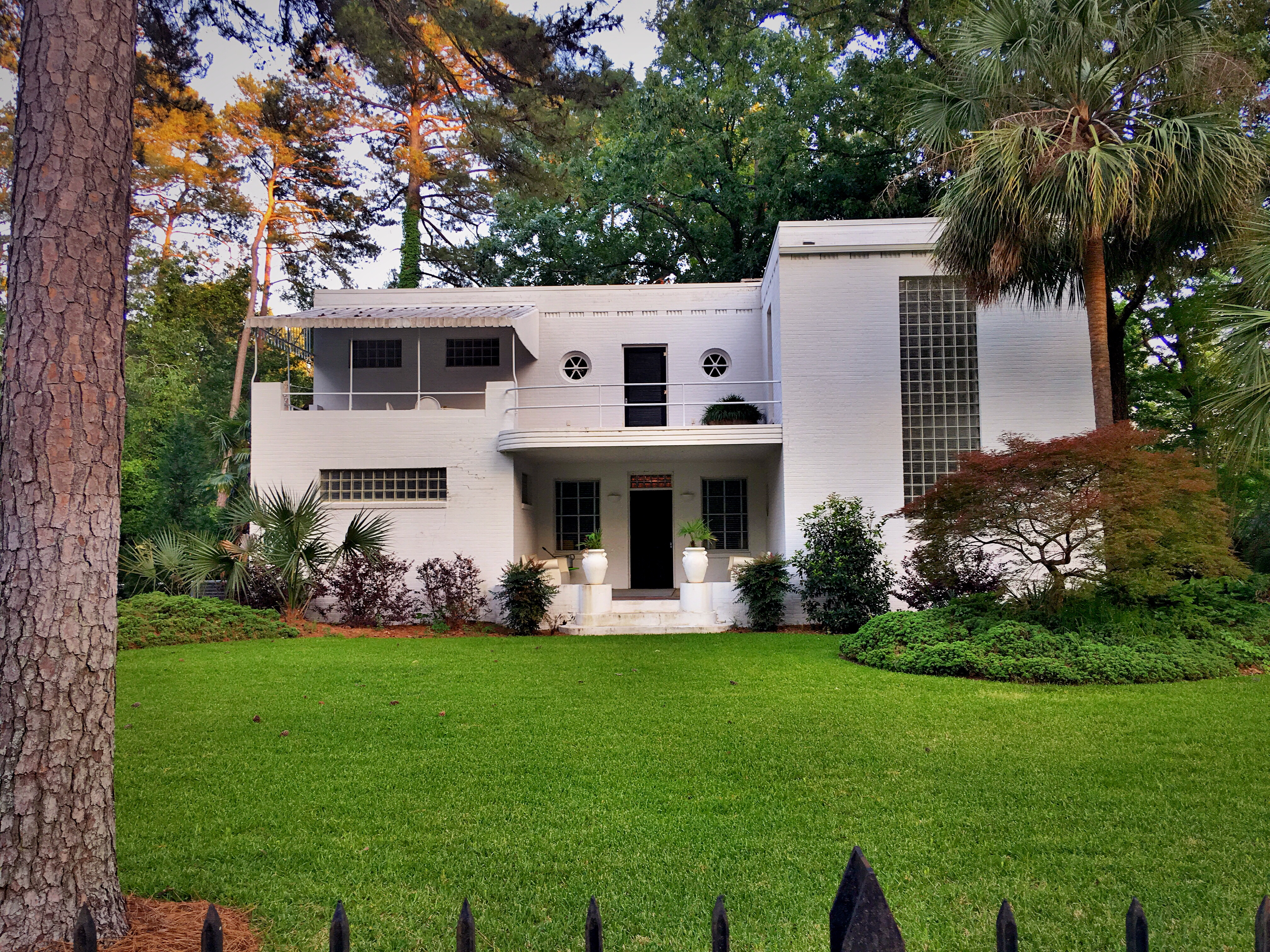

- Location within South Carolina Location within the United States
- Location: 3000 Forest Dr. Columbia, South Carolina
- Coordinates: 34°0′54″N 80°59′54″W
- Area: less than one acre
- Built: 1939
- Built by: Price, George R.
- Architectural style: Moderne
- NRHP reference No.: 98000417
- Added to NRHP: April 30, 1998

George R. Price House is a historic home located at Columbia, South Carolina. It was built in 1939, and is a two-story, L-shaped, steel-framed, masonry dwelling in the Streamline Moderne style. It has a flat roof, glass block windows, multiple porches, and a three-car garage.

It was added to the National Register of Historic Places in 1998 by Elaine Gillespie, the owner at the time. She also started a tradition about that same time that has remained in place through several owners. She began placing two decorative robots on the upstairs front porch for holidays. She named them Freddie and Tobar and the community loved them so much the house became known at “The Robot House.”
