= Heslep House =

Historic house in South Carolina, United States

- U.S. National Register of Historic Places
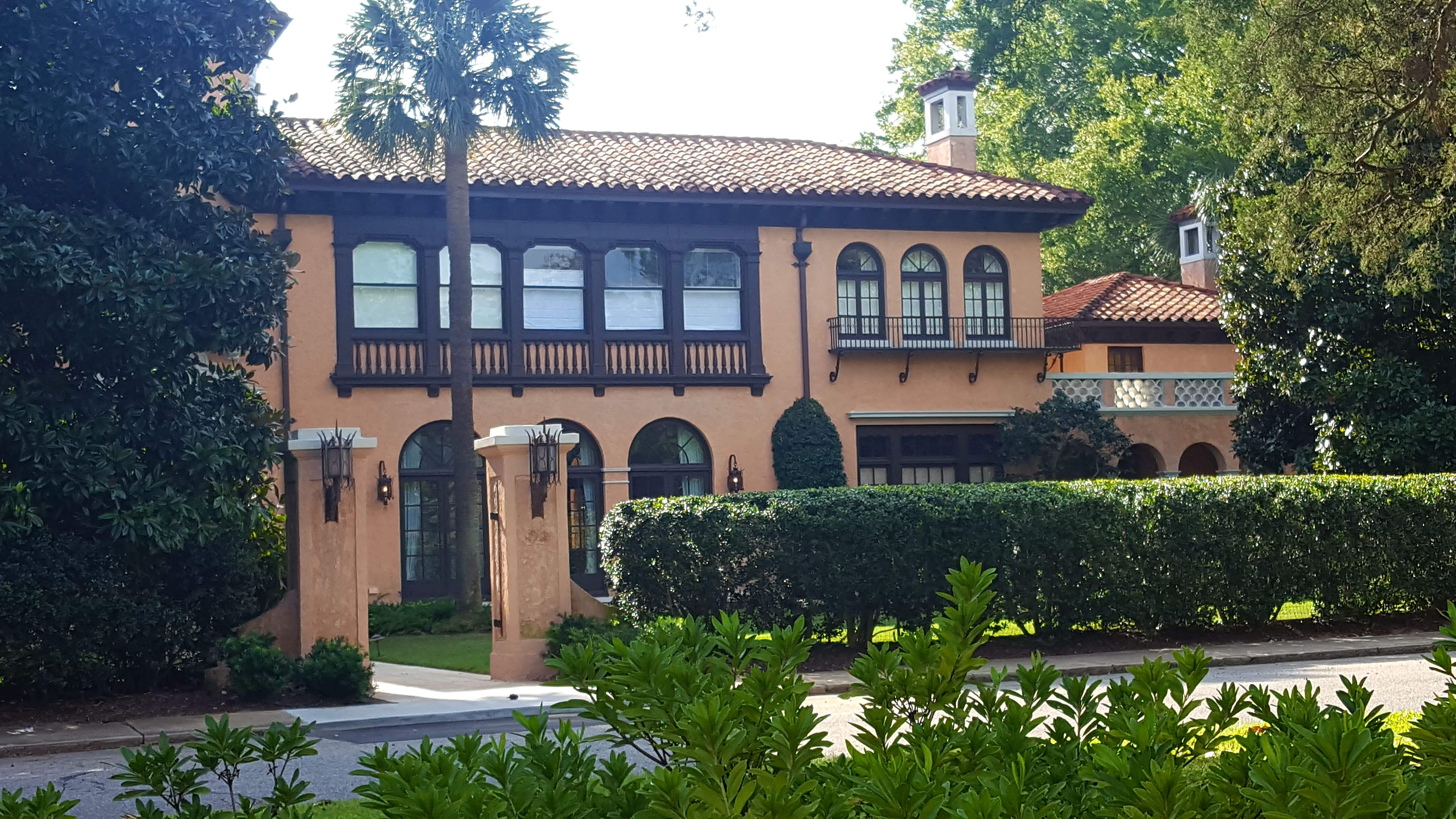

- Location within South Carolina Location within the United States
- Location: 203 Saluda Ave. Columbia, South Carolina
- Coordinates: 33°59′31″N 81°1′0″W
- Area: less than one acre
- Built: 1927
- Built by: Heslep, J.C.
- Architectural style: Mission/Spanish Revival
- MPS: Columbia MRA
- NRHP reference No.: 79003378
- Added to NRHP: March 2, 1979

Heslep House is a historic home located at Columbia, South Carolina. It built about 1927, and is a two-story Spanish Mission Revival style stuccoed house. It features round-headed windows, arches, balconies, sun decks, a square tower, sculptural portal and barrel tile roof.

It was added to the National Register of Historic Places in 1979.
