= A. Fletcher Spigner House =

Historic house in South Carolina, United States

- U.S. National Register of Historic Places
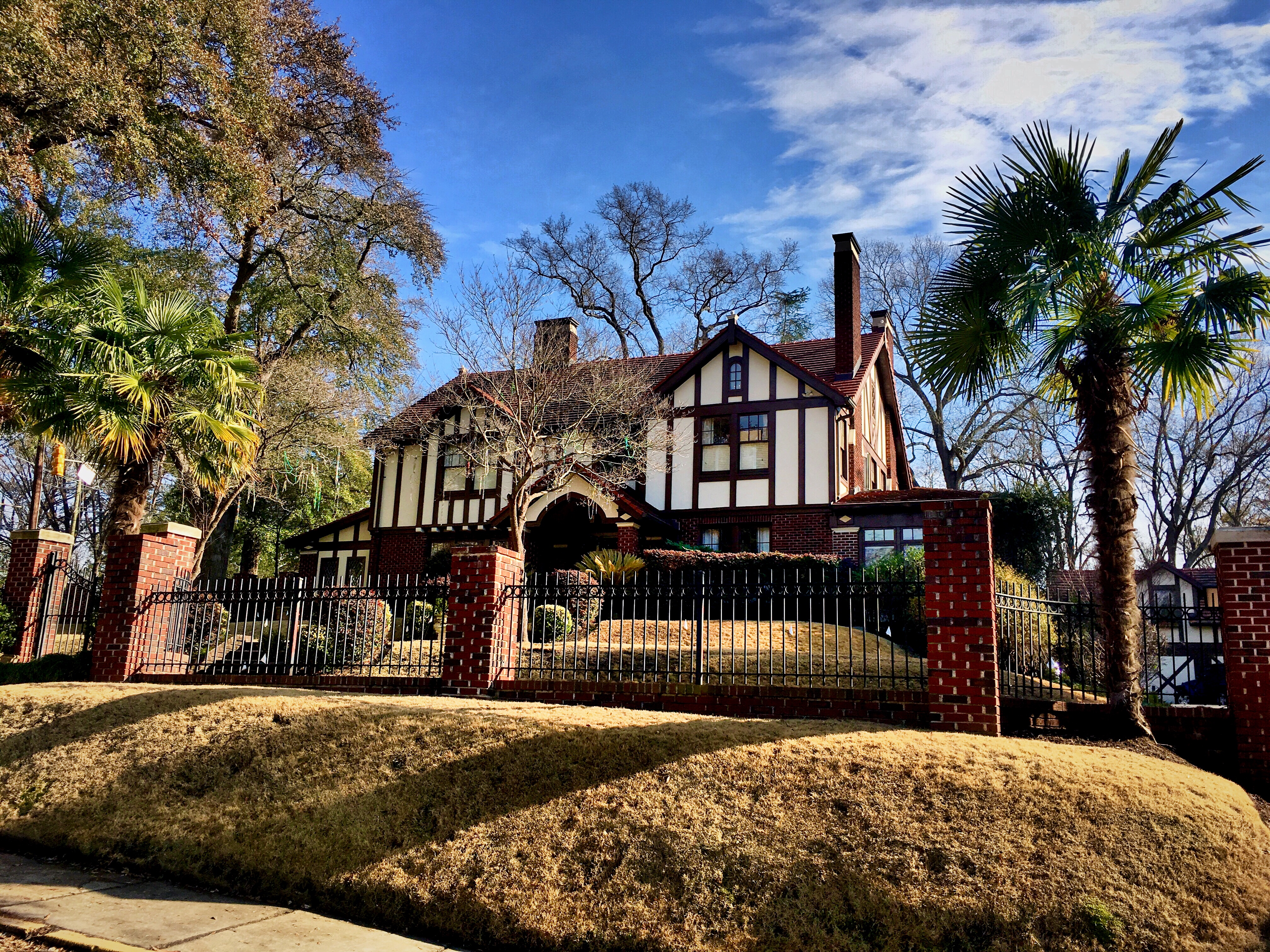

- Location within South Carolina Location within the United States
- Location: 2028 Wheat St. Columbia, South Carolina
- Coordinates: 33°59′45″N 81°0′55″W
- Area: less than one acre
- Built: 1920
- Architect: Lafaye & Lafaye
- Architectural style: Tudor Revival
- NRHP reference No.: 09001107
- Added to NRHP: December 11, 2009

A. Fletcher Spigner House, also known as the Spigner-Wilson-Seibels House and Hanner House, is a historic home located at Columbia, South Carolina. It was built in 1920, and is a 2 1/2-story double-pile, rectangular frame residence in the Tudor Revival style. It has a one-story, central front portico, a red terra cotta tile roof, and faux half-timbering with a finish of stucco on the second floor. Also on the property is a 1 1/2-story garage. It was built for A. Fletcher Spigner, a prominent Columbia attorney, State Senator, and South Carolina's Fifth Circuit Solicitor.

It was added to the National Register of Historic Places in 2009.
