= Corrine Jones Playground =

Playground in Charleston, South Carolina, US

Coordinates: 32.807920°N 79.959183°W

- Interactive map of Corrine Jones Playground
- Location: 36 Marlow St., Charleston, South Carolina
- Area: 3.4 acres (1.4 ha)
- Created: 1954
- Operator: City of Charleston

Corrine Jones Playground was formerly known as Hester Park because of its location along Hester Street in Charleston, South Carolina. The playground is located on a portion of the larger Buist Tract that had been used during World War II as housing for the influx of wartime workers.

== Ashley Homes ==
In 1933, Charleston was an early proponent of using federal funds for housing and began making plans for a development at the west end of Grove St. in Wagener Terrace and another one at the West Point Rice Mill. Those projects were tabled because of the opposition of real estate professionals and residents, and instead in 1934, the focus became a housing project on Meeting St. that would become Meeting Street Manor. That first project was completed in 1937 after delays. After the Robert Mills Manor, Ansonborough Homes, and Gadsden Green Homes were completed, the need for housing seemed met until servicemen began arriving in mass numbers during World War II. The Tom McMillan Homes and Ben Legare Homes were quickly begun in North Charleston. Liberty Homes in North Charleston, the Daniel Jenkins Homes north of Charleston, and Kiawah Homes followed. The Ashley Homes and St. Andrew's Homes came next. Ashley Homes was the name of the housing development built on the Buist Tract.

The land for the projects had been acquired by condemnation and included Liberty Homes Extension, Daniel Jenkins Homes, Ashley Homes, and the Boulevard Dormitories. The development was designed by Douglas Ellington. Other projects part of the same push were the Victory Court (at Grove and King Sts.) and Boulevard Dormitories (King St. extension). The development was designed as temporary housing meant to be removed from the leased Buist Tract which would be returned to its original condition after the war. The buildings were built of cream-colored, hollow tile and included an administrative building and repair shop. Skinner and Ruddick was the low bidder for the Ashley Homes development and several others in 1942. The development was to have 96 three-room units, 30 four-room units, and 20 five-room units. Each of the war housing projects had the same rules for admission: The qualifying residents had to (1) be the head of a family which needed to live with the head of the household; (2) be civilians and not service members; (3) be employed by one of a list of local employers; (4) come from somewhere beyond a reasonable commute; (5) have arrived in the area after July 1, 1941; and (6) be living in makeshift conditions. The original plan had been that the housing would be demolished when the war ended and demand abated, but the drop in demand did not occur.

Occupation of the development started on May 20, 1943. Opened in May 1943, the Ashley Homes company provided ninety-six three-room apartments that rented for $31.25, thirty four-room apartments for $36.25, and twenty-four five-room apartments at $41.25. Workers at the Navy Base preferred government housing in North Charleston to be nearer the base, but all of the war housing was full in June 1943.

The Charleston Housing Authority decided not to extend its deal with the federal government to manage the war housing in 1947. After September 30, 1947, the management would be taken over by the Federal Public Housing Authority. The Charleston Housing Authority had overseen the construction and operation of all the housing. The complexes were the George Legare Homes, John C. Calhoun Homes, (3) Liberty Homes with its extensions, (4) St. Andrew's Homes, (5) Kiawah Homes, (6) Victory Court apartments, (7) Ashley Homes, (8) Read Hill Homes, and (9) Daniel Jenkins Homes. The Charleston Housing Authority decided to part ways with the federal government following a disagreement about a rise in the rents and the slowness of the disposition of the housing; the authority explained that it could not afford to maintain vacant housing which had been inferior by design. The Victory Court and 400 of the units at Liberty Homes were demolished by September 1947 with the salvaged materials sent to Clemson University for use there.

Five projects (St. Andrews Homes, Ashley Homes, Victory Court, John C. Calhoun Homes, and Liberty Homes) were used for veterans after the war.

When the Korean War arrived, the federal government placed a freeze on the transfer of the World War II housing which had been planned to be sold off. The stay included Liberty Homes (285 units), Calhoun Homes (350 units), Ashley Homes (150 units), Victory Court (64 units), St. Andrew's Homes (410 units), Daniel Jenkins Homes (420 units), and Kiawah Homes (60 units).

In 1955, the freeze was lifted and plans were made to demolish some of the housing. The local school district wanted to acquire some of the land used for the Ashley Homes to erect a badly needed school for the northwest section of the city. Residents of Victory Court and Ashley Homes were given until February 28, 1955 to vacate.

On February 27, 1955, Ashley Homes was sold to salvage company from Milledgeville, Georgia and dismantled. Demolition happened in April 1955. By June 1955, all but two of the buildings (which were retained only for storage) were dismantled with the materials sold locally; surplus materials would be shipped elsewhere. Locals were offered their pick of unsold salvage materials before the remainder was shipped off.

== School site ==
The local school board voted to spend $100,000 on 22 lots of the vacant development to hold as a hedge against future needs, subject to approval from state authorities. The land was transferred to the City of Charleston in December 2011; it has been used as Corrine Jones Playground since.

== Municipal ownership ==
In late 2011, a renovation of the park was begun with the neighborhood surrounding it raising $20,000 of the expected $95,000.

The City of Charleston was interested in ensuring that the park would remain public green space after the Charleston County School District planned to erect portable classrooms on the land during the renovations of a nearby school. As part of a land swap, Charleston transferred property that it owned adjacent to downtown schools to the school district, and the school district agreed to transfer Corrine Jones Playground to the city.
