= Gadsden Green Homes =

Housing complex, South Carolina

Coordinates: 32°47′23.4212″N 79°57′13.4028″W

Gadsden Green Homes is a housing complex located in the Westside neighborhood in Charleston, South Carolina. The name comes from the neighborhood which had been owned by Christopher Gadsden. The housing project was built in two stages: the eastern half (bounded by Line St. to the north, President St. to the east, Bogard and Allway Sts. to the south, and Flood St. to the west) was constructed in 1942 while the western half (bounded by Line St. to the north, Flood St. to the east, Allway St. to the south, and Hagood Ave. to the west) was finished in 1968.

== Phase 1 ==
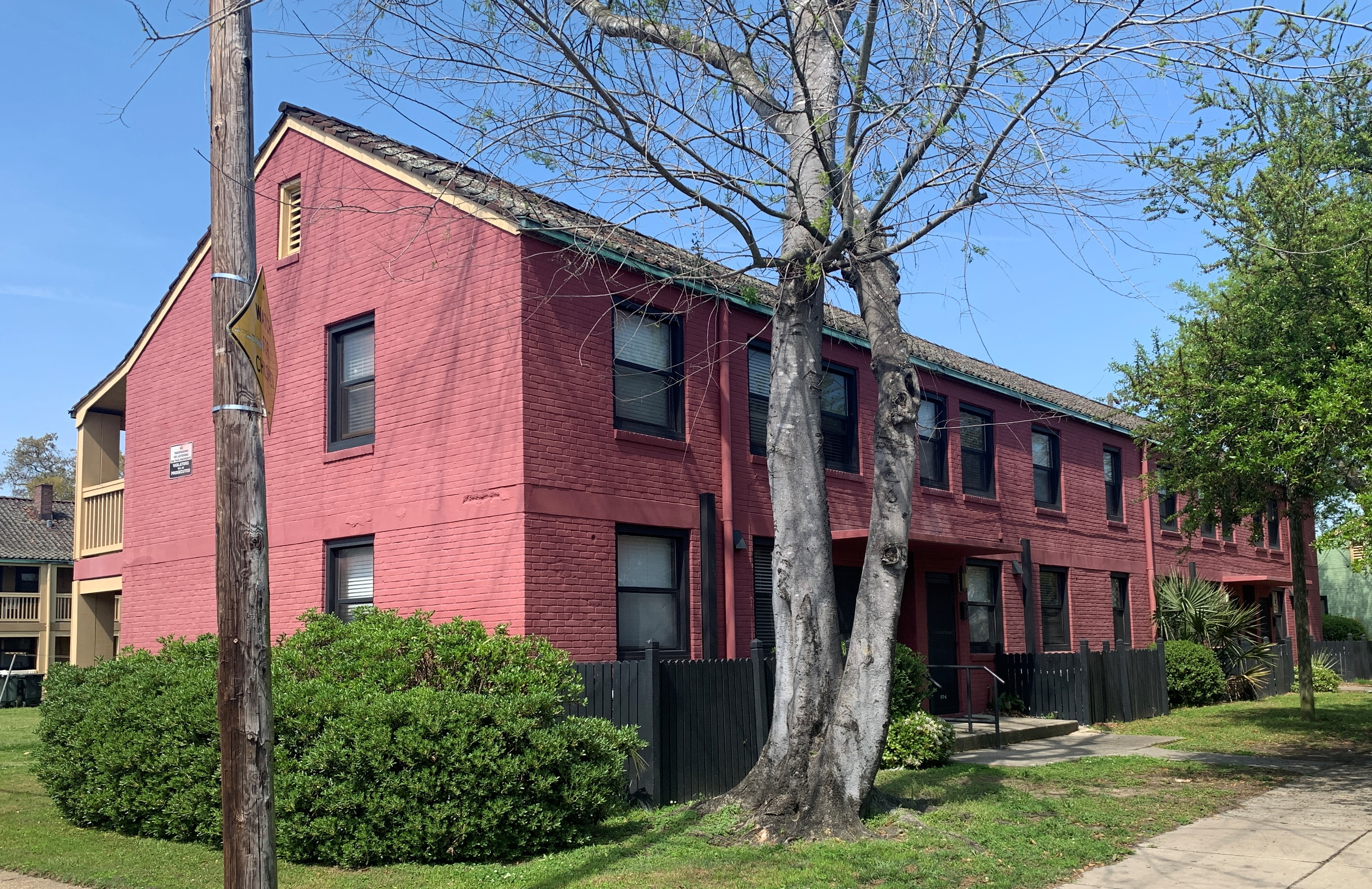
175-181 President St. are typical of the original phase of the development from 1942.

Planning for a new housing project, specifically for Black residents, began in 1939. Built during the segregation era, the housing project was the fourth in Charleston specifically for Black residents. The project was expected to cost about $700,000 following plans developed by Charleston Rehousing Architects (a firm made up of Douglas Ellington, David Hyer, Albert Simons, and Samuel Lapham VI).

A survey was undertaken of the area before deciding to proceed. The survey would help decide the location of the new project. In October 1940, the location of the housing project was announced; it would be bounded by President St., Bogard St., Allway St., Flood St., and Line St. as well as Harmon Field. Harold Tatum was the chief architect of the 172-unit housing project of two-story brick buildings with tile roofs. In June 1941, the Housing Authority of Charleston obtained a building permit for the Gadsden Green project.

The paving around and through the project was paid for by the federal government to avoid taxing adjacent property owners for the cost of the paving.

On February 3, 1941, the Housing Authority released a solicitation for bids for the project to include all the materials, labor, and demolition of existing buildings. When the bids were opened on February 27, 1941, the proposal from Artley Co. of Savannah, Georgia was the lowest at $454,600 and was forwarded to authorities in Washington, D.C. for approval. The Artley Co. had previously built the Robert Mills Manor, Wragg Borough Homes, and Ansonborough Homes. The Housing Authority demolished 74 building to build the new complex. Of the structures to be demolished, 18 were two-story and 56 were one-story buildings.

== Phase 2 ==
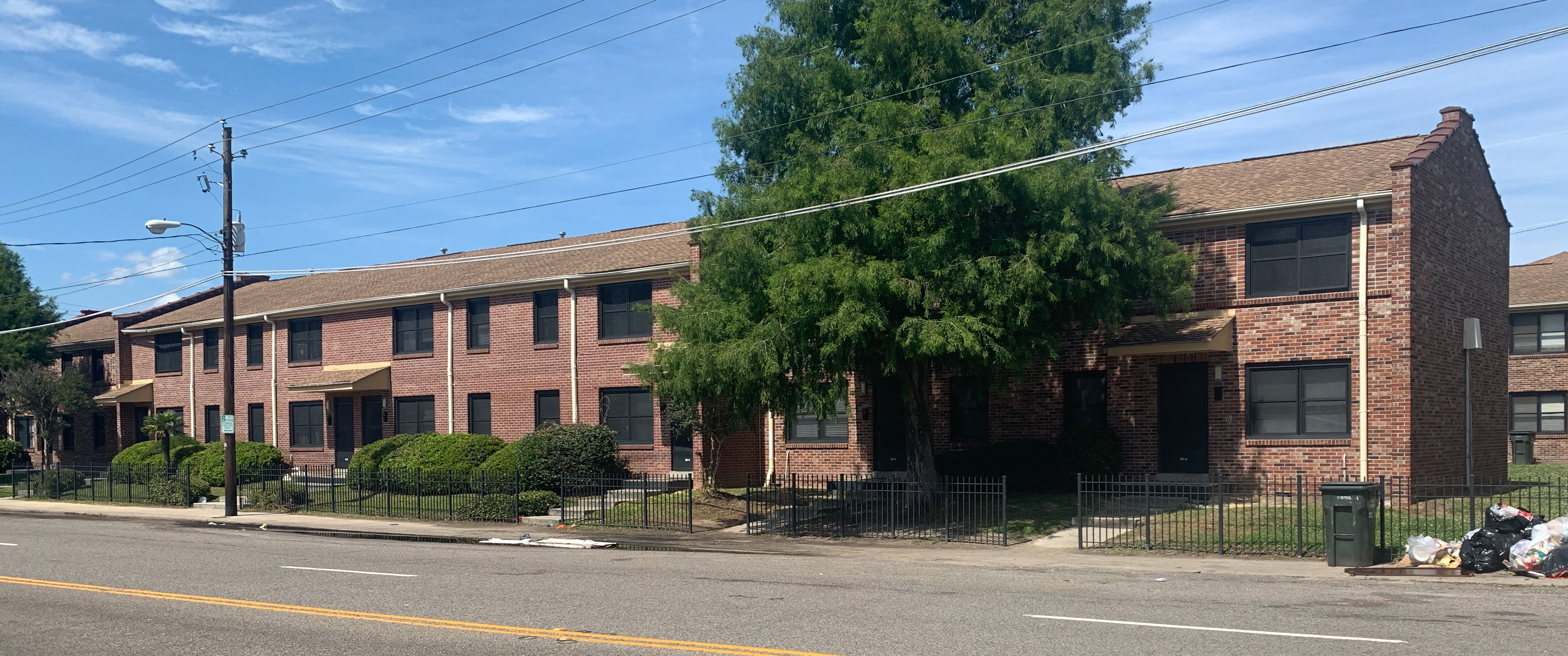
In 1968, ten buildings of housing were added to the west side of the existing project including 38 Hagood Ave.

Mayor Lockwood announced that the City would stop developing housing projects after Gadsden Green because the area had reached its saturation point; more projects, he said, would injure the property owners of the city. In 1966, however, the federal government paid for the extension for four housing projects including Gadsden Green; Gadsden Green was to be expanded westward between Line and Allway Sts. to include 10 new buildings with 92 units. Work on the expansion began in 1967. The expansion was opened on August 1, 1968.
