= South Carolina Memorial Garden =

- U.S. National Register of Historic Places
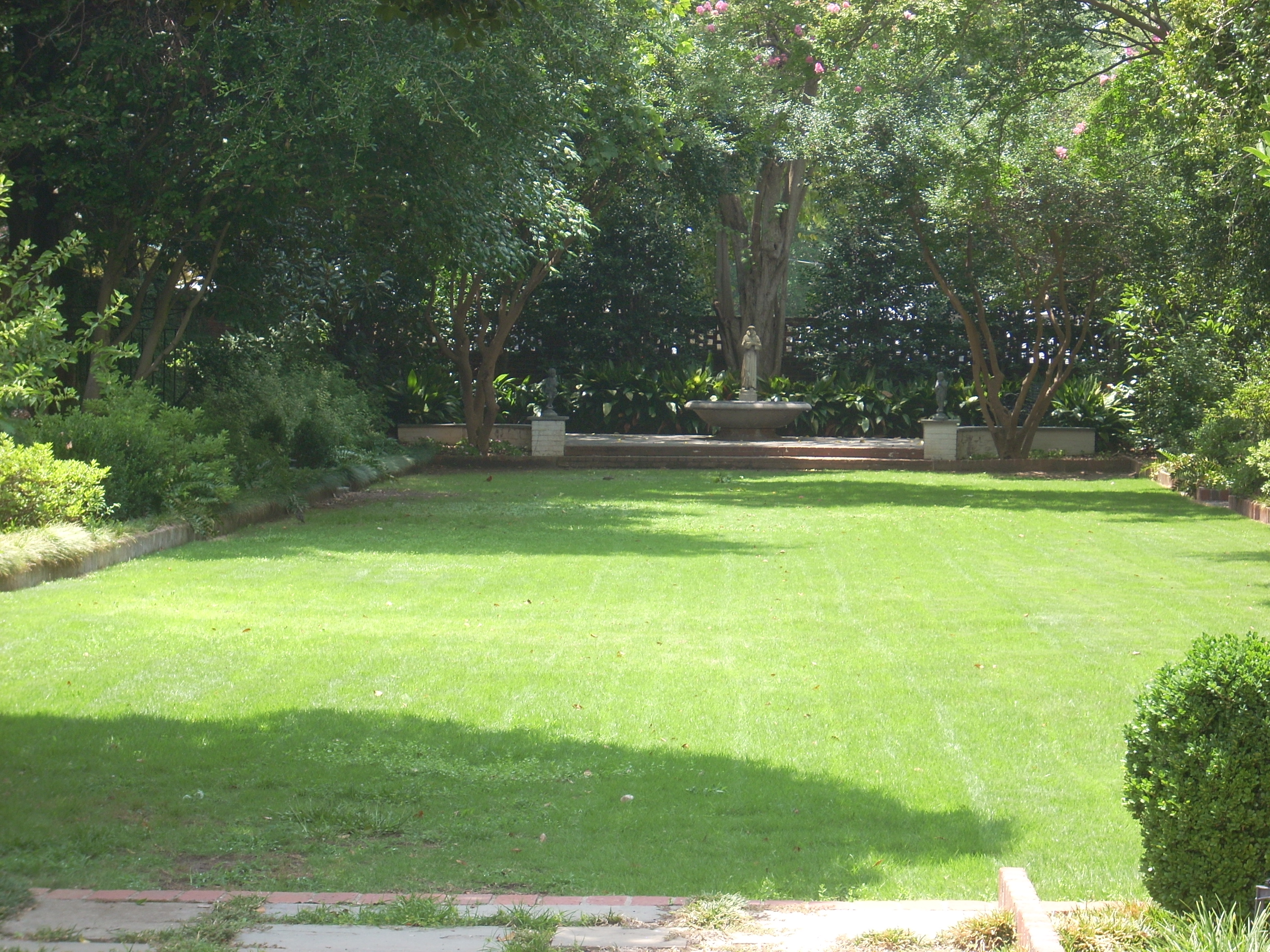
- South Carolina Memorial Garden, July 2012

- Location within South Carolina Location within the United States
- Location: 1919 Lincoln St., Columbia, South Carolina
- Coordinates: 34°00′34″N 81°02′36″W
- Area: Less than one acre
- Built: 1945-1957
- NRHP reference No.: 09000464
- Added to NRHP: April 2, 2012

South Carolina Memorial Garden is a historic memorial garden located at Columbia, South Carolina. It was established in 1944-1945 by the Garden Club of South Carolina. It was designed by noted landscape architect Loutrel W. Briggs (1893-1977). It includes a variety of ornamental plants and complementary design elements such as a gate house or tea room (1957), tool house or gardener's shed (1949-1951), walls (1948), gates (1948), walks, fountain terrace and fountain (1951-1952), sculpture (1952, 1954), and garden furniture. It was the first memorial garden sponsored by a state garden club in the United States that recognized veterans of World War II.

It was added to the National Register of Historic Places in 2012.
