= Music in Charleston =

As it has with every aspect of Charleston, South Carolina culture, the Gullah community has had a tremendous influence on Music in Charleston, especially when it comes to the early development of jazz music. In turn, the music of Charleston has had an influence on that of the rest of the country. The geechee dances that accompanied the music of the dock workers in Charleston followed a rhythm that inspired Eubie Blake's "Charleston Rag" and soon later James P. Johnson's "The Charleston", as well as the dance craze that defined a nation in the 1920s. "Ballin' the Jack", which was the popular dance in the years before "The Charleston", was written by native Charlestonian Chris Smith.

== Jazz ==
Charleston is a very important city when it comes to deciphering the history of jazz music, America's greatest art form. Charleston, SC is one of the early "incubators" of jazz, along with other southern cities such as New Orleans. Author and historian Jack McCray explains,

The beginnings of jazz music on the southeastern coast of the United States was centered in Charleston, South Carolina, one of only a handful of places in the Western Hemisphere where Africa interacted with Europe in a seminal way to produce New World culture. ... Charleston was the crown jewel of the British Empire before the American Revolution, and it was the North American cradle of the African slave trade, similar to other incubators on this side of the Atlantic Ocean, such as Havana, Cuba, and Salvador, Brazil. ... From enslaved African drummers, to black drummers attached to white militias, to military bands, to community brass bands, has come Charleston jazz.

No wonder Charleston musicians excelled at jazz. This port city is often referred to as the Ellis Island for African Americans. Estimates say upward of 40 percent of Africans imported into North America came through Charleston. For Charleston, jazz is like the distinctive taste of okra soup, the plaintive cries of the early 20th-century street vendors, and the meticulous artistry of sweetgrass baskets.

== The Jenkins Orphanage ==
The Jenkins Orphanage was established in 1891 by Rev. Daniel J. Jenkins in Charleston, South Carolina. Jenkins was a businessman and Baptist minister who encountered street children and decided to organize an orphanage for young African Americans. The orphanage took in donations of musical instruments and Rev. Jenkins hired local Charleston musicians and Avery Institute Graduates to tutor the boys in music. Upon its establishment, it became the only black instrumental group organized in South Carolina. Eventually the orphanage garnered such a reputation that some parents sent their children there to study music. As a result, Charleston musicians became proficient on a variety of instruments and were able to read music expertly. These traits set Jenkins musicians apart and helped land some of them positions in big bands with Duke Ellington and Count Basie. The children were not taught jazz, but often performed rags and ragtime versions of popular marches, introducing the distinctive swing to the music. Orphanages around the country began to develop brass bands in the wake of the Jenkins Orphanage Band's success. In the Colored Waifs' Home Brass Band in New Orleans, Louisiana, for example, a young trumpeter named Louis Armstrong first began to draw attention.

The Jenkins Orphanage Band, wearing discarded Citadel uniforms, performed throughout the United States and even toured England raising money for the support of the orphanage. It played in the inaugural parades of Presidents Theodore Roosevelt and William Taft. It appeared at the St. Louis Exposition and the Anglo-American Exposition in 1914. It toured the United States from coast to coast, and played in Paris, Berlin, Rome, London, and Vienna. As many as five bands were on tour during the 1920s. The band ceased to exist in the 1980s. William "Cat" Anderson, Jabbo Smith and Freddie Green are but a few of the alumni from the Jenkins Orphanage band who became professional musicians in some of the best bands of the day.

The Jenkins Orphanage Band also played on Broadway for the play Porgy by DuBose and Dorothy Heyward, a stage version of the novel by Dubose Heyward of the same title. The story was based in Charleston, South Carolina and featured the Gullah Community. The Heywards insisted on an African American cast for their play and hired the real Jenkins Orphanage Band to portray themselves on stage. Only a few years later, DuBose Heyward collaborated with George and Ira Gershwin to turn his novel in to the now famous opera, Porgy and Bess. George Gershwin spent the summer of 1934 at Folly Beach outside of Charleston writing the "folk opera." Porgy and Bess is considered the Great American Opera and is widely performed. Charleston's influence on the music of Porgy and Bess and therefore the American opera tradition is undeniable.

== Notable Musicians in Charleston ==
Charles Theodore Pachelbel was a resident of Charleston in the Colonial Era. Charles, the son of the more famous Johann Pachelbel, composer of the popular Canon in D, was an important musical figure in early Charleston and was one of the first European composers to take up residence in the American colonies. Pachelbel became the organist of St. Philip's Church in 1740 and lived in Charleston for the rest of his life. Another notable musician born in Charleston is country music and R&B star Darius Rucker, well known as the lead singer of Hootie & The Blowfish.

== Today ==
Today, organizations such as [Jazz Artists of Charleston] and the [Charleston Jazz Initiative] work to document, preserve, and promote Charleston's jazz history and legacy. The [Charleston Jazz Orchestra] is a big band that performs both traditional South Carolina jazz and original compositions. Charleston continues to have an active jazz scene and is home to musicians working in a variety of genres. The city's musical traditions have been influenced by a range of styles and cultural influences.
