= Louis Gourd House =

Coordinates: 32.771680°N 79.929575°W

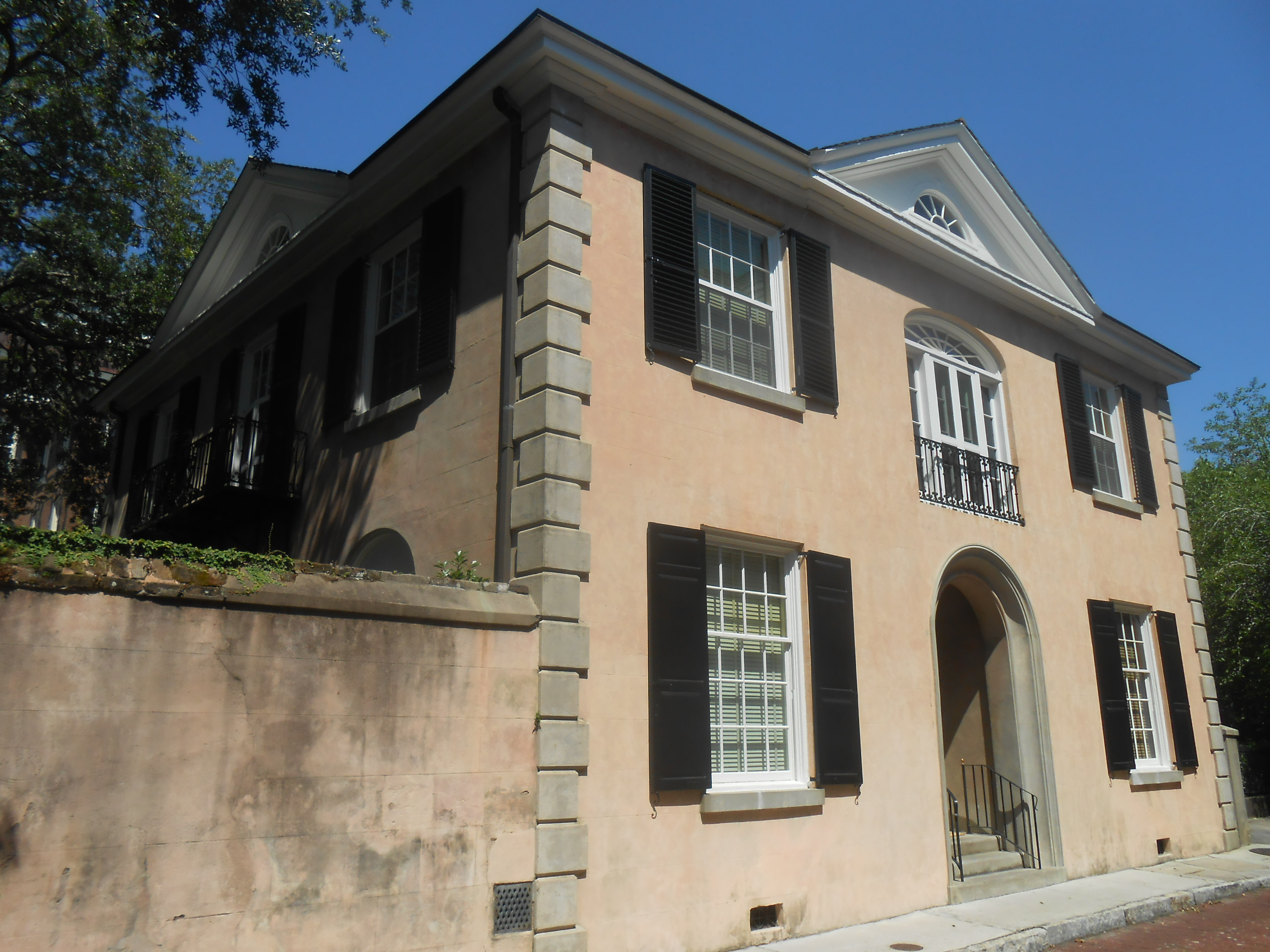
The Louis Gourd House stands at 19 Church Street in Charleston, South Carolina.

The Louis Gourd House is a Victorian house in Charleston, South Carolina which was once the carriage house of the Calhoun Mansion. The house, built in the 1870s, once included eight stalls, space for carriages, and servants' quarters, but the interior was entirely removed as part of the building's conversion into a residence. The Church Street portion of the lot was divided off from the Calhoun Mansion (facing on Meeting Street) and sold separately for the first time in 1932. When the building was acquired by Mr. and Mrs. Louis Gourd in 1939, they quickly hired Charleston architect Albert Simons to plan to remodeling of the building. The house he designed includes a main hall, living room, dining room, kitchen, gun room, and maid's quarters on the first floor with additional bedrooms and baths upstairs. Ironwork on the front and rear of the house was designed by Mr. Simons and includes his initials in the corners.
