= Meeting Street Manor =

Housing complex

Coordinates: 32°48′04″N 79°56′28″W

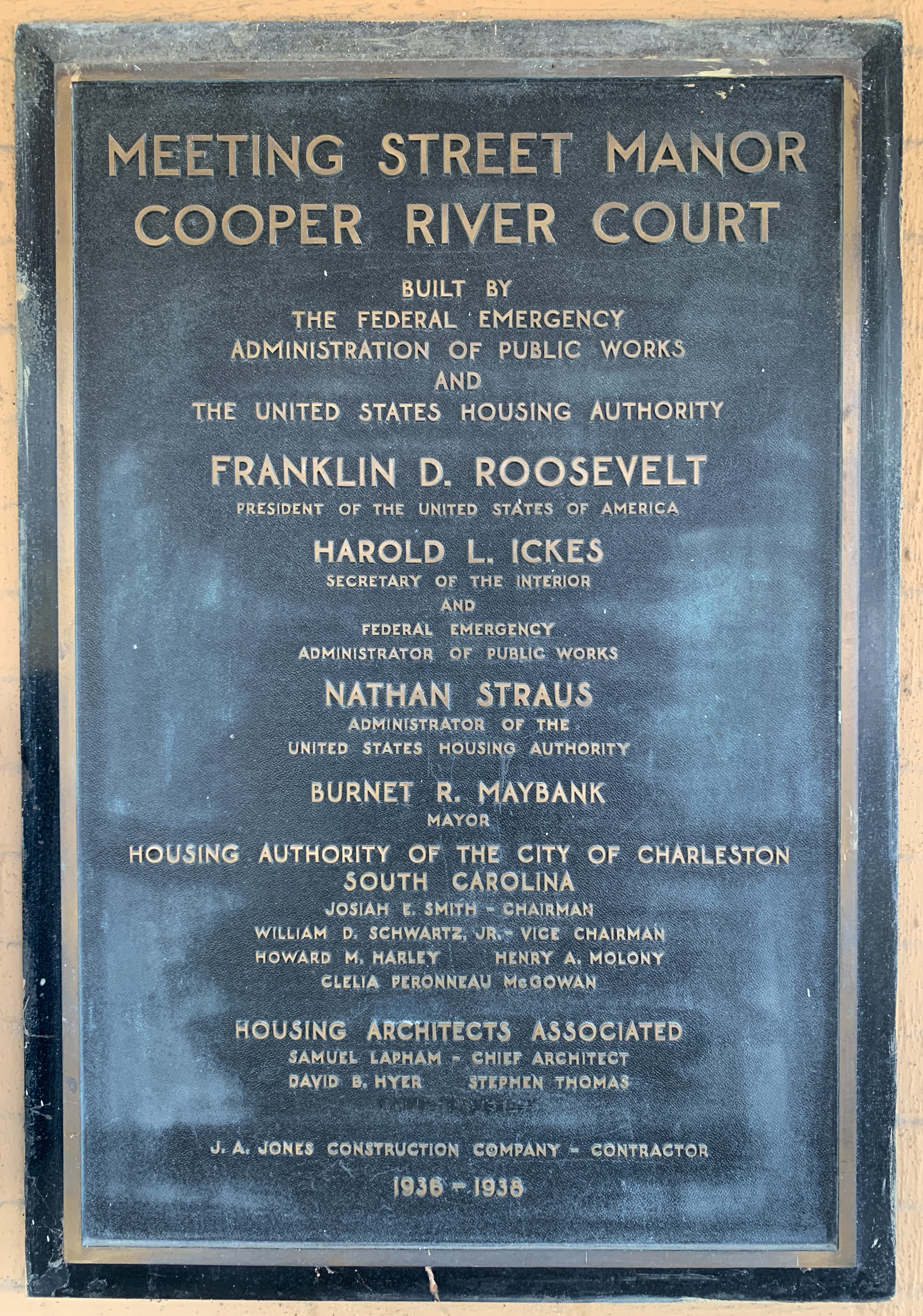
A plaque on the office names those involved in the project's construction.

Meeting Street Manor is a housing complex located in the upper Eastside in Charleston, South Carolina, and was the city's first housing development. When built in the 1930s, the development was technically two racially segregated halves with separate names. Since desegregation, both components are typically referred to as Meeting Street Manor, originally the name for the Whites-only portion.

== History ==
Originally, the City of Charleston had plans for a White and Black development in different parts of the city: The Black development was planned for upper Meeting St., and the White development was planned for Wagener Terrace. When the federal housing program could not fund both, Charleston installed both a White and Black development on upper Meeting St. but kept them as two distinct parts. In February 1936, the housing complex was going to be divided into two distinct parts based on the race of the residents: Meeting Street Manor was the section west of Hanover St. for white residents, while the portion between America and Hanover Sts. would be known as Cooper River View and devoted to black residents.

The city, however, did not give up its plans for a Whites-only housing project in Wagener Terrace and continued lobbying for the money in 1937. If approved, the housing project would have been be bounded by Grove St. (south), Ninth Ave. (west), St. Margaret St. (north), and Twelfth Ave. (east).

Although the city had considerable control over the planning of the development, the complex was owned by the federal government. The Public Works Administration had allotted $1,150,000 for the Upper Eastside developments. As reported in the News and Courier, "It is understood that the houses for white people will be superior in equipment to those for the negroes. There will be separate entrances to the developments, and they will be in no way connected." Originally, the Charleston Housing Authority had planned for a separate Whites-only complex at the western end of Grove St., but when deadlines were missed for federal backing of that development, the municipal authority chose to divide the Meeting St. complex to house both races. The White section would include 75 housing units, and the Black section would include 137 units.

The name of the two sections was criticized, with some Charlestonians suggesting Newmarket Village in honor of an early settlement in the area before the city annexed it. Some criticized the use of "Manor" in the title as being inconsistent with its low-income status. One comment suggested "Ethiopia on the Cooper" for the portion devoted to Black residents.

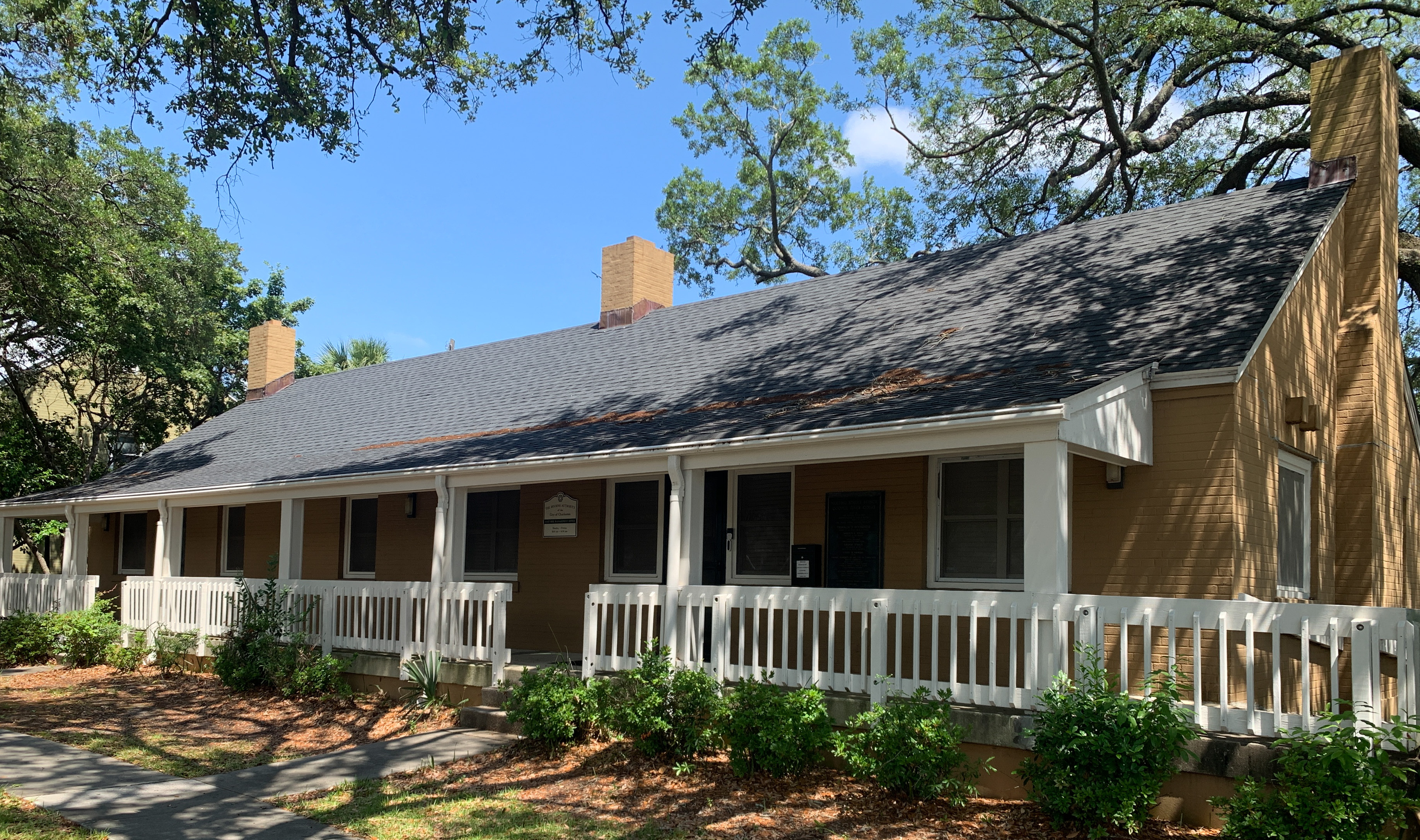
The main office is located in Unit A.

Tidewater Construction Co. of Norfolk, Virginia, was the contractor for the foundation work. Work began on March 18, 1936, with about 150 locals performing the work.

In January 1937, the development was 50% complete, and applications had been received for housing. The development opened on August 1, 1937, with 35 families moving in immediately. Rent (excluding electricity) varied depending on the size of the units and whether the rental was in the White or Black half, but prices ranged from $15.50 per week for a two-room unit to $24.50 for a five-room unit in Meeting Street Manor. In Cooper River Court, rents for the same options were $2.40 to $3.80.

In 1950, housing officials selected an adjacent area to expand the Cooper River Court portion of the development. The area would be bounded by America St. (east), Johnson St. (south), Stuart St. (north), and Hanover St. (west). Some units would also be added near East Bay St. The extension would include 216 units.

In 2021, the Charleston Housing Authority announced plans to demolish many housing projects to rebuild larger complexes, but some historic developments such as the Robert Mills Manor and Meeting Street Manor were to be spared based on their solid construction: "They're built like bomb shelters," said the director of the Housing Authority.

== Architecture ==
In all, the project would include 33 brick and tile-roofed buildings (30 residential buildings, 2 social and administrative buildings, and 1 service building) designed by Samuel Lapham, David B. Hyer, and Stephen Thomas.

The contract for the buildings was awarded to J.A. Jones Construction Co. of Charlotte, North Carolina.

The buildings would be almost entirely fireproof.

Loutrel Briggs was the landscaper for the project, and his plans were executed by Harkey Bros., Inc. of Charlotte, North Carolina. Palmettos were planted on the east-west streets, and oaks were used on the north-south streets.
