= Wragg Borough Homes =

Coordinates: 32.793189°N 79.934109°W

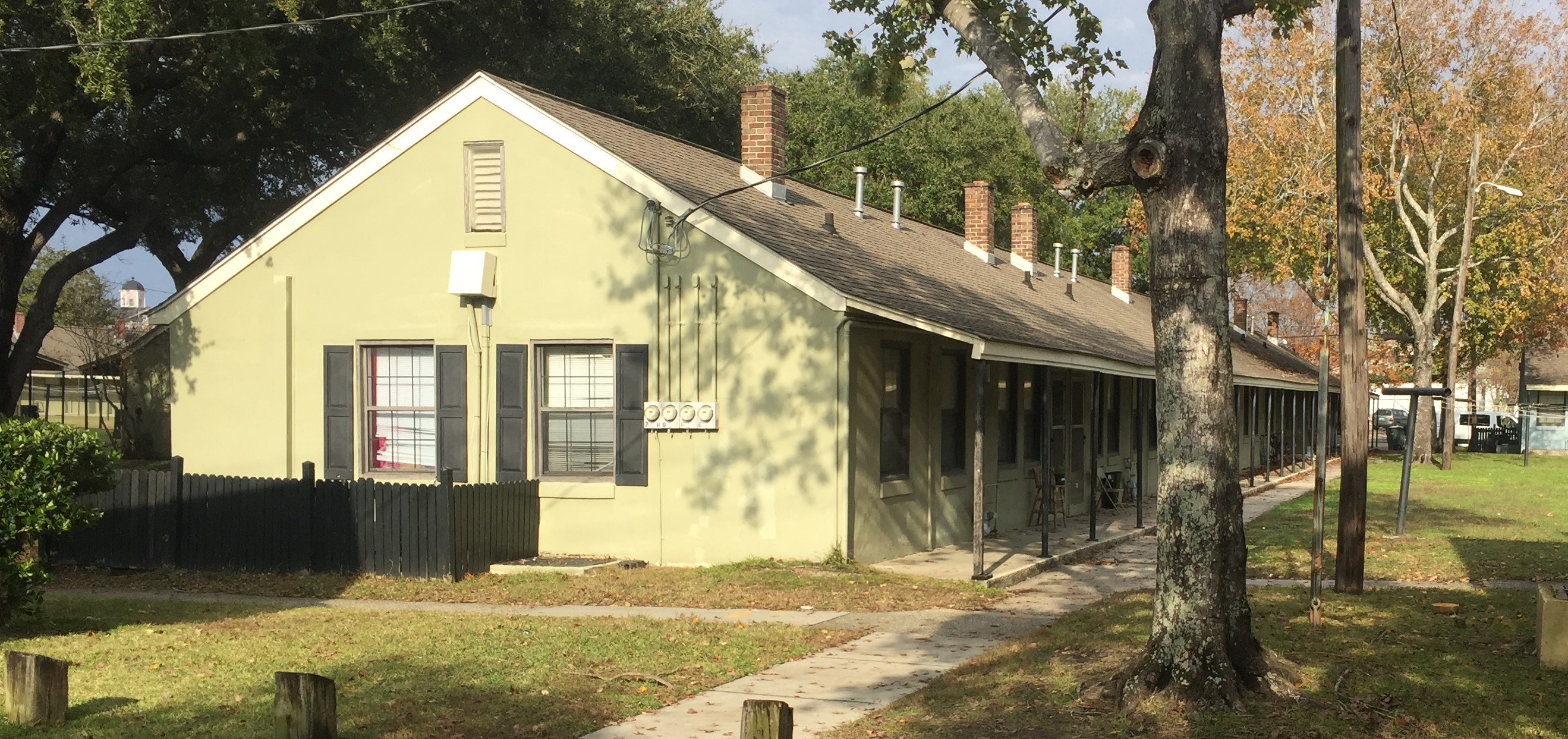
132 Alexander Street, Charleston, South Carolina

The Wragg Borough Homes is a public housing project in Charleston, South Carolina. It is bounded by Drake Street (to the east), Chapel Street (to the south), America and Elizabeth Streets (to the west), and South Street (to the north).

The land for the development was acquired in 1939. Before the integration of public facilities, the housing project was meant only for the city's Black residents while the Robert Mills Manor was meant for White residents. The new housing was expected to cost only $2.30 a month for rent per room.

Bids for the construction of the housing was due December 11, 1939, for the 128 single-story housing units. The new project was called the Wragg Borough Homes in honor of Samuel Wragg, the previous owner of most of the property. The lowest bid was submitted by the Artley Company of Savannah, Georgia, the same contractor which was building the Robert Mills Manor. The contract approved totaled $344,000.

Wraggborough Homes

Construction could not begin until housing was available in another development, the Ansonborough Homes, so that those whose houses were being demolished for the new project could be temporarily relocated. To make way for the development, 134 housing units were demolished. A building permit for $3000 of demolition work was pulled in March 1940.

A contract for landscaping was awarded to the Carolina Floral Company based on its bid of $9225. Loutrel Briggs was the landscape architect for the plans.

The first 18 units were completed in July 1940.
