= Francis Kline =

3rd Abbot of Mepkin Abbey

Francis Kline, OCSO was an American Trappist monk who served as the third abbot of Mepkin Abbey from 1990 until his death on August 27, 2006.

Prior to entering the Trappists' Abbey of Our Lady of Gethsemani in Kentucky, Kline was a 1959 graduate of St Joseph’s Preparatory School in Philadelphia as well as the Juilliard School in New York, where he was a skilled organist.

He was deeply involved in environmental conservation and historic preservation efforts in South Carolina. Under his leadership, Mepkin Abbey played a significant role in protecting the Cooper River corridor. He worked closely with conservation organizations, state agencies, and private landowners to secure protections for land along the Cooper River. As co-chair of the Cooper River Task Force, he facilitated discussions between various stakeholders to preserve open spaces in Berkeley County.

Under Kline’s leadership, Mepkin Abbey donated a 3,120 acres (1,260 ha) conservation easement to Ducks Unlimited, ensuring the permanent protection of its land along the Cooper River from development. He was also instrumental in negotiations with MeadWestvaco Corporation, which led to the South Carolina Department of Natural Resources acquiring the 10,712 acres (4,335 ha) Bonneau Ferry tract, protecting a significant portion of the 30,000 acres (12,000 ha) Cooper River Historic District.

Following his passing, the South Carolina Department of Natural Resources Board issued a resolution on October 20, 2006, honoring his contributions as both a spiritual leader and conservation advocate. Governor Mark Sanford praised him as a key figure in uniting competing interests to preserve the Cooper River region, stating, "He was someone that just had a remarkable level of personal grace in the way he handled himself; he was able to have this incredibly deep well of spirituality and the ability to look deeply at ideas of faith, and then this ability to care about what was happening in the world around him."

Following his death in 2006, Kline was buried at Mepkin Abbey in Moncks Corner, South Carolina.

Preceded by Fr. Christian Carr	Abbot of Mepkin Abbey; 1990–2006	Succeeded by Fr. Stan Gumula
