= Mepkin Abbey =

Trappist monastery in Berkeley County, South Carolina

- Interactive map of Mepkin Abbey

Monastery information
- Order: Trappist
- Archdiocese: Archdiocese of Atlanta
- Diocese: Diocese of Charleston

People
- Abbot: Gerard-Jonas Palmares, OCSO
- Archbishop: Gregory John Hartmayer
- Bishop: Jacques E. Fabre

Site
- Location: Moncks Corner, South Carolina
- Country: United States
- Coordinates: 33°7′N 79°57′W
- Website: https://mepkinabbey.org/

Mepkin Abbey is a Trappist monastery in Berkeley County, South Carolina, United States. The abbey is located near Moncks Corner, at the junction of the two forks of the Cooper River northwest of Charleston, and is located in the Diocese of Charleston.

== History ==
The area has been known as Mepkin for centuries, dating back to the Native American tribes who lived in the area. The first record of the name was a 1681 grant to the sons of Sir John Coleton, one of the Lords Proprietary of South Carolina. In 1762, one of his descendants sold the land to Henry Laurens of Charleston. Laurens built his home there, and it was known as the Mepkin Plantation.

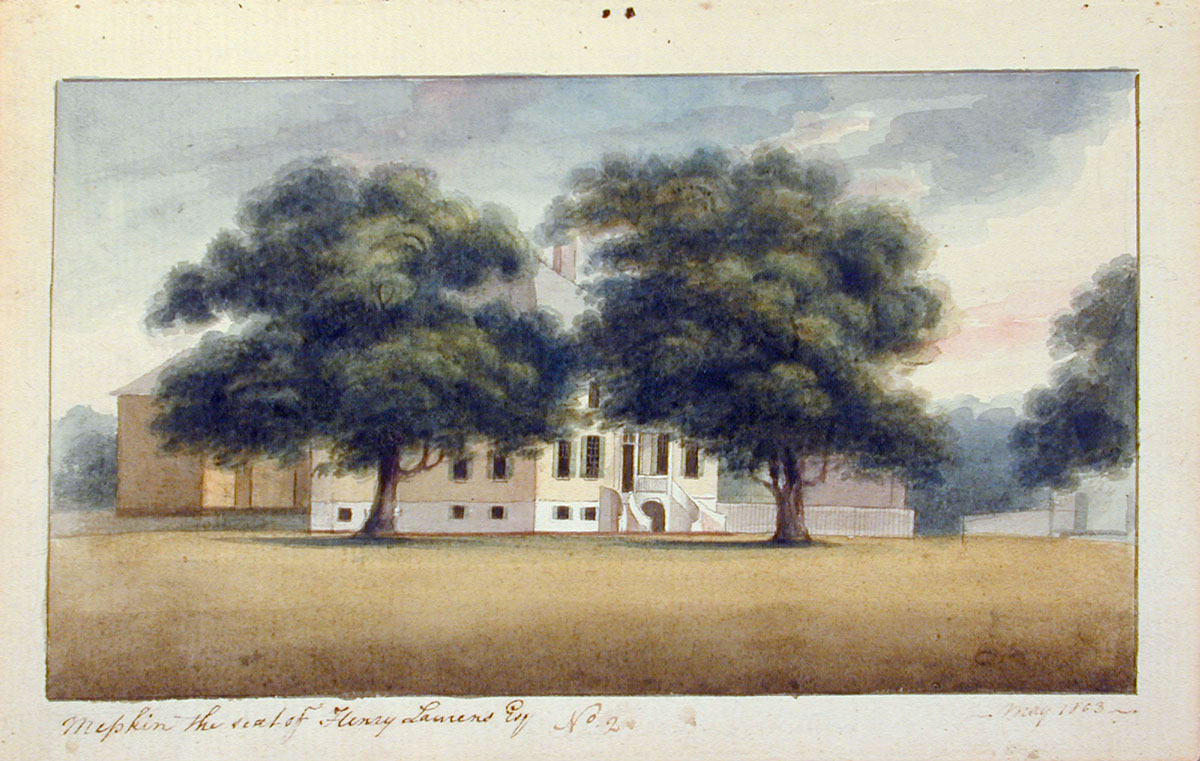
Charles Fraser, Mepkin, the Seat of Henry Laurens, Esq., May 1803

After a few generations, the Laurens family sold the property, and it passed through several hands. In 1936 the well-known publisher Henry R. Luce bought the property. The plantation, which was created from several smaller plantations, contained over 7,200 acres (2,900 ha) when Luce bought the property for a reported $150,000. When the Luces bought the plantation, Laurnes' house was already gone; the then-current house had been built in 1906. New York architect Edward Durell Stone traveled to Mepkin in 1936 to design a new house for the Luces. Henry's wife, Clare Boothe Luce, commissioned and built an extensive landscape garden there known as the Mepkin Garden. In 1949 the Luces donated a large part of the property, including the garden, to the Trappist Order's Gethsemani Abbey.

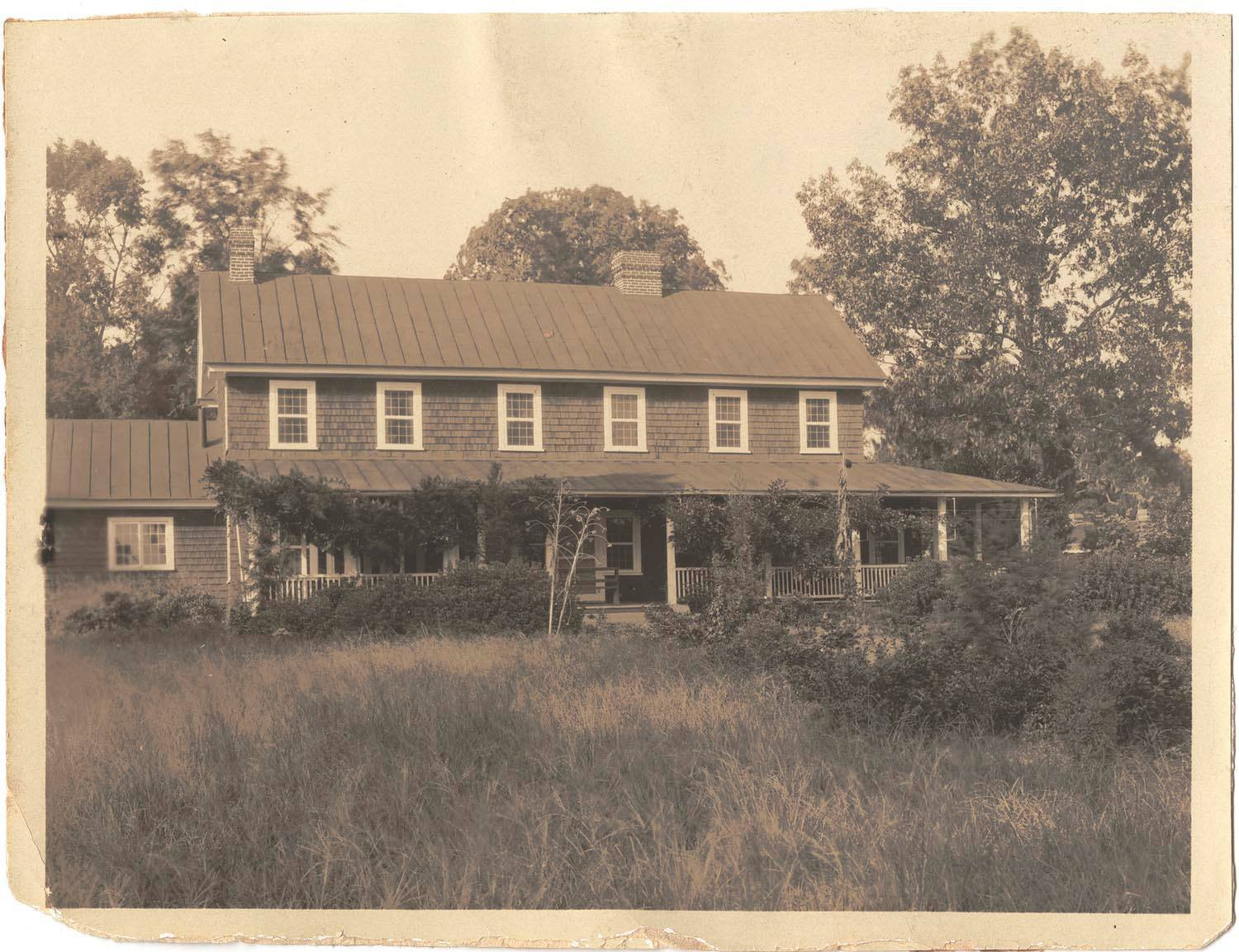
After the historic house of Henry Laurens was gone, this house was built in 1906 and remained until being itself replaced in the 1930s by Henry Luce.

Twenty-nine monks of the Order of Cistercians of the Strict Observance (Trappists) came from Gethsemani, Kentucky, to found the new Mepkin Abbey. With a few limitations, the Abbey and the Mepkin Gardens are open to the public on a daily basis. The monastery grounds include a graveyard containing the ashes of Henry Laurens, as well as the graves of John Laurens, Clare Boothe Luce, and Henry Luce. Its gardens are now known as the Mepkin Abbey Botanical Garden.

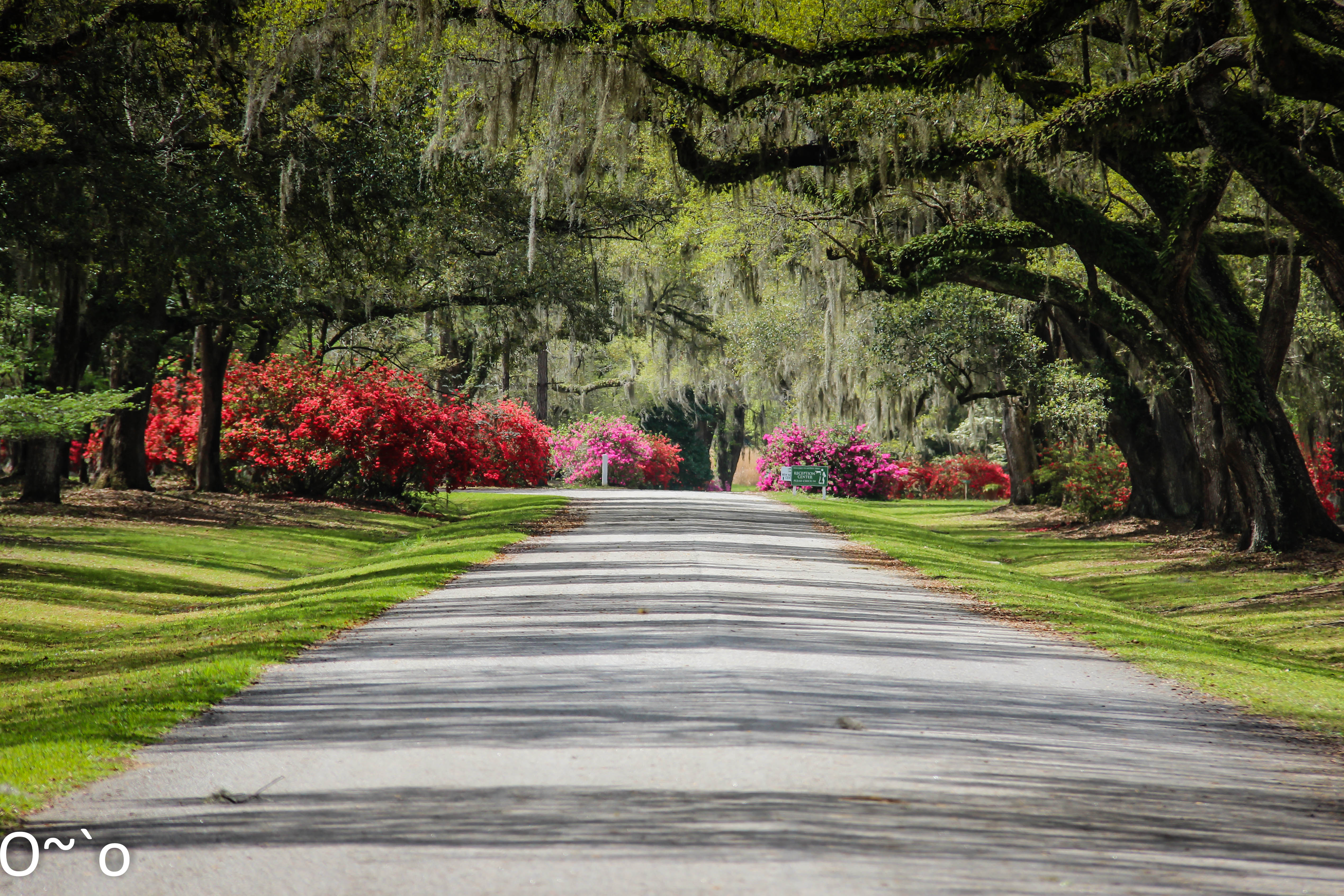
Mepkin Abbey entrance
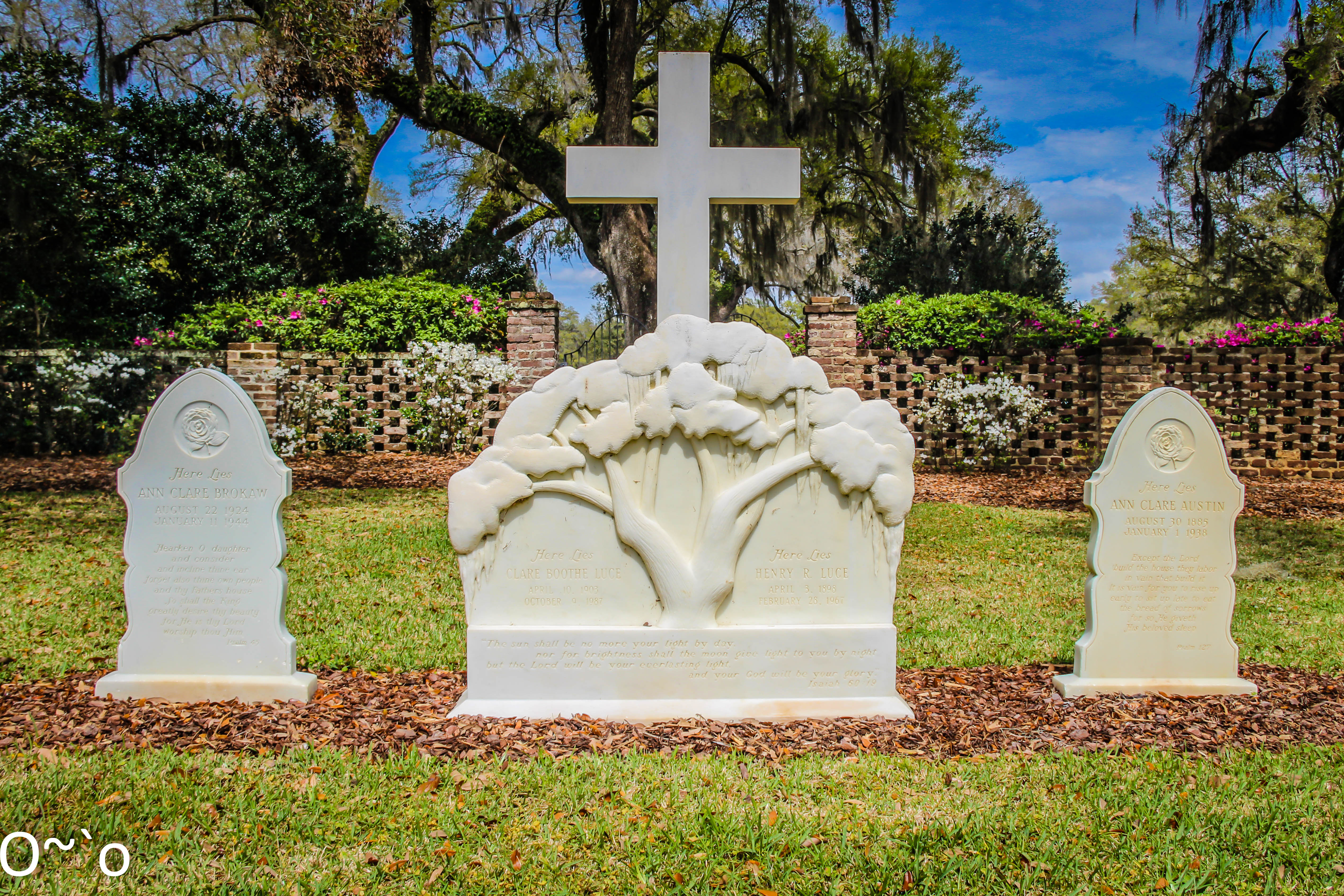
Mepkin Abbey

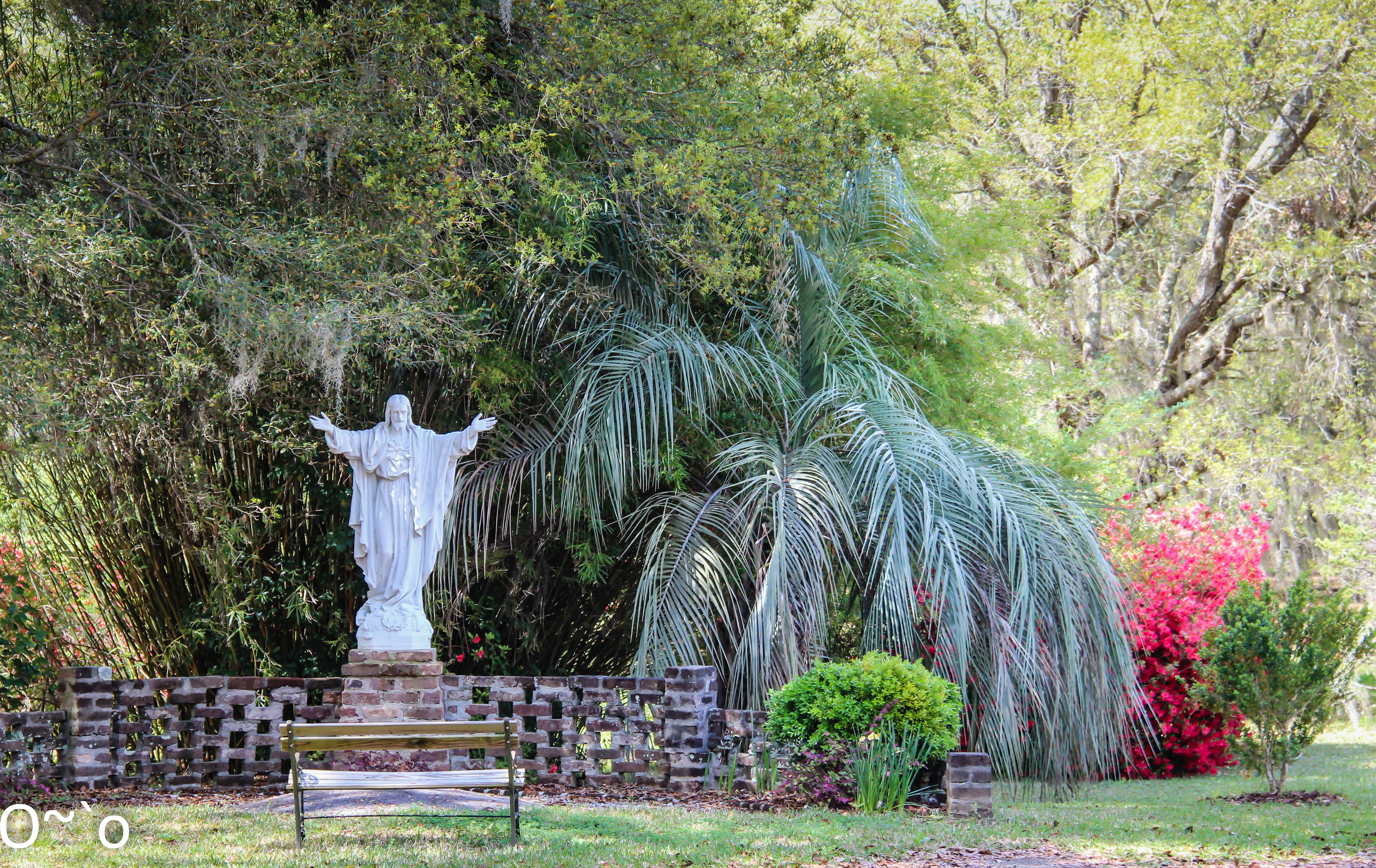
Mepkin Abbey

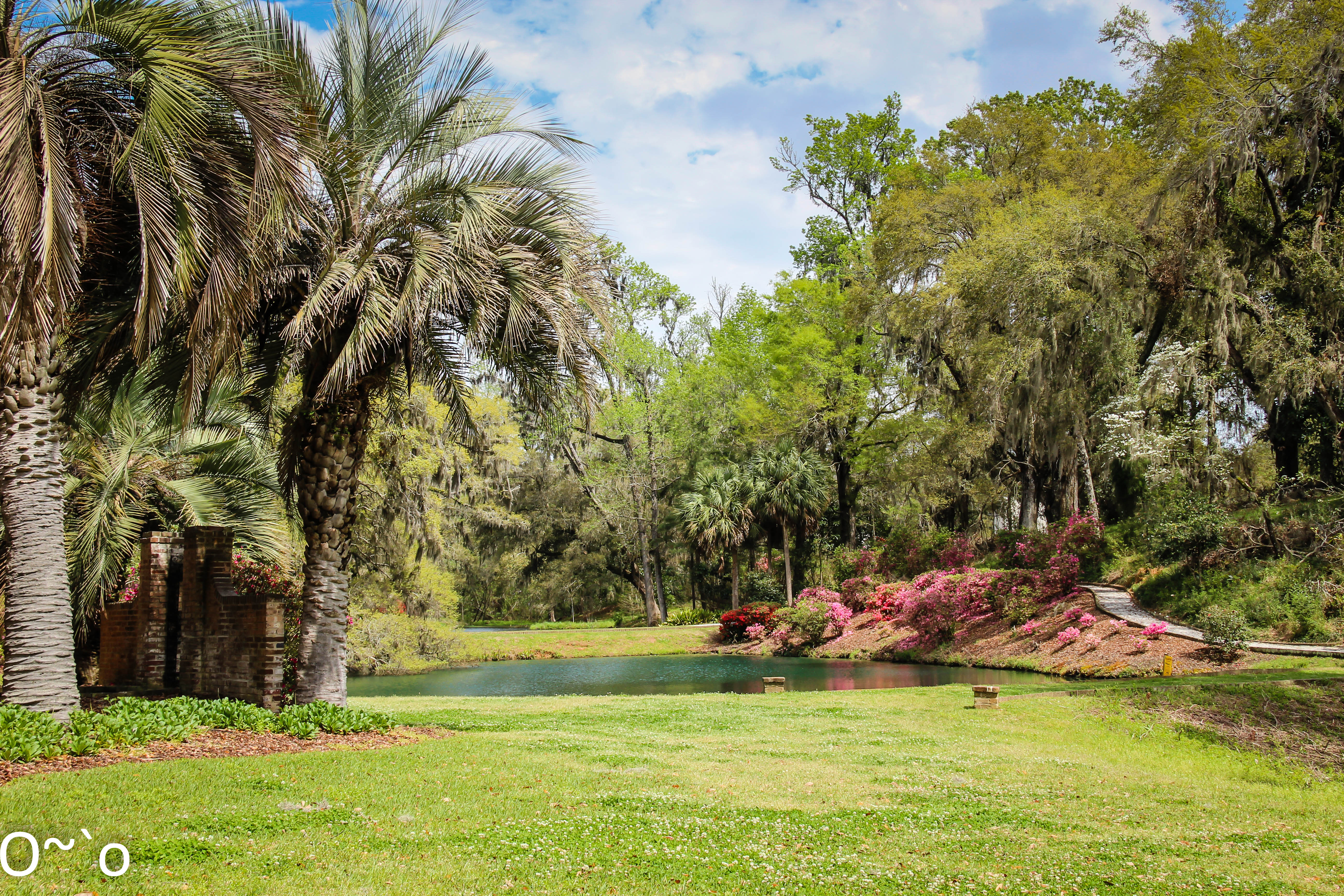
Mepkin Abbey

=== Egg farming ===
In February 2007, People for the Ethical Treatment of Animals released video of Mepkin Abbey's battery cage egg operation, showing debeaked hens crowded inside battery cages and a monk discussing the practice of forced molting. PETA cited earlier statements by Pope Benedict XVI on factory farming, in which the pontiff criticized the "industrial use of creatures, so that geese are fed in such a way as to produce as large a liver as possible, or hens live so packed together that they become just caricatures of birds" as being incompatible with Biblical teachings on animals. Mepkin Abbey defended itself by citing their compliance with the animal welfare standards of the United Egg Producers. It was discovered shortly after the release of the video that many scenes shown in the video, such as those of dead chickens of the floor, were actually shot at a separate facility rather than at Mepkin Abbey. In December 2007, Mepkin announced on its website that it would phase out the egg production operation which had been its main income, citing the concerns and its disturbance of their monastic way of life. They eventually decided on a mushroom production operation.

== Botanical Garden ==
The grounds began as the Mepkin Plantation, home of American patriot Henry Laurens. The house itself was burned by British forces during the American Revolutionary War and again by the Union army in the Civil War. Today's garden was established as landscape gardens on the country estate of noted publisher Henry R. Luce and his wife Clare Boothe Luce (who are buried on the site). The grounds feature live oaks and a camellia garden designed by landscape architect Loutrel Briggs. The garden is open to the public daily except Mondays.

== Leaders ==
=== Abbots/Superiors ===
Years	Abbot
1949–1974	Anthony Chassagne
1974–1989	Christian Carr
1990–2006	Francis Kline
2007–2018	Stanislaus Gumula
2018–2026	Joseph Tedesco
2026-Present	Gerard-Jonas Palmares

== See also ==
- List of botanical gardens in the United States
