= Williams Mansion =

Historic house in Charleston, SC USA

Coordinates: 32.771532°N 79.930034°W

The Williams Mansion
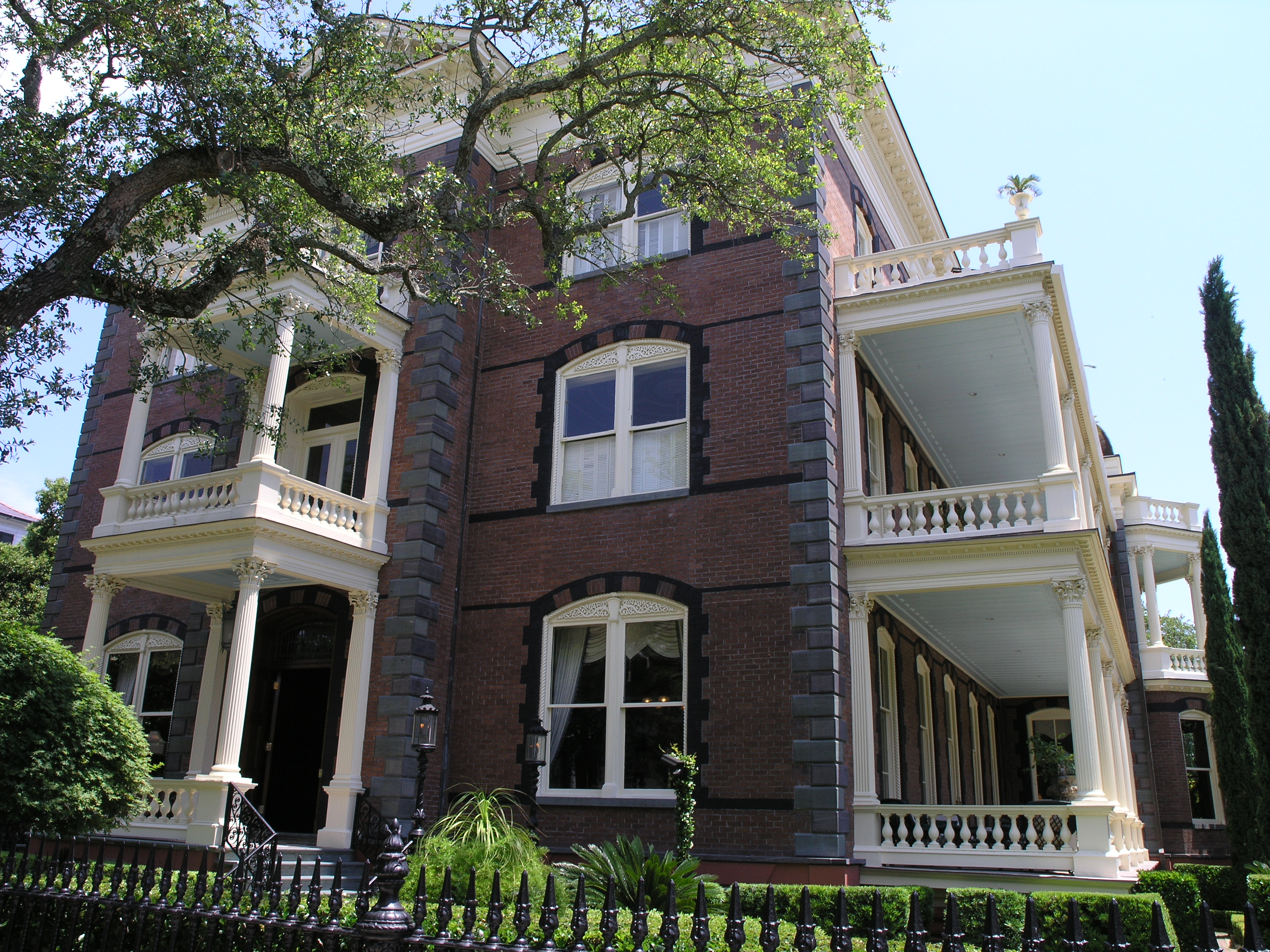

- Location within South Carolina
- Location: 16 Meeting St., Charleston, South Carolina

History
- Built: W.P. Russell
- Built for: George W. Williams

Site notes
- Architectural style: Italianate
- Governing body: Private

The Williams Mansion (formerly called the Calhoun Mansion) is a Victorian house at 16 Meeting St., Charleston, South Carolina. The mansion is open for public tours.

== History ==
George W. Williams bought the "Lowndes Lot" on Meeting Street and already had plans for a large house with attached conservatory, a hot house, extensive gardens, and an observatory atop the main house by 1873. The house was built in 1875 and 1876 for George W. Williams, a businessman, according to plans drawn by W.P. Russell by the Devereux Brothers as contractors. The cornerstone was laid April 26, 1875.

The 24,000-square-foot house has thirty main rooms and many more smaller rooms. The main hall is 50 feet long and 14 feet wide. The house has a ballroom with a 45-foot-high ceiling.

When Williams died, in 1903, his house was inherited by his son-in-law, Patrick Calhoun, a grandson of John C. Calhoun. It was from his ownership that the house derived its common name, the Calhoun Mansion. It opened as a hotel starting in 1914.

In 1932, the rear portion of the property, which faces on Church Street to the east, was subdivided, and the original stables and servants' quarters were converted into the Louis Gourd House.

Attorney Gedney Howe and his wife, Patricia, bought the house in 1976 and undertook a restoration. In 2000, Mr. Howe put the house up for sale, but it was still unsold by 2004, when he opted to advertise it for auction to occur on May 25, 2004. Before the auction, however, a private sale was arranged to lawyer and preservationist Howard H. Stahl. It currently is used to house and display Mr. Stahl's extensive collection of artifacts from the Gilded Age.

In 2020, the home officially returned to its original name, the Williams Mansion. The owner stated he wished to avoid any implication that John C. Calhoun lived in the home. The change came shortly after the nearby John C. Calhoun Monument was removed from Marion Square due to the monument's connection to white supremacy.

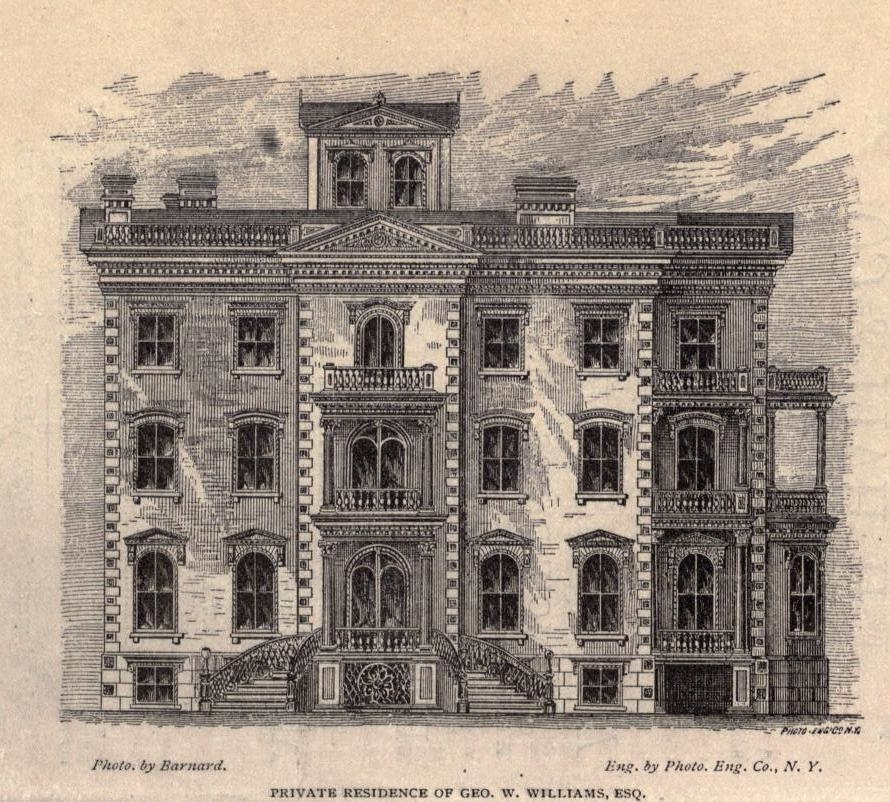
George W. Williams' new house appeared in an illustrated guide to Charleston in 1875.

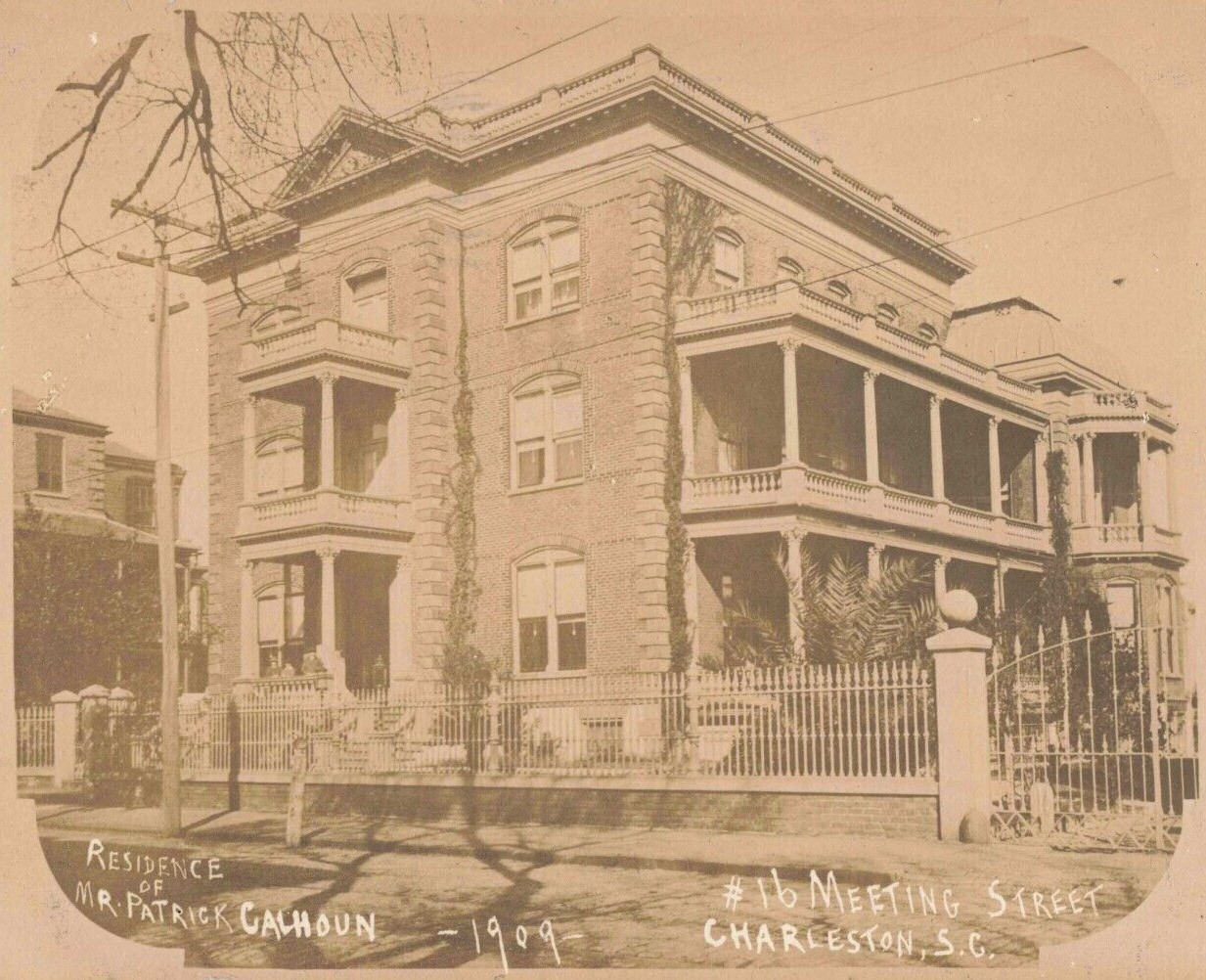
The house was shown in a 1909 postcard as the home of Patrick Calhoun.

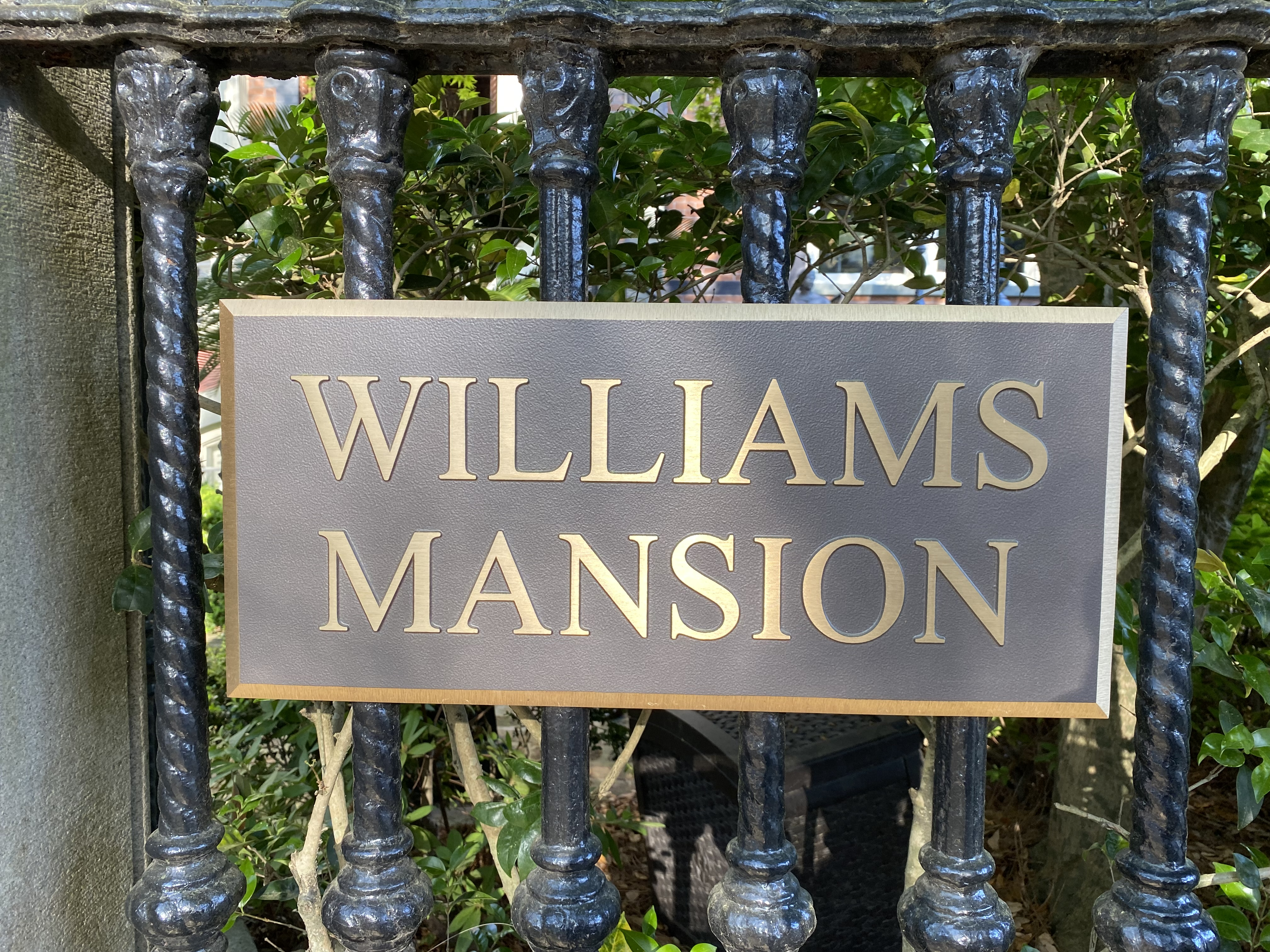
The sign for the Williams Mansion

== In popular culture ==
The house and grounds have appeared in ABC's mini-series North and South as the Hazards' mansion.

It also appears in Gunfight at Branson Creek movie.

The interior was used for indoor shots of the Hamiltons' summer house in The Notebook.
