= United States Marine Hospital (Charleston, South Carolina) =

- Old Marine Hospital
- U.S. National Register of Historic Places
- U.S. National Historic Landmark
- U.S. National Historic Landmark District – Contributing property
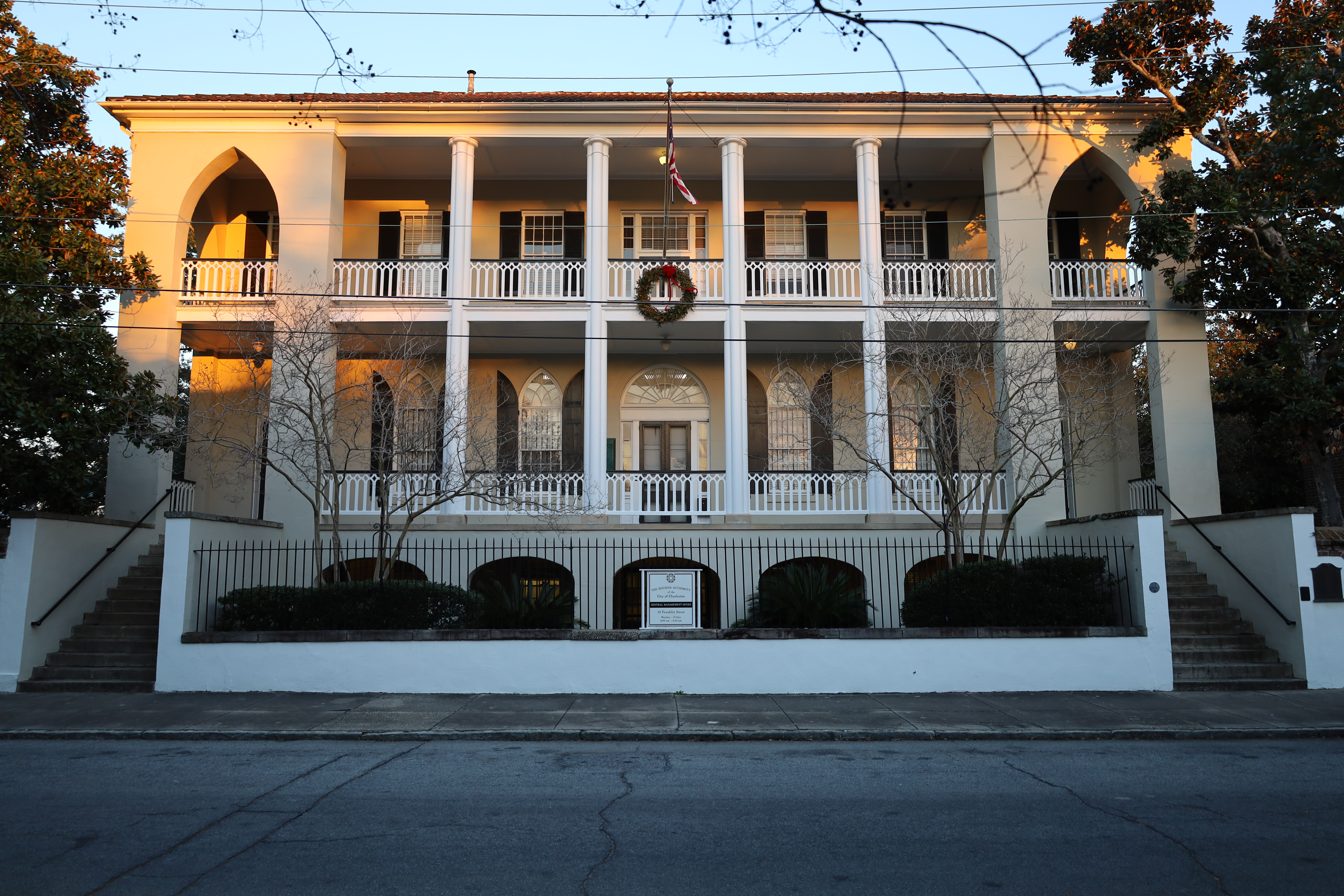
- Old Marine Hospital in Charleston in 2021

- Location within South Carolina Location within the United States
- Location: 20 Franklin St., Charleston, South Carolina
- Coordinates: 32°46′40″N 79°56′13.7″W
- Area: .75 acres (0.30 ha)
- Built: 1833
- Architect: Robert Mills
- Architectural style: Gothic Revival
- Part of: Charleston Historic District (ID66000964)
- NRHP reference No.: 73001690

Significant dates
- Added to NRHP: November 7, 1973
- Designated NHL: November 7, 1973
- Designated NHLDCP: October 9, 1960

The Old Marine Hospital is a historic medical building at 20 Franklin Street in Charleston, South Carolina. Built 1831–33 to a design by Robert Mills, it was designated a National Historic Landmark in 1973 for its association with Mills, and as a high-quality example of Gothic Revival architecture. The hospital was built as a public facility for the treatment of sick sailors and other transient persons.

== Description ==
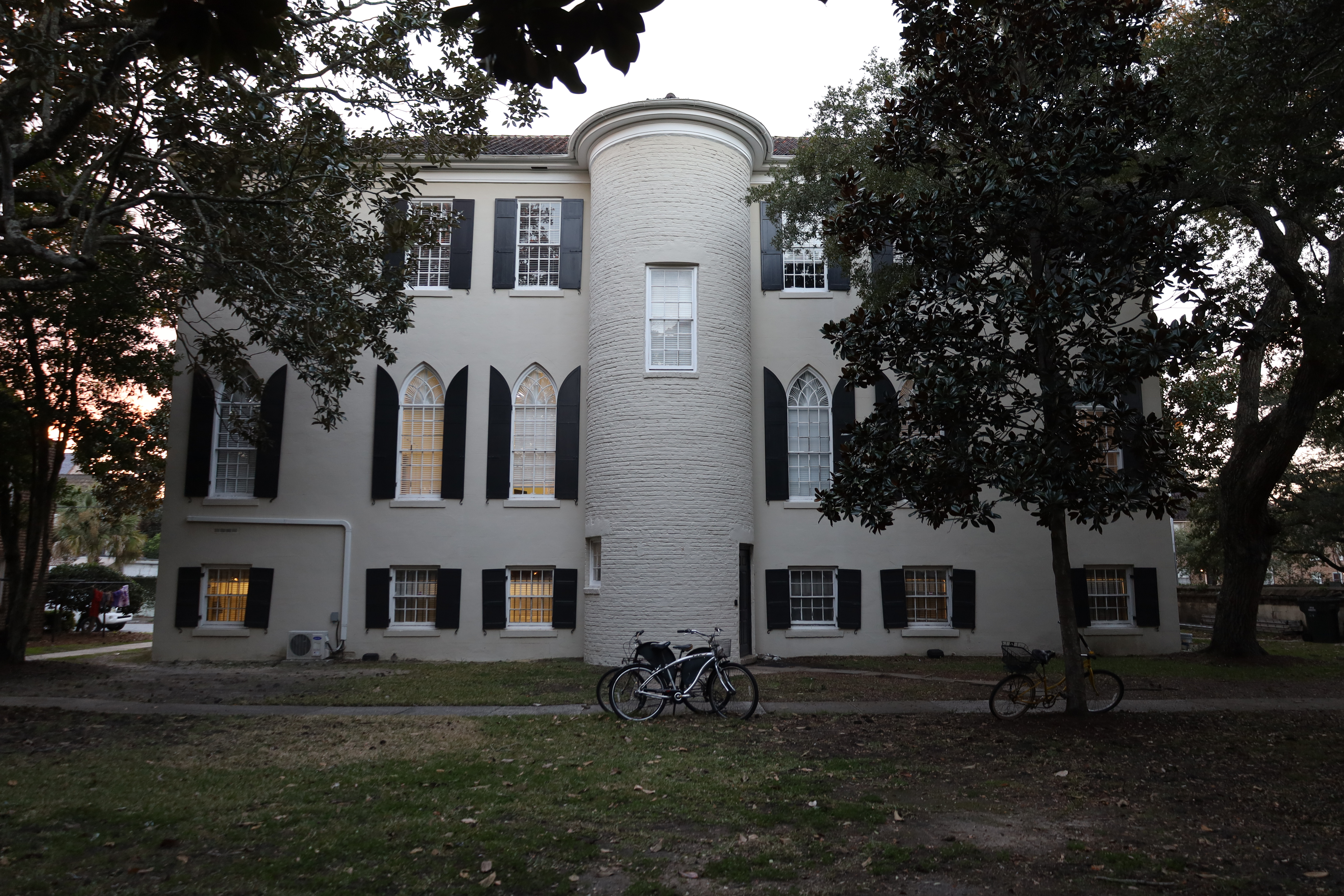
Rear of the building in 2021

The Old Marine Hospital is located in the historic center of Charleston, on the east side of Franklin Street, just south of the Old Charleston Jail. It is a two-story masonry structure, with a hip roof and a raised, arcaded basement that is a characteristic Mills element. A two-story porch extends across the seven-bay facade, with entrances to the porch at the end bays, which have two-story Gothic arches. The porch bays are articulated by clusters of columns, and the iron railings also have a Gothic motif. The main entrance is at the center of the facade, with flanking bays containing tall Gothic windows. When originally built, the building had two long wings extending from its rear; these were damaged by fire and removed during restoration work.

== History ==
The City of Charleston undertook its operation in 1834, charging arriving ships a fee to support its operation. During the Civil War, it was used for Confederate forces as well as seamen. It was badly damaged by Union bombardment.

From 1866 to 1870, the Episcopal Church ran a school for African American children. In March 1893, Rev. D.J. Jenkins requested that he be allowed to operate his orphanage for African American children in the site, but the building needed $3000 to $5000 in repairs. In 1895 to 1939, it was the home of the Jenkins Orphanage for young African American children. It was remodeled in 1939 for offices of the Housing Authority of Charleston.

It was declared a National Historic Landmark in 1973. The building was named one of the African American Historic Places in South Carolina.

== See also ==
- List of National Historic Landmarks in South Carolina
- National Register of Historic Places listings in Charleston, South Carolina
