= Kiawah Homes =

Housing complex in Charleston, South Carolina

Kiawah Homes is a housing complex located in the Wagener Terrace neighborhood in Charleston, South Carolina. It was built in 1942 as part of a federal housing program for World War II laborers and sold to the Charleston Housing Authority in 1954.

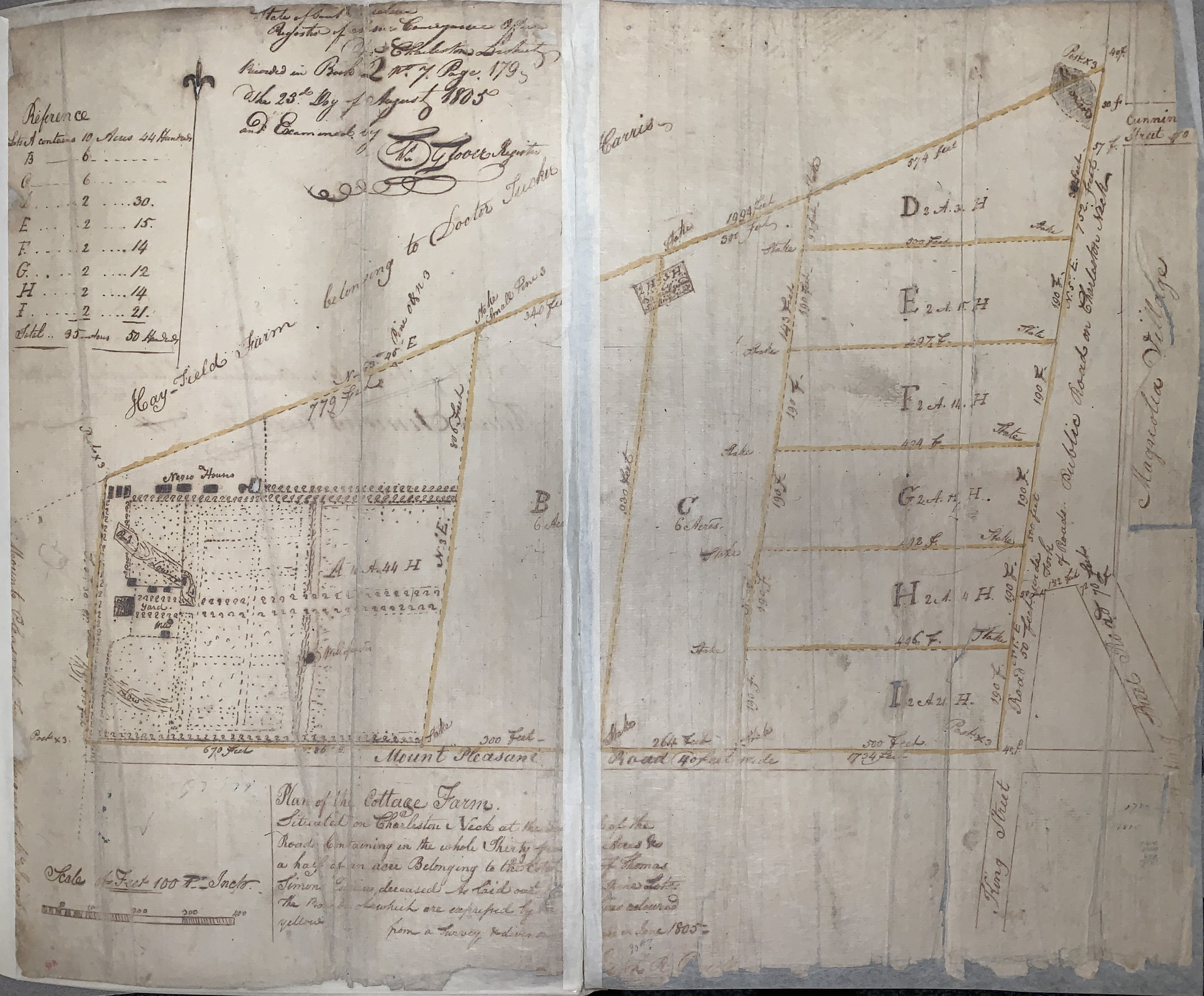
Long before the Kiawah Homes were built, the property had been The Cottage Farm at least by 1805.

== Federal housing ==
Construction on the 60-unit project by contractor Skinner & Ruddock began in 1942 at a cost of $196,864. Built during World War II, the project was initially set aside for workers at the Charleston Shipbuilding and Drydock Co. The housing was one of several wartime projects meant to add over 1000 housing units to the upper peninsula. The units were occupied by December 31, 1942.

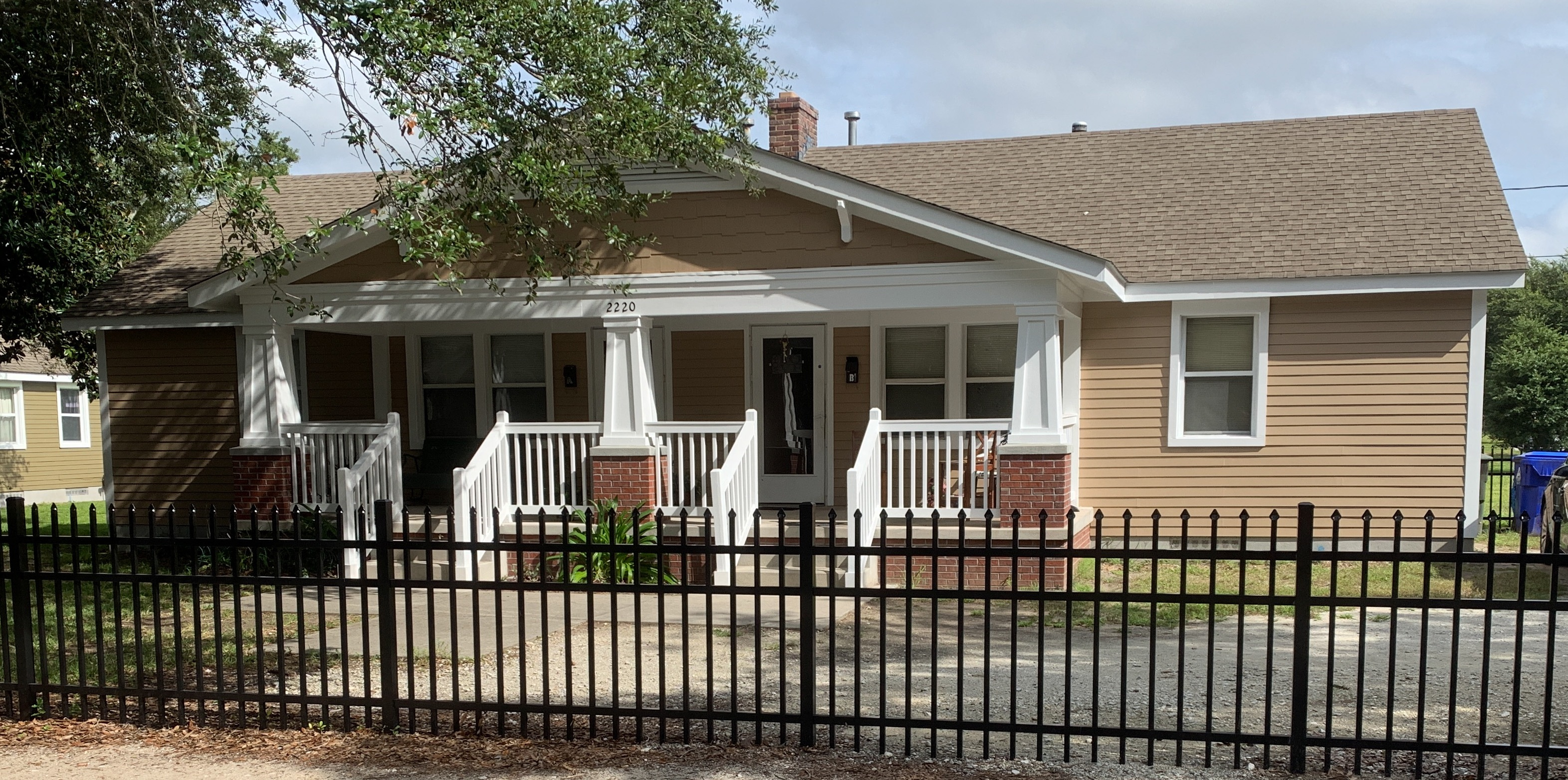
2220 Mt. Pleasant St. is one of the typical units in the Kiawah Homes development.

== Sale to Charleston Housing Authority ==
At first, the operation of the Kiawah Homes was performed by the Charleston Housing Authority, but that arrangement ended in November 1947. The federal Public Housing Authority continued to own housing wartime housing projects in Charleston before getting out of the final projects in 1955 and selling the projects to the Charleston Housing Authority. The federal government approved the sale of the Kiawah Homes to the Charleston Housing Authority in 1950. After a delay caused by the Korean War, the transfer to the Charleston Housing Authority was finalized in December 1953 with ownership to change on January 1, 1954. The Housing Authority agreed to pay for the units by assigning the rental income back.

In 2007, the plain, asbestos-shingles houses were renovated using Arts and Crafts details. In December 2024, the Housing Authority of the City of Charleston (CHA) closed on the financing and has since begun construction on a transformative project via the HUD RAD/Section 18 Conversion, that will revitalize Kiawah Homes into modern, affordable housing.
