= Robert Mills Manor =

Historic house in South Carolina, United States

- U.S. National Register of Historic Places
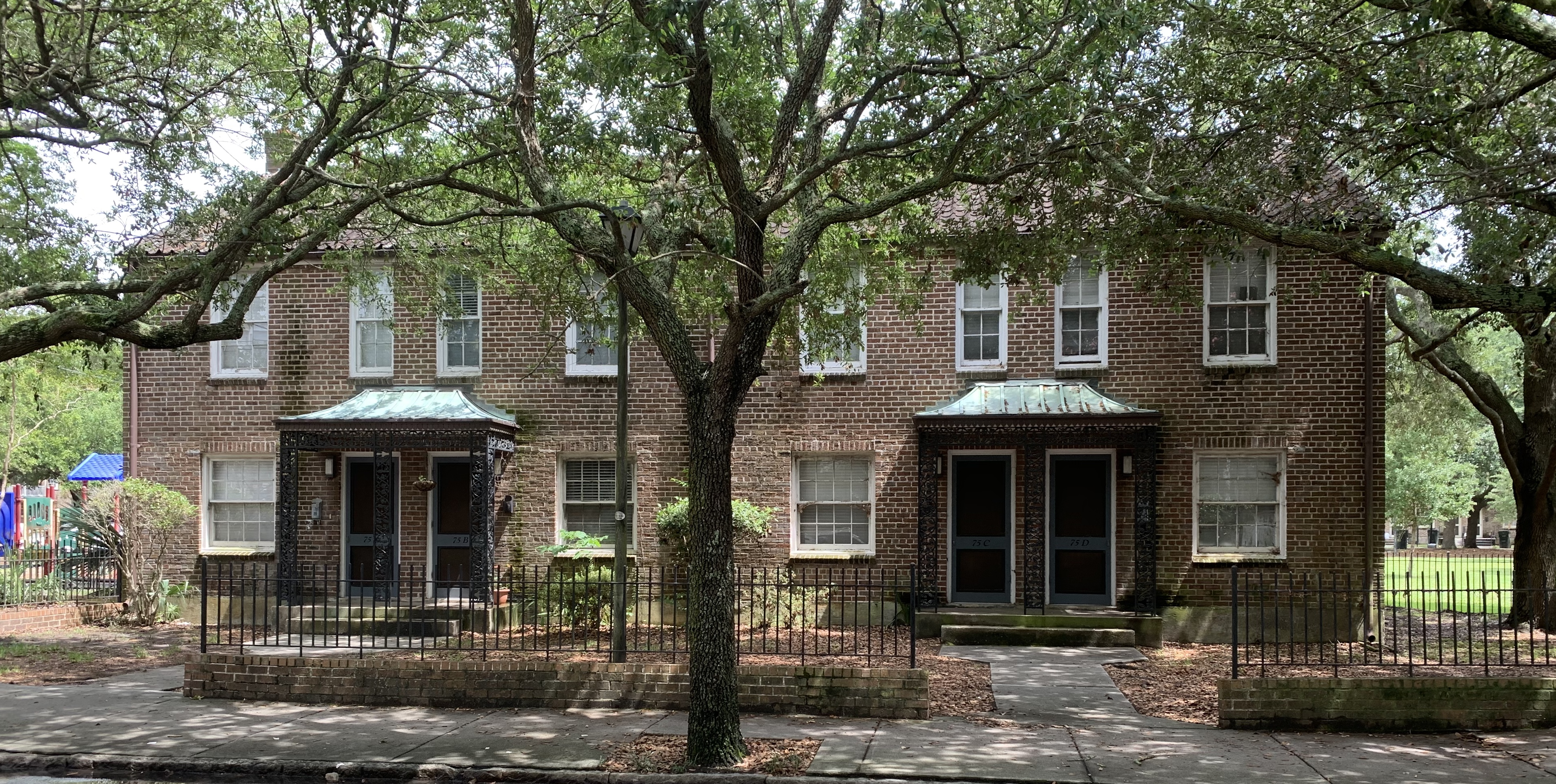
- The housing units at 75 Beaufain St. were built partly of brick salvaged from demolished buildings on the site.

- Location within South Carolina Location within the United States
- Location: Bounded by Queen, Smith, and Logan Sts.; including Cromwell Alley, Wilson St., and portions of Franklin St., Charleston, South Carolina
- Coordinates: 32°46′40″N 79°56′15″W
- Built: 1939
- NRHP reference No.: 100006991
- Added to NRHP: September 2021

The Robert Mills Manor is housing complex located in Harleston Village in Charleston, South Carolina that is included on the National Register.

== History ==
Plans for a new housing complex began in May 1935 when the Public Works Administration decided to allocate $1.5 million to Charleston to clear slums and redevelop the land with new housing. The affordable rent was to pay off the cost of the project over 40 years.

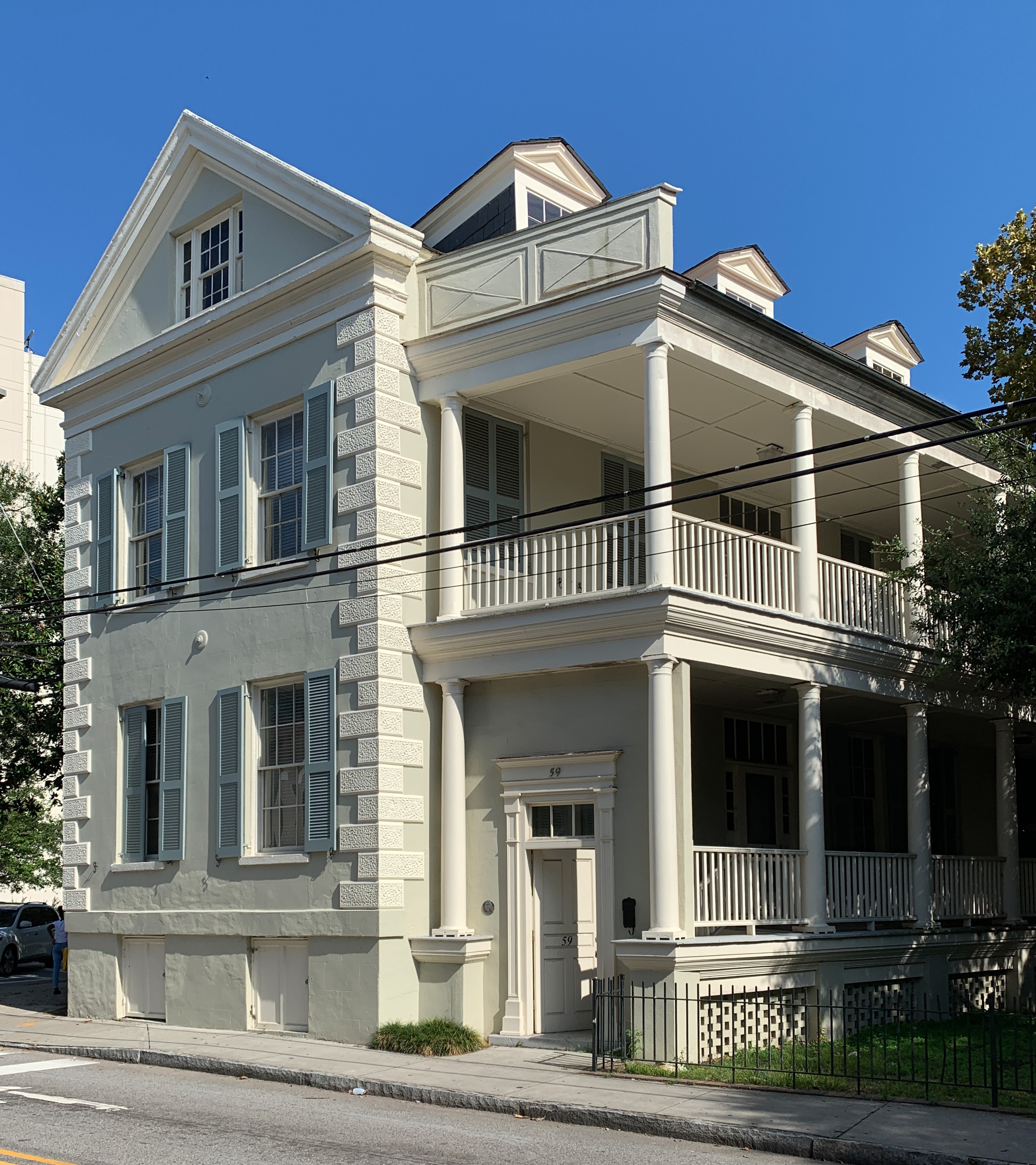
59 Beaufain St.

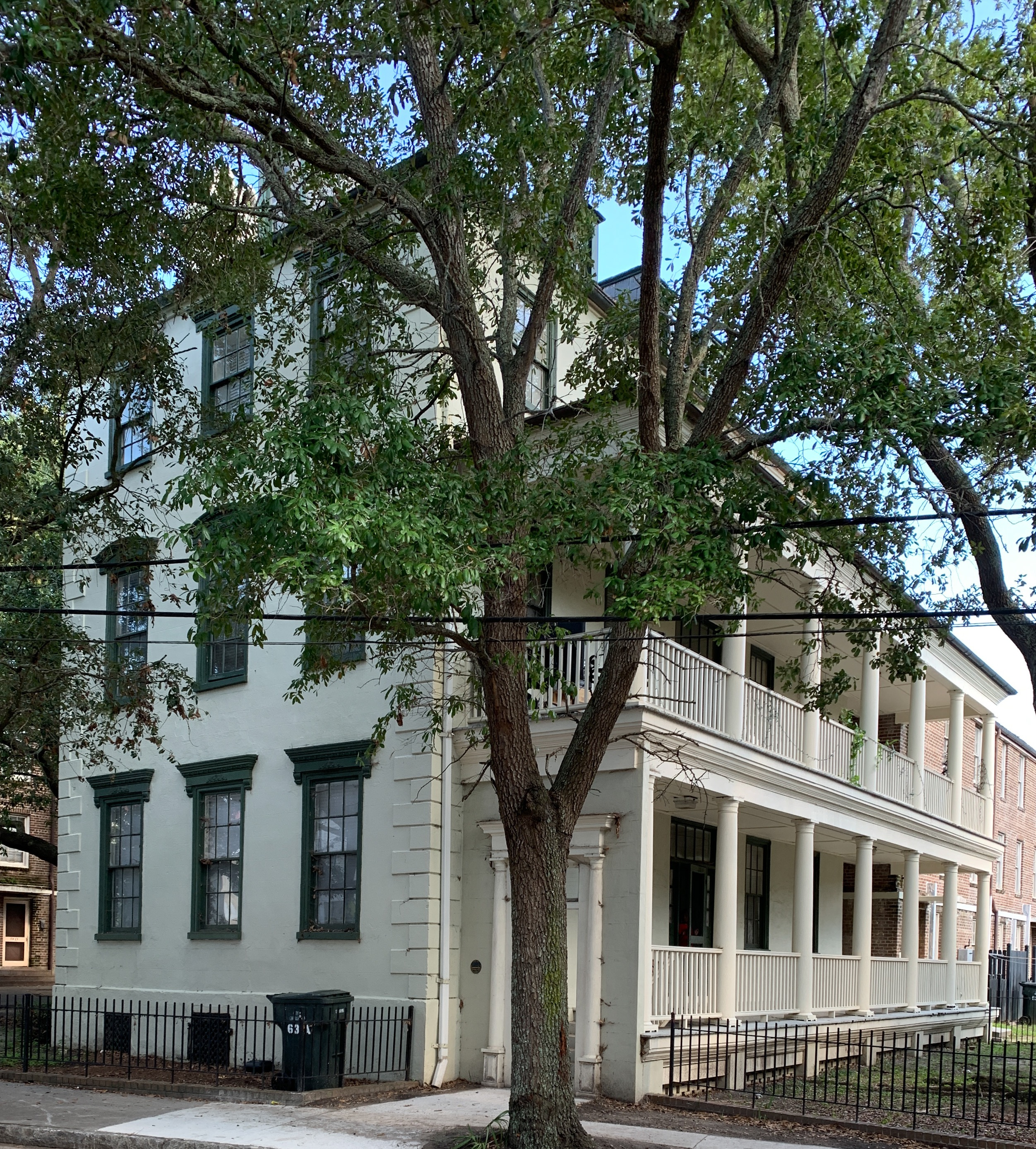
63 Beaufain St.

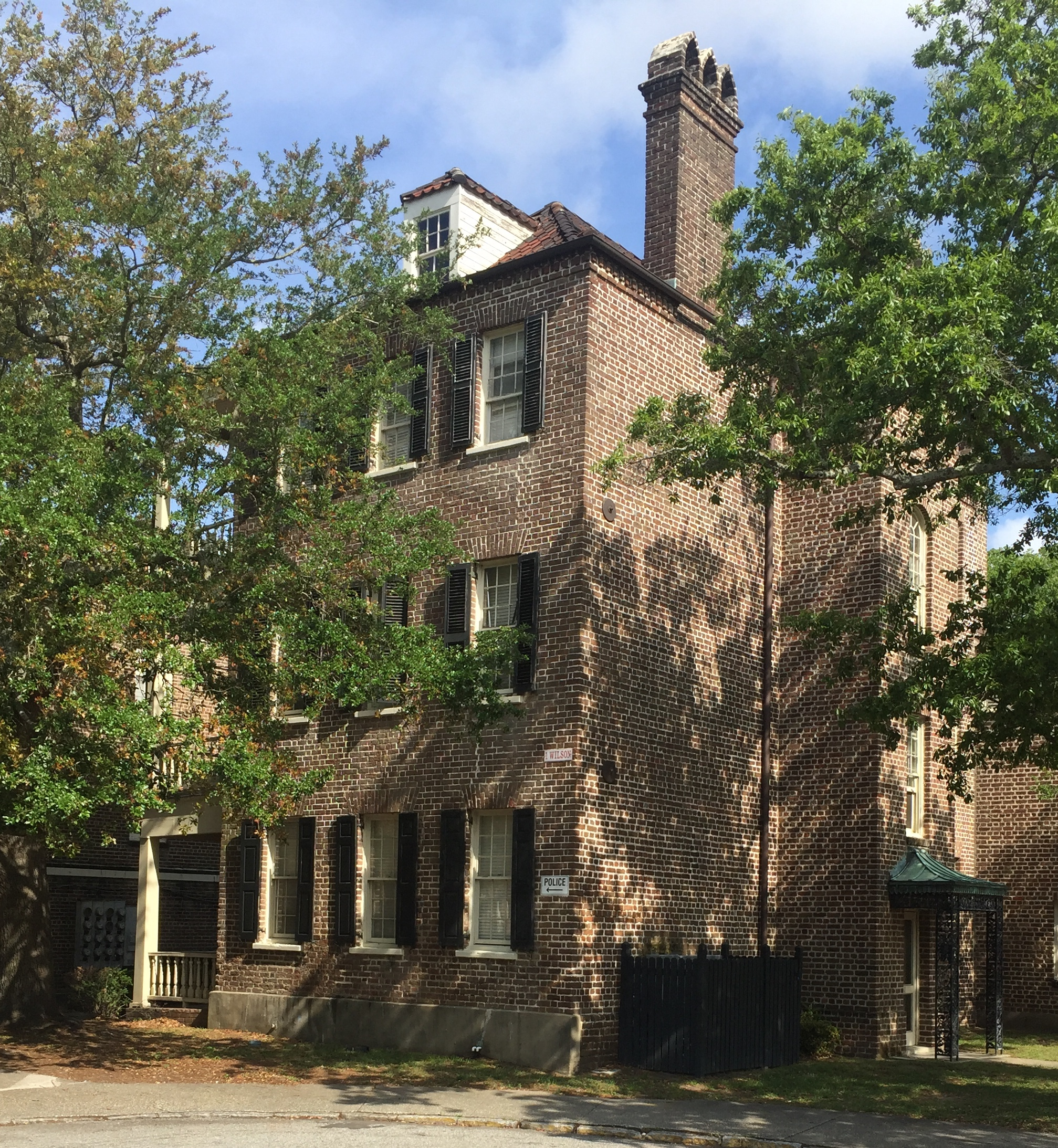
1 Wilson St.

Three houses were retained for architectural merit.

The area included in the project was densely filled with dilapidated wooden houses with a few brick houses but also several large public buildings. At first, the city's new Charleston Housing Authority planned to demolish the old Medical College, the Old Charleston Jail, and the Jenkins Orphanage (which operated out of the old Marine Hospital). In January 1938, a third set of plans were submitted by city officials which would have demolished the Old Charleston Jail (except for the wall around the yard), would have used the ruins of the old Medical College (at the northeast corner of Franklin and Queen Sts.) as a recreation building, and would have converted the old Marine Hospital into apartments.

At a meeting on September 15, 1938, the project was named in honor of Robert Mills, the South Carolina architect for several notable public buildings including the Marine Hospital and part of the Old City Jail.

Bids for the demolition of about seventy houses were opened in October 1938. The new buildings were designed by Housing Architects Associated. The only houses that were spared for architectural merit were 59 and 63 Beaufain St. and 1 Franklin St. (also known as 34 Magazine St.).

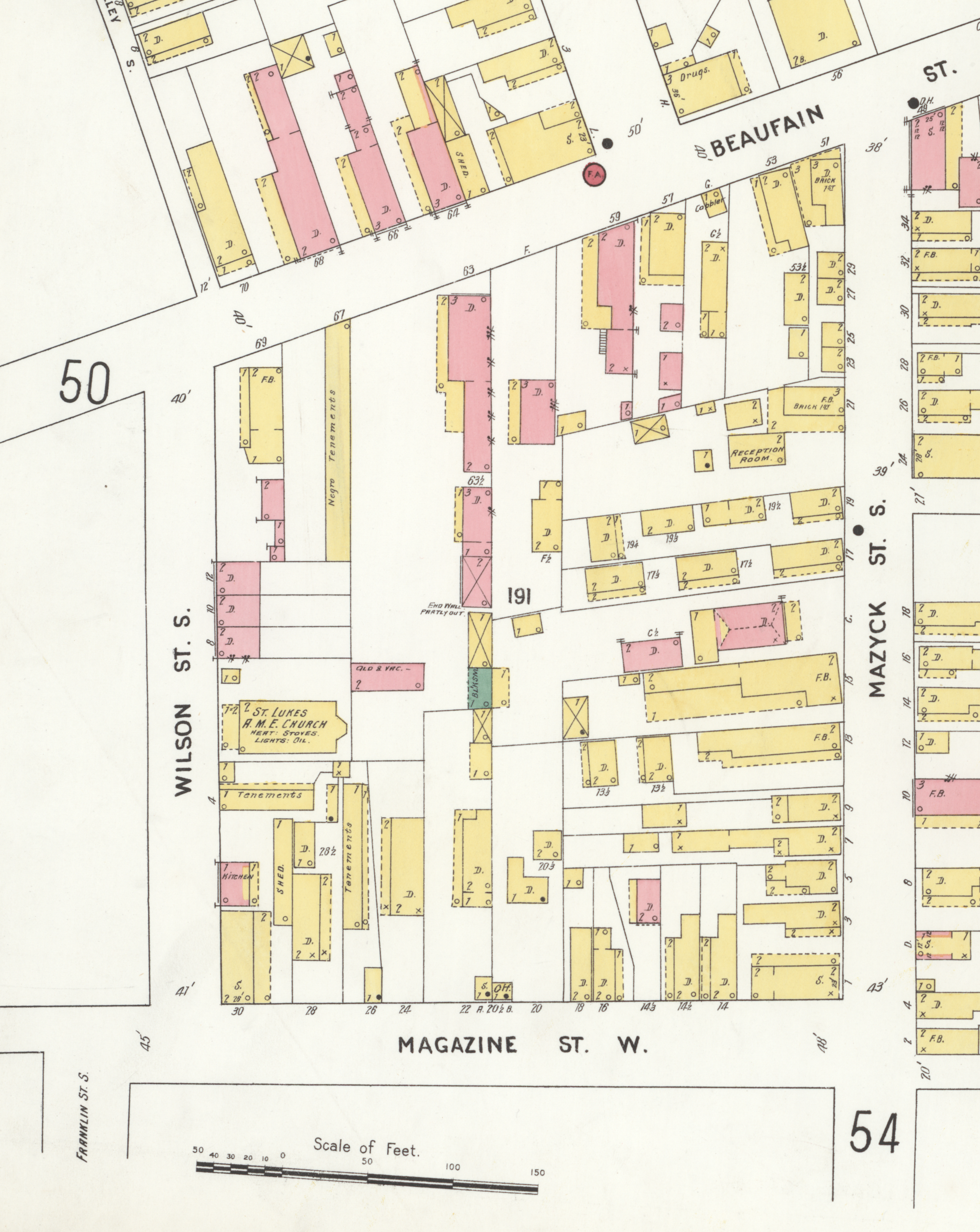
In 1902, one of the three blocks making up the future Robert Mills Manor was shown on the Sanborn Insurance Co. maps with a dense collection of mainly wooden houses. All but two of the brick houses were razed for the complex in 1938.

Samuel Lapham VI was the principal architect for the project and considered it a good example of Charleston style. On February 8, 1938, a building permit for $432,032 was issued for the new construction. A groundbreaking ceremony was held on February 11, 1939, at which Nathan Straus, administrator of the United States Housing Authority, spoke.

Mr. and Mrs. John M. Dorsey were the first occupants of the new development when they moved into 105-H Logan St. on October 16, 1939.

The project was planned as a Whites-only housing complex. In 1964, the National Urban League appealed to President Lyndon Johnson to desegregate Charleston's public housing on the basis of the Civil Rights Act of 1964.

== Architecture ==
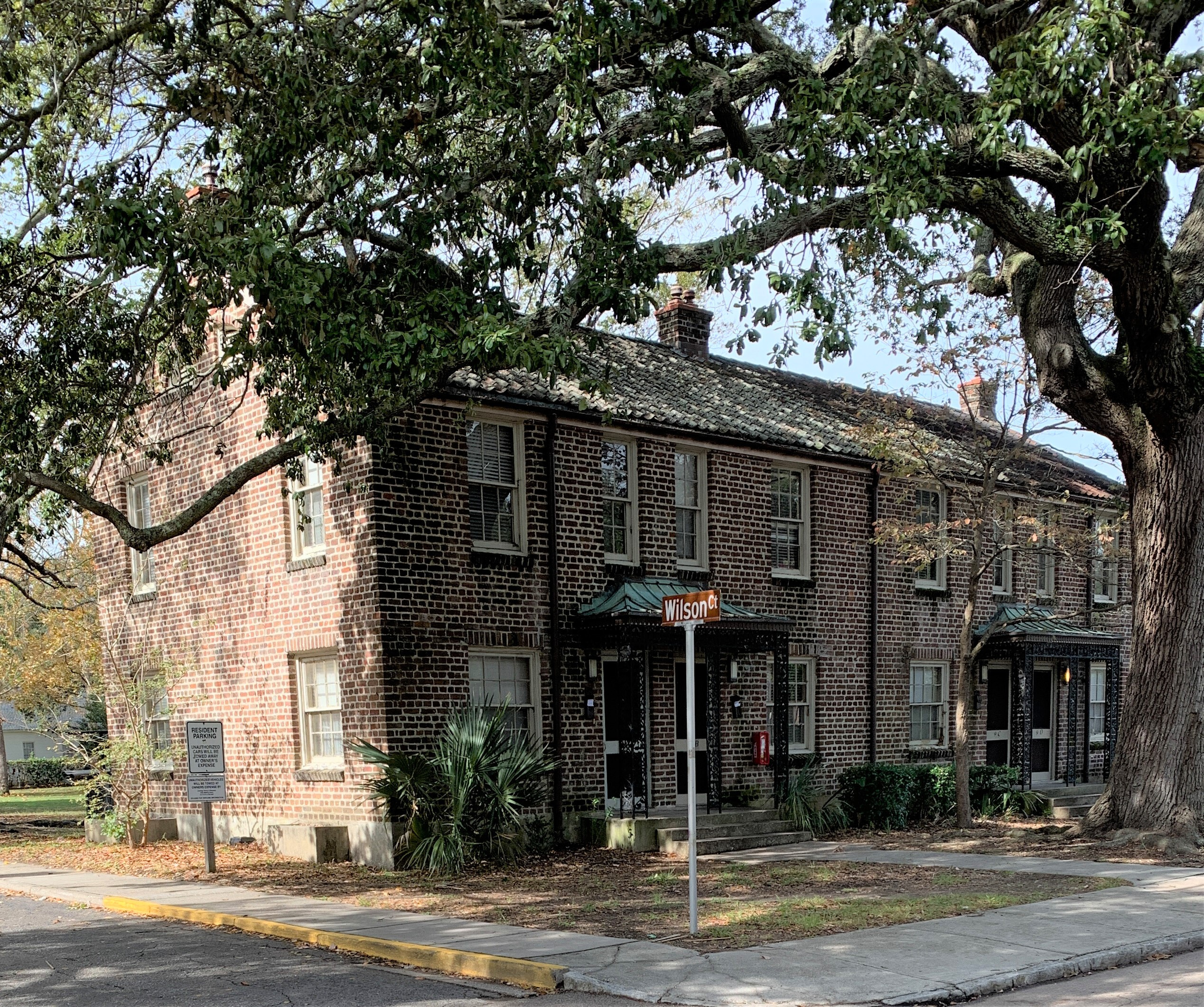
The unit at 9 Wilson St. was built of bricks salvaged from earlier buildings on the site and had decorative ironwork on the stoop.

The original plans called for six two-story buildings with six apartments each and six eight-apartment buildings on the north side of Cromwell Alley. The project was extended between Pitt and Logan Sts. on the south side of Beaufain St. Four more eight-apartment buildings were to be built along Magazine St. between Wilson and Logan Sts. All of the buildings were to be of unpainted brick, using brick salvaged from the demolitions of existing buildings on the site.

The Preservation Society of Charleston opposed plans to alter the high brick wall that surrounded the Old Jail. The Charleston Housing Authority rejected the request and decided to substantially lower the height of the wall to allow more light into the yard of the Old Jail.
