= Samuel Lapham VI =

Samuel Lapham VI (September 23, 1892 – 1972) was an American architect.

== Early life ==
Lapham was born on September 23, 1892, in Charleston, South Carolina. He was the son of Samuel Lapham V and Annie Grey Soule (a direct descendant of Pilgrim George Soule). His father was a prominent ice manufacturer and city councilman in Charleston.

He attended the University School of Charleston, which became the Gaud School during his senior year in 1908, followed by the College of Charleston where he graduated in 1913 with a BA before attending the Massachusetts Institute of Technology, where he graduated in 1916 with a Bachelor of Architecture.

== Career ==
After graduating from MIT, Lapham worked for Fay, Spofford & Thorndike in Boston including work with Adams Cram. In 1917, Lapham moved to Akron, Ohio taking a position with Carmichael Construction Company until the outbreak of the U.S. role in World War I. He applied by mail and joined a South Carolina unit. He attended Officer's Training Camp at Fort Oglethorpe, Georgia and Fortress Monroe in Virginia. During the war he served at Fort Moultire in Charleston and the 61st Artillery Brigade, 1st Army, American Expeditionary Forces in France. Upon discharge, he joined C.F. Warner of Cleveland, Ohio before returning to Charleston to partner with Albert Simons in 1920.

He joined the Army Reserve serving in the Coastal Artillery starting in 1923. During World War II he was assigned to the Inspector General Office in Atlanta where he inspected construction of bases from Cuba to Kentucky including the secret work at Oak Ridge, Tennessee.

=== Simons & Lapham ===
The architectural firm of Simons & Lapham was influential in creating the first historic preservation ordinance in Charleston, South Carolina, in 1930. The firm worked on preservation projects in South Carolina and Georgia starting in the 1920s. They were honorary life members of the Society for the Preservation of Historic Dwellings of Charleston (now the Preservation Society of Charleston). They also performed new construction. During the expanse of the work the firm did over 300 projects from 1920 to 1972. The firm changed names over the years: Simons & Lapham; Simons, Lapham, Mitchell & Small; Simons, Mitchell, Small & Donahue; Mitchell, Small, Donahue & Logan; and Mitchell, Small & Donahue. The latter was in business as late as 2007.

== Personal life ==
In July 1926, Lapham was married to Lydia LaRoache Thomas. They were the parents of:

- Anne Soule Lapham (1929–2002)
- Samuel Thomas Lapham (1935–1943)
- Samuel Peyre Lapham

Lapham and his wife are buried in Magnolia Cemetery in Charleston, South Carolina.

=== Community service ===
Lapham was active in community service. He was a founding member of the South Carolina Society of Colonial Wars and designed their official seal. He was also a member of Benevolent and Protective Order of Elks Lodge #242 (a lodge his father re organized), Carolina Yacht Club, The Charleston Club, Landmark Lodge #76 Ancient and Free Masons, Kiwanis Club, Saint Cecilia Society, Delta Lodge of Scottish Rite. He was a charter member of the South Carolina Mayflower Society. He joined the American Institute of Architects in 1923 serving as state president in 1936-1937. He was elected a Fellow in 1937 and Member Emeritus in 1955.
