= Albert Simons =

American architect

- Born: 1890; Charleston, South Carolina
- Died: 1980 (aged 89–90); Charleston, South Carolina
- Occupation: Architect
- Spouse: Harriet P. Stoney
- Parent(s): Thomas Grange Simons and Serena Daniel Aiken

Albert Simons (1890 – 1980), had a sixty-year career as an architect and preservationist in Charleston, South Carolina, where he is known for his preservation work and architectural design. He played a key role in the Charleston Renaissance. Simons helped to create many nationally prominent preservation functions such as the zoning ordinance for the historic district, the first such ordinance in America, with municipal austerity, and the first Board of Architectural Review. As a professor at the College of Charleston for over 20 years, he started the School of the Arts whose building is named after him and is honored yearly through the Simons Medal of Excellence.

== Early life and family ==
Born in 1890, Albert Simons descended from a long line of influential Charlestonians. His father, Dr. Thomas Grange Simons, was a physician and who encouraged public health through the advocacy of proper sewers and infrastructure. Simons' uncle, William Martin Aiken, was an architect who designed many large classical buildings such as "The Old Post Office Pavilion" in Washington, D.C., and in his capacity as architect to the United States Treasury, the Federal Mint in Philadelphia.

Albert Simons enrolled at the College of Charleston for his first year and completed his B.S. and M.S. degrees in architecture at the University of Pennsylvania. After graduation he traveled through Europe and Northern Africa studying architecture, and finished his trip studying at the Atelier Hébrard in Paris. During his travels, Simons created hundreds of wonderful travel sketches and watercolors, fulfilling the Beaux-Arts-instilled desire to learn through sketching great examples of architecture. Upon returning to Charleston in 1915, he became one of the first instructors of architecture at the Clemson School of Architecture. During this time, Simons worked briefly as a partner in the firm of Todd, Simons and Todd, until he volunteered to serve in the U.S. Army during World War I. Simons also volunteered to serve in France in World War II.

== Simons & Lapham ==
In 1920, Simons joined forces with Samuel Lapham VI to create the firm “Simons & Lapham.” Their practice focused primarily on traditional homes, however, they also did industrial, religious, educational, public, transportation projects and building restoration. Through the Great Depression, the firm remained successful. Their main commissions came through the federally funded Works Progress Administration work, such as the College of Charleston gymnasium or large plantation projects funded by wealthy northerners.

Throughout the years though, Simons received local and national acclaim for work in the areas of architectural design, preservation, and city planning. Samuel & Lapham worked actively with the City of Charleston government to protect and restore historic homes and was extensively involved with the Historic American Buildings Survey. Some of the firm's most famous work included assistance with restoration of the famous “Rainbow Row”, the renovation of the Planter’s Hotel on Church St., into the Dock Street Theatre, and the design of the new Memminger Auditorium. In addition to their practice, both partners co-edited books of detailed historical research on the architecture of Charleston including, The Octagon Library of Early American Architecture, Vol 1: Charleston, SC (1927) and Plantations of the Carolina Low Country (1939).

== Other Achievements ==
In Simons' years of work in Charleston, he helped create the first historic district in America, the first Board of Architectural Review (BAR), and worked actively as a Fellows of the American Institute of Architects (AIA). He was a founding member and played a key role in the Society for Preservation of Old Dwellings, known today as the Preservation Society of Charleston, and as a leading member on the team that produced This is Charleston: A Survey of the Architectural Heritage of a Unique American City, a building-by-building study of the historic Charleston peninsula. Simons would also serve on the boards of many of Charleston’s civic and cultural institutions, including the boards of the College of Charleston, the Charleston Museum, the Charleston Library Society, St. Michael's Episcopal Church, and the Poetry Society of Charleston.

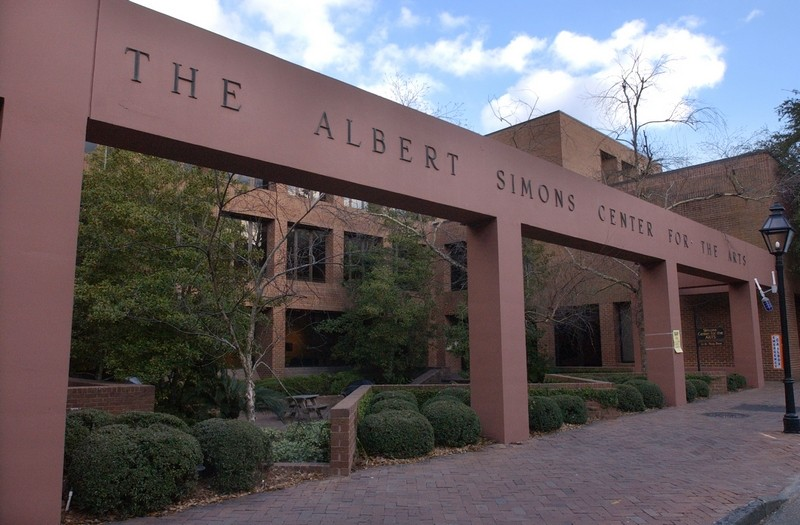
The Albert Simons Center for the Arts at the College of Charleston

Albert Simons also worked closely with the City to decide the placement and design of the public housing projects in Charleston. These low rise (none over two stories) brick apartments were connected in the town house style with generous open space in both the front and the back. They were dispersed throughout several neighborhoods on the Charleston peninsula in a way that integrated them into the fabric of the city.

Simons also accumulated a collection of architectural salvage that he donated to the Charleston Museum to present it from feeding the market for salvage and incentivizing owners to gut their historic properties. The museum sold the collection at auction around 2009.

== Simons Medal of Excellence ==
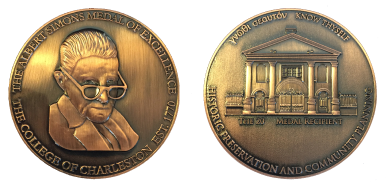
The Albert Simons Medal of Excellence. Albert Simons is depicted on the Obverse and The College of Charleston's motto and iconic Porter's Lodge are on the Reverse.

Albert Simons began teaching at the College of Charleston in 1924, and created the first Art History course at the College later that year. He continued to teach at the college until 1948. He helped this single course evolve into the School of the Arts. The College named the Albert Simons Center for the Arts for him at the cornerstone-laying ceremony in 1977. After the 20th anniversary of the College of Charleston’s School of the Arts, the Simons Medal of Excellence was established to honor individuals who have excelled in one or more of the areas in which Albert Simons excelled, including civic design, architectural design, historic preservation and urban planning. Past recipients have included: The Hon. Mayor Joseph P. Riley Jr. (2010), John D. Milner, FAIA (2011), Andres Duany, FAIA, and Elizabeth Plater-Zyberk (2012), Allan Greenberg and Charles, Prince of Wales (2013), Richard Jenrette and Thomas Gordon Smith (2014), Antoinette J. Lee (2015), Robert A. M. Stern (2016), Peter Pennoyer (2017), and Martha A. Zierden (2018). Awardees are announced during January for the spring ceremony.
