= Jenkins Orphanage =

Institute in Charleston, South Carolina

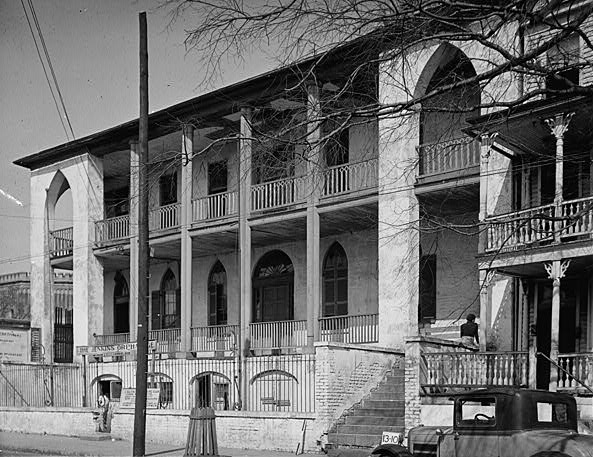
Jenkin's Orphanage occupied the Old Marine Hospital during 1893–1937

The Jenkins Orphanage, now officially known as the Jenkins Institute For Children, was established in 1891 by Rev. Daniel Joseph Jenkins in Charleston, South Carolina. Jenkins was a businessman and Baptist minister who encountered street children and decided to organize an orphanage for young African Americans.

The original site of the orphanage was 660 King Street, but the number of orphans quickly outpaced the facilities. In 1893, the orphanage moved to the Old Marine Hospital at 20 Franklin Street. This National Historic Landmark, designed by Robert Mills, served as home of the orphanage until 1937. Its present-day location is in North Charleston, South Carolina.

== Jenkins Orphanage Bands ==
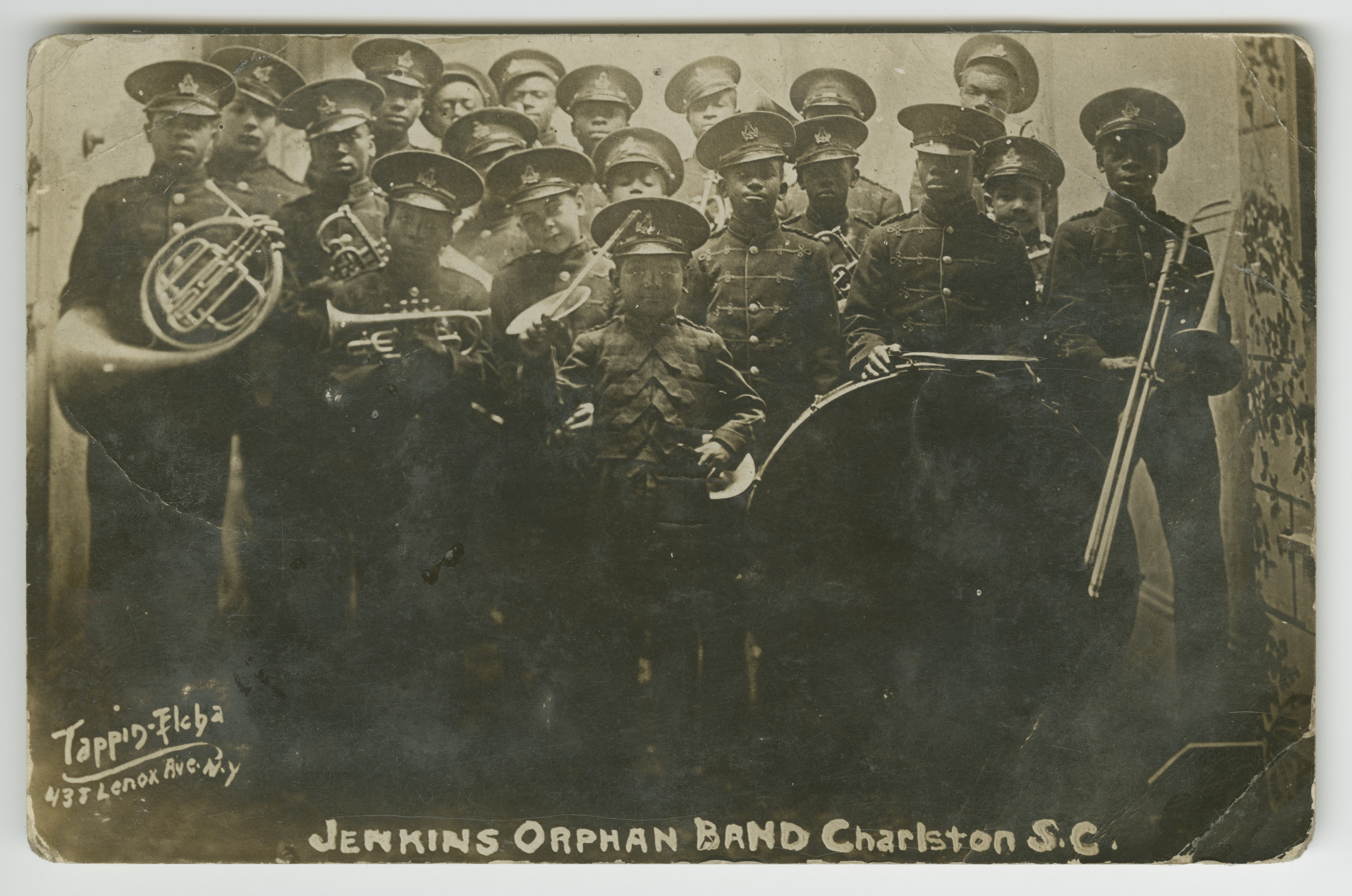
A black and white photograph postcard of the Jenkins Orphanage Band of Charleston, South Carolina.

The orphanage took in donations of musical instruments and Jenkins hired two local Charleston musicians — P.M. "Hatsie" Logan and Francis Eugene Mikell — to tutor the children in music. Upon its establishment, it became the only black instrumental group organized in South Carolina. The band's debut was on the streets of Charleston with the permission of the mayor, police chief, and Chamber of Commerce. The Jenkins Orphanage Band, wearing discarded Citadel uniforms, performed throughout the United States and even toured England raising money for the support of the orphanage. It played in inaugural parades of Presidents Theodore Roosevelt and William Taft. It appeared at the St. Louis Exposition and the Anglo-American Exposition in 1914. It toured the United States from coast to coast, and played in Paris, Berlin, Rome, London, and Vienna. As many as five bands were on tour during the 1920s. The band ceased to exist in the 1980s.

The orphanage published the Charleston Messenger newspaper.

In 2003, a 10-minute Fox Movietone News newsreel feature about the band, filmed on November 22, 1928, was selected for preservation in the National Film Registry by the Library of Congress, being deemed "culturally, historically, or aesthetically significant".

William "Cat" Anderson, Jabbo Smith, Tom Delaney, and Freddie Green are notable alumni.

== Bibliography ==
- John Chilton (1980) A Jazz Nursery: The Story of the Jenkins' Orphanage Bands of Charleston, South Carolina, 60 p., London, U.K.: Bloomsbury, ISBN 095012902X.
