= Loutrel Briggs =

American landscape architect

Loutrel Winslow Briggs (December 12, 1893 - May 1977) was an American landscape architect active in Charleston, South Carolina.

Briggs was born in New York City, graduated from Cornell University in 1917 with a degree in "Rural Art" (landscape architecture), and chaired the department of landscape architecture at the New York School of Fine and Applied Art. In the 1920s he began a seasonal landscape architecture practice in Charleston catering to wealthy New Yorkers who wintered in the area. His first major commission was in 1929 for Mrs. Washington Roebling, widow of the engineer who supervised construction of the Brooklyn Bridge. In 1951, Briggs published a book, "Charleston Gardens," about the private gardens in Charleston, South Carolina.

Briggs is now best known for more than one hundred gardens that he designed in or near Charleston's historic district. He was also landscape architect for Mepkin Abbey.
