= U.S. Route 1 in South Carolina =

Section of U.S. Highway in South Carolina, United States

U.S. Highway 1
- US 1 highlighted in red

Route information
- Maintained by SCDOT
- Length: 170.540 mi (274.458 km)
- Existed: 1926–present
- Tourist routes: SC Heritage Corridor: Discovery Route

Major junctions
- South end: US 1 / US 25 / US 78 / US 278 / SR 10 / SR 121 at the Georgia state line in North Augusta
- I-520 in North Augusta; I-20 near Aiken; US 178 / SC 391 in Batesburg-Leesville; I-20 in Lexington; I-26 in West Columbia; US 21 / US 176 / US 321 in Columbia; I-20 / I-77 near Columbia; US 601 in Lugoff; US 521 in Camden; US 52 near Cheraw
- North end: US 1 at the North Carolina state line near Wallace

Location
- Country: United States
- State: South Carolina
- Counties: Aiken, Saluda, Lexington, Richland, Kershaw, Chesterfield, Marlboro

Highway system
- United States Numbered Highway System; List; Special; Divided; South Carolina State Highway System; Interstate; US; State; Scenic
← SC 917	→ SC 2

U.S. Highway 1 (US 1) is a 170.540-mile (274.458 km) north–south U.S. Highway that crosses South Carolina from southwest to northeast and connects the cities of North Augusta, Aiken, Lexington, Columbia, Camden, and Cheraw.

The route parallels Interstate 20 (I-20) closely from the Georgia border to Camden, where I-20 turns to a more directly easterly direction. From Camden to the North Carolina border, US 1 is the highest capacity route through much of the Sandhills region.

== Route description ==
US 1 enters South Carolina in North Augusta, along an expressway with US 25, US 78, and US 278 on a bridge over the Savannah River from Augusta, Georgia. South Carolina Highway 121 (SC 121) also begins at the state border. The expressway is known locally as the Jefferson Davis Highway. At the second interchange (E. Martintown Road), US 25 and SC 121 leave the expressway. After several at-grade intersections, there is an interchange with I-520, and the route bypasses the Aiken County communities of Clearwater (where US 278 leaves the concurrency), Burnettown, and Gloverville. Upon entering the city of Aiken, the three concurrent routes transition to a boulevard with a center turn and turns from a northeasterly direction to a more directly eastbound direction. This area is heavily developed, with shopping centers and subdivision entrances along both sides of the road. The road is known locally as Augusta–Aiken Road. Reaching the historic central area of Aiken, the route turns to a divided road again as the name changes to Richland Avenue, and the route becomes heavily residential with a wide, tree-lined median down the middle. US 1 leaves Richland Avenue and US 78 to turn north on York Street.

York Street is a four-lane boulevard until it meets Hampton Avenue, where it leaves the main grid of central Aiken and becomes a five-lane boulevard with a center turn lane through a light industrial area leading north out of the city. Leaving Aiken, it is known as the Columbia Highway and passes Aiken Regional Airport and an interchange with I-20 north of the city, after which the road narrows to a two-lane rural highway. It passes into Saluda County in Moneta, and then on through the town of Batesburg-Leesville as Columbia Avenue, where it gains a center turn lane. It meets the eastern terminus of SC 23 at the eastern edge of town and loses its center turn lane as the name changes to Augusta Highway. Passing through a large rural area, the road once again widens to a five-lane boulevard with a center turning lane as it approaches Lexington.

Entering Lexington, the road merges with US 378 along West Main Street. US 378 then leaves West Main Street along Columbia Avenue. West Main Street changes to East Main Street at Lake Drive (SC 6 and changes names again to Augusta Road about 0.5 miles (0.80 km) before a second interchange with I-20. US 1 passes east–west through the communities of Oak Grove and West Columbia before crossing the Congaree River along the Gervais Street Bridge. Shortly before the bridge US 378 merges once again with US 1.

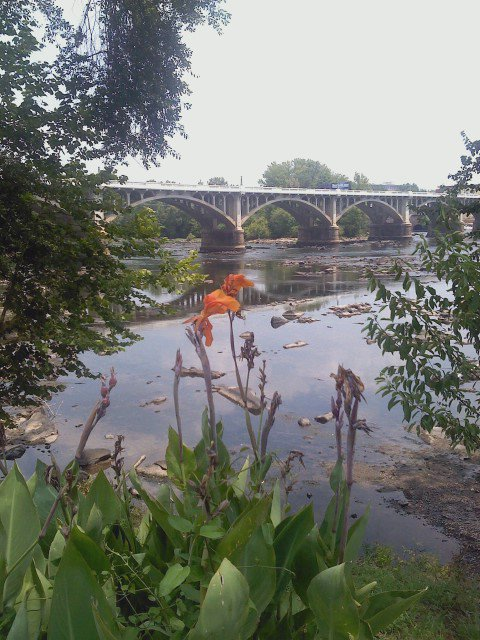
Gervais Street Bridge over the Congaree River

After the river, US 1 goes through downtown Columbia along Gervais Street, passing directly in front of the South Carolina State House. At Millwood Avenue, US 1 turns northeast while US 378 leaves to the southeast on the same road. Crossing SC 12 (Taylor Street/Forest Drive), the name changes to Two Notch Road, named for when the road was marked by posts with two notches carved. Passing the Columbia Place shopping mall, it has a third interchange with I-20 and passes through several unincorporated Columbia suburbs in Richland County. An interchange with Clemson Road provides access to I-20 and to Fort Jackson.

Entering Kershaw County, US 1 merges with US 601 in Lugoff and, crossing the Wateree River, enters Camden along DeKalb Street. US 601 leaves at the center of Camden. From Camden, it continues northeast as a two-lane road through several small towns of the Sandhills region, merging with US 52 between Cheraw State Park and the town of south of Cheraw. Within Cheraw, it follows Market Street (where SC 9 joins) then Second Street and turns onto Powe Street (while US 52 continues on Second Street). US 1 turns north on its own routing while SC 9 continues west. Approximately five miles (8.0 km) north of Cheraw, US 1 enters North Carolina.

The entire route is part of the Jefferson Davis Highway, named after Civil War Confederate leader Jefferson Davis; with exception between North Augusta and Aiken, where US 1 was realigned, leaving SC 421 its section of the highway name. Markers of the highway dot all along the route, though most sections do have other road names too.

== History ==
US 1 was established in 1927 as an original U.S. Highway. It traveled generally as it does now, overlapping with SC 12, from North Augusta to West Columbia, SC 2, from West Columbia to Columbia, and SC 50, from Columbia to the North Carolina state line. The following year, both SC 12 and SC 50 were dropped along the route. The entire route was paved by 1932.

Around 1938, US 1 was rerouted between Cheraw and Wallace, going further north along its now current alignment and leaving behind Hickson Road (S-35-52) and Brickyard Road (S-35-36). The first section widen to four-lane was a two-mile (3.2 km) section north of Columbia, in 1940. Between 1940 and 1946, US 1 was rerouted in Columbia; originally using Gervais Street, Assembly Street, Taylor Street, and Two Notch Road, switching to Gervais Street, Harden Street, Taylor Street, and Two Notch Road. By 1952, US 1 was rerouted again in Columbia, switching to Gervais Street, Millwood Avenue, and Two Notch. Also by 1952, US 1/US 78 were given new alignment bypassing Clearwater, Bath, Langley, and Gloverville; the old alignment became SC 421. By 1957, US 1/US 78 was rerouted from the Fifth Street Bridge to its current alignment over the Savannah River.

== Major intersections ==
County	Location	mi	km	Destinations	Notes
Savannah River		0.000	0.000	US 1 south / US 25 south / SR 121 south / US 78 west / US 278 west / SR 10 west (Gordon Highway) – Augusta	Continuation into Georgia
Savannah River		0.000– 0.005	0.000– 0.0080	South Carolina–Georgia state line	
Aiken	North Augusta	0.188– 0.340	0.303– 0.547	5th Street Bridge / River North Drive	Interchange
Aiken	North Augusta	0.640– 0.710	1.030– 1.143	US 25 / SC 121 north – North Augusta, Edgefield	East end of freeway section; eastern end of US 25 and SC 121 concurrencies
Aiken	North Augusta	0.870	1.400	Buena Vista Avenue (SC 125 Conn. west) to I-20 / SC 230	Right-in/right-out interchange; westbound exit and entrance; eastern terminus of SC 125 Conn.
Aiken	North Augusta	1.560– 1.950	2.511– 3.138	I-520 (Palmetto Parkway) – Augusta, Columbia, Atlanta	I-520 exit 17
Aiken	Clearwater	2.150– 2.380	3.460– 3.830	US 278 east / SC 125 (Atomic Road) – Beech Island, Savannah River Site SC 421 north (Augusta Road) – Clearwater	Interchange; eastern end of US 278 concurrency; southern terminus of SC 421
Aiken	Burnettown	4.040	6.502	SC 126 (Belvedere-Clearwater Road) – Belvedere	
Aiken	Graniteville	10.324– 10.330	16.615– 16.625	SC 191 (Main Street) – Graniteville, Vaucluse, Warrenville	
Aiken	Aiken	12.300	19.795	US 1 Truck north / US 78 Truck east / SC 19 Truck / SC 118 (Robert M. Bell Parkway south / Hitchcock Parkway north) – USC Aiken Convocation Center	Southern terminus of US 1 Truck; western terminus of US 78 Truck
Aiken	Aiken	12.470	20.069	SC 421 south (Augusta Road)	Northern terminus of SC 421; no left turn allowed from SC 421 NB to US 1 SB/US 78 WB
Aiken	Aiken	15.620	25.138	SC 19 (Laurens Street) – Eureka, Edgefield	
Aiken	Aiken	15.800	25.428	SC 19 Conn. (Chesterfield Street) – Savannah River Site	Signed also as SC 19
Aiken	Aiken	15.890	25.572	US 78 east (Richland Avenue) – Montmorenci, Wagener	Eastern end of US 78 concurrency
Aiken	Aiken	17.360	27.938	US 1 Truck / US 78 Truck / SC 118 (Rudy Mason Parkway) – Williston, USC Aiken, Aiken High School, Aiken Technical College	Provides access to Aiken Regional Medical Center
Aiken		23.940	38.528	I-20 – Columbia, Augusta	I-20 exit 22
Aiken		33.540	53.977	SC 392 (Engineer Road) – Ridge Spring	
Aiken	Monetta	37.290	60.012	SC 39 (Main Street / Old Ninety-Six Indian Trail) – Wagener, Orangeburg, Ridge Spring	
Saluda	No major junctions				
Lexington	Batesburg-Leesville	43.150	69.443	US 178 / SC 391 (Pine Street) – Orangeburg, Saluda	
Lexington	Batesburg-Leesville	45.190	72.726	SC 245 (Lee Street) – Orangeburg, Newberry	
Lexington	Batesburg-Leesville	46.520	74.867	SC 23 west (Leesville Avenue) – Ridge Spring	Eastern terminus of SC 23
Lexington	Lexington	61.020	98.202	US 378 west – Saluda	Southern end of US 378 concurrency
Lexington	Lexington	61.700	99.297	US 378 east (Columbia Avenue) – Columbia	Northern end of US 378 concurrency
Lexington	Lexington	62.250	100.182	SC 6 east (Church Street / US 1 Conn. north)	Southern end of SC 6 concurrency (southbound only; southbound lanes of US 1 Conn., which only travels southbound; eastbound lanes of SC 6; southern terminus of US 1 Conn.
Lexington	Lexington	62.370	100.375	SC 6 west (North Lake Drive)	Northern end of SC 6 concurrency (southbound only); westbound lanes of SC 6
Lexington		64.840– 64.870	104.350– 104.398	I-20 – Augusta, Florence	I-20 exit 58
Lexington	Oak Grove	70.070– 70.100	112.767– 112.815	I-26 – Charleston, Spartanburg	I-26 exit 111
Lexington	West Columbia	70.760	113.877	SC 12 east (Jarvis Klapman Boulevard) – Columbia	Western terminus of SC 12
Lexington	West Columbia	72.100	116.034	SC 35 (12th Street)	
Lexington	West Columbia	72.320	116.388	Charleston Highway south (US 21 Conn. south)	No access from US 1 north to US 21 Conn. or from US 21 Conn. to US 1 south; northern terminus of US 21 Conn. and Charleston Highway
Lexington	West Columbia	72.500	116.677	9th Street (SC 12 Conn. north)	Southern terminus of SC 12 Conn.
Lexington	West Columbia	73.210	117.820	SC 2 (State Street)	
Lexington	West Columbia	73.290	117.949	US 378 west (Sunset Boulevard) – Lexington	Southern end of US 378 concurrency
Richland	Columbia	73.870	118.882	US 21 / US 176 / US 321 (Huger Street)	
Richland	Columbia	74.480	119.864	SC 48 (Assembly Street)	
Richland	Columbia	74.890	120.524	US 76 west (Bull Street)	Southern end of US 76 concurrency
Richland	Columbia	75.870	122.101	US 76 east / US 378 east (Millwood Avenue)	Eastern end of US 76 and US 378 concurrencies
Richland	Columbia	76.270	122.745	SC 12 (Taylor Street / Forest Drive)	
Richland	Columbia	78.100	125.690	SC 16 (Beltline Boulevard)	
Richland	Columbia	78.160	125.786	US 1 Conn. west	Eastern terminus of US 1 Conn.
Richland	Dentsville	82.430	132.658	I-20 – Florence, Augusta	I-20 exit 74
Richland	Dentsville	83.150	133.817	I-77 – Charleston, Charlotte	I-77 exit 17
Kershaw	Lugoff	101.470	163.300	US 601 south – St. Matthews	Southern end of US 601 concurrency
Kershaw	Lugoff	101.740	163.735	SC 34 west (Ridgeway Road) – Ridgeway	Southern end of SC 34 concurrency
Kershaw	Camden	104.240	167.758	US 521 Truck north / US 601 Truck north (Springdale Drive) – Springdale Race Course, Steeplechase Museum, Camden Country Club	Southern end of US 521 Truck concurrency; southern terminus of US 601 Truck
Kershaw	Camden	105.298	169.461	Senator Donald H. Don Holland Memorial Bridge	Crossing over railroad tracks of CSX
Kershaw	Camden	105.470	169.738	US 521 Truck south (Chestnut Ferry Road) – Camden High School, Larry Doby Park	Northern end of US 521 Truck concurrency
Kershaw	Camden	106.510	171.411	US 521 / US 601 north (Broad Street) to I-20 – Sumter, Kershaw	Northern end of US 601 concurrency
Kershaw	Camden	106.970	172.152	US 521 Truck south (Mill Street / US 1 Truck south / SC 34 Truck) – Alpha Center	Northern terminus of US 1 Truck, US 521 Truck, and SC 34 Truck
Kershaw	Camden	107.840	173.552	SC 34 east (Bishopville Highway) – Bishopville	Northern end of SC 34 concurrency
Kershaw	Bethune	126.680	203.872	SC 341 (Main Street) – Bishopville, Kershaw	
Chesterfield	McBee	133.720	215.201	SC 151 (Pine Avenue) – Hartsville, Jefferson	
Chesterfield		135.570	218.179	SC 145 north – Chesterfield	To Carolina Sandhills National Wildlife Refuge
Chesterfield	Patrick	148.540	239.052	SC 102 (Poison Street / Turnage Street) – Hartsville, Chesterfield	
Chesterfield		158.450	255.001	US 52 south – Society Hill, Darlington	Southern end of US 52 concurrency; to Cheraw State Park
Chesterfield		159.360	256.465	US 1 Truck north / US 52 Truck north (Cash Road) to SC 9 / SC 9 Truck	Southern terminius of US 1 Truck and US 52 Truck
Chesterfield	Cheraw	160.790	258.766	SC 9 north (Market Street) – Chesterfield	Southern end of SC 9 concurrency
Chesterfield	Cheraw	162.050	260.794	US 52 north (2nd Street) – Morven, Wadesboro	Northern end of US 52 concurrency
Chesterfield	Cheraw	162.150	260.955	US 1 Truck south / US 52 Truck / SC 9 Truck north (Front Street) – Old St. David's Church	Northern terminus of US 1 Truck; southern terminus of SC 9 Truck
Marlboro	Wallace	163.930	263.820	SC 9 south to SC 177 – Bennettsville, Hamlet	Northern end of SC 9 concurrency
Marlboro		170.540	274.458	US 1 north – Rockingham	Continuation into North Carolina
1.000 mi = 1.609 km; 1.000 km = 0.621 mi: Concurrency terminus

== See also ==
- Special routes of U.S. Route 1

U.S. Route 1
Previous state: Georgia	South Carolina	Next state: North Carolina
