= South Carolina Highway 421 =

State highway in South Carolina, United States

South Carolina Highway 421
- Augusta Road

Route information
- Maintained by SCDOT
- Length: 10.360 mi (16.673 km)
- Existed: 1952–present

Major junctions
- South end: US 1 / US 78 / US 278 / SC 125 southwest of Clearwater
- North end: US 1 / US 78 in Aiken

Location
- Country: United States
- State: South Carolina
- Counties: Aiken

Highway system
- South Carolina State Highway System; Interstate; US; State; Scenic
| ← SC 420 | → SC 430 |

South Carolina Highway 421 (SC 421) is a 10.360-mile (16.673 km) state highway in the U.S. state of South Carolina. It is an alternate route to U.S. Route 1 (US 1) and US 78 between North Augusta and Aiken.

== Route description ==
SC 421 begins where it splits off from US 1/US 78 (Jefferson Davis Highway) southwest of Clearwater; it immediately connects with US 278/SC 125 (Atomic Road). Heading northeast, it parallels US 1/US 78 to its south, going through the towns of Clearwater, Burnettown, Langley, Gloverville and Warrenville. Upon entering Aiken, it reconnects with US 1/US 78. A majority of the highway is four-lanes that travels a total of 10.4 miles (16.7 km).

== History ==
SC 421 was established by 1952 as a renumbering of US 1/US 78, which was realigned onto new four-lane routing just north of it. The route has remained unchanged since inception.

== Major intersections ==
The entire route is in Aiken County.

| Location | mi | km | Destinations | Notes |
|---|---|---|---|---|
| | 0.000 | 0.000 | US 1 north / US 78 east (Jefferson Davis Highway) – Aiken | Northbound lane only; southern terminus |
| Clearwater | 0.230 | 0.370 | US 278 / SC 125 (Atomic Road) – North Augusta, Augusta, Beech Island, Savannah River Site | Northern end of US 278 concurrency (northbound lane only); southbound lane exit onto interchange |
| Clearwater | 1.910 | 3.074 | SC 126 west (Belvedere-Clearwater Road) – Belvedere | Eastern terminus of SC 126 |
| Warrenville | 8.150 | 13.116 | SC 191 north (Old Graniteville Highway) – Graniteville, Vaucluse | Southern terminus of SC 191 |
| Aiken | 10.030 | 16.142 | SC 118 (Hitchcock Parkway / SC 19 Truck) | |
| Aiken | 10.360 | 16.673 | US 1 / US 78 (Jefferson Davis Highway) – Aiken | Northern terminus; no left turn allowed from SC 421 NB to US 1 SB/US 78 WB |
1.000 mi = 1.609 km; 1.000 km = 0.621 mi: Incomplete access
