= South Carolina Highway 430 =

State highway in South Carolina, United States

South Carolina Highway 430

Route information
- Maintained by SCDOT
- Length: 11.740 mi (18.894 km)

Major junctions
- South end: SC 23 / SC 23 Truck northeast of Edgefield
- US 25 in Edgefield
- North end: US 378 in Sumter National Forest

Location
- Country: United States
- State: South Carolina
- Counties: Edgefield

Highway system
- South Carolina State Highway System; Interstate; US; State; Scenic
← SC 421	→ SC 441

South Carolina Highway 430 (SC 430) is an 11.740-mile-long (18.894 km) state highway in the west central part of the U.S. state of South Carolina. The highway travels in a south-north orientation from just northeast of Edgefield northwest and then due north to a point on the edge of Sumter National Forest, all within Edgefield County.

== Route description ==
SC 430 begins at an intersection with SC 23 just northeast of Edgefield. This is also the northern terminus of SC 23 Truck, which begins concurrent with SC 430. The two highways head northwest, cutting across the northeast part of the city. They then intersect Meeting Street, which leads to the northbound lanes of U.S. Route 25 Business (US 25 Bus.). At this intersection, SC 23 Truck continues to the northwest, concurrent with the unsigned designation of SC 430 Conn. (which take on the Crest Road name). SC 430 turns right and heads to the north-northeast until it meets its northern terminus, at an intersection with US 378 on the southeastern edge of Sumter National Forest, in a rural part of the county.

SC 430 is not part of the National Highway System, a system of roadways important to the nation's economy, defense, and mobility.

== Major intersections ==
The entire route is in Edgefield County.

Location	mi	km	Destinations	Notes
	0.000	0.000	SC 23 (Columbia Road) – Edgefield, Johnston, Columbia	Southern end of SC 23 Truck concurrency; southern terminus of SC 430; northern terminus of SC 23 Truck
Edgefield	2.140	3.444	Meeting Street south / Crest Road east (SC 23 Truck south / SC 430 Conn. west) to US 25 – Edgefield, Greenwood	Northern end of SC 23 Truck concurrency; eastern terminus of SC 430 Conn.
Sumter National Forest	11.740	18.894	US 378 – McCormick, Saluda	Northern terminus
1.000 mi = 1.609 km; 1.000 km = 0.621 mi

== Edgefield connector route ==
South Carolina Highway 430 Connector
- Location: Edgefield
- Length: 0.180 mi (290 m)

South Carolina Highway 430 Connector (SC 430 Conn.) is a 0.180-mile (0.290 km) connector route that serves to connect U.S. Route 25 Business (US 25 Bus.) with the SC 430 mainline in the far northern part of Edgefield, which is in the central part of Edgefield County. It is known as Crest Road, is concurrent with SC 23 Truck, and is an unsigned highway.

The connector begins at an intersection with the SC 430 mainline (also known as Crest Road). and Meeting Street, which leads to US 25 Bus. south. Here, SC 23 Truck, which is concurrent with SC 430 southeast of this intersection, leaves the mainline and begins a concurrency with SC 430 Conn. The two highways travel to the northwest and feed into US 25 Bus. north. Here, SC 430 Conn. ends and SC 23 Truck follows US 25 Bus.
