= South Carolina Highway 126 =

State highway in South Carolina, United States

South Carolina Highway 126
- Belvedere-Clearwater Road

Route information
- Maintained by SCDOT
- Length: 4.200 mi (6.759 km)
- Existed: 1939–present

Major junctions
- West end: US 25 / SC 121 in Belvedere
- I-520 in North Augusta; US 1 / US 78 in Clearwater
- East end: SC 421 in Clearwater

Location
- Country: United States
- State: South Carolina
- Counties: Aiken

Highway system
- South Carolina State Highway System; Interstate; US; State; Scenic
← I-126	→ SC 127

South Carolina Highway 126 (SC 126) is a 4.200-mile (6.759 km) primary state highway in the U.S. state of South Carolina. It directly links Belvedere with Clearwater, with a small portion in North Augusta.

== Route description ==
SC 126 is a suburban highway that travels 4.2 miles (6.8 km) from U.S. Route 25 (US 25)/SC 121 in Belvedere to SC 421 in Clearwater. In both Belvedere and North Augusta, SC 126 is a four-lane road with median; in Clearwater it only has two lanes. The entire highway has few commercial entities, mainly functioning to connect neighborhoods in the area. It also has intermediate junctions with Interstate 520 (I-520) and US 1/US 78.

== History ==
SC 126 was established in 1939 as a new primary route and has remained unchanged since. The entire highway was paved by 1948 and widened in Belvedere and North Augusta by 2010.

== Future ==
The remaining two-lane section of SC 126 in Clearwater is planned to be widened to four lanes; however, no time-table has been set.

== Major intersections ==
The entire route is in Aiken County.

Location	mi	km	Destinations	Notes
Belvedere	0.000	0.000	US 25 / SC 121 (Edgefield Road) – Edgefield, North Augusta	Western terminus
North Augusta	1.290	2.076	I-520 – Augusta, Columbia, Atlanta	I-520 exit 21
Clearwater	3.560	5.729	US 1 / US 78 – Augusta, Aiken	
Clearwater	4.200	6.759	SC 421 (Augusta Road) – Augusta, Aiken	
1.000 mi = 1.609 km; 1.000 km = 0.621 mi
