= Zachariah Glenn Fulmer =

American politician

Member of the South Carolina House of Representatives from Aiken County
- In office 1972–1974
- In office 1967–1968

Personal details
- Born: March 27, 1940 (age 86) Foxtown, Aiken County, South Carolina
- Party: Democratic
- Occupation: farmer/businessman

Zachariah Glenn Fulmer (born March 27, 1940) was an American politician in the state of South Carolina. He served in the South Carolina House of Representatives as a member of the Democratic Party from 1972 to 1974 and 1967 to 1968, representing Aiken County, South Carolina. He is a farmer and businessman.
