= South Carolina Highway 121 =

Highway in South Carolina

South Carolina Highway 121

- Route of SC 121 highlighted in red

Route information
- Maintained by SCDOT
- Length: 134.200 mi (215.974 km)
- Existed: 1964–present
- Tourist routes: Woodpecker Trail; South Carolina Heritage Corridor: Nature Route; SC Heritage Corridor: Discovery Route

Major junctions
- South end: US 1 / US 25 / US 78 / US 278 / SR 10 / SR 121 at the GA state line near North Augusta
- I-20 in North Augusta; US 178 / SC 39 in Saluda; US 378 in Saluda; US 76 in Newberry; I-26 in Newberry; US 176 / SC 72 near Whitmire; US 321 / SC 9 / SC 72 in Chester
- North end: US 21 / SC 322 in Rock Hill

Location
- Country: United States
- State: South Carolina
- Counties: Aiken, Edgefield, Saluda, Newberry, Union, Chester, York

Highway system
- South Carolina State Highway System; Interstate; US; State; Scenic
← SC 120	→ SC 122

South Carolina Highway 121 (SC 121) is a 134.200-mile (215.974 km) major state highway that travels north and south in central parts of the U.S. state of South Carolina. The highway is actually part of a long multi-state highway that also exists in Florida and Georgia, as Florida State Road 121 and Georgia State Route 121, respectively.

== Route description ==
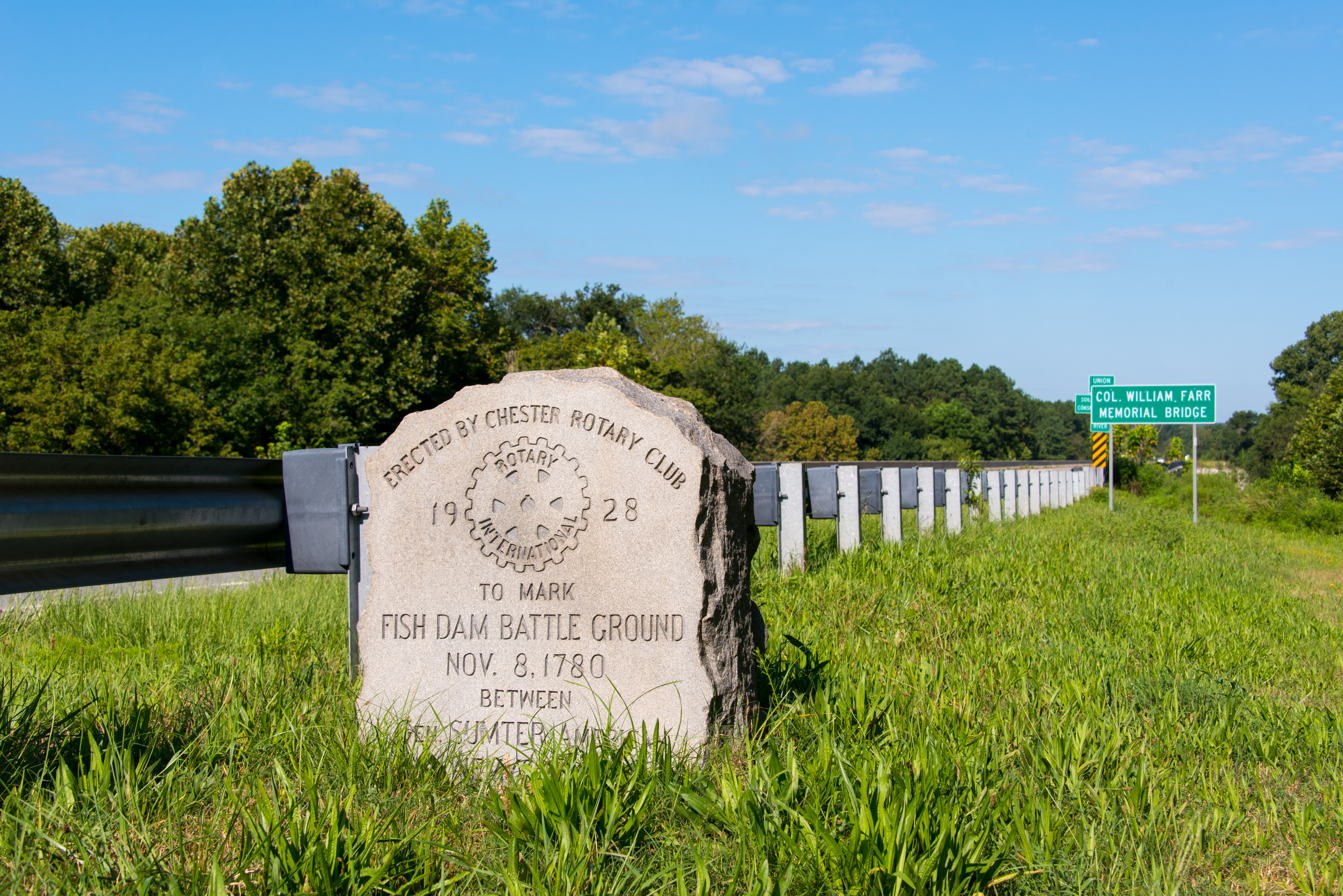
Monument to the Battle of Fishdam Ford, located on the east bank of the Broad River

SC 121 continues its concurrency with U.S. Route 25 (US 25) from Augusta, Georgia into North Augusta, South Carolina. In the Schultz Hill section of North Augusta, US 25/SC 121 leaves the concurrency with US 1 and US 78, and heads north. Still within North Augusta, it has an interchange with Interstate 520 (I-520) at exit 22 and I-20 (at exit 5).

In Trenton at the northern terminus of SC 19, US 25 turns to the north. From there the route becomes independent and it runs mainly through rural western South Carolina. Johnston is where the route serves as the northern terminus of SC 191 and later crosses SC 23.

In Saluda, SC 121 is overlapped by US 178/SC 39, then intersects US 378. The overlap with US 178/SC 39 ends at Travis Road. Later it crosses a bridge over the Saluda River and is then overlapped with SC 34 until it reaches Newberry. Barely inside Newberry, the route becomes the terminus of SC 395 and then has a major intersection with US 76. Further north it encounters a quarter-cloverleaf interchanges with I-26 (at exit 72).

North of Newberry, it encounters yet another concurrency with US 176, which it follows straight north before curving to the west as it enters Whitmire, where the routes make a sharp turn to the east and encounters the beginning of a long concurrency with SC 72. After a bridge over the Enoree River, the concurrency with US 176 ends just east of Whitmire.

SC 121/72 runs through Carlisle where it has another concurrency with SC 215, which ends east of the bridge over the Broad River, which contains a monument to an American Revolutionary battle known as the Battle of Fishdam Ford.

SC 121/72 does not encounter any major junctions for about 12 miles (19.3 km) until they reach Chester, where SC 121/72 has another concurrency, this time with US 321/SC 9. This concurrency runs southeast until US 321 branches off to the south at the southern terminus of US 321 Business (US 321 Bus.). The routes continue to the east along SC 97, running beneath a railroad bridge, and then turning toward the north. SC 9 makes a right turn at Lancaster Avenue, which is the eastern terminus of SC 9 Bus. SC 121/72/97 has an at-grade crossing with another railroad line leading to the city, and then SC 121/72 branches off to the right at Saluda Road (SC 72 Bus.), while SC 97 continues north.

The concurrency with SC 72 finally ends at SC 901 in Rock Hill. Within the city, it joins briefly with SC 5, before merging with its final concurrency, US 21. Traversing east of the downtown area, its journey ends at Cherry Road, where US 21 continues north towards Fort Mill, while also connecting with SC 322.

SC 121 is one of the most concurrent state highways in South Carolina. It shares long stretches of pavement with these two routes:

- US 25 from the Georgia state line to Trenton (20 miles)
- SC 72 from Whitmire to Rock Hill (46 miles, as well as the longest concurrency in South Carolina)

It has shorter concurrencies with US 1, 78, and 278 (altogether), SC 230, US 178, SC 39, SC 34, US 176, SC 215, US 321, SC 9, SC 97, SC 909, SC 5, and US 21.

== History ==
SC 121 had two previous stints in the state before its current routing was established. The first SC 121 was established in 1925 or 1926 as a new primary routing; it traversed from SC 27 in Aiken, northeast through Wagener and Pelion, to SC 2/SC 12 in Springdale. In 1928, it was renumbered as SC 215.

The second SC 121 was established in 1929 or 1930 as new primary routing; it traversed from US 21 in Branchville, east through Bowman, to SC 31 in Providence. In 1937 or 1938, SC 121 was extended along US 78 before branching off to end at SC 65; its eastern terminus was also extended to US 15. In 1940, SC 121 was extended southwest to SC 362, and east to SC 6 in Vance. In 1948, SC 121 was truncated on both ends, from US 21 to US 15; its routing to SC 61 became Farrell's Road (S-5-18). By 1952, it was extended east to SC 310 in Vance. In 1953, it was extended completely back to SC 6. In 1962-1964, the entire route was renumbered as SC 210.

The third, and current, SC 121 was established in 1962-1964, which formed a three-state route (continues south as Georgia State Route 121 and Florida State Road 121 to Lebanon Station, Florida). From North Augusta to Rock Hill, it was placed on concurrencies with various highways throughout the state; with exception around Whitmire, where it replaced part of SC 19. Its routing has remained unchanged since inception.

== Major intersections ==
County	Location	mi	km	Destinations	Notes
Savannah River		0.000	0.000	US 1 south / US 25 south / US 78 west / US 278 west / SR 10 west / SR 121 south (Gordon Highway) – Augusta	Continuation from Georgia
Savannah River		0.000– 0.005	0.000– 0.0080	South Carolina–Georgia line	
Aiken	North Augusta	0.188– 0.340	0.303– 0.547	5th Street Bridge / River North Drive	Interchange
Aiken	North Augusta	0.710	1.143	US 1 north / US 78 / US 278 east – Aiken	Northern end of US 1 and US 78/US 278 concurrencies
Aiken	North Augusta	0.860	1.384	Buena Vista Avenue east (SC 125 Conn. east) to US 78 west / US 1 south – Augusta	Southern end of SC 125 Conn. concurrency
Aiken	North Augusta	0.970	1.561	Buena Vista Avenue west (SC 125 Conn. west)	Northern end of SC 125 Conn. concurrency
Aiken	North Augusta	1.390	2.237	SC 125 / SC 230 north (Atomic Road) – North Augusta, Savannah River Site; SC 125 Truck begins	Southern end of SC 125 Truck/SC 230 concurrencies; southern terminus of SC 125 Truck and SC 230
Aiken	North Augusta	1.820	2.929	SC 230 north (Martintown Road / SC 125 Truck north) – Lake Thurmond	Northern end of SC 125 Truck/SC 230 concurrency
Aiken	North Augusta	3.590	5.778	US 25 Bus. south (Georgia Avenue) – Augusta	Northern terminus of US 25 Bus.
Aiken	North Augusta	4.610	7.419	SC 126 east (Belvedere Clearwater Road) – Clearwater	Western terminus of SC 126
Aiken	North Augusta	6.170	9.930	US 25 Conn. south to I-520	Northern terminus of US 25 Connector; I-520 exit 22
Aiken	North Augusta	7.020	11.298	I-20 – Columbia, Atlanta	I-20 exit 5
Edgefield	Trenton	20.360– 20.410	32.766– 32.847	US 25 north / SC 19 south – Edgefield, Aiken	Northern end of US 25 concurrency; northern terminus of SC 19
Edgefield	Trenton	20.940	33.700	West Wise Street east (SC 19 Conn. south) – Trenton Municipal Airport, Douglas Elementary School	Northern terminus of SC 19 Conn.; western terminus of West Wake Street
Edgefield		27.140	43.678	SC 191 south – Aiken	Northern terminus of SC 191
Edgefield	Johnston	28.380	45.673	SC 23 – Edgefield, Ridge Spring	
Saluda		36.440	58.644	SC 193 south – Ward	Northern terminus of SC 193
Saluda	Saluda	40.980	65.951	US 178 east / SC 39 south (Batesburg Highway) – Batesburg-Leesville, Ridge Spring	Southern end of US 178/SC 39 concurrency
Saluda	Saluda	41.180	66.273	US 378 (Church Street) – Lexington, McCormick	
Saluda	Saluda	41.530	66.836	US 178 west / SC 39 north (Greenwood Highway) to Travis Highway east (SC 178 Conn. east) / US 378 east / SC 194 – Greenwood, Columbia	Northern end of US 178/SC 39 concurrency; western terminus of US 178 Conn.
Newberry	Silverstreet	56.700	91.250	SC 34 west – Silverstreet, Greenwood	Southern end of SC 34 concurrency; to Ninety Six National Historic Site
Newberry		61.230	98.540	SC 34 east (Boundary Street) – Newberry	Northern end of SC 34 concurrency
Newberry		61.950	99.699	Dixie Drive east (SC 34 Conn. east) – Winnsboro	Western terminus of SC 34 Conn.
Newberry	Newberry	64.090	103.143	SC 395 south (Nance Street) – Newberry	Northern terminus of SC 395
Newberry		65.680	105.702	US 76 – Prosperity, Clinton	
Newberry		67.480– 67.519	108.599– 108.661	I-26 – Columbia, Spartanburg	I-26 exit 72
Newberry		73.500	118.287	US 176 east – Pomaria	Southern end of US 176 concurrency
Newberry	Whitmire	81.850	131.725	SC 72 west (Union Street) to SC 66 – Whitmire, Clinton	Southern end of SC 72 concurrency
Enoree River		82.337	132.509	Senator Marvin E. Abrams Bridge	
Union		82.360	132.546	US 176 north – Union	Eastern end of US 176 concurrency
Union		82.570	132.884	SC 72 Conn. west to US 176 west – Union	Eastern terminus of SC 72 Conn.
Union	Carlisle	91.550	147.335	SC 215 north (King Kennedy Street) – Santuc, Union	Western end of SC 215 concurrency
Chester		95.480	153.660	SC 215 south (Fairfield Road) – Monticello, Columbia	Eastern end of SC 215 concurrency
Chester	Chester	107.970	173.761	US 321 north / SC 9 north (J.A. Cochran Bypass) / West End Street north – Chester, Lockhart	Western end of US 321 and SC 9 concurrencies; southern terminus of West End Street
Chester	Chester	109.810	176.722	US 321 south / SC 97 south / US 321 Bus. north (Columbia Street) – Winnsboro, Great Falls	Eastern end of US 321 concurrency; western end of SC 97 concurrency; southern terminus of US 321 Bus.
Chester	Chester	111.030	178.685	SC 9 south / SC 9 Bus. north (Lancaster Highway) – Lancaster, Chester	Eastern end of SC 9 concurrency; southern terminus of SC 9 Bus.
Chester	Chester	112.050	180.327	SC 97 north (J.A. Cochran Bypass) / Saluda Road south – Chester, Hickory Grove	Eastern end of SC 97 concurrency
Chester	Lewis	117.270	188.728	SC 909 east (Rodman Road)	Western end of SC 909 concurrency
Chester	Lewis	117.370	188.889	SC 909 west (Aaron Burr Road)	Eastern end of SC 909 concurrency
York		123.940	199.462	SC 324 west – York	Eastern terminus of SC 324
York	Rock Hill	128.020	206.028	SC 72 east (Saluda Street) / SC 901 (Mount Holly Road) – Rock Hill, Edgemoor	Northern end of SC 72 concurrency
York	Rock Hill	128.230	206.366	SC 5 north (Heckle Boulevard)	Southern end of SC 5 concurrency
York	Rock Hill	130.610	210.196	US 21 south / SC 5 south (Main Street) to I-77 – Lancaster, Columbia	Southern end of US 21 concurrency; northern end of SC 5 concurrency
York	Rock Hill	131.070	210.937	SC 122 (Dave Lyle Boulevard) to I-77	To Catawba Reservation; interchange
York	Rock Hill	134.200	215.974	US 21 north / SC 322 west (Cherry Road) – Fort Mill	Northern end of US 21 concurrency; northern terminus; eastern terminus of SC 322
1.000 mi = 1.609 km; 1.000 km = 0.621 mi: Concurrency terminus

== Special routes ==
=== Chester business loop ===
South Carolina Highway 121 Business
- Location: Chester, South Carolina
- Length: 2.6 mi (4.2 km)
- Existed: 1964–c. 1987

SC 121 Business (SC 121 Bus.) was established in 1964 to run concurrently with SC 72 Bus.; through downtown Chester, via West End Street, Main Street and Saluda Street/Road. It was never part of mainline SC 121, as it bypassed Chester to the south and east with SC 72. It is unknown when the business loop was decommissioned.
