= South Carolina Highway 420 =

State highway in South Carolina, United States

South Carolina Highway 420

Route information
- Maintained by SCDOT
- Length: 4.930 mi (7.934 km)

Major junctions
- West end: US 178 in Shoals Junction
- East end: US 25 Bus. / SC 252 Truck in Ware Shoals

Location
- Country: United States
- State: South Carolina
- Counties: Greenwood

Highway system
- South Carolina State Highway System; Interstate; US; State; Scenic
← SC 419	→ SC 421

South Carolina Highway 420 (SC 420) is a 4.930-mile-long (7.934 km) state highway in the U.S. state of South Carolina. The highway connects Shoals Junction and Ware Shoals.

== Route description ==
SC 420 begins at an intersection with U.S. Route 178 (US 178; Mock Orange Road) in Shoals Junction, within Greenwood County where the roadway continues as Old Shoals Junction Road. It travels in a fairly northeasterly direction and crosses Dunns Creek before it enters Ware Shoals. It crosses over Turkey Creek just before meeting its eastern terminus, an intersection with US 25 Business and SC 252 Truck (South Greenwood Avenue). Here, the roadway continues as Honea Path Street.

== Major intersections ==
The entire route is in Greenwood County.

Location	mi	km	Destinations	Notes
Shoals Junction	0.000	0.000	US 178 (Mock Orange Road) / Old Shoals Junction Road south – Greenwood, Due West, Honea Path	Western terminus; roadway continues as Old Shoals Junction Road.
Ware Shoals	4.930	7.934	US 25 Bus. (South Greenwood Avenue / SC 252 Truck) / Honea Path Street north – Greenwood, Greenville	Eastern terminus; roadway continues as Honea Path Street.
1.000 mi = 1.609 km; 1.000 km = 0.621 mi
