= U.S. Route 25 in South Carolina =

Section of U.S. highway in South Carolina

U.S. Highway 25
- US 25 highlighted in red

Route information
- Maintained by SCDOT
- Length: 140.600 mi (226.274 km)
- Existed: 1927–present
- Tourist routes: SC Heritage Corridor: Discovery Route; SC Heritage Corridor: Nature Route

Major junctions
- South end: US 1 / US 25 / US 78 / US 278 / SR 10 / SR 121 at the Georgia state line near North Augusta
- I-20 in North Augusta; US 378 near Limestone; US 178 / US 221 / SC 72 in Greenwood; US 76 in Princeton; I-185 Toll near Canterbury; I-85 near Greenville; I-185 / US 29 near Greenville; US 123 near Greenville; US 276 in Travelers Rest
- North end: US 25 at the North Carolina state line near Travelers Rest

Location
- Country: United States
- State: South Carolina
- Counties: Aiken, Edgefield, McCormick, Greenwood, Laurens, Greenville

Highway system
- United States Numbered Highway System; List; Special; Divided; South Carolina State Highway System; Interstate; US; State; Scenic
← SC 24	→ I-26

U.S. Route 25 (US 25) is a 140.600-mile (226.274 km) United States Numbered Highway that travels from Brunswick, Georgia, to the Kentucky–Ohio state line, where Covington, Kentucky, meets Cincinnati, Ohio, at the Ohio River. In the U.S. state of South Carolina, it travels south to north in the western part of the state, serving the northern part of the Augusta metropolitan area, Greenwood, and Upstate South Carolina on its path from North Augusta to North Carolina in the Saluda Mountains, near Travelers Rest.

== Route description ==
=== ADHS corridor W ===
US 25, from Interstate 85 to the North Carolina state line, is part of the Appalachian Development Highway System (ADHS), which is part of Appalachian Regional Commission (ARC). Of the 30.7-mile (49.4 km) section of US 25, only 22.9 miles (36.9 km) was authorized for ADHS funding. In the 2013 fiscal year, South Carolina completed Corridor W and also became the first state to complete its entire ADHS miles among all 13 Appalachian states. The entire section of US 25 along Corridor W boasts a four-to-six-lane limited-access road, with interchanges at major intersections.

== History ==
Established in 1928 as an original U.S. Highway, it was assigned to the entirety of South Carolina Highway 21 (SC 21; a northern continuation of Georgia State Route 21 (SR 21) from Georgia), which was removed the same year. Traveling closely as it does today, it went from North Augusta to Travelers Rest, connecting the cities and towns of Edgefield, Greenwood, Ware Shoals, and Greenville.

In 1937, US 25 was rerouted in Greenville, moving onto College Avenue from Main Street to Buncombe Street. By 1961, US 25 was moved onto a new bypass east of North Augusta, leaving US 25 Business (US 25 Bus.). In 1963, Ware Shoals was bypassed east, leaving another US 25 Bus. In 1964, US 25 was rerouted onto new primary routing east of Travelers Rest, leaving Main Street to US 276 and Poinsett Highway downgraded to secondary (today now an unsigned US 25 Connector).

By 1969, US 25 was rerouted onto a western bypass of Greenville, replacing SC 250; the old alignment was replaced by US 25 Bus. Also in the same year, US 25 was given its current eastern bypass around Greenwood, leaving US 25 Bus. along its old alignment along Main and Montague Streets. In 1973, US 25 was rerouted in northern Greenville County onto new modern ascent along the Saluda Mountains; the old route was downgraded to secondary (Old Highway 25/S-23-969).

=== South Carolina Highway 21 ===
South Carolina Highway 21
- Location: North Augusta–Travelers Rest
- Existed: 1928

South Carolina Highway 21 (SC 21) was an original state highway that was established on a path as a northern continuation of Georgia State Route 21 (SR 21) from the Georgia state line at North Augusta to the North Carolina state line at Caesars Head State Park, northwest of Cleveland.

In about 1925, the portion north of Travelers Rest was shifted to the east, replacing the path of SC 29, with its northern terminus at the North Carolina state line at a point north-northeast of Cleveland. Its former path became SC 211 and is now part of US 276.

By the end of 1926, the path of the highway between Edgefield and Kirksey was rerouted, replacing part of SC 43.

In 1928, SC 21 was decommissioned, with its path replaced by US 25. SR 21 continued along US 25 in Georgia until 1981, when it was truncated to Millen, Georgia.

== Major intersections ==
County	Location	mi	km	Destinations	Notes
Savannah River		0.000	0.000	US 1 south / US 25 south / US 78 west / US 278 west / SR 10 west / SR 121 south (Gordon Highway) – Augusta	Continuation from Georgia
Savannah River		0.000– 0.005	0.000– 0.0080	South Carolina–Georgia state line	
Aiken	North Augusta	0.188– 0.340	0.303– 0.547	5th Street Bridge / River North Drive	Interchange
Aiken	North Augusta	0.710	1.143	US 1 north / US 78 / US 278 east – Aiken	Northern end of US 1 and US 78/US 278 concurrencies
Aiken	North Augusta	0.860	1.384	Buena Vista Avenue east (SC 125 Conn. east) to US 78 west / US 1 south – Augusta	Southern end of SC 125 Conn. concurrency
Aiken	North Augusta	0.970	1.561	Buena Vista Avenue west (SC 125 Conn. west)	Northern end of SC 125 Conn. concurrency
Aiken	North Augusta	1.390	2.237	SC 125 / SC 230 north (Atomic Road) – North Augusta, Savannah River Site; SC 125 Truck begins	Southern end of SC 125 Truck/SC 230 concurrencies; southern terminus of SC 125 Truck and SC 230
Aiken	North Augusta	1.820	2.929	SC 230 north (Martintown Road / SC 125 Truck north) – Lake Thurmond	Northern end of SC 125 Truck/SC 230 concurrency
Aiken	North Augusta	3.590	5.778	US 25 Bus. south (Georgia Avenue) – Augusta	Northern terminus of US 25 Bus.
Aiken	North Augusta	4.610	7.419	SC 126 east (Belvedere Clearwater Road) – Clearwater	Western terminus of SC 126
Aiken	North Augusta	6.170	9.930	To I-520 (US 25 Conn.)	Western terminus of US 25 Conn.; I-520 exit 22
Aiken	North Augusta	7.020	11.298	I-20 – Columbia, Atlanta	I-20 exit 5
Edgefield	Trenton	20.360	32.766	SC 19 south / SC 121 north – Aiken, Johnston	Northern end of SC 121 concurrency; northern terminus of SC 19
Edgefield	Edgefield	26.090	41.988	SC 23 east (Columbia Road) – Johnston	Southern end of SC 23 concurrency
Edgefield	Edgefield	26.540	42.712	SC 23 west (Main Street) – Modoc	Northern end of SC 23 concurrency
Edgefield	Edgefield	27.730	44.627	Meeting Street Road north to SC 430 – Saluda, Johnston	Southern terminus of Meeting Street Road
Edgefield		27.770	44.691	SC 23 Truck north (Crest Road / SC 430 Conn. east) to SC 430 – Johnston, Saluda	Southern end of SC 23 Truck concurrency; western terminus of SC 430 Conn.
Edgefield		30.820	49.600	SC 283 west – Plum Branch	Eastern terminus of SC 283
Edgefield		38.880	62.571	US 378 – Saluda, McCormick	
McCormick–Greenwood county line	No major junctions				
Greenwood		54.010	86.921	US 178 east – Columbia	Southern end of US 178 concurrency
Greenwood		55.260	88.932	SC 67 south (Callison Highway) – Callison	Northern terminus of SC 67
Greenwood		55.740	89.705	SC 225 north – Abbeville	Southern terminus of SC 225
Greenwood	Greenwood	56.910	91.588	US 221 south / US 25 Bus. north / US 178 Bus. west – McCormick	Southern end of US 221 concurrency
Greenwood	Greenwood	58.030	93.390	SC 34 (Ninety Six Highway) – Ninety Six	Interchange
Greenwood	Greenwood	61.640	99.200	US 221 north / SC 72 east / SC 72 Bus. west (Reynolds Avenue) – Laurens, Clinton	Northern end of US 221 concurrency; southern end of SC 72 concurrency
Greenwood	Greenwood	63.160	101.646	SC 254 (Cokesbury Road) – Cokesbury	
Greenwood	Greenwood	63.800	102.676	US 25 Bus. south / US 178 Bus. east / SC 72 west – Abbeville	Northern end of SC 72 concurrency
Greenwood	Hodges	69.780	112.300	US 178 west (Moorefield Street) to SC 185 – Anderson, Due West	Northern end of US 178 concurrency
Greenwood		70.600	113.620	SC 246 (Emerson Street) – Cokesbury, Hodges	
Greenwood		71.510	115.084	SC 254 south (Cokesbury Road) – Cokesbury	Northern terminus of SC 254
Greenwood	Ware Shoals	76.740– 76.790	123.501– 123.582	US 25 Bus. north (Greenwood Avenue) – Ware Shoals	Southern terminus of US 25 Bus.
Laurens		80.460	129.488	US 25 Bus. south / SC 252 – Ware Shoals, Laurens	Northern terminus of US 25 Bus.
Greenville	Princeton	86.810	139.707	US 76 east – Laurens	Southern end of US 76 concurrency
Greenville		87.910	141.477	US 76 west (Princeton Highway) – Honea Path	Northern end of US 76 concurrency
Greenville	Ware Place	97.630	157.120	SC 247 south (Cooley Bridge Road) – Belton	Northern terminus of SC 247
Greenville	Ware Place	97.730	157.281	SC 8 west (Pelzer Highway) / SC 418 east (Old Hundred Road) – Pelzer, Fountain Inn	Eastern terminus of SC 8; western terminus of SC 418
Greenville	Canterbury	102.700	165.280	SC 86 west (Bessie Road) – Piedmont	Eastern terminus of SC 86
Greenville		104.580	168.305	I-185 Toll (Southern Connector) – Spartanburg, Columbia, Greenville, Atlanta	I-185 exit 7
Greenville		107.890	173.632	SC 291 north (Augusta Highway) – Greenville	Southern terminus of SC 291
Greenville		110.220– 110.250	177.382– 177.430	I-85 – Spartanburg, Atlanta	I-85 exit 44
Greenville	Gantt	111.000	178.637	SC 20 (Piedmont Highway) to I-185 north / US 29 north – Greenville, Piedmont	I-185 exit 16 southbound
Greenville		111.176– 111.230	178.920– 179.007	I-185 south / US 29 south – Atlanta	I-185 exit 15 northbound
Greenville		112.440	180.955	SC 81 (Anderson Road) – Greenville, Anderson	
Greenville		113.790	183.127	US 123 (New Easley Highway) – Greenville, Easley, Clemson	
Greenville		114.786– 114.790	184.730– 184.737	SC 124 (Old Easley Highway) – Greenville, Easley	
Greenville		115.210	185.413	SC 253 (Blue Ridge Drive) – Greer, Easley	
Greenville		118.200	190.224	SC 183 (Farrs Bridge Road) – Greenville, Pickens	
Greenville	Travelers Rest	122.650– 122.790	197.386– 197.611	US 276 east (Poinsett Highway) – Greenville	Southern end of US 276 concurrency; no northbound exit, southbound left exit
Greenville	Travelers Rest	123.130– 123.280	198.159– 198.400	US 276 west (Main Street) – Cleveland, Caesars Head, Brevard	Northern end of US 276 concurrency; northbound left exit
Greenville	Travelers Rest	124.840	200.911	Poinsett Highway south – Travelers Rest	Northern terminus of US 25 Conn. and Poinsett Highway; eastern terminus of US 276 Conn.
Greenville		129.090	207.750	SC 290 east (Locust Hill Road) – Greer	Western terminus of SC 290
Greenville		129.870	209.006	SC 414 west (Bates Crossing Road)	Southern end of SC 414 concurrency
Greenville		129.930	209.102	SC 414 east – Tigerville	Northern end of SC 414 concurrency; to North Greenville University and Campbell's Covered Bridge
Greenville		133.590	214.992	SC 11 (Cherokee Foothills Scenic Highway) – Cleveland, Gowensville, Marietta	
Greenville		134.240	216.038	Old Highway 25 north – Camp Old Indian, Saluda, Poinsett Bridge Heritage Preserve	Southern terminus of Old Highway 25; former US 25 north; to Poinsett Bridge
Greenville		140.600	226.274	US 25 north – Hendersonville, Asheville	Continuation into North Carolina
1.000 mi = 1.609 km; 1.000 km = 0.621 mi: Concurrency terminus; Incomplete access

== See also ==
- Special routes of U.S. Route 25
- SC National Heritage Corridor | Belton Alliance

U.S. Route 25
Previous state: Georgia	South Carolina	Next state: North Carolina
