= Spiderweb, South Carolina =

Unincorporated community in Aiken County, South Carolina

Coordinates: 33°24′37″N 081°49′52″W

Spiderweb is an unincorporated community in Aiken County, South Carolina, United States.

Its name comes from a local school that was demolished.

In Popular Culture: The lack of cell phone reception in the area inspired the No Doubt song, titled Spiderwebs, in which Gwen Stefani recommends that the listener "leave a message and I'll call you back".
