= Special routes of U.S. Route 25 =

Special routes of U.S. Route 25

Highway system
- United States Numbered Highway System; List; Special; Divided

Several special routes of U.S. Route 25 (US 25) exist. In order from south to north, they are as follows.

== Statesboro bypass route ==
U.S. Highway 25 Bypass
- Location: Statesboro, Georgia
- Length: 4.9 mi (7.9 km)

U.S. Highway 25 Bypass (US 25 Byp.), in complete concurrency with State Route 67 Byp. (SR 67 Byp.), is the western half of the divided four-lane bypass, west around Statesboro, Georgia, also known as "Veterans Memorial Parkway". The eastern half is US 301 Byp., which is in concurrency with SR 73 Byp. The entire length of US 25 Byp. is part of the National Highway System, a system of routes determined to be the most important for the nation's economy, mobility, and defense.

== Waynesboro bypass route ==
U.S. Highway 25 Bypass
- Location: Waynesboro, Georgia
- Length: 5.7 mi (9.2 km)

U.S. Highway 25 Bypass (US 25 Byp.), in complete concurrency with SR 121 Byp., is a divided four-lane bypass, east around Waynesboro, Georgia. Only the southernmost portion of US 25 Byp. is part of the National Highway System, a system of routes determined to be the most important for the nation's economy, mobility, and defense.

== Augusta–North Augusta business loop ==
U.S. Route 25 Business
- Location: Augusta, Georgia–North Augusta, South Carolina
- Length: 4.4 mi (7.1 km)
- Existed: 1961–present

U.S. Route 25 Business (US 25 Bus.) is a 4.4-mile-long (7.1 km) business route of US 25 that connects Augusta, Georgia, with North Augusta, South Carolina. The highway begins at an interchange with US 1/US 25/US 78/US 278/SR 10/SR 121 (Gordon Highway) on the line between the Olde Town portion of the city of Augusta and downtown. Here, the business route runs concurrently with SR 28 to the west-northwest. SR 28 departs at 5th Street, heading toward the Government Center and an intercity bus station. US 25 Bus. crosses of some railroad tracks of the Norfolk Southern Railway at the intersection with 6th Street. The highway later turns to the north-northeast onto SR 4 (13th Street). US 25 Bus./SR 4 intesects Jones Street, which is the eastern terminus of the eastbound lanes of SR 104, and Reynolds Street, which is the eastern terminus of the westbound lanes of SR 104. US 25 Bus./SR 4 crosses the Savannah River on the James U. Jackson Memorial Bridge. About in the center of this bridge, SR 4 and 13th Street end at the South Carolina state line, and US 25 Bus. continues to the north-northeast on Georgia Avenue.

Almost as soon as US 25 Bus. crosses the river, it travels over The River Golf Club and curves to the north-northwest. At Center Street, the highway curves back to the north-northeast. The SC 125 Truck designation begins at the intersection with SC 125 at West Buena Vista Avenue. At Jackson Avenue, the highway curves to the northeast. US 25 Bus./SC 125 Truck intersections SC 230 (Martintown Road), and the truck route leaves the business route. US 25 Bus. curves to the east and reaches its northern terminus, an intersection with US 25/SC 121 (Knox Avenue) and the western terminus of Chalet North Road.

The following portions of US 25 Bus. are part of the National Highway System, a system of routes determined to be the most important for the nation's economy, mobility, and defense:

- The entire length of the SR 28 concurrency
- From the southern end of the SR 4 concurrency to the northern terminus

Major intersections

State	County	Location	mi	km	Destinations	Notes
Georgia	Richmond	Augusta	0.0	0.0	US 1 / US 25 / US 78 / US 278 (SR 10 / SR 121 / Gordon Highway) / SR 28 east (Broad Street east) – Louisville, Waynesboro, Columbia, Beech Island, Augusta Regional Airport	Southern end of SR 28 concurrency; southern terminus; northbound traffic must make a U-turn to access Gordon Highway; interchange
Georgia	Richmond	Augusta	0.1	0.16	SR 28 west (5th Street) – Government Center, Riverwalk Marina, Intercity bus station	Northern end of SR 28 concurrency
Georgia	Richmond	Augusta	1.1	1.8	SR 4 south (13th Street south) / Broad Street west – Sacred Heart Cultural Ctr., Meadow Garden House Musm., Medical District	Southern end of SR 4 concurrency
Georgia	Richmond	Augusta	1.2	1.9	Jones Street (SR 104 east)	Eastern terminus of eastbound lanes of SR 104 on a one-way street
Georgia	Richmond	Augusta	1.2	1.9	SR 104 west (Reynolds Street) to I-20	Eastern terminus of westbound lanes of SR 104 on a one-way street
Georgia	Richmond	Augusta	1.3	2.1	James U. Jackson Memorial Bridge	Crossing of the Savannah River
			1.4	2.3	Northern end of SR 4 concurrency; Georgia–South Carolina state line; northern terminus of SR 4 and 13th Street; southern terminus of Georgia Avenue	
South Carolina	Aiken	North Augusta	2.1	3.4	SC 125 south (East Buena Vista Avenue east) / SC 125 Truck begins / West Buena Vista Avenue west – Public Safety Complex, Riverview Park, Lions Field, Community Center	Southern end of SC 125 Truck concurrency; northern terminus of SC 125 and SC 125 Truck; western terminus of East Buena Vista Avenue; eastern terminus of West Buena Vista Avenue
South Carolina	Aiken	North Augusta	2.9	4.7	SC 230 / SC 125 Truck south (Martintown Road) – McCormick	Northern end of SC 125 Truck concurrency
South Carolina	Aiken	North Augusta	4.4	7.1	US 25 / SC 121 (Knox Avenue) / Chalet North Road east – Edgefield, Saluda	Northern terminus of US 25 Bus.; western terminus of Chalet North Road; northern end of Georgia Avenue name
1.000 mi = 1.609 km; 1.000 km = 0.621 mi: Concurrency terminus

== North Augusta connector route ==
U.S. Highway 25 Connector
- Location: North Augusta, South Carolina
- Length: 0.550 mi (885 m)

U.S. Highway 25 Connector (US 25 Conn.) is a 0.550-mile-long (0.885 km) connector route of US 25 that is completely unsigned. Its entire length is in the southwestern part of Aiken County. Nearly all the highway is in the northern part of North Augusta, with a very brief portion within Belvedere. As its name implies, it serves to connect US 25/SC 121 with Interstate 520 (I-520).

The connector route begins at a dead end. It travels to the west-southwest and immediately has an interchange with I-520 (Palmetto Parkway). Just after this interchange, the highway begins a curve to the northwest and intersects the Palmetto Parkway Trail. A short distance later, it very briefly cuts across part of Belvedere and then meets its northern terminus, an intersection with US 25/SC 121 (Edgefield Road). This intersection is on the North Augusta–Belvedere line.

Major intersections
The entire route is in Aiken County.

Location	mi	km	Destinations	Notes
North Augusta	0.000	0.000	Dead end	Southern terminus
North Augusta	0.130	0.209	I-520 (Palmetto Parkway) – Augusta, Columbia, Atlanta	I-520 exit 22
North Augusta–Belvedere line	0.550	0.885	US 25 / SC 121 (Edgefield Road) – North Augusta, Edgefield	Northern terminus
1.000 mi = 1.609 km; 1.000 km = 0.621 mi

== North Augusta truck route ==
U.S. Highway 25 Truck
- Location: North Augusta, South Carolina

== Edgefield alternate route ==
U.S. Highway 25 Alternate
- Location: Edgefield, South Carolina
- Existed: 1936–1954

U.S. Highway 25 Alternate (US 25 Alt.) is a former alternate route of US 25 in Edgefield, South Carolina. It went around Edgefield to the south and west, following Bauskett Street and Penn Street. It ended at US 25 (which is now US 25 Bus.) in downtown Edgefield. In 1954, it was downgraded to a regular state road. Eventually the Bauskett Street segment was turned into part of US 25 Truck.

== Edgefield business route ==
U.S. Highway 25 Business (US 25 Bus.) is a business route of US 25 in Edgefield, South Carolina. It goes through downtown Edgefield and shares a short concurrency with SC 23 Truck.

U.S. Highway 25 Business
- Location: Edgefield, South Carolina

== Edgefield truck route ==
U.S. Highway 25 Truck
- Location: Edgefield, South Carolina
- Length: 3.980 mi (6.405 km)

U.S. Highway 25 Truck (US 25 Truck) is a 3.980-mile (6.405 km) bypass of Edgefield, South Carolina, along Bauskett Street (S-19-10). Signage in the area shows a business banner on top of US 25, which goes through downtown Edgefield; it is in fact mainline US 25. The truck route is on a secondary road; it may be considered as a viable bypass.

== Greenwood business loop ==
U.S. Highway 25 Business
- Location: Greenwood, South Carolina
- Length: 4.840 mi (7.789 km)
- Existed: 1969–present

U.S. Highway 25 Business (US 25 Bus.) is a business route of US 25 in Greenwood, South Carolina. It is completely concurrent with US 178 Business, and it marks the western terminus of SC 34 and the eastern terminus of SC 10.

== Hodges alternate route ==
U.S. Highway 25 Alternate
- Location: Hodges, South Carolina
- Existed: 1940–1945

U.S. Highway 25 Alternate (US 25 Alt.) is a former alternate route of US 25 in Hodges, South Carolina. It connected US 178 to the US 25/US 178 concurrency southeast of Hodges. It was eventually decommissioned in an unknown date and re-signed to SC 185.

== Ware Shoals business loop ==
U.S. Highway 25 Business
- Location: Ware Shoals, South Carolina
- Length: 4.310 mi (6.936 km)
- Existed: 1963–present

U.S. Highway 25 Business (US 25 Bus.) is a 4.310-mile (6.936 km) business route of US 25 that is partially within the city limits of Ware Shoals, South Carolina. The highway is mostly within Greenwood County, but it does partially enter Abbeville County before reaching the Laurens County line. The highway also has a concurrency with SC 252.

County	Location	mi	km	Destinations	Notes
Greenwood	Ware Shoals	0.0	0.0	US 25 (Hwy 25) / SC 252 Truck – Greenwood	Southern terminus; southern end of SC 252 Truck concurrency
Greenwood	Ware Shoals	1.9	3.1	SC 420 (Smith Street) – Shoals Junction	Eastern terminus of SC 420
Greenwood	Ware Shoals	2.0	3.2	SC 252 (Chappells Highway) / SC 252 Bus. / SC 252 Truck – Honea Path, Greenville	SC 252 Truck terminus; southern end of SC 252 Bus. concurrency
Abbeville	Ware Shoals	2.7	4.3	Summit Street	Abbeville County line area
Laurens		4.3	6.9	US 25 / SC 252 / SC 252 Truck / SC 252 Bus. – Greenville, Laurens	Northern terminus; northern end of SC 252 Bus. concurrency; TO Indian Mound Road (Waterloo) via SC 252
1.000 mi = 1.609 km; 1.000 km = 0.621 mi

== Greenville business loop ==
U.S. Highway 25 Business
- Location: Greenville, South Carolina
- Length: 14.0 mi (22.5 km)
- Existed: 1969–1995

U.S. Highway 25 Business (US 25 Bus.) was established in 1968 or 1969 when US 25 was rerouted to bypass west of downtown Greenville, South Carolina. US 25 Bus. traveled along Augusta Road, Main Street, College Street, Buncombe Street, Rutherford Street, and Poinsett Highway; in 1975, it was rerouted onto Academy Street, removing it along Main Street. In 1995, it was decommissioned; Over half of the route was already overlapped with a U.S. Highway, while SC 20 and SC 291 were extended on parts of the former highway, leaving only a section of Augusta Road downgraded to secondary roads.

== Greenville–Travelers Rest alternate route ==
U.S. Highway 25 Alternate
- Location: Greenville–Travelers Rest, South Carolina

== Travelers Rest connector route ==
U.S. Highway 25 Connector
- Location: Travelers Rest, South Carolina
- Length: 1.100 mi (1.770 km)

U.S. Highway 25 Connector (US 25 Conn.) is an unsigned 1.100 miles (1.770 km) connector route in concurrency with US 276 Conn., along Poinsett Highway. It connects US 25 with US 276, in downtown Travelers Rest, South Carolina.

== Hendersonville business loop ==
U.S. Highway 25 Business
- Location: Hendersonville, North Carolina
- Length: 12.3 mi (19.8 km)
- Existed: 2003–present

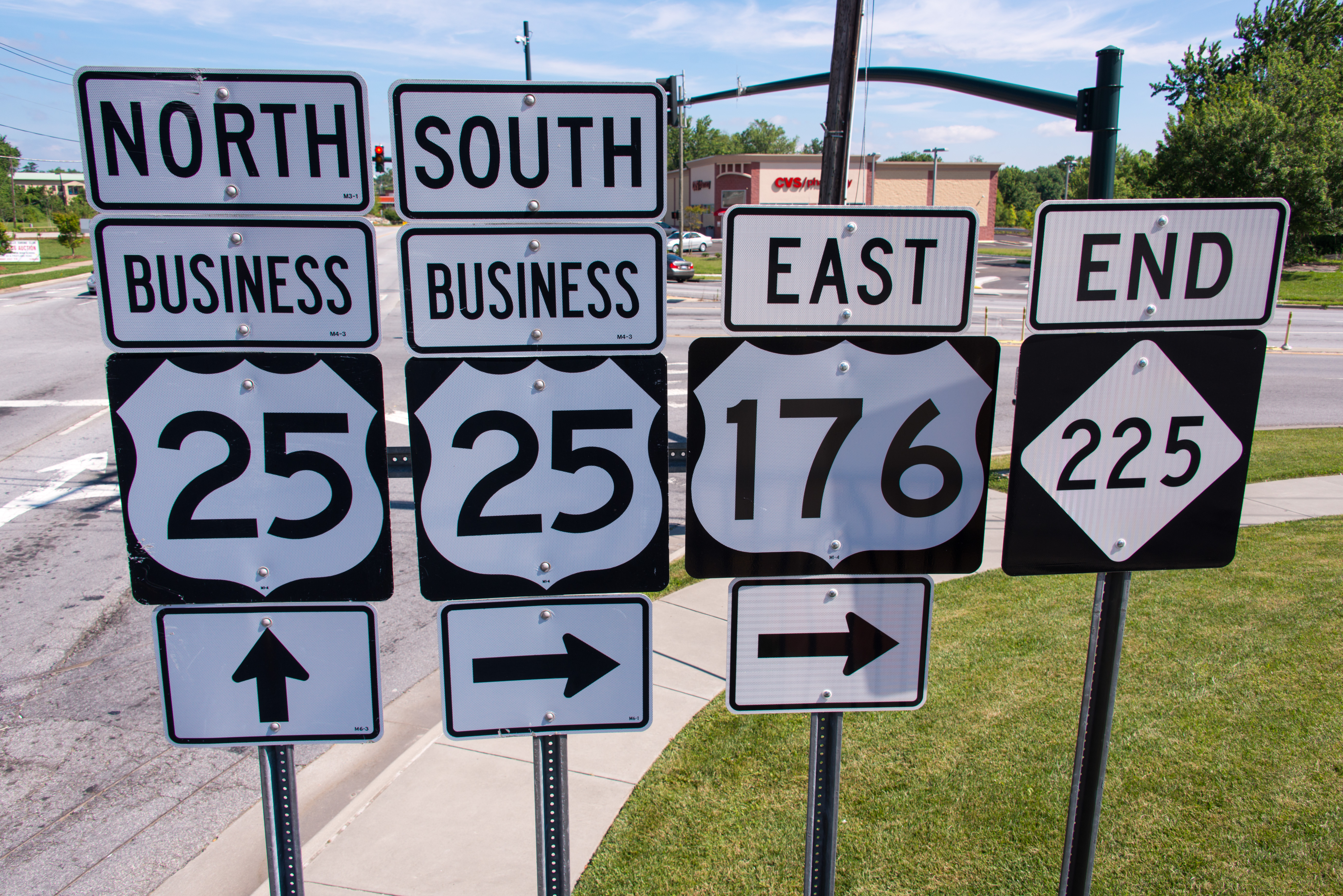
Sign assembly in Hendersonville, North Carolina

U.S. Highway 25 Business (US 25 Bus.) was established in 2003 when mainline US 25 was rerouted along I-26. Replacing a section of US 176, it traverses through East Flat Rock, downtown Hendersonville, and Mountain Home, North Carolina, before reconnecting with mainline US 25 near Fletcher.

== Hendersonville alternate route ==
U.S. Highway 25A
- Location: Hendersonville, North Carolina
- Length: 1.0 mi (1.6 km)
- Existed: 1944–1960

U.S. Highway 25A (US 25A) was a one-mile (1.6 km) alternate route in downtown Hendersonville, North Carolina, via Church Street, while mainline US 25 was on Main Street. In the early 1960s, it was renumbered as southbound US 25, with Main Street becoming northbound.

== Arden–Asheville alternate route ==
U.S. Highway 25A
- Location: Arden–Asheville, North Carolina
- Length: 8.5 mi (13.7 km)
- Existed: 1934–present

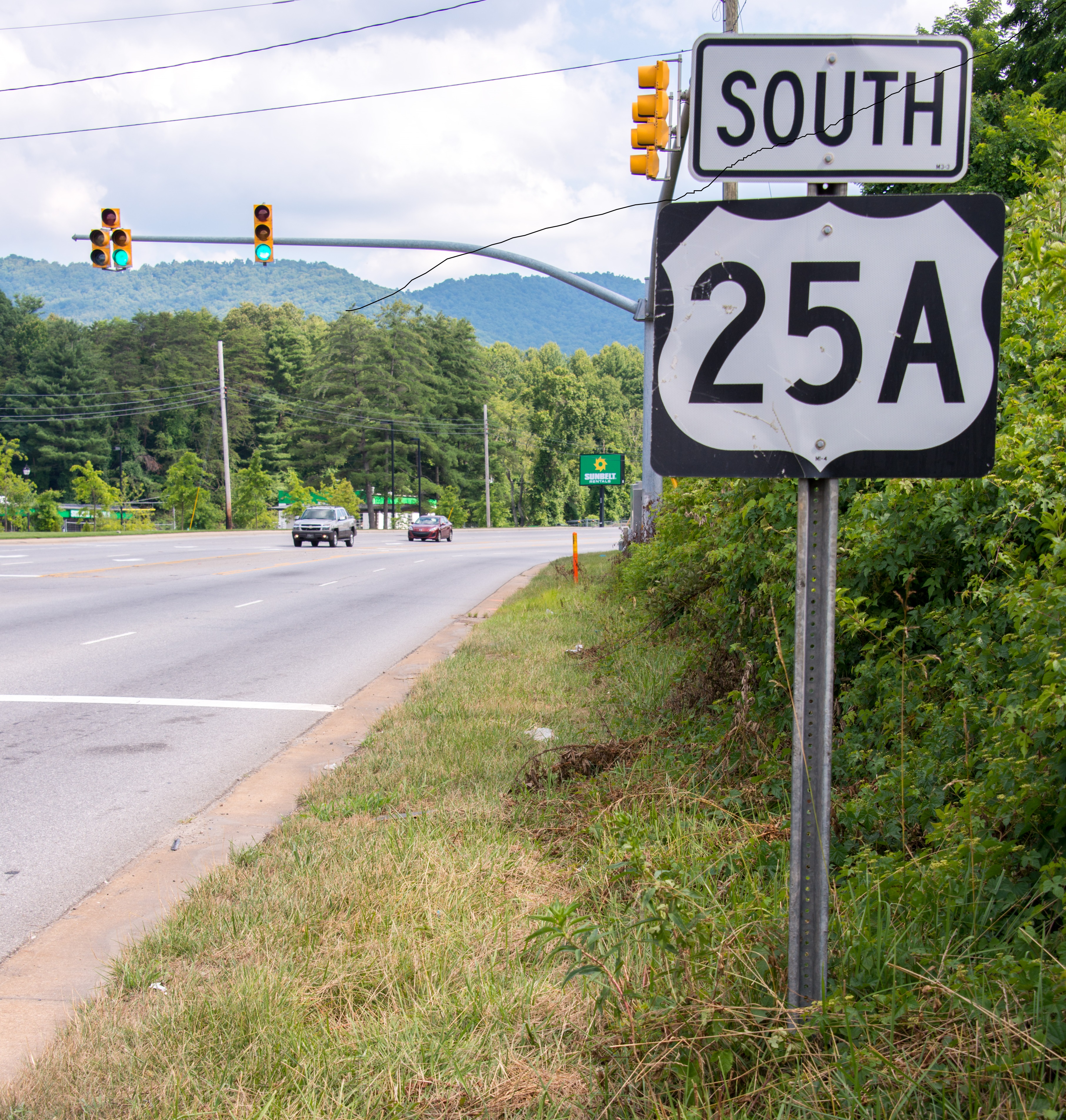
US 25A toward Arden, North Carolina

U.S. Highway 25A (US 25A) was established in 1934 as a renumbering of NC 69; the routing has remained unchanged since. US 25A begins in Arden, North Carolina, at the junction of NC 280 and US 25; travels north to Asheville near Biltmore Estate and junctions back at US 25.

== Marshall business loop ==
U.S. Highway 25 Business
- Location: Marshall, North Carolina
- Length: 5.5 mi (8.9 km)
- Existed: 1960–present

U.S. Highway 25 Business (US 25 Bus.) was established in 1960 when mainline US 25 was rerouted along new routing north of Marshall, North Carolina. In complete concurrency with US 70 Bus., it originally traversed along Main Street and Tillery Branch Road; in 1981, it was routed and extended further east along Ivy River Road.

== Corbin truck route ==
U.S. Route 25 Truck
- Location: Corbin, Kentucky

== Richmond business loop ==
U.S. Route 25 Business
- Location: Richmond, Kentucky
- Length: 3.654 mi (5.881 km)

U.S. Route 25 Business (US 25 Bus.) is a 3.654-mile-long (5.881 km) business loop located in Richmond, Kentucky. It runs along the original alignment of US 25 through downtown Richmond, while US 25 proper bypasses the city to the east. US 25 Bus. is signed concurrently with US 421 Bus. for its entire length, as US 421 also runs concurrent with US 25 through the Richmond area.

Major intersections
The entire route is in Madison County.

Location	mi	km	Destinations	Notes
Richmond	0.000	0.000	US 25 / US 421 (Berea Road / Eastern Bypass) / KY 876 west (Eastern Bypass)	Southern terminus; eastern terminus of KY 876
Richmond	1.027	1.653	KY 52 east (East Main Street)	South end of KY 52 overlap
Richmond	1.634	2.630	KY 388 north (North Second Street) / South Second Street	Southern terminus of KY 388
Richmond	1.780	2.865	KY 52 west (Lancaster Avenue)	North end of KY 52 overlap
Richmond	2.081	3.349	KY 169 north (Tates Creek Avenue) / Norwood Drive	Southern terminus of KY 169
	3.401	5.473	KY 3087 south (Old Lexington Road)	Northern terminus of KY 3087
	3.654	5.881	US 25 / US 421 (Lexington Road / Dr. Robert R. Martin Bypass) / KY 2875 north (McCord Lane) to I-75	Northern terminus; southern terminus of KY 2875; continues beyond US 25/US 421 as KY 2875
1.000 mi = 1.609 km; 1.000 km = 0.621 mi

== Lexington business loop ==
U.S. Route 25 Business
- Location: Lexington, Kentucky
- Length: 5.4 mi (8.7 km)

== Lexington truck route ==
U.S. Route 25 Truck
- Location: Lexington, Kentucky

== Dry Ridge business loop ==
U.S. Route 25 Business
- Location: Williamstown–Dry Ridge, Kentucky
- Length: 2.239 mi (3.603 km)

U.S. Route 25 Business (US 25 Bus.) is a 2.239-mile-long (3.603 km) business loop located in Dry Ridge, Kentucky. It runs along the original alignment of US 25 through downtown Dry Ridge, while US 25 proper bypasses to the east of Dry Ridge.

Major intersections
The entire route is in Grant County.

Location	mi	km	Destinations	Notes
Williamstown	0.000	0.000	US 25 / KY 22 (North Main Street)	Southern terminus; south end of KY 22 Bus. overlap
Williamstown	0.345	0.555	KY 3025 south (Arnie Risen Boulevard)	Northern terminus of KY 3025
Dry Ridge	1.309	2.107	KY 2501 north / Stewart Lane	Southern terminus of KY 2501
Dry Ridge	2.012	3.238	KY 22 Bus. west (Broadway Street)	North end of KY 22 Bus. overlap
Dry Ridge	2.239	3.603	US 25 (Scott Street)	Northern terminus
1.000 mi = 1.609 km; 1.000 km = 0.621 mi

== Covington business route ==
U.S. Route 25 Business
- Location: Covington, Kentucky

== Perrysburg–Toledo business route ==
U.S. Route 25 Business
- Location: Perrysburg–Toledo, Ohio

== Toledo business route ==
U.S. Route 25 Business
- Location: Toledo, Ohio

== Toledo–Erie alternate route ==
U.S. Route 25 Alternate
- Location: Toledo, Ohio–Erie, Michigan
