= Aiken Regional Medical Center =

Aiken Regional Medical Centers
- Original 1917 building

Geography
- Location: 302 University Parkway, Aiken, SC, United States
- Coordinates: 33.571164°N 81.761958°W

Services
- Beds: 273

History
- Founded: 1917

Links
- Website: http://www.aikenregional.com/
- Lists: Hospitals in the United States

Aiken Regional Medical Centers is located in Aiken, South Carolina on University Parkway near the University of South Carolina Aiken.

Aiken Regional Medical Centers opened its doors in 1917 as the Aiken Hospital and Relief Society. Except for several years in the early 1920s, the hospital has provided healthcare to the residents of Aiken and surrounding communities. Today, it is a 273-bed acute care facility.

== Services ==
Acute care and surgical hospital providing healthcare to the residents of Aiken and surrounding South Carolina communities. Specialized Cancer Care Institute of Carolina is located at Aiken Regional as well as a Women's LifeCare Center and the Aurora Pavilion for Behavioral Health Services.

=== Emergency medicine ===
The nurses, staff and board-certified emergency physicians treat approximately 48,000 patients a year. Aiken is part of the Door-to-Balloon Alliance (D2B), a national network of hospitals focused on reducing the "door-to-balloon" time between when a heart attack patient enters the hospital door to when the patient receives artery-clearing treatment.

=== Affiliation ===
Aiken Regional Medical Centers is owned and operated by Universal Health Services, Inc. (UHS), a King of Prussia, Pennsylvania-based company, which is one of the largest private healthcare management companies in the United States.

== History ==
Aiken Regional Medical Centers opened its doors in 1917 as the Aiken Hospital and Relief Society. Except for several years in the early 1920s, the hospital has provided quality healthcare to the residents of Aiken and surrounding communities. Today, it is a 273-bed acute care facility. Aiken Regional Medical Centers also houses a 14-bed inpatient rehabilitation facility offering physical therapy, occupational therapy, and speech therapy.

== Awards and accolades ==
- Received The Joint Commission's Gold Seal of Approval in 2012 and 2013
- Certificate from The SC Partnership for Health and The Carolinas Center for Medical Excellence for Reducing Hospital Readmissions by 20% for AMI
- Earned EPA's Energy STAR Certification for 2013 and 2014
- American Heart Association Gold Fit-friendly Worksite
- Aiken County Career and Technology Center Business Partner of the Year award
- Diabetes & Nutrition Teaching Center obtained reaccreditation by the American Diabetes Association-Diabetes Self-Management program
