= U.S. Route 278 in South Carolina =

U.S. highway in South Carolina

U.S. Highway 278
- Route of US 278 in South Carolina highlighted in red

Route information
- Auxiliary route of US 78
- Maintained by SCDOT
- Length: 146.130 mi (235.173 km)
- Existed: 1965–present
- Tourist routes: Hilton Head Scenic Byway

Major junctions
- West end: US 1 / US 25 / US 78 / US 278 / SR 10 / SR 121 at the Georgia state line near North Augusta
- US 25 / SC 121 in North Augusta; I-520 in North Augusta; US 1 / US 78 / SC 125 / SC 421 near Clearwater; US 301 / SC 125 in Allendale; US 321 in Fairfax; US 601 / SC 363 in Hampton; US 17 / SC 336 in Ridgeland; I-95 near Hardeeville
- East end: US 278 Bus. in Hilton Head Island

Location
- Country: United States
- State: South Carolina
- Counties: Aiken, Barnwell, Allendale, Hampton, Jasper, Beaufort

Highway system
- United States Numbered Highway System; List; Special; Divided; South Carolina State Highway System; Interstate; US; State; Scenic
← SC 277	→ SC 281

U.S. Route 278 (US 278) is a 146.130-mile (235.173 km) east–west United States highway that traverses through the South Carolina Lowcountry, from North Augusta to Hilton Head Island.

== Route description ==
After crossing the Savannah River from Georgia, US 278 bypasses downtown North Augusta, South Carolina to the south en route to Beech Island and Johnson Crossroads. It then forms a de facto northern boundary of the Savannah River Site, crossing into the property on a few occasions. The route then continues eastward and then southward through the communities of Barnwell, Kline, Allendale, Fairfax, Hampton, Varnville, Ridgeland, and Hardeeville where it meets I-95. US 278 shares the route between Ridgeland and Hardeeville with US 17.

From Allendale to Almeda, US 278 runs along the CSX Augusta Subdivision.

Upon reaching Hardeeville, the route heads eastward toward the Atlantic with large residential and commercial developments lining the spine of the road from Hardeeville through Okatie and Bluffton. The route crosses over Calibogue Sound onto Hilton Head Island. After a five-mile stretch in which the route was previously tolled, US 278 ends at US 278 Business on the southern portion of Hilton Head Island, just outside Sea Pines Plantation.

=== Cross Island Parkway ===
On Hilton Head Island, US 278 was previously routed along what is now US 278 Business until a new toll road, named the Cross Island Parkway, opened on January 16, 1998. The 6.8-mile (10.9 km) section of roadway cost $83 million to build and was funded with a combination of state funds, federal funds, state highway bonds and tolls.

The controlled access toll road has only one interchange along its route at Marshland Drive. It was the first toll road built in South Carolina in modern history. A majority of the road users pay their tolls using Palmetto Pass, South Carolina's system for electronic toll collection. Tolls were removed on June 30, 2021, not long after the last of the bonds sold to build the road were retired.

The completion of the Cross Island Parkway (a direct expressway connection from the north side to the south side of the island) has caused a great amount of commercial and residential development along the road. Before the toll road opened, it could take one hour to travel the 12-mile (19 km) route of what was then signed as US 278 (William Hilton Parkway) during peak tourism season. The Cross Island Parkway greatly relieved congestion on that road when it opened.

== History ==
US 278 was established, in South Carolina, in 1965, traveling from Augusta, Georgia to Hilton Head Island. Crossing the Savannah River, in concurrency with US 1/US 25/US 78/SC 121, it then overlapped with SC 125 on Atomic Road, to Beech Island. Replacing SC 28 from Beech Island to Almeda, where it then replaced SC 128, going through Ridgeland, to Old House. Replacing part of SC 462, it went south into Bluffton and then east into Hilton Head Island, replacing part of SC 46.

Throughout the 1980s, US 278 was widen to four-lane, in phases, east of SC 170, in Bluffton. In 1996-1997, US 278 was rerouted south of Ridgeland to Hardeeville, then east on new primary routing to SC 170, in Bluffton. Its former routing was replaced by SC 336 to Old House and SC 462 to SC 170. In 1998, US 278 was rerouted onto new routing along the west side of Hilton Head Island; known as the Cross Island Parkway, the toll road provides quicker access to the far south end of the island. The old alignment, in Hilton Head Island, became US 278 Business.

=== Tolls ===
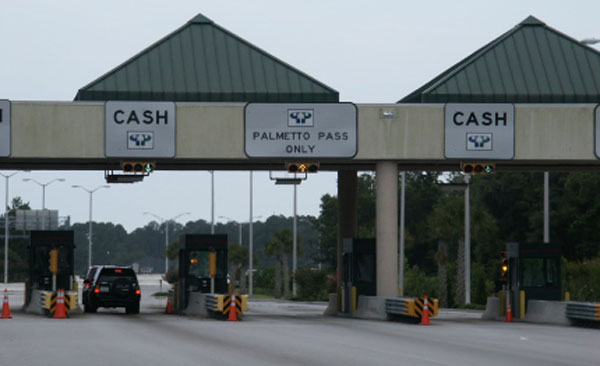
Cross Island Parkway Toll Plaza

Toll rates, for 2-axle vehicles, along Cross Island Parkway were $1.25 at the toll plaza and $1.00 at the Marshland Road/Spanish Wells Road interchange. Each additional axle was $1.00 (plaza and ramps). The toll plaza had both electronic toll collection (ETC) and cash lanes, which were staffed 24 hours a day; Marshland Road/Spanish Wells Road interchange accept only ETC or exact change only. Those that did not have exact change or do not pay the toll had five days to contact the Cross Island Parkway Customer Service Center to make a payment; after that time, a violation notice was mailed. Travelers that made a mistake of taking the toll road may request a "Turn Around Pass", which gives them ten minutes to continue along the highway, turn around at the roundabout and return the pass at the toll plaza on the return trip.

On July 1, 2021, the tolls were removed because the final bond payment was paid on the $81 million road that was opened in 1998.

== Major intersections ==
County	Location	mi	km	Destinations	Notes
Savannah River		0.000	0.000	US 1 south / US 25 south / SR 121 south / US 78 west / US 278 west / SR 10 west (Gordon Highway) – Augusta	Continuation into Georgia
Savannah River		0.000– 0.005	0.000– 0.0080	South Carolina–Georgia state line	
Aiken	North Augusta	0.188– 0.340	0.303– 0.547	5th Street Bridge / River North Drive	Interchange
Aiken	North Augusta	0.640– 0.710	1.030– 1.143	US 25 / SC 121 north – North Augusta, Edgefield	East end of freeway section; eastern end of US 25 and SC 121 concurrencies
Aiken	North Augusta	0.870	1.400	Buena Vista Avenue (SC 125 Conn. west) to I-20 / SC 230	Right-in/right-out interchange; westbound exit and entrance; eastern terminus of SC 125 Conn.
Aiken	North Augusta	1.560– 1.950	2.511– 3.138	I-520 (Palmetto Parkway) – Augusta, Columbia, Atlanta	I-520 exit 17
Aiken	Clearwater	2.380	3.830	US 1 north / US 78 east (Jefferson Davis Highway east) / SC 421 begins – Aiken, North Augusta, Clearwater	Interchange; eastern end of US 1/US 78 concurrencies; western end of SC 421 concurrency; southern terminus of SC 421
Aiken	Clearwater	2.380– 2.465	3.830– 3.967	SC 125 north (Atomic Road) – North Augusta	Eastern end of SC 421 concurrency (eastbound only); western end of SC 125 concurrency; interchange
Aiken	Beech Island	7.270– 7.500	11.700– 12.070	SC 28 west (Sand Bar Ferry Road) / SC 125 south (Atomic Road) – Savannah River Site, Augusta	Eastern end of SC 125 concurrency; eastern terminus of SC 28; interchange
Aiken		13.480	21.694	SC 302 (Silver Bluff Road) – Jackson, Aiken	
Aiken	New Ellenton	19.690	31.688	SC 19 north – New Ellenton, Aiken, Savannah River Site	Southern terminus of SC 19
Aiken		29.060	46.768	SC 781 east – Williston, Charleston	Western terminus of SC 781
Barnwell		32.730	52.674	SC 39 – Williston	
Barnwell		41.170	66.257	SC 37 north – Elko, Williston	Southern terminus of SC 37
Barnwell	Barnwell	43.500	70.006	SC 64 west (Dunbarton Boulevard) – Savannah River Site	Western end of SC 64 concurrency
Barnwell	Barnwell	43.760	70.425	SC 70 east (Allen Street) / Dunbarton Boulevard – Denmark	Western terminus of SC 70
Barnwell	Barnwell	44.100	70.972	SC 64 east (Hagood Avenue) – Walterboro	Eastern end of SC 64 concurrency
Barnwell	Barnwell	45.430	73.112	SC 3 north (Marlboro Avenue) – Columbia	Western end of SC 3 concurrency
Barnwell		46.670	75.108	SC 3 south – Sylvania	Eastern end of SC 3 concurrency
Barnwell		46.900	75.478	SC 300 south – Ulmer	Northern terminus of SC 300
Allendale	Allendale	60.610	97.542	US 301 north (Burton's Ferry Highway) – Walterboro	Western end of US 301 concurrency; to USC Salkehatchie
Allendale	Allendale	60.920	98.041	US 301 south (Main Street) / SC 125 north (Railroad Avenue) – Savannah River Site, Augusta, Sylvania	Eastern end of US 301 concurrency
Allendale	Fairfax	66.370	106.812	US 321 (Hampton Avenue) – Estill, Savannah, Orangeburg, Columbia	To USC Salkehatchie
Hampton	Hampton	75.330	121.232	SC 363 west (Shaw Drive) – Lake Warren State Park	Western end of SC 363 concurrency
Hampton	Hampton	75.490	121.489	US 601 north (Hoover Street) – Orangeburg	Western end of US 601 concurrency
Hampton	Hampton	76.050	122.391	US 601 south (First Street) – Estill, Savannah	Eastern end of US 601 concurrency
Hampton	Hampton	76.240	122.696	SC 363 east (Third Street) – Walterboro, Charleston	Eastern end of SC 363 concurrency
Hampton	Varnville	78.130	125.738	SC 63 east (Main Street) – Walterboro	Western terminus of SC 63
Hampton	Almeda	80.240	129.134	SC 68 east (Yemassee Highway) – Yemassee	Western terminus of SC 68
Jasper	Grays	91.870	147.850	SC 3 north (Heritage Road) – Early Branch	Southern terminus of SC 3
Jasper	Gillisonville	96.750	155.704	SC 462 west (Gillison Branch Road) – Pineland	Western end of SC 462 concurrency
Jasper		97.570	157.024	SC 462 east (Morgandollar Road) – Coosawhatchie	Eastern end of SC 462 concurrency
Jasper		102.310	164.652	SC 652 west (Calf Pen Bay Road) – Pineland	Eastern terminus of SC 652
Jasper	Ridgeland	106.288	171.054	Russell Street south (US 278 Conn. east) / Town Square east	Western terminus of US 278 Conn. and Town Square; northern terminus of Russell Street
Jasper	Ridgeland	106.370	171.186	3rd Avenue west (US 278 Conn. west)	Eastern terminus of US 278 Conn., which takes on the 3rd Avenue name
Jasper	Ridgeland	106.640	171.620	US 17 north (Jacob Smart Boulevard) – Charleston	Western end of US 17 concurrency
Jasper	Ridgeland	106.780	171.846	SC 336 (Main Street) – Tillman, Beaufort, Hilton Head Island	
Jasper	Ridgeland	109.050	175.499	SR 13 south to I-95 – Savannah, Florence	Northern terminus of SC 13
Jasper		119.440	192.220	US 17 south (Whyte Hardee Boulevard) – Hardeeville	Eastern end of US 17 concurrency
Jasper		119.730	192.687	I-95 – Savannah, Florence	I-95 exit 8
Beaufort		127.580– 127.601	205.320– 205.354	SC 170 (Okatie Highway) – Savannah, Beaufort	To Parris Island; interchange
Beaufort	Bluffton	133.510	214.864	SC 46 west (Bluffton Road) – Bluffton	Eastern terminus of SC 46
Beaufort	Bluffton	137.293	220.952	Bluffton Parkway	Interchange; westbound exit and eastbound entrance
Beaufort	Atlantic Intracoastal Waterway			J. Wilton Graves Bridge	
Beaufort	Hilton Head Island	140.720– 141.102	226.467– 227.082	US 278 Bus. east (William Hilton Parkway east)	West end of Cross Island Parkway; western terminus of US 278 Bus.; provides access to Hilton Head Airport
Beaufort	Hilton Head Island	143.290– 143.497	230.603– 230.936	Marshland Road / Spanish Wells Road	East end of Cross Island Parkway
Beaufort	Hilton Head Island	143.854	231.511	Toll plaza (closed)	
Beaufort	Hilton Head Island	144.331	232.278	Charles E. Fraser Bridge over Broad Creek	
Beaufort	Hilton Head Island	146.130	235.173	US 278 Bus. west (William Hilton Parkway) / Greenwood Drive / Pope Avenue – Sea Pines, Harbour Town, Beaches	Roundabout; eastern terminus of US 278 and US 278 Bus.
1.000 mi = 1.609 km; 1.000 km = 0.621 mi: Concurrency terminus; Closed/former; Incomplete access

== See also ==
- Special routes of U.S. Route 278

U.S. Route 278
Previous state: Georgia	South Carolina	Next state: Terminus
