= South Carolina Highway 363 =

State highway in South Carolina, United States

South Carolina Highway 363

Route information
- Maintained by SCDOT
- Length: 13.270 mi (21.356 km)
- Existed: 1940–present

Major junctions
- West end: US 321 north of Luray
- US 278 in Hampton; US 601 in Hampton
- East end: SC 63 near Varnville

Location
- Country: United States
- State: South Carolina
- Counties: Hampton

Highway system
- South Carolina State Highway System; Interstate; US; State; Scenic
← SC 362	→ SC 375

South Carolina Highway 363 (SC 363) is a 13.270-mile-long (21.356 km) state highway in the U.S. state of South Carolina. The highway is designated on an east–west direction, from U.S. Route 321 (US 321) in Luray to SC 63 just outside Varnville.

== Major intersections ==
The entire route is in Hampton County.

Location	mi	km	Destinations	Notes
	0.000	0.000	US 321 (Columbia Highway) – Estill, Fairfax	Western terminus
Hampton	8.060	12.971	US 278 west (Elm Street W) / Shaw Drive – Augusta	Western end of US 278 concurrency
Hampton	8.220	13.229	US 601 north (Hoover Street S) – [[, South Carolina|]]	Western end of US 601 concurrency
Hampton	8.780	14.130	US 601 south (1st Street W) – Savannah	Eastern end of US 601 concurrency
Hampton	8.970	14.436	US 278 east (Elm Street E) / 3rd Street E – Ridgeland	Eastern end of US 278 concurrency
	13.270	21.356	SC 63 (Walterboro Highway)	Eastern terminus
1.000 mi = 1.609 km; 1.000 km = 0.621 mi: Concurrency terminus
