= South Carolina Highway 125 =

State highway in South Carolina

South Carolina Highway 125

Route information
- Maintained by SCDOT
- Length: 56.212 mi (90.464 km)
- Existed: 1938–present

Major junctions
- South end: US 278 / US 301 in Allendale
- US 278 / SC 28 in Beech Island; US 1 / US 78 / US 278 / SC 421 in Clearwater; US 25 / SC 121 / SC 125 Truck / SC 230 in North Augusta; SC 125 Conn. in North Augusta
- North end: US 25 Bus. / SC 125 Truck in North Augusta

Location
- Country: United States
- State: South Carolina
- Counties: Allendale, Barnwell, Aiken

Highway system
- South Carolina State Highway System; Interstate; US; State; Scenic
← SC 124	→ I-126

South Carolina Highway 125 (SC 125) is a 56.212-mile (90.464 km) primary state highway in the U.S. state of South Carolina. The highway serves as a direct route between Allendale and Augusta, Georgia, through the Savannah River Site (SRS); and an alternate to U.S. Route 278 (US 278).

== Route description ==
SC 125 is predominantly a two-lane rural highway, traveling in a northwesterly direction for 56.2 miles (90.4 km). Beginning in downtown Allendale, it is also known as the Augusta Highway and travels northeast to Martin before entering Barnwell County. Soon after entering Barnwell County is the Savannah River Site, which is limited to through traffic only. After a 17.3-mile (27.8 km) drive, and well into Aiken County, travelers exit the Savannah River Site and enter the town of Jackson. Continuing north, on what is now called Atomic Road, SC 125 joins a concurrency with US 278 from Beech Island to Clearwater. Entering North Augusta, it crosses Interstate 520 (I-520) without an interchange and connects with US 25 before the road ends at Buena Vista Avenue. Going west on Buena Vista Avenue, it meets US 25 Business at Georgia Avenue where it ends, .7 miles (1.1 km) from Augusta.

=== Savannah River Site ===
SC 125 is the only highway through which the public is allowed to travel through the Savannah River Site. However, for the 17.3 miles (27.8 km) stretch it travels through SRS, vehicles are prohibited from stopping except for emergencies. Mile-markers going north to south help travelers count the miles before they are out of the restricted area. The highway is flanked with trees and fences and, on occasion, defunct roads crossing the highway with gates restricting access; the biggest being the former SC 64 interchange near mile marker 8. Though the highway is maintained by SCDOT, it is patrolled by federal security; the speed limit throughout is 55 miles per hour (89 km/h).

Prior to 2006, checkpoints were located at both ends of SC 125. When arriving at the entrance checkpoint, drivers would receive a pass and may also have their car searched at that time. Drivers were required to return the pass at the exit checkpoint; for those that drove too quickly to the other end would be issued a speeding ticket. Drivers that failed to either return the pass or arrive later than expected could be withheld for further questioning by authorities. After 2006, the checkpoints were removed along route, though checkpoints still exist at some roads that go deeper into the Savannah River Site.

== History ==
The highway was originally established around 1938 as a new primary routing from US 1/US 78 in Hamburg to US 25 in North Augusta. In 1953, SC 125 was rerouted onto Atomic Road and extended south along new four-lane primary routing to Beech Island, connecting with SC 28; then continuing south, through Jackson, to the Savannah River Site, ending at the gate. In 1965, US 278 was overlapped between Clearwater to Beech Island. Between 1968 and 1970, SC 125 was extended southeast again through the Savannah River Site, ending at its current southern terminus in Allendale; SC 125 replaced what was SC 28 prior to 1951 and replaced part of SC 641, north of Allendale.

== Major intersections ==
County	Location	mi	km	Destinations	Notes
Allendale	Allendale	0.000	0.000	US 278 (Railroad Avenue) / US 301 (Main Street) – Barnwell, Walterboro, Sylvania	Southern terminus; to USC Salkehatchie
Allendale		8.390	13.502	SC 3 (River Road) – Barnwell, Estill	
Barnwell	No major junctions				
Aiken		43.710	70.344	SC 302 north (Silver Bluff Road) – Aiken	Southern terminus of SC 302
Aiken	Beech Island	48.280	77.699	US 278 east (Williston Road) / SC 28 west (Sand Bar Ferry Road) – Barnwell, Augusta	Southern end of US 278 concurrency; eastern terminus of SC 28; interchange
Aiken	Clearwater	53.020	85.327	US 1 / US 78 / US 278 west to SC 421 – Clearwater, Aiken, Augusta	Northern end of US 278 concurrency; interchange
Aiken	North Augusta	55.055	88.602	US 25 / SC 121 / SC 230 north (Martintown Road / SC 125 Truck north) – Edgefield, Augusta	Southern terminus of SC 125 Truck and SC 230
Aiken	North Augusta	55.348	89.074	East Buena Vista Avenue east (SC 125 Conn. south)	Northern terminus of SC 125 Conn.; both highways use the East Buena Vista Avenue name.
Aiken	North Augusta	56.212	90.464	US 25 Bus. (Georgia Avenue / SC 125 Truck south) / Buena Vista Avenue west – Edgefield, Augusta	Northern terminus of SC 125 and SC 125 Truck; roadway continues as Buena Vista Avenue.
1.000 mi = 1.609 km; 1.000 km = 0.621 mi: Concurrency terminus

== Special routes ==
=== North Augusta connector route ===
South Carolina Highway 125 Connector
- Location: North Augusta
- Length: 0.772 mi (1,242 m)

South Carolina Highway 125 Connector (SC 125 Conn.) is a 0.772-mile-long (1.242 km) connector route that is unsigned. It travels completely within the southwestern part of Aiken County. Its entire length is within the southern part of North Augusta.

The connector begins at an intersection with the southbound lanes of U.S. Route 1 (US 1), which is also the westbound lanes of US 78/US 278 (Jefferson Davis Highway). There is no access from Jefferson Davis Highway north to East Buena Vista Avenue or vice versa. SC 125 Conn. travels to the northwest and immediately curves to the west-northwest. At an intersection with US 25/SC 121 (East Martintown Road), it turns right onto those highways and travels concurrently with them to the north-northwest. It takes the next left, onto another segment of East Buena Vista Avenue, and travels to the west-southwest. Immediately, it curves to the northwest. Just after an intersection with the western terminus of Floyd Street, it resumes its west-northwest direction. It then meets its northern terminus, an intersection with the SC 125 mainline (known as East Buena Vista Avenue west of here and Atomic Road north of here).

The entire route is in North Augusta, Aiken County.

mi	km	Destinations	Notes
0.000	0.000	Jefferson Davis Highway south (US 1 south / US 78 west / US 278 west)	No access from US 1 north/US 78 east/US 278 east to SC 125 Truck or vice versa; southern terminus
0.190	0.306	East Martintown Road south (US 25 south / SC 121 south)	Southern end of US 25/SC 121 concurrency
0.300	0.483	East Martintown Road north (US 25 north / SC 121 north)	Northern end of US 25/SC 121 concurrency
0.772	1.242	SC 125 (East Buena Vista Avenue west / Atomic Road east)	Northern terminus
1.000 mi = 1.609 km; 1.000 km = 0.621 mi: Concurrency terminus; Incomplete access

=== North Augusta truck route ===
South Carolina Highway 125 Truck
- Location: North Augusta
- Length: 1.730 mi (2.784 km)

South Carolina Highway 125 Truck (SC 125 Truck) is a 1.730-mile-long (2.784 km) truck route of SC 125 that travels completely within the southwestern part of Aiken County. Its entire length is within the southern part of North Augusta.

The truck route begins at an intersection with US 25/SC 121 (East Martintown Road). This intersection is also the eastern terminus of SC 230. US 25, SC 121, SC 125 Truck, and SC 230 travel concurrently to the northwest. The roadway is a retail corridor with many businesses along its path. At an intersection with Knox Avenue, US 25/SC 121 split off to the north, while SC 125 Truck and SC 230 continue to the northwest on East Martintown Road. Approximately 0.5 miles (0.80 km) later, they intersect US 25 Business (US 25 Bus.; Georgia Avenue). Here, SC 125 Truck turns left onto the business route to the southwest, while SC 230 continues to the northwest. At the southern terminus of Carolina Avenue, US 25 Bus. and SC 125 Truck curves to the south-southwest. At an intersection with the northern terminus of SC 125 (Buena Vista Avenue), the truck route ends, and US 25 Bus. continues to the south-southwest.

The entire route is in North Augusta, Aiken County.

mi	km	Destinations	Notes
0.000	0.000	US 25 south / SC 121 south / SC 230 begins (East Martintown Road south) to US 1 / US 78 / US 278 – Augusta; SC 125 (Atomic Road) – Savannah River Site, North Augusta	Southern end of US 25/SC 121 and SC 230 concurrencies; southern terminus of SC 125 Truck; eastern terminus of SC 230
0.430	0.692	US 25 north / SC 121 north (Knox Avenue) – Edgefield	Northern end of US 25/SC 121 concurrency
0.970	1.561	US 25 Bus. north (Georgia Avenue north) – Newberry, Greenville SC 230 west (East Martintown Road) to I-20 – Clarks Hill, McCormick	Northern end of SC 230 concurrency; southern end of US 25 Bus. concurrency
1.730	2.784	US 25 Bus. south (Georgia Avenue south) SC 125 south (Buena Vista Avenue east) / Buena Vista Avenue west	Northern end of US 25 Bus. concurrency; northern terminus of SC 125 and SC 125 Truck
1.000 mi = 1.609 km; 1.000 km = 0.621 mi: Concurrency terminus
