= Cheraw State Park =

State park in South Carolina, United States

- Location within South Carolina
- Interactive map of Cheraw State Park
- Nearest city: Cheraw, SC
- Coordinates: 34°38′51″N 79°53′39″W
- Area: 7,362 acres (30 km^{2})
- Created: 1934
- Camp sites: Regular campgrounds, equestrian, and RV sites are available all have access to restrooms and hot water showers. Backcountry camp sites are also available.
- Hiking trails: 4 miles (6 km)
- Other information: This park has a championship 18 hole golf course, 9 miles (14 km) of bicycle trails, 15 miles (24 km) of equestrian trails, canoe, kayak, and johnboat rentals.

Cheraw State Park is located in the northeast corner of the U.S. state of South Carolina. This large park is best known for its championship 18-hole golf course and the 300-acre (1.2 km^{2}) Lake Juniper, built by the Civilian Conservation Corps. Visitors can rent kayaks, canoes, and non-motorized joy boats to explore the lake, as well as fish for the catfish, bass, and bream found in the lake. Boats up to 9.9 hp are allowed in the lake. The park also has several cabins available for rent with views of the lake. There is no admission charge to Cheraw State Park.

== History ==
In 1934, the U.S. Government, as well local citizens, donated 7,361 acres (30 km^{2}) for the parks. In 1990, an additional 1.4 acres (5,700 m^{2}) was purchased from A. Wannamaker. Many buildings which are still in use at the park, as well as the 300-acre (1.2 km^{2}) lake, were built by the Civilian Conservation Corps. It is the oldest State Park in the South Carolina Park System and the largest originating from the CCC. Local citizens collected donations to form the first state park prior to the larger CCC project.

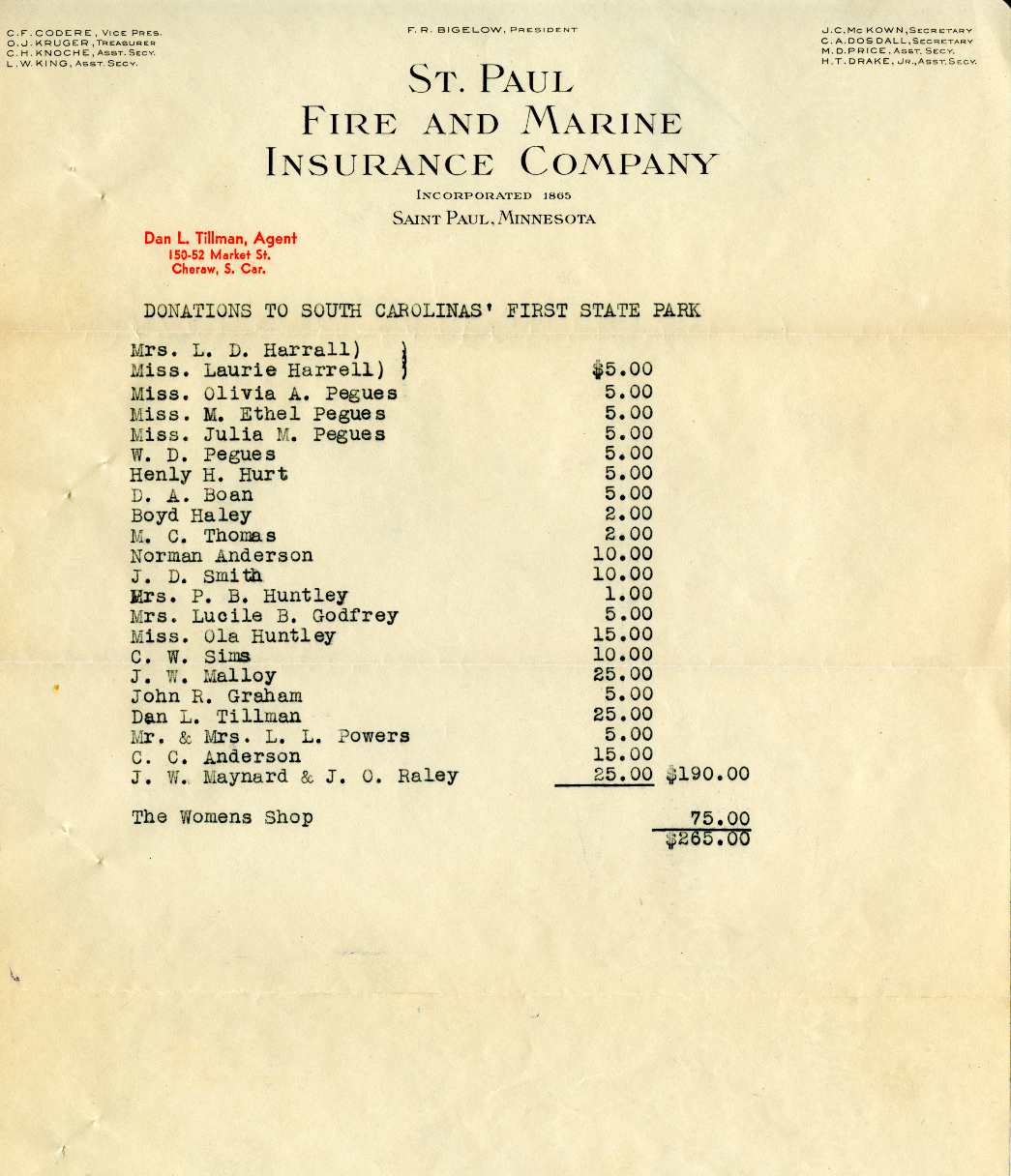
List of donors to first SC state park in Cheraw Sc.
