= Clearwater, South Carolina =

- Census-designated place
- Location within South Carolina Location within the United States
- Coordinates: 33°29′45″N 81°54′23″W
- Country: United States
- State: South Carolina
- County: Aiken
- Named for: Clearwater textile mill

Area
  - Total: 4.31 sq mi (11.17 km^{2})
  - Land: 4.19 sq mi (10.86 km^{2})
  - Water: 0.12 sq mi (0.31 km^{2})
- Elevation: 269 ft (82 m)

Population (2020)
  - Total: 4,079
  - Density: 972.9/sq mi (375.63/km^{2})
- Time zone: UTC-5 (Eastern (EST))
  - Summer (DST): UTC-4 (EDT)
- ZIP code: 29822
- Area codes: 803, 839
- FIPS code: 45-14860
- GNIS feature ID: 2402782

Clearwater is a census-designated place (CDP) in Aiken County, South Carolina. It lies near North Augusta, South Carolina, and is part of the Augusta, Georgia metropolitan area. Clearwater is located in historic Horse Creek Valley. The population was 4,370 at the time of the 2010 census.

== History ==
Clearwater was named after the Clearwater textile mill.

== Geography ==
Clearwater is located 5 miles (8 km) east of downtown Augusta, Georgia. It is partially bordered by North Augusta (to the north and to the southwest), and the town of Burnettown is on Clearwater's eastern border.

According to the United States Census Bureau, the CDP has a total area of 4.3 square miles (11.2 km^{2}), of which 4.2 square miles (10.8 km^{2}) is land and 0.12 square miles (0.3 km^{2}), or 2.82%, is water.

=== Highways ===
- I-520
- US 1
- US 78
- US 278
- SC 125
- SC 126
- SC 421

== Demographics ==
Historical population
Census	Pop.	Note	%±
2000	4,199		—
2010	4,370		4.1%
2020	4,079		−6.7%
U.S. Decennial Census

=== 2020 census ===
As of the 2020 census, there were 4,079 people, 1,651 households, and 981 families residing in the CDP. The median age was 38.9 years. 23.8% of residents were under the age of 18 and 18.6% of residents were 65 years of age or older. For every 100 females there were 91.5 males, and for every 100 females age 18 and over there were 87.8 males age 18 and over.

99.1% of residents lived in urban areas, while 0.9% lived in rural areas.

Of the 1,651 households in Clearwater, 30.7% had children under the age of 18 living in them. Of all households, 40.9% were married-couple households, 21.6% were households with a male householder and no spouse or partner present, and 30.8% were households with a female householder and no spouse or partner present. About 29.7% of all households were made up of individuals, and 12.1% had someone living alone who was 65 years of age or older.

There were 1,807 housing units, of which 8.6% were vacant. The homeowner vacancy rate was 1.3% and the rental vacancy rate was 5.3%.

Racial composition
Race	Num.	Perc.
White (non-Hispanic)	2,360	57.86%
Black or African American (non-Hispanic)	803	19.69%
Native American	22	0.54%
Asian	9	0.22%
Pacific Islander	2	0.05%
Other/Mixed	192	4.71%
Hispanic or Latino	691	16.94%

=== 2010 census ===
At the 2010 census, the total population was 4,370, of whom 0.64% were American Indian or Alaska native, 0.16% were Asian, 16.27% were African American, 0.05% were Native Hawaiian or other Pacific Islander, 69.61% were white, 11.33% were some other race, and 1.95% were of two or more races. Persons of Hispanic or Latino origin comprised 13.59% of the population. The male and female population was nearly balanced, with 49.84% and 50.16% of the total population, respectively.

8.17% of the population was under 5 years of age, 16.43% were age 5 to 17, 61.24% were age 18 to 64, and 14.16% were 65 years or older.

=== 2000 census ===
As of the census of 2000, there were 4,199 people, 1,717 households, and 1,174 families residing in the CDP. The population density was 983.8 inhabitants per square mile (379.8/km^{2}). There were 1,938 housing units at an average density of 454.1 per square mile (175.3/km^{2}). The racial makeup of the CDP was 79.92% White, 16.08% African American, 0.60% Native American, 0.33% Asian, 0.02% Pacific Islander, 1.67% from other races, and 1.38% from two or more races. Hispanic or Latino of any race were 3.74% of the population.

There were 1,717 households, out of which 29.9% had children under the age of 18 living with them, 48.7% were married couples living together, 15.6% had a female householder with no husband present, and 31.6% were non-families. 26.7% of all households were made up of individuals, and 9.6% had someone living alone who was 65 years of age or older. The average household size was 2.44 and the average family size was 2.94.

In the CDP, the population was spread out, with 24.8% under the age of 18, 8.8% from 18 to 24, 29.8% from 25 to 44, 23.2% from 45 to 64, and 13.3% who were 65 years of age or older. The median age was 36 years. For every 100 females, there were 92.7 males. For every 100 females age 18 and over, there were 91.2 males.

The median income for a household in the CDP was $30,693, and the median income for a family was $36,528. Males had a median income of $32,135 versus $21,020 for females. The per capita income for the CDP was $14,902. About 13.8% of families and 20.2% of the population were below the poverty line, including 28.4% of those under age 18 and 17.7% of those age 65 or over.

== Education ==
It is in the Aiken County Public School District. Zoned schools in most areas are Clearwater Elementary School, Langley-Bath-Clearwater (LBC) Middle School, and Midland Valley High School.
