= Belvedere, South Carolina =

- Census-designated place
- Interactive map of Belvedere, South Carolina
- Location within South Carolina Location within the United States
- Coordinates: 33°32′12″N 81°56′33″W
- Country: United States
- State: South Carolina
- County: Aiken

Area
  - Total: 3.43 sq mi (8.88 km^{2})
  - Land: 3.42 sq mi (8.87 km^{2})
  - Water: 0.0077 sq mi (0.02 km^{2})
- Elevation: 459 ft (140 m)

Population (2020)
  - Total: 5,380
  - Density: 1,571.7/sq mi (606.82/km^{2})
- Time zone: UTC-5 (Eastern (EST))
  - Summer (DST): UTC-4 (EDT)
- ZIP code: 29841
- Area codes: 803, 839
- FIPS code: 45-05410
- GNIS feature ID: 2402681

Belvedere is a census-designated place (CDP) and suburb of North Augusta in Aiken County, South Carolina, United States. It is part of the Augusta, Georgia metropolitan area. The population was 5,792 at the 2010 census.

Belvedere (from Italian, meaning "beautiful sight") was so named for its scenic river views over the Savannah River.

== Geography ==
Belvedere is located in western Aiken County. It is surrounded by the city of North Augusta, though Belvedere lies to the northeast of the original city center. U.S. Route 25 (Edgefield Road) is the main road through the community, leading north to Interstate 20 just outside the CDP. Interstate 520 passes just to the east of the CDP.

According to the United States Census Bureau, the CDP has a total area of 3.5 square miles (9.1 km^{2}), of which 0.008 square miles (0.02 km^{2}), or 0.17%, is water.

=== Highways ===
- I-520
- US 25
- SC 126

== Demographics ==
Historical population
Census	Pop.	Note	%±
2000	5,631		—
2010	5,792		2.9%
2020	5,380		−7.1%
U.S. Decennial Census

=== 2000 Census ===
As of the census of 2000, there were 5,631 people, 2,245 households, and 1,567 families residing in the CDP. The population density was 1,436.5 inhabitants per square mile (554.6/km^{2}). There were 2,430 housing units at an average density of 619.9 per square mile (239.3/km^{2}). The racial makeup of the CDP was 74.39% White, 23.64% African American, 0.09% Native American, 0.39% Asian, 0.04% Pacific Islander, 0.52% from other races, and 0.94% from two or more races. Hispanic or Latino of any race were 1.81% of the population.

There were 2,245 households, out of which 32.0% had children under the age of 18 living with them, 52.9% were married couples living together, 13.4% had a female householder with no husband present, and 30.2% were non-families. 26.5% of all households were made up of individuals, and 10.5% had someone living alone who was 65 years of age or older. The average household size was 2.51 and the average family size was 3.02.

In the CDP, the population was spread out, with 25.4% under the age of 18, 8.8% from 18 to 24, 30.0% from 25 to 44, 22.9% from 45 to 64, and 12.8% who were 65 years of age or older. The median age was 36 years. For every 100 females, there were 91.9 males. For every 100 females age 18 and over, there were 88.3 males.

The median income for a household in the CDP was $36,045, and the median income for a family was $40,264. Males had a median income of $31,768 versus $21,374 for females. The per capita income for the CDP was $16,336. About 11.0% of families and 12.0% of the population were below the poverty line, including 15.3% of those under age 18 and 5.4% of those age 65 or over.

=== 2010 Census ===
At the 2010 census, the total population was 5,792, of whom 0.31% were American Indian or Alaska native, 0.41% were Asian, 26.23% were African American, 0.05% were Native Hawaiian or other Pacific Islander, 66.80% were white, 3.63% were some other race, and 2.57% were of two or more races. People of Hispanic or Latino origin of any race made up 5.96% of the population. Males comprised 48.46%, and females 51.54% of the population.

Persons under the age of 5 were 7.63% of the population, persons age 5 to 17 were 17.37%, age 18 to 64 were 60.01%, and age 65 and over were 14.99% of the population.

=== 2020 Census ===
Belvedere racial composition
Race	Num.	Perc.
White (non-Hispanic)	3,066	56.99%
Black or African American (non-Hispanic)	1,410	26.21%
Native American	12	0.22%
Asian	25	0.46%
Pacific Islander	4	0.07%
Other/Mixed	282	5.24%
Hispanic or Latino	581	10.8%

As of the 2020 United States census, there were 5,380 people, 2,251 households, and 1,452 families residing in the CDP.

== Education ==
It is in the Aiken County Public School District.

The CDP is divided between Belvedere Elementary School and North Augusta Middle School, and Mossy Creek Elementary School and Paul Knox Middle School. All areas of the CDP are zoned to North Augusta High School.
