= Aiken County, South Carolina =

County in South Carolina, United States

- County
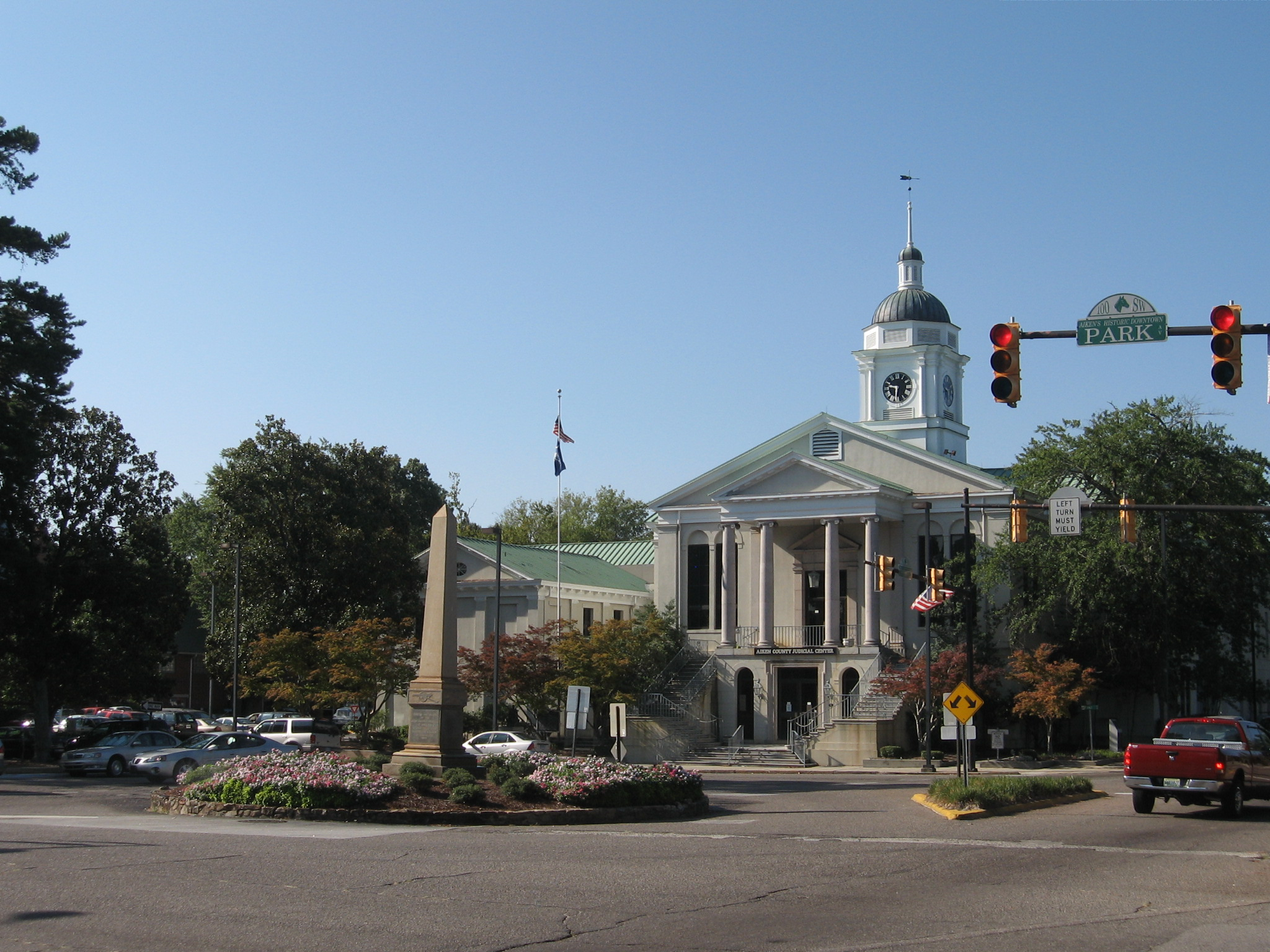
- Aiken County Courthouse and Confederate Monument

- Seal

- Location within the U.S. state of South Carolina
- Interactive map of Aiken County, South Carolina
- Coordinates: 33.55°N 81.63°W
- Country: United States
- State: South Carolina
- Founded: 1871; 155 years ago
- Named for: William Aiken
- Seat: Aiken
- Largest community: Aiken

Area
  - Total: 1,080.17 sq mi (2,797.6 km^{2})
  - Land: 1,070.69 sq mi (2,773.1 km^{2})
  - Water: 9.48 sq mi (24.6 km^{2}) 0.88%

Population (2020)
  - Total: 168,808
  - Estimate (2025): 181,515 ▲
  - Density: 157.663/sq mi (60.8740/km^{2})
- Time zone: UTC−5 (Eastern)
  - Summer (DST): UTC−4 (EDT)
- Congressional district: 2nd
- Website: www.aikencountysc.gov

Aiken County (/ˈeɪkən/) is a county in the U.S. state of South Carolina. As of the 2020 census, its population was 168,808. Its county seat and largest community is Aiken. Aiken County is a part of the Augusta-Richmond County, Georgia-South Carolina metropolitan statistical area. It is mostly in the Sandhills region, with the northern parts reaching in the Piedmont and southern parts reaching into the Coastal Plain.

== History ==
In the colonial era, the area that is now Aiken County was part of Edgefield and Orangeburgh Districts. Most of the population were immigrant farmers, many from the rural parts of Lincolnshire, England, but very few were from the town of Lincoln. Virtually all of the farmers from Lincolnshire came to the colony as indentured servants in the 1730s and 1740s. By the 1750s, though, almost all of them were living on their own private land, almost exclusively engaging in subsistence agriculture on smallholding farms. Many immigrants also came from the rural eastern half of the English county of Nottinghamshire. Specifically, many indentured servants came from the towns of Newark-on-Trent, Winthorpe, Coddington, Balderton, Kelham, and Farndon. A third group of English farmers settled in the colony, mostly arriving not as individual indentured servants, but as entire family units, coming from the Derbyshire Dales region of the English county of Derbyshire; these settlers primarily originated in the three towns of Ashbourne, Bakewell, and Matlock, as well as the farm country surrounding these towns. These settlers also settled on lands between the Savannah River in the west and the towns of Berlin and Jones Crossroads in the east, all arriving in what has since become Aiken County in the 1740s. A numerically smaller but influential migration came to what has since become Aiken County in the form of Presbyterian immigrants of Scottish ancestry who came from County Antrim and the northern portion of County Down in Ireland, as well as small numbers from the town of Kesh in County Fermanagh, Ireland. This population referred to themselves as "Ulstermen" and "Irish Presbyterians", but were known in the colonies as "Scots-Irish" settlers, though this was not a term they self-applied. They, too, arrived in the 1740s. The area that has since become Aiken County had a significantly high number of first-generation British immigrants who fought for the Patriot cause in the Revolutionary War.

Both Aiken County and its county seat of Aiken are named after William Aiken (1779–1831), the first president of the South Carolina Railroad Company. Aiken County was organized during the Reconstruction era in 1871 from portions of Barnwell, Edgefield, Lexington, and Orangeburg counties.

Prince Rivers, a freedman and state legislator from Edgefield County, had been a leader in the United States Colored Troops. He was named to head the commission that drew the new county's boundary lines. He was dubbed "the Black Prince" by local newspapers, including the Edgefield Advertiser. He also led the commission that selected the site of Aiken County's present-day courthouse. Other freedmen who were part of the founding of the county were Samuel J. Lee, speaker of the state House and the first black man admitted to the South Carolina Bar; and Charles D. Hayne, a free man of color from one of Charleston's elite families.

Political tensions kept rising in South Carolina during the 1870s, especially around elections. In the months before the 1876 elections, Aiken County was one of the areas to suffer white paramilitary Red Shirts attacks and violence directed against black Republicans to suppress the black vote. Between the Hamburg Massacre in July and several days of rioting in September in Ellenton, more than 100 black men were killed by white paramilitary groups in this county. Two white men died in the violence.

In the late 19th century, the county became a popular winter refuge for affluent Northerners, who built luxury housing. The county remains popular with horse trainers and professional riders because mild winters allow lengthy training seasons.

In the 1950s, Aiken County (along with the nearby counties of Allendale and Barnwell) was chosen as the location for storage and production of nuclear materials and various fissile materials, now known as the Savannah River Site. Ellenton, South Carolina was acquired and its buildings demolished for its development of this plant. Its residents and businesses were moved north about eight miles to New Ellenton, and about 5 miles south to the town of Jackson just outside the entrance to the Savannah River Site, Developed during Cold War tensions, the facility is scheduled for decommissioning of various parts of the site.

== Geography ==
According to the U.S. Census Bureau, the county has a total area of 1,080.17 square miles (2,797.6 km^{2}), of which 9.48 square miles (24.6 km^{2}) (0.88%) are covered by water. It is the fourth-largest county in South Carolina by land area.

=== State and local protected areas/sites ===
- Aiken Gopher Tortoise Heritage Preserve/Wildlife Management Area
- Aiken State Park
- Audubon's Silver Bluff Center and Sanctuary
- Britton Mims Place
- Battle of Aiken
- Bear Branch Heritage Preserve
- Crackerneck Wildlife Management Area and Ecological Reserve
- Ditch Pond Heritage Preserve/Wildlife Management Area
- Gopher Branch Heritage Preserve
- Graniteville Historic District
- Henderson Heritage Preserve/Wildlife Management Area
- Janet Harrison High Pond Heritage Preserve
- Redcliffe Plantation State Historic Site
- Vaucluse Mill Village Historic District

=== Major water bodies ===
- Bridge Creek
- North Fork Edisto River
- South Fork Edisto River
- Savannah River
- Shaw Creek

=== Adjacent counties ===
- Saluda County – north
- Lexington County – northeast
- Orangeburg County – east
- Barnwell County – south
- Burke County, Georgia – southwest
- Edgefield County – west
- Richmond County, Georgia – west

=== Major highways ===
- I-20
- I-520
- US 1
  - US 1 Truck (Aiken)
- US 25
  - US 25 Bus. (North Augusta)
  - US 25 Conn. (North Augusta)
- US 78
  - US 78 Truck (Aiken)
- US 278
- SC 4
  - SC 4 Truck (Aiken–Kitchings Mill)
- SC 5
- SC 19
  - SC 19 Conn. (Aiken)
  - SC 19 Truck (Aiken)
- SC 34
- SC 39
  - SC 39 Conn. (Jones Crossroads)
- SC 73
- SC 121
- SC 125
  - SC 125 Conn. (North Augusta)
  - SC 125 Truck (North Augusta)
- SC 191
- SC 230
- SC 302
- SC 394

=== Major infrastructure ===
- Aiken Regional Airport
- Savannah River Site (part)

== Demographics ==
Historical population
Census	Pop.	Note	%±
1880	28,112		—
1890	31,822		13.2%
1900	39,032		22.7%
1910	41,849		7.2%
1920	45,574		8.9%
1930	47,403		4.0%
1940	49,916		5.3%
1950	53,137		6.5%
1960	81,038		52.5%
1970	91,023		12.3%
1980	105,625		16.0%
1990	120,940		14.5%
2000	142,552		17.9%
2010	160,099		12.3%
2020	168,808		5.4%
2025 (est.)	181,515	▲	7.5%
U.S. Decennial Census; 1790–1960 1900–1990; 1990–2000 2010 2020

=== Racial and ethnic composition ===
Aiken County, South Carolina – Racial and ethnic composition Note: the US Census treats Hispanic/Latino as an ethnic category. This table excludes Latinos from the racial categories and assigns them to a separate category. Hispanics/Latinos may be of any race.
Race / Ethnicity (NH = Non-Hispanic)	Pop 1980	Pop 1990	Pop 2000	Pop 2010	Pop 2020	% 1980	% 1990	% 2000	% 2010	% 2020
White alone (NH)	78,572	90,130	100,329	108,566	107,918	74.39%	74.52%	70.38%	67.81%	63.93%
Black or African American alone (NH)	25,858	29,176	36,254	39,043	39,465	24.48%	24.12%	25.43%	24.39%	23.38%
Native American or Alaska Native alone (NH)	117	213	525	589	530	0.11%	0.18%	0.37%	0.37%	0.31%
Asian alone (NH)	209	528	896	1,318	1,773	0.20%	0.44%	0.63%	0.82%	1.05%
Native Hawaiian or Pacific Islander alone (NH)	x	x	28	52	96	x	x	0.02%	0.03%	0.06%
Other race alone (NH)	134	26	95	199	669	0.13%	0.02%	0.07%	0.12%	0.40%
Mixed race or Multiracial (NH)	x	x	1,400	2,508	6,831	x	x	0.98%	1.57%	4.05%
Hispanic or Latino (any race)	735	867	3,025	7,824	11,526	0.70%	0.72%	2.12%	4.89%	6.83%
Total	105,625	120,940	142,552	160,099	168,808	100.00%	100.00%	100.00%	100.00%	100.00%

=== 2020 census ===
As of the 2020 census, there were 168,808 people in 69,450 households, including 43,932 families residing in the county. The median age was 42.3 years; 21.3% of residents were under the age of 18 and 20.9% of residents were 65 years of age or older. For every 100 females there were 91.9 males, and for every 100 females age 18 and over there were 88.8 males age 18 and over.

The racial makeup of the county was 65.2% White, 23.6% Black or African American, 0.4% American Indian and Alaska Native, 1.1% Asian, 0.1% Native Hawaiian and Pacific Islander, 3.4% from some other race, and 6.2% from two or more races. Hispanic or Latino residents of any race comprised 6.8% of the population.

63.0% of residents lived in urban areas, while 37.0% lived in rural areas.

There were 69,450 households in the county, of which 27.6% had children under the age of 18 living with them and 29.8% had a female householder with no spouse or partner present. About 28.9% of all households were made up of individuals and 12.4% had someone living alone who was 65 years of age or older.

There were 76,923 housing units, of which 9.7% were vacant. Among occupied housing units, 73.2% were owner-occupied and 26.8% were renter-occupied. The homeowner vacancy rate was 1.5% and the rental vacancy rate was 8.1%.

=== 2010 census ===
At the 2010 census, there were 160,099 people, 64,253 households, and 43,931 families living in the county. The population density was 149.5 inhabitants per square mile (57.7/km^{2}). There were 72,249 housing units at an average density of 67.5 per square mile (26.1/km^{2}). The racial makeup of the county was 69.6% white, 24.6% black or African American, 0.8% Asian, 0.4% American Indian, 2.6% from other races, and 1.9% from two or more races. Those of Hispanic or Latino origin made up 4.9% of the population. In terms of ancestry, 20.6% were American, 10.0% were English, 9.9% were German, and 8.6% were Irish.

Of the 64,253 households, 31.4% had children under the age of 18 living with them, 49.3% were married couples living together, 14.4% had a female householder with no husband present, 31.6% were non-families, and 26.9% of all households were made up of individuals. The average household size was 2.45 and the average family size was 2.96. The median age was 40.0 years.

The median income for a household in the county was $44,468 and the median income for a family was $57,064. Males had a median income of $44,436 versus $33,207 for females. The per capita income for the county was $24,172. About 13.4% of families and 16.6% of the population were below the poverty line, including 23.7% of those under age 18 and 13.3% of those age 65 or over.

The following is from the 2010 Census Total Population : 160,099 (100.00%)

Population by Race American Indian and Alaska native alone 682 (0.43%) Asian alone 1,329 (0.83%) Black or African American alone 39,354 (24.58%) Native Hawaiian and Other Pacific native alone 61 (0.04%) Some other race alone 4,126 (2.58%) Two or more races 3,090 (1.93%) White alone 111,457 (69.62%)

Population by Hispanic or Latino Origin (of any race) Persons Not of Hispanic or Latino Origin 152,275 (95.11%) Persons of Hispanic or Latino Origin 7,824 (4.89%)

Population by Gender Female 82,549 (51.56%) Male 77,550 (48.44%)

Population by Age Persons 0 to 4 years 10,046 (6.27%) Persons 5 to 17 years 26,782 (16.73%) Persons 18 to 64 years (98,652) 61.62% Persons 65 years and over 24,619 (15.38%)

=== 2000 census ===
At the 2000 census, there were 142,552 people, 55,587 households, and 39,411 families living in the county. The population density was 133 inhabitants per square mile (51/km^{2}). There were 61,987 housing units at an average density of 58 per square mile (22/km^{2}). The racial makeup of the county was 71.37% White, 25.56% Black or African American, 0.40% Native American, 0.63% Asian, 0.03% Pacific Islander, and 1.18% from two or more races. 2.12% of the population were Hispanic or Latino of any race. 22.0% were of American, 9.7% English, 8.4% German and 7.9% Irish ancestry according to Census 2000.

There were 55,587 households, out of which 33.10% had children under the age of 18 living with them, 53.30% were married couples living together, 13.80% had a female householder with no husband present, and 29.10% were non-families. 25.20% of all households were made up of individuals, and 9.20% had someone living alone who was 65 years of age or older. The average household size was 2.53 and the average family size was 3.03.

In the county, the population was spread out, with 26.20% under the age of 18, 8.80% from 18 to 24, 28.90% from 25 to 44, 23.30% from 45 to 64, and 12.80% who were 65 years of age or older. The median age was 36 years. For every 100 females, there were 92.90 males. For every 100 females age 18 and over, there were 89.20 males.

The median income for a household in the county was $37,889, and the median income for a family was $45,769. Males had a median income of $36,743 versus $23,810 for females. The per capita income for the county was $18,772. About 10.60% of families and 13.80% of the population were below the poverty line, including 18.90% of those under age 18 and 12.50% of those age 65 or over.

== Law and government ==
Gary Bunker is the Chairman of the Aiken County Council. The other members and their districts are as follows:

- Kathy Rawls – district 1
- Camille Furgiuele – district 2
- Danny Feagin – district 3
- Chuck Smith – district 4
- Sandy Haskell – district 5
- Phil Napier – district 6
- Andrew Siders – district 7
- Willar H. Hightower Jr. – district 8
- Marty Sawyer – Aiken County Sheriff

=== Politics ===
Aiken County was one of the first counties in South Carolina to break away from a "Solid South" voting pattern. It has gone Republican in every presidential election since 1956. It even rejected southern Democrats such as Lyndon Johnson of Texas, Jimmy Carter of Georgia, Bill Clinton of Arkansas and Al Gore of Tennessee. Carter is the last Democrat to manage even 40 percent of the county's vote. However, it has trended more liberal in recent years, giving Bob Dole in 1996 a greater proportion of the vote than Donald Trump in 2016, despite Dole losing decisively to Bill Clinton nationally, and Donald Trump winning the Electoral College 304-227.

The Republican trend runs through the local level as well. While conservative Democrats held most state and local offices well into the 1990s, today there are almost no elected Democrats left above the county level.

United States presidential election results for Aiken County, South Carolina
Year	Republican		Democratic		Third party(ies)	
Year	No.	%	No.	%	No.	%
1892	396	17.46%	1,802	79.45%	70	3.09%
1896	137	6.96%	1,819	92.48%	11	0.56%
1900	53	3.48%	1,470	96.52%	0	0.00%
1904	35	2.05%	1,672	97.95%	0	0.00%
1908	48	2.36%	1,990	97.64%	0	0.00%
1912	2	0.14%	1,452	99.59%	4	0.27%
1916	26	1.45%	1,750	97.93%	11	0.62%
1920	64	3.74%	1,649	96.26%	0	0.00%
1924	16	1.06%	1,488	98.61%	5	0.33%
1928	242	15.58%	1,308	84.22%	3	0.19%
1932	47	1.39%	3,346	98.61%	0	0.00%
1936	35	1.05%	3,298	98.95%	0	0.00%
1940	89	3.11%	2,772	96.89%	0	0.00%
1944	60	2.28%	2,403	91.26%	170	6.46%
1948	115	2.17%	572	10.79%	4,612	87.04%
1952	4,282	49.63%	4,346	50.37%	0	0.00%
1956	6,195	50.38%	4,280	34.81%	1,821	14.81%
1960	10,715	61.62%	6,674	38.38%	0	0.00%
1964	17,467	69.62%	7,622	30.38%	0	0.00%
1968	12,264	44.76%	6,319	23.06%	8,815	32.17%
1972	21,117	77.05%	5,745	20.96%	545	1.99%
1976	16,011	51.36%	14,927	47.88%	235	0.75%
1980	18,570	57.37%	13,014	40.21%	785	2.43%
1984	25,872	71.60%	9,892	27.38%	369	1.02%
1988	27,665	71.84%	10,598	27.52%	244	0.63%
1992	25,731	55.01%	14,802	31.64%	6,245	13.35%
1996	26,539	61.61%	14,314	33.23%	2,221	5.16%
2000	33,203	65.38%	16,409	32.31%	1,170	2.30%
2004	39,077	65.68%	19,799	33.28%	616	1.04%
2008	42,849	61.41%	26,101	37.41%	820	1.18%
2012	44,042	62.59%	25,322	35.99%	999	1.42%
2016	46,025	61.49%	25,455	34.01%	3,371	4.50%
2020	51,589	60.56%	32,275	37.89%	1,321	1.55%
2024	53,592	62.25%	31,298	36.35%	1,201	1.40%

== Economy ==
In 2022, the GDP of Aiken County was $8.6 billion (approx. $48,344 per capita). In chained 2017 dollars, its real GDP was $7.1 billion (approx. $42,060 per capita). Between 2021 and 2024, the unemployment rate has fluctuated around 3%. As of April 2024, some of the largest employers in the county include Aiken Regional Medical Center, Bridgestone, Hubbell Incorporated, Kimberly-Clark, Savanah River Nuclear Solutions (SRNS), Shaw Industries, UPS, and Walmart.

Employment and Wage Statistics by Industry in Aiken County, South Carolina
Industry	Employment Counts	Employment Percentage (%)	Average Annual Wage ($)
Accommodation and Food Services	6,332	9.9	19,136
Administrative and Support and Waste Management and Remediation Services	9,749	15.2	87,516
Agriculture, Forestry, Fishing and Hunting	246	0.4	53,404
Arts, Entertainment, and Recreation	1,115	1.7	21,424
Construction	5,781	9.0	82,316
Educational Services	4,313	6.7	52,572
Finance and Insurance	1,011	1.6	67,808
Health Care and Social Assistance	7,217	11.2	49,972
Information	458	0.7	62,400
Management of Companies and Enterprises	114	0.2	92,612
Manufacturing	8,739	13.6	71,448
Mining, Quarrying, and Oil and Gas Extraction	138	0.2	73,684
Other Services (except Public Administration)	1,693	2.6	46,436
Professional, Scientific, and Technical Services	3,388	5.3	102,908
Public Administration	2,564	4.0	63,024
Real Estate and Rental and Leasing	462	0.7	48,984
Retail Trade	7,320	11.4	31,824
Transportation and Warehousing	2,417	3.8	52,260
Utilities	374	0.6	86,372
Wholesale Trade	825	1.3	60,060
Total	64,256	100.0%	60,220

== Education ==
The only school district covering sections of the county is Aiken County School District, which covers the majority of the county. A portion of the county is not in any school district, and the 2010 U.S. census stated that this portion was in "School District Not Defined". That undefined portion corresponds with the Savannah River Site.

Aiken Technical College and University of South Carolina Aiken are located in Aiken County.

== Communities ==
=== Cities ===
- Aiken (county seat and largest community)
- New Ellenton
- North Augusta (partly in Edgefield County)

=== Towns ===
- Burnettown
- Jackson
- Perry
- Salley
- Monetta (partly in Saluda County)
- Wagener
- Windsor

=== Census-designated places ===
- Beech Island
- Belvedere
- Clearwater
- Gloverville
- Graniteville
- Langley
- Warrenville

=== Unincorporated communities ===
- Bath
- Eureka
- New Holland
- Seivern
- Spiderweb
- Talatha
- White Pond
- Vaucluse

== Historic places ==
- Aiken Tennis Club
- Hamburg
- Whitehall
- Palmetto Golf Club
- Whitney Field, Polo, Oldest in United States
- Hitchcock Woods

== See also ==
- List of counties in South Carolina
- National Register of Historic Places listings in Aiken County, South Carolina
- Horse Creek Valley
- Beaver Creek Indian Tribe, state-recognized tribe that resides in the county
