= Midland Valley (South Carolina) =

Coordinates: 33.551526°N 81.8209446°W

The Midland Valley area is a region in Aiken County, South Carolina consisting of the unincorporated communities of Gloverville, Graniteville, Langley, Vaucluse, Warrenville, Graniteville, Bath, as well as the incorporated town of Burnettown

The area is more formally known as the Horse Creek Valley, a large stream in the Savannah River watershed which carved the large valley in the Sandhills.
