= South Carolina Highway 191 =

Highway in South Carolina

South Carolina Highway 191

Route information
- Maintained by SCDOT
- Length: 21.930 mi (35.293 km)

Major junctions
- South end: SC 421 in Warrenville
- US 1 / US 78 in Graniteville
- North end: SC 121 in Johnston

Location
- Country: United States
- State: South Carolina
- Counties: Aiken, Edgefield

Highway system
- South Carolina State Highway System; Interstate; US; State; Scenic
← SC 188	→ SC 193

South Carolina Highway 191 (SC 191) is a 21.930-mile-long (35.293 km) state highway in the U.S. state of South Carolina. The highway connects Warrenville and Johnston.

== Route description ==
SC 191 begins at an intersection with SC 421 (Augusta Road) on the border of two Aiken County census designated places: Warrenville and Gloverville. From this intersection, the roadway continues as Howlandville Road. SC 191 travels to the north-northwest and immediately crosses over a railroad track and the Sand River, and has an interchange with U.S. Route 1 (US 1) and US 78 (Jefferson Davis Highway) on the border of Warrenville and Graniteville. It travels to the north-northeast and crosses over the site of the Graniteville, South Carolina, train crash, in which nine people died when two trains collided in 2005. It passes the Leavelle McCampbell Middle School. SC 191 turns left onto Old Graniteville Highway and immediately crosses over the Graniteville Canal. A short distance later is a crossing of Bridge Creek. The highway parallels Flat Rock Pond and Horse Creek. In Vaucluse, the highway crosses over Good Spring Branch. Then, it passes a U.S. Post Office branch on the southeastern edge of Vaucluse Pond. It curves to the northeast and travels underneath, but does not have an interchange with Interstate 20. In a rural part of the county, it intersects SC 19 (Edgefield Highway).

The two highways travel concurrently to the north-northwest. They split in Eureka. SC 191 crosses over Shaw Creek. Then, it curves to the north-northwest and enters Edgefield County. The highway continues traveling through rural areas and crosses over Hall Branch before it meets its northern terminus, an intersection with SC 121, in the extreme southern part of Johnston.

== Major intersections ==
County	Location	mi	km	Destinations	Notes
Aiken	Warrenville–Gloverville line	0.000	0.000	SC 421 (Augusta Road) / Howlandville Road	
Aiken	Graniteville–Warrenville line	0.290	0.467	US 1 / US 78 (Jefferson Davis Highway) / Brantley Road	Interchange; access to and from US 1 south / US 78 west via Brantley Road
Aiken		8.600	13.840	SC 19 south (Edgefield Highway) / Shiloh Church Road – Aiken	Southern end of SC 19 concurrency
Aiken	Eureka	11.720	18.862	SC 19 north (Edgefield Highway) – Edgefield	Northern end of SC 19 concurrency
Edgefield	Johnston	21.930	35.293	SC 121 (Lee Street) / Aiken Avenue – Trenton, Johnston	
1.000 mi = 1.609 km; 1.000 km = 0.621 mi: Concurrency terminus
