= Gloverville, South Carolina =

- Census-designated place
- Gloverville Post Office

- Location within South Carolina Location within the United States
- Coordinates: 33°31′38″N 81°48′52″W
- Country: United States
- State: South Carolina
- County: Aiken

Area
  - Total: 3.64 sq mi (9.42 km^{2})
  - Land: 3.63 sq mi (9.40 km^{2})
  - Water: 0.0077 sq mi (0.02 km^{2})
- Elevation: 348 ft (106 m)

Population (2020)
  - Total: 2,406
  - Density: 663.1/sq mi (256.02/km^{2})
- Time zone: UTC-5 (Eastern (EST))
  - Summer (DST): UTC-4 (EDT)
- ZIP code: 29828
- Area codes: 803, 839
- FIPS code: 45-29410
- GNIS feature ID: 2402530

Gloverville is a census-designated place (CDP) in Aiken County, South Carolina, United States. The population was 2,831 at the 2010 census. It is part of the Augusta, Georgia metropolitan area. Gloverville is located in historic Horse Creek Valley.

== Geography ==
Gloverville is located in western Aiken County. Neighboring communities are Langley to the southwest, part of Burnettown to the northwest, Graniteville to the north, and Warrenville to the east. Gloverville is located 9 miles (14 km) east of downtown Augusta, Georgia, and 8 miles (13 km) southwest of downtown Aiken.

According to the United States Census Bureau, the Gloverville CDP has a total area of 3.6 square miles (9.4 km^{2}), of which 0.0077 square miles (0.02 km^{2}), or 0.25%, is water.

== Demographics ==
Historical population
Census	Pop.	Note	%±
2000	2,805		—
2010	2,831		0.9%
2020	2,406		−15.0%
U.S. Decennial Census

=== 2000 census ===
As of the census of 2000, there were 2,805 people, 1,142 households, and 771 families residing in the CDP. The population density was 801.6 inhabitants per square mile (309.5/km^{2}). There were 1,324 housing units at an average density of 378.4 per square mile (146.1/km^{2}). The racial makeup of the CDP was 86.27% White, 10.91% African American, 0.32% Native American, 0.11% Asian, 0.36% from other races, and 2.03% from two or more races. Hispanic or Latino of any race were 1.21% of the population.

There were 1,142 households, out of which 31.9% had children under the age of 18 living with them, 46.8% were married couples living together, 16.4% had a female householder with no husband present, and 32.4% were non-families. 28.2% of all households were made up of individuals, and 10.6% had someone living alone who was 65 years of age or older. The average household size was 2.45 and the average family size was 2.99.

In the CDP, the population was spread out, with 26.9% under the age of 18, 10.2% from 18 to 24, 28.4% from 25 to 44, 23.4% from 45 to 64, and 11.1% who were 65 years of age or older. The median age was 34 years. For every 100 females, there were 94.4 males. For every 100 females age 18 and over, there were 90.4 males.

The median income for a household in the CDP was $24,679, and the median income for a family was $31,719. Males had a median income of $29,088 versus $18,143 for females. The per capita income for the CDP was $13,314. About 18.0% of families and 22.5% of the population were below the poverty line, including 29.6% of those under age 18 and 19.5% of those age 65 or over.

=== 2010 census ===
As of 2010, the census reported a population of 2,831. Of this, 2,290 were White, (80.89%) 382 (13.49%) were Black or African American, 86 (3.04%) were two or more races, 46 (1.62%) were some other race, 21 (0.74%) were American Indian or Alaska Native 6 (0.21%) were Asian.

=== 2020 census ===
Gloverville racial composition
Race	Num.	Perc.
White (non-Hispanic)	1,701	70.7%
Black or African American (non-Hispanic)	403	16.75%
Native American	17	0.71%
Asian	4	0.17%
Other/Mixed	130	5.4%
Hispanic or Latino	151	6.28%

As of the 2020 United States census, there were 2,406 people, 1,119 households, and 686 families residing in the CDP.

== Education ==
It is in the Aiken County Public School District.

Zoned schools in most areas are Gloverville Elementary School and Leavelle McCampbell Middle School, while some areas in the CDP to the west are zoned to Jefferson Elementary School and Langley-Bath-Clearwater (LBC) Middle School, and some areas to the east are zoned to Warrenville Elementary School and LBC Middle School. All areas in the CDP are zoned to Midland Valley High School.
