= Burnettown, South Carolina =

- Town
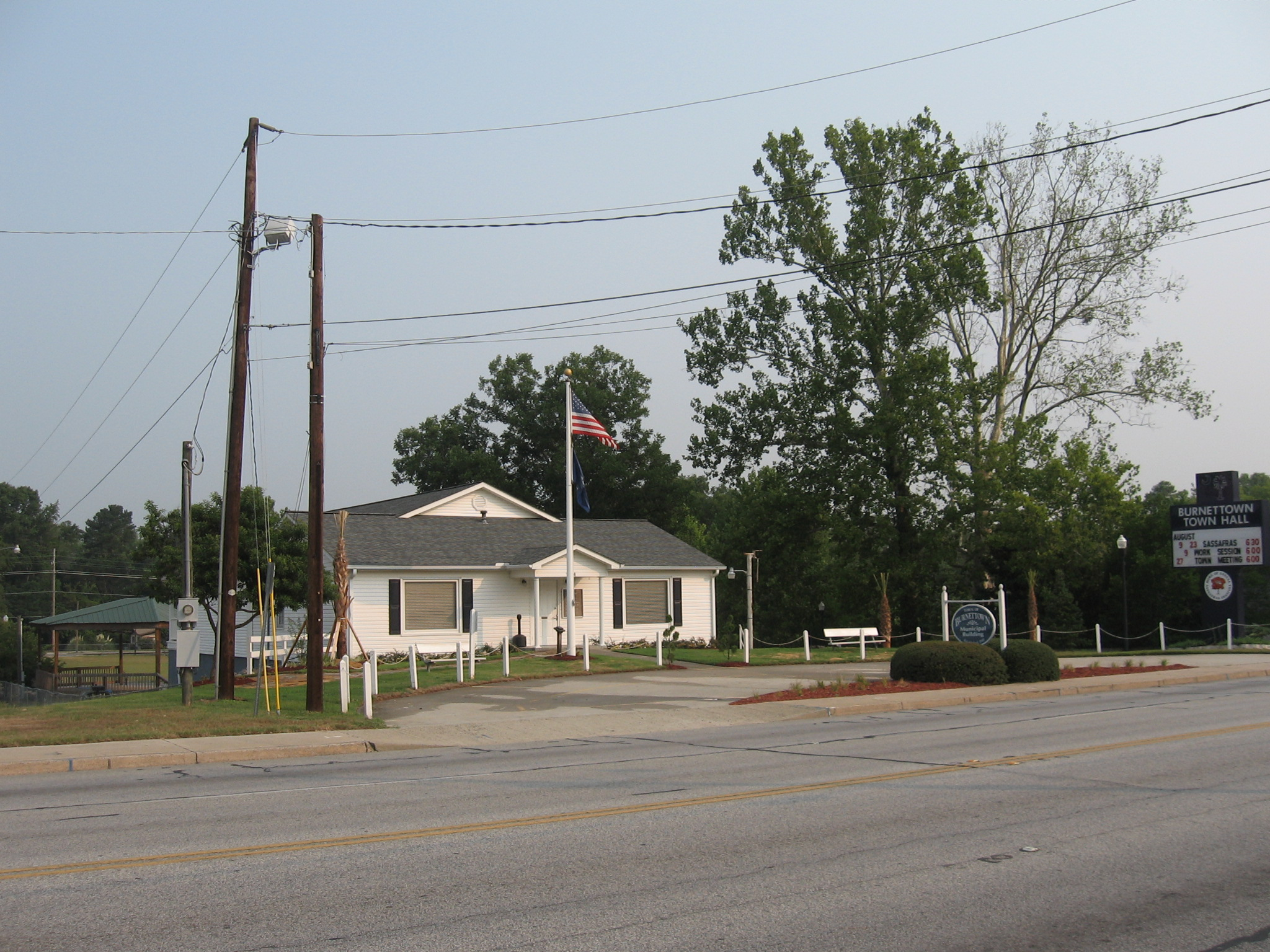
- Former Burnettown Town Hall

- Location within South Carolina Location within the United States
- Coordinates: 33°30′44″N 81°52′14″W
- Country: United States
- State: South Carolina
- County: Aiken
- Incorporated: June 5, 1941; 85 years ago
- Named for: Daniel Burnette

Government
  - Mayor: Karen Jones

Area
  - Total: 6.05 sq mi (15.67 km^{2})
  - Land: 5.51 sq mi (14.27 km^{2})
  - Water: 0.54 sq mi (1.40 km^{2})
- Elevation: 226 ft (69 m)

Population (2020)
  - Total: 3,105
  - Density: 563.6/sq mi (217.59/km^{2})
- Time zone: UTC-5 (Eastern (EST))
  - Summer (DST): UTC-4 (EDT)
- ZIP code: 29851
- Area codes: 803, 839
- FIPS code: 45-10270
- GNIS feature ID: 2405347
- Website: www.burnettown.com

Burnettown is a town in Aiken County, South Carolina, United States. The population was 3,105 at the 2020 census. It is part of the Augusta, Georgia metropolitan area. Burnettown is located in historic Horse Creek Valley.

== History ==
In 1890, Daniel Burnette purchased the land of what is now Burnettown on the side of a route between Augusta, Georgia, and Aiken, South Carolina. By 1901, Burnette had sold some lots to home builders.

From 1902 to 1929, the Aiken-Augusta Interurban Trolley Line ran through the valley. The area was referred to as “Mr. Burnette’s Land” by passengers wishing to make a stop.

On June 5, 1941, a charter was granted to incorporate Burnettown. At the time, it was the largest tract of land that a mill in the area did not own.

== Geography ==
Burnettown is located in western Aiken County. It lies along U.S. Route 1 and 78, 7 miles (11 km) east of downtown Augusta, Georgia, and 10 miles (16 km) west of Aiken. It is bordered by the census-designated place (CDP) of Clearwater to the west, by an outer portion of the city of North Augusta to the northwest, by the CDPs of Gloverville and Langley to the east, and by the unincorporated community of Bath to the south.

According to the United States Census Bureau, the town has a total area of 6.0 square miles (15.6 km^{2}), of which 5.5 square miles (14.2 km^{2}) is land and 0.54 square miles (1.4 km^{2}), or 9.17%, is water, consisting primarily of Langley Pond, a reservoir on Horse Creek.

== Demographics ==
Historical population
Census	Pop.	Note	%±
1950	578		—
1960	510		−11.8%
1970	434		−14.9%
1980	359		−17.3%
1990	493		37.3%
2000	2,720		451.7%
2010	2,673		−1.7%
2020	3,105		16.2%
U.S. Decennial Census

=== 2020 census ===
As of the 2020 census, there were 3,105 people residing in the town. There were 1,174 households and 734 families.

The median age was 39.1 years. 23.7% of residents were under the age of 18 and 16.5% were 65 years of age or older. For every 100 females there were 98.5 males, and for every 100 females age 18 and over there were 93.1 males age 18 and over.

97.6% of residents lived in urban areas, while 2.4% lived in rural areas.

Of the 1,174 households, 35.9% had children under the age of 18 living in them. Of all households, 51.6% were married-couple households, 16.6% were households with a male householder and no spouse or partner present, and 26.6% were households with a female householder and no spouse or partner present. About 23.7% of all households were made up of individuals and 10.2% had someone living alone who was 65 years of age or older.

There were 1,302 housing units, of which 9.8% were vacant. The homeowner vacancy rate was 0.7% and the rental vacancy rate was 8.2%.

Burnettown racial composition
Race	Num.	Perc.
White (non-Hispanic)	2,021	65.09%
Black or African American (non-Hispanic)	658	21.19%
Native American	12	0.39%
Asian	24	0.77%
Pacific Islander	1	0.03%
Other/Mixed	141	4.54%
Hispanic or Latino	248	7.99%

=== 2010 census ===
As of the 2010 census, the total population was 2,673, of whom 0.64% were American Indian or Alaska native, 0.75% were Asian, 14.22% were African American, 78.34% were white, 4.00% were some other race, and 2.06% were two or more races. 6.40% of the population were Hispanic or Latino of any race. The population was 50.17% male and 49.83% female.

The age distribution of the population was 6.17% under 5 years of age, 16.91% age 5 to 17, 60.68% age 18 to 64, and 16.24% age 65 and over.

=== 2000 census ===
As of the census of 2000, there were 2,720 people, 1,066 households, and 770 families residing in the town. The population density was 563.5 inhabitants per square mile (217.6/km^{2}). There were 1,183 housing units at an average density of 245.1 per square mile (94.6/km^{2}). The racial makeup of the town was 86.40% White, 11.88% African American, 0.26% Native American, 0.59% Asian, 0.26% from other races, and 0.62% from two or more races. Hispanic or Latino of any race were 0.74% of the population.

There were 1,066 households, out of which 31.3% had children under the age of 18 living with them, 57.0% were married couples living together, 10.6% had a female householder with no husband present, and 27.7% were non-families. 25.2% of all households were made up of individuals, and 11.2% had someone living alone who was 65 years of age or older. The average household size was 2.52 and the average family size was 3.00.

In the town, the population was spread out, with 24.4% under the age of 18, 8.6% from 18 to 24, 28.0% from 25 to 44, 26.0% from 45 to 64, and 13.0% who were 65 years of age or older. The median age was 38 years. For every 100 females, there were 102.4 males. For every 100 females age 18 and over, there were 94.1 males.

The median income for a household in the town was $33,140, and the median income for a family was $38,017. Males had a median income of $29,063 versus $22,364 for females. The per capita income for the town was $15,887. About 5.0% of families and 8.4% of the population were below the poverty line, including 8.2% of those under age 18 and 13.7% of those age 65 or over.

== Education ==
It is in the Aiken County Public School District. Elementary schools including sections in their attendance boundaries are Clearwater, Gloverville, and Jefferson. LBC Middle School and Leavelle McCampbell Middle School take sections of Burnettown. Midland Valley High School is the zoned high school for all of Burnettown.
