= Warrenville =

Warrenville may refer to the following places in the United States:

- Warrenville, Illinois
- Warrenville, South Carolina
- Warrenville, a populated place and road in Warren Township, New Jersey
