= Langley, South Carolina =

- Census-designated place
- Location within South Carolina
- Coordinates: 33°30′43″N 81°50′04″W
- Country: United States
- State: South Carolina
- County: Aiken
- Named for: William C. Langley

Area
  - Total: 1.14 sq mi (2.95 km^{2})
  - Land: 1.14 sq mi (2.94 km^{2})
  - Water: 0.0039 sq mi (0.01 km^{2})
- Elevation: 292 ft (89 m)

Population (2020)
  - Total: 1,485
  - Density: 1,307.6/sq mi (504.87/km^{2})
- Time zone: UTC-5 (Eastern (EST))
  - Summer (DST): UTC-4 (EDT)
- ZIP code: 29834
- Area codes: 803 and 839
- FIPS code: 45-40390
- GNIS feature ID: 2584532

Langley is a census-designated place (CDP) in Aiken County, South Carolina, United States. The population was 1,447 at the 2010 census. It is bordered by Gloverville to the northeast and Burnettown to the west.

Langley is part of the Augusta, Georgia metropolitan area. Langley is located in historic Horse Creek Valley. It sits next to the Langley pond.

== History ==
The town was named Langley in March 1870, at a meeting of the Board of Directors for the Langley Manufacturing Company in nearby Hamburg. The name was chosen in honor of William C. Langley of Brooklyn, New York, the company's principal stockholder. The original name was Kalmia, after the Kalmia Mills, purchased by Langley and several other stockholders. This was reported in The Augusta Chronicle in March 1870. According to Who Was Who in America, William C. Langley was a shrewd and astute 19th-century businessman who amassed a fortune in the textile industry.

== Demographics ==
Historical population
Census	Pop.	Note	%±
2010	1,447		—
2020	1,485		2.6%
U.S. Decennial Census

=== 2010 Census ===
As of the 2010 census, the population of Langley was 1,447. 0.35% of the population were of American Indian or Alaska Native, 0.28% were Asian, 4.77% were African American, 0.07% were Native Hawaiian or other Pacific Islander, 91.91% were white, 0.83% were some other race, and 1.80% were of two or more races. Persons of Hispanic or Latino origin (of any race) comprised 2.56% of the population.

Males made up 48.79% of the population, and females 51.21%. Children under age 5 were 7.46% of the population, persons aged 5 to 17 were 15.89%, persons aged 18 to 64 were 62.61%, and persons aged 65 or over were 14.03% of the population.

== Education ==
It is in the Aiken County Public School District.

Zoned schools in most areas are Jefferson Elementary School, Langley-Bath-Clearwater (LBC) Middle School, and Midland Valley High School.
