= Midland Valley =

Midland Valley may refer to:

- Midland Valley Railroad, a 20th-century railway in the USA that ran from Kansas to Arkansas
- Central Lowlands, a geographical feature of Scotland
- Midland Valley (South Carolina), a region in Aiken County, South Carolina, USA
