= Avondale Mills =

Textile mill system in the American Southeast

Coordinates: 33.182674°N 86.258525°W

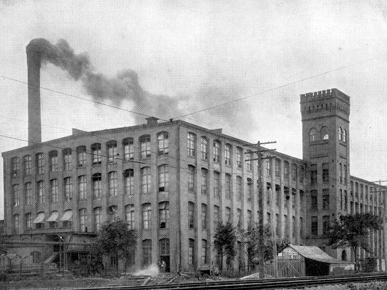
- Avondale Mills in Birmingham
- Type: Textile Mill
- Industry: Textiles
- Founded: 1897
- Founder: The Trainer Family of Chester, PA; Braxton Bragg Comer; The Birmingham Commercial Club
- Defunct: July, 2006

The Avondale Mills were a system of textile mills located predominantly in Alabama, but also in Georgia and the Carolinas, with headquarters in Birmingham, and later in Sylacauga, Alabama. The Birmingham neighborhood of Avondale was chosen to be the site of the first mill, hence the naming of the company. Founded in 1897, the mills employed thousands of Alabamians throughout its 109-year history until they closed in 2006. Avondale Mills was founded in 1897 by a consortium of investors including the Trainer family of Chester, Pennsylvania, the future governor of Alabama, Braxton Bragg Comer, and a group of Birmingham civic leaders including Frederick Mitchell Jackson Sr.

The mills refined the plentiful cotton from Alabama fields and, at its peak, devoured 20% of the entire state of Alabama's cotton production. The owners and operators of Avondale Mills were noted not only for progressive stances with regards to the overall well-being of their workers, but also for conditions of child labor that, while common at the time, are today considered abusive.

The mills were operated solely in Alabama until Donald Comer released control of Avondale Mills to his brother-in-law, Craig Smith, who helped expand the mills into both Georgia and South Carolina. Walton Monroe Mills Inc. purchased Avondale Mills in 1986. In 1995, the owning firm acquired the textile operations of the Graniteville Company. Disaster struck when, on the morning of January 6, 2005, a train accident outside of the Graniteville, South Carolina, mill caused a large chlorine gas leak from a ruptured tank car that killed 9 people on the train and surrounding area. In 2006, as a result of the Graniteville disaster and increased competition from overseas, Avondale formally shuttered its operations.

== History ==
=== Creation ===
The Trainer family of Chester, Pennsylvania sought to expand their already successful textile operations into the American South to bring their operations closer to the source of their raw materials. The Birmingham region appealed to them chiefly due to its wide labor pool and proximity to the abundant cotton fields of Alabama, as well as the transportation infrastructure of Birmingham that allowed for easy transport of their refined materials throughout the American south and the United States as a whole.

Southern communities, since before the Civil War, had wanted to introduce new manufacturing facilities as a means of resisting economic domination by Northern industrialists. Industry was difficult to develop in Alabama, particularly, however, due to the states deficit of navigable waterways, a relatively unstable banking system which both combined to discourage widespread investment in manufacturing facilities within the state. Alabama was at the bottom of the list in terms of textile production in southern states. In 1852, There were 40 mills in Georgia operating with 80,000 spindles; Tennessee had 30 mills with 36,000 spindles in operation; and Alabama came in last with only 12 mills and a total of 12,580 spindles. Many throughout the south advocated for the region's favorability in the textile manufacturing industries specifically because the south accounted for the vast majority, if not the entirety, of the nation's cotton production. Thus, locating textile refineries near the sources of raw materials made economic sense. The industry gained a foothold prior to the Civil War as mills began opening. In 1860, 1,312 people were employed in textile mills in Alabama. That number plummeted, however, following the war. By 1870, only 744 people were employed in textile mills.

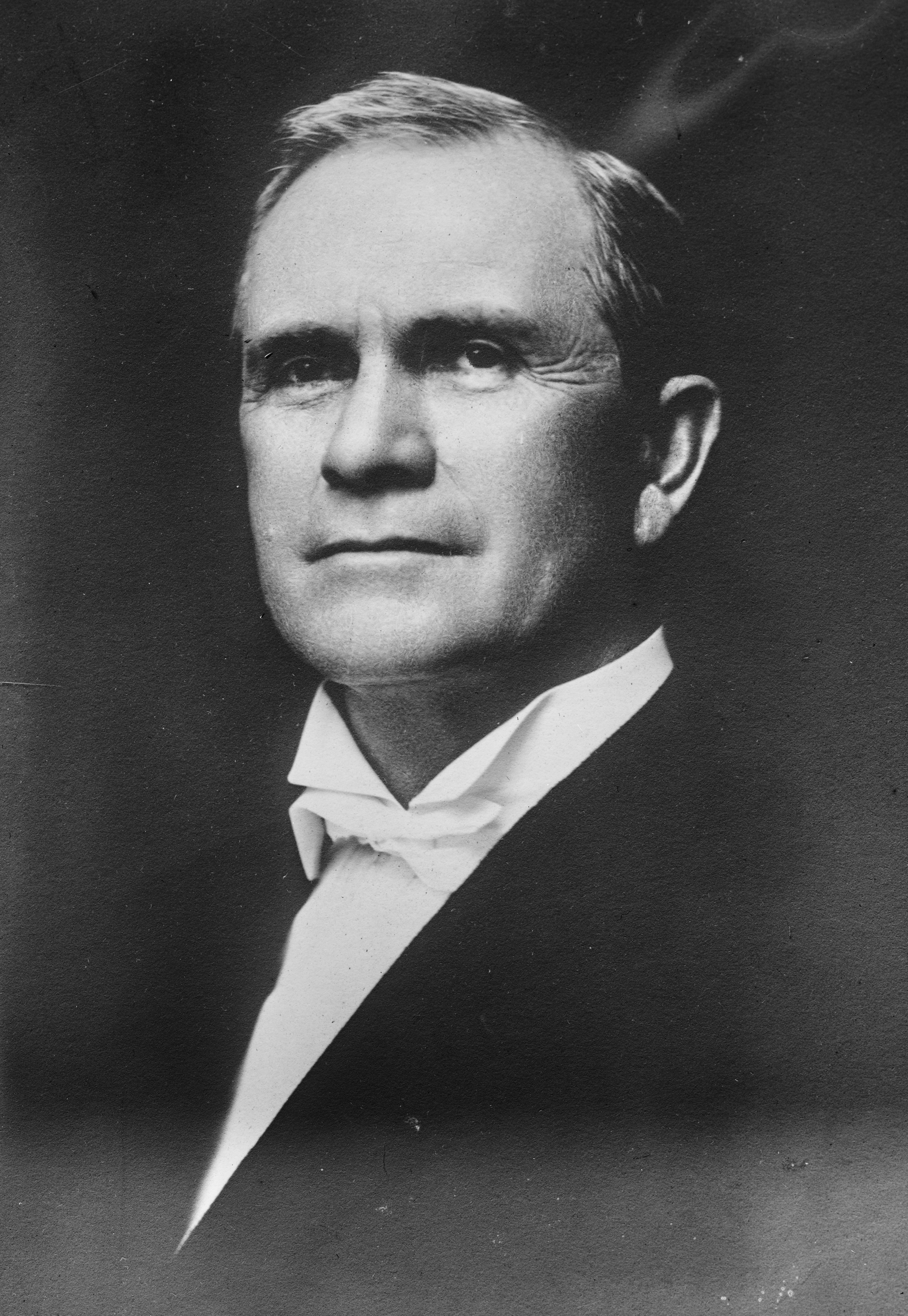
B.B. Comer

The family contacted the Birmingham Commercial Club, that would later become the Birmingham Chamber of Commerce, "...which had been organized in 1887 to encourage trade and create more economic diversification..." in the extraction focused Birmingham region. The Commercial Club agreed to invest $150,000 (~$4.5 million adjusted for inflation), and civic leader Braxton Bragg "B.B." Comer, having been recruited to serve as president of the mill, offered $10,000 (~$300,000 adjusted for inflation) as an investment. B.F. Roden, owner of the Avondale Land Company, provided the land for the mill under the condition that the mill be named "Avondale Mills". Comer's experience as a banker, miller and cotton farmer made him an ideal candidate for the job. Shortly after he assumed the presidency, The Trainer family abandoned the project before the mills had even opened, and Comer bought out the family's shares and assumed majority control. Through their efforts, they created the first cotton cloth manufacturing plant in Birmingham.

Initially, financing the construction of the mills proved troublesome. With high interest rates and scarce available capital, Comer and the Birmingham Commercial Club took out loans from noted Wall Street banker DuMont Clark, and secured funding from J.M. Lewis of Talladega, Alabama who took out $100,000 in bonds for the construction of the mills.

=== Early years ===
The early days of the mill were troublesome for Comer and the other principal operators. The first sale of refined materials, placed through a designated selling agency, priced the fabric at 2¢ per yard. The program for the sale of refined cloth from the mills allowed for sales to be made through sales agents without approval or permission of the mill president. Comer demanded that the scheme be halted, and mandated that no future sales would be honored without his prior approval. The selling agents balked at his demands and called a meeting of the mills' stockholders to demand Comer's removal from office. The efforts of Frederick Jenks, of Fales and Jenks Machinery Company, kept Comer in office.

Comer's staff initially consisted of himself and two other men. Comer wrote his own letters in long-hand script and personally bought, weighed, classified and sold all of the cotton for the mills.

By 1898, Avondale Mills employed nearly 400 people as spinners, weavers and mechanics and, additionally, realized a profit of $15,000 (~$450,000 adjusted for inflation). in 1906, Comer was elected Governor of Alabama, however he retained presidency of the mills. By 1907, under the management of Comer's son, Donald Comer, the mills had generated $55,000 (~$1.5 million adjusted for inflation) in profit.

The success of the Avondale Mills, and the potential tax revenue that it included, proved critical in passage of the "Greater Birmingham" movement that incorporated many of the outlying suburbs into the city limits of Birmingham. Following an earlier defeat decades before, the "Greater Birmingham" initiative came in 1911 before Governor Comer, who subsequently agreed to the majority of its provisions. Birmingham, in one fell swoop, saw its population swell to 132,685 and saw its land area increase to 48 square miles. With the passage of the bill, the city also adopted the commission style of government used until 1963. The improvements to many of the seven outlying suburbs that were incorporated into Birmingham included added transportation infrastructure, better access to social services, and increased sanitation.

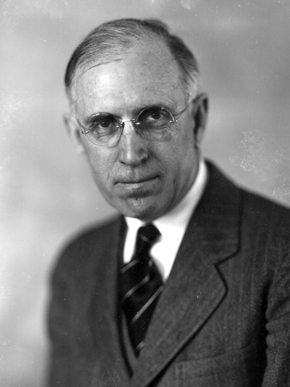
Donald Comer

Avondale Mills had a dramatic effect on the demographic landscape of Birmingham and the surrounding regions. As the price of cotton fell in the latter half of the 19th century, many Alabama farmers found themselves searching for new means of income. Avondale Mills provided steady paychecks and plentiful working hours. While typical farm labor could provide a family with $400 annually (~$10,500 adjusted for inflation), a single person working at the mills could earn up to $700 annually (~$18,500 adjusted for inflation). With the availability of work for all members of the family, income possibilities rose even more. Impoverished black and white workers flocked to the city to work in Comer's mill.

==== Working and living conditions ====
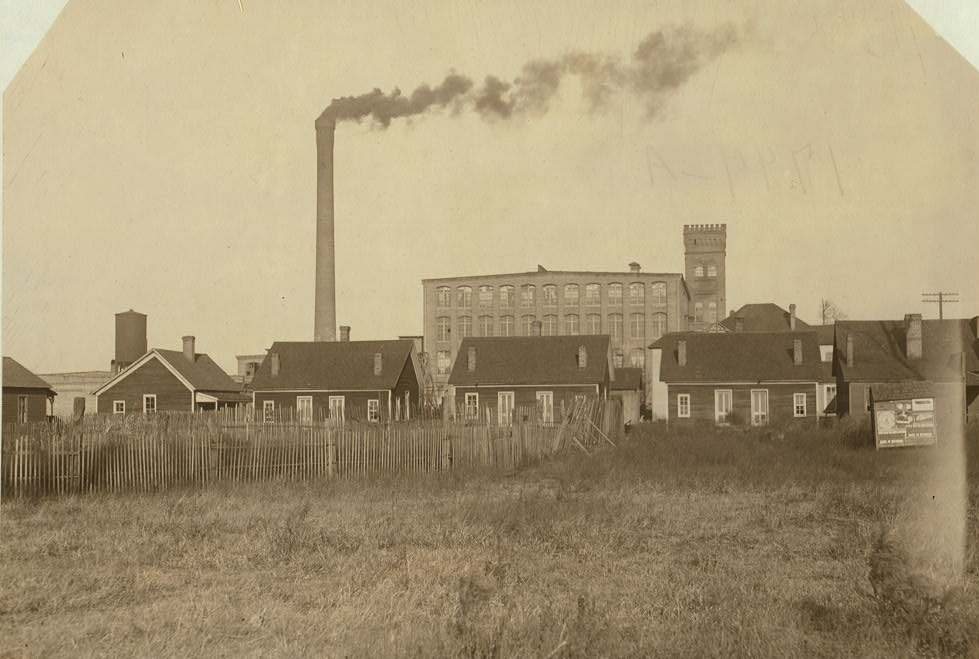
Avondale Mill Village, Birmingham

Notable among Avondale Mills' achievements were the numerous, uncharacteristic amenities offered to employees and their families. As president of the mills, B. B. Comer continued his tendency towards what has been described as "plantation-paternalism" by maintaining his involvement in many of the daily, domestic activities of his employees. While many mill owners throughout America provided their workers with housing at that time, the facilities provided by Comer surpassed the standard in terms of both quality and quantity.

===== Mill village =====
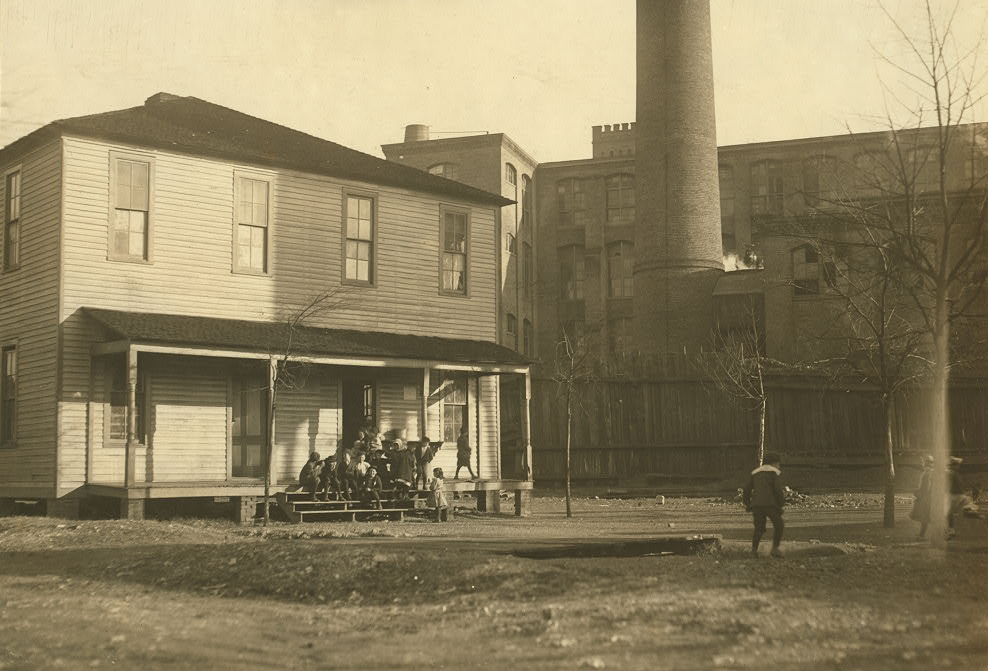
Avondale Mill Schoolhouse

Mill workers generally lived in the Avondale Mill's worker's housing communities, worshiped at the on-site church, and sent their children to the on-site school. B. B. Comer established a kindergarten at the mill, run by his daughters, Mignon, Catherine and Eva. The educational facilities provided by Comer at Avondale Mills far surpassed those offered at other mills throughout America. His schools would often accept children from the surrounding community whose parents did not work at the mills. Comer also established night schools for workers with assistance from the Alabama Department of Education, called Opportunity Schools. Children of employees also received no interest college loans that were generally forgiven if the student graduated.

The mill village Comer provided, consisting of 129 houses in Birmingham, was also notable for the quality of its conditions. While most other mill villages in America provided workers with outhouses either behind or between worker houses, Comer introduced interior sanitation facilities. B.B. Comer's son, Bragg Comer, supervised the construction of the Drummond Fraser Hospital, a 35-bed facility, that provided medical care for mill workers. Additionally, workers were charged 75¢ each week in rent, while salaries averaged anywhere between $12 and $20 per week. The mill village also included a dairy and a poultry farm for the benefit of the workers. Home ownership in the mill village was available to families. As of 1947, fully 1,100 Avondale employees had bought their own homes, the majority of which owned them without debt of mortgage.

Mill workers were paid in cash, but they could also opt to be paid partially in company scrip to be used in the company store. Truly unique for its time, Avondale Mills offered employees $1 of scrip for only 80¢. This, effectively, gave employees a 20% discount on all goods bought at the village store as the village store matched its prices with those of stores in downtown Birmingham.

===== Recreational resorts for mill workers =====
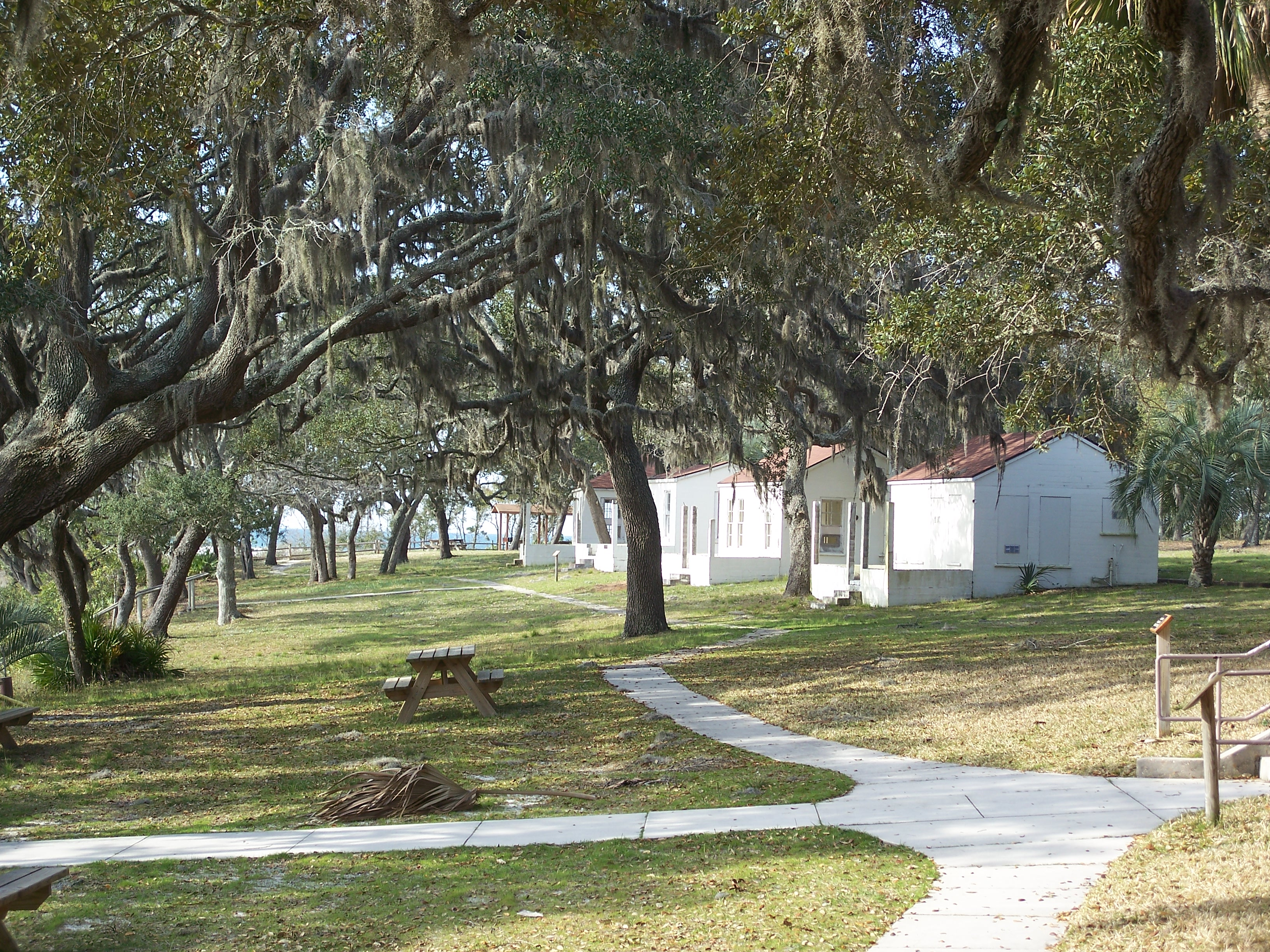
Cabins at Camp Helen. Panama City, Florida.

During the summer, mill workers could enjoy paid vacations at the Panama City, Florida resort purchased by Comer for his employees. Comer closed the mills at different times throughout the summer in order to allow his workers to enjoy the vacation resort at their leisure. In a move truly exceptional for a white business owner in the deeply segregated American south, Comer even provided for his African-American workers to visit the resort, albeit not when white workers were present. Known as Camp Helen, the resort included a large main building and several guest cottages strewn about the property.

Avondale Mills also provided Camp Brownie, a recreational facility on the Coosa River for workers to enjoy boating and fishing in their off-time.

===== Access to amenities =====
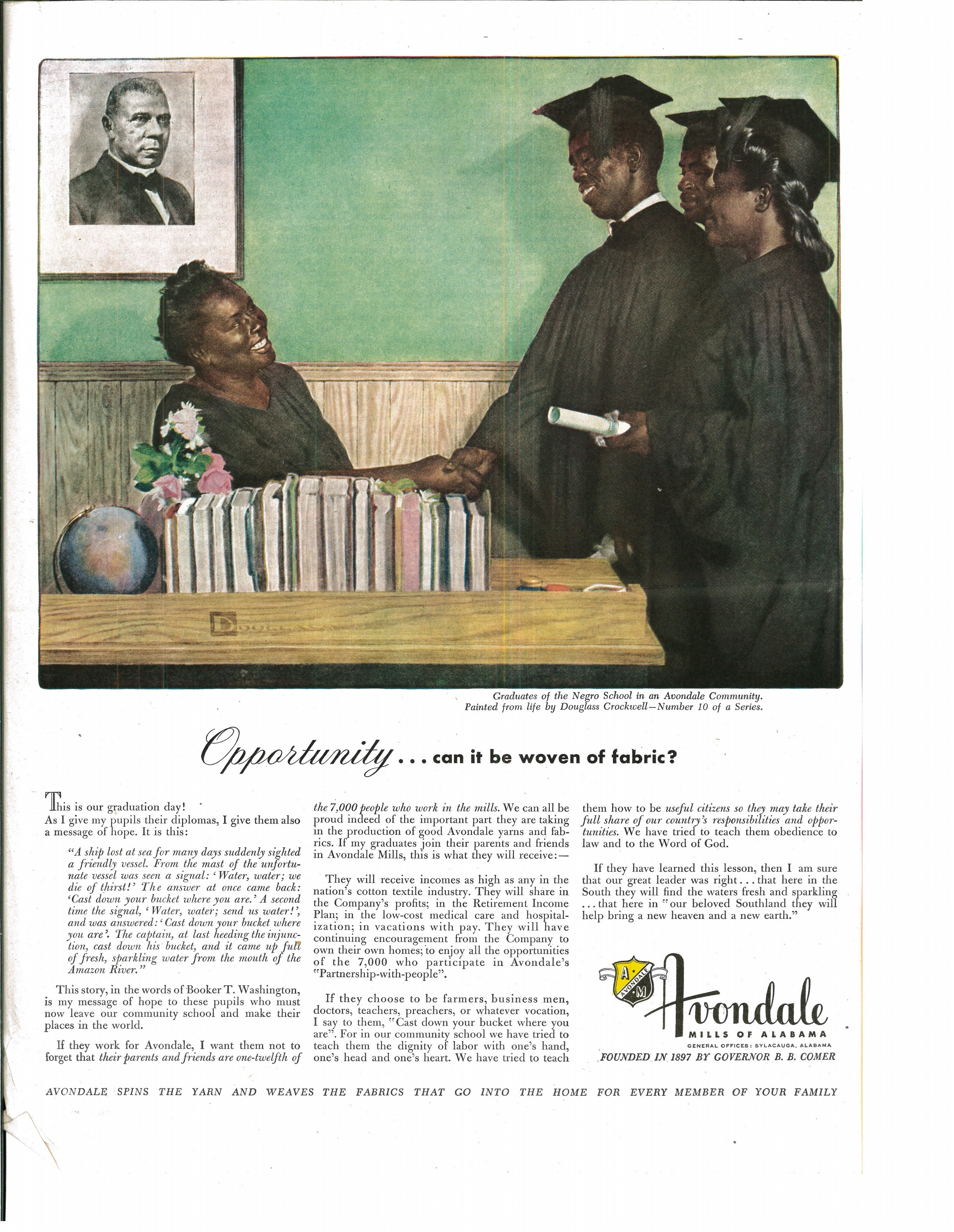
Advertisement from 1948 depicting the equal opportunities afforded to African Americans at Avondale Mills.

Avondale Mills was a bright spot in an otherwise dismal landscape of race relations in Birmingham. Out of 8,500 employees in 1947, fully 12%, or about 1,020, were African American, all of whom received equal access to the amenities provided by Comer. The mills' African American workers were noted for being "...on exactly the same basis industrially as the white workers...with the same opportunities to share in profits, to own homes and farms, to enjoy recreational and school facilities and to save their money."

===== Working conditions =====
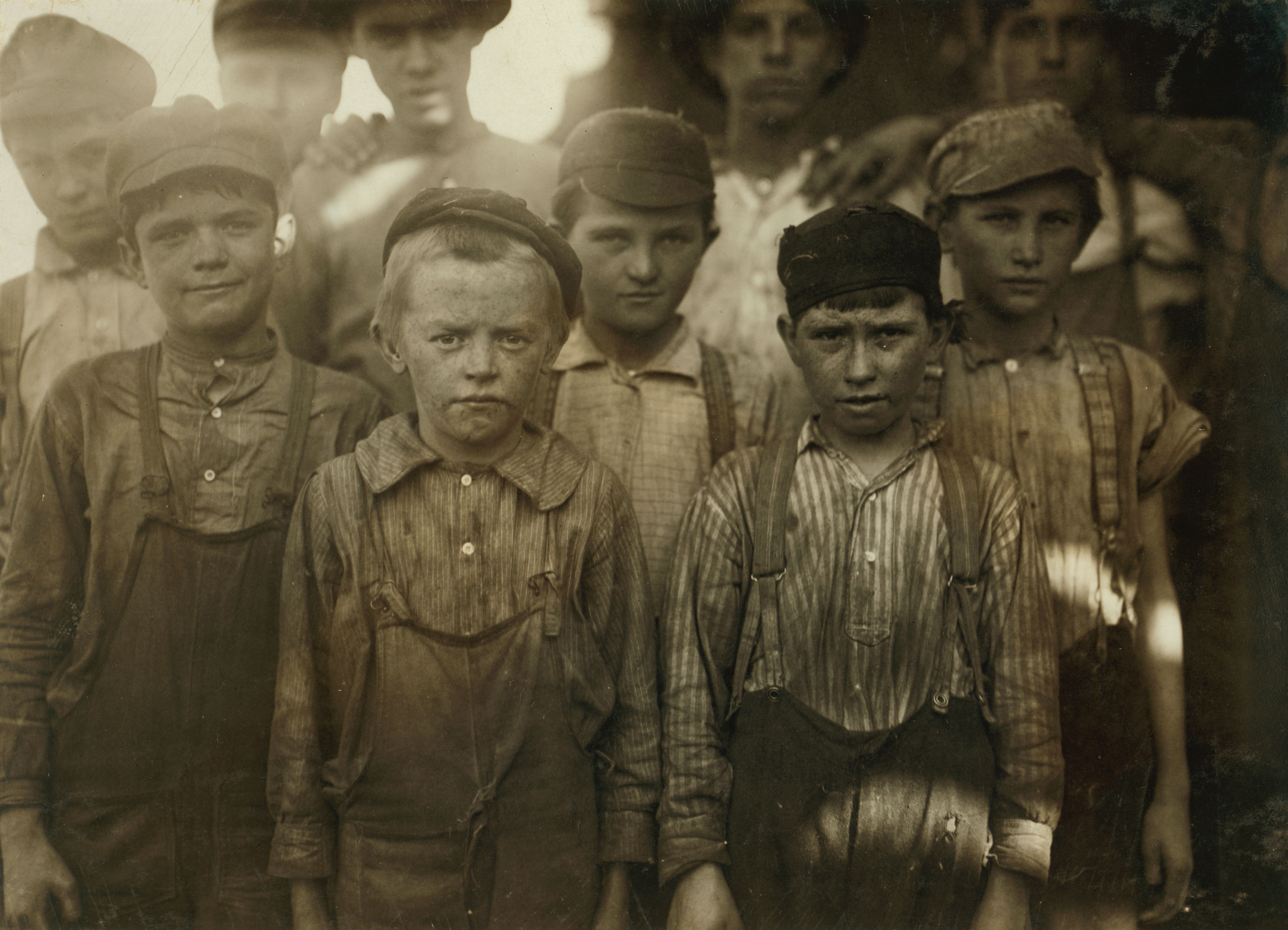
Child Workers at Avondale Mills, Birmingham

Working conditions at Avondale Mills were generally comparable to other textile mills in America. A product of his time, Comer utilized child labor relatively extensively at Avondale Mills. Alabama state law, at the time, required that no children younger than 12 be employed. Many of the families who moved to Birmingham from more rural, farming communities, were accustomed to children working alongside adults, and they expected their children to do the same at the mills. Conditions at mills, however, were quite different than conditions on a farm. "On the farm, children worked hard but at their own pace, with no penalty for stopping. Mill work, however, endangered children because they often did not have the stamina or physical strength to work long hours." Fatigue on a farm could lead to mistakes, but fatigue in a mill could lead to death.

Comer argued that it was the parents of the children who wanted them to work, and that he was simply responding to their demands. Comer also actively opposed child labor regulations that would have curbed his ability to employ minors. In 1900, out of a total of 774 employees, 187 were children aged between 8 and 15.

Lewis Hine, an American sociologist and photographer studying industrial conditions, visited the mills during 1910 and documented his findings with photographs. Hine's photographs and interviews in 1910 revealed that numerous children were employed at Avondale Mills with "mere weeks of education if any." The state law required that children be educated and that none younger than twelve work in factories. At first the children were not "officially" employed, but were recruited to assist their parents in completing strenuous twelve-hour shifts in the mill.

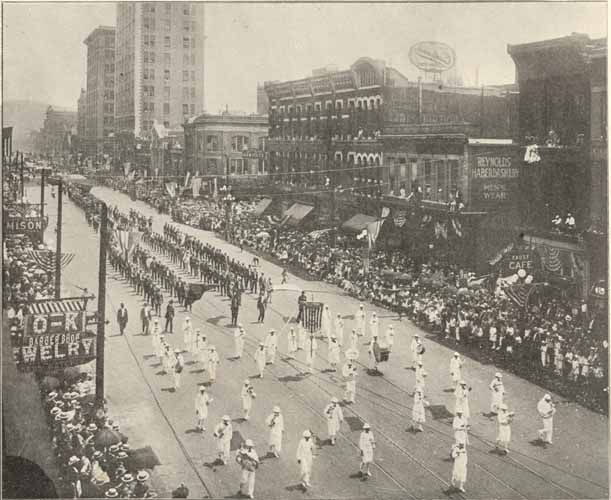
Avondale Mill Band

Hine noted numerous examples of child labor and abuse of children at Avondale Mills, including that of the 14 and 15-year-old girls Mary and Miller Gilliam. Their father had removed them from school to work at the mills; he had no job at the time. Hine recorded that "none of the children would admit to being younger than 12 years of age ". He wrote, "The Mill bosses...arrived at school anytime during the day to remove children to work at the Mill.". When demand for textiles was low, the children were allowed to return to school. The children were a source of cheap labor who could be flexibly employed according to the needs of the mill managers.

At 12 years of age, children could begin work at Avondale Mills as bobbin doffers. This was a fast-paced job that required dexterity but little technical skill. The room where the children worked became filled with lint from the operation. This got into their lungs, and the children often later developed brown lung disease as adults.

Comer's views would evolve along with national attitudes, however, and he would subsequently support a nationwide ban on child labor in 1934.

Having assumed management of Avondale Mills in 1907, Donald Comer embarked on a path of expansion for the mills. He built a new mill in Sylacauga, Alabama in 1913 and named it the Eva Jane in honor of B.B. Comer's wife. The opening of the mill was described as "the most important event in the town's history. Donald Comer would later open the Sallie B. No. 1 and Catherine mills in 1919, and the Sallie B. No. 2 in 1926, all in The Mills were generally located in rural areas. Locating the mills so close to the homes of the primary labor pool, that of poor, rural farmers, allowed those farmers to earn higher wages while at the mill than they would otherwise by farming while still maintaining ownership and control of the land.

== Mid-20th century ==
=== The Great Depression ===
Mirroring conditions throughout the United States, worker hours, production and pay rates all saw cuts during the Great Depression. In 1933, labour organizers in Birmingham began unionizing many industries in response to the downturn in conditions. Comer reiterated to Avondale employees the quality of life enjoyed at his mills. Textile workers throughout the state walked off the job 1934 to protest steep declines in wages. In the midst of this larger turmoil, however, only one shift, a night shift in July 1934, walked off the job at any of Comer's plants.

Many labor activists considered the Comers, Donald in particular, to be "the one shining light" amongst Birmingham area business owners. Noted for the "very enlightened and benevolent" programs available to workers, Avondale Mills escaped much of the labor protests characteristic of textile mills in the 1930s. Many, however, resented the paternalistic nature of the amenities afforded by Avondale.

During this time, Comer's views on child labor took on a distinctly more progressive tone. In the early 1930s, he began instituting regulations that prohibited night work for both women and children. In 1934, Comer backed an effort to institute a nationwide ban on child labor.

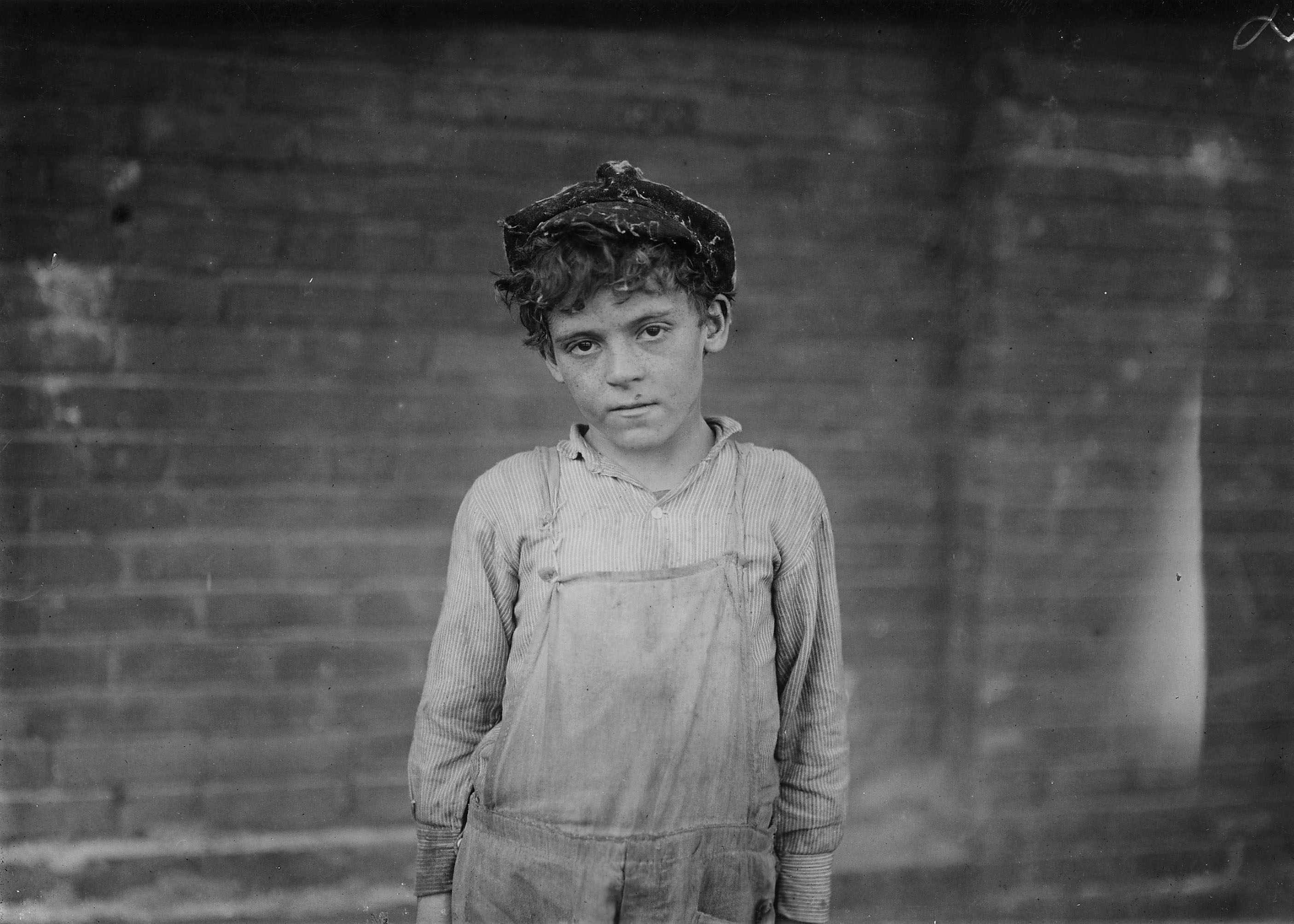
Child Worker at Avondale Mills, Pell City, Alabama.

=== World War 2 ===
During World War 2, B.B. Comer was appointed to the War Labor Board to help avoid work stoppages. As companies saw dramatically increased profits during the wartime manufacturing boom, workers throughout the United States began demanding higher wages, and, on occasion, walked off the job. To avoid this situation at his own plants, Comer instituted a profit sharing agreement with his employees wherein, by 1950, over $12 million had been shared with his 7,000 or so workers.

=== Profit sharing ===
Profit sharing incentives were introduced to nearly all employees in 1941. Employees were paid a standard wage, on top of which their share of the company's profits were added. In 1947, fully 19.7%, on average, of every employees pay check was from profit sharing income. Profits were split between the company and employees on a 50/50 share basis. A Look magazine article in 1949 described the mills as "The Plant That Runs on Happiness."

=== Post-war years ===
Donald Comer released management control of Avondale Mills to James Craig Smith Jr., who expanded the company's production facilities in Georgia and South Carolina.

== Later years ==
Avondale Mills continued throughout much of the 20th century on a path of success. In the early 1980s, the company realized a record $300 million in sales. The company endured turbulent times shortly thereafter, however, and lost $14 million as sales declined 20%. Over the course of five years, four CEO's came and went until the company was sold to Walton Monroe Mills, Inc. in 1986 for $165 million.

Following its sale to Walton Monroe Mills, Avondale Mills and Walton Monroe operated as separate entities until 1993 when the two merged to become Avondale Incorporated. In 1996, Avondale Inc. purchased the Graniteville Company, a textile manufacturer out of Graniteville, South Carolina.

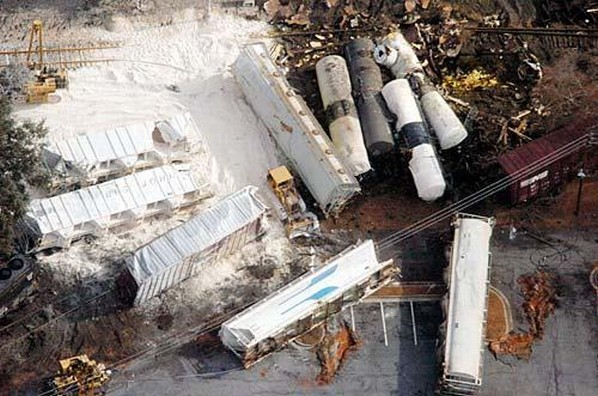
Graniteville, SC disaster scene.

On January 6, 2005, a serious train derailment at the Graniteville facility caused a massive chemical spill resulting in the deaths of six Avondale Inc. employees. A Norfolk Southern train traveling at speed hit an improperly aligned switch and crashed into a parked locomotive. The crash sent 16 train cars careening into a parking lot next to one of Avondale's data processing centers at the facility. One of the cars, carrying 90 tons of chlorine, ruptured and sent a massive cloud of chlorine gas through the facility and the neighboring town. In all, nine people died as a result of the crash.

In May 2006, following a settlement agreement with Norfolk Southern Railroad, Avondale Mills' CEO, Robert Williams Sr., announced that Avondale Mills would formally close all of its operations. Over 4,000 people in four states found themselves unemployed as a result.

== See also ==
- B.B. Comer
- Camp Helen
- Avondale Mill Village
