= Avondale Mill Historic District =

Historic district in Alabama, United States

- U.S. National Register of Historic Places
- U.S. Historic district
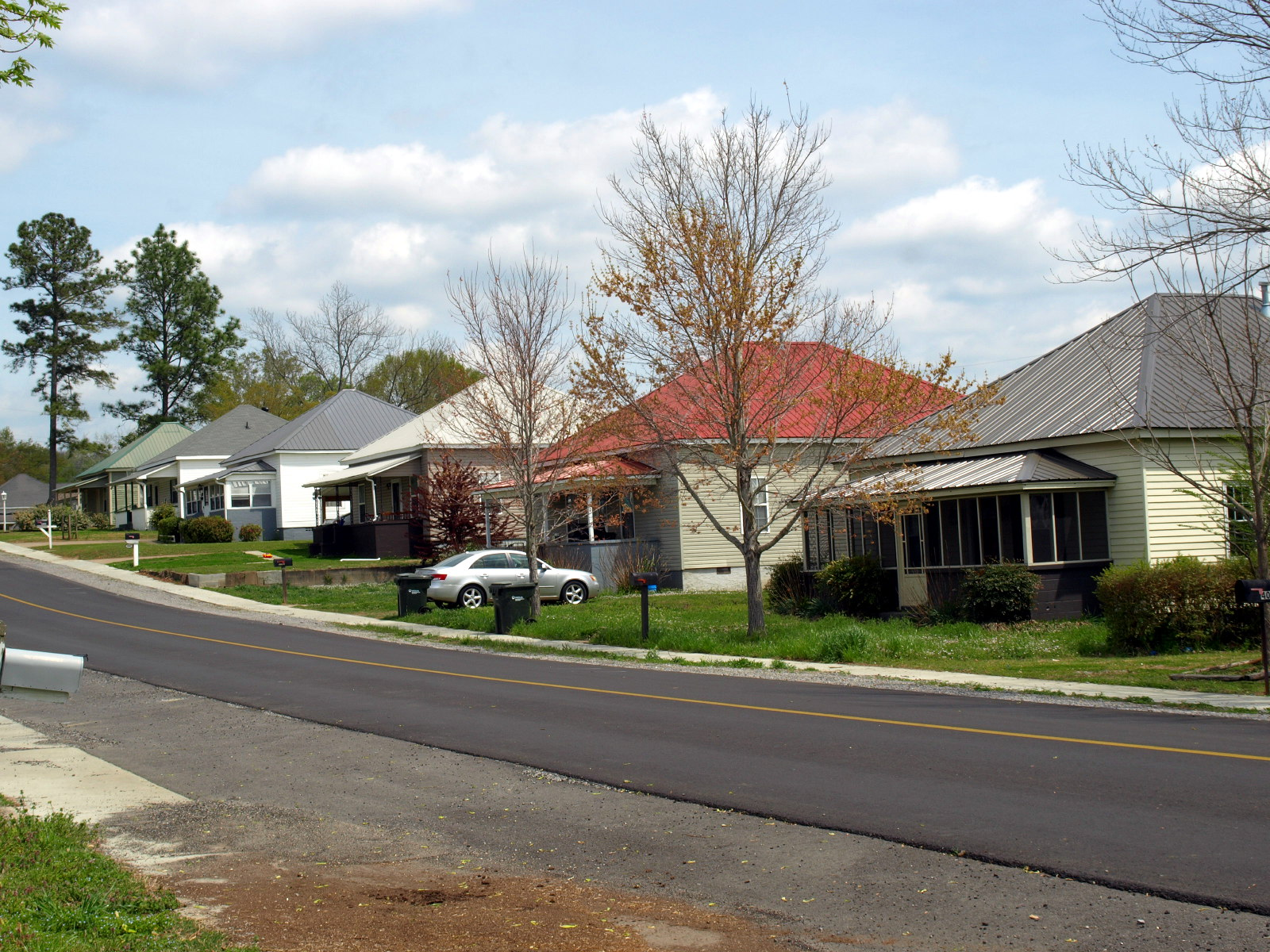
- Houses on 29th Street North

- Location within Alabama Location within the United States
- Location: Roughly bounded by 25th St. N, 7th Ave. N, 30th St. N, and S of 4th Ave. N., Pell City, Alabama
- Coordinates: 33°35′34″N 86°16′42″W
- Area: 150 acres (61 ha)
- Built: 1903
- Architect: F.P. Sheldon
- NRHP reference No.: 00001030
- Added to NRHP: August 31, 2000

The Avondale Mill Historic District is a former mill village in Pell City, Alabama. Part of the Avondale Mills, the area is architecturally significant for the first sawtooth roofed mill in Alabama, and the mill village represents a relatively intact example of an early 20th century company town. The mill and its village were listed on the National Register of Historic Places in 2000. The mill closed in 2006, and burned in 2008 while being dismantled for scrap.

== History ==
The mill was built in 1902–1903 on the northwestern outskirts of Pell City, at the confluence of the Seaboard Air Line Railroad and Southern Railway lines. Sumter Cogswell purchased the 400 acres (160 ha) of land in 1890 after stopping to change trains in the town. By 1902, he had convinced Atlanta industrialist George W. Pratt to build a cotton mill on the land. The following year, the Pell City Manufacturing Company began operational with 21,000 spindles and 640 looms.

In 1919, the mill was purchased by the Birmingham-based Avondale Mills Company. At the time, the mill employed 600 people. Avondale spent over $1 million improving the mill and village homes during the 1920s and 1930s. A hospital was built in 1925, streets in the village were paved, and 40 new houses were built, bringing the total to 163 by 1945. Mill capacity was expanded to 25,584 spindles, 800 looms, and 800 employees by 1940. The mill village was incorporated into Pell City in 1956, and the company gradually sold the houses to private owners.

Automation and foreign competition caused employment to decline beginning in the 1970s. In the aftermath of a deadly train crash at one of its facilities in South Carolina, Avondale closed its plants in Pell City and Sylacauga and sold several others in July 2006.

== Architecture ==
=== Mill ===
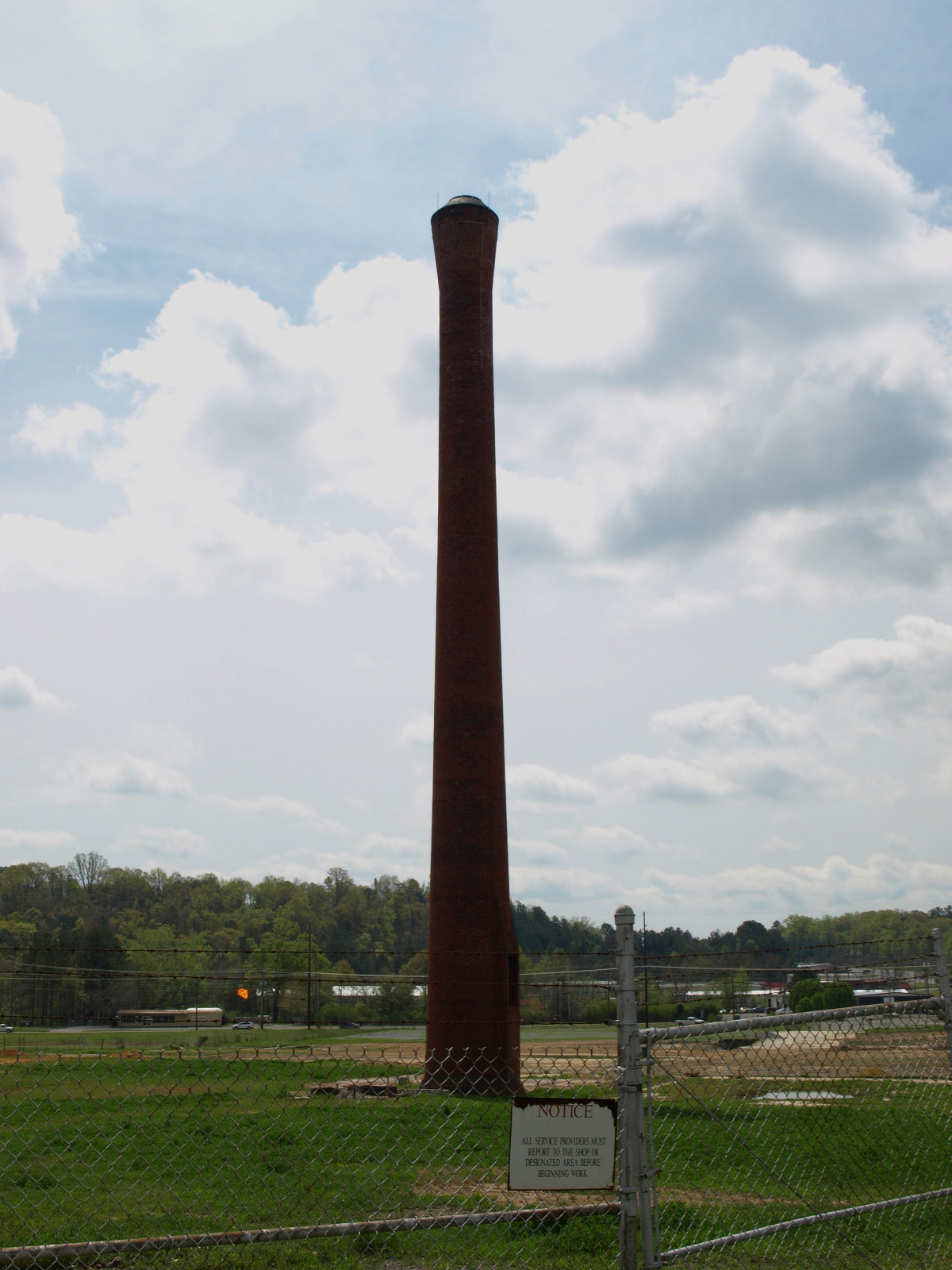
Chimney stack, demolished in November 2015

The main mill building was a two-story structure built of brick and measuring approximately 225 by 640 feet (70 by 200 meters). The mill featured a sawtooth roof, which allowed clerestory windows to be placed on the vertical roof sections for light and ventilation. It was the first saw-toothed mill in Alabama. The walls were lined with windows and blind arches, separated by stepped string courses. The walls are punctuated by protruding buttresses at the bases of the sawtooths and small vents that open into the clerestory area. Four two-story pavilions spaced along each of the long sides of the building contained restrooms and staircases. The interior was divided into four large rooms: the main mill room at the north end, the picker room and dye room in the middle, and the weaving room at the south end.

In addition to the main building, the complex consisted of engine and boiler rooms, a 180-foot (55 m) chimney stack, reservoir and water works, a warehouse, an office building, a cottonseed oil mill, and a cotton gin. Today, only the office and a water tower remain. The chimney stack was demolished on November 24, 2015, after two attempts at an implosion and then weakening the base with a backhoe. Part of the chimney fell on the backhoe cab, the driver was uninjured.

=== Mill village ===
The mill village was constructed at the same time as the mill, and originally consisted of 115 houses. The village grew to a height of 163 houses in 1945. Roads were laid out in a grid pattern to the north and east of the mill complex. Houses were built to four different plans: a pyramidal four-room plan with a central chimney and front porch that was either shed roofed or gable roofed; a side-gabled three room plan, which featured two equal-sized rooms with a rear shed room; a hipped roof three-room plan, where the main entry opens into a vestibule leading to the other two rooms; and a cross-gable six-room plan, which was built for managers and foremen and featured a central hipped roof with hipped roof ells on either side. The majority of the houses have been modified, many with rear additions and enclosed porches.

In addition to houses, the village also contained a school (closed in the 1960s and demolished in the 1970s), community house (used until it was demolished in the 1980s), and a hospital (built in 1925 and demolished in 1965).
