= Horse Creek Valley =

Coordinates: 33°27.37′N 81°55.26′W

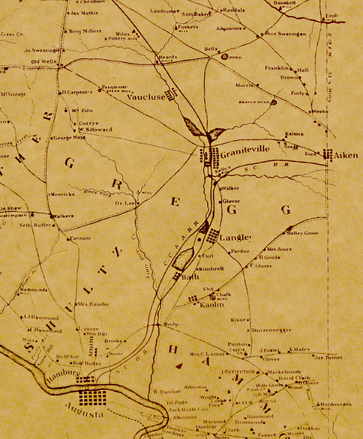
Horse Creek Valley as shown in Isaac Boles survey of Edgefield County, 1871

Horse Creek Valley is a geographic area along Horse Creek, a tributary of the Savannah River. It lies within present-day Aiken County, South Carolina (prior to 1872, in Edgefield District / Edgefield County). The area is alternately referred to as "Midland Valley". Rising near Vaucluse, South Carolina, Horse Creek enters the Savannah two miles downstream of downtown Augusta, Georgia. Other communities along Horse Creek include Graniteville, Warrenville, Gloverville, Langley, Burnettown, Bath, and Clearwater. While Horse Creek itself is rather insignificant, its potential for water power led to early examples of Southern industrialization, including a textile mill at Vaucluse (1830) and William Gregg's Graniteville Mill (1845). The textile industry continued to play a primary role until the Graniteville Train Derailment and final closure of the Graniteville Mill in 2006.

== History ==
=== 17th and 18th centuries ===
Henry Woodward recorded Westo Indians in the area during his pioneering travels from Charleston in 1674. The Westoes were already well connected with slaveholders in Virginia and terrorized neighboring tribes by their slave raids. The South Carolinians eventually foresaw more profit in trade than in these slave raids, and engineered an overthrow of the Westos in a 1690 trade war, after which the area was briefly occupied by Shawnee (Savannahs) (Bowne 2005). In 1723 the South Carolina Assembly invited the Chickasaw to occupy the area. Located in northern Mississippi, the Chickasaw relied on South Carolina as a source of guns, and agreed to send a colony under the so-called Squirrel King. In 1737 they were allocated a 21,774-acre (8,812 ha) tract along the northern/western bank of Horse Creek, extending from the Savannah River up to Vaucluse. These Chickasaws actively collaborated with the English in the defense of this area, especially during the Cherokee War in 1760. The Chickasaw returned to their homeland shortly before the American Revolutionary War (Cashin 2009: 11-36, 107-123).

=== 19th century ===
The rapid expansion of cotton farming led to commercial growth, first in Augusta on the Georgia side of the Savannah River, then at a South Carolina competitor founded in 1821 by Henry Shultz under the name of Hamburg. At the end of a growing season, farmers wagoned their bales of cotton overland to either of these towns, for sale into warehouses or onto boats for transport to Savannah or Charleston, and eventually textile mills in the northeastern U.S. and Europe. The farmers could then spend the proceeds shopping for manufactured goods to carry back home (Chapman 1897).

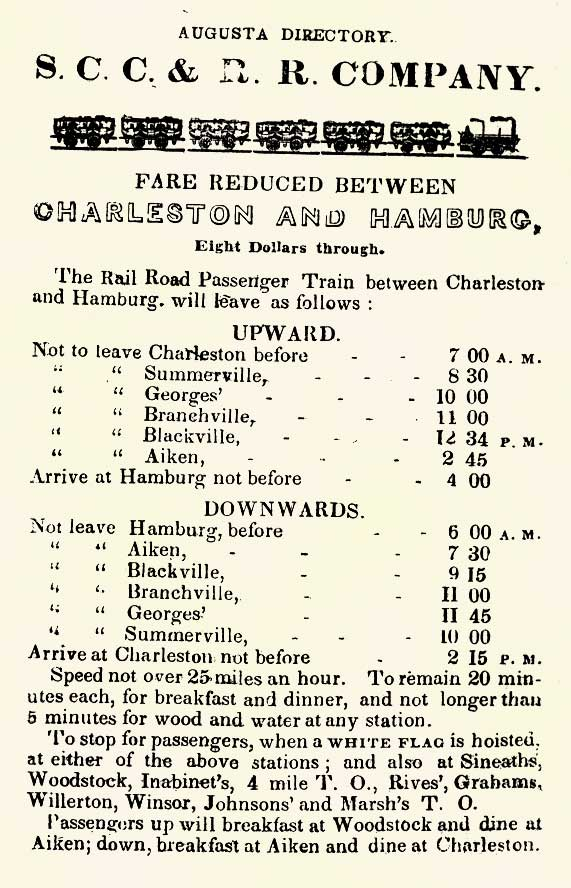
1841 SCC&RR Schedule

In order to divert traffic going by river to the more accessible port at Savannah, the South Carolina Rail Road was completed from Hamburg to Charleston in 1833. At 136 miles (219 km) in length, this was at the time the longest railroad in the world, and ran on published regular schedules with the exclusive use of steam power (Brown 1871 and Fetters 2008).

Horse Creek's power potential attracted early industries to the area. According to an 1885 survey, "Horse Creek crosses the fall line, and has a rapid fall, offering excellent advantages for power... it offers a good example of the large amount of power which can be obtained at small expense from a comparatively insignificant stream if it is only properly developed." (US Department of the Interior 1885: 132-133) An 1883 South Carolina survey noted 1807 horsepower previously developed, and a capacity for perhaps one-third more (SC State Board of Agriculture 1883: 206).

The first Horse Creek textile mill, located at Vaucluse in 1830, produced disappointing results. As noted by William Gregg, the causes included insufficient capital investment, excessive diversity of products, lack of a widespread marketing area, and insufficient hands-on management (Gregg 1845 in Tompkins 1899). Gregg, a great proponent of Southern industrialization, built a landmark mill embodying his ideas at Graniteville in 1845. While Gregg's success was well appreciated, it contradicted a Southern preference for the agrarian slave economy, and was not imitated for several decades.

Other industries taking advantage of Horse Creek water power were a paper mill at Bath and pottery works above Vaucluse. In 1860, the Benjamin Franklin Landrum pottery works reportedly manufactured 40,000 gallons capacity of stoneware annually, with three employees and a 1 HP water turbine. In the same year, the Lewis J. Miles pottery works manufactured 50,000 gallons with 13 employees and a 4 HP turbine. The famous potter Dave worked there as late as 1863. In 1880, this same establishment had a 35 HP water turbine (Baldwin 1995:95-99).

The Charlotte, Columbia and Augusta Railroad was built through the valley in the late 1860s. After the Civil War and Reconstruction, the textile industry entered a period of great expansion (Harper's Weekly article). By 1900, industrial establishments included the Graniteville, Seminole, Vaucluse, ... mills and employment along the Valley was ... (Kohn 1907).

=== 20th century ===
During this time, a popular winter resort for the wealthy developed at the headwaters of the valley, which eventually became known as the Aiken Winter Colony. The Whitney Polo Field, established in 1882, and the Palmetto Golf Course, begun in 1892, characterize the vacation pursuits, and the horse culture still thrives in Aiken. Thirty residences survive in the Aiken Winter Colony Historic District (SCDAH link). Pat Conroy's essay, Horses Don’t Eat Moon Pies, explored the juxtaposition of wealthy equestrians and the blue collar mill culture of the valley. In 1903 the Hampton Terrace Hotel opened in North Augusta, South Carolina, near the lower end of the valley, connected to Aiken by means of the Augusta-Aiken Railway. Rich, powerful and famous vacationers included John D. Rockefeller, Henry Ford, and Bing Crosby (source?).

The textile industries suffered the effects of the boll weevil (1920) and the Great Depression (1930). Labor strife at the Horse Creek Valley mills was a major theme of Erskine Caldwell's book God's Little Acre. After World War II, the industrial economy continued to decline until 2005, when the last mill left standing was impacted by the Graniteville Train Derailment. Nine people in the area were killed by an early morning chlorine spill. According to Avondale Mills, owners of the Graniteville Mill, lingering chemical corrosion over the following months caused extensive equipment damage, ostensibly making the facility uneconomical to repair and operate, and leading to its closure in 2006 (Augusta Chronicle, 12 January 2005 and 1 June 2006).

After environmental cleanup, Langley Pond at the lower end of the valley has become a recreation area. This former mill impoundment offers an Olympic-class rowing course and was used as a practice area for the 1996 Summer Olympic Games. The lake continues to host crews seeking warm weather practice areas during the winter months, with regattas attracting over 1,000 rowers (Midland Valley Area link).

In July 2011, a movie by Bryton Entertainment titled Graniteville: Past, Present, Future was presented at area movie theaters. It begins with William Gregg, continues to the train derailment in the present, and envisions possibilities for the future. Funding was provided in part by the GVW (Graniteville, Vaucluse, Warrenville) Community Investment Corporation.

On 22 September 2011, a one-hour movie by Storyline Media titled Horse Creek Valley... A Tale Worth the Telling premiered on SCETV’s Southern Lens. It covers 13,000 years of prehistory and history to the present. Funding was provided in part by Humanities Council SC.
