= Supplemental environmental project =

In United States environmental law, Supplemental environmental projects (SEPs) are environmental programs which are given to companies jointly by the United States Environmental Protection Agency (EPA) and the United States Department of Justice (DOJ) as an alternative to punishment for violating environmental laws. Given at the choice of the violator, they are intended to balance the damage to the environment companies cause with growth to the environment. The companies pay for the projects themselves, but are optional to partially clear fines. SEPs were officially created in February 1991, and were later revised in May 1995, May 1998, and most recently in 2015.

SEPs were banned by the DOJ during the second administration of Donald Trump, following an SEP which violated the Miscellaneous Receipts Act and the Antideficiency Act.

== Instances ==
- In 2005, following the settlement of the Graniteville train crash, a $100,000 SEP was created to plant vegetation nearby the site of the crash.
- In 2024, the settlement of the Curtis Bay Incinerator case included a $750,000 SEP.
- In 2016, a Maryland utility installed photovoltaic cells (solar energy systems) at two local schools and an environmental center as a part of a settlement.
