= Curtis Bay Incinerator =

Incinerator in Maryland, US

- Country: United States
- Location: 3200 Hawkins Point Road, Curtis Bay, Baltimore, Maryland
- Coordinates: 39°12′10″N 76°33′21″W
- Status: Commissioned
- Commission date: c. 1994
- Owners: Curtis Bay Energy, LP

The Curtis Bay Incinerator is a waste-to-energy plant located in Curtis Bay, Baltimore, in Maryland, United States. A major polluter, it is the largest biomedical waste incinerator in the United States.

== History ==
The Curtis Bay Incinerator is the largest biomedical waste incinerator in the United States. It was commissioned c. 1994. In 2021, Curtis Bay Medical Waste Services—the incinerator's owners' former name—were acquired by private equity firm Aurora Capital Partners, who changed its name to Curtis Bay Energy, LP.

== Pollution ==
A 2024 study found it causes $36.9 million in damages per year to public health, with regulations limits allowing it to cause as much as $107.1 million per year.

A 2019 investigation by the Maryland Department of the Environment (MDE) revealed the employees of the Curtis Bay Incinerator routinely mishandled biomedical waste, such as overfilling the steamers and undercooking the waste, at times by instruction of supervisors. Following an unnanounced inspection on November 8, 2019, a complaint was received that employees had disconnected an illegal pump and hose, concealing them beneath a leaking closed-loop steam condenser to hide them from the MDE inspector. In a later inspection on January 7, 2020, the concealment was found to have occurred again. The pump and hose were being used to dump discharge to a nearby property. MDE sampled the discharge a single time in December 2019, and found it to be free from pollutants on that occasion.

On October 17, 2023, Curtis Bay Energy, LP—the incinerator's owners—were found guilty on forty counts of pollution, with a Maryland judge ordering the company to pay the Maryland Clean Water Fund $1,000,000 and were placed under probation for two years. Additionally, they were given a $750,000 supplemental environmental project, monitored by the Chesapeake Bay Trust. It was one of the biggest penalties of a Maryland environmental case.

Pollution at the Curtis Bay Incinerator continued, despite the lawsuit and in the face of a video camera evidence capturing it in the process. In January and February 2024, smoke was noted—on twelve occasions—to be coming out through ventilation shafts, instead of through the pollution control equipment. Greg Sawtell of the Community of Curtis Bay Association alleged that the Curtis Bay Incinerator illegally collects biomedical waste from multiple states, as well as Canada. Sawtell also stated that the Curtis Bay Incinerator's mercury emissions had been found to exceed regulatory limits over 400 times.

On March 20, 2024, Baltimore City Council organized a meeting on the Curtis Bay Incinerator.

On October 1, 2026, Maryland environmental officials and Curtis Bay Energy announced a settlement that would have Curtis Bay Energy pay a $600,000 penalty to the Maryland Department of the Environment and wind down its practice of burning medical waste. The Curtis Bay Incinerator is allowed to continue operating at a waste transfer facility, but at a significantly reduced capacity limit.
