= Lyons Woman's Club House =

- U.S. National Register of Historic Places
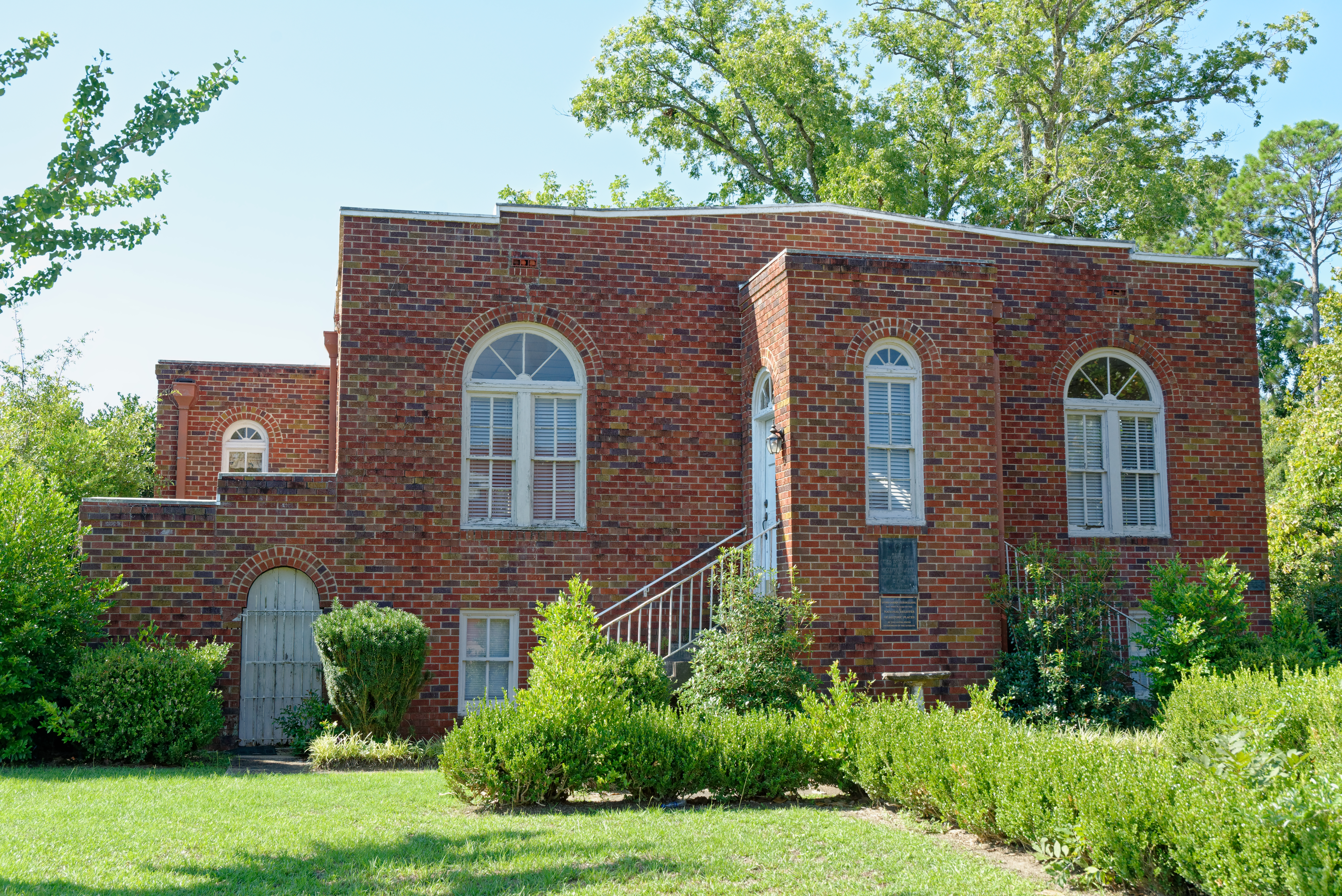
- The clubhouse in 2020

- Location within Georgia
- Location: East Liberty St., Lyons, Georgia
- Coordinates: 32.20285°N 82.32044°W
- Area: less than one acre
- Built: 1932
- Architect: Simmons, William W.
- Architectural style: Colonial Revival, Georgian Revival
- NRHP reference No.: 85000940
- Added to NRHP: May 2, 1985

The Lyons Woman's Club House in Lyons, Georgia was listed on the National Register of Historic Places in 1985.

The club is important in part for its association with the social history of Lyons. The Lyons Woman's Club was organized in 1928 and became a member of the Georgia Federation of Women's Clubs. It succeeded three clubs in Lyons: the United Daughters of the Confederacy, the Worth While Club, and the New Era Club. The new club was more effective and took on beneficial projects such as stamping out adult illiteracy.

It is also notable for association with architect William Walter Simmons, whose initial design for the building was to include Spanish revival style. The built design instead has a few elements of Georgian Revival architecture in its wrought iron, its parapet, and "round-marched" windows.

The W.W. Simmons & Son company also designed the NRHP-listed Warrenville Elementary School in South Carolina, and has been described as "an obscure architecture firm working out of Augusta, Georgia during the 1920s and active until 1951."
