= Warrenville Elementary School =

- U.S. National Register of Historic Places
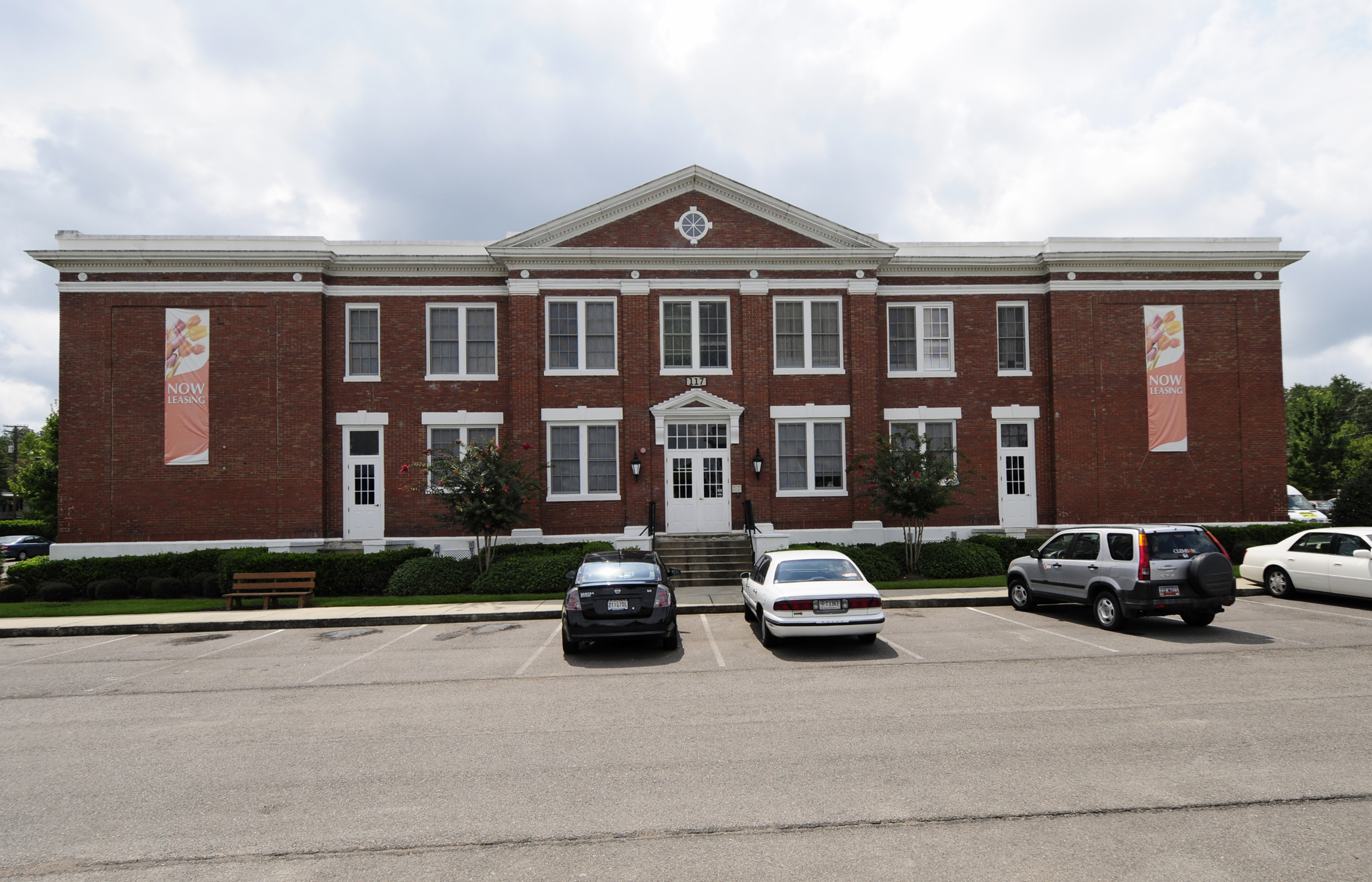

- Location within South Carolina
- Location: 115 Timmerman St., Warrenville, South Carolina
- Coordinates: 33°32′53″N 81°48′24″W
- Area: 4 acres (1.6 ha)
- Built: 1925; 101 years ago
- Architect: Simmons, William Walter & Son
- Architectural style: Late 19th And Early 20th Century American Movements
- NRHP reference No.: 02000560
- Added to NRHP: May 22, 2002

Warrenville Elementary School, originally known as Warrenville Graded School, was constructed in 1925 and used to educate mill village children located in and around the Warrenville, South Carolina, area. In 1954, two wings were added to the building. This Aiken County, South Carolina school was listed on the National Register of Historic Places on May 22, 2002.

William W. Simmons & Son are the architects who designed the school and six others in Aiken County, and have been described as "an obscure architecture firm working out of Augusta, Georgia during the 1920s and active until 1951." W.W. Simmons also designed the NRHP-listed Lyons Woman's Club House in Lyons, Georgia.
