= Camp Helen State Park =

State park in Florida, United States

- IUCN category IV (habitat/species management area)
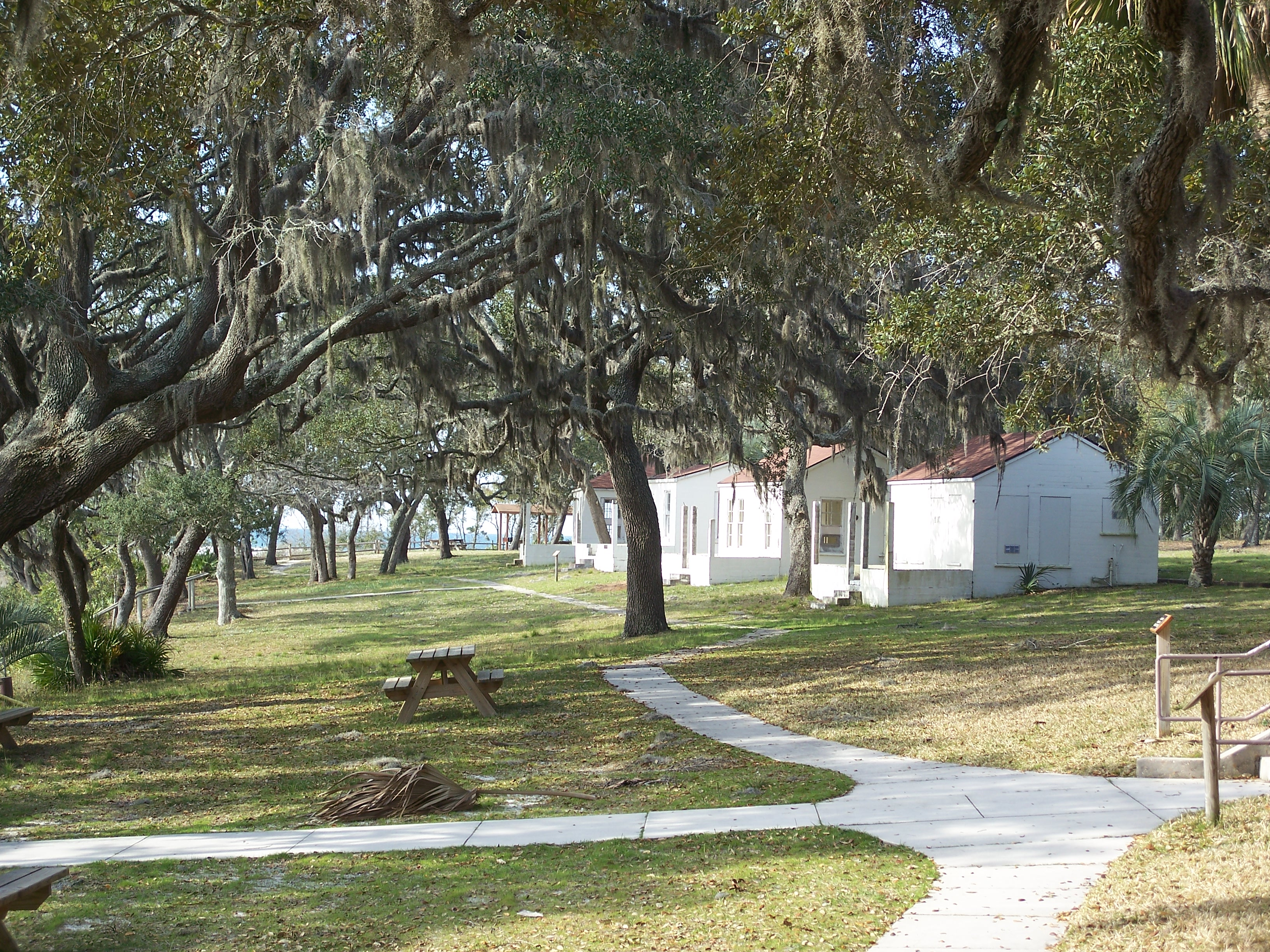

- Location within Florida Location within the United States
- Interactive map of Camp Helen State Park
- Location: Bay County, Florida, United States
- Nearest city: Panama City Beach, Florida
- Coordinates: 30°16′32.45″N 85°59′25.9″W
- Area: 189.93 acres (76.86 ha)
- Established: 1996; 30 years ago
- Governing body: Florida Department of Environmental Protection
- Camp Helen Historic District
- U.S. National Register of Historic Places
- NRHP reference No.: 12000298
- Added to NRHP: 24 May 2012

Camp Helen State Park is a Florida State Park and historic site located west of Panama City Beach, in northwestern Florida. The park is south of U.S. 98, and bounded by the Gulf of Mexico and Lake Powell, one of the largest coastal dune lakes in the state. The park was added to the National Register of Historic Places on May 24, 2012.

== History ==
Avondale Mills purchased the property in 1945 for use as an employee vacation camp, which opened in 1946. The company ended this use in 1987. Florida acquired Camp Helen in 1996 and opened it to the public as a state park in 1997.

== Recreational activities ==
The park has such amenities as beaches, birding, beachcombing, boating, canoeing, fishing, hiking, kayaking, picnicking areas, swimming and wildlife viewing.

It also has a visitor center and an interpretive exhibit. Camp Helen State Park spans over 180 acres.
