= Graniteville train crash =

2005 train crash in South Carolina, United States

Coordinates: 33°33′44″N 81°48′31″W

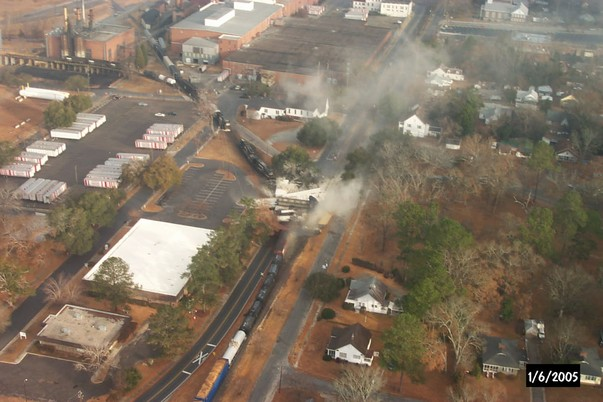

Details
- Date: January 6, 2005; 21 years ago 2:39 AM
- Location: Graniteville, South Carolina
- Country: United States
- Operator: Norfolk Southern Railway
- Incident type: Collision
- Cause: Incorrectly aligned railroad switch

Statistics
- Trains: 2
- Deaths: 10 (including 1 death from chlorine inhalation 3.5 months later)
- Injured: 250+

The Graniteville train crash was an American rail disaster that occurred on January 6, 2005, in Graniteville, South Carolina. At 2:39 am EST, two Norfolk Southern freight trains collided near the Avondale Mills plant in Graniteville. Nine people were killed and over 250 people were treated for toxic chlorine exposure. The crash was determined to be caused by a misaligned railroad switch.

== Crash ==
On January 5, 2005, NS local train P22 (led by GP59 #4622) began its daily operation. The regularly assigned conductor and engineer were both off duty on January 5, and the jobs were filled for the day from a list of available standby employees. At the end of their scheduled run, train P22's crew parked the train on a siding near the Avondale Mills plant. The train crew contacted the local train dispatcher at 7:53 and 7:54 p.m. Eastern Standard Time (EST) to clear two track warrants that were protecting train P22's use of the tracks. Although the railroad switch for the Avondale Mills siding was supposed to be set for mainline operation before P22's crew departed for the night, the train's brakeman later told the National Transportation Safety Board (NTSB) that he was "not 100 percent sure" he had aligned the switch for mainline operation, and that he "might have made a mistake." No train operated through the area or used the affected tracks for the rest of the day.

At 2:38 a.m. on January 6, NS freight train 192 (led by SD60s #6653 and #6593) approached Graniteville at approximately 48 mph (77 km/h). Train 192 entered emergency braking when the engineer saw the improperly aligned switch, but there was not sufficient distance for Train 192 to stop. At 2:39, Train 192 was diverted by the improperly lined switch onto the siding and collided with P22. The collision derailed both lead engines, sixteen of 192's forty-two freight cars, and one of P22's freight cars.

Train 192 was transporting chlorine gas, sodium hydroxide and cresol. One of 192's tank cars (loaded with 90 short tons (82 t) of chlorine) ruptured, releasing about 60 tons of the gas. About 30 percent of the load was recovered by industrial responders. Nine people died (eight at the time of the crash, one later as a result of chlorine inhalation), and at least 250 people were treated for chlorine exposure. In total, 5,400 residents within one mile (1.6 km) of the crash site were forced to evacuate for nearly two weeks while HAZMAT teams and cleanup crews decontaminated the area.

== Victims ==
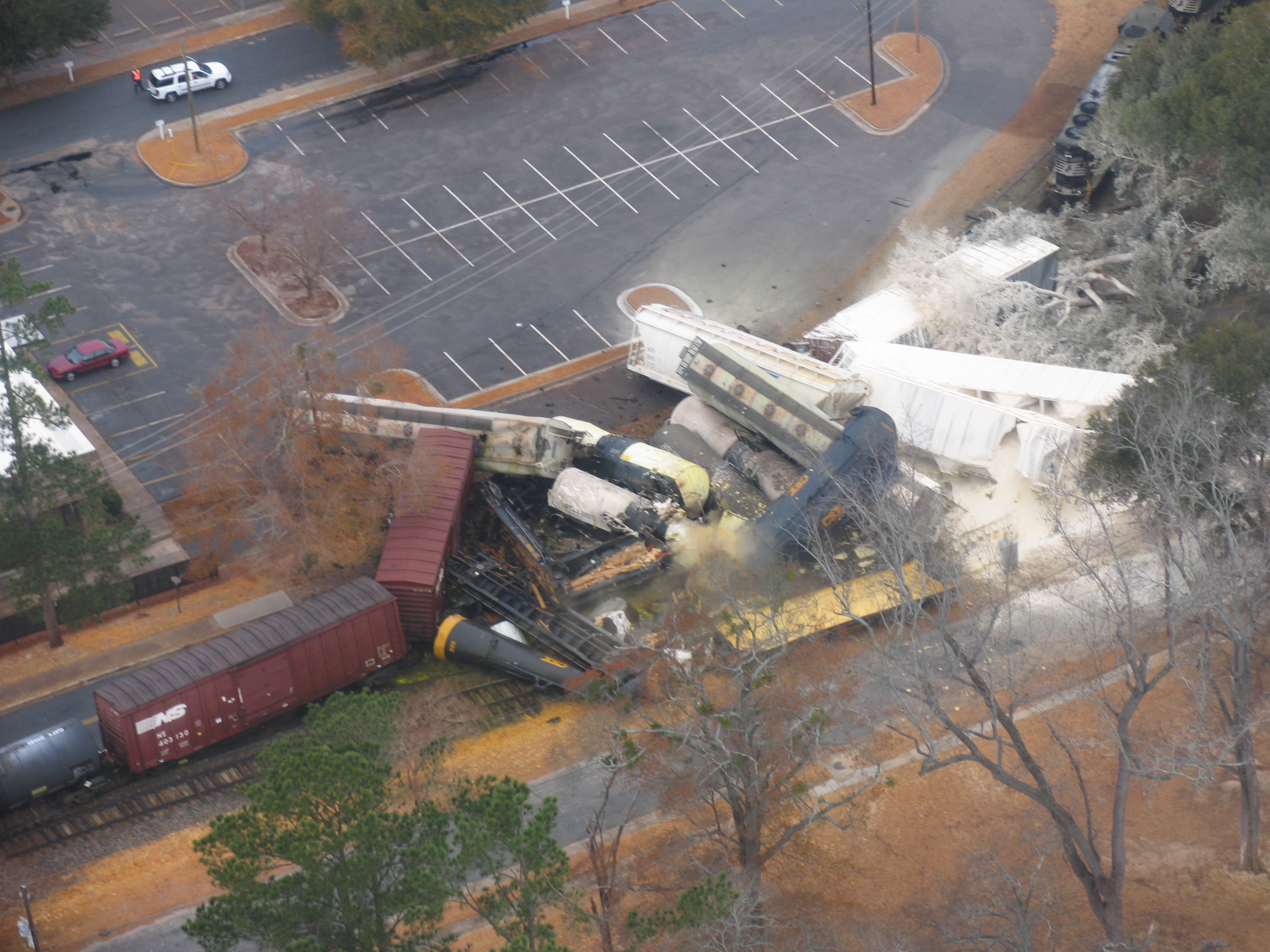
View of Graniteville Train Wreck in the morning after, from above

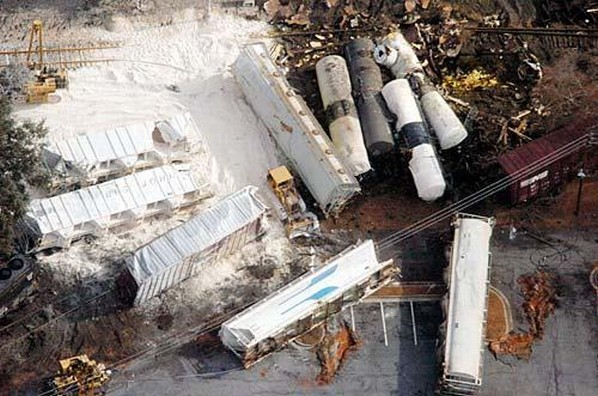
Aerial closeup of the crash scene

Nine people lost their lives in the Graniteville train disaster on the day of the crash:

- Christopher Seeling, 28, of West Columbia, South Carolina, engineer of NS train 192 (was found at the crash site and later died at the hospital);
- Willie C. Shealey, 43, of Graniteville, employee of Avondale Mills Inc. (was found in the wooded area near the Woodhead Division of Avondale Mills Inc.);
- Willie L. Tyler, 57, of Graniteville, employee of Avondale Mills Inc. (was found about 25 feet inside the entrance to the Woodhead Division of Avondale Mills Inc. and later died at the hospital);
- John Laird, 24, of North Augusta, South Carolina, employee of Avondale Mills Inc. (was also found in the wooded area near the Woodhead Division of Avondale Mills Inc.);
- Fred "Rusty" Rushton III, 41, of Warrenville, South Carolina, employee of Avondale Mills Inc. (was found on the loading dock of the Stevens Steam Plant, owned by Avondale Mills Inc.);
- Steven Bagby, 38, of Augusta, Georgia, employee of Avondale Mills Inc. (was found in a break area in the Gregg Division of Avondale Mills Inc.);
- Allen Frazier, 58, of Ridge Spring, South Carolina, employee of Avondale Mills Inc. (was found in an office in the Gregg Division of Avondale Mills Inc.);
- Joseph L. Stone, 22, of Quebec, Canada, an employee of JW Express Trucking Company (was found in the truck's sleeper cab); and
- Tony DeLoach, 56, of Graniteville, South Carolina (was found in his home on Main Street near the train wreck).

On April 21, 2005, one more death was attributed to the crash. Leonard Mathis, a brick mason in Graniteville, was driving home from a convenience store just after the crash occurred. As he was traveling home, he passed through a portion of the chlorine cloud that resulted from the collision. His health deteriorated from that point on.

== Economic consequences ==
Norfolk Southern announced that it expected the disaster to cost between $US 30 and $40 million, including the corporation's self-insurance retention under its insurance policies and other uninsured costs, but not any fines or penalties that might be imposed.

On May 25, 2005, lawyers involved in the damages claims against Norfolk Southern announced that they had reached a preliminary agreement on settlements for area residents and business that were evacuated but did not seek medical attention. In this preliminary settlement, Norfolk Southern would offer each resident who was evacuated and did not seek medical attention within 72 hours of the accident a flat amount of $2,000 for the evacuation plus $200 per person per day of the evacuation. These amounts are separate from any property damage claims. Claims that involve injury or death are not included in this settlement, but are still being negotiated.

On May 22, 2006, Avondale Mills' CEO, Robert Williams Sr., announced that his firm would close all its plants, corporate and sales offices no later than July 25, throwing more than 4,000 workers across four states out of work. Mr. Felker cited the 2005 derailment as the primary reasons for the company's failure. The wreck knocked out the Gregg plant of Avondale Mills, which was a key pillar to the survival of the company in a shrinking United States textile market. The plant accounted for 40% of the company's sales. Stephen Felker Jr., Avondale's manager of corporate development stated, "We were prepared to weather the storm of global competition. What we weren't prepared for was an event such as this derailment, which was completely beyond our control." Avondale Mills Inc. reached a $215 million settlement with its insurance company for damages caused by the train derailment and fatal chemical spill.

Graniteville residents assumed that since the plant would have been fully insured and/or covered by Norfolk Southern's accident insurance, that the owners chose to take the settlement money and leave rather than rebuild the damaged plant. However, G. Stephen Felker Sr. stated "We do not believe that the settlement fully compensates us for the full value of the losses incurred as a result of the Norfolk Southern derailment" and said that the company intends to pursue a lawsuit or seek a settlement against Norfolk Southern. That suit ended with another settlement, for an undisclosed sum.

== Findings and recommendations ==
On November 29, 2005, the NTSB issued a report officially blaming the crash on the P22 train crew's failure to reline the switch for mainline operations. The report concluded that neither equipment failure nor crew fatigue or drug or alcohol use was a factor in the crash. It further concluded that the level and immediacy of emergency response to the crash was wholly appropriate for the situation.

As a result of this crash and a similar derailment on the Burlington Northern and Santa Fe Railway on January 8, 2005, the United States Federal Railroad Administration (FRA) released to railroads a reminder of federal regulations on procedures for turnout operation and safety procedures. Among the federal rules regarding turnouts are:

- The normal position for turnouts on mainline tracks is for mainline through traffic.
- When trains are required to clear the mainline track, they will not report that the track is clear until there are no obstructions on the mainline track and all turnouts are set for the mainline position and locked in place.

The FRA further recommended that railroads should:

- ensure that their internal regulations include adequate safety procedures regarding turnout position.
- implement a paper trail to ensure adequate inspection of turnout position before a mainline track is declared cleared.

== Litigation ==
Avondale Mills filed suit against Norfolk Southern claiming that the railroad was negligent in its operations through Graniteville and that this alleged negligence was the root cause of the crash. After the crash, Avondale Mills was closed, laying off thousands of employees and paid more than $140 million on cleanup and repair expenses. The trial opened on March 10, 2008, in federal court in Columbia, South Carolina.

On April 7, 2008, Norfolk Southern and interests representing Avondale Mills, and its surviving entities, reached a confidential out of court settlement.

On April 24, 2008, Norfolk Southern was sued by the U.S. EPA for violations of the Clean Water Act, as Horse Creek had been polluted. In a similar lawsuit in Pennsylvania, where a derailed Norfolk Southern runaway train crashed, the state of Pennsylvania sued the railroad for similar violations and won several million dollars for environmental remediation. However, fines may be minimal when compared to the damage to the surrounding environment.

On March 8, 2010, Norfolk Southern Railway Company agreed to pay $4 million penalty to resolve alleged violations of the Clean Water Act (CWA) and hazardous materials laws for a 2005 chlorine spill in Graniteville, S.C. Under the settlement filed in federal court in Columbia, S.C., Norfolk Southern will be required to pay a civil penalty of $3,967,500 for the alleged CWA violations, to be deposited in the federal Oil Spill Liability Trust Fund. The alleged CWA violations, included in an amended complaint filed in March 2009, are for the discharge of tons of chlorine, a hazardous substance, from a derailed train tank car and thousands of gallons of diesel fuel from ruptured locomotive engine fuel tanks. For the alleged Comprehensive Environmental Response, Compensation, and Liability Act (CERCLA) violation for failure to immediately notify the National Response Center of the chlorine release, Norfolk Southern will pay a penalty of $32,500, to be deposited in the Hazardous Substance Superfund. Under the terms of the agreement, Norfolk Southern will provide incident command system training to environmental and transportation personnel; stock nearby Langley Pond with at least 3,000 fish to replace fish killed by the chlorine spill; and post the telephone number for the National Response Center to facilitate spill reporting. Further, the settlement includes a supplemental environmental project (SEP) valued at $100,000 to plant vegetation along the banks of Horse Creek to decrease erosion and sedimentation, thereby improving water quality in Horse Creek.

== Related information ==
On May 24, 2005, Norfolk Southern was awarded the TRANSCAER National Achievement Award for 2004. TRANSCAER is an acronym for Transportation Community Awareness and Emergency Response, which aims to promote emergency preparedness among first responders and communities for crashes that involve chemical releases. Part of the reasons for NS's selection for this award were the emergency preparedness training that the railroad held in 18 of the 22 states through which the railroad transports hazardous materials.

Texas folk artist Doug Burr memorialized the Graniteville crash in his song "Graniteville" in his 2007 released album On Promenade. The song is fictionalized account of a husband attempting to rouse his wife from sleep to escape the dangers of the chemical spill. NS 6653, the lead engine of 192 that day, was repaired and later rebuilt as an SD60E bearing the number 6900.
