= Bath, South Carolina =

Unincorporated community in South Carolina, US

- Census-designated place and Unincorporated community
- Location within South Carolina
- Coordinates: 33°30′16″N 81°52′08″W
- Country: United States
- State: South Carolina
- County: Aiken

Population (2010)
  - Total: 1,033
- Time zone: UTC-5 (Eastern (EST))
  - Summer (DST): UTC-4 (EDT)
- ZIP code: 29816
- Area codes: 803, 839
- GNIS feature ID: 1231033

Bath is an unincorporated community in Aiken County, South Carolina, United States. The community is located in the Horse Creek Valley, and its zip code is 29816. It is part of the Augusta, Georgia metropolitan area.

== History ==
The community's name most likely is a transfer from Bath, England.

In 1925, Bath had 500 inhabitants.
