= Graniteville, South Carolina =

- Census-designated place
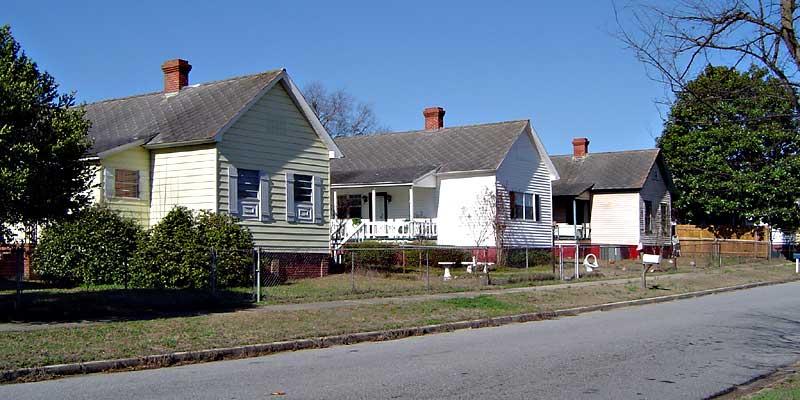
- Mill houses in Graniteville

- Location within South Carolina
- Coordinates: 33°33′53″N 81°48′28″W
- Country: United States
- State: South Carolina
- County: Aiken
- Founded: 1845; 181 years ago
- Named for: Use of blue granite in construction of the original buildings

Area
  - Total: 3.32 sq mi (8.61 km^{2})
  - Land: 3.31 sq mi (8.56 km^{2})
  - Water: 0.019 sq mi (0.05 km^{2})
- Elevation: 230 ft (70 m)

Population (2020)
  - Total: 2,439
  - Density: 737.6/sq mi (284.79/km^{2})
- Time zone: UTC-5 (Eastern (EST))
  - Summer (DST): UTC-4 (EDT)
- ZIP code: 29829
- FIPS code: 45-30265
- GNIS feature ID: 2629830

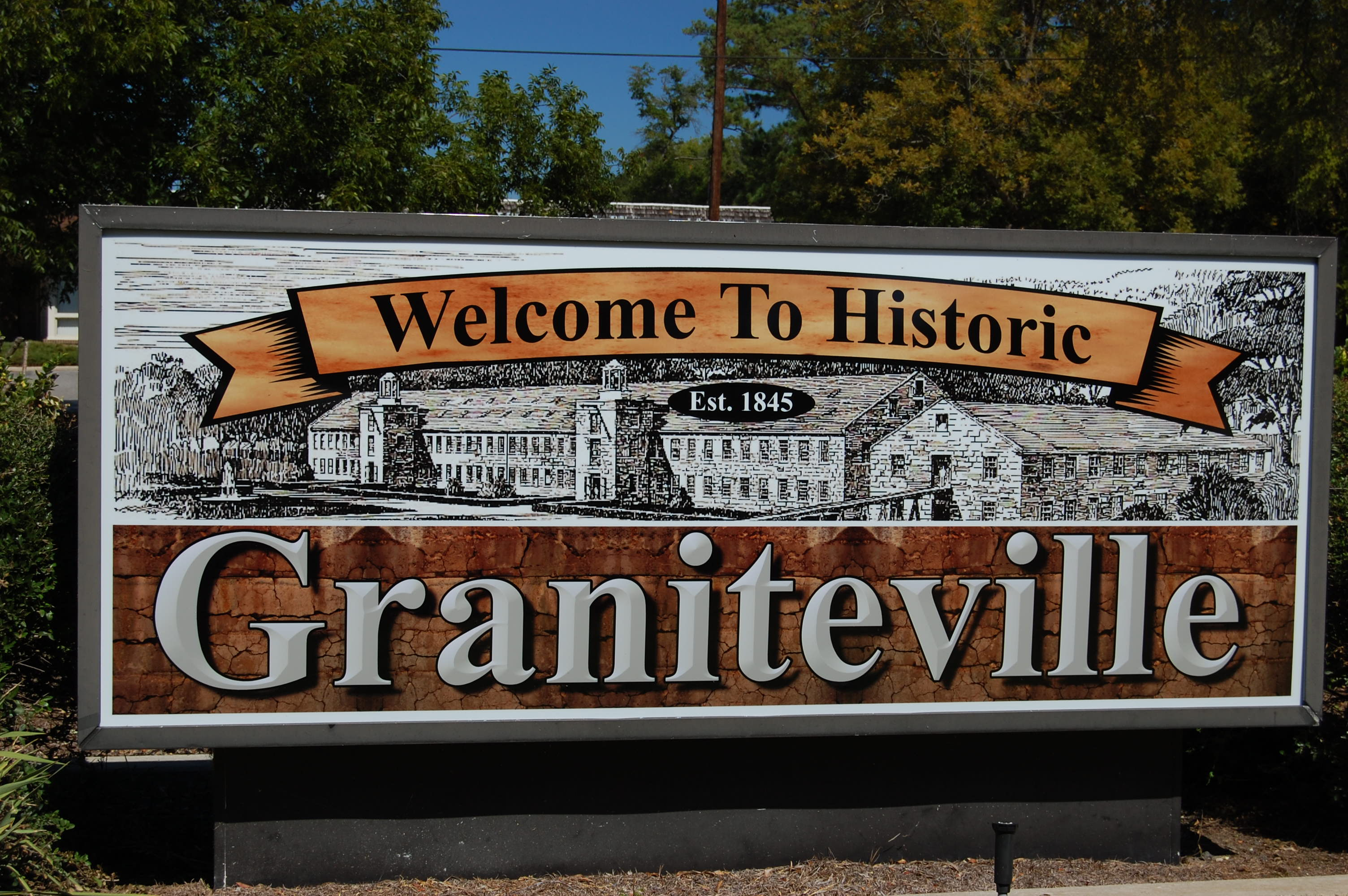
Graniteville welcome sign

Graniteville is a census-designated place (CDP) in Aiken County, South Carolina, United States. The population was 2,614 at the 2010 census. It lies along U.S. Route 1, five miles (8.0 km) west of Aiken in Horse Creek Valley, which originates in the nearby town of Vaucluse.

Graniteville is part of the Augusta, Georgia metropolitan area, also known as the C.S.R.A. or Central Savannah River Area.

== History ==
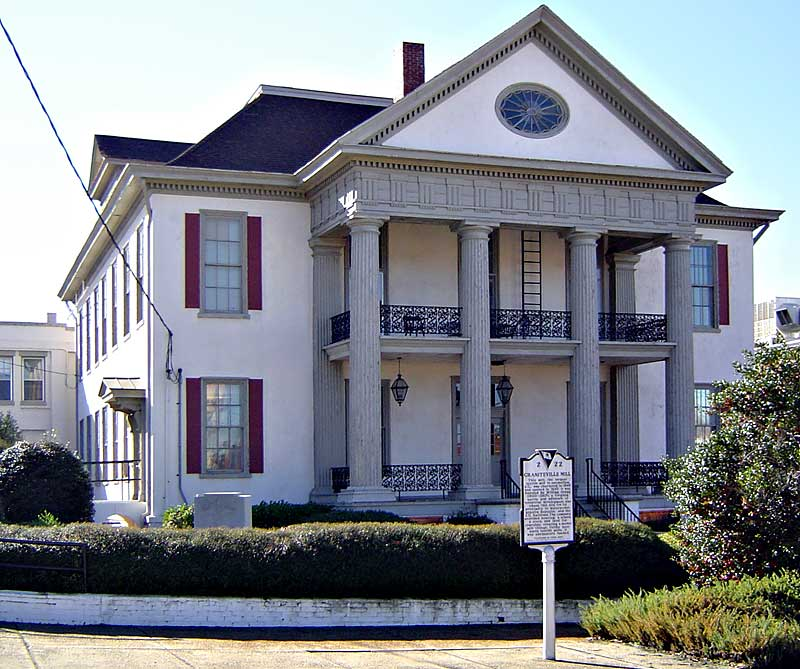
Old Graniteville Mill headquarters

Graniteville dates back to 1845 when William Gregg built the South's first large-scale cotton mill in what became known as Graniteville. His paternalistic mill town included 90 homes, several boarding houses, six stores, two churches, and a school for the mill workers and their families. The community got its name because most of those original buildings were constructed of blue granite. Gregg required the children of mill workers to attend the public school he instituted, and violators were fined. As such, Graniteville holds the distinction of having the first compulsory education system in the Southern United States.

The Graniteville Historic District was listed on the National Register of Historic Places in 1978.

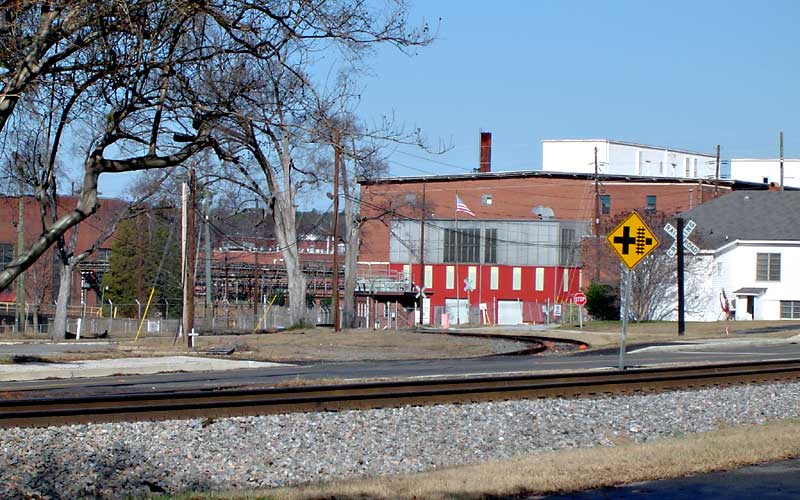
Site of derailment at Graniteville, South Carolina

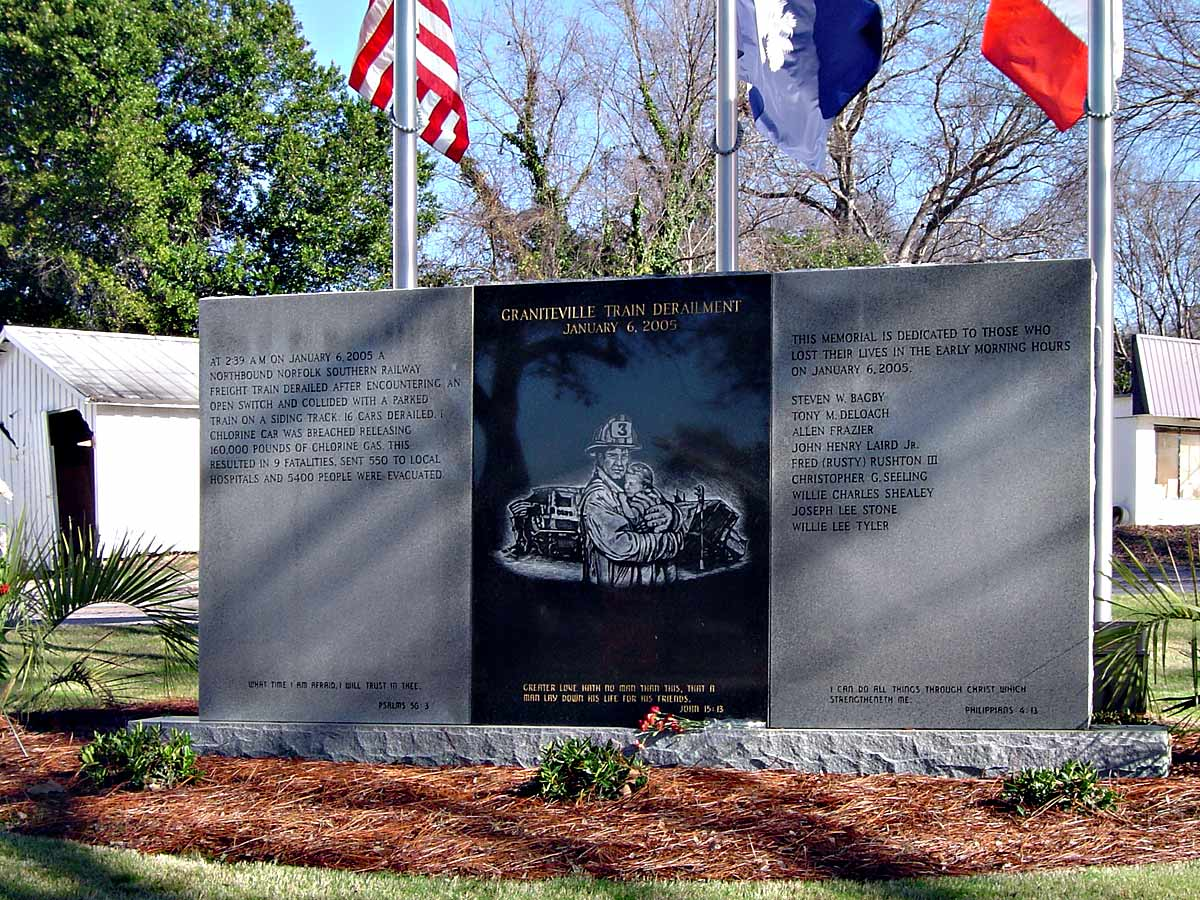
Monument to the crash's victims

On January 6, 2005, a Norfolk Southern Railway freight train struck a parked train on the spur leading to Avondale's Stevens Steam Plant. One of two train cars that were carrying liquid chlorine ruptured, releasing a poisonous chlorine cloud. Nine people were killed, more than 550 injured, and more than 5,400 were displaced from their homes for more than a week. The town built a memorial in a small park at the intersection of Canal Street and Aiken Road, and on May 20, 2006, the memorial was dedicated to the people who died in the crash.

In 2008, there were talks about incorporating the villages of Graniteville, Vaucluse, and Warrenville; as a result, the towns approved a referendum to vote on whether or not to incorporate. If approved, the municipality would have had an area of around 20 square miles (52 km^{2}). The referendum was defeated by a two-to-one margin in August 2008.

== Economy ==
Until 1996, Graniteville was the home office and central location of a collection of textile plants in South Carolina and Georgia known as The Graniteville Company. In 1996, the company was bought out by Avondale Mills, a company which was one of the largest denim manufacturers in the United States. Avondale closed or sold off all of its plants in the area in 2006, unable to recover financially from the train accident in 2005. Graniteville is also home to a Bridgestone/Firestone Tire and Rubber Company plant.

A continuing legacy of The Graniteville Company is the Gregg-Graniteville Foundation, which was established by the company in 1941 in honor of Mr. Gregg. To continue his concern for people, the Foundation awards annual college scholarships and other charitable contributions. Gregg Park Civic Center, a recreational complex, has services offered to community residents at a nominal charge. The Foundation funds the complex which includes a walking track, softball and baseball fields, tennis courts, swimming area, picnic area. The gym includes a basketball court, weight room, exercise room, racquetball courts, locker rooms and showers.

== Demographics ==
Historical population
Census	Pop.	Note	%±
2010	2,614		—
2020	2,439		−6.7%
U.S. Decennial Census

=== 2020 census ===
Graniteville racial composition
Race	Num.	Perc.
White (non-Hispanic)	1,441	59.08%
Black or African American (non-Hispanic)	632	25.91%
Native American	12	0.49%
Asian	14	0.57%
Pacific Islander	1	0.04%
Other/Mixed	95	3.9%
Hispanic or Latino	244	10.0%

As of the 2020 United States census, there were 2,439 people, 1,220 households, and 810 families residing in the CDP.

=== 2010 census ===
As of 2010, the total population of the CDP was 2,614. 0.65% American Indian and Alaska Native, 0.04% were Asian, 28.62% were African American, 0.08% were Native Hawaiian or other Pacific Islander, 65.26% were white, 2.83% were some other race, and 2.52% were of two or more races. People of Hispanic or Latino origin (of any race) were 5.93% of the population.

Males were 47.59% of the population, and females were 52.41%. The age distribution of the population was 9.45% under 5 years of age, 18.06% 5 to 17 years, 57.46% 18 to 64 years, and 15.03% age 65 and over.

== Education ==
It is in the Aiken County Public School District. Zoned schools in areas are New Elementary School, Leavelle McCampbell Middle School, and Midland Valley High School.

Aiken Technical College is the only community college located in the area.
