= Vaucluse, South Carolina =

Unincorporated community in South Carolina, U.S.

- Census-designated place and Unincorporated community
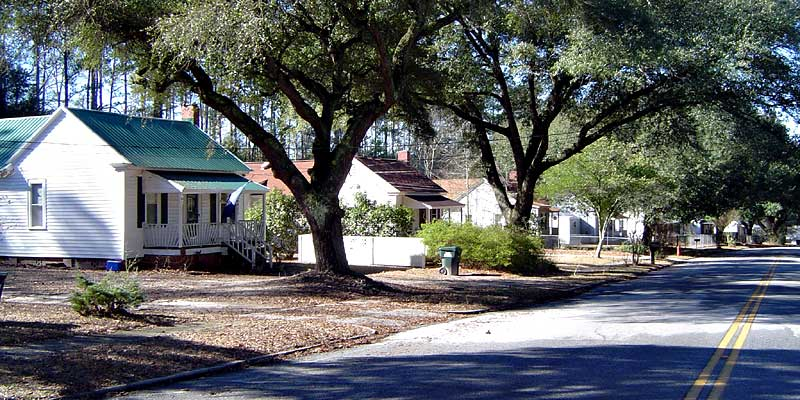
- Vaucluse mill houses in January 2007

- Location within South Carolina
- Coordinates: 33°36′45″N 81°48′35″W
- Country: United States
- State: South Carolina
- County: Aiken

Population (2010)
  - Total: 111
- Time zone: UTC-5 (Eastern (EST))
  - Summer (DST): UTC-4 (EDT)
- ZIP code: 29850
- Area codes: 803, 839
- GNIS feature ID: 1251291

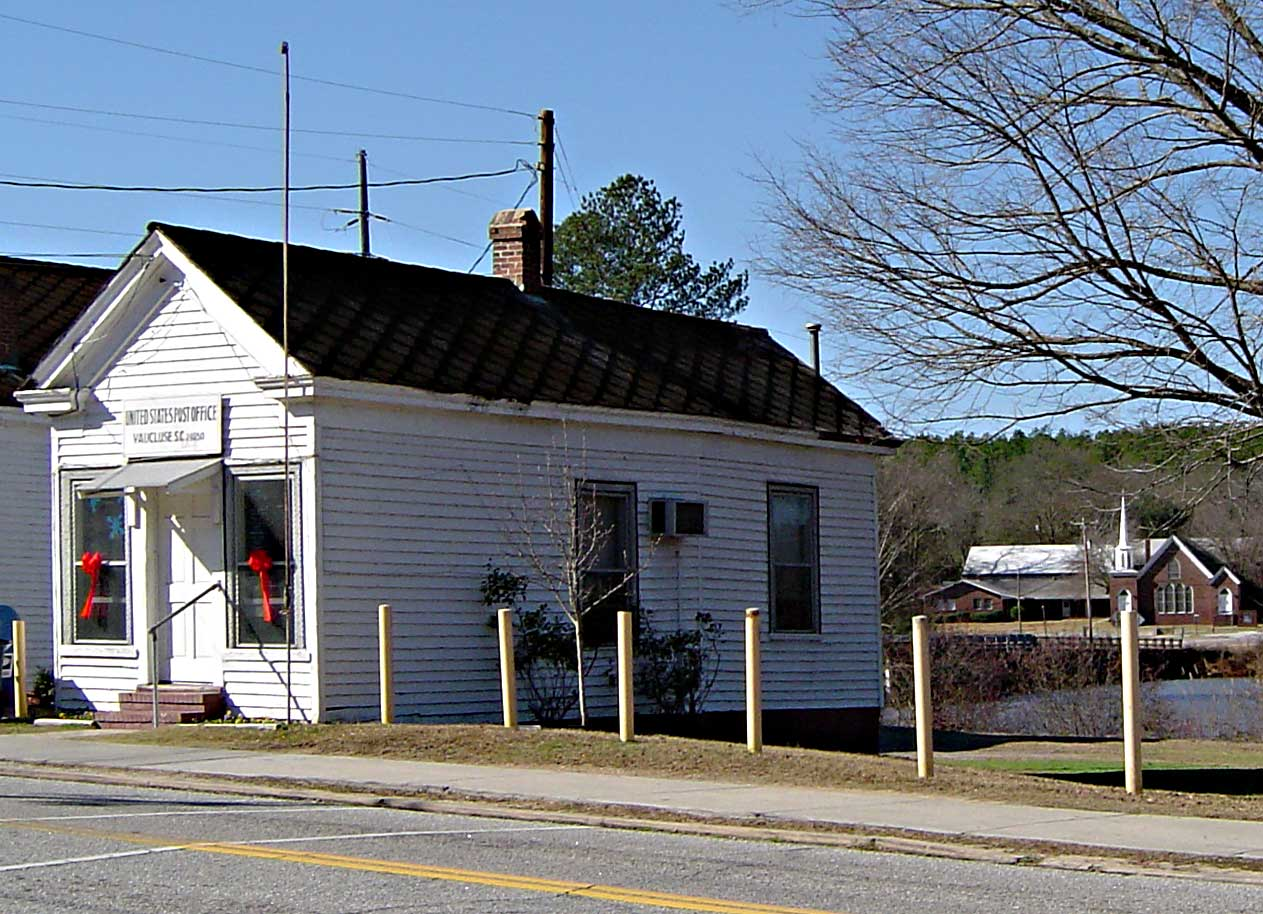
A U.S. Post Office at Vaucluse, South Carolina, in January 2007. This and two adjacent buildings appear on the 1904 Sanborn Fire Insurance map

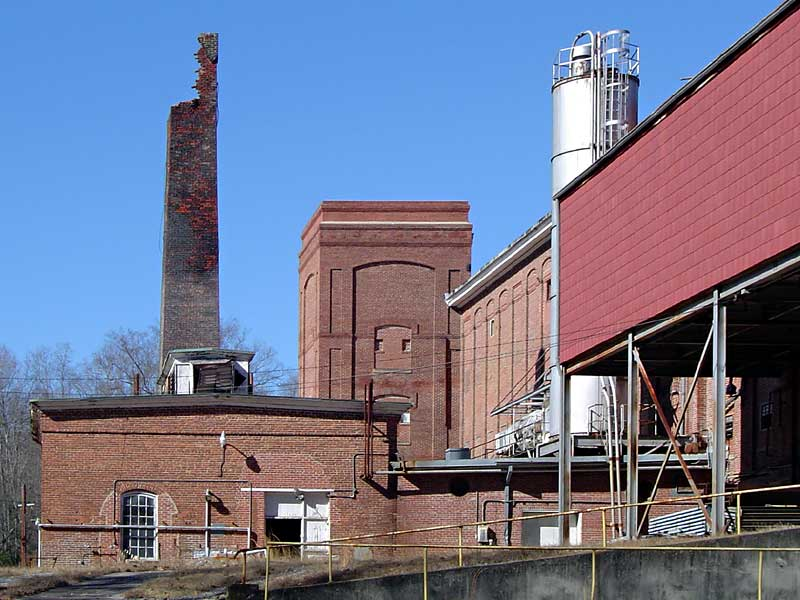
The remains of a textile mill at Vaucluse, South Carolina in January 2007.

Vaucluse is an unincorporated community in Aiken County in the U.S. state of South Carolina.

== History ==
Three miles from Graniteville and 6 miles (9.7 km) from Aiken, Vaucluse is the site of the pioneering Horse Creek Valley textile mill. Employing 50 'operatives' on 1500 spindles and 25 looms, the mill was incorporated by local planter Christian Breithaupt in 1833, with later investors George McDuffie, John Bauskett, and William Gregg. Gregg found it under-capitalized and too small for economic survival, producing an unmanageable variety of products, and suffering due to a lack of active management. As such it served Gregg as a training ground for his successful Graniteville project of 1847.

Gregg observed 'the most indifferent overseer's house in Lowell, Massachusetts, at least such as I saw, cost more than the whole village of Vaucluse, containing upwards of 200 inhabitants including a comfortable dwelling recently built as a residence for one of its owners'. The existing mill building ca. 1880 employed 300 operators on 10,000 spindles under ownership of the Graniteville Company until its recent closure. The Vaucluse Mill Village Historic District is on the National Register of Historic Places.

== Incorporation ==
There have been talks about incorporating the villages of Graniteville, Vaucluse, and, Warrenville, recently, the towns approved a referendum to vote on whether or not to incorporate. If approved, the municipality would be around 20 sq. miles. Vaucluse has been the only one of the towns where a significant proportion of the population is against the incorporation. Many cite the fact that it would only include half of the village (the proposed municipal limits have to have a population density of three hundred, and using the other half of the village would make it impossible to incorporate)
