= Warrenville, South Carolina =

- Census-designated place
- Location in South Carolina
- Coordinates: 33°32′46″N 81°47′56″W
- Country: United States
- State: South Carolina
- County: Aiken

Area
  - Total: 1.09 sq mi (2.83 km^{2})
  - Land: 1.08 sq mi (2.81 km^{2})
  - Water: 0.0077 sq mi (0.02 km^{2})
- Elevation: 390 ft (120 m)

Population (2020)
  - Total: 1,134
  - Density: 1,045.7/sq mi (403.74/km^{2})
- Time zone: UTC-5 (Eastern (EST))
  - Summer (DST): UTC-4 (EDT)
- ZIP code: 29851
- Area codes: 803 and 839
- FIPS code: 45-74725
- GNIS feature ID: 2629840

Warrenville is a census-designated place (CDP) in Aiken County, South Carolina, United States. The population was 1,233 at the 2010 census. It is located just south of Graniteville and is part of the Augusta, Georgia metropolitan area. Warrenville is located in historic Horse Creek Valley.

== History ==
In 2008, there were talks about incorporating the villages of Warrenville, Graniteville, and Vaucluse; as a result, the towns approved a referendum to vote on whether or not to incorporate. If approved, the municipality would have had an area of around 20 square miles (52 km^{2}). The referendum was defeated by a two-to-one margin in August 2008.

The Warrenville Elementary School was listed on the National Register of Historic Places in 2002.

== Demographics ==
Historical population
Census	Pop.	Note	%±
2010	1,233		—
2020	1,134		−8.0%
U.S. Decennial Census

The Demographics of the CDP as of 2010 were as follows: Counts Percentages Total Population 1,233 100.00%

Population by Race: American Indian and Alaska native alone 11 (0.89%) Asian alone 3 (0.24%) Black or African American alone 66 (5.35%) Native Hawaiian and Other Pacific native alone 0 (0.0%) Some other race alone 50 (4.06%) Two or more races 45 (3.65%) White alone 1,058 (85.81%)

Population by Hispanic or Latino Origin: (of any race) Persons of Hispanic or Latino Origin 84 (6.81%) Persons Not of Hispanic or Latino Origin 1,149 (93.19%)

Population by Gender Male 580 (47.04%) Female 653 (52.96%)

Population by Age Persons 0 to 4 years 65 (5.27%) Persons 5 to 17 years 205 (16.63%) Persons 18 to 64 years 732 (59.37%) Persons 65 years and over 231 (18.73%)

== Education ==
All parts of Aiken County are in the Aiken County Public School District. Zoned schools are Warrenville Elementary School, LBC Middle School, and Midland Valley High School.

Warrenville has a public library, a branch of the ABBE Regional Library System.
