= Midland Valley High School =

Location
- 227 Mustang Drive; Graniteville, South Carolina 29829; United States; 33°31′32″N 81°51′57″W

Information
- School type: Public school
- Founded: 1980 (46 years ago)
- School district: Aiken County Public School District
- CEEB code: 411257
- Principal: Sheldon Higgenbottom
- Teaching staff: 88.00 (FTE)
- Grades: 9–12
- Enrollment: 1,558 (2024–2025)
- Student to teacher ratio: 17.70
- Hours in school day: 8:20 am – 3:30 pm
- Colors: Blue and orange
- Mascot: Mustang
- Yearbook: The Mustang
- Website: www.acpsd.net/o/mvhs

Midland Valley High School (MVHS) is a four-year high school located in Graniteville, South Carolina, United States. It is part of the Aiken County Public School District and is home of the Mustangs.

== History ==
Midland Valley was founded in 1980 as the merger of two other schools, Langley Bath Clearwater and Leavelle McCampbell. Those schools became middle schools. MVHS celebrated its first graduating class in 1981.

== Athletics ==
=== State championships ===
- Baseball: 1997
- Boys Basketball: 2015
