= Aiken County Public School District =

School district in South Carolina, United States

Address
- 1000 Brookhaven Drive Aiken, Aiken County, South Carolina; United States

District information
- Grades: PreK–12
- Superintendent: Corey Murphy
- Asst. superintendent(s): Julie Revelle; (elementary schools); Eric Jeffcoat; (elementary schools); Phyllis Gamble; (middle schools); Berkeley Postell; (high schools); Beth Taylor; (special programs)
- Schools: 41
- NCES District ID: 4500720

Students and staff
- Students: 23,102
- Teachers: 1,586.9
- Student–teacher ratio: 14.56 FTE

Other information
- Website: www.acpsd.net

Aiken County Public School District (ACPSD), also known as Consolidated School District of Aiken County, Aiken County School District or Aiken County Public Schools is a school district headquartered in Aiken, South Carolina.

It is the only school district covering sections of Aiken County, and it covers the majority of the county. Additionally, it covers portions of Saluda County, where it includes that county's portion of Monetta, as well as Ridge Spring and Ward.

The remaining portion of Aiken County is not in any school district. The 2010 U.S. census stated that this portion was in "School District Not Defined". That undefined portion corresponds with the Savannah River Site.

== History ==
In 1964, the district began gradually desegregating following the Brown v. Board of Education decision. The 1970-1971 school year was the first with fully integrated classes at Schofield Middle School and Aiken High School.

In 2019 the district's population was increasing. In 2018 the district held a referendum to enact a bond to build new schools, and the referendum was approved. As a result, the district planned to build and/or renovate 15 schools.

King Laurence was superintendent until the end of the 2023–2024 school year. Laurence had retired from his career. Corey Murphy became the new superintendent starting the 2024–2025 school year. The handover occurred on July 1, 2024.

== Schools ==
=== Middle and high schools ===
- Ridge Spring-Monetta Middle-High School

=== High schools ===
- Aiken County Career & Technology Center
- Aiken High School
- Aiken Scholars Academy
- Midland Valley High School
- North Augusta High School
- Silver Bluff High School
- South Aiken High School
- Wagener-Salley High School

=== Middle schools ===
- Aiken Intermediate School
- A.L. Corbett Middle School
- Highland Springs Middle School
  - In 2024 it had about 700 students. The facility was built with money from a 2018 bond and opened in fall 2023, though its ribbon cutting ceremony happened in spring 2024.
- Jackson STEM Magnet Middle School
- Kennedy Middle School
- Paul Knox Middle School
- Langley-Bath-Clearwater Middle School
- Leavelle McCampbell Middle School
- New Ellenton Middle STEAM Magnet School
- North Augusta Middle School
- Schofield Middle School

=== Elementary schools ===
- Aiken Elementary School
- Belvedere Elementary School
- Byrd Elementary School
- Cyril B. Busbee Elementary School
- Chukker Creek Elementary School
- Clearwater Elementary School
- East Aiken School of the Arts
- Gloverville Elementary School
- Graniteville Elementary School
- Greendale Elementary School
- Hammond Hill Elementary School
- Jefferson Elementary School
- J.D. Lever Elementary School
- Millbrook Elementary School
- Mossy Creek Elementary School
- North Aiken Elementary School
- North Augusta Elementary School
- Oakwood-Windsor Elementary School
- Redcliffe Elementary School
- Ridge Spring-Monetta Elementary School
- Warrenville Elementary School
