= William Aiken House =

William Aiken House may refer to:

- Gov. William Aiken House, a Charleston, South Carolina home of South Carolina governor William Aiken, Jr.
- William Aiken House and Associated Railroad Structures, includes the Charleston, South Carolina home of railway founder William Aiken, Sr., father of the governor
