= Governor Aiken =

Governor Aiken may refer to:

- George Aiken (1892–1984), Governor of Vermont
- William Aiken Jr. (1806–1887), Governor of South Carolina
