= 1855–56 Speaker of the United States House of Representatives election =

Organization of 68th U.S. Congress

- December 3, 1855 to February 2, 1856

Needed to win: First ballot: 225 votes cast, 113 needed for majority 133rd ballot: 214 votes cast, plurality needed
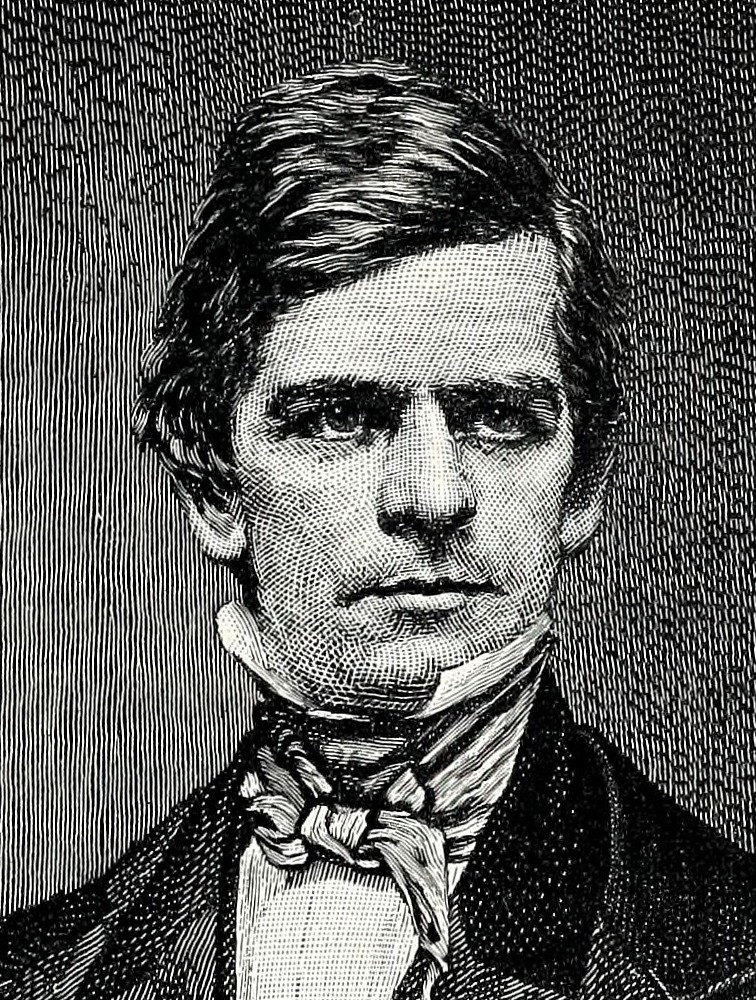

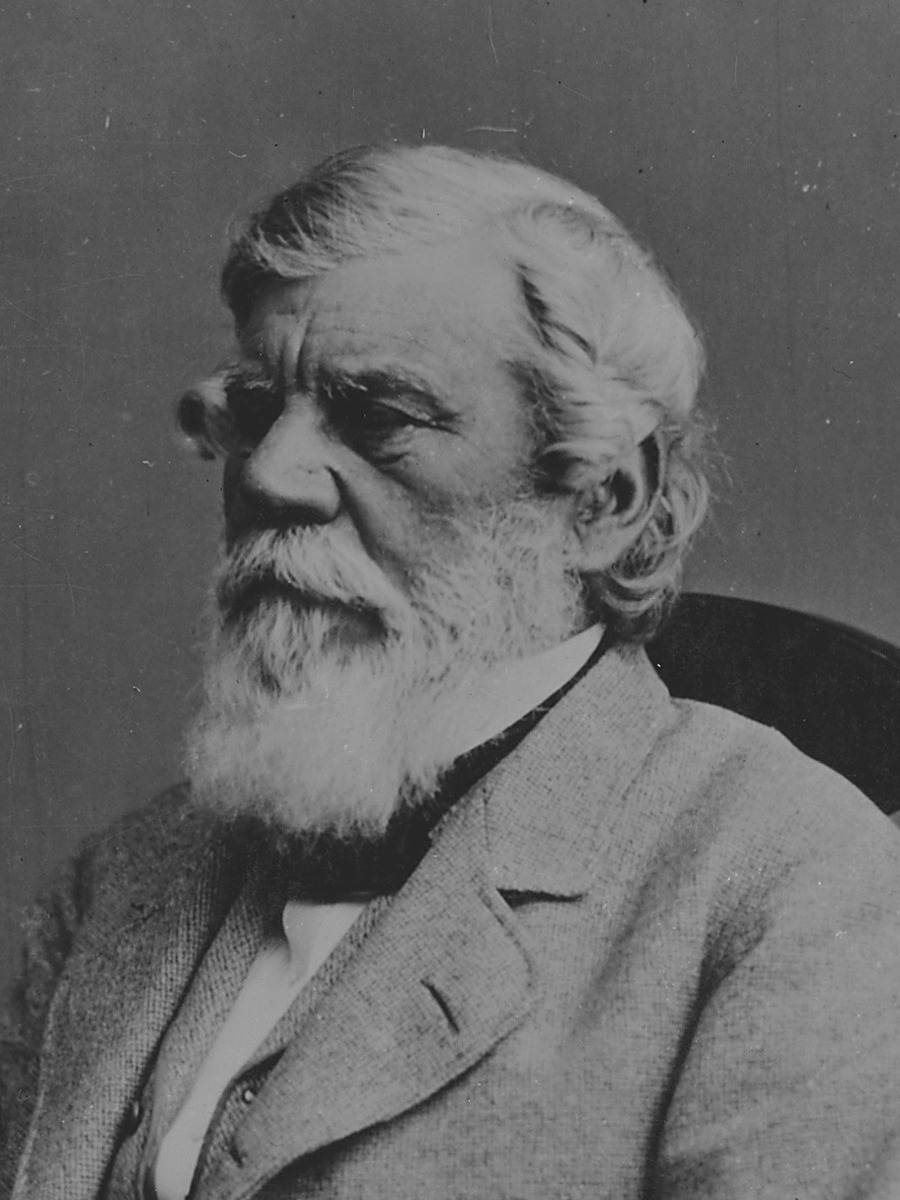
	Majority party	Minority party
Candidate	Nathaniel P. Banks	William Aiken Jr.
Party	Opposition (N)	Democratic
Alliance	Republican; Free Soil; Anti-Nebraska; North American	Opposition (S); American
Seat	Massachusetts 7th	South Carolina 2nd
First ballot	21 (9.3%)	—
Final ballot	103 (48.1%)	100 (46.7%)
Speaker before election
Linn Boyd
Democratic
Elected Speaker
Nathaniel Prentiss Banks
Opposition (N)

From December 3, 1855, to February 2, 1856, the incoming House of Representatives held an election for speaker of the U.S. House of Representatives. After one hundred and thirty-two inconclusive ballots, Nathaniel Prentiss Banks of Massachusetts was elected over William Aiken Jr. of South Carolina pursuant to a temporary rule permitting a candidate to be elected with a plurality of the vote. The election was dominated by debate over slavery and the Kansas-Nebraska Act, and contemporary reaction recognized Banks's victory as the first "Northern victory" in the events leading to the American Civil War.

Following the 1854–55 United States House of Representatives elections, opponents of the incumbent Franklin Pierce administration won a large majority of the seats in the House. However, the anti-administration representatives-elect, grouped together informally as the "Opposition," had little common ground and no common party organization. Five Opposition candidates were formally nominated, but the race soon coalesced around two Opposition figures, Nathaniel P. Banks of Massachusetts and Henry Mills Fuller of Pennsylvania, against Democratic nominee William Alexander Richardson. Banks gained the formal nomination of the Opposition but repeatedly fell short of a majority of the House as many members of the Opposition, primarily Southern nativists or anti-abolitionists, cast their votes for Fuller or other Opposition candidates. On the final day of balloting, members of Democratic minority agreed to the use of plurality voting, having settled on South Carolina unionist William Aiken Jr. as a compromise candidate who could win the votes of the southern Opposition. On the final ballot, Aiken gained most of the dissident Opposition votes but fell three short of Banks.

As of 2026, this remains the longest election for speaker in the history of the United States House, both in terms of ballots and duration, and a record 135 people received votes. Banks remains one of only two Speakers, with Howell Cobb in 1849, elected by plurality.

== Background ==
=== Kansas-Nebraska Act ===
In May 1854, the 33rd Congress passed the Kansas–Nebraska Act with support from President Franklin Pierce, Senator Stephen Douglas of Illinois, and pro-slavery Democratic members of the House. The Act repealed the 1820 Missouri Compromise and the Compromise of 1850 by establishing a path to statehood for the territories of Kansas and Nebraska and allowing these new states to permit or prohibit slavery by popular referendum. The Kansas-Nebraska Act was regarded as a major victory for pro-slavery activists, as the two Compromises had previously restricted any further legalization of slavery to lands south of parallel 36°30′ north. The new possibility of slavery north of this parallel inflamed political tensions, especially in the Northern United States, and immediately triggered a trend of political migration to the territories in hopes of influencing the first territorial elections. The political reaction was immediately negative for Pierce and the Democratic Party. Even some pro-slavery legislators and voters, particularly Southern members of the Whig Party, felt repealing the Missouri Compromise was politically reckless and attempting to push slavery by law and force into territories where most settlers predictably were unlikely to want it endangered slavery everywhere, even in the South.

=== Elections to the 34th United States Congress ===
Elections to the House of Representatives were held in thirty-one states for all 234 seats between August 4, 1854, and November 6, 1855. Each state legislature separately set a date to elect members to the House of Representatives before the 34th Congress convened its first session on December 3, 1855.

These elections were among the most disruptive in American history, bringing the total collapse of the Second Party System. Candidates opposed to the Kansas–Nebraska Act and the administration, included disaffected Democratic voters, won widely in the North from April 1854 through November 1855, but the Whig Party did not reap the benefit. By 1854, most leading national Whigs, e.g., Henry Clay and Daniel Webster, had died, and the party had limited success in recent national elections. The Whigs were associated with big business and seen as elitist and unresponsive to the concerns of the American people over slavery, immigration, industrialization, and monopoly power. Instead, the Whig Party began to disintegrate in all but a handful of states, and new Representatives were elected on a range of oppositional tickets, including the nativist American Party (better known as "Know Nothings"), the People's Party in Indiana, the Anti-Nebraska party in Ohio, and the abolitionist Republican Party in Wisconsin, Michigan, Illinois and Maine. Many new anti-administration representatives were elected on a fusion ticket with support from multiple parties, and many were political novices who frankly admitted they had not expected to be elected.

Taken together, the opposition parties, including the Whigs and the old anti-slavery Free Soil Party, won an estimated net gain of 69 seats nationwide and made up a sizable majority of the House in the 34th Congress. However, due to the confused and overlapping nature of the anti-Nebraska opposition, contemporaries and historians have had difficulty defining the precise makeup of the 34th Congress. The Congressional Globe failed to list party labels in its opening session guide, and according to historian George H. Mayer, "When the votes were counted... the Democrats knew that they had lost, but nobody knew who had won." The anti-Nebraska coalition also had a wide range of positions on slavery, from abolitionists like Joshua Giddings, to former Whigs sympathetic to the slave-dependent economic order, like Solomon G. Haven. Representatives-elect also varied in the importance they placed on slavery as an issue. Many of the American Party representatives-elect, though opposed to the Kansas-Nebraska Act, prioritized the issue of immigration and were willing to compromise with pro-Nebraska Democrats in order to gain support for immigration restriction or anti-Catholic measures.

=== Bleeding Kansas and American Party split ===
As the 34th Congress prepared to meet in its first session, scheduled for December 1855, tensions between Kansas settlers came to a head in the outbreak of political violence. In a conflict which would later come to be known as "Bleeding Kansas," the status of slavery was violently disputed between anti-slavery Free-Staters and pro-slavery Border Ruffians from neighboring Missouri. The settlement of Kansas and especially the activism of emigrant aid companies like the New England Emigrant Aid Company heightened national attention on slavery and Kansas. In June 1855, the national American Party council split over the issue of slavery into its northern and southern wings. As autumn approached, anti-slavery activists and journalists began to congregate in Washington in hopes of organizing the House under an anti-slavery majority. These efforts were boosted on the eve of the opening session, when the administration Democrats adopted a caucus resolution authored by J. Glancy Jones of Pennsylvania which severely denounced nativism and the Know Nothing movement, thus leaving the southern American representatives-elect without any potential coalition partner.

Despite these apparent advantages, organizing anti-slavery men behind a single candidate before the vote failed. Representative-elect Timothy C. Day privately remarked, "There are about thirty modest men who think the country needs their services in the Speaker's chair. To get rid of this swarm of patriots will take time." They could only agree to a resolution presented by Joshua Giddings, to oppose any candidate who was not "pledged ... to organize the standing committees of the House by placing on each a majority of the friends of freedom."

== Process and conventions ==
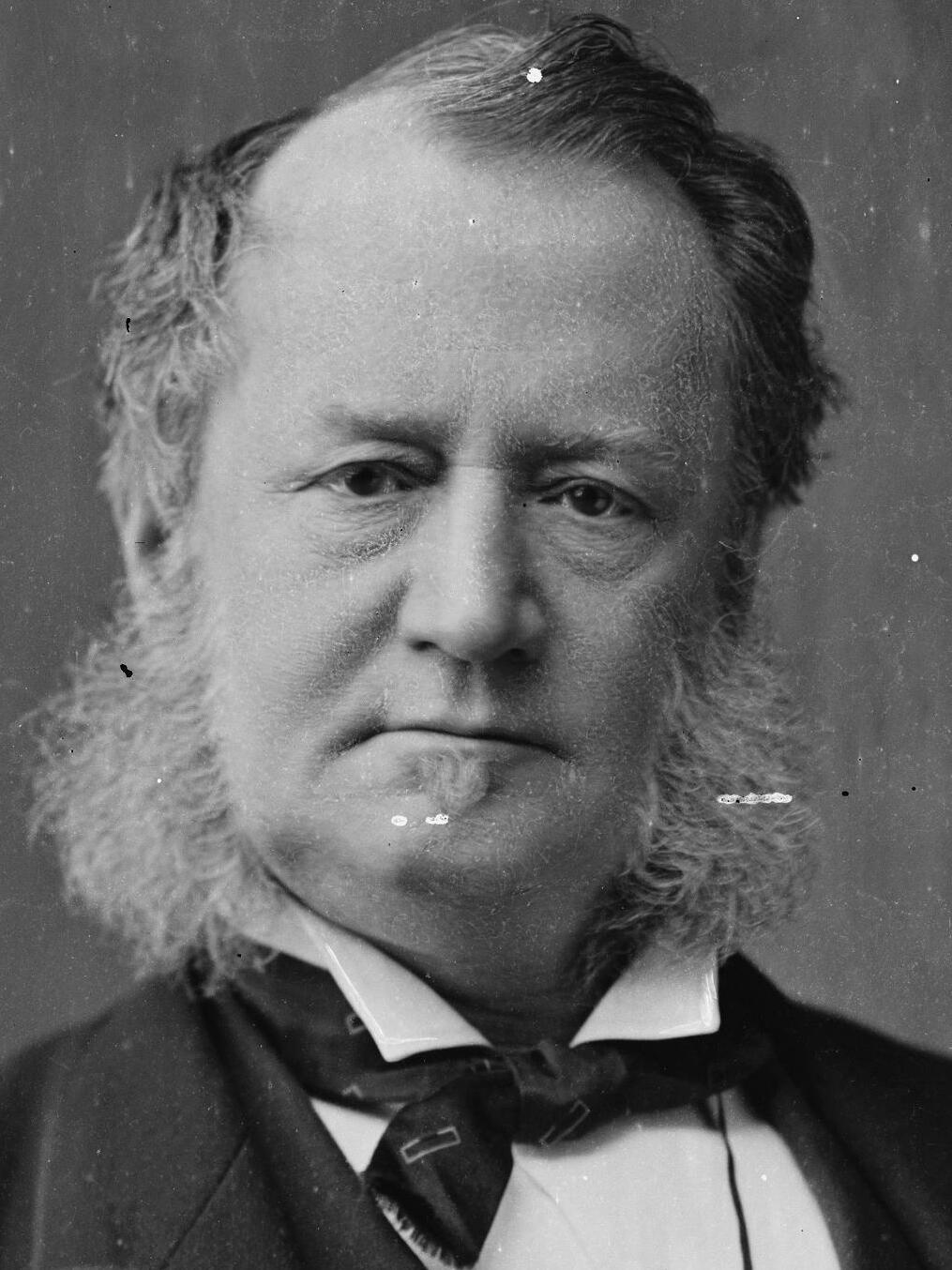
Outgoing clerk John Weiss Forney oversaw the election as the acting presiding officer.

The speaker is the presiding officer of the U.S. House of Representatives. The House elects its speaker at the beginning of each new Congress (i.e., biennially) or when a speaker dies, resigns, or is removed from the position intra-term. Since 1839, the House has elected speakers by roll call vote. Following an election, there being no speaker, the outgoing clerk summons, convenes, and calls the House to order. They then order and oversee the election of a speaker of the House.

Upon winning election, the new speaker is immediately sworn in by the dean of the U.S. House of Representatives, the chamber's longest-serving member. The new speaker then administers the oath en masse to the rest of the members of the House.

To be elected speaker, a candidate typically must receive an absolute majority of the votes cast, as opposed to an absolute majority of the full membership of the House. A variation in the number of votes necessary to win a given election might arise due to vacancies, absentees, or members being present but not voting.

Multiple roll calls had been necessary eleven times since 1789. This had happened most recently in 1849, when Howell Cobb was elected by a plurality on the 63rd ballot, a record at the time.

== Election of the speaker ==
The election for speaker began on December 3, 1855, at the start of the 34th Congress.

At the opening of the session, George W. Jones of Tennessee moved to proceed viva voce to an election of a speaker.

=== Candidates ===
Before balloting began, candidates were placed into nomination, though a candidate need not be nominated to receive votes or win the election. The candidates placed into nomination were:

- Nathaniel Prentiss Banks of Massachusetts, nominated by Alexander De Witt
- Lewis D. Campbell of Ohio, nominated by Benjamin F. Leiter
- Henry M. Fuller of Pennsylvania, nominated by Jonathan Knight
- Humphrey Marshall of Kentucky, nominated by Thomas R. Whitney of New York
- Alexander C. M. Pennington of New Jersey, nominated by James Bishop
- William Alexander Richardson of Illinois, nominated by George W. Jones of Tennessee
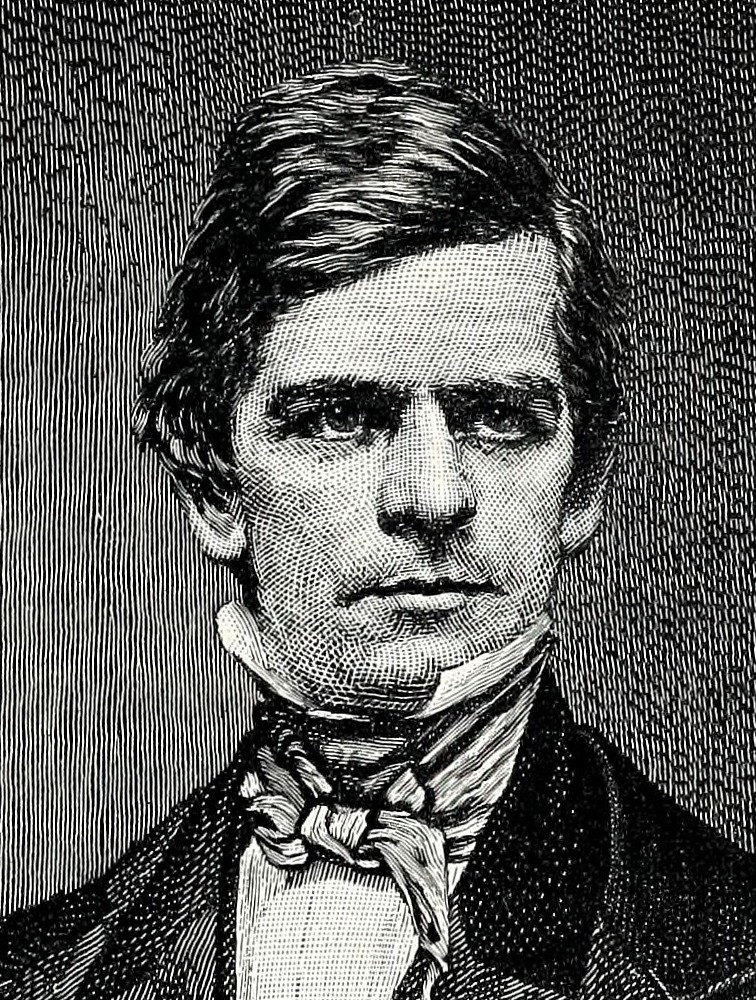
Banks

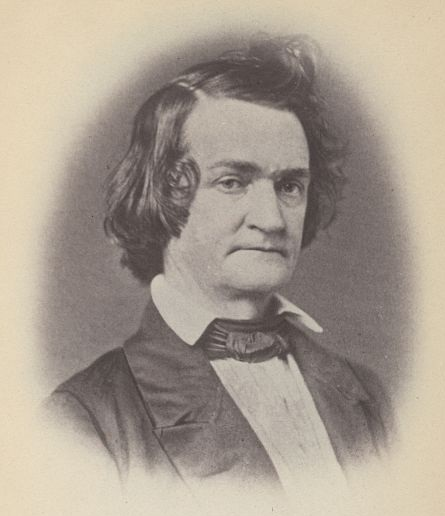
Campbell

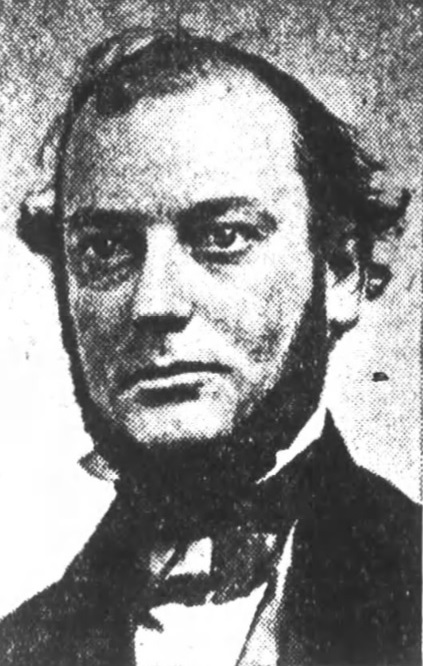
Fuller

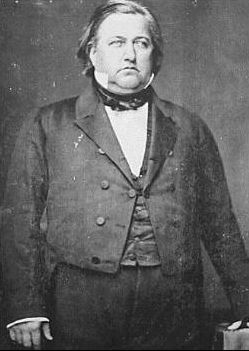
Marshall

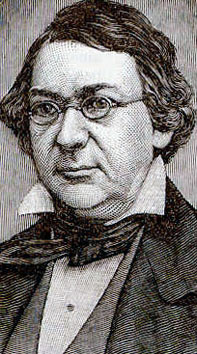
Pennington

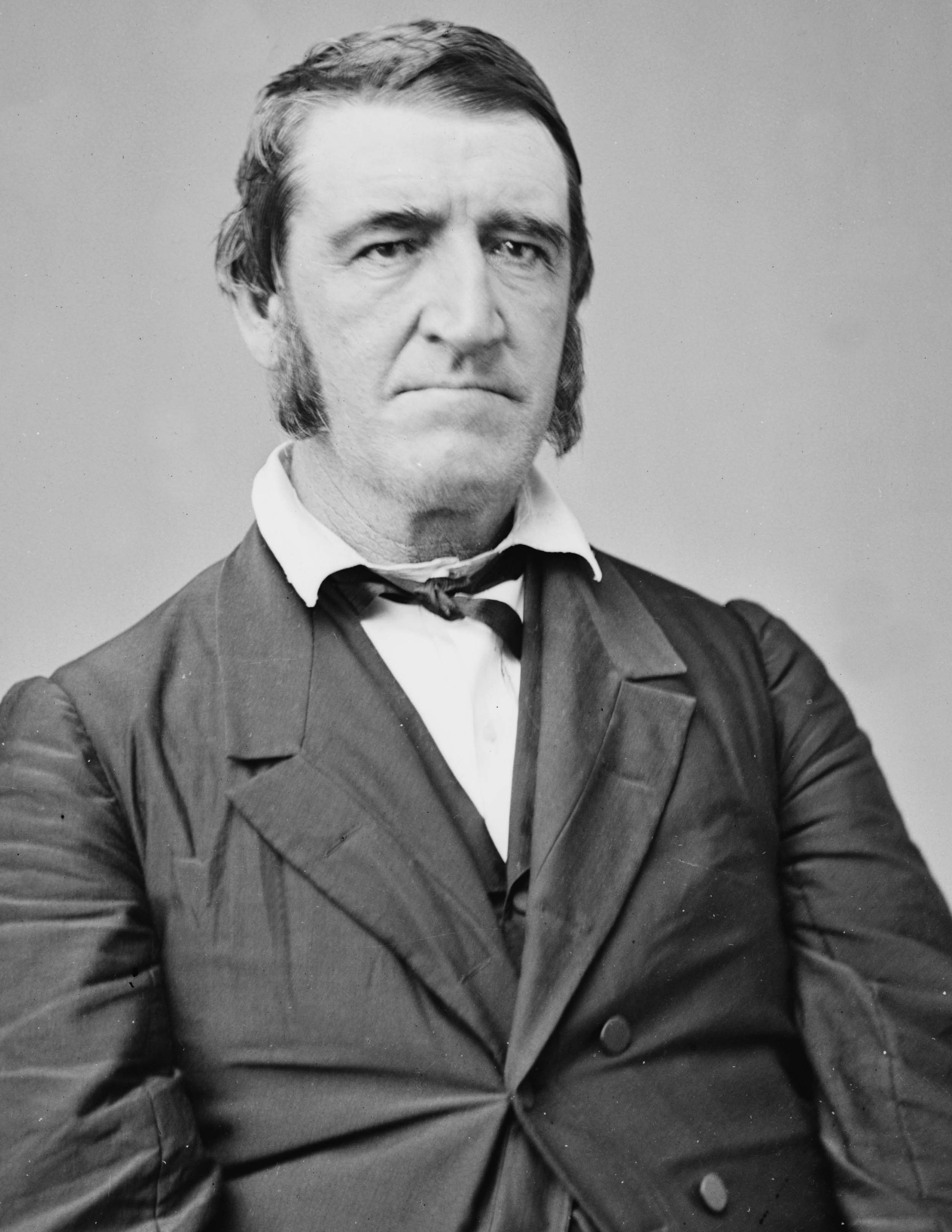
Richardson

Richardson stood as the formally nominated candidate of the Democratic caucus as leader of the minority. Banks, Campbell, Fuller, and Pennington stood as anti-Nebraska candidates opposed to the extension of slavery, while Marshall stood as a southern, pro-Nebraska American Party candidate. The anti-Nebraska faction split regionally, with Banks leading New England, Campbell leading Ohio and the Great Lakes, and Fuller and Pennington supported by their home states of Pennsylvania and New Jersey, respectively.

=== Balloting ===
==== December 3–6: Early ballots ====
From the first ballot, it became clear that the anti-Nebraska majority were completely divided. Seventeen anti-Nebraska candidates polled votes, with none receiving over a quarter of the total. Richardson led the first ballot with 74 votes, with Campbell leading the opposition at 55. Marshall received 39 votes, Banks received 22, Fuller received 18, and Pennington received 7. Two more ballots were taken with similar results. To further confuse matters, four anti-Nebraska Democrats voted with their party for Richardson and three anti-slavery Know Nothings voted for Marshall.

The first two days of the election were dominated by the search for an anti-slavery candidate. Campbell consistently led the coalition on early ballots but fell well short of a majority, as a significant number of votes went to Nathaniel Banks. Banks, a former Democratic–Free Soil politician, presented as a natural alternative to Campbell, a former Whig. At a general anti-Nebraska conference, the coalition agreed to push Campbell's vote as high as possible and, if it proved he could not be elected, throw their support behind Banks. If Banks also failed, Pennington would have been the candidate. Thus, on December 5, the third day of balloting, Campbell reached eighty-one votes but remained thirty short of a majority, as anti-slavery conservatives and anti-Nebraska Democrats refused their support.

==== December 6–7: Campbell and Marshall withdraw ====
On December 6, before the start of balloting, Thomas R. Whitney withdrew the name of Humphrey Marshall, the southern American Party candidate, from the running. The same day, Campbell's support collapsed as anti-slavery votes scattered to Banks, Pennington, and other candidates.

On December 7, between the twenty-third and twenty-fourth ballots, Campbell withdrew his name from contention. In a brief speech, he said,

"[It] is obvious to me that it is impossible for my friends to succeed, unless I can perform one of three conditions: to repudiate my well-known principles in reference to slavery; my views on Americanism; or, in some way directly, or indirectly, to make pledges with regard to the forming of committees which will amount to a sacrifice of my self-respect and make me, in my opinion, a fit object for public contempt."

Campbell's bitter withdrawal cast a shadow over the anti-slavery coalition for the remainder of the contest. He was quoted in the New York Herald referring to Banks as a "dead cock in the pit" and frequently voted against him on subsequent ballots. His accompanying statement also became a major issue on ensuing ballots, as the minority accused the fledgling Republican Party of attempting to secure the speakership by an improper quid pro quo.

==== December 7–15: Banks nominated, Fuller switches ====
With Campbell now out of the race, his supporters split further between Banks, Pennington, and others including Felix Zollicoffer of Tennessee and Benjamin B. Thurston of Rhode Island. On the twenty-fourth ballot, the first after Campbell's withdrawal, Banks received only forty votes but led the opposition. He gained steadily and, after a night of conferences, emerged on December 8 with one hundred votes. By December 10, he had gained two more, coming within a half dozen of a majority and the speakership. He would remain at that margin for the rest of the contest. As Banks began to stall over the next few days, Pennington supporters claimed their candidate should be given a turn, but on December 14, an anti-Nebraska caucus officially named Banks their nominee.

With Banks as the nominee, the anti-slavery faction focused on rallying persuadable votes and keeping their ranks closed. Opposition to Banks was not uniform. Some thought him too extreme or too mild on slavery. Others questioned his convictions on other issues, such as nativism or protectionism, or opposed him because of the support he received from the New York Tribune, personal rivalries, or ambition. Banks openly campaigned for support, denying any connection to abolition and repudiating his own past statements expressing sympathy for dissolution of the Union over slavery but reassuring anti-slavery members that he represented "the strongest anti-slavery district in the United States."

Banks's campaign was headed in the House by Anson Burlingame, Schuyler Colfax, and the three Washburn brothers, Cadwallader, Elihu, and Israel Jr. They planned a three-pronged strategy in Washington to pressure swing votes, which included a letter-writing and telegraph campaign from constituents, personal appeals to representatives-elect from like-minded Banks supporters, and direct lobbying by agents on Banks's behalf. The lobbying efforts were the most controversial prong of the campaign, as opponents accused the Banks men of bribery during and after the election. Though Banks denied any knowledge of bribery, his supporter Horace Greeley privately remarked that the campaign had led him "to see the utility of rascals in the general economy of things." Outside Washington, the Banks strategy was to cast the election not as an inter-party squabble among anti-Nebraska politicians but as a sectional fight over slavery. Journalists and politicians branded the anti-Nebraska men who opposed Banks as "doughfaces" and organized anti-slavery conferences to support Banks.

Meanwhile, Fuller abandoned the anti-Nebraska cause entirely. Beginning with Marshall's withdrawal, Fuller began negotiations with Marshall and Richardson supporters in hopes of forming a coalition of pro-Nebraska Americans, administration Democrats, and Fuller's personal friends. By the eighth, most of Marshall's support had shifted to Fuller, who in turn shed his own initial support in Pennsylvania.

==== December 15–January 9: Searching for a majority ====
As early as December 10, when Banks peaked at 107 votes, efforts were made to secure his victory without a majority. Representative James Thorington of Iowa, a Banks supporter, offered a resolution "similar to that adopted at the commencement of the session in 1849," that "if, after the roll shall have been called three times, no member shall have received a majority of the whole number of votes cast, the roll shall again be called, and the member who shall receive the largest number of votes, provided it be a majority of a quroum, shall be declared to be Speaker." Though Thorington's motion was withdrawn, the plurality rule was introduced no fewer than fifteen times by Banks supporters during the election.

Other schemes included a proposal that no one "be allowed to indulge in the use of meat, drink, fire, or other refreshments, gaslight and water only excepted" until a Speaker was elected and a proposal to vote on each member in alphabetical order until one was approved, which Representative Benjamin Wade objected to as discriminatory against the end of the alphabet.(January 4) Others called longer or continuous sessions, an exhaustive ballot, the appointment of a speaker pro tempore, the collective resignation of all representatives-elect inducing a snap election, or the curtailment or prohibition of debate. Representative Jacob Broom of Pennsylvania sought to curtail debate by proposing a petition to the Supreme Court to request an advisory opinion on the constitutionality of Congressional regulation of slavery in the territories, previewing the upcoming arguments in the Dred Scott v. Sandford case.

By Christmas, administration Democrats began to discuss support for a continuous session or plurality rule. President Pierce urged the resumption of business, and there was genuine belief in the possibility of a Democratic victory if the Fuller men were forced to choose between Richardson and Banks. However, these efforts died out after Pierce delivered his message without issue.

==== January 9–10: Overnight session and the "catechism" ====
On January 9, the House began an all-night session proposed by Democratic leaders, primarily to prevent an election by plurality. Through eighteen hours of debate and balloting, no candidate lost or gained significant footing. At eight o'clock a.m. the next day, with attendance dwindling, the pro-Nebraska men joined to adjourn the chamber.

Soon after, Fuller supporters seeking to embarrass Richardson and force a fusion behind their candidate called for a "catechism" designed to investigate the political views of the three leading candidates on slavery in the territories, the Fugitive Slave Act, nativism, and white supremacy. In their replies, Fuller and Richardson delivered pro-Nebraska responses, while Banks denounced the bill:

- On the question of slavery in the territories, Banks defended congressional authority, while Fuller took the extreme opposite position, denying even that territorial legislatures could regulate slavery, except to protect the property rights of slaveowners. Richardson compromised, stating that the Constitution and Fugitive Slave Law applied to the territories.
- Both Fuller and Richardson opposed the abolition of slavery in the District of Columbia, while Banks declined to answer the question.
- Fuller defended nativism, while Richardson opposed it. Banks referred to his own record on the issue.
- Fuller and Richardson agreed in support of the principle of white supremacy. Banks alluded to the Declaration of Independence as asserting that "all men are created equal" and declared that "time should determine the superiority of the black or the white race, by one of them absorbing the other."

Each candidate was affected by their responses to the survey. Fuller's gambit paid off, strengthening his hold on the pro-Nebraska Know Nothings while weakening support for his opponents. Richardson's failure to denounce the Wilmot Proviso as an unconstitutional restriction on slavery offended some Democratic loyalists, and three South Carolinians deserted him on the next ballot. Banks was assailed as an "amalgamationist" for his views on race, harming his chances at victory, and he eventually publicly recanted his remarks.

==== January 23–24: Rust resolution, Richardson withdraws ====
Under pressure from President Pierce, administration men sought a compromise. After offers to vote by plurality in exchange for Banks's withdrawal failed, Albert Rust of Arkansas introduced a resolution to force the leading candidates to withdraw. The resolution, aimed at Banks, implied that personal ambitions stood in the way of organization. However, Banks men allied with a half dozen administration Democrats to defeat the motion. With Richardson voting in favor, he was forced to withdraw to save his reputation. Before the start of balloting, Richardson announced that, "after today my name will be unconditionally withdrawn from the pending canvass for the speakership. ... I hope this course may lead to a speedy organization. I fear that discord will still reign in this Hall, and that history will record the fact as an evidence against our ability for self-government." He was succeeded by James L. Orr of South Carolina as the Democratic caucus nominee.

On January 24, before the start of balloting, Fuller attempted to withdraw his name as well, stating, "This has been my desire for weeks; I have so expressed myself to my friends." Though his support dipped on the initial ballot following his nominal withdrawal, with many supporters voting for James Ricaud of Maryland, the Fuller votes recovered quickly and the balloting returned to its status quo.

==== January 30–February 2: Plurality rule adopted, Banks elected ====
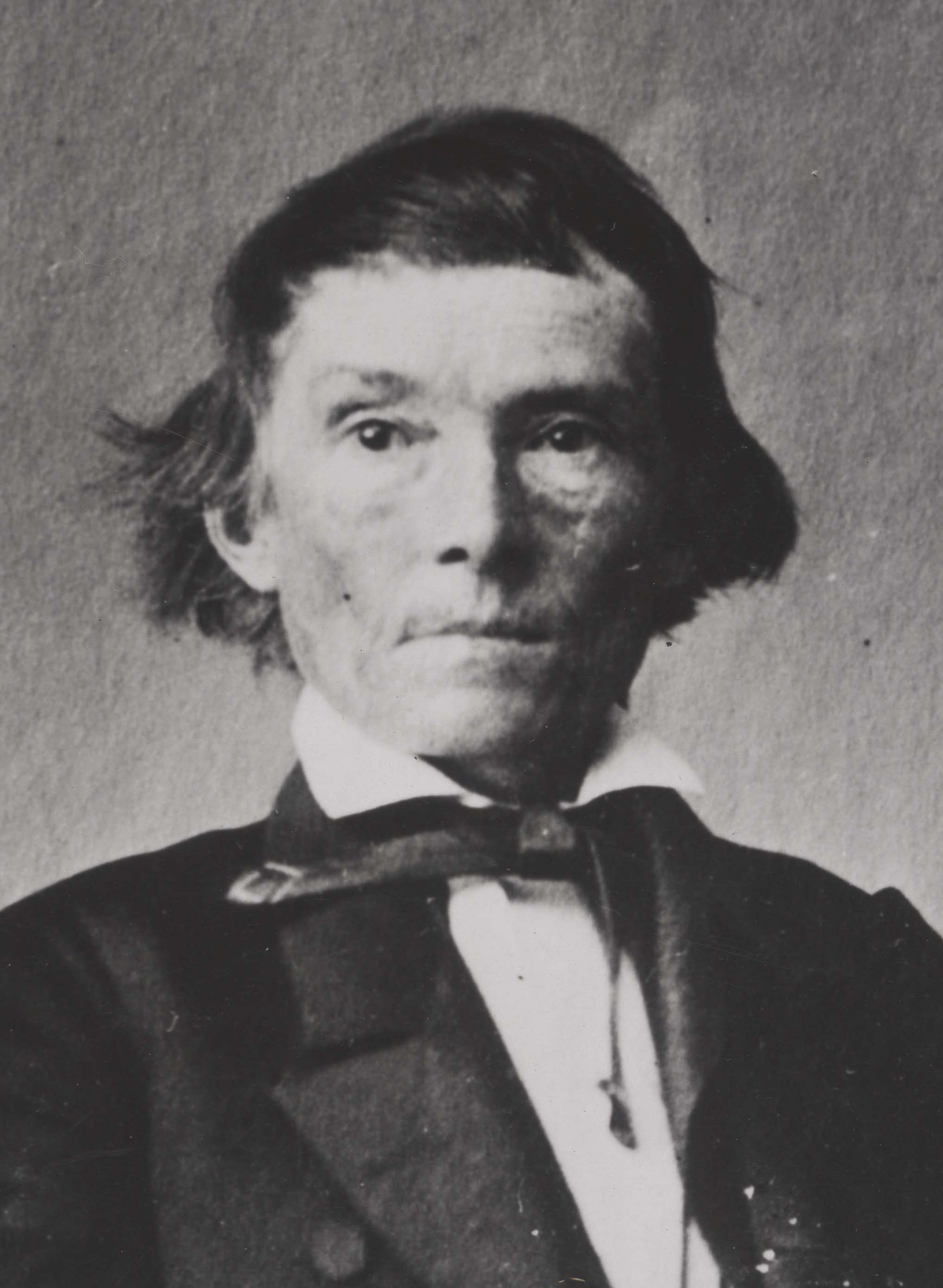
Alexander H. Stephens of Georgia, a Southern unionist, concocted a plan to elect William Aiken Jr. as a compromise candidate by plurality.

From the time Richardson withdrew onwards, debate focused on the plurality rule, with some administration men who sought to finally organize the House joining Banks men in support.

On January 30, Thomas L. Clingman of North Carolina moved for elections by plurality, along the lines of the 1849 resolution. Clingman's resolution divided the Democratic Party and the South. He argued that a failure to vote against Banks or Orr in a direct decision in fact meant that the voter "prefers him, of course, to the other." Several Democratic representatives spoke out against the motion. Philemon T. Herbert of California spoke in favor while denouncing those willing to "clothe [Banks] with power, who but a few days since expressed in their own hearing a doubt as to the superiority of the white man over the negro." William W. Boyce of South Carolina denounced "a single step toward the election of Mr. Banks... as one of the greatest misfortunes that could happen to this country ... as death to the Constitution and the Union." The resolution was voted down 106 to 110. The next day, it was reintroduced and failed 108 to 110.

Sensing that Clingman's resolution and the narrow vote of January 31 meant the plurality rule would soon be adopted, Alexander H. Stephens of Georgia privately proposed to allow the plurality rule to go into effect and substitute William Aiken Jr. of South Carolina before the final ballot. Unlike Orr, Aiken was not an active member of the caucus and had expressed no opinion on nativism, having avoided the caucus in which J. Glancy Jones's resolution was adopted. The Stephens plan gained the quiet support of the southern Know Nothing representatives-elect who had thus far voted for Fuller.

On February 1, representatives-elect offered several names, including Banks and Stephens, to be elected Speaker directly by resolution. Despite Stephens's plan to spring Aiken's name as a surprise only after a plurality rule was adopted, representatives-elect Williamson Cobb of Alabama and John Kelly of New York offered Aiken as a nominee directly. The Aiken resolution survived a motion to table by a vote of 98 to 117, and though Aiken was defeated by 103 to 110, he received several opposition votes. Though Cobb and Kelly had also cost Stephens the element of surprise, Aiken's total vote and ability to rally pro-Nebraska men and Fuller men raised Democratic confidence. (Note: There is also evidence that Banks men intentionally inflated the Aiken vote to goad Democrats into adopting the plurality rule by having Fuller men Jacob Broom and Thomas R. Whitney, neither of whom ultimately voted for Aiken, change their votes from nay to aye.) Last-ditch efforts to pass a compromise resolution, including one to appoint Banks, Aiken, and Fuller to vote on a Speaker as a committee of three, failed.

On February 2, the House floor and galleries were packed as most anticipated the adoption of the plurality rule and the election of a Speaker. The day opened with a motion to proceed under plurality rule was reintroduced by Samuel A. Smith of Tennessee, a pro-Nebraska administration man. Smith argued that while he had voted against the rule before, the results of the previously day demonstrated that "a well-known man of sound, national principles, under its operation, may be elected." The motion was adopted by a vote of 113 to 104, with nine Pierce Democrats and one Fuller man joining the Banks men in the majority.

The balloting proceeded despite repeated efforts to adjourn, with Banks, Aiken, and Fuller all receiving votes. On the fourth and final ballot of the day, Banks narrowly defeated Aiken 103 to 100. Six northern representatives-elect (Jacob Broom, Bayard Clark, Elisha D. Cullen, Henry Winter Davis, William Millward, and Thomas R. Whitney) held out and voted for Fuller. Four others from Indiana and Ohio (George G. Dunn, John Scott Harrison, Oscar F. Moore, and Harvey D. Scott) voted for Lewis D. Campbell, and John Hickman voted for Daniel Wells Jr. of Wisconsin.

Though some in the minority claimed that Banks had not been elected until a formal resolution declared him Speaker, debate ended when Aiken asked permission to escort Banks to the chair himself. The formal resolution was soon adopted.

==== Summary of balloting ====
Date	Ballot	▌ Banks	▌ Campbell	▌ Pennington	▌ Fuller	▌ Marshall	▌ Richardson	Others	Total	Majority	Date	Ballot	▌ Banks	▌ Fuller	▌ Richardson	Others	Total	Majority	Date	Ballot	▌ Banks	▌ Fuller	▌ Richardson	▌ Orr	▌ Aiken	Others	Total	Majority
December 3	1st	21	53	7	17	30	74	23	225	113	December 12	46th	106	33	74	11	224	113	January 4	91st	104	34	73			9	220	111
December 3	2nd	22	55	7	18	30	74	18	224	113	December 12	47th	106	32	74	11	223	112	January 4	92nd	104	34	73			10	221	111
December 3	3rd	23	55	8	18	30	74	16	224	113	December 12	48th	105	32	74	12	223	112	January 5	93rd	103	32	72			10	218	110
December 3	4th	22	56	8	17	30	72	17	222	112	December 12	49th	105	35	75	11	226	114	January 5	94th	98	29	72			11	210	106
December 4	5th	23	58	8	19	20	78	18	220	111	December 12	50th	105	33	75	11	224	113	January 7	95th	101	29	73			11	214	108
December 4	6th	25	57	9	23	18	75	18	223	112	December 13	51st	105	33	75	11	224	113	January 7	96th	99	30	73			12	214	108
December 4	7th	28	54	10	20	20	75	17	223	112	December 13	52nd	104	32	75	11	222	112	January 7	97th	97	30	73			14	214	108
December 4	8th	32	51	9	20	18	75	17	222	112	December 13	53rd	104	34	74	10	222	112	January 7	98th	99	30	72			15	216	109
December 4	9th	31	51	10	21	16	75	19	223	112	December 13	54th	104	35	74	9	222	112	January 7	99th	97	33	72			12	214	108
December 5	10th	32	48	9	21	25	72	13	220	111	December 13	55th	104	38	73	7	222	112	January 9 & 10	100th	90	32	68			10	200	101
December 5	11th	37	47	9	19	25	74	11	223	112	December 14	56th	106	40	73	5	224	113	January 9 & 10	101st	88	28	65			11	192	97
December 5	12th	12	75	6	19	21	73	13	218	110	December 14	57th	105	41	74	5	226	114	January 9 & 10	102nd	92	28	68			10	199	100
December 5	13th	9	79	7	21	22	74	10	223	112	December 14	58th	106	41	73	5	225	113	January 9 & 10	103rd	92	26	67			11	196	99
December 5	14th	8	81	5	21	13	74	21	223	112	December 14	59th	105	41	74	4	224	113	January 9 & 10	104th	92	29	67			11	199	100
December 5	15th	8	80	7	19	6	74	25	219	110	December 15	60th	105	40	74	6	225	113	January 9 & 10	105th	88	28	63			9	188	95
December 6	16th	6	79	9	20		72	36	222	111	December 15	61st	105	40	74	6	225	113	January 9 & 10	106th	88	27	62			10	187	94
December 6	17th	14	69	9	21		73	31	218	110	December 17	62nd	106	37	73	7	223	112	January 11	107th	98	32	70			12	212	107
December 6	18th	18	62	11	21		72	33	217	109	December 17	63rd	105	38	73	7	223	112	January 12	108th	94	34	69			10	207	104
December 6	19th	18	57	14	23		71	31	214	108	December 17	64th	106	38	73	6	223	112	January 14	109th	95	34	66			16	211	106
December 6	20th	23	48	19	22		71	33	216	109	December 19	65th	102	38	75	6	219	110	January 14	110th	95	33	65			16	209	105
December 6	21st	21	45	20	21		71	32	211	106	December 19	66th	106	34	73	9	224	113	January 14	111th	95	33	64			16	208	105
December 7	22nd	11	74	9	20		73	34	221	111	December 20	67th	103	34	72	10	221	111	January 15	112th	92	34	65			16	207	104
December 7	23rd	10	75	9	16		73	39	221	111	December 24	68th	101	30	66	9	215	108	January 15	113th	92	33	65			16	206	104
December 7	24th	41		18	19		74	69	220	111	December 27	69th	100	30	66	9	205	103	January 15	114th	93	33	66			17	209	105
December 7	25th	44		18	22		72	63	219	110	December 27	70th	103	31	67	10	211	106	January 16	115th	88	29	65			13	195	98
December 7	26th	46		17	27		72	59	221	111	December 27	71st	103	31	67	10	211	106	January 17	116th	94	32	65			9	203	102
December 7	27th	49		17	28		73	48	215	108	December 27	72nd	103	31	67	10	211	106	January 19	117th	94	31	69			8	202	102
December 8	28th	86			26		73	34	219	110	December 28	73rd	101	30	68	8	207	104	January 21	118th	92	31	65			8	197	99
December 8	29th	97			18		73	35	221	111	December 28	74th	100	31	68	8	207	104	January 22	119th	91	29	67			8	195	98
December 8	30th	98			28		73	20	219	110	December 28	75th	101	31	68	8	208	105	January 22	120th	91	28	67			8	194	98
December 8	31st	99			20		72	21	221	111	December 28	76th	101	31	67	8	208	105	January 22	121st	91	29	67			8	195	98
December 8	32nd	100			29		72	19	221	111	December 29	77th	101	32	68	8	209	105	January 23	122nd	90	30	65			9	194	98
December 8	33rd	100			30		73	19	222	112	December 29	78th	103	30	68	8	211	106	January 24	123rd	96	12		68		27	203	102
December 10	34th	100			30		74	16	221	111	December 29	79th	102	31	68	8	209	105	January 24	124th	95	25		68		13	201	101
December 10	35th	105			31		76	15	225	113	December 29	80th	101	30	68	9	208	105	January 25	125th	94	28		65		12	200	101
December 10	36th	106			29		76	15	226	114	December 29	81st	102	30	68	9	209	105	January 25	126th	94	29		65		11	199	100
December 10	37th	107			29		76	13	224	113	December 29	82nd	100	30	68	10	208	105	January 25	127th	94	25		64		12	196	98
December 10	38th	107			28		75	15	225	113	December 29	83rd	99	29	67	10	205	103	January 28	128th	97	35		67		7	206	104
December 10	39th	107			28		76	15	226	114	December 29	84th	98	29	66	10	203	102	January 29	129th	99	34		69		8	210	106
December 11	40th	107			27		74	16	224	113	January 2, 1856	85th	103	32	72	11	218	110	February 2	130th	102	14			93	6	215	108
December 11	41st	107			28		74	16	225	113	January 2, 1856	86th	101	30	71	11	213	107	February 2	131st	103	13			93	6	214	108
December 11	42nd	106			27		75	17	225	113	January 3	87th	102	33	73	11	219	110	February 2	132nd	102	13			92	6	213	107
December 11	43rd	107			28		75	16	226	114	January 3	88th	102	33	73	11	219	110	February 2	133rd	103	6			100	5	214	N/A
December 11	44th	107			28		74	16	225	113	January 3	89th	102	33	73	11	219	110										
December 11	45th	106			27		74	16	223	112	January 3	90th	101	30	72	11	214	108										

== Aftermath and legacy ==
Joshua Giddings, as dean of the House, swore Banks in as Speaker after his election on February 2.

=== Contemporary reaction ===
Contemporaries immediately began to refer to Banks's election as the "first Northern victory" in the emerging sectional conflict over slavery which would lead to the American Civil War. Justin S. Morrill later said, "This was the first gust, the large pelting drops, that preceded the storm of 1861."

Opinion was largely divided along sectional lines. In the North and among abolitionists, the election was acclaimed as a long-awaited victory over the Slave Power. Hundred-gun saltues were fired in several New England cities. Joshua Giddings wrote to his daughter, "On Saturday we were in the wood, the dark and dreary forest was and around us, but on Monday we were in the promised land which flowed with milk and honey." Reaction in the South was negative, casting Banks's election as a sectional imposition of Northern will rather than a compromise. Some Democratic unionists took a subdued response. Alexander Stephens called the election the first "purely sectional" vote for speaker and noted Banks declined to make a typical pledge to "save the Union." The radical Charleston Mercury editorialized, "Never will conscience, or justice, or the Constitution, obtrude their voice in the execution of [Banks's] appointed task. The creature of party, and the tool of fanaticism, who can foretell his course?"

William Lloyd Garrison wrote in his Liberator, "Let us hope that this result is but the first gun at Lexington of the new Revolution. If so, then Bunker Hill and Yorktown are before us! All we have to do is press onward—right onward!"

=== Establishment of Republican Party ===
Historians have noted Banks as the initial symbol of the emerging Republican Party and his speakership as the origin point of the party's institutional organization. Immediately after the election, Giddings remarked, "We have got our party formed, consolidated and established." Thurlow Weed commented, "This triumph is worth all it cost in time, toil and solicitude ... [for] the Republican Party is now inaugurated. We can work with a will."

A spatial analysis of the speakership election conducted by Jeffrey A. Jenkins and Timothy P. Nokken concluded that the voting patterns of individual members during the election were predictable from the outset as a function of their respective positions on slavery, whereas nativism had greater variability with any individual member's vote. On the final ballot, the split of the Fuller supporters between Banks and Aiken was highly predictable by both region and position on slavery. Jenkins and Nokken further argue that the organization of the House under Banks's leadership, which placed anti-slavery men (including Giddings, Pennington, Campbell, and the Washburn brothers) at the heads of most influential committees, allowed the Republican Party to operate as a single-issue, anti-slavery coalition before expanding its electoral platform in the critical election of 1860.

The election also contributed to the death of the Know Nothing movement in the North, as many anti-Nebraska representatives-elect who prioritized nativism over slavery lost favor, and signaled the decline of the movement in the South as well, having demonstrated that pro-Nebraska Americans would prioritize slavery over nativism.
