= William Aiken =

American transportation pioneer (1779–1831)

President of South Carolina Canal and Railroad Company
- In office 1827 – May 5, 1831
- Preceded by: Railroad established*
- Succeeded by: Elias Horry

Personal details
- Born: 1779 County Antrim, Kingdom of Ireland
- Died: May 5, 1831 (aged 51–52) Charleston, South Carolina, U.S.

William Aiken Sr. (1779 – May 5, 1831) was the founder and president of the pioneering South Carolina Canal and Rail Road Company.

Born in County Antrim, Ireland, he immigrated to Charleston, South Carolina at age 10. He was raised Presbyterian. He married Henrietta Watt in 1801. They raised two children, one of whom died in infancy, while the other, William Aiken Jr., became a prominent statesman and planter, serving at the governor of South Carolina. They lived at 456 King Street from 1807 until his death in 1831.

The railroad company was established at a meeting at Aitken's house in 1827, and Aiken was selected as President. Construction of the railroad began in January 1830. Aitken was killed in 1831 in Charleston, in a carriage accident caused by the sound of the train spooking his horse. The railroad was eventually completed in 1833, and measuring 136 miles, was the longest railroad under one management in the world at the time.

The William Aiken House and Associated Railroad Structures, a historic district comprising one of Aitken's homes and selected structures of the railway, was declared a National Historic Landmark in 1963, and listed on the U.S. National Register of Historic Places in 1966.

A second of Aitken's homes, the Robinson-Aiken House, also known as the Gov. William Aiken House, was added to the National Register in 1977. Aitken's son, William Aiken Jr., acquired the house after his father's death.

Aiken County, South Carolina and City of Aiken, South Carolina, industrial beneficiaries of his railroad, were named in his honor.

In 2011, a statue was donated by the URS Corporation on the occasion of the City of Aiken's 175th year. The statue depicts Aiken patiently waiting, pocket watch in hand, for the next train to arrive - a symbol of the industry his railroad brought to Aiken, South Carolina.

== Removal of Historical Marker ==
In March 2025, the reference to William Aiken Sr. and the accompanying biographical information were removed from the historical marker at the Aiken County Courthouse. A new marker replaced the original attribution with a list of alternative names once considered for the county, omitting any explanation of Aiken’s role in the naming.

The old marker that was removed read, "Aiken County, created in 1871 from parts of Barnwell, Edgefield, Lexington and Orangeburg counties, was named for William Aiken, first president of the South Carolina Canal and Railroad Company. Older industries in the county today are textiles, and the mining and processing of kaolin. In 1952, the Atomic Energy Commission's Savannah River Plant began operations."

The new marker reads, "As early as the late 1820s, residents of this part of S.C. sought to create a new county due to the need for a local courthouse. Efforts were unsuccessful until the 1870-71 legislative session, when Rep. Charles D. Hayne of Barnwell District introduced a bill to create a county with the city of Aiken as its seat. Names considered for the county included Randolph, Woodbury and, finally, Aiken. On March 10, 1871, Governor Robert K. Scott signed the act creating 'Aiken County. Founded during the Reconstruction era (1865-1877), Aiken County was cut from portions of Barnwell, Lexington and Orangeburg counties. Two committees established to set the county's borders and provide for its government buildings include formerly enslaved and free-born African American men as well as white men. The first courthouse was the Gregg Mansion on Colleton Avenue. In 1872, residents elected the county's first officers and state legislators."
