= Gov. William Aiken House =

Historic house in South Carolina, United States

- U.S. National Register of Historic Places
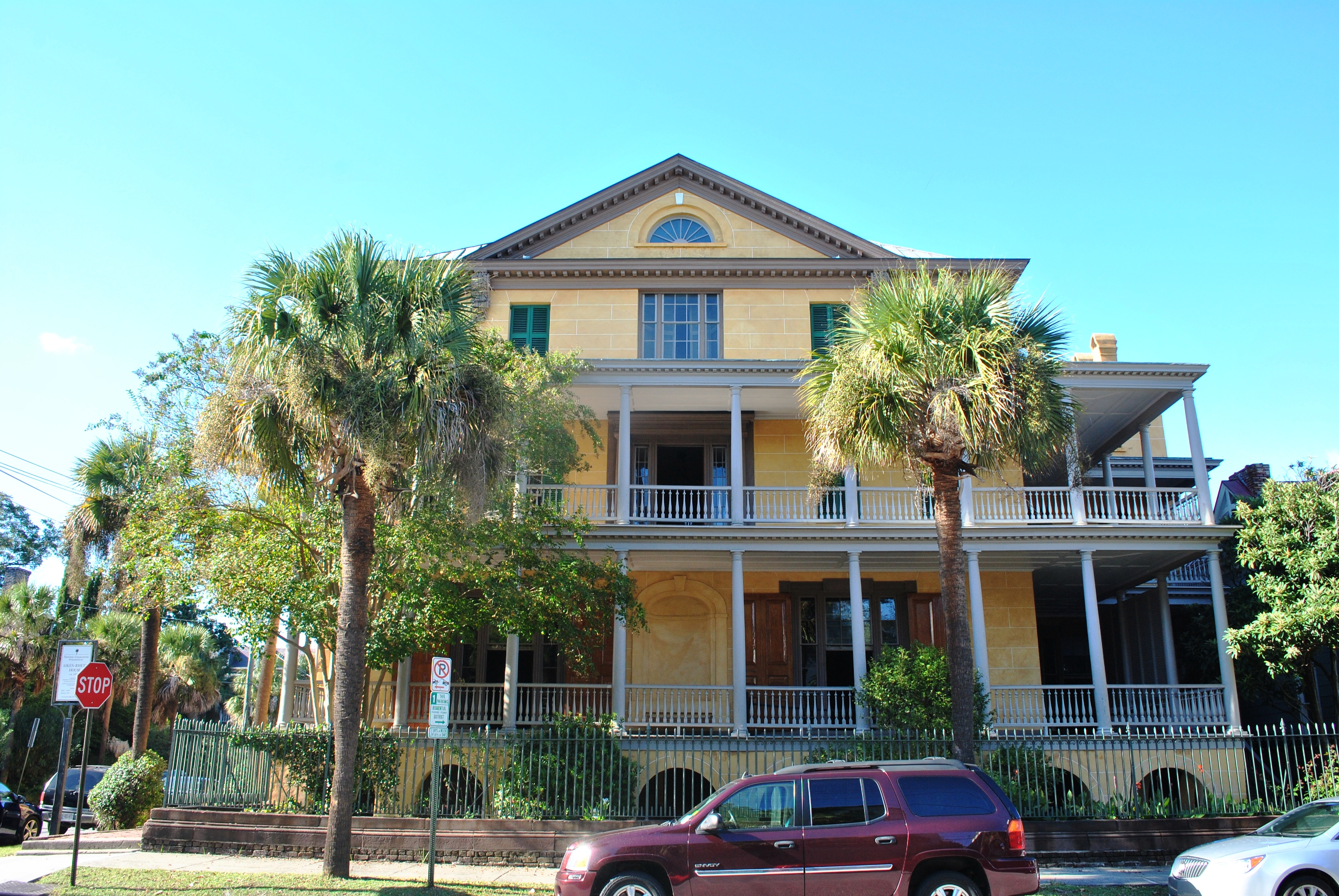
- Gov. William Aiken House

- Location within South Carolina Location within the United States
- Location: 48 Elizabeth St., Charleston, South Carolina
- Coordinates: 32°47′29″N 79°56′6″W
- Area: less than one acre
- Built: 1820
- Architectural style: Greek Revival, Late Victorian, Federal
- NRHP reference No.: 77001216
- Added to NRHP: November 21, 1977

The Gov. William Aiken House (also known as the Aiken-Rhett House, or the Robinson-Aiken House) was built in 1820 at 48 Elizabeth Street, in the Wraggborough neighborhood of Charleston, South Carolina. Despite being known for its association with Gov. William Aiken, the house was built by John Robinson after he bought several lots in Mazyck-Wraggborough in 1817. His house was originally configured as a Charleston double house with entrance to the house from the south side along Judith Street. The house is considered to be the best preserved complex of antebellum domestic structures in Charleston. It was the home of William Aiken, Jr., a governor of South Carolina, and before that the home of his father, the owner of South Carolina Canal and Railroad Company, William Aiken.

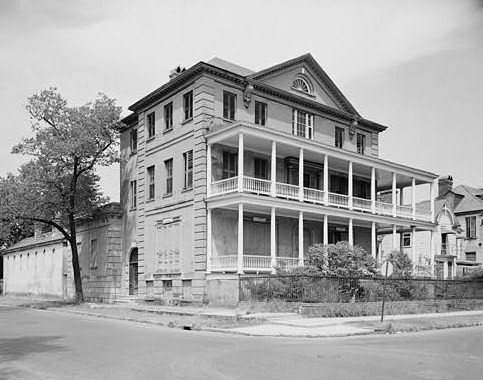
Gov. William Aiken House

Frances Dill Rhett, whose husband was a direct descendant of Gov. William Aiken, donated the house to the Charleston Museum in 1975. The house was listed on the National Register of Historic Places in 1977. Since 1995, Historic Charleston Foundation has owned and operated the Aiken-Rhett House as a historic house museum.

== Preservation ==
The Aiken family owned the house for over 142 years until, in 1975, it was donated to the Charleston Museum. Twenty years later, Historic Charleston Foundation bought it. Since the 1995 purchase of the Aiken property, a more traditional approach has been taken to preserve the property. According to the Historic Charleston Foundation, what attracted them to purchasing the property was its "unique opportunity to understand and present antebellum urban life and the African American heritage of Charleston to the public."

== Slavery ==
An attractive feature of the Aiken House is its urban development. Most scholars of southern history and culture define antebellum plantation mansions being surrounded by agricultural developments, such as other Charleston area plantations, Drayton Hall, McLeod Plantation, and Magnolia Plantation. However most southern antebellum cities were entrenched in slavery - Richmond, Savannah, and Charleston - which populations made up usually one third of the total city population. According to the 1850 census, Aiken enslaved 7 individuals inside the urban residence, although the Aikens enslaved 878 people in the Charleston and Colleton districts combined. In 1860, the number of enslaved people at the urban residence had increased to 19 individuals. By the time the American Civil War broke out, at least 13 enslaved people were at the Aiken property, including 6 children.

== Exhibits and interpretation ==
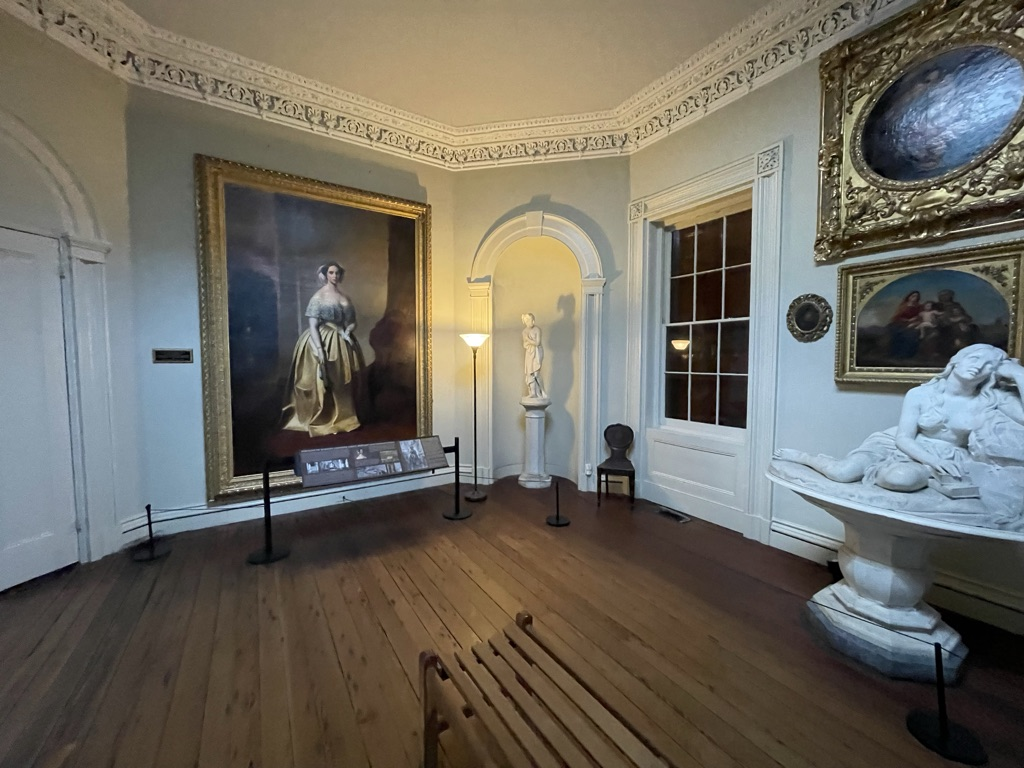
Art Gallery in the Aiken-Rhett House, including the portrait of Aiken's wife, Harriet Lowndes Aiken.

In 2016, a team of archaeologists began to research and survey the slave dwellings on the Aiken-Rhett property. By 2018, the team was able to uncover over 10,000 artifacts. A large majority of the pieces are currently still on display within an exhibit interpreting their cultural significance. The artifacts span from coins and tools, to pieces of bottles and pottery. In a separate research and archeological survey in 2017, a team of archeologists were able to search for evidence of siege lines that British soldiers reportedly dug in the spring of 1780. Historic Charleston Foundation launched an app in the fall of 2018, which offers further information on topics and a self-guided audio tour. The tour lasts for roughly 45 minutes and includes exhibit descriptions and photographs. The decision to update the tour reportedly came from the director of museums at Historic Charleston Foundation, Lauren Northup. The art gallery only has about 1/3 of the original artwork that was once at the house.The older guide for the Aiken-Rhett was constructed in the mid-1990s, and "left out many of the stories they had discovered since then about the lives of the enslaved on the property." The foundation later updated the app to cover more of the Charleston area historic house museums, such as the Nathaniel Russel House and the Magnolia Cemetery. In addition to the stories of enslaved people and the African American community, women's history and LGBTQ community have been included as well inside the app.

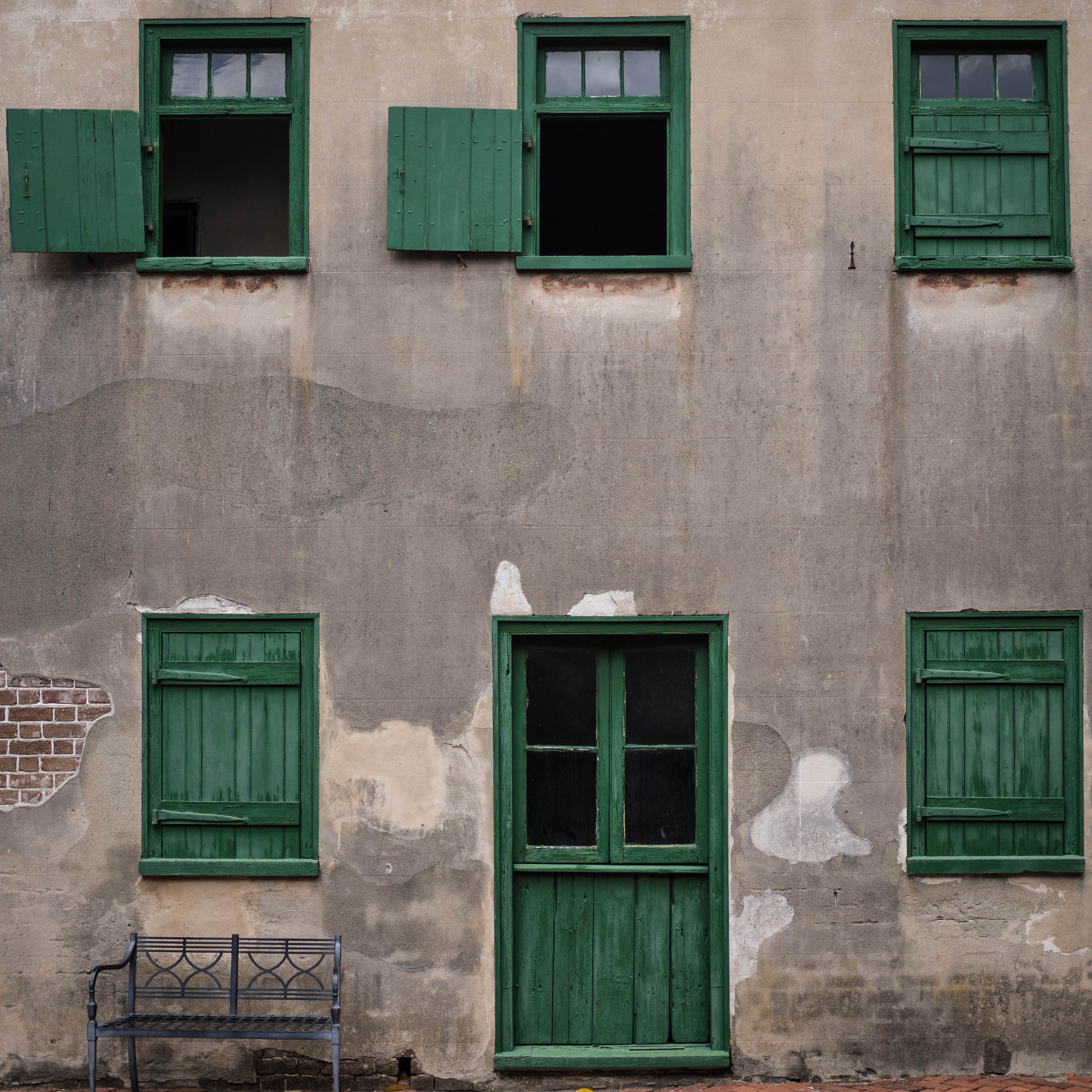
Urban slave quarters on the Aiken-Rhett property.

- William Aiken House and Associated Railroad Structures
