= William Aiken Jr. =

American politician (1806–1887)

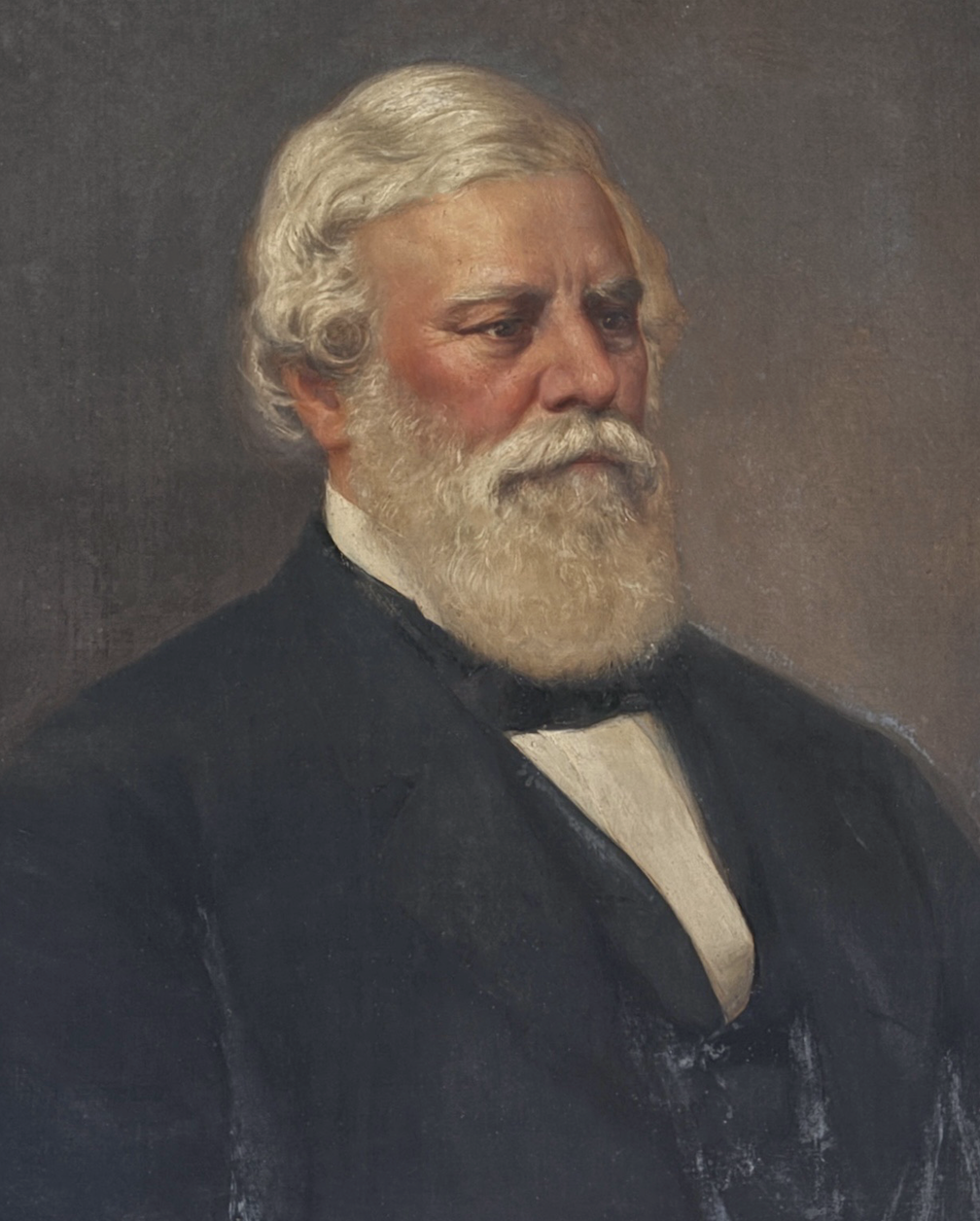
- Unattributed Portrait, c. 1859-1885

61st Governor of South Carolina
- In office December 7, 1844 – December 8, 1846
- Lieutenant: John Fulton Ervin
- Preceded by: James Henry Hammond
- Succeeded by: David Johnson

Member of the U.S. House of Representatives from South Carolina
- In office March 4, 1851 – March 3, 1857
- Preceded by: Isaac E. Holmes
- Succeeded by: William P. Miles
- Constituency: 6th district (1851–53); 2nd district (1853–57)
- In office February 12, 1867 – Elected but not seated

Member of the South Carolina Senate from St. Philip's and St. Michael's Parish
- In office November 28, 1842 – December 7, 1844

Member of the South Carolina House of Representatives from St. Philip's and St. Michael's Parish
- In office November 26, 1838 – November 28, 1842

Personal details
- Born: January 28, 1806 Charleston, South Carolina, US
- Died: September 6, 1887 (aged 81) Flat Rock, North Carolina, US
- Resting place: Magnolia Cemetery, Charleston, South Carolina
- Party: Democratic
- Spouse: Harriet Lowndes Aiken (m. 1831)
- Relations: Burnet R. Maybank (great-grandson); Andrew Burnet Rhett (son-in-law)
- Children: Henrietta Aiken Rhett; Thomas Lowndes Aiken
- Parent(s): William Aiken; Henrietta Wyatt Aiken
- Education: South Carolina College (agriculture)
- Occupation: businessman · politician
- Profession: planter

William Aiken Jr. (January 28, 1806 – September 6, 1887) was an American statesman, planter, and Southern Unionist who served as the 61st governor of South Carolina from 1844 to 1846. He also served in the state legislature and the United States House of Representatives, running unsuccessfully for speaker of the House in 1856 in "the longest and most contentious Speaker election in House history."

== Early life ==
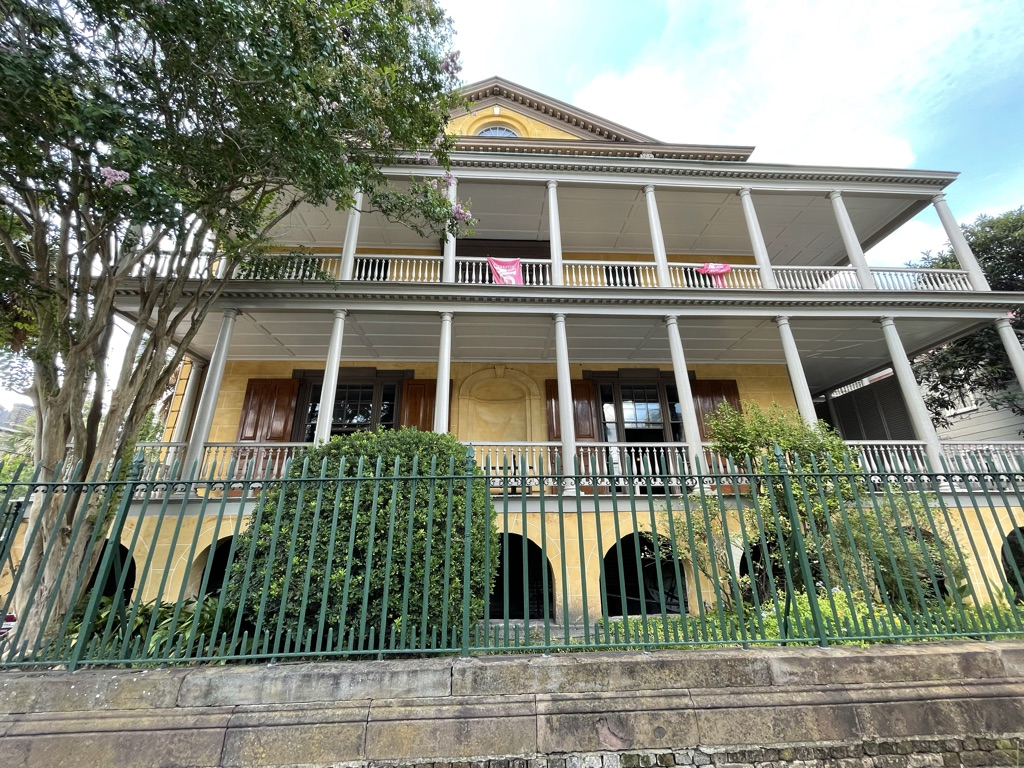
Aiken-Rhett House, 2022 in Charleston, South Carolina

Aiken was the child of William Aiken Sr., the first president of the South Carolina Canal and Rail Road Company, and Henrietta Wyatt. Unfortunately, William Sr. was killed in a Charleston carriage accident and never saw his namesake town of Aiken, South Carolina. Aiken graduated from the College of South Carolina (now the University of South Carolina) at Columbia in 1825 and engaged in agriculture as a planter, entering politics in 1837. He was a member of the State House of Representatives 1838–1842, and served in the State Senate 1842–1844. His term as governor ran from 1844 to 1846.

== Personal life ==
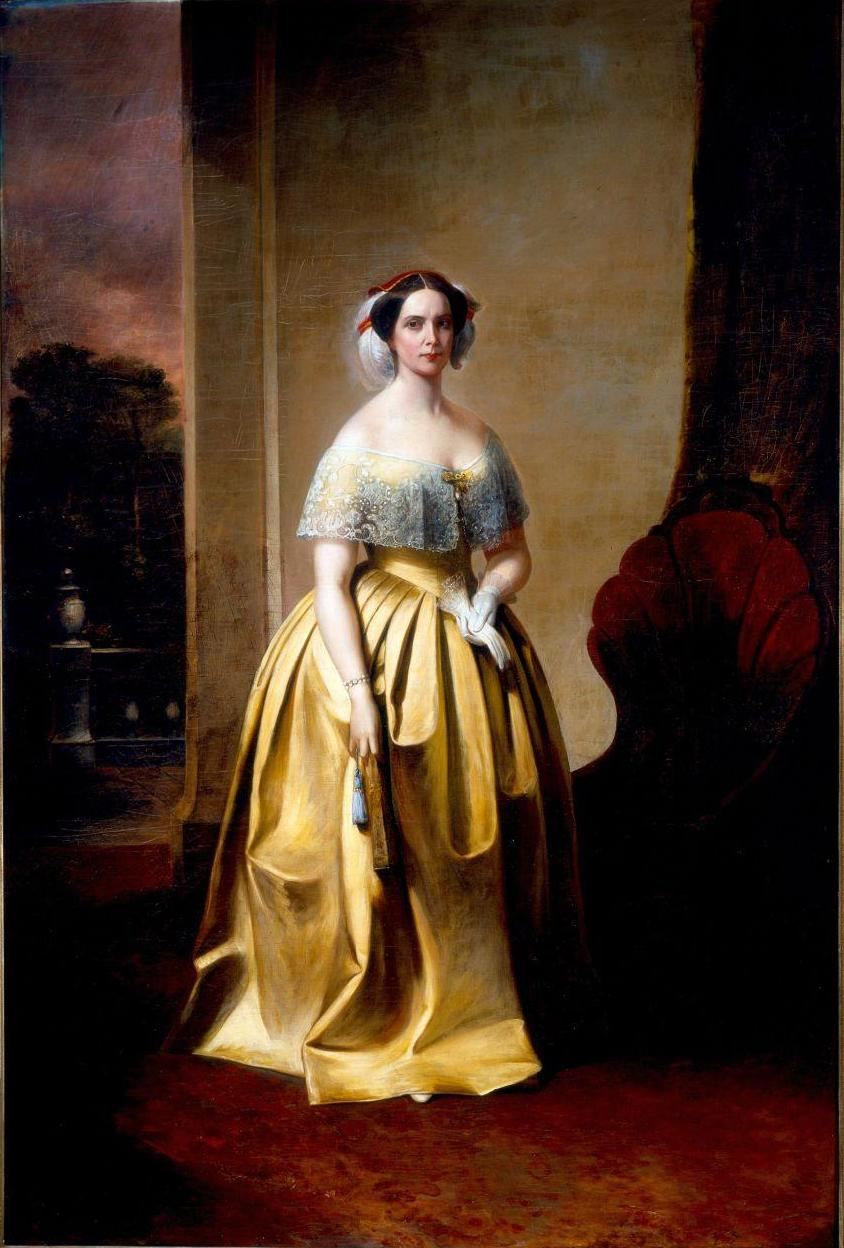
Harriet Lowndes Aiken, 1857

In 1831, Aiken married Harriet Lowndes Aiken, the daughter of Rep. Thomas Lowndes and the granddaughter of Gov. Rawlins Lowndes. Together, they had a daughter, Henrietta Aiken Rhett (1836–1918).

In 1862, Henrietta Aiken married Confederate Major Andrew Burnet Rhett, the son of Robert Barnwell Rhett, a prominent "Fire-Eater".

Following the Dred Scott decision, Aiken began traveling to more temperate Northern locations in the summer with some of his slaves, and became an early patron of the University of Minnesota, loaning it some $28,000 (approximately $750,000 in 2016 terms).

Throughout the American Civil War he was a loyal Unionist, though he never took up arms against the Southern Confederacy and his friends were nearly all Secessionists.

He was a successful businessman and planter and lived in Charleston, South Carolina. Aiken's first cousin, D. Wyatt Aiken served as a Confederate States Army officer and five-term U.S. Congressman. Aiken died at Flat Rock, NC, September 6, 1887, and was interred in Magnolia Cemetery at Charleston, South Carolina. His house, the Aiken-Rhett House, is part of the Historic Charleston foundation

== Congressional service ==
Subsequent to his service as governor, Aiken served in the U. S. House of Representatives for the Thirty-second Congress, and he was returned to the Thirty-third and Thirty-fourth Congresses, from March 4, 1851, to March 3, 1857. In December 1855, Aiken was a leading candidate for Speaker of the House of Representatives. After two months and 133 ballots, Aiken lost the race to Nathaniel P. Banks by a vote of 103 to 100, in what has been termed "the longest and most contentious Speaker election in House history". In 1866 he was elected to represent his district in the Fortieth Congress, while the state was under a provisional governor, and he was not seated.

== Jehossee Island, slavery, and wealth ==
Aiken was one of the state's wealthiest citizens and a slave owner. He inherited and grew one of the largest rice plantations in the state—Jehossee Island—with over 700 enslaved on 1,500 acres under cultivation, almost twice the acreage of the next largest plantation. By 1860, Aiken owned the entire Jehossee Island, and the plantation produced 1.5 million pounds of rice in addition to sweet potatoes and corn.

After the American Civil War, the Jehossee Plantation regained its preeminence, producing 1.2 million pounds of rice. Descendants of the Aiken family, the Maybanks, still own part of the island, having sold the remainder in 1992 to the U.S. as part of the ACE Basin National Wildlife Refuge.

After end of the American Civil War and emancipation, Aiken quickly adapted to paid labor and even increased his business after the war. He paid his formerly enslaved workers every Saturday after the war, unlike many Southern landowners who used sharecropping or debt peonage to keep freedmen trapped in near-slavery.

In an 1863 interview with Robert Smalls, a former slave and one of the first African Americans elected to the U.S. House of Representatives, Smalls said: “The only person down here who treated his people well was Governor Aiken. He gave them everything they wanted.”

Another formerly enslaved man named Elijah Green said in a 1930s interview: “Mr. Ryan had a private jail on Queen Street near the Planters’ Hotel. He was very cruel… He was the opposite to Governor Aiken who live on the northwest corner of Elizabeth and Judith streets.”

Aiken also claimed that after the war, some demoralized protectors of the Freedmen's Bureau in Beaufort sent a gunboat to his country home on Jehossee Island and looted it of all its remaining furniture and treasures. Aiken's northern interviewer wrote that “the governor's favorite sideboard stands in the house of a citizen of Boston, as a relic of the war.” Aiken also claimed, “that he had lost nearly all his property in the war (some seven or eight million dollars) but if he saved enough for his support he should not mourn the loss.”

== Unionist sentiments ==
In 1830, at the age of 24, Aiken attended a nullification dinner, where many of his peers offered toasts in support of the idea of South Carolinian independence. Thirty-one years before the outbreak of the American Civil War, Aiken stood and spoke: “The Union—Let not the hasty and ill-timed resistance on the part of the South sever forever the golden links with which we are so beautifully united."

In an 1865 interview, Aiken said, "No, I have never cast my lot with them (the secessionists). I told them they were wrong from the first. I gave a toast for the Union at a nullification supper in 1830, and offended all my young associates, and since the rebellion commenced I have not been to Richmond or Montgomery, and have declined office from Mr. Davis (President of the Confederacy) for myself and friends. When Mr. Davis was my guest recently in Charleston, I defended the Union, and scouted the absurd doctrine of secession in a conversation with him. Since the war began I have never said nor done a thing of which my conscience accuses me as an act of disloyalty to the nation."

Aiken continued, "These have been four dreadful years," ,"but I told the rebels from the beginning what the end would be. I have been disappointed in only one respect—I told them I would give them two years to be conquered in, and it has taken four. They have fought desperately; every boy partook of the fanaticism and went into the fight, and the woman cheered them on and gave their jewels and treasures to the cause. You of the North know nothing of the war in this respect. Every family in the South is bereaved, and I told them it would be so."

== Renaming of Aiken Fellows Society ==
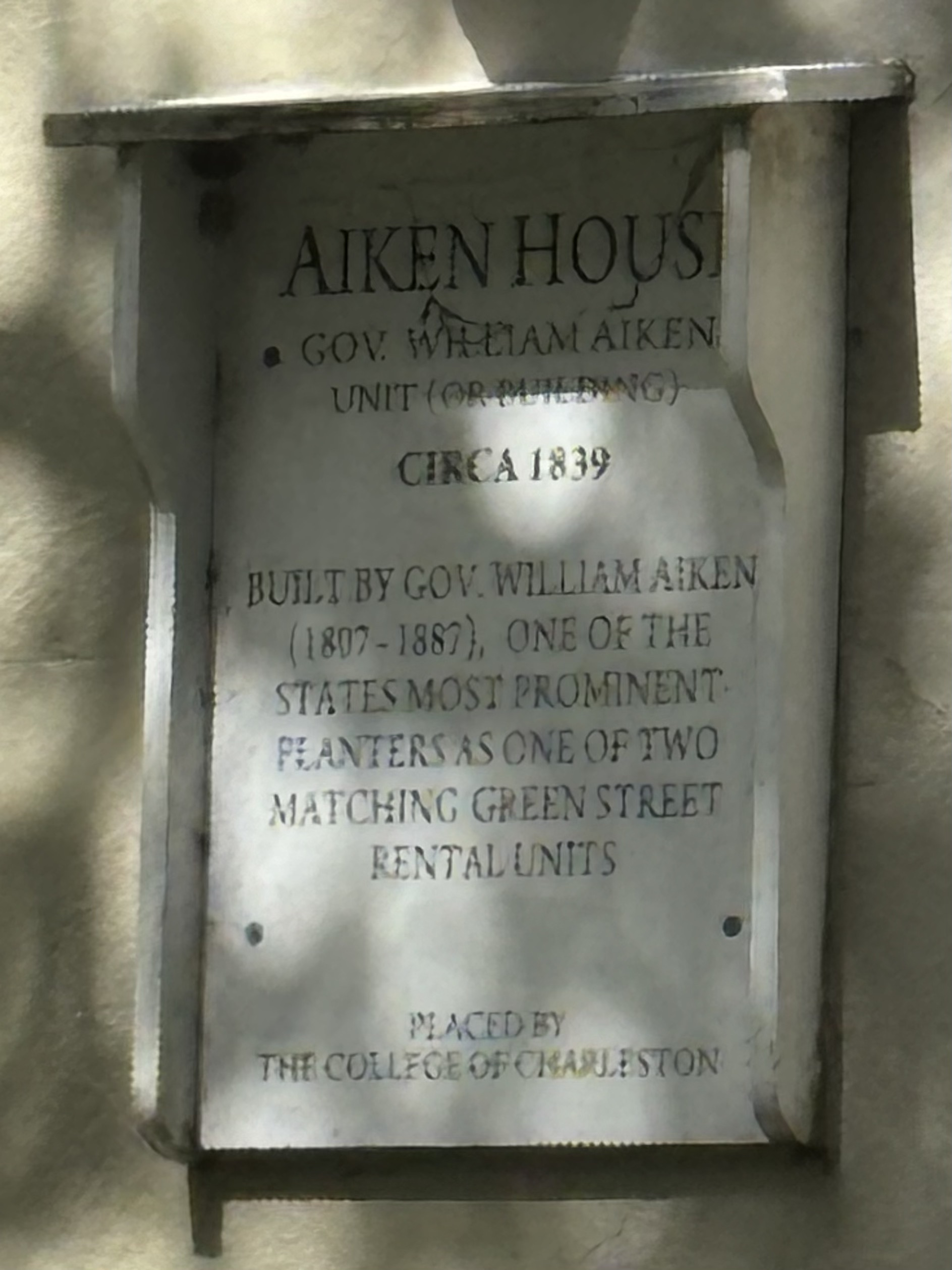
Historical marker located on the Aiken House (CofC Honors College).

In October 2020, College of Charleston President Andrew Hsu announced the removal of Aiken’s name from the Honors College’s top scholars program, renaming the "Aiken Fellows Society" to the "Charleston Fellows." This decision was made alongside the removal of Bishop Robert Smith, the college’s first president, as the namesake for one of the college's graduating student awards and donor society. Hsu wrote, "These actions, along with the forthcoming documentary, are just some of the many efforts underway to address diversity, equity and inclusion on campus. As Vice President of Inclusion and Access and Chief Diversity Officer Rénard Harris stated earlier this semester, this is a Year of Action." Harris told the City Paper he was “excited” to see the school moving away from using Aiken and Smith’s names. In March 2025, the College of Charleston announced that the Office of Institutional Diversity will be dissolved and its functions integrated into other areas of campus. The Honors College at The College of Charleston is housed in a building constructed by Aiken in 1839.

Political offices
Preceded by James Henry Hammond	Governor of South Carolina; 1844–1846	Succeeded by David Johnson
U.S. House of Representatives
Preceded by Isaac E. Holmes	Member of the U.S. House of Representatives from South Carolina's 6th congressional district 1851–1853	Succeeded by William Waters Boyce
Preceded by James Lawrence Orr	Member of the U.S. House of Representatives from South Carolina's 2nd congressional district 1853–1857	Succeeded by William Porcher Miles
