= William Aiken House and Associated Railroad Structures =

Historic house in South Carolina, United States

- U.S. National Register of Historic Places
- U.S. National Historic Landmark District
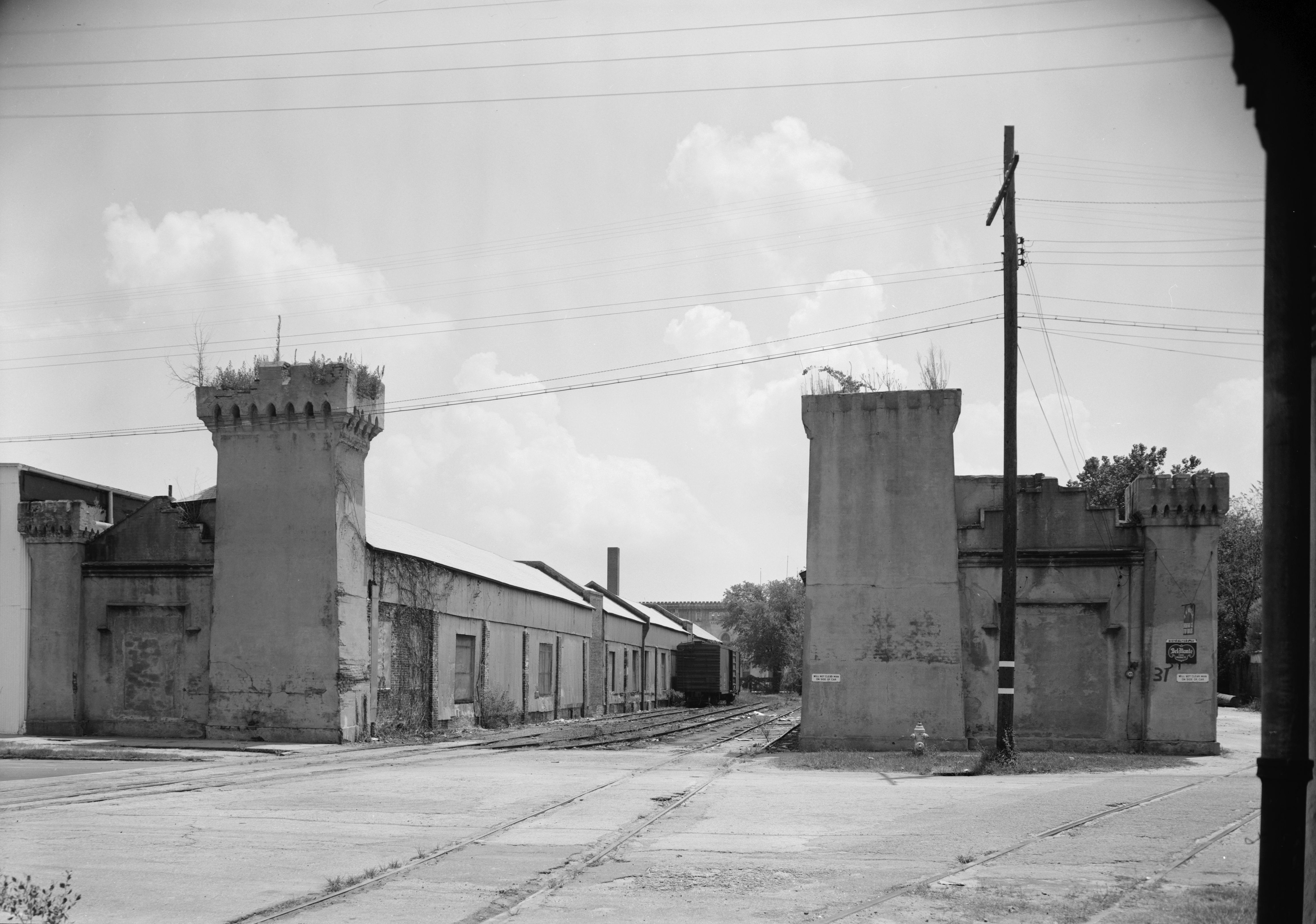
- Camden Depot (1969 HABS photo)

- Location within South Carolina Location within the United States
- Location: Properties on King, John, and Meeting Streets, Charleston, South Carolina
- Coordinates: 32°47′21″N 79°56′15″W
- Area: 27 acres (11 ha)
- Built: 1807
- NRHP reference No.: 66000698

Significant dates
- Added to NRHP: October 15, 1966
- Designated NHLD: November 4, 1963

The William Aiken House and Associated Railroad Structures make up a National Historic Landmark District in Charleston, South Carolina, that contains structures of South Carolina Canal and Railroad Company and the home of the company's founder, William Aiken. These structures make up one of the largest collection of surviving pre-Civil War railroad depot facilities in the United States. The district was declared a National Historic Landmark in 1963.

== Description and history ==
The historic district has three distinct sections. The main section is bounded by Mary, King, Meeting, and John Streets, north of Charleston's historic downtown area, and includes the Aiken House, surviving elements of the main railroad depot, and associated warehouses. A second, smaller area is located on the north side of Line Street, between King and Meeting Streets, where the company's railroad car repair and refurbishing facility was located. These two areas are joined by the former railroad right-of-way, which is still readily discernible in most of the blocks between them.

The Aiken House is located at the corner of King and Ann Streets on the west side of the main section. It is an 1807 Federal Adamesque wood-frame house, two stories high, with a two-story porch extending across its southern facade. It is where the South Carolina Canal and Railroad Company was founded in 1827, with William Aiken, an Irish immigrant, as its first president. Construction of the railroad line took place between 1830 and 1833, marred by the death of Aiken when horses drawing his carriage were frightened by construction-related noises, overturning it, and also by the explosion of the Best Friend of Charleston, the first American-made steam locomotive. When it began operation, it had the greatest length of track (136 miles (219 km)) in the world under single management. In 1929, the Southern Railway, which had taken possession of the house with its acquisition of the South Carolina Canal and Rail Road Company, removed several decorative elements such as a fireplace mantel from the Aiken House and used them in the executive offices of the Southern Railway Building, its Washington, D.C. headquarters.

There are two principal depot buildings in the district. The "Camden Depot" stands on John Street, and the "Tower Depot", now little more than a pair of crenellated towers, stands on Mary Street. These two buildings were completed in 1850, and in the area between, two warehouses were built in the following decade. The depots and one of the warehouses are architecturally distinguished by their Gothic Revival features, which are not frequently found on railroad infrastructure. The Tower Depot, which was the railroad's original passenger depot, was only used until 1853, when a through depot was built near Line Street. In 1857, the large brick Italianate car shop was built adjacent to the main railroad line just north of Line Street.

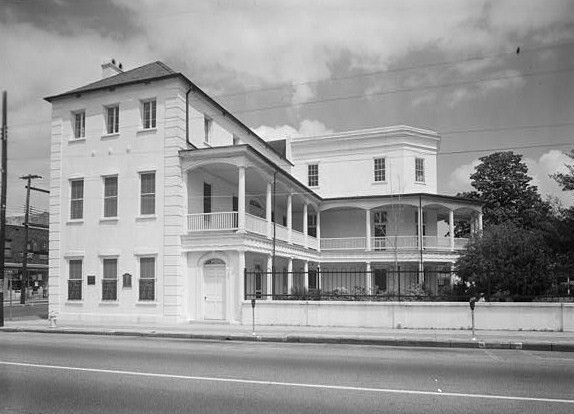
William Aiken House in 1969

== Contributing buildings ==
- William Aiken House, built in 1807. An octagonal wing added in 1831 but damaged in 1886 earthquake, and certain woodwork was removed in 1931. A servants wing is unchanged.
- A coach house at the back of gardens on the William Aiken House property
- Camden Depot, a railroad depot
- Deans Warehouse, built in 1856
- South Carolina Railroad Warehouse
- Tower Passenger Depot
- Line Street Car and Carpenter Shops
- Railroad Right-of-Way
- "Best Friend of Charleston" Replica, a replica of the first American-made steam locomotive

Non-contributing structures in the district include:

- Hughes Lumber Company Warehouse and Martshink Beer Warehouse
- Shed housing the "Best Friend of Charleston" replica locomotive
- Buildings along John Street, King Street and Meeting Street:
  - Chicco Apartment Buildings A and B
  - 39-4, 39-B, 39-C John Street
  - 41-B, 43, 51 John Street
  - numerous buildings in 424-492 King Street
  - Brick building at Meeting Street and Ann Street
  - Lilienthal's Stained Glass
  - 365-371 Meeting Street

== Gallery ==
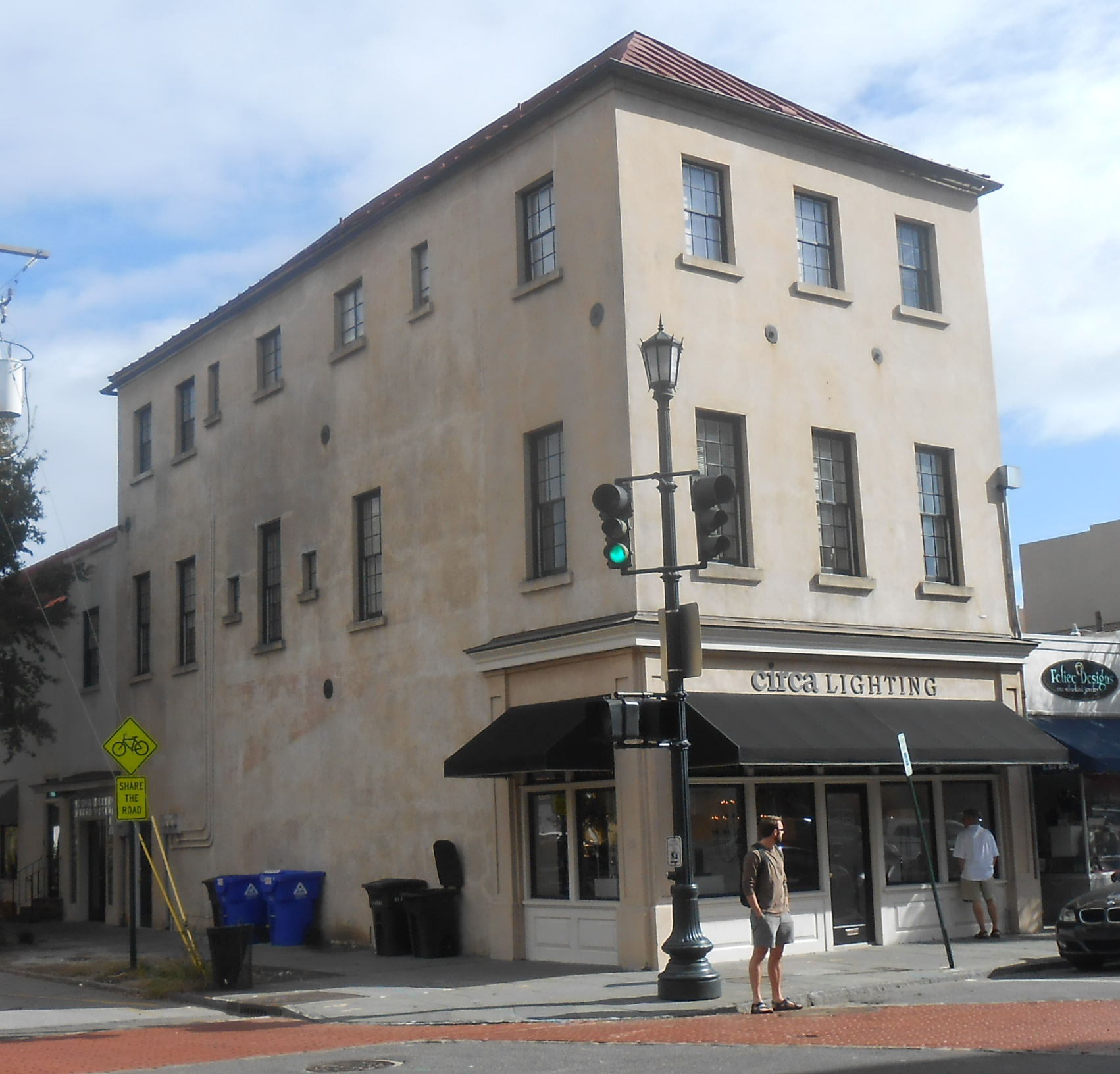
426 King Street

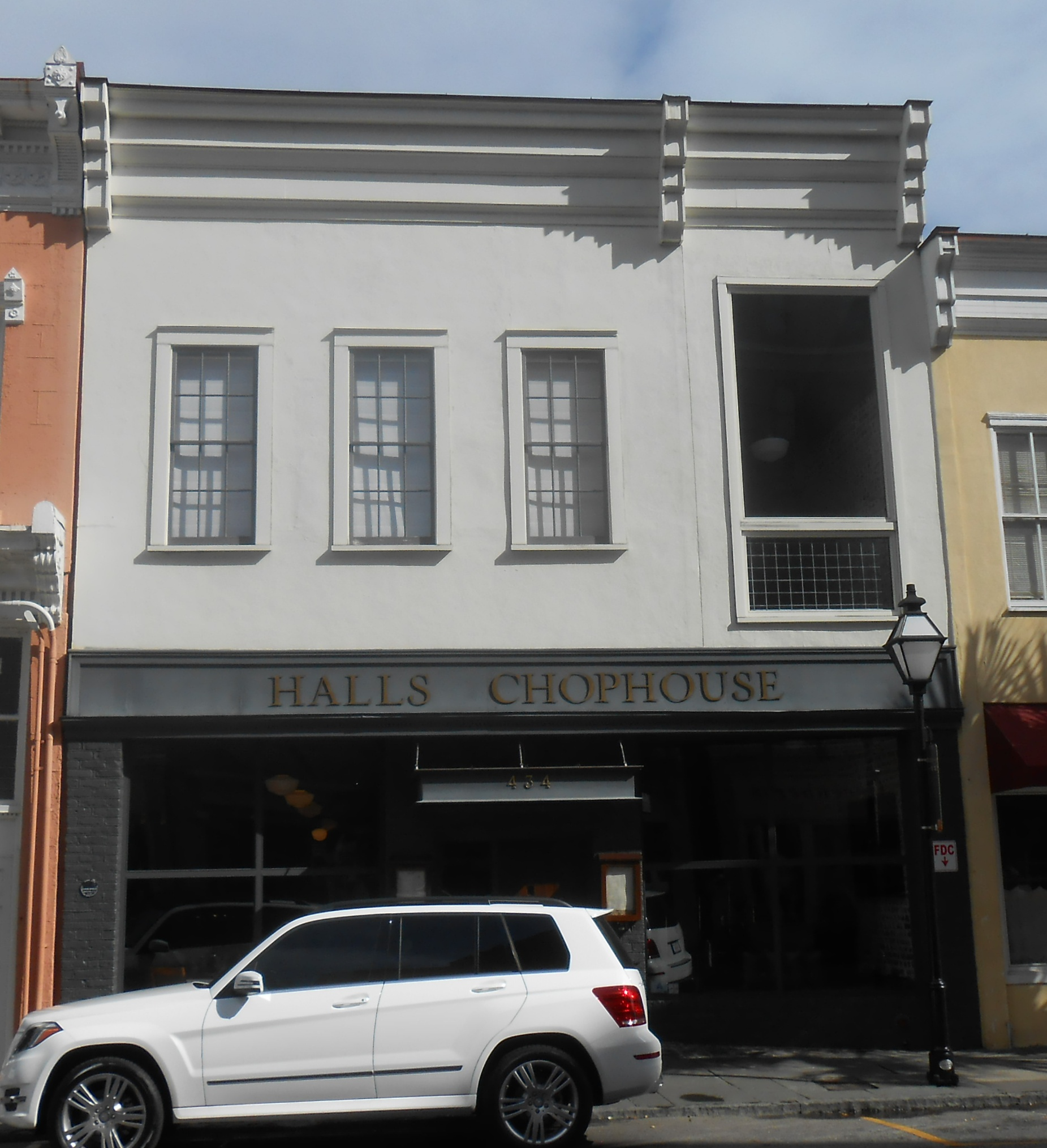
434 King Street

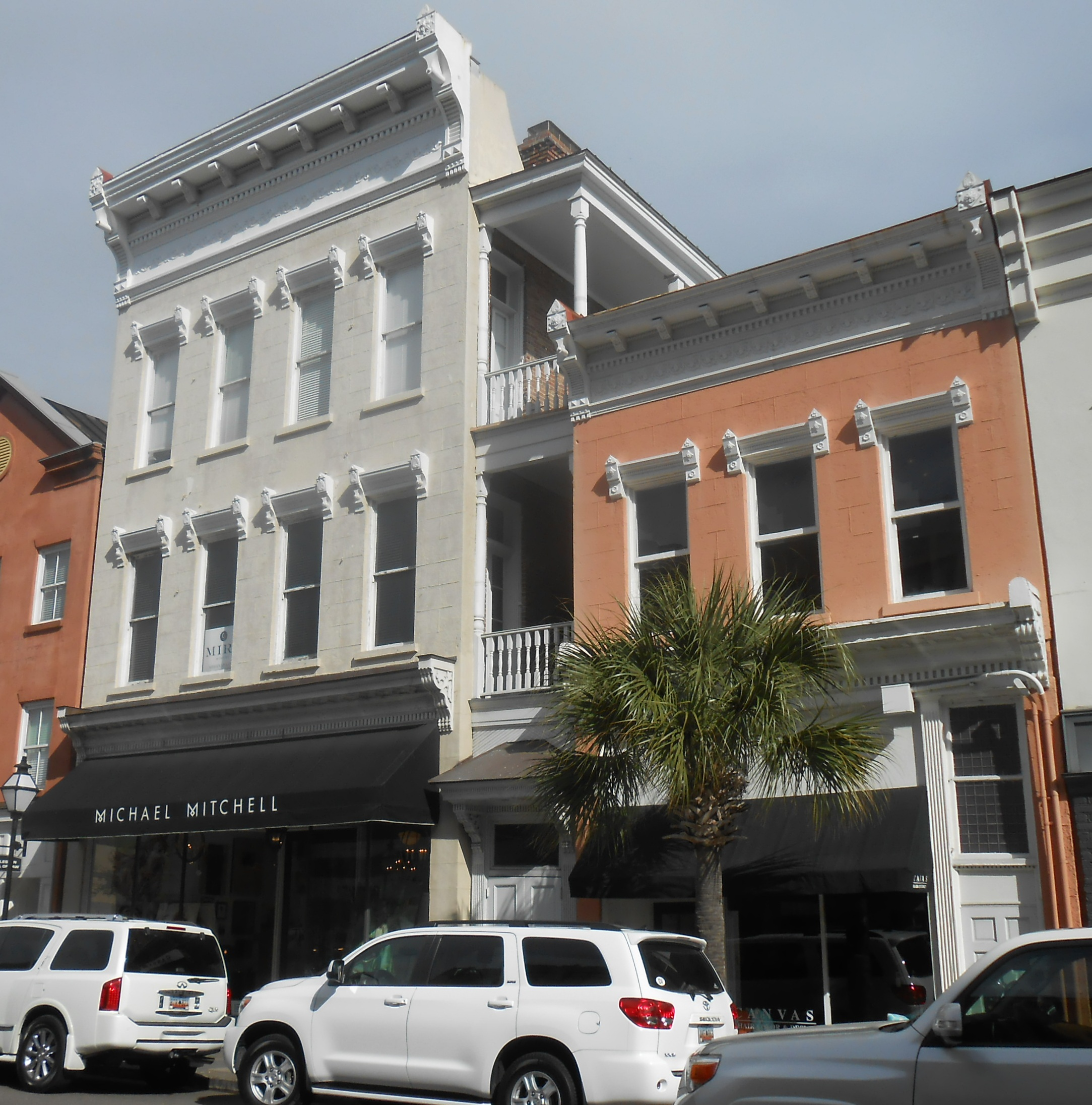
436 (right) and 438 (left) King Street

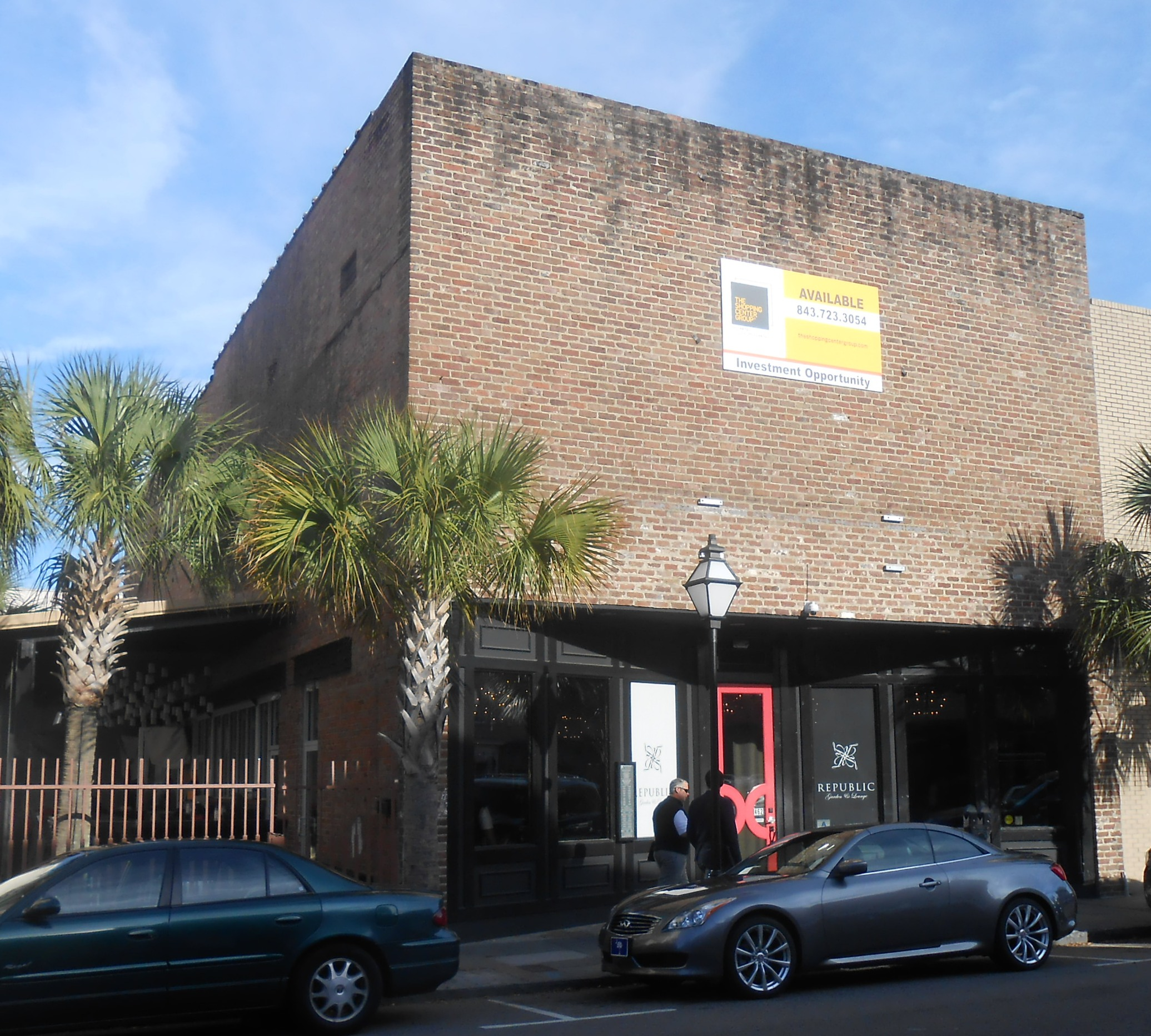
464 King Street

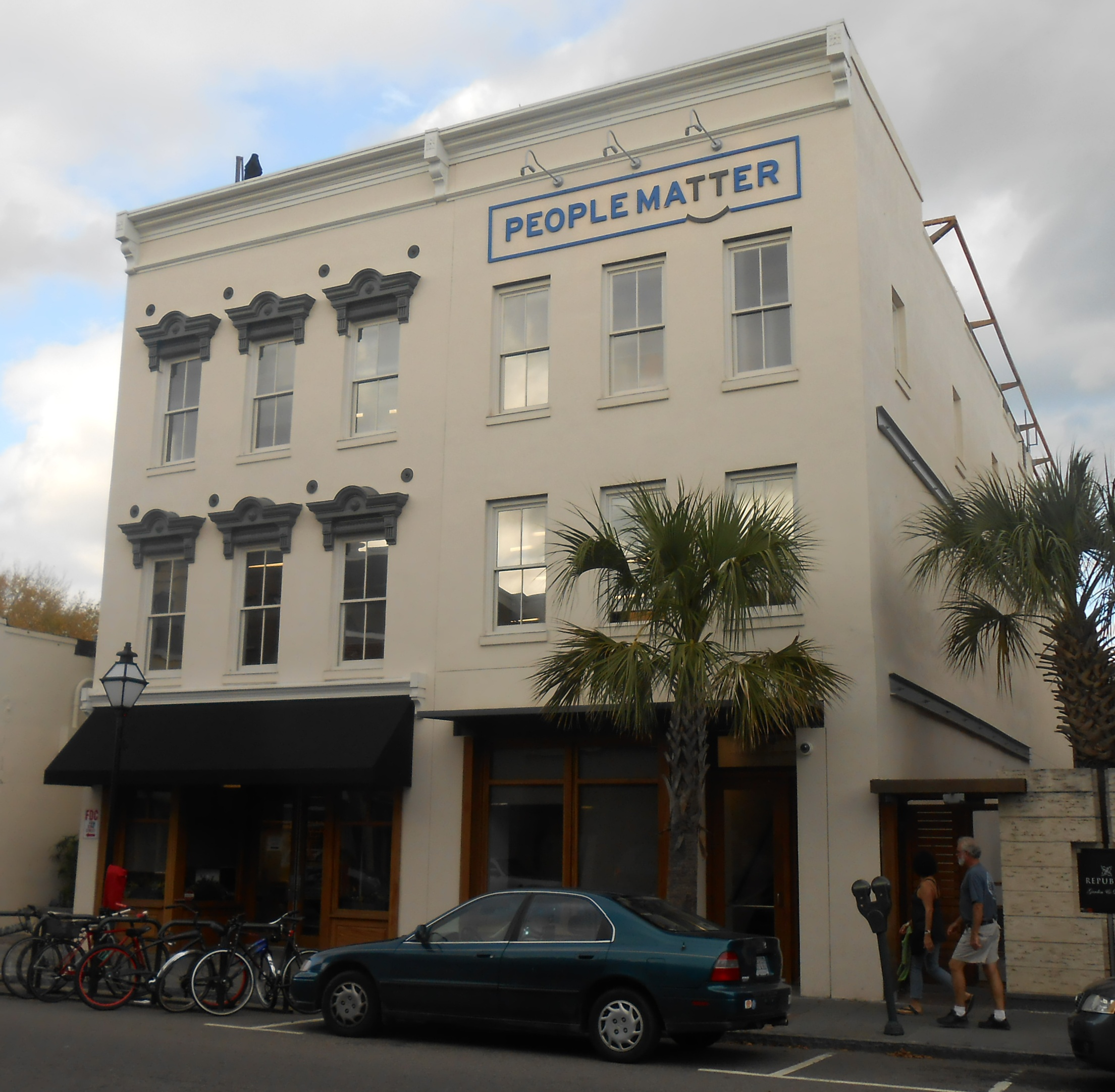
466 King Street

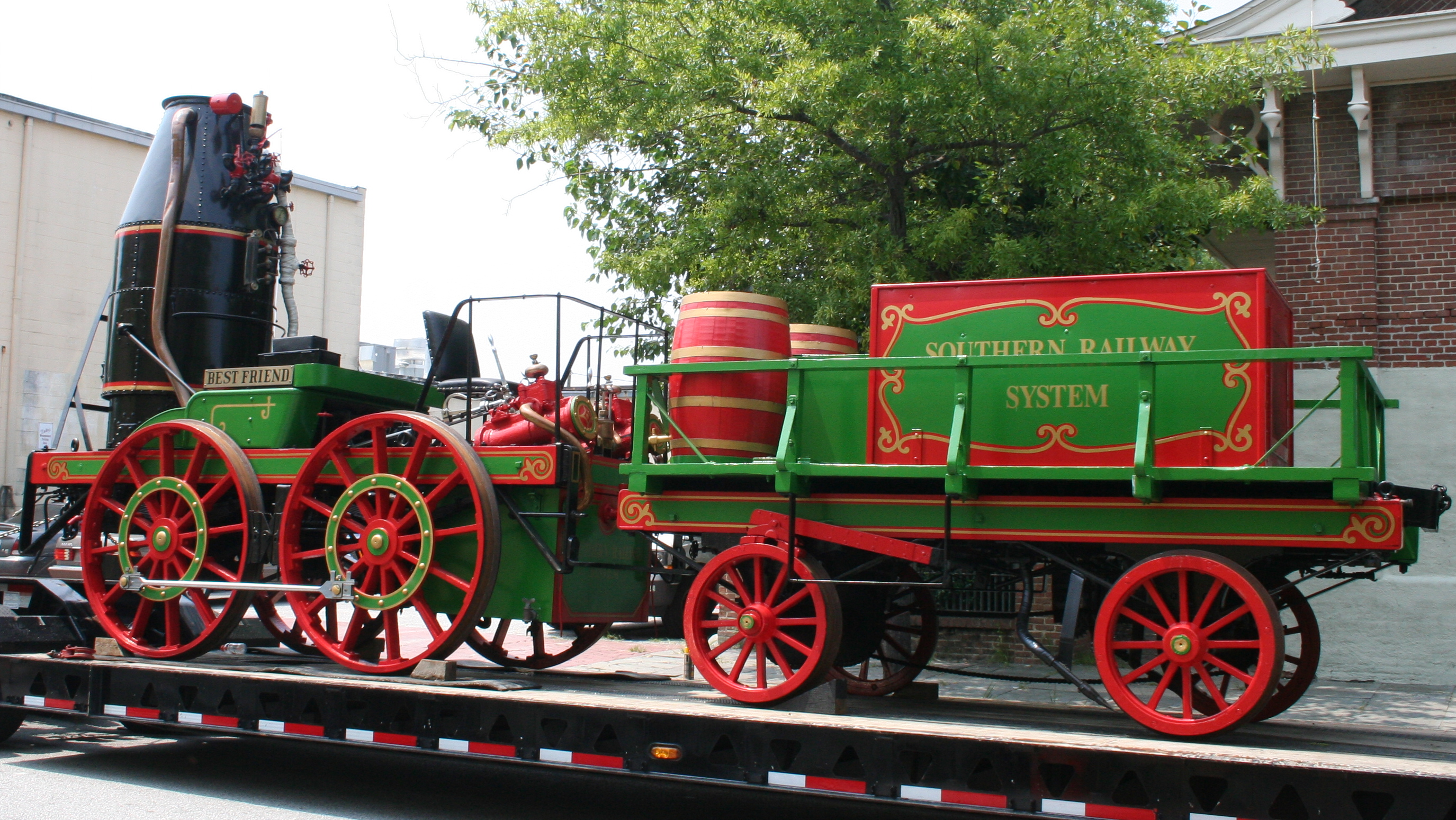
A replica of the Best Friend of Charleston engine and tender are loaded on a truck for transport to Norfolk Southern in Atlanta – August 6, 2007.

== See also ==
- Gov. William Aiken House, home of his son
- List of National Historic Landmarks in South Carolina
- National Register of Historic Places listings in Charleston, South Carolina
