= William W. Boyce =

American politician and lawyer (1818–1890)

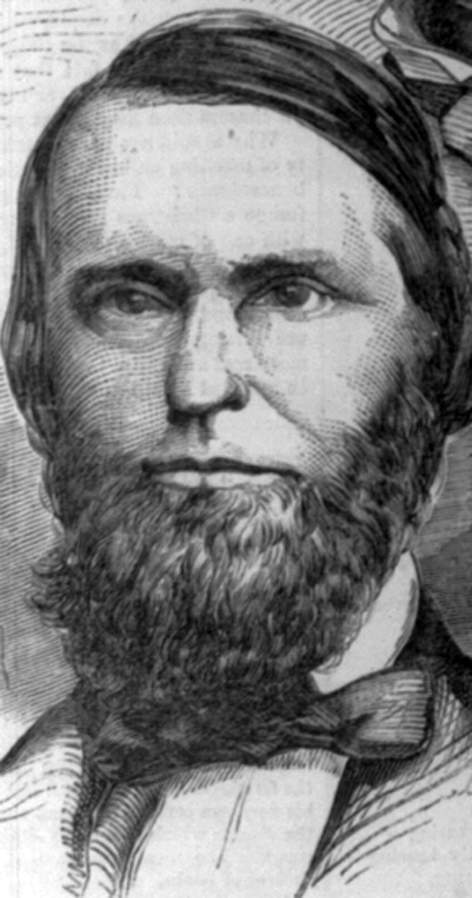
- Boyce, c. 1860

Member of the C.S. House of Representatives from South Carolina's 6th district
- In office February 18, 1862 – March 18, 1865
- Preceded by: Position established
- Succeeded by: Position abolished

Member of the C.S. Congress from South Carolina
- In office February 8, 1861 – February 17, 1862
- Preceded by: Position established
- Succeeded by: Position abolished

Member of the U.S. House of Representatives from South Carolina's 6th district
- In office March 4, 1853 – December 21, 1860
- Preceded by: William Aiken
- Succeeded by: Position abolished George Dargan (1883)

Member of the South Carolina House of Representatives
- In office 1846–1847

Personal details
- Born: William Waters Boyce; October 24, 1818 Charleston, South Carolina, US
- Died: February 3, 1890 (aged 71) Fairfax County, Virginia, US
- Party: Democratic
- Relations: Ker Boyce (uncle)
- Occupation: Politician, lawyer

William Waters Boyce (October 24, 1818 – February 3, 1890) was an American politician and lawyer. A Democrat, he was a member of the United States House of Representatives from South Carolina, later a member of the Provisional Congress of the Confederate States and the Confederate States House of Representatives.

== Early life ==
Boyce was born on October 24, 1818, in Charleston, South Carolina, the son of Robert Boyce and Lydia (née Waters) Boyce. He was the nephew of industrialist Ker Boyce.

Boyce studied at the University of South Carolina and the University of Virginia. He read law, and in 1839, was admitted to the bar, after which he began practicing law in Winnsboro. He owned slaves. John D. Smart (1842–1908), an African American carpenter and builder of the Winnsboro clock tower, said that Boyce was kind to his slaves.

== Politics ==
Boyce was a Democrat. In 1846 and 1847, he was a member of the North Carolina House of Representatives. He was a member of the United States House of Representatives, representing South Carolina's 6th district. He served from March 4, 1853, to December 21, 1860, resigning due to Southern secession; he originally opposed secession. During the 35th Congress, he was chairman of the Committee on Elections. Politically, he was liberal.

At the onset of the American Civil War, Boyce volunteered to the Confederate States Army, though was selected for Confederate politics. He was a delegate to the Provisional Congress of the Confederate States from South Carolina February 8, 1861, to February 17, 1862, and served as a member of the Confederate States House of Representatives, from February 17, 1862, to March 18, 1865. While serving, he was a member of the Committee on Naval Affairs.

Boyce opposed President Jefferson Davis. In late 1864, he and other Confederate politicians authored a letter calling for Confederate surrender; the letter was received negatively for the most part. It is believed to have greatly contributed to the death of Confederate war morale.

== Personal life and death ==
In 1866, Boyrce moved to Washington, D.C., practicing law there. He was married to Mary Elizabeth Pearson, with whom he had two daughters. He died on February 3, 1890, aged 71, at "Ashland", in Fairfax County, Virginia. He was buried on February 6, at St. John's Episcopal Cemetery, in Winnsboro.

U.S. House of Representatives
Preceded by William Aiken, Jr.	Member of the U.S. House of Representatives from South Carolina's 6th congressional district 1853–1860	Succeeded by District abolished George W. Dargan (1883)
Political offices
Preceded by Position established	Deputy in the C.S. Congress from South Carolina; February 8, 1861 – February 17, 1862	Succeeded by Position abolished
