= National Register of Historic Places listings in Aiken County, South Carolina =

Location of Aiken County in South Carolina

This is a list of the National Register of Historic Places listings in Aiken County, South Carolina.

This is intended to be a complete list of the properties and districts on the National Register of Historic Places in Aiken County, South Carolina, United States. The locations of National Register properties and districts for which the latitude and longitude coordinates are included below, may be seen on a map.

There are 46 properties and districts listed on the National Register in the county, including 1 National Historic Landmark.

This National Park Service list is complete through NPS recent listings posted October 23, 2026.

== Current listings ==
	Name on the Register	Image	Date listed	Location	City or town	Description
1	Aiken Colored Cemetery	Aiken Colored Cemetery	March 19, 2007 (#07000182)	Florence St. and Hampton Ave. 33°33′54″N 81°43′55″W	Aiken	
2	Aiken County Hospital		September 13, 2021 (#100006888)	828 Richland Ave. West; 33°33′57″N 81°43′45″W	Aiken	
3	Aiken Mile Track	Aiken Mile Track	May 9, 1985 (#85000991)	Banks Mill Rd. 33°32′39″N 81°41′57″W	Aiken	
4	Aiken Training Track	Aiken Training Track	May 9, 1985 (#85000992)	Two Notch Rd. 33°32′35″N 81°42′30″W	Aiken	
5	Aiken Winter Colony Historic District I	Aiken Winter Colony Historic District I	November 27, 1984 (#84000484)	Off U.S. Routes 1/78; 33°32′59″N 81°44′29″W	Aiken	
6	Aiken Winter Colony Historic District II	Aiken Winter Colony Historic District II	November 27, 1984 (#84000498)	Roughly bounded by railroad tracks, Colleton and 3rd Aves., and Laurens, South Boundary, and Marion Sts. 33°33′16″N 81°43′15″W	Aiken	
7	Aiken Winter Colony Historic District III	Aiken Winter Colony Historic District III	November 27, 1984 (#84000508)	Roughly bounded by Edgefield Ave., Highland Park Dr., Fauburg, and Greenville St. 33°33′47″N 81°43′40″W	Aiken	
8	Chancellor James P. Carroll House	Chancellor James P. Carroll House	November 23, 1977 (#77001209)	112 Gregg Ave. 33°33′59″N 81°45′28″W	Aiken	
9	The Cedars	The Cedars	June 17, 1993 (#93000539)	U.S. Route 278, 0.3 miles east of South Carolina Highway 125; 33°25′38″N 81°52′50″W	Beech Island	
10	Chinaberry	Chinaberry	April 29, 1982 (#82003826)	441 York St., SE. 33°33′11″N 81°43′18″W	Aiken	
11	Coker Spring	Coker Spring	January 18, 1978 (#78002490)	Coker Spring Rd. 33°32′59″N 81°43′37″W	Aiken	
12	Commercial Hotel	Commercial Hotel	December 30, 2024 (#100011230)	235 Richland Avenue West; 33°33′41″N 81°43′19″W	Aiken	
13	Court Tennis Building	Court Tennis Building	November 27, 1984 (#84000513)	Newberry and Park Sts. 33°33′34″N 81°43′17″W	Aiken	
14	Crossways	Crossways	June 4, 1997 (#97000536)	450 E. Boundary St. 33°32′47″N 81°42′06″W	Aiken	
15	Dawson-Vanderhorst House	Dawson-Vanderhorst House	June 29, 1976 (#76001685)	Northeast of Aiken at the junction of Wire and New Bridge Rds. 33°34′49″N 81°40′57″W	Aiken vicinity	
16	Fort Moore-Savano Town Site		August 14, 1973 (#73001670)	West of Beech Island on the Savannah River; 33°25′53″N 81°54′37″W	Beech Island vicinity	
17	Gaston Livery Stable		February 27, 2020 (#100005001)	1315 Richland Ave. East; 33°33′15″N 81°42′09″W	Aiken	
18	Georgia Avenue-Butler Avenue Historic District	Georgia Avenue-Butler Avenue Historic District	April 5, 1984 (#84002017)	Georgia and Butler Aves. and Martintown Rd. 33°30′15″N 81°57′52″W	North Augusta	
19	Graniteville Historic District	Graniteville Historic District	June 2, 1978 (#78002491)	South Carolina Highway 19 and Gregg St. 33°34′03″N 81°48′24″W	Graniteville	
20	Charles Hammond House	Charles Hammond House	October 2, 1973 (#73001672)	908 Martintown Rd., W. 33°31′33″N 81°58′47″W	North Augusta	
21	Hickman Mill Historic District	Hickman Mill Historic District	February 23, 2016 (#16000046)	Bounded by Marshall, Canal, and Hard Streets, and Horse Creek; 33°33′54″N 81°48′33″W	Graniteville	
22	Immanuel School	Immanuel School	June 3, 2009 (#09000389)	120 York St., NE; 33°33′38″N 81°43′03″W	Aiken	
23	Joye Cottage	Joye Cottage	September 29, 1980 (#80003651)	463 Whiskey Rd. and 129 1st Ave. 33°33′12″N 81°43′25″W	Aiken	
24	Legare-Morgan House	Legare-Morgan House	September 22, 1977 (#77001210)	241 Lauren St., SW. 33°33′23″N 81°43′30″W	Aiken	
25	Lookaway Hall	Lookaway Hall	August 13, 1992 (#92000962)	103 W. Forest Ave. 33°29′56″N 81°58′08″W	North Augusta	
26	McGhee Block		January 30, 2024 (#100009883)	201-209 Richland Avenue W 33°33′40″N 81°43′16″W	Aiken	
27	Britton Mims Place		June 4, 1997 (#97000539)	229 Edgefield Rd. 33°31′27″N 81°56′59″W	North Augusta	
28	Oakland Plantation	Oakland Plantation	August 19, 2011 (#10001219)	2930 Storm Branch Rd. 33°26′59″N 81°50′17″W	Beech Island vicinity	
29	Ocean Grove School		May 15, 2024 (#100010365)	Southeast of 12 Ocean Grove Road. near intersection with Shaw's Fork Rd. 33°37′14″N 81°35′53″W	Aiken vicinity	
30	Phelps House	Phelps House	June 10, 1974 (#74001819)	Barnwell Ave. 33°33′56″N 81°43′29″W	Aiken	
31	Pickens House	Pickens House	May 19, 1983 (#83002182)	101 Gregg Ave. 33°33′55″N 81°45′39″W	Aiken	
32	Redcliffe	Redcliffe	May 8, 1973 (#73001671)	1.5 miles northeast of Beech Island on South Carolina Highway 125; 33°25′06″N 81°52′15″W	Beech Island vicinity	
33	Rosemary Hall	Rosemary Hall	April 28, 1975 (#75001685)	804 Carolina Ave. 33°29′49″N 81°58′12″W	North Augusta	
34	St. Mary Help of Christians Church	St. Mary Help of Christians Church	March 25, 1982 (#82003827)	York St. and Park Ave. 33°33′28″N 81°43′11″W	Aiken	
35	St. Thaddeus Episcopal Church	St. Thaddeus Episcopal Church	November 27, 1984 (#84000518)	Pendleton and Richland Sts. 33°33′41″N 81°43′30″W	Aiken	
36	Salley Historic District	Salley Historic District	October 27, 2000 (#00000554)	Bounded by Pine, Ferguson, Poplar, and Aldrich Sts. 33°33′56″N 81°18′17″W	Salley	
37	Silver Bluff		November 1, 1977 (#77001211)	Silver Bluff Rd. on the Savannah River; 33°18′38″N 81°50′38″W	Jackson vicinity	
38	South Carolina Railroad		September 23, 2021 (#100006995)	Address Restricted	Aiken vicinity	
39	US Court House-Aiken, South Carolina	US Court House-Aiken, South Carolina	December 10, 2003 (#03001288)	223 Park Ave., SE. 33°33′32″N 81°43′23″W	Aiken	
40	Vaucluse Mill Village Historic District	Vaucluse Mill Village Historic District	May 7, 1996 (#96000494)	South Carolina Highway 191, 3 miles north of Graniteville and 6 miles west of Aiken; 33°36′54″N 81°48′12″W	Vaucluse	
41	B.C. Wall House	B.C. Wall House	November 27, 1992 (#92001632)	1008 West Ave. 33°30′08″N 81°58′18″W	North Augusta	
42	Warren Mill	Warren Mill	September 27, 2016 (#16000678)	Cty. Rd. P-1201 & SC 421; 33°33′07″N 81°48′31″W	Warrenville	
43	Warrenville Elementary School	Warrenville Elementary School	May 22, 2002 (#02000560)	115 Timmerman St. 33°32′53″N 81°48′24″W	Warrenville	
44	Whitehall	Whitehall	November 27, 1984 (#84000527)	902 Magnolia St. 33°32′31″N 81°43′11″W	Aiken	
45	Willcox's	Willcox's	March 19, 1982 (#82003828)	Colleton Ave. 33°33′25″N 81°43′19″W	Aiken	
46	Zubly Cemetery	Zubly Cemetery	January 28, 2002 (#01001548)	Forrest Dr. 33°24′20″N 81°54′02″W	Beech Island vicinity	

== See also ==
- List of National Historic Landmarks in South Carolina
- National Register of Historic Places listings in South Carolina
