= Arthur Young (accountant) =

One of the founders of Ernst & Young

- Born: 16 December 1863; Glasgow, Scotland
- Died: 3 April 1948 (aged 84); Crossways, Aiken, South Carolina, United States
- Education: University of Glasgow

Robert Arthur Young (17 December 1863 – 3 April 1948) was a Scottish American. He was one of the founders of Ernst & Young, the international accounting firm.

== Early life ==
Young was born on 17 December 1863 in Scotland. He was the son of a Glasgow merchant and shipowner. His nephew, Sir Arthur Young, was a Member of Parliament and former Chamberlain of the King's Household.

He was educated at the University of Glasgow where he studied law, was the captain of the University rugby team and played for Glasgow in an inter-city rugby match. He graduated MA in 1883 and LLB in 1887.

== Career ==
He apprenticed with Glasgow solicitors A. J. & A. Graham before moving to the United States in 1890. In 1894, he began the practice of public accounting in Chicago with C. W. Stuart under the firm name Stuart & Young. In 1903, he helped secure the passage of the first C.P.A. law in Illinois and later served as president of the Illinois Society of Certified Public Accountants.

In 1906, he bought out Stuart's interest in the firm and together with his brother Stanley Young, founded the accountancy firm Arthur Young & Co. in Chicago. In 1924 Young innovated by forging an international network with Broads Paterson & Co in the UK. He retired shortly after that and died in 1948.

== Personal life ==
In 1917, he moved from Chicago to New York City, where he resided at 815 Park Avenue on Manhattan's Upper East Side. In 1927, he purchased "Crossways," a pre-1860 Late Victorian-style residence on South Boundary Street in Aiken, South Carolina from Dr. H. J. Ray for $40,000. The home was listed on the National Register of Historic Places in 1997.

Young, who never married, was "remembered in a social setting for his loose fitting tweed clothes from Whitaker & Company in London, pipe smoking and martinis, elaborate meals at Aiken with his cook Margaret Beckford, and his many dogs." He died at his residence in Aiken on 3 April 1948. He was buried at Bethany Cemetery in Aiken.

His memoirs, entitled Arthur Young and the Business he Founded, were privately printed in 1948 by J. C. Burton and published by Merrymount Press in Boston.
