= Hickman Mill Historic District =

Historic district in South Carolina, United States

- U.S. National Register of Historic Places
- U.S. Historic district
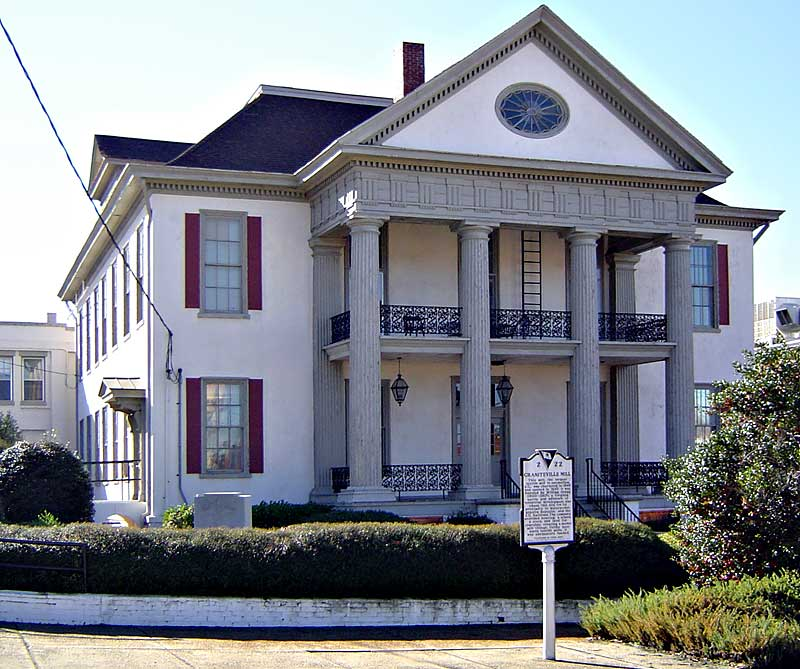
- Hickman Memorial Hall

- Location within South Carolina Location within the United States
- Location: Bounded by Marshall, Canal, and Hard Streets, and Horse Creek, Graniteville, South Carolina
- Coordinates: 33°33′54″N 81°48′33″W
- Area: 11.85 acres (4.80 ha)
- Built: 1900; 126 years ago
- Architect: Lockwood Greene & Co.
- Architectural style: Classical Revival; Early 20th Century Commercial
- NRHP reference No.: 16000046
- Added to NRHP: February 23, 2016

The Hickman Mill Historic District encompasses an early 20th-century textile mill complex in Graniteville, South Carolina. It is located just south of the older Graniteville Mill, and is bounded on the north by Marshall Street, the east by Canal Street, and the south by Hard Street. The complex includes a large brick mill building, and the Classical Revival Hickman Memorial Hall. The mill was built by Tracy Hickman, whose father had succeeded William Gregg at the helm of the Graniteville Mill. The hall was built in 1908 as a place to provide recreational and cultural opportunities to the mill workers.

The district was listed on the National Register of Historic Places in 2016.

== See also ==
- National Register of Historic Places listings in Aiken County, South Carolina
