= Sawilowsky =

Sawilowsky is a surname. Notable people with the surname include:

- Pat Sawilowsky (1930–2014), American administrator
- Shlomo Sawilowsky (1954-2021), American statistician, son of Pat
