= Chinaberry (disambiguation) =

Chinaberry, Melia azedarach, is a species of deciduous tree in the mahogany family.

Chinaberry may also refer to:

- Actaea rubra, an herbaceous plant sometimes known as chinaberry
- Sapindus, a genus of trees sometimes known as chinaberry
- Chinaberry (Aiken, South Carolina), a house listed on the U.S. National Register of Historic Places
- USS Chinaberry (AN-61), a U.S. Navy net-laying ship
