= Willcox's =

Historic house in South Carolina, United States

- U.S. National Register of Historic Places
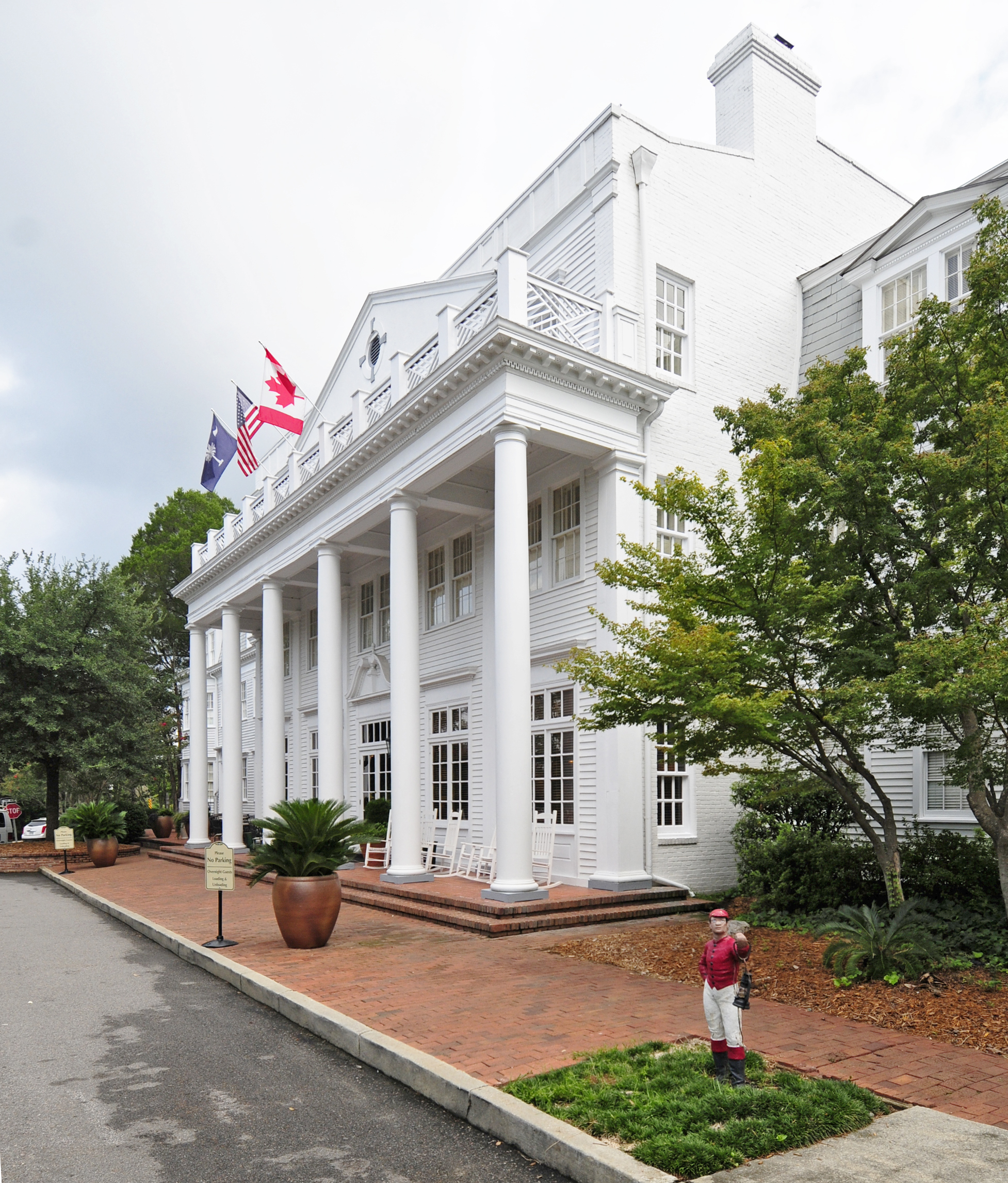
- Willcox's, August 2012

- Location within South Carolina Location within the United States
- Location: Colleton Ave, Aiken, South Carolina, US
- Coordinates: 33°33′25″N 81°43′19″W
- Area: 6 acres (2.4 ha)
- Built: 1928; 98 years ago
- Architectural style: Colonial Revival
- NRHP reference No.: 82003828
- Added to NRHP: March 19, 1982

Willcox's, located in Aiken, South Carolina, US, was an internationally known inn during the Aiken Winter Colony heyday. Operated from 1898 to 1957 by members of the Willcox family, the still-magnificent building reflects the influence of both Second Empire and Colonial Revival styles of architecture. The plan of the building is irregular in shape, consisting of a central block with asymmetrical wings. Of Aiken's once famous resort hostelries, only Willcox's is still standing. The landmark property was listed on the National Register of Historic Places March 19, 1982.

== History ==
In 1891 the Englishman Frederick Willcox, his Swedish wife Elise Wellborn, and their two sons, Frederick and Albert came to Aiken.

The family built a house on the northwest corner of Chesterfield Street and Colleton Avenue and established a catering company in their home. Elise became known for her preparation of fine foods and the business was patronized by Aiken "Winter Colony" families, founders and heirs to fortunes made during the American Industrial Revolution.

=== Highland Park Hotel fire ===
At about this same time, in 1898, the first Highland Park Hotel burned. It had been a notable structure that housed many winter colonists who had not yet built a "cottage" in Aiken. (A mansion in any other sense, Winter Colony "cottages" were the second or third homes of families who had great estates on Long Island, Park Avenue in Manhattan and other wealthy enclaves in the Eastern United States.

On the loss of the hotel, Mrs. Thomas (Louise) Hitchcock persuaded the Willcoxes to open a small hotel and in 1900 it welcomed its first guests. It expanded in 1906 by incorporating an adjacent two story house into the hotel. A further expansion in 1928 An increasing demand for accommodations led Willcox to add to the inn in 1906, when an adjacent two-story house at Colleton Avenue and Newberry Street became part of the hotel. In 1928, a further expansion and renovation to the west wing brought the hotel to its current appearance.

When Frederick died in 1924, his son Albert (Bert) Willcox managed the inn until it closed in 1957.

=== World War II ===
With World War II travel restrictions in the early 1940s, The Willcox fell on hard times and closed in the early 1950s. It was sold at auction in 1957 and over the following 20 years was sporadically repaired, but remained boarded until its renovation and reopening in 1985 as The Willcox Inn.

In a history of St. Thaddeus Episcopal Church by Mac McClearen and Owen Sheetz, it is written, "The famous old Willcox Inn drew its guest list from diplomats, society leaders, visiting European royalty, wealthy sportsmen and members of the entertainment world. The Winston Churchills visited; Count and Countess Bernadotte of Sweden spent their honeymoon at the Willcox, John Jacob Astor, Evelyn Walsh McLean (owner of the Hope diamond), makeup queen Elizabeth Arden, singer Andy Williams, dancer Irene Castle, Doris Duke, Franklin D. Roosevelt and Bing Crosby – all came to the Willcox to enjoy the leisurely life that Aiken had to offer. "

=== The Willcox today ===
In 2000 the hotel was purchased by the Garrett Hotel Group and reopened in 2002 as The Willcox. In 2009 the ownership changed when restaurateurs Geoffrey & Shannon Ellis purchased The Willcox.

The Willcox has become one of South Carolina's most luxurious small hotels. In 2016 it was ranked by Travel + Leisure as the 7th best hotel in the world and the best in the South. In addition to rooms, the hotel features a restaurant, bar, spa, horse boarding and rents nearby houses for vacation rentals. It also offers vacation packages which include horseback riding, golf, polo and trap and skeet shooting.
