= Graniteville Historic District (South Carolina) =

Historic district in South Carolina, United States

- U.S. National Register of Historic Places
- U.S. National Historic Landmark District
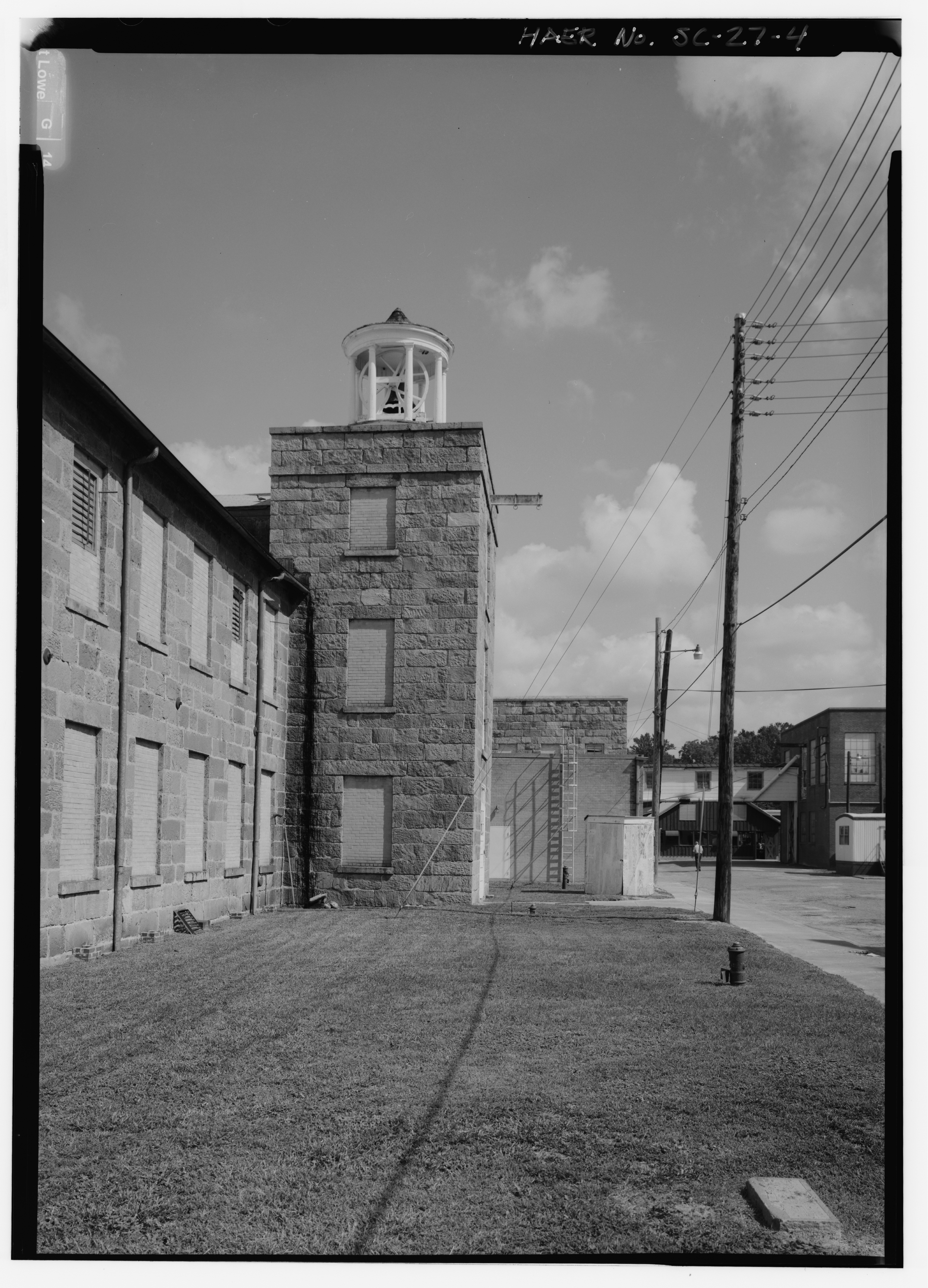
- View of the old mill tower

- Location within South Carolina Location within the United States
- Location: SC 191 and Gregg Street, Graniteville, South Carolina
- Coordinates: 33°34′0″N 81°48′30″W
- Area: 55 acres (22 ha)
- Built: 1846; 180 years ago
- Built by: William Gregg
- Architect: J. B. White
- Architectural style: Carpenter Gothic
- NRHP reference No.: 78002491

Significant dates
- Added to NRHP: June 2, 1978
- Designated NHLD: June 2, 1978

The Graniteville Historic District encompasses one of the first textile company towns to be established in the Southern United States. Built in the late 1840s by William Gregg near Aiken, South Carolina, and now known as Graniteville, it was modeled after New England mill towns. Gregg used the success of this enterprise to advocate for the industrialization of the South, laying the groundwork for its eventual domination of the American textile industry. The district, which includes the original canal, mill building, mill worker housing, and a period church, was designated a National Historic Landmark District in 1978.

== Description and history ==
William Gregg (1800-1867) had already had a successful career as a jeweler by the time he became involved in the textile industry in the 1840s. After touring New England and seeing its textile mills and industrial towns, he began advocating that the states of the Southern United States should industrialize to compete economically with the north. Gregg obtained financing from Charleston financiers to establish a model textile business, which would (controversially for the slavery-dominated South) employ white laborers.

Between 1845 and 1849 Gregg supervised the construction of a mile-long power canal, drawing water from Horse Creek and Bridge Creek, a mill building, schoolhouse, and 100 Carpenter Gothic wood frame worker housing units (of which 26 survive in good condition). He made available lots of land within the development for the construction of churches, of which two were eventually built. (One of these, St. John's Methodist Church, is still standing.) The mill was furnished with the most recent technology for spinning and weaving, and went into operation in 1849. The financial success of the enterprise prompted the development of other, similar mills elsewhere in the South. Development was interrupted by the American Civil War, although this facility was one of the mainstays of textile production in the Confederacy. Gregg's businesses continues to operate today, as Graniteville Specialty Fabrics.

Graniteville is located west of Aiken, on the east side of Horse Creek, a tributary of the Savannah River to the southwest. The historic district includes the original 1846 power canal (no longer used for that purpose), which runs north from the center of Graniteville on the west side of Canal Street (South Carolina Highway 191). It also includes the original 1849 mill building, the 1847 Graniteville Academy building, St. John's Methodist Church, and the surviving line of 1840s worker houses on Gregg Street.

== See also ==
- List of National Historic Landmarks in South Carolina
- National Register of Historic Places listings in Aiken County, South Carolina
