= Mead Hall Episcopal School =

Location
- 129 Pendleton Street, SW / 619 Barnwell Avenue, NW; Aiken, South Carolina 29801; United States; 33°33′52″N 81°43′39″W

Information
- Type: Independent Episcopal
- CEEB code: 410021
- Head of school: The Rev. Dr. Frank Sawyer
- Grades: 3K–12
- Enrollment: Over 300
- Campus type: Suburban
- Colors: Navy and red
- Athletics conference: South Carolina Independent School Association
- Mascot: Panthers
- Website: www.meadhallschool.org

Mead Hall Episcopal School is a private, 3K–12 coeducational college preparatory school located over two campuses in Aiken, South Carolina. Previously covering grades 3K–8, the school expanded to cover high school grades when they acquired Aiken Preparatory School during the summer of 2012. It is the parochial day school of St. Thaddeus Episcopal Church.

== History ==
=== Aiken Prep ===
Aiken Prep was founded in 1916 by Louise Hitchcock, wife of American polo pioneer Thomas Hitchcock and mother of international polo star Tommy Hitchcock, Jr. For most of its existence, Aiken Prep was a junior boys' boarding school for grades 4–9. In 1989, through a merger with the Aiken Day School, the school transitioned to move toward a day school format. During the summer of 2012, Aiken Preparatory School merged with Mead Hall Episcopal School. While the campus will be referred to as the 'Aiken Prep' campus, Aiken Preparatory School is now officially known as Mead Hall Episcopal School.

In May 2012, Aiken Preparatory School's board of trustees voted to sell the school's facilities to Mead Hall Episcopal Day School.

== Academics ==
Mead Hall was one of two schools in Aiken Country to have achieved the College Board's Advanced Placement program Honor Roll with platinum distinction in 2024.

== Athletics ==
=== Golf Program ===
The Mead Hall golf team was the 2023 and 2024 SCISA Class AA state champions.
