= Warren Mill =

- U.S. National Register of Historic Places
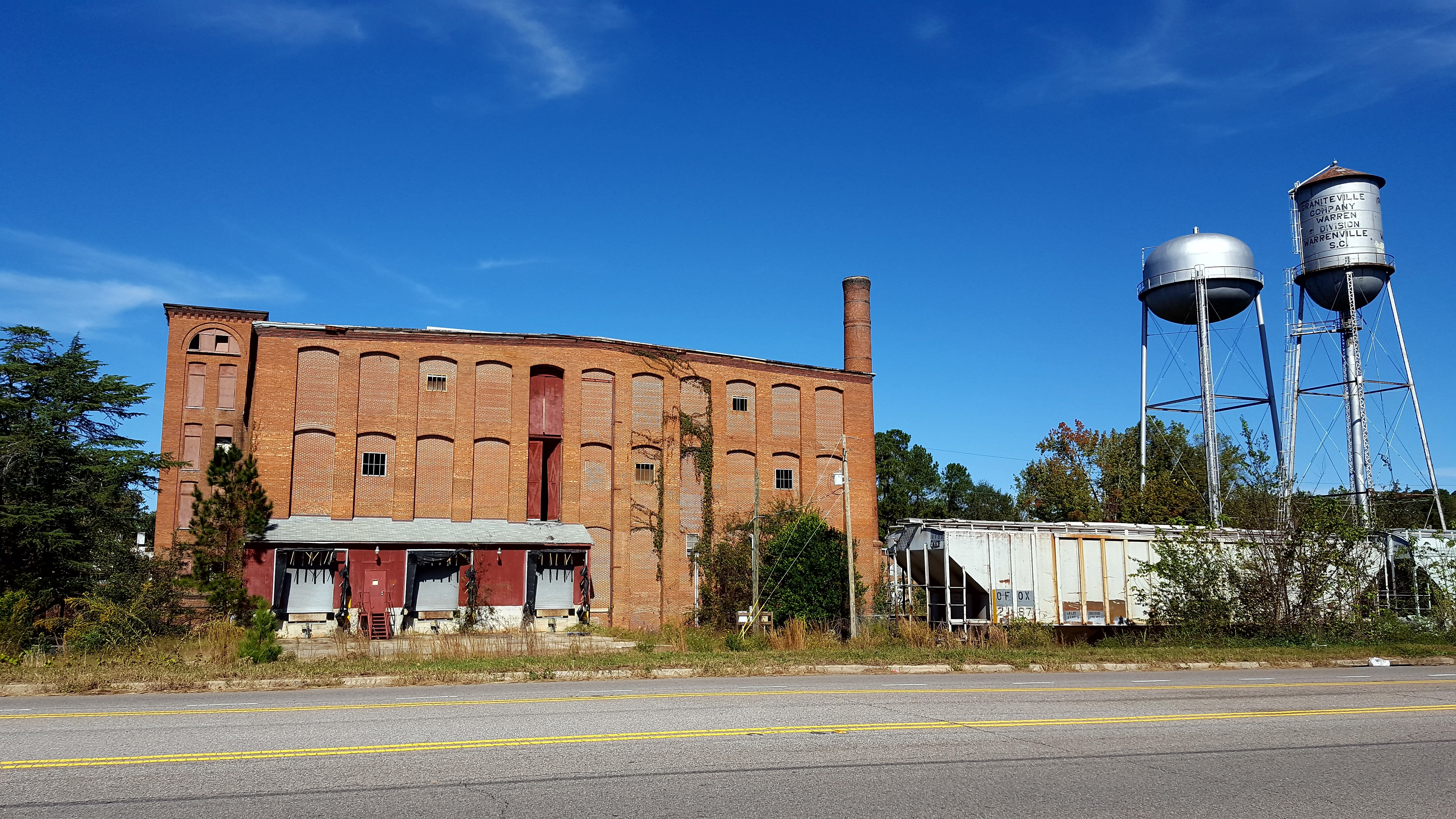

- Location within South Carolina Location within the United States
- Location: Cty. Rd. P-1201 & SC 421, Warrenville, South Carolina
- Coordinates: 33°33′7″N 81°48′31″W
- Area: 7.33 acres (2.97 ha)
- Built: 1896; 130 years ago
- Architect: William B. Smith Whaley
- NRHP reference No.: 16000678
- Added to NRHP: September 27, 2016

The Warren Mill is a historic textile mill complex at South Carolina Highway 421 and Trestle Pass (County Road P-1201) in Warrenville, South Carolina. It consists of a main four-story brick building, to which a number of one and two-story additions have been made. It was built in 1896-98 to a design by William B. Smith Whaley, a regionally prominent architect of industrial properties. The Warren Manufacturing Company was incorporated in 1896, and operated on the premises until 1919, when it was acquired by the Graniteville Mill Company. It operated the plant until its closure in 1982.

The district was listed on the National Register of Historic Places in 2016. In September 2023, construction began to convert the mill into an apartment community, repurposing the existing structure and also retaining the two steel water towers and the brick chimney.

== See also ==
- National Register of Historic Places listings in Aiken County, South Carolina
