= Pickens House =

Historic house in South Carolina, United States

- U.S. National Register of Historic Places
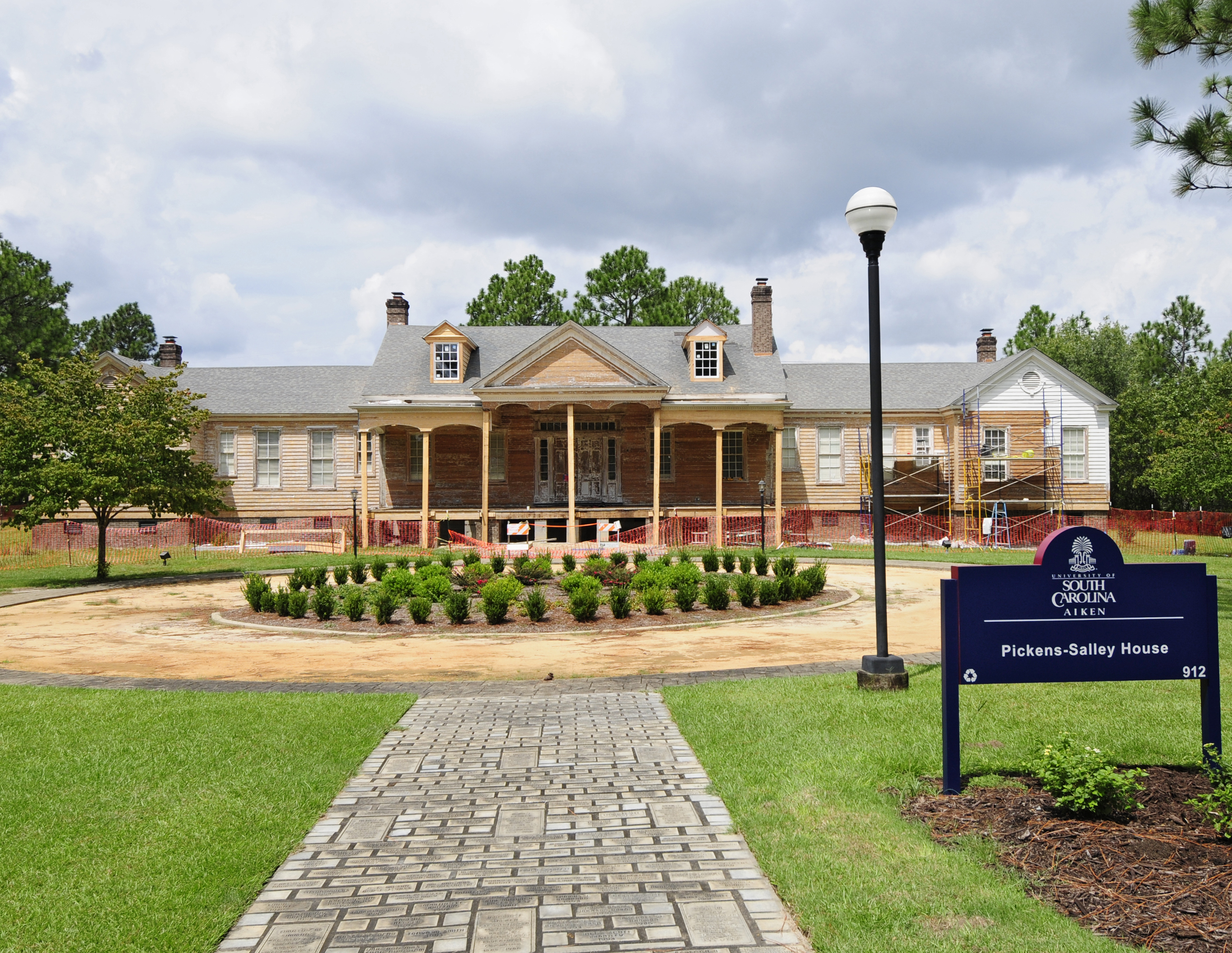

- Location within South Carolina Location within the United States
- Location: 101 Gregg Ave., Aiken, South Carolina
- Coordinates: 33°33′55″N 81°45′39″W
- Area: 13 acres (5.3 ha)
- Built: c.1829; 197 years ago
- Architect: Hair, Byron; Irvin, Willis
- NRHP reference No.: 83002182
- Added to NRHP: May 19, 1983

The Pickens House, located in Aiken, South Carolina. It is reputed to have been built around 1829 by Governor Andrew Pickens for his son. In addition, the home is also noted for its early 19th century backcountry plantation architecture. Eventually the house was abandoned, and in 1929 it was moved from its original address near Edgefield to Aiken by a leading Aiken businesswoman and strong proponent of women's rights, Eulalie Chafee Salley. Around 1990 the home was again moved, this time to the campus of the University of South Carolina Aiken. Much renovation work was taking place in the summer of 2012. The Pickens House was listed on the National Register of Historic Places on May 19, 1983.
