= Pat Sawilowsky =

Patricia Audrey "Pat" Sawilowsky (née Ram) (December 29, 1930 – September 29, 2014) was a past president of the National Ladies Auxiliary of the Jewish War Veterans of the United States of America, and held offices in many other service and charitable organizations. She was also the subject of a chapter titled, "Special People and Places" in Riddick's history of Aiken, South Carolina. She was the mother of Norma Cahen, a past president of the Early Childhood Educators of Reform Judaism and Shlomo Sawilowsky.

== Jaycees ==
Jaycees (United States Junior Chamber) is a non-profit corporation established in 1920 to develop leadership skills via service to the public. The Jaycees fundraising efforts supports many charitable organizations, and they have built hospitals, parks, and playgrounds. Sawilowsky served as the president of the Aiken, South Carolina chapter of the Jaycee's Women's auxiliary (JCetts)(her husband, Jacob Jack Sawilowsky, 1930 - 1980, served as president of the Aiken Jaycees as well), and as the president of the state of South Carolina JCetts in 1964.

== International Toastmistress ==
Toastmistress (an independent organization not affiliated with Toastmasters International) is a world-wide nonprofit educational organization whose mission is to train people in leadership roles. It was reincorporated under the name of International Training in Communication (ITC) or POWERtalk International. Sawilowsky joined the St. Petersburg, Florida club in 1969. She served as president of the local chapter; president of the 1st Council area; president of the Sunshine Region including the states of Florida, Georgia, Tennessee, Mississippi, South Carolina, and the Bahamas (1978-1979); and international convention chair (1988).

During her membership, she won the Toastmistress Club of St. Petersburg, Florida Speech Contest multiple times (1969, 1971, 1973), and placed 2nd place in the regional Speech Contest.

== American Business Women's Association ==
Sawilowsky was named Woman of the Year (1977) by the St. Petersburg, Florida Chapter of the American Business Women's Association, an organization incorporated in 1949 of businesswomen from diverse occupations that provides opportunities for professional growth through leadership and education.

== Jewish War Veterans Women's Auxiliary ==
Sawilowsky was awarded medals by the Jewish War Veterans Auxiliary Florida Chapter from 1993 - 1997 for her leadership in various initiatives, including

- Child Welfare
- Mental Health
- Americanism
- Hospital

She was honored as the Florida Chapter Woman of Valor in 2002. She served as President of the Broward/Palm Beach County Ladies Auxiliary of Jewish War Veterans in 2002-2003.

== Plantation Unit of Parliamentarians ==
Sawilowsky was a board member of the Plantation (Broward County) chapter of the non-profit National Association of Parliamentarians. The NAP began in 1930 and has a membership of over 3,500 parliamentarians.

== March of Dimes and American Heart Association ==
Sawilowsky served as executive director of the National Foundation of March of Dimes St. Petersburg, Florida chapter. She was honored in 1981 by Pinellas County Schools for her service to the community. She also served as Executive Director of the American Heart Association in St. Petersburg and Ft. Lauderdale, Florida. She raised millions of dollars for these two charities.

== AARP ==
In retirement, Sawilowsky also served as a District Director of the American Association of Retired Persons (AARP).
