= Coker Spring =

Fresh water spring in Aiken, South Carolina, US

- U.S. National Register of Historic Places
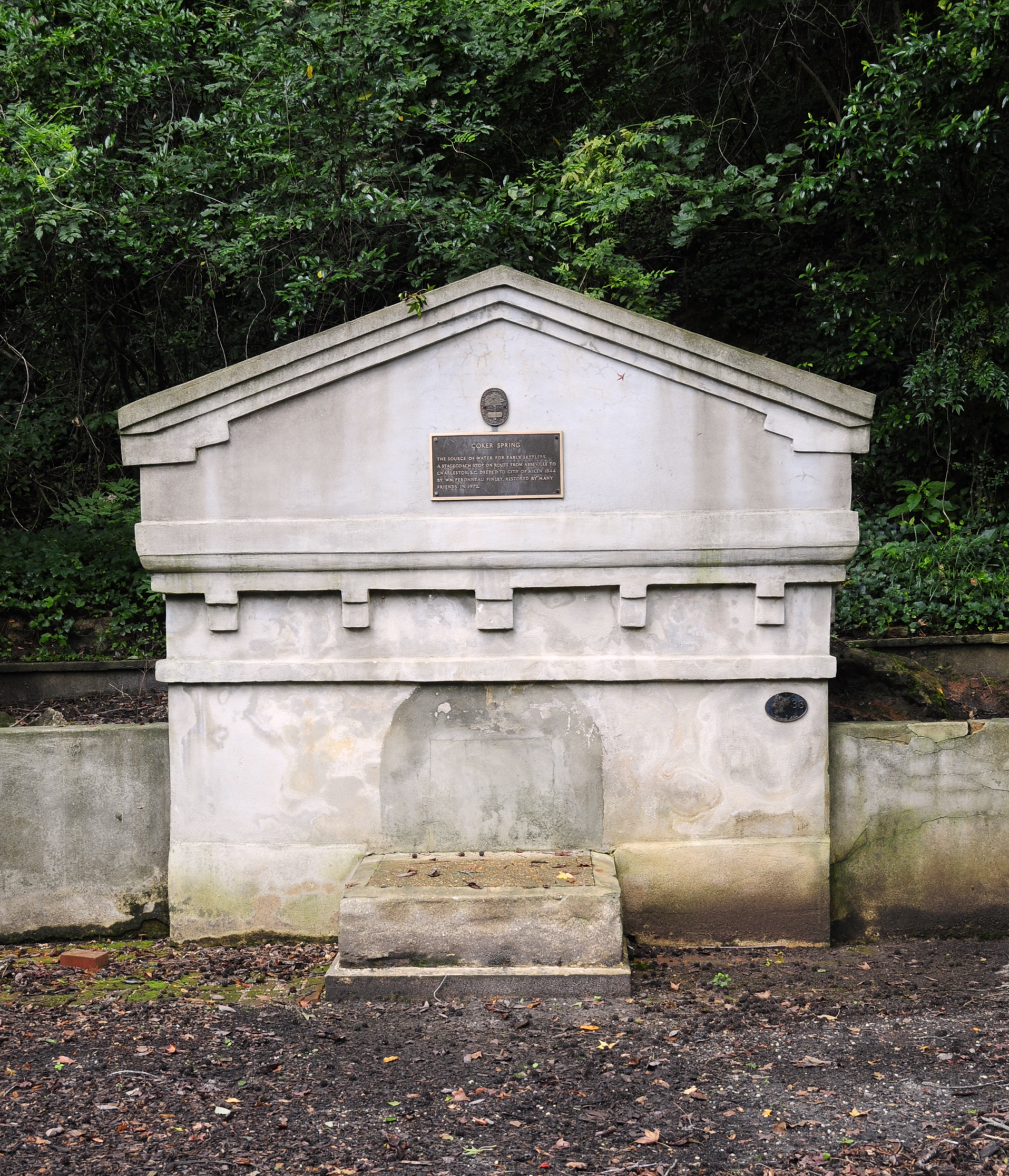

- Location within South Carolina Location within the United States
- Location: Coker Spring Rd., Aiken, South Carolina
- Coordinates: 33°32′59″N 81°43′37″W
- Area: less than one acre
- Built: 1890; 136 years ago
- NRHP reference No.: 78002490
- Added to NRHP: January 18, 1978

Coker Spring is a fresh water spring located on Coker Spring Road in Aiken, South Carolina. This spring is formed by a "junction" where the water table intersects the ground surface and according to archaeological remains, has been used since prehistoric times. Coker Springs was listed in the National Register of Historic Places on January 18, 1978.

== History ==
Dating back to prehistoric times, Coker Springs served as a water source for Native Americans, Aiken's early settlers, and British troops during the Revolutionary War.

This historic site was part of an original land grant to Ephraim Franklin in 1787, but the spring was named for the original owner of the adjacent land. Over the years the land changed hands many times, but the spring gained prominence as a regular stop on the stagecoach route from Abbeville to Charleston.

Eventually William Perroneau Finley (1803-1876) purchased the land in 1842 and deeded it to Aiken in 1844, with the stipulation that the city grant, "free use of said Spring to be had and enjoyed by the citizens and inhabitants of Aiken and the public generally for themselves, their servants, cattle and horses, forever."

Used as a gathering place for servants to do the laundry, it also served as the primary watering source for the Town of Aiken until a central waterworks was established in 1892.

The spring was first covered with a spring house that was constructed in the early 1800s and a "Greek-style brick-and-stucco facade" was added in the 1850s. Throughout the years the springs fell into disrepair, but was completely restored in 1972.
