= Phelps House (Aiken, South Carolina) =

Historic house in South Carolina, United States

- Phelps House or Rose Hill Estate
- U.S. National Register of Historic Places
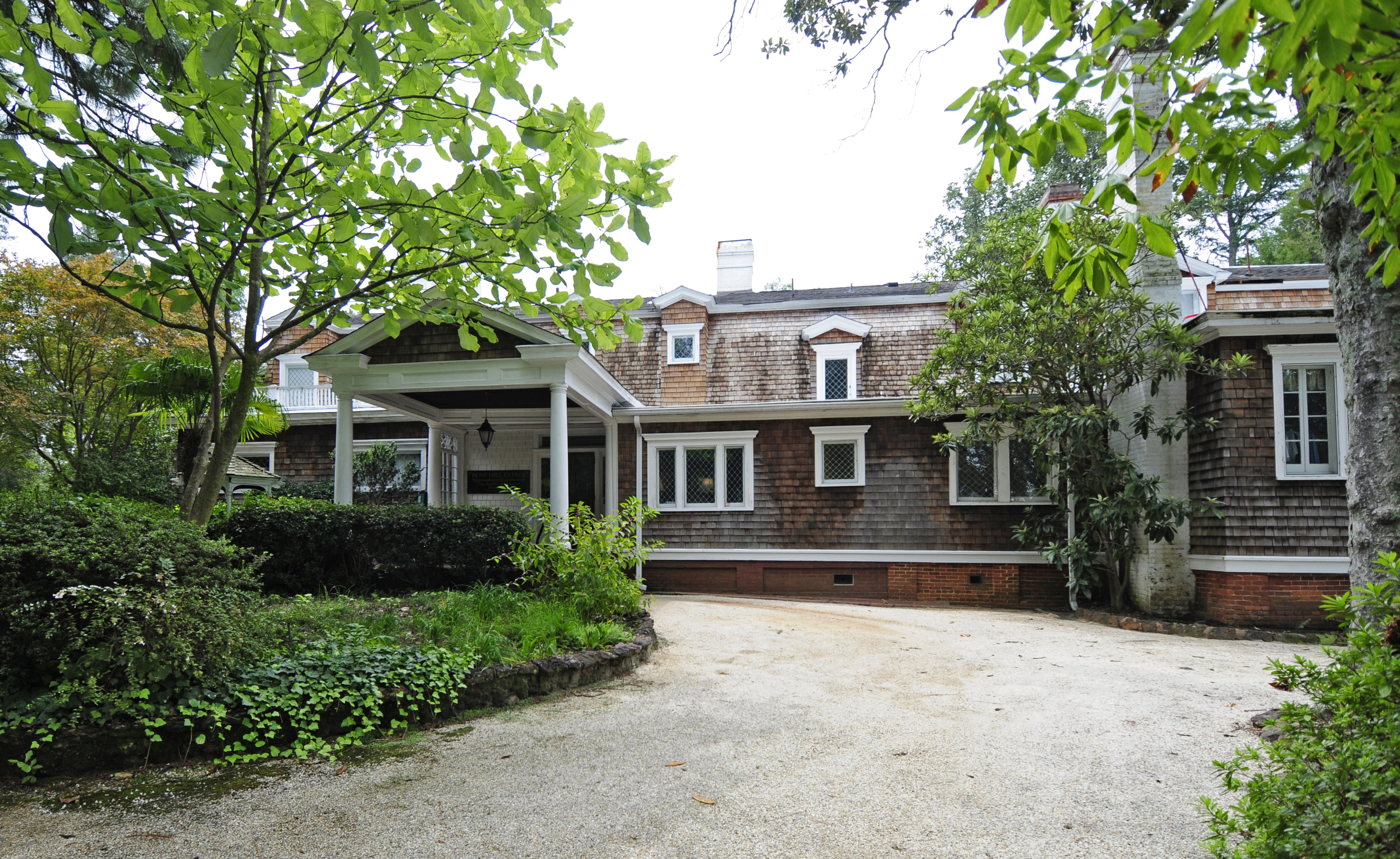

- Location within South Carolina Location within the United States
- Location: Greenville St. & Barnwell Ave., Aiken, South Carolina
- Coordinates: 33°33′56″N 81°43′29″W
- Area: 4.2 acres (1.7 ha)
- Built: 1900; 126 years ago
- Architectural style: Shingle Style
- NRHP reference No.: 74001819
- Added to NRHP: June 10, 1974

The Phelps House (or Rose Hill Estate), is located in Aiken, South Carolina. The house was built in the early 1900s on the foundations of an antebellum house that had been destroyed during the Civil War. It is historically significant for several reasons, one of which is its very distinctive Shingle Style. This style, used often in the late 1800s and early 1900s in the resort homes of the rich, was rarely used in South Carolina. The large house has over 20 rooms, and the grounds include the stables, garage, greenhouses and kennels. As of 2012, the home is available for commercial purposes and due to this use, can be readily viewed and enjoyed. It was listed in the National Register of Historic Places on June 10, 1974.

The property is open to the public with amenities that include Overnight Accommodations, Event Venue Facilities, Catering and The Stables Restaurant.
