= Charles E. Simons Jr. Federal Court House =

- US Court House – Aiken, South Carolina
- U.S. National Register of Historic Places
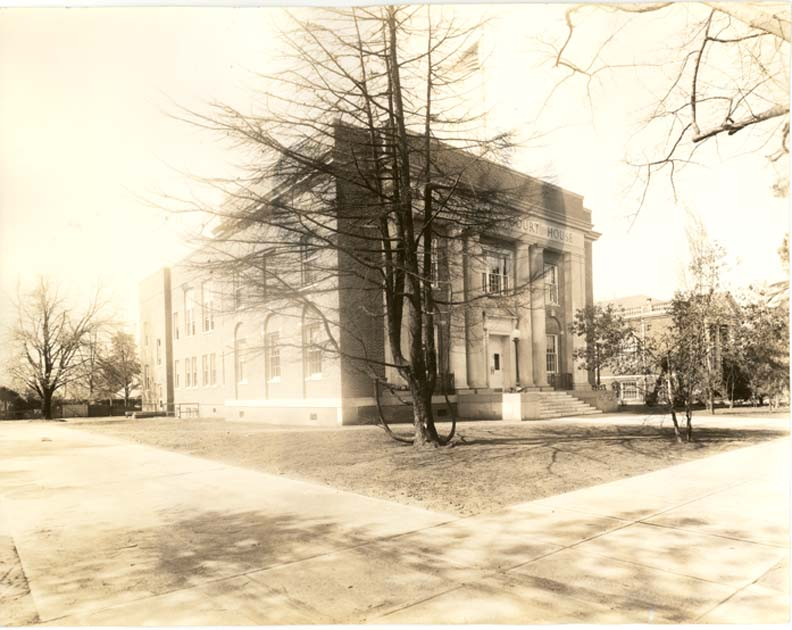
- The Courthouse in 1935

- Location within South Carolina Location within the United States
- Location: 223 Park Ave., SE, Aiken, South Carolina
- Coordinates: 33°33′32″N 81°43′23″W
- Area: less than one acre
- Built: 1935; 91 years ago
- Architectural style: Georgian Revival
- NRHP reference No.: 03001288
- Added to NRHP: December 10, 2003

The Charles E. Simons Jr. Federal Court House is located in Aiken, South Carolina. It is significant for its association with the many federal construction programs of the Great Depression era. The building, designed by Columbia, South Carolina architects Lafaye and Lafaye, is an excellent example of a Georgian Revival building, a style often used during the 1920s and 1930s for government buildings in smaller towns. The Court House was listed in the National Register of Historic Places on December 10, 2003.

The building was named for District Court judge Charles Earl Simons Jr. in 1986.
