= Silver Bluff (Jackson, South Carolina) =

Archaeological site in South Carolina, United States

- U.S. National Register of Historic Places
- Nearest city: Jackson, South Carolina
- Area: 175 acres (71 ha)
- Built: 1785; 241 years ago
- NRHP reference No.: 77001211
- Added to NRHP: November 1, 1977

Silver Bluff in Jackson, South Carolina consists of 175 acres (71 ha) of cultivated fields and wooded area overlooking the Savannah River. It was the site of an Indian trading post in the 1740s. The community disappeared around the turn of the 20th century. Silver Bluff was listed in the National Register of Historic Places on November 1, 1977.
