= Dawson-Vanderhorst House =

Historic house in South Carolina, United States

- U.S. National Register of Historic Places
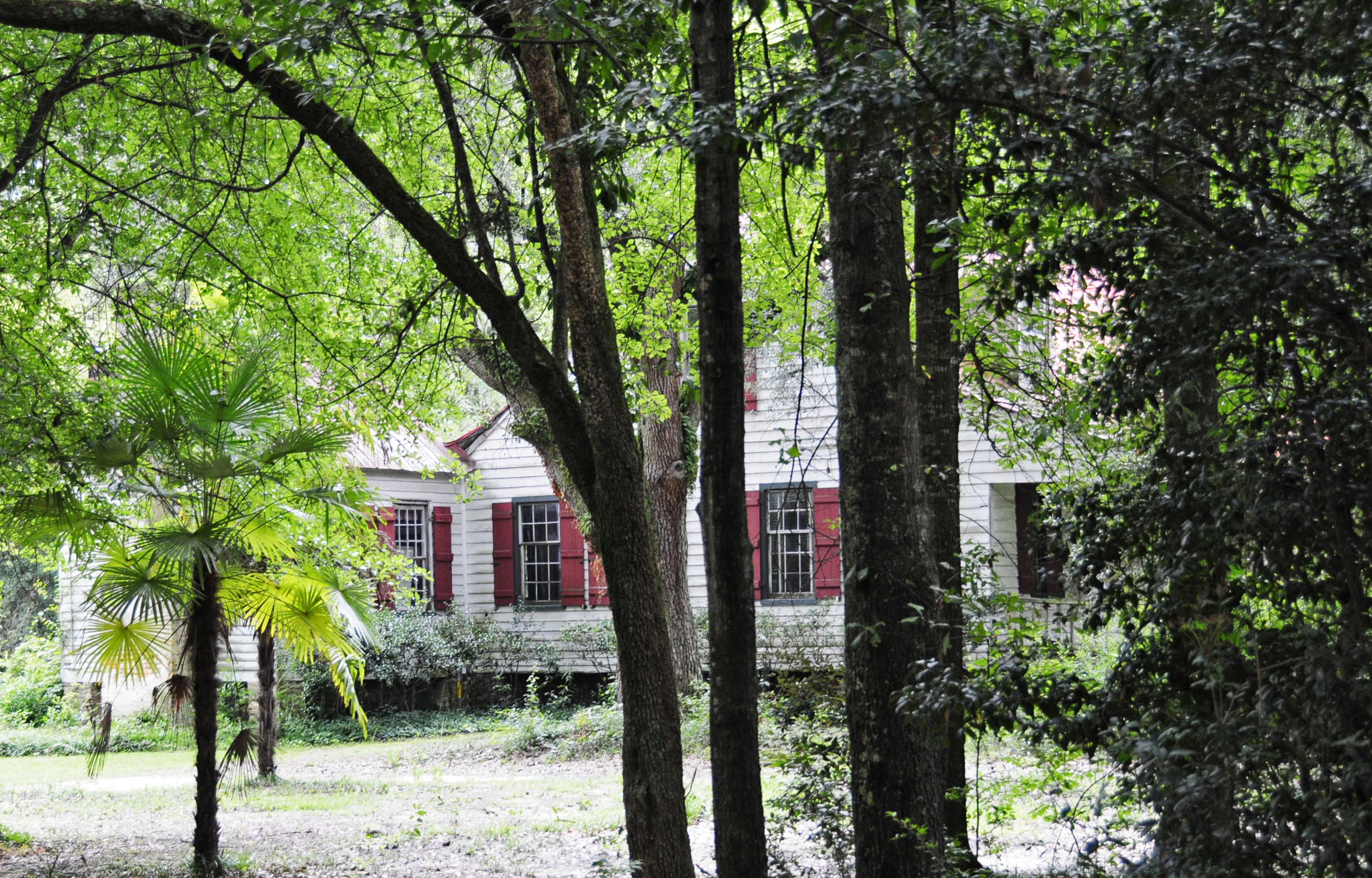

- Location within South Carolina Location within the United States
- Nearest city: Aiken, South Carolina
- Coordinates: 33°34′49″N 81°40′57″W
- Area: 5 acres (2.0 ha)
- Built: c.1785; 241 years ago
- NRHP reference No.: 76001685
- Added to NRHP: June 29, 1976

The Dawson-Vanderhorst House, located in near Aiken, South Carolina in Aiken County. The house is one of the oldest remaining homes in Aiken County. In 1785, Charles Richmond acquired the property by grant. Shortly thereafter it appears that the home was built. There are a number of architectural features to the home that are representative of the time period in which it was built. The rear extensions to the home are not thought to be part of the original construction. The home is on private property surrounded by tall trees and brush. The Dawson-Vanderhorst House was listed on the National Register of Historic Places on June 29, 1976.
