= Aiken Training Track =

Historic horse-racing track in South Carolina, United States

- U.S. National Register of Historic Places
- U.S. Historic district
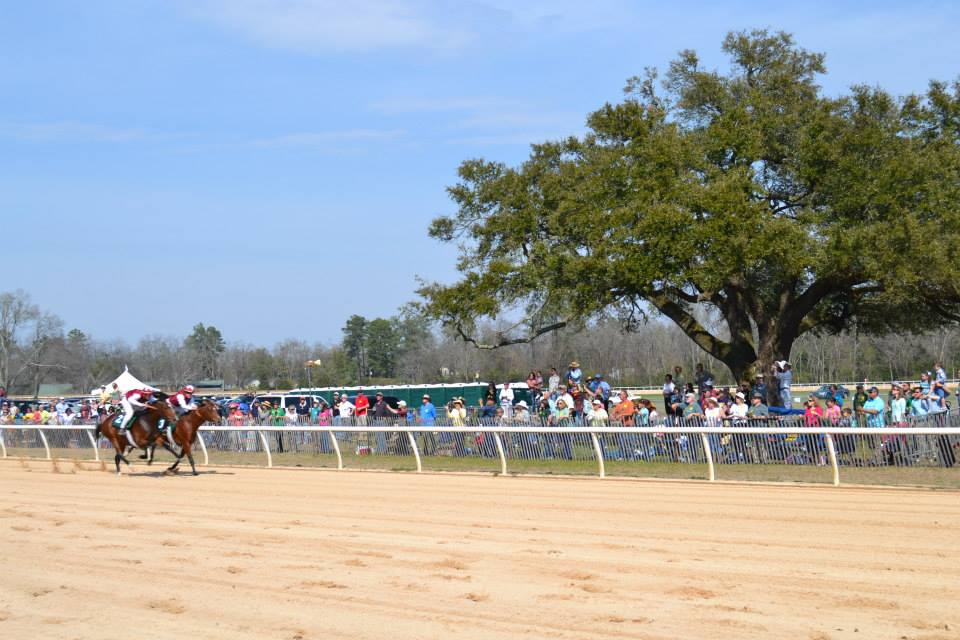
- Aiken Training Track

- Location within South Carolina Location within the United States
- Location: Two Notch Rd., Aiken, South Carolina
- Coordinates: 33°32′35″N 81°42′30″W
- Area: 75 acres (30 ha)
- Built: 1941; 85 years ago
- Architect: Coward, Ira
- MPS: Aiken Winter Colony TR
- NRHP reference No.: 85000992
- Added to NRHP: May 9, 1985

The Aiken Training Track, with its banked turns and soft straightaways, was considered one of the best tracks in the country upon its completion in 1941. Notable surrounding buildings include a stable, shed and grandstand. The track and supporting structures, as well as other (non-historic register) structures may be enjoyed and viewed from the quiet roads that border the large district. The Aiken County Training Track, located in Aiken, South Carolina, was listed in the National Register of Historic Places on May 9, 1985.
