= Jackson, South Carolina =

- Town
- Seal

- Location within South Carolina Location within the United States
- Coordinates: 33°19′42″N 81°47′33″W
- Country: United States
- State: South Carolina
- County: Aiken

Area
  - Total: 3.52 sq mi (9.12 km^{2})
  - Land: 3.52 sq mi (9.12 km^{2})
  - Water: 0 sq mi (0.00 km^{2})
- Elevation: 197 ft (60 m)

Population (2020)
  - Total: 1,521
  - Density: 432.1/sq mi (166.84/km^{2})
- Time zone: UTC-5 (Eastern (EST))
  - Summer (DST): UTC-4 (EDT)
- ZIP code: 29831
- Area codes: 803, 839
- FIPS code: 45-36205
- GNIS feature ID: 2405898
- Website: www.jackson-sc.gov

Jackson is a town in Aiken County, South Carolina, United States. As of the 2020 census, Jackson had a population of 1,521. It is part of the Augusta, Georgia metropolitan area.

== History ==
Silver Bluff was listed on the National Register of Historic Places in 1977.

== Geography ==
Jackson is located in southern Aiken County, 2 miles (3 km) northeast of the Savannah River. It is the closest community northwest of the U.S. Department of Energy Savannah River Site.

According to the United States Census Bureau, the town has a total area of 3.6 square miles (9.2 km^{2}), all land.

== Demographics ==
Historical population
Census	Pop.	Note	%±
1960	1,746		—
1970	1,928		10.4%
1980	1,771		−8.1%
1990	1,681		−5.1%
2000	1,625		−3.3%
2010	1,700		4.6%
2020	1,521		−10.5%
U.S. Decennial Census

=== 2020 census ===
Jackson racial composition
Race	Num.	Perc.
White (non-Hispanic)	1,190	78.24%
Black or African American (non-Hispanic)	192	12.62%
Native American	9	0.59%
Asian	10	0.66%
Other/Mixed	81	5.33%
Hispanic or Latino	39	2.56%

As of the 2020 United States census, there were 1,521 people, 791 households, and 531 families residing in the town.

=== 2000 census ===
As of the census of 2000, there were 1,625 people, 677 households, and 469 families residing in the town. The population density was 457.6 inhabitants per square mile (176.7/km^{2}). There were 788 housing units at an average density of 221.9 per square mile (85.7/km^{2}). The racial makeup of the town was 88.62% White, 8.98% African American, 1.11% Native American, 0.31% Asian, 0.06% Pacific Islander, 0.18% from other races, and 0.74% from two or more races. Hispanic or Latino of any race were 1.23% of the population.

There were 677 households, out of which 28.7% had children under the age of 18 living with them, 55.1% were married couples living together, 10.9% had a female householder with no husband present, and 30.6% were non-families. 28.7% of all households were made up of individuals, and 11.7% had someone living alone who was 65 years of age or older. The average household size was 2.40 and the average family size was 2.93.

In the town, the population was spread out, with 24.6% under the age of 18, 6.9% from 18 to 24, 28.1% from 25 to 44, 22.0% from 45 to 64, and 18.5% who were 65 years of age or older. The median age was 40 years. For every 100 females, there were 94.4 males. For every 100 females age 18 and over, there were 86.3 males.

The median income for a household in the town was $35,924, and the median income for a family was $41,563. Males had a median income of $38,458 versus $24,732 for females. The per capita income for the town was $17,357. About 8.8% of families and 11.1% of the population were below the poverty line, including 21.6% of those under age 18 and 1.9% of those age 65 or over.

== Education ==
It is in the Aiken County Public School District.

Zoned schools are Redcliffe Elementary School, Jackson Middle School, and Silver Bluff High School. Silver Bluff High opened in 1981 as a consolidated high school for Jackson, Beech Island, and New Ellenton.

Jackson has a public library, a branch of the ABBE Regional Library System.
