= Chancellor James P. Carroll House =

Historic house in South Carolina, United States

- U.S. National Register of Historic Places
- Location within South Carolina Location within the United States
- Location: 112 Gregg Ave., Aiken, South Carolina
- Coordinates: 33°33′59″N 81°45′28″W
- Area: 4.5 acres (1.8 ha)
- Built: 1855; 171 years ago
- Architectural style: Georgian
- NRHP reference No.: 77001209
- Added to NRHP: November 23, 1977

The Chancellor James P. Carroll House, located in Aiken, South Carolina, was built in 1855 by James Parsons Carroll, Chancellor of South Carolina. Mr. Carroll was elected to the South Carolina House of Representatives in 1838, later served in the South Carolina Senate, and in 1859, was elected Chancellor of the Court of Equity. Carroll also served as a delegate to the Secession Convention and signed the Ordinance of Secession. The landmark was listed in the National Register of Historic Places November 23, 1977.
