= Aiken Mile Track =

Historic horse-racing track in South Carolina, United States

- U.S. National Register of Historic Places
- U.S. Historic district
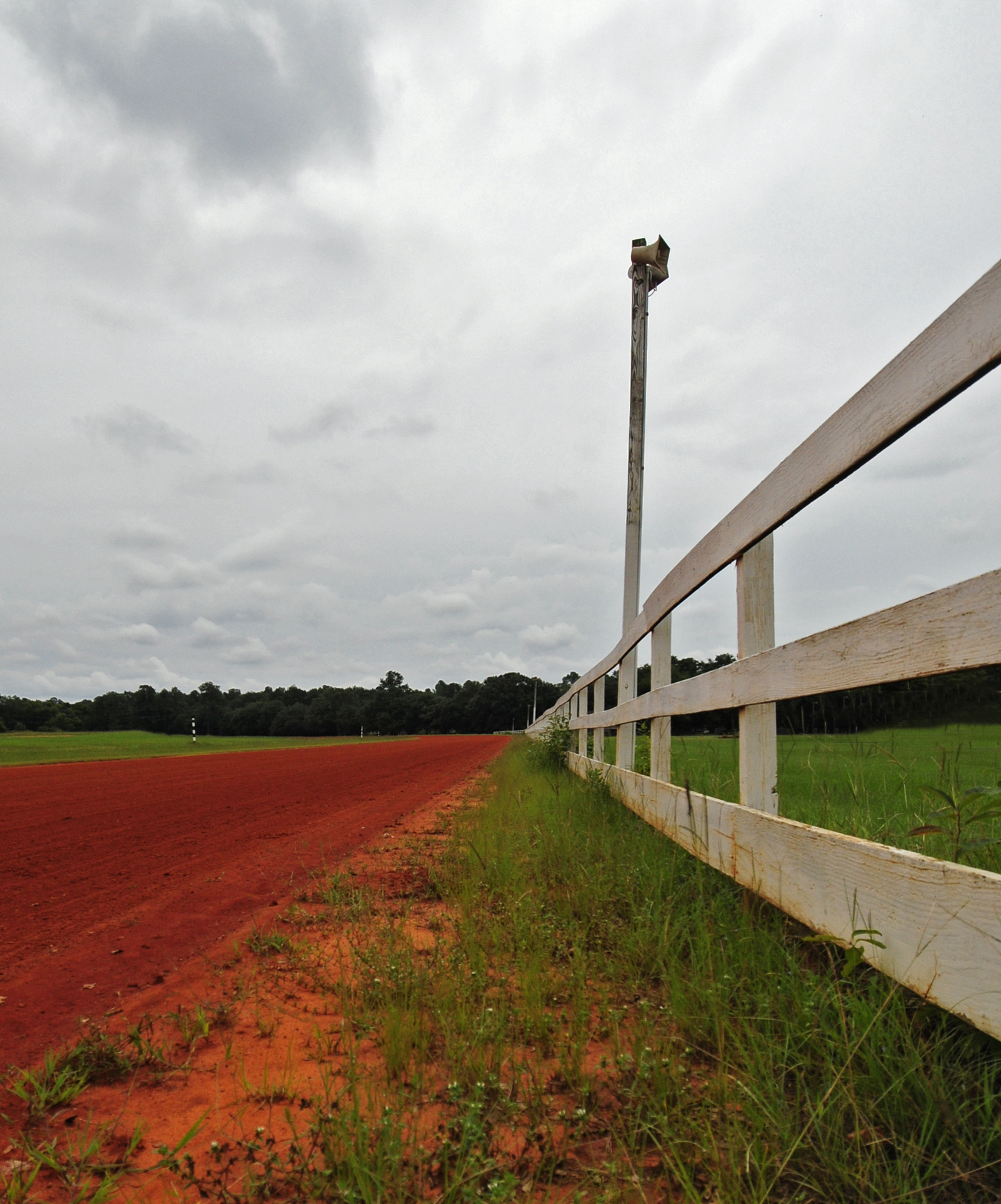
- Aiken Mile Track

- Location within South Carolina Location within the United States
- Location: Banks Mill Rd., Aiken, South Carolina
- Coordinates: 33°32′37″N 81°41′53″W
- Area: 60 acres (24 ha)
- Built: 1936; 90 years ago
- Built by: Ira Coward
- MPS: Aiken Winter Colony TR
- NRHP reference No.: 85000991
- Added to NRHP: May 9, 1985

Aiken Mile Track, located in Aiken, South Carolina, was built around 1936 during the heart of the Great Depression. Horses and horse racing is known as the “sport of kings.” Within that context it is significant that such a track should be built during a time of nationwide double-digit unemployment, and noteworthy in the sense that it contributed to Aiken's success as an equestrian center and “Winter Colony” during those difficult days. The landmark consists of outbuildings as well, including numerous barns. It is an accessible landmark, no more than a few miles from downtown Aiken. Aiken Mile Track was listed in the National Register of Historic Places on May 9, 1985.
