= Legare-Morgan House =

Historic house in South Carolina, United States

- U.S. National Register of Historic Places
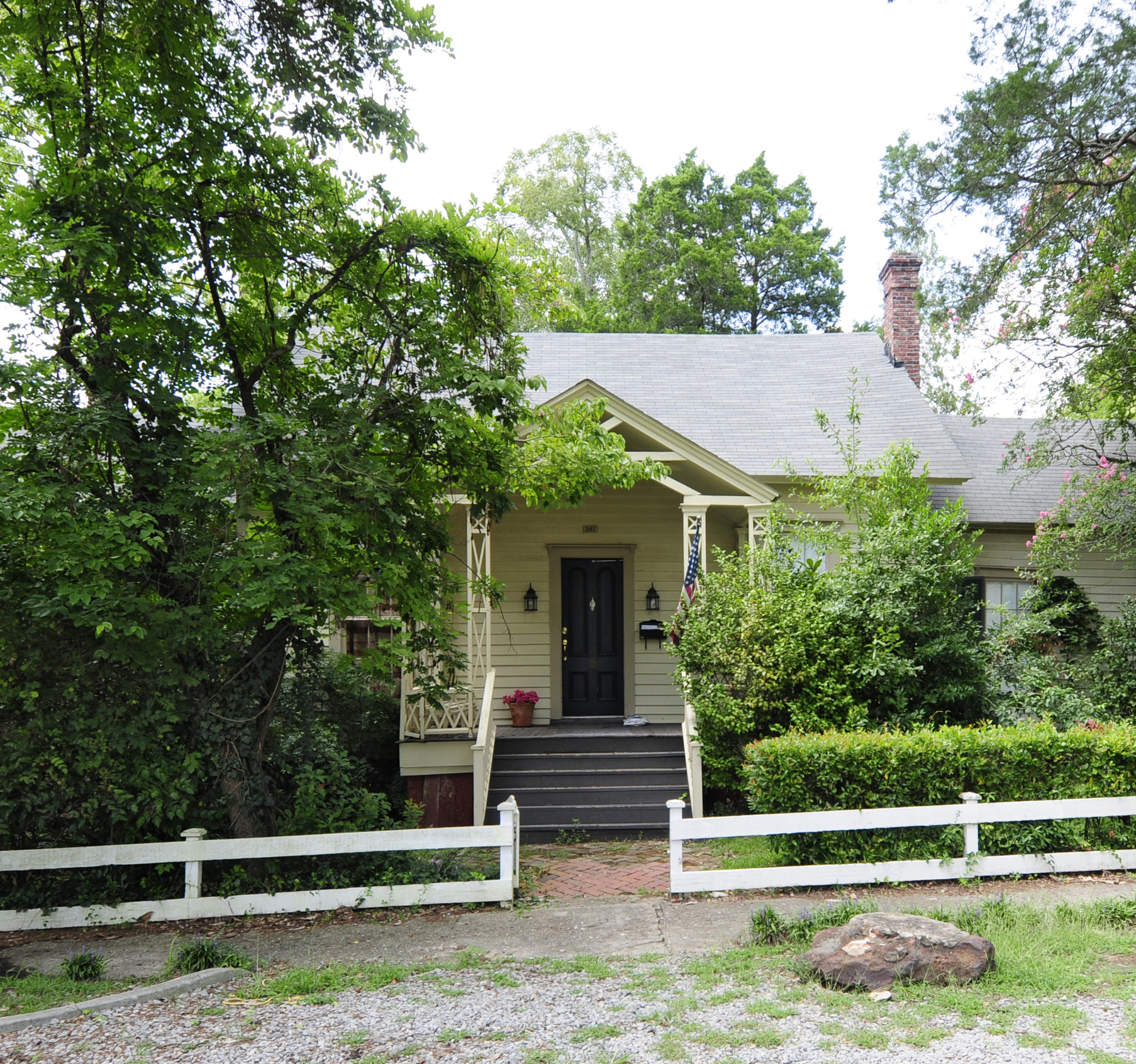

- Location within South Carolina Location within the United States
- Location: 241 Lauren St., SW, Aiken, South Carolina
- Coordinates: 33°33′23″N 81°43′30″W
- Area: 2 acres (0.81 ha)
- Built: 1850; 176 years ago
- NRHP reference No.: 77001210
- Added to NRHP: September 22, 1977

The Legare-Morgan House is a one-story clapboard structure built in Aiken, South Carolina around 1835. From 1850 to 1859 it was the home of the artist, poet and inventor, James Mathews Legare. In 1870 the property was sold to Thomas C. Morgan. The home, located in proximity to Aiken's downtown area, was listed on the National Register of Historic Places September 22, 1977.
