= Whitehall (Aiken County, South Carolina) =

Historic house in South Carolina, United States

- U.S. National Register of Historic Places
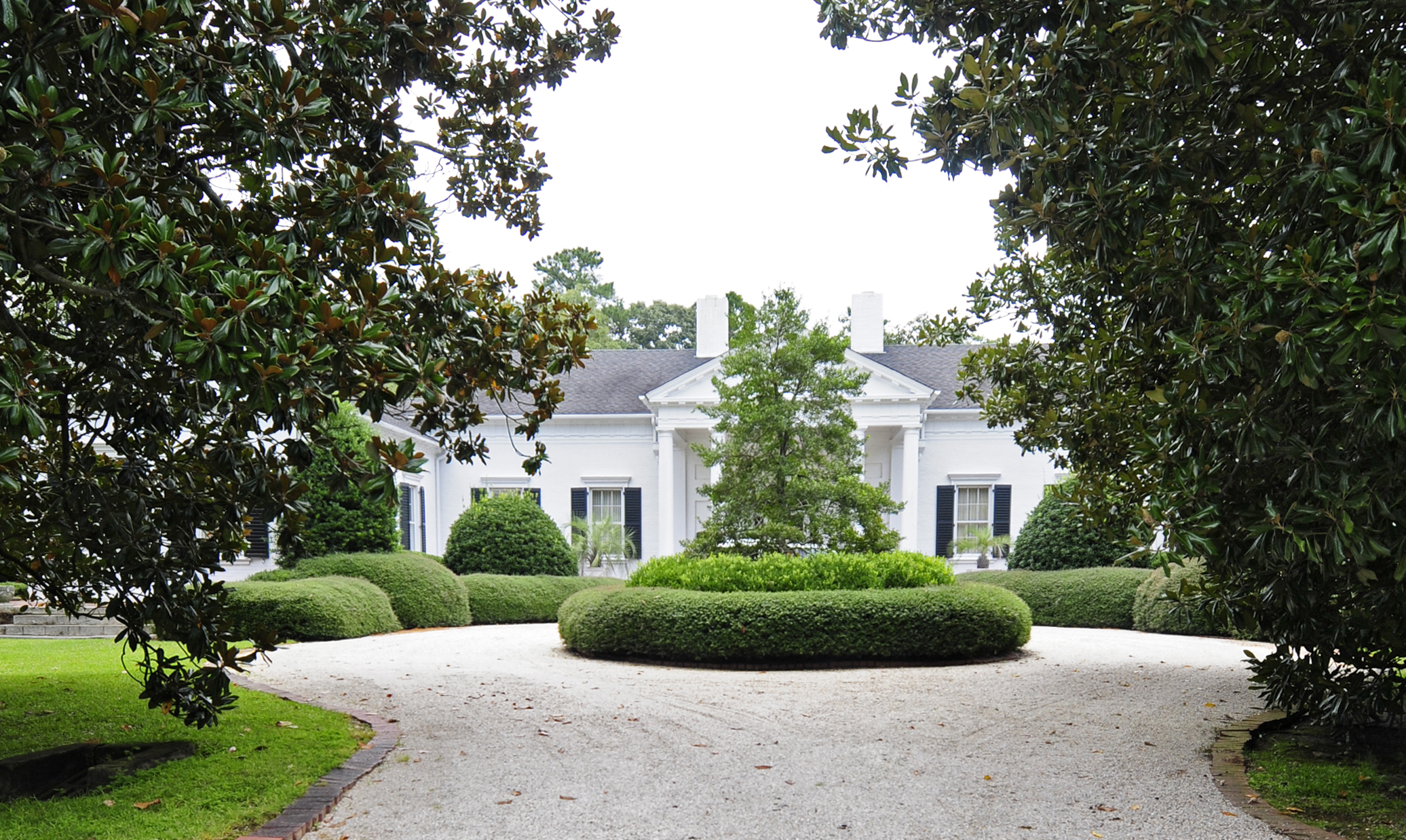

- Location within South Carolina Location within the United States
- Location: 902 Magnolia St., Aiken, South Carolina
- Coordinates: 33°32′31″N 81°43′11″W
- Area: 1.5 acres (0.61 ha)
- Built: 1928; 98 years ago
- Architect: Irvin, Willis
- Architectural style: Georgian Revival
- MPS: Aiken Winter Colony TR
- NRHP reference No.: 84000527
- Added to NRHP: November 27, 1984

Whitehall is a historic home located at Aiken, South Carolina. It was constructed about 1928 for Robert R. McCormick, one of the owners of the Chicago Tribune.

The house was designed by Willis Irvin of Augusta, who won a gold medal for Domestic Work at the 1929 Southern Architectural Exhibition with its design. The one-story, brick, U-shaped house was built on the foundation of an earlier, two-story house that had been destroyed by a fire. It is believed that some of the ornate interior woodwork came from the home of John C. Calhoun’s daughter. Whitehall gets its name from the old Whitehall estate on the ruins of which this house was constructed.

Whitehall is a Georgian Revival residence. Each of the three sections has a gabled roof. The two projecting wings are pedimented and have a boxed cornice with block modillions, round vents and Doric pilasters at the corners. The central section features a pedimented Doric portico sheltering a central entrance with a semicircular fanlight and sidelights. A Doric entablature extends across the central section. Fenestration is regular six over six with dentiled architraves. It was listed on the National Register of Historic Places on November 27, 1984.

The residential area now surrounding this house was once part of the estate of Robert R. McCormick.
