= Immanuel School =

- U.S. National Register of Historic Places
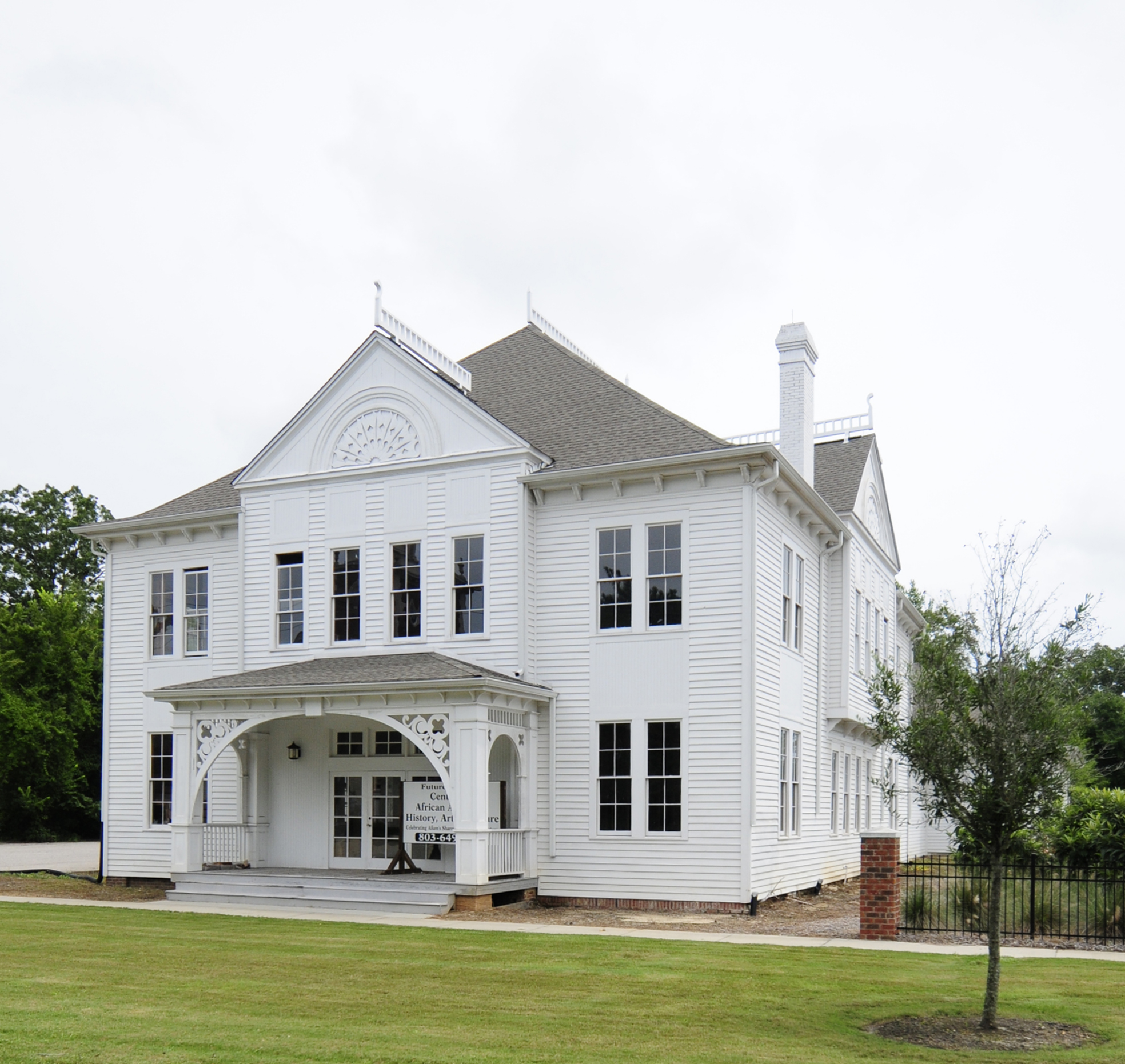

- Location within South Carolina Location within the United States
- Location: 120 York St. NE, Aiken, South Carolina
- Coordinates: 33°33′39″N 81°43′2″W
- Area: less than one acre
- Architectural style: Late Victorian
- NRHP reference No.: 09000389
- Added to NRHP: June 3, 2009

Immanuel School is significant for its association with the area's parochial education of African-American children in the Aiken, South Carolina, (USA), area from 1890 to 1932. It was listed on the National Register of Historic Places in 2009.

== Enrollment ==
Peak enrollment reached 300 in 1906.

== Uses ==
Since 1932, the historic building has been used for many different purposes. It houses the Center for African American History, Art and Culture and is open to the public for events and tours by appointment.
