= St. Mary Help of Christians Church (Aiken, South Carolina) =

Historic church in South Carolina, United States

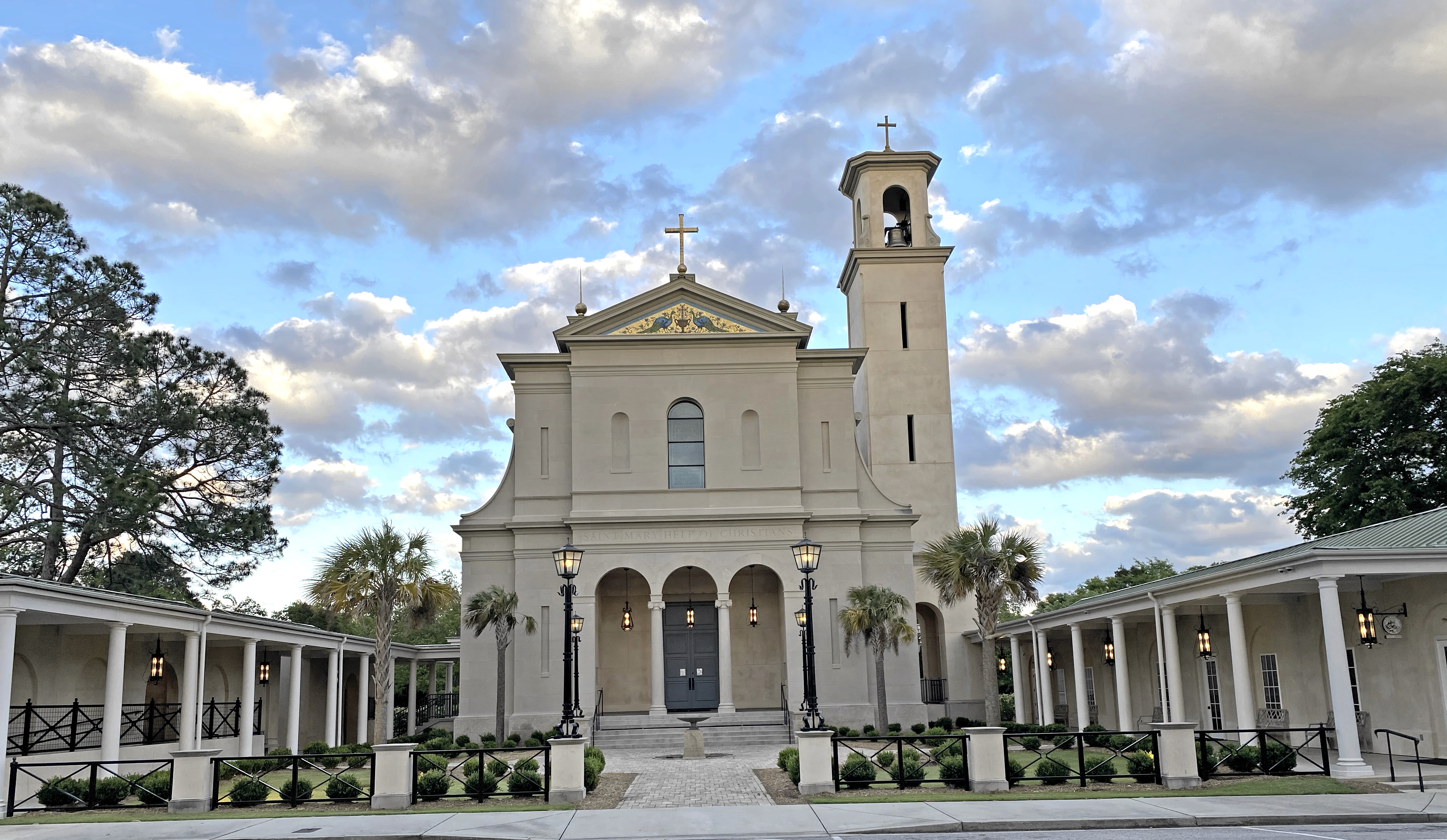
- The facade of St. Mary Help of Christians in Aiken, 2020.

Religion
- Affiliation: Roman Catholic
- Diocese: Diocese of Charleston

Location
- Location: 138 Fairfield St. SE, Aiken, South Carolina
- Interactive map of St. Mary Help of Christians Church
- Coordinates: 33.5578°N 81.7195°W

Architecture
- Architects: McMurphy & Story (1905 church); McCrery Architects (2015 church)
- Style: Gothic Revival (1905) Romanesque (2015)
- Groundbreaking: June 16, 2013; 13 years ago
- Completed: 1880; 146 years ago (Ste. Claire); 1905; 121 years ago (Old St. Mary's); 2015; 11 years ago (St. Mary's)
- Construction cost: $17,000 - Old. St. Mary's $10.2 million - St. Mary's

Specifications
- Capacity: 40 - Ste Claire Chapel; 280 - Old St. Mary's; 950 - St. Mary's
- Spires: 1 - Old St. Mary's; 1 bell tower - St. Mary's
- Spire height: 120 ft (37 m) - Old St. Mary's; 94 ft (29 m) - St. Mary's
- Materials: brick - Old St. Mary's; Indiana limestone / stucco - St. Mary's

U.S. National Register of Historic Places
- Added to NRHP: March 25, 1982
- NRHP Reference no.: 82003827 (Ste Claire Chapel & Old St. Mary's)

Website
- http://www.stmarys-aiken.org

St. Mary Help of Christians Church is a Catholic parish of the Roman Catholic Diocese of Charleston. The main parish church is at 138 Fairfield St. SE in Aiken, South Carolina. The campus also includes the historic 1905 church ("Old Saint Mary's") at the corner of Park Avenue and York Street, and Ste. Claire Chapel (1880), which sits to the left of the historic church. These two church buildings are listed on the National Register of Historic Places.

== Early Days and Founding ==
In February 1840, Count James Achille de Caradeuc, a French army engineer purchased over 400 acres of land about five miles east of Aiken, near the present day community of Montmorenci. Priests from the missions of the area would stay at his estate and celebrate Mass from time to time. Anticipating the growth of the Catholic population in the nearby, still newly established town of Aiken, Bishop Ignatius A. Reynolds purchased a tract of land on the corner of Park Ave. and York St., thereby establishing the parish on June 29, 1853, the Solemnity of Sts. Peter and Paul. The first parish church was constructed on this corner in 1867. This small building was destroyed by a tornado in 1878.

== Ste Claire Chapel (1880) ==
Ste Claire Chapel is a brick Gothic Revival chapel in the Early English Style that was constructed in 1879-1880. A winter resident of Aiken, Celestine E. Eustis aunt of Louise Eustis Hitchcock (wife of Thomas Hitchcock, one of the founding families of the Aiken Winter Colony), helped with funds to build a new church. Local tradition says that it was designed by James Renwick Jr., who designed St. Patrick's Cathedral and the Smithsonian Institution Building. This is plausible because Miss Eustis was the aunt of W.W. Corcoran's grandchildren, and Renwick had designed buildings for Corcoran in Washington, D.C.

The chapel has a steeply pitched gabled, slate roof. It has a rosewood altar. It has three stained glass windows done by Nicolas Lorin in Chartres, France, who had also produced St. Patrick's Founder's Window that had been designed by Renwick.

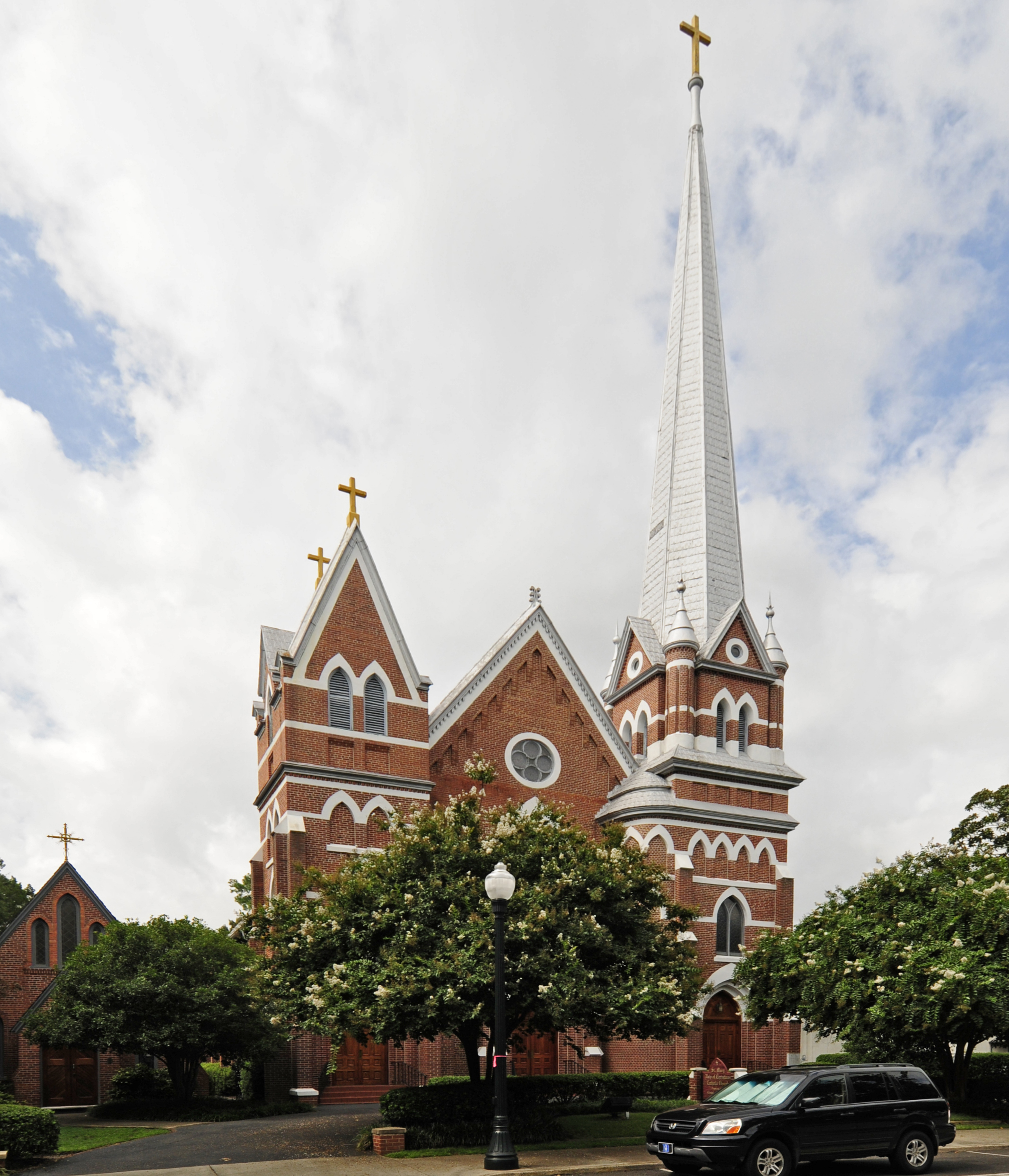
The historic 1905 church and Ste Claire Chapel (left) at the corner of Park Ave. and York St. in Aiken.

== The Historic Church - "Old Saint Mary's" (1905) ==
The 1905 church was built to replace the much smaller Ste Claire Chapel in response to a growing Catholic population. The church seats 280 people and is designed by McMurphy & Story in Augusta in the late Gothic Revival style with elements of the Decorated Gothic style. It has a steeply pitched roof and rectangular nave. The facade has a gabled central section flanked by two towers. One tower has a pitched roof. The other has a 120' tall, white/silver spire with a gold cross. The rectangular nave has a timbered, hammer beam ceiling. In the 1950s stained glass windows were added depicting scenes from the life of the Blessed Virgin Mary.

== St. Mary Help of Christians Church (2015) ==
The newest addition to the parish campus is a romanesque style church that was dedicated on February 2, 2015. This church was constructed to meet the need for a larger church due to a growth in parishioners. This church was designed by McCrery Architects, LLC, and seats 950 people. It bears a facade of Indiana limestone and a 94' bell tower with four bells. Sixteen stained glass windows were added from Franz Meyer & Co., Munich, Germany. The three large windows surmounting the north, south, and west facades are: North - the Blessed Virgin Mary, Help of Christians; South - St. John the Baptist, patron saint of the Diocese of Charleston; and West - Jesus Christ in Majesty. The sixteen lower windows depict the Life of Christ.

== The Tower Bells (2017) ==
The four tower bells were cast in Annecy, France, and acquired through the Christoph-Paccard Bell Foundry. On July 16, 2017, the bells were solemnly blessed by the Rev. Msgr. Richard D. Harris, vicar general of the diocese and native of Aiken. The bells with their inscriptions:

- Saint Anthony of Padua – note D-3 – 3,199lbs: “I will offer sacrifices with shouts of joy, singing and praising the Lord with music.” Psalm 27:6.

- Saint Francis of Assisi – note F#-3 – 1,543lbs: “Bless the Lord, all you works of the Lord, praise and exalt Him above all forever.” Daniel 3:57.

- Saint Therese of Lisieux – note A-3 – 970lbs: “Set me as a seal upon your heart, as a seal upon your arm; for love is strong as death.” Song of Songs 8:6.

- Saint Joseph – note B-3 – 683lbs: “And one seraphim called to another and said: ‘Holy, holy, holy is the Lord of hosts; the whole earth is full of His glory.’” Isaiah 6:3.

== Gustave Doré - Madonna and Child ==
The left side shrine of the 2015 parish church is dedicated to the Blessed Virgin Mary and features a nearly life-size bronze statue of the Madonna and Child by Gustave Doré. This statue, which was cast in the 1880s was donated to St. Mary's parish in 1947 by Beatrice Kinney Lamantagne, another winter resident of Aiken.

== Statue of Saint Joseph, Protector of the Holy Church ==
The right side shrine of the 2015 parish church is dedicated to St. Joseph. The 5' bronze statue was designed and cast by artist Susie Chisholm of Savannah, Georgia. Saint Joseph holds a staff topped with lilies in his left hand and an image of the facade of St. Peter's Basilica in his right.

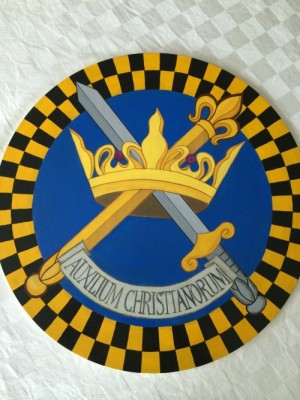
A roundel depicting the title of St. Mary Help of Christians.

== Roundel Paintings ==
These circular paintings within the architectural feature between the arches of the nave and sanctuary called a roundel depict different titles of the Virgin Mary, mostly from the Litany of Loreto. The roundel paintings are original works of art by Alice Marie Judd, a parishioner. Each roundel painting features the Latin name for the title written on a banner underneath the image.
