= Crossways (Aiken, South Carolina) =

Historic house in South Carolina, United States

- U.S. National Register of Historic Places
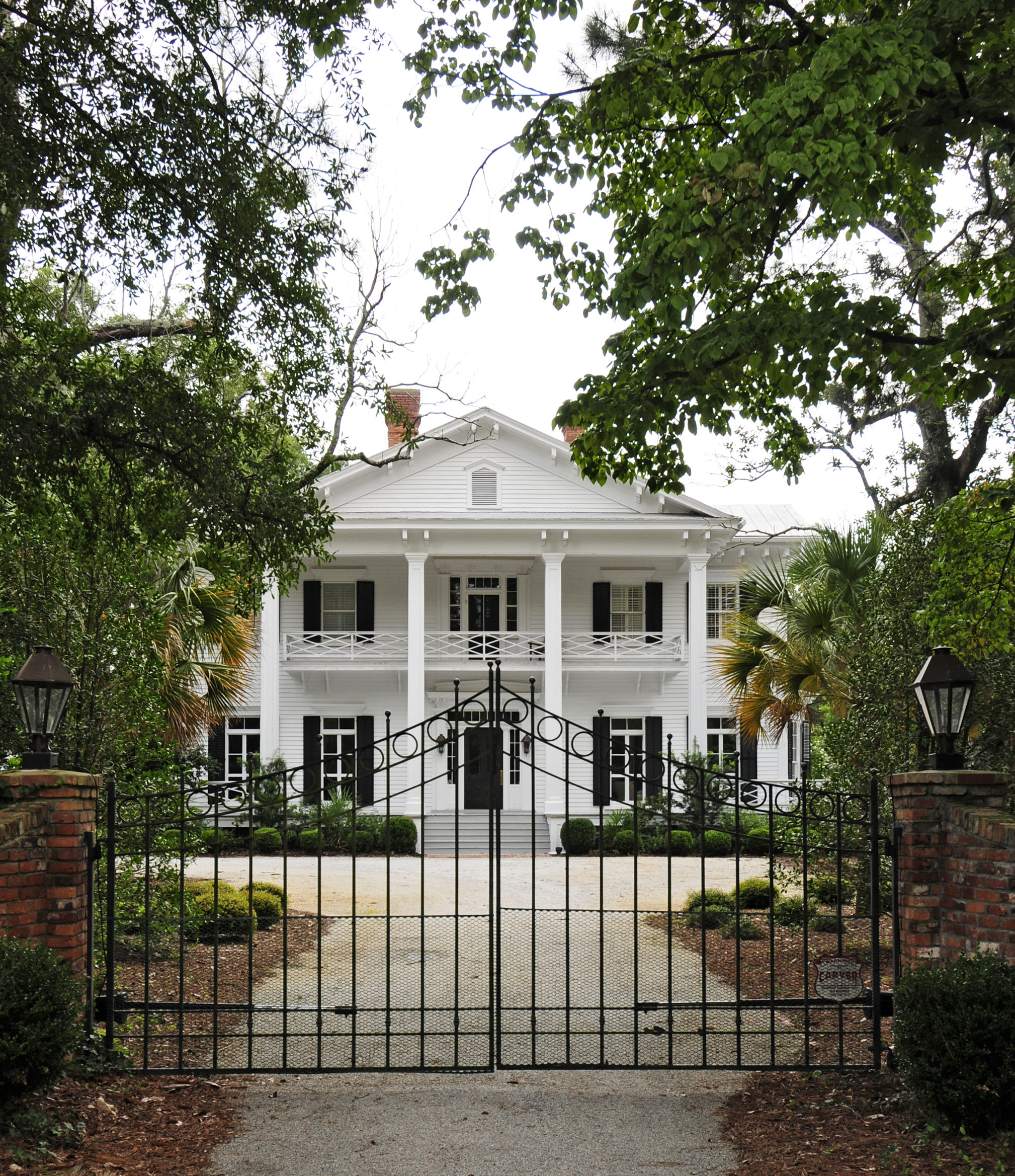

- Location within South Carolina Location within the United States
- Location: 450 E. Boundary St., Aiken, South Carolina
- Coordinates: 33°32′47″N 81°42′06″W
- Area: 2 acres (0.81 ha)
- Built: 1868; 158 years ago
- Architectural style: Late Victorian
- MPS: Aiken Winter Colony TR
- NRHP reference No.: 97000536
- Added to NRHP: June 04, 1997

Crossways, also known as Henry Place, is a Late Victorian building in Aiken, South Carolina. It was built in 1868. It was listed on the National Register of Historic Places in 1997.
