= Chinaberry (Aiken, South Carolina) =

Historic house in South Carolina, United States

- U.S. National Register of Historic Places
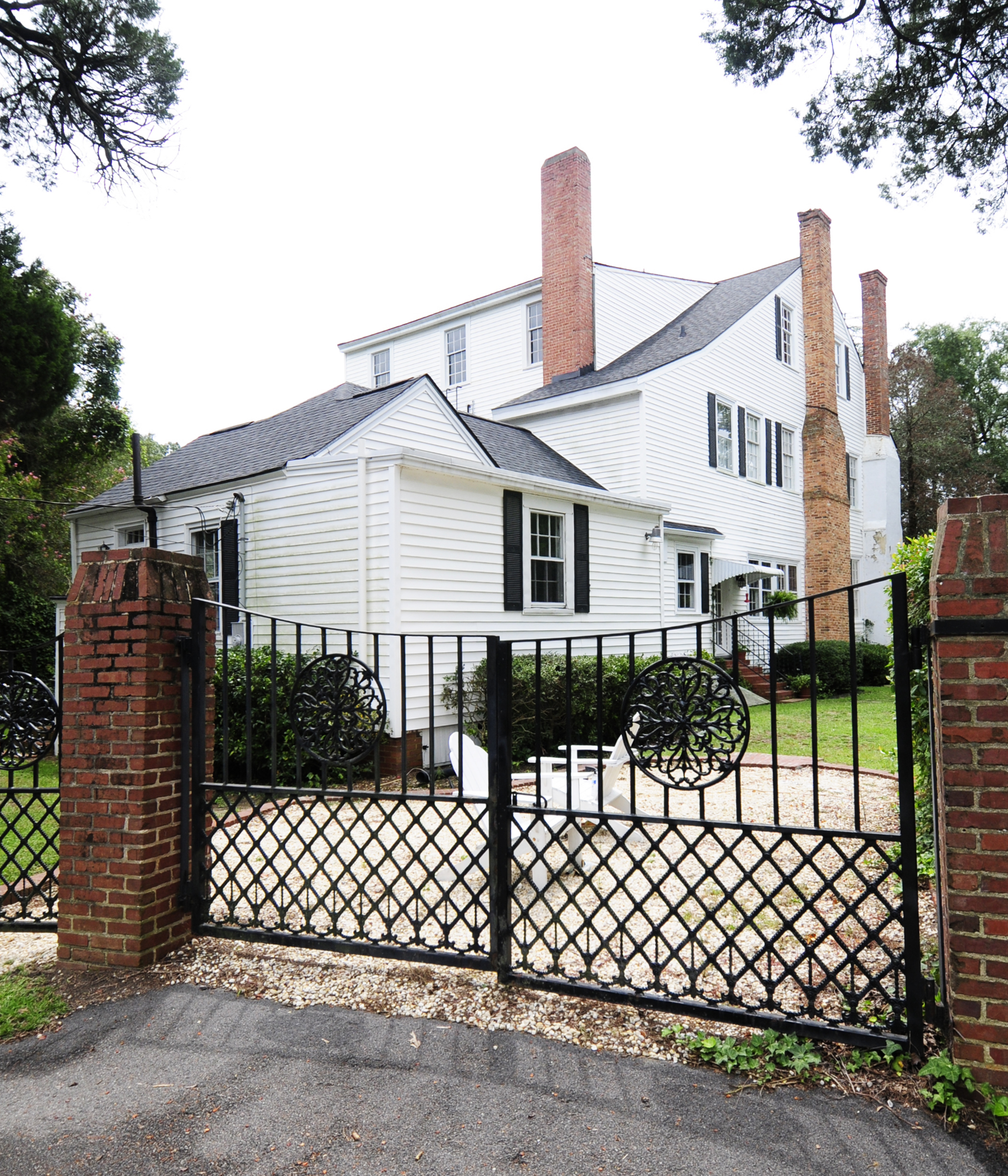

- Location within South Carolina Location within the United States
- Location: 441 York St., SE, Aiken, South Carolina
- Coordinates: 33°33′11″N 81°43′18″W
- Built: 1824; 202 years ago
- Architectural style: Colonial Revival
- NRHP reference No.: 82003826
- Added to NRHP: April 29, 1982

Chinaberry, also known as Williams-Converse House, is a house in Aiken, South Carolina that was built in 1824. It was listed on the National Register of Historic Places in 1982.

A skirmish in the Civil War occurred in the front yard of the property.
