= St. Thaddeus Episcopal Church =

Historic church in South Carolina, United States

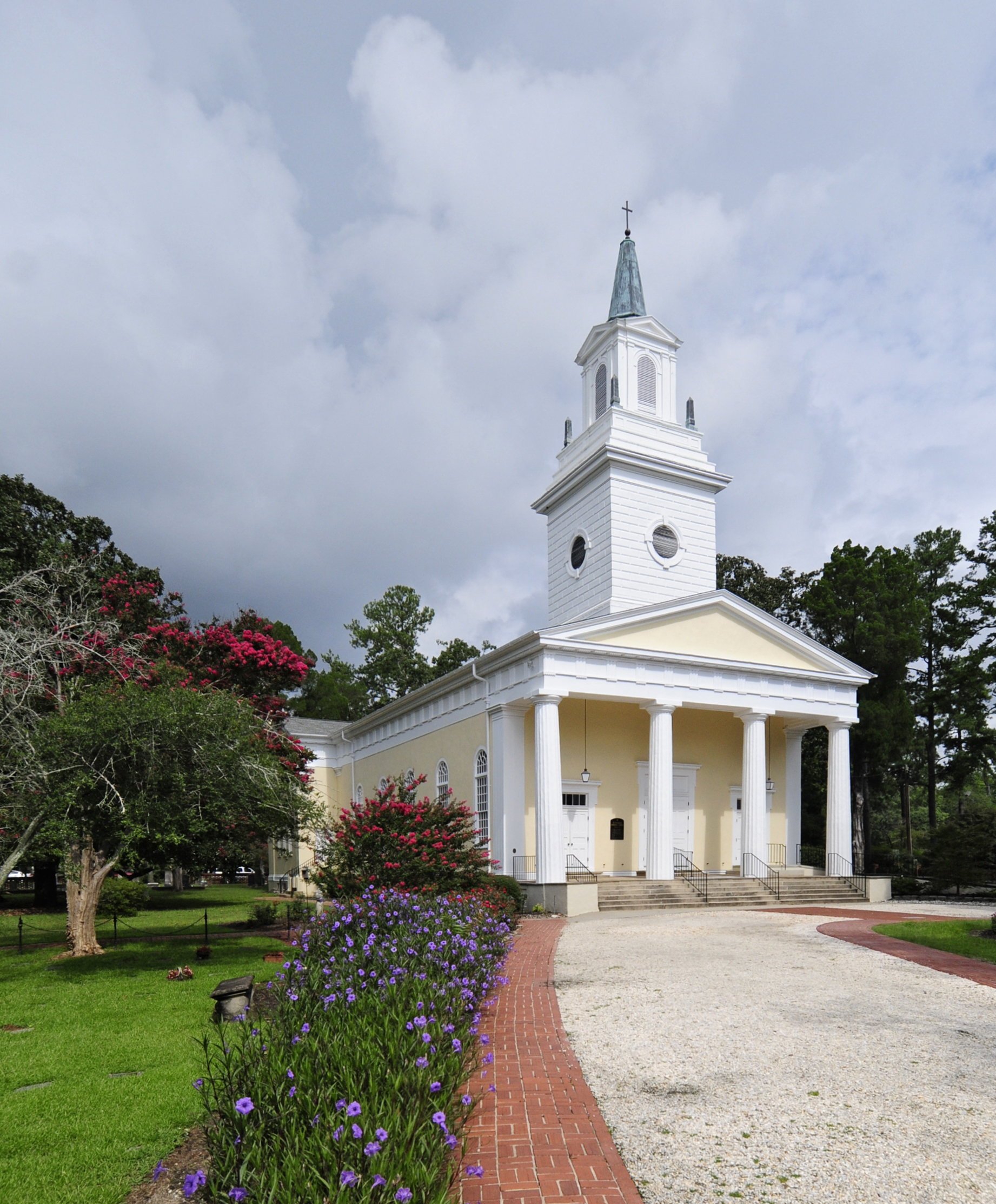
- St. Thaddeus Episcopal Church
- Country: United States
- Denomination: Anglican
- Website: stthaddeus.org

History
- Status: Active
- Founded: 1842; 184 years ago
- Consecrated: August 9, 1843; 183 years ago

Administration
- Province: Province IV
- Diocese: Episcopal Diocese of Upper South Carolina
- Deanery: Gravatt Convocation

Clergy
- Bishop: Rt. Rev. Daniel Richards
- Rector: The Rev. Dr. Marshall A. Jolly
- Priest: The Rev. Joseph Whitehurst

- St. Thaddeus Episcopal Church
- U.S. National Register of Historic Places
- Location: Pendleton and Richland Sts., Aiken, South Carolina
- Area: 2.2 acres (0.89 ha)
- Built: 1842; 184 years ago
- MPS: Aiken Winter Colony TR
- NRHP reference No.: 84000518
- Added to NRHP: November 27, 1984

St. Thaddeus Episcopal Church is a parish of the Episcopal Church (United States) in Aiken, South Carolina, within the Episcopal Diocese of Upper South Carolina. It is noted for being the oldest church structure in Aiken and its historic church building located at Pendleton and Richland Streets.

== History ==
Aiken was planned as a railroad town, and land for the church was set aside in the original layout by the South Carolina Canal and Railroad Company. The cornerstone for the original church was laid on September 5, 1842, and the building was consecrated on August 9, 1843. Over the years, the church underwent multiple renovations and expansions to accommodate a growing congregation. Additional buildings were added to the church campus, reflecting its continued role as a center for Episcopal worship and community service in the region. In 1926, St. Thaddeus underwent a renovation funded by winter colonists. Buildings for St. Thaddeus' parochial school, Mead Hall Episcopal School, were added in 1961. Interestingly, the rector of St. Thaddeus from 1981 to 1984, The Rt. Rev. Robert Shahan, ordained the current Bishop of Upper South Carolina, The Rt. Rev. Daniel Richards.

== Architecture ==
The church retains much of its original 19th-century architectural character, with traditional ecclesiastical design elements. The structure and surrounding property contribute to the historic significance of Aiken’s religious and architectural heritage. It was listed on the National Register of Historic Places on November 27, 1984, as part of the Aiken Winter Colony Thematic Resource area.
