= Aiken, South Carolina =

- City
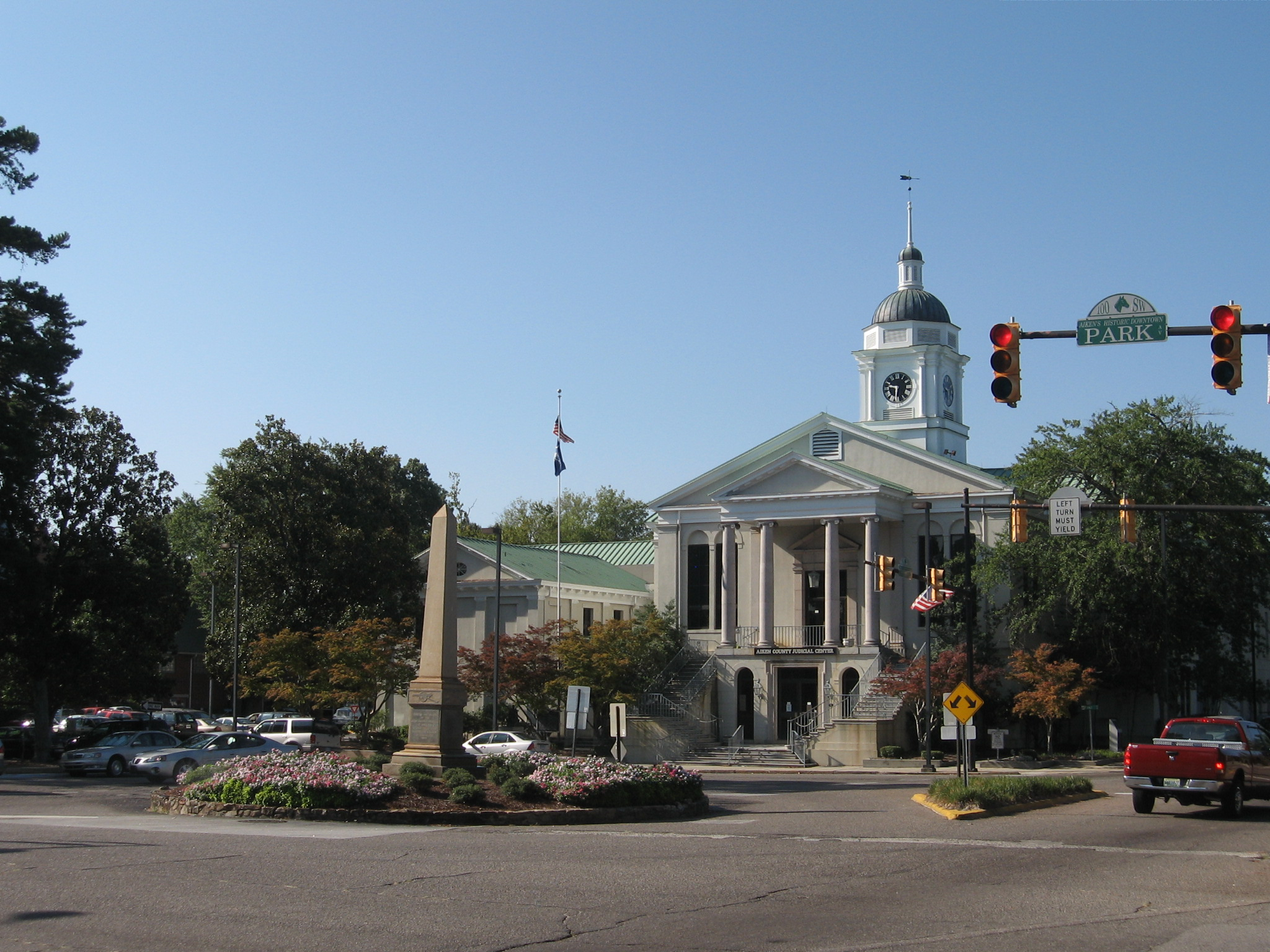
- Aiken County Courthouse

- Seal Logo
- Nickname: The City of Trees
- Interactive map of Aiken, South Carolina
- Location within South Carolina Location within the United States
- Coordinates: 33°30′15″N 81°44′24″W
- Country: United States
- State: South Carolina
- County: Aiken
- Incorporated: December 19, 1835; 190 years ago
- Named for: William Aiken

Government
  - Type: Council–manager
  - Mayor: Teddy Milner
  - City Manager: Stuart Bedenbaugh

Area
  - Total: 21.58 sq mi (55.90 km^{2})
  - Land: 21.45 sq mi (55.56 km^{2})
  - Water: 0.13 sq mi (0.34 km^{2}) 0.60%
- Elevation: 502 ft (153 m)

Population (2020)
  - Total: 32,025
  - Density: 1,492.9/sq mi (576.42/km^{2})
- Time zone: UTC−5 (Eastern (EST))
  - Summer (DST): UTC−4 (EDT)
- ZIP Codes: 29801-29805, 29808
- Area codes: 803, 839
- FIPS code: 45-00550
- GNIS feature ID: 2403067
- Website: www.cityofaikensc.gov

Aiken is the most populous city in and the county seat of Aiken County, South Carolina, United States. According to 2020 census, its population was 32,025, making it the 15th-most-populous city in South Carolina, and one of the two largest cities of the Central Savannah River Area.

Founded in 1835, Aiken was named after William Aiken, the president of the South Carolina Railroad. It became part of Aiken County when the county was formed in 1871. In the late 19th century, Aiken gained fame as a wintering spot for wealthy people from the Northeast. Thomas Hitchcock, Sr. and William C. Whitney established the Aiken Winter Colony. Over the years, Aiken became a winter home for many notable people, including George H. Bostwick, James B. Eustis, Madeleine Astor, William Kissam Vanderbilt, Eugene Grace (president of Bethlehem Steel), Allan Pinkerton, Senator Strom Thurmond, and W. Averell Harriman.

Aiken is home to the University of South Carolina Aiken.

== History ==
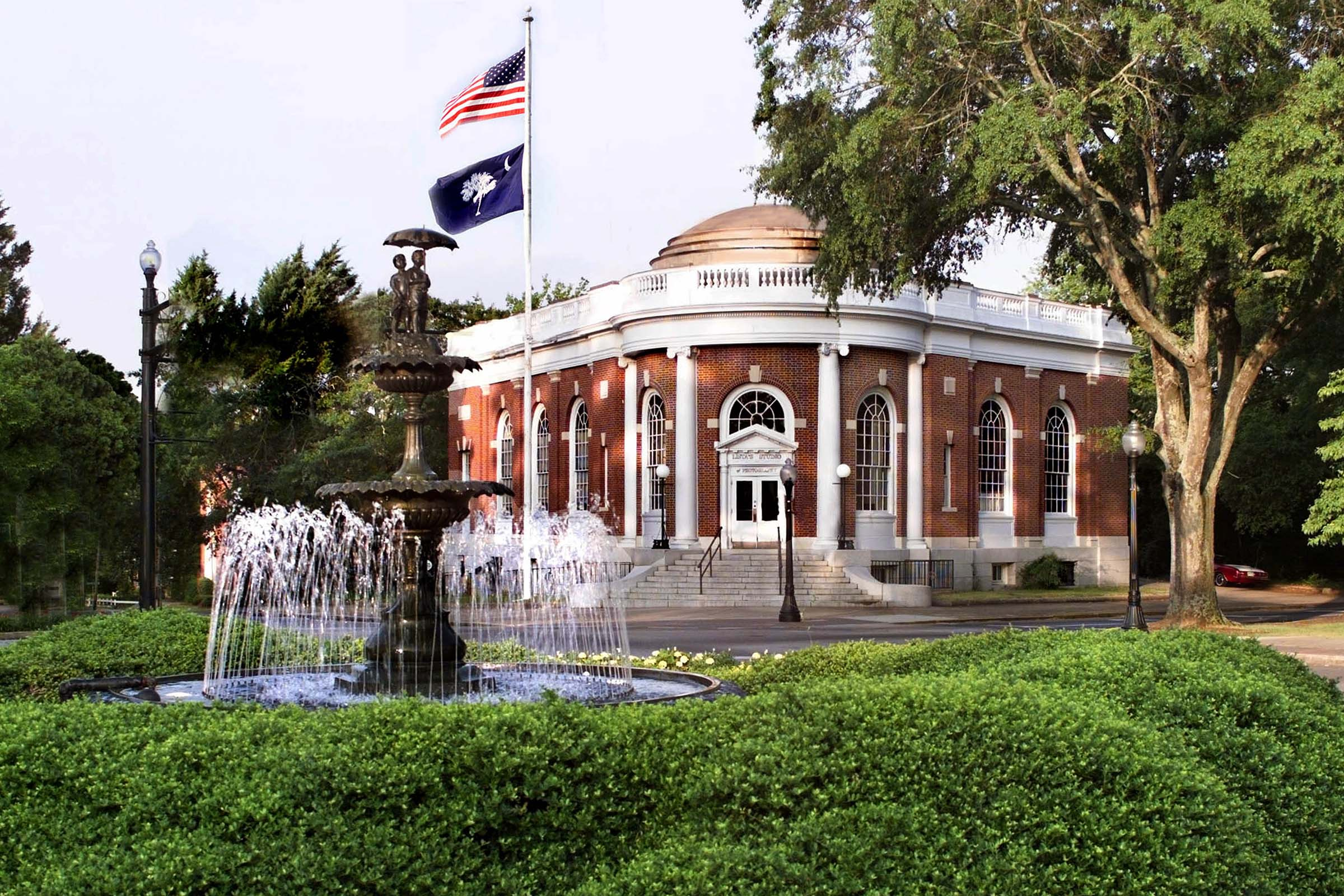
The Old Aiken Post Office in downtown Aiken

The municipality of Aiken was incorporated on December 19, 1835. The community formed around the terminus of the South Carolina Canal and Railroad Company, a rail line from Charleston to the Savannah River, and was named for William Aiken, the railroad's first president.

During Sherman's March to the Sea in the American Civil War Sherman ordered Hugh Judson Kilpatrick and the cavalry corps he commanded to march through South Carolina. By February 5, they had reached Aiken County. While there, Kilpatrick fought Joseph Wheeler and his cavalry corps. This battle, called the Battle of Aiken, was a Confederate victory.

Originally, it was in the Edgefield District. With population increases by 1871, Aiken County was organized, made up from parts of neighboring counties. Among its founding commissioners were three African-American legislators: Prince Rivers; Samuel J. Lee, speaker of the state House and the first black man admitted to the South Carolina Bar; and Charles D. Hayne, a free man of color from one of Charleston's elite families.

Aiken was a planned town, and many of the streets in the historic district are named for other cities and counties in South Carolina, including Abbeville, Barnwell, Beaufort, Chesterfield, Colleton, Columbia, Dillon, Edgefield, Edisto, Fairfield, Florence, Greenville, Hampton, Horry, Jasper, Kershaw, Lancaster, Laurens, Marion, Marlboro, McCormick, Newberry, Orangeburg, Pendleton, Pickens, Richland, Sumter, Union, Williamsburg, and York.

Between 1890 and the 1920s, many Jewish immigrants, many from Eastern Europe, including Russia and Poland (especially Knyszyn), settled in Aiken. In 1905, a group of Russian-Jewish socialists from New York founded a farming colony in Aiken County that was known as "Happyville". Adath (Adas) Yeshurun (Congregation of Israel) Synagogue was chartered in Aiken in 1921, and the cornerstone was laid in 1925. A historical marker was added to the synagogue in 2014, sponsored by the Jewish Historical Society of South Carolina. In 1903, the Jewish-American peddler Abraham Surasky was the victim of an antisemitic murder that occurred near Aiken.

Aiken was the subject of a series of broadcasts by Orson Welles in July and August 1946 regarding the blinding and severe beating of Sergeant Isaac Woodard, a black World War II veteran.

=== Savannah River Plant ===
The United States Atomic Energy Commission's selection of a site near Aiken for a plant to produce fuel for thermonuclear weapons was announced on November 30, 1950. Residences and businesses at Ellenton, South Carolina, were bought for use for the plant site. Residents were moved to New Ellenton, which was constructed about 8 mi (13 km) north, or to neighboring towns.

The site was named the Savannah River Plant and renamed the Savannah River Site in 1989. The facility contains five production reactors, fuel fabrication facilities, a research laboratory, heavy water-production facilities, two fuel-reprocessing facilities, and tritium recovery facilities.

== Geography and climate ==
Aiken is near the center of Aiken County, 20 miles (32 km) northeast of Augusta, Georgia, along U.S. Route 1 and U.S. Route 78. Interstate 20 passes 6 miles (10 km) to the north of the city, with access via South Carolina Highway 19 (exit 18) and US 1 (exit 22).

According to the United States Census Bureau, the city has a total area of 21.58 square miles (55.9 km^{2}), of which 0.13 sq mi (0.34 km^{2}) (0.60%) is covered by water.

Aiken has a humid subtropical climate characterized by hot, humid summers and cool, dry winters, but it experiences milder temperatures throughout the year than the rest of the state. Precipitation is distributed relatively uniformly throughout the year, with mostly rain in the milder months and occasional snow in the winter. The coldest recorded temperature was −4 °F or −20 °C on January 21, 1985, and the hottest 109 °F or 42.8 °C on August 21, 1983.

Climate data for Aiken 5 SE, South Carolina (1981–2010 normals, extremes 1893–present (Note: Records kept at the Aiken 5 SE COOP (33°29′33″N 81°41′45″W) until November 1, 2008, and at the Aiken 2 E COOP (33°33′00″N 81°41′49″W) since January 24, 2009.))
Month	Jan	Feb	Mar	Apr	May	Jun	Jul	Aug	Sep	Oct	Nov	Dec	Year
Record high °F (°C)	82 (28)	88 (31)	93 (34)	99 (37)	106 (41)	108 (42)	108 (42)	109 (43)	106 (41)	99 (37)	88 (31)	85 (29)	109 (43)
Mean daily maximum °F (°C)	57.6 (14.2)	62.0 (16.7)	68.4 (20.2)	77.3 (25.2)	85.5 (29.7)	90.2 (32.3)	93.4 (34.1)	91.6 (33.1)	86.4 (30.2)	77.7 (25.4)	66.8 (19.3)	59.8 (15.4)	76.4 (24.7)
Daily mean °F (°C)	44.8 (7.1)	49.0 (9.4)	54.7 (12.6)	62.9 (17.2)	72.0 (22.2)	78.6 (25.9)	81.9 (27.7)	80.4 (26.9)	75.3 (24.1)	64.9 (18.3)	54.2 (12.3)	48.1 (8.9)	63.9 (17.7)
Mean daily minimum °F (°C)	32.0 (0.0)	35.9 (2.2)	41.0 (5.0)	48.5 (9.2)	58.5 (14.7)	67.0 (19.4)	70.4 (21.3)	69.1 (20.6)	64.2 (17.9)	52.1 (11.2)	41.5 (5.3)	36.4 (2.4)	51.4 (10.8)
Record low °F (°C)	−4 (−20)	6 (−14)	13 (−11)	21 (−6)	34 (1)	42 (6)	51 (11)	52 (11)	37 (3)	25 (−4)	11 (−12)	4 (−16)	−4 (−20)
Average precipitation inches (mm)	4.74 (120)	4.20 (107)	4.86 (123)	3.11 (79)	3.83 (97)	5.46 (139)	5.10 (130)	5.25 (133)	3.80 (97)	3.38 (86)	3.64 (92)	3.78 (96)	51.15 (1,299)
Average snowfall inches (cm)	0.5 (1.3)	0 (0)	0 (0)	0 (0)	0 (0)	0 (0)	0 (0)	0 (0)	0 (0)	0 (0)	0 (0)	0 (0)	0.5 (1.3)
Average precipitation days (≥ 0.01 in)	9.2	8.1	7.9	6.8	6.8	10.1	10.5	10.5	7.2	6.2	6.9	8.6	98.8
Average snowy days (≥ 0.1 in)	0.2	0	0	0	0	0	0	0	0	0	0	0	0.2
Source: NOAA

== Demographics ==
Historical population
Census	Pop.	Note	%±
1880	1,817		—
1890	2,362		30.0%
1900	3,414		44.5%
1910	3,911		14.6%
1920	4,103		4.9%
1930	6,033		47.0%
1940	6,168		2.2%
1950	7,083		14.8%
1960	11,243		58.7%
1970	13,436		19.5%
1980	14,978		11.5%
1990	19,872		32.7%
2000	25,337		27.5%
2010	29,566		16.7%
2020	32,025		8.3%
2025 (est.)	33,808	▲	5.6%
U.S. Decennial Census; 2020

=== 2020 census ===
As of the 2020 census, 32,025 people, 14,028 households, and 8,479 families were residing in the city.

The median age was 47.6 years, with 18.3% of residents under 18 and 29.3% who were 65 or older. For every 100 females, there were 82.2 males, and for every 100 females 18 and over, there were 79.2 males.

Almost all (99.4%) residents lived in urban areas, while 0.6% lived in rural areas.

Of the 14,028 households, 22.4% had children under 18 living in them. Married-couple households made up 43.5% of all households, 16.9% had a male householder with no spouse or partner present, and 35.1% had a female householder with no spouse or partner present. Individuals composed 34.2% of all households, and 16.6% had someone living alone who was 65 or older.

Ther city had 15,451 housing units, of which 9.2% were vacant; the homeowner vacancy rate was 2.3% and the rental vacancy rate was 8.3%.

Racial composition as of the 2020 census
Race	Number	Percentage
White	20,016	62.5%
Black or African American	9,136	28.5%
American Indian and Alaska Native	72	0.2%
Asian	649	2.0%
Native Hawaiian and other Pacific Islander	20	0.1%
Some other race	478	1.5%
Two or more races	1,654	5.2%
Hispanic or Latino (of any race)	1,217	3.8%

=== 2010 census ===
At the 2010 census, 29,524 people and 12,773 households lived in Aiken, with a population density of 1,416.3 inhabitants per square mile (546.8/km^{2}). The 14,162 housing units had an average density of 703.1 per square mile (271.5/km^{2}). The racial makeup of the city was 66.8% White, 28.5% Black or African American, 0.25% Native American, 1.28% Asian, 0.45% from other races, and 1.09% from two or more races. Hispanics or Latinos of any race were 2.6% of the population.

Of the 10,287 households, 28.1% had children under 18 living with them, 48.9% were married couples living together, 13.7% had a female householder with no husband present, and 34.3% were not families. About 29.6% of all households were made up of individuals, and 11.6% had someone living alone who was 65 or older. The average household size was 2.34, and the average family size was 2.90.

In the city, the age distribution was 23.2% under 18, 9.4% from 18 to 24, 25.5% from 25 to 44, 24.0% from 45 to 64, and 17.8% who were 65 or older. The median age was 40 years. For every 100 females, there were 87.2 males. For every 100 females 18 and over, there were 83.0 males.

The median income in the city for a household was $49,100 and for a family was $63,520. Males had a median income of $51,988 versus $28,009 for females. The per capita income for the city was $24,129. About 10.1% of families and 14.4% of the population were below the poverty line, including 21.0% of those under 18 and 10.5% of those 65 or over.

== Government ==
Aiken is governed via a council–manager system. A mayor is elected at-large. The city council consists of six members, all elected from single-member districts.

- Mayor: Teddy Milner
- District 1: Gail Diggs
- District 2: Lessie Price
- District 3: Kay Brohl
- District 4: Ed Girardeau
- District 5: Andrea Neira Gregory
- District 6: Ed Woltz

=== Previous mayors ===
Aiken has had four previous mayors as of November 7, 2023, when Teddy Milner became the fifth mayor of Aiken. The previous mayors include:

- Dr. Edward Holbrook Wyman Sr. (1942–1946; died during his second term) – served for 4 years.
- H. Odell Weeks (1946–1990; retired) – served for 44 years.
- Fred Cavanaugh (1991–2015; retired) – served for 24 years.
- Rick Osbon (2015–2023; lost re-election to Teddy Milner) – served for 8 years.

== Historic places ==
- Aiken Golf Club
- Aiken Polo Club
- Aiken Preparatory School
- Aiken Tennis Club
- Hitchcock Woods
- Hopelands Gardens
- Old Aiken Post Office
- Palmetto Golf Club
- St. Mary Help of Christians Catholic Church
- Whitehall mansion
- The Aiken Colored Cemetery, Aiken Mile Track, Aiken Training Track, Aiken Winter Colony Historic District I, Aiken Winter Colony Historic District II, Aiken Winter Colony Historic District III, Chancellor James P. Carroll House, Chinaberry, Coker Spring, Court Tennis Building, Crossways, Dawson-Vanderhorst House, Immanuel School, Joye Cottage, Legare-Morgan House, Phelps House, Pickens House, St. Mary Help of Christians Church, St. Thaddeus Episcopal Church, Charles E. Simons, Jr. Federal Court House, Whitehall, and Willcox's are listed on the National Register of Historic Places.

== Education ==
Aiken is within the Aiken County Public School District.

=== Schools ===
- Public schools:
  - Aiken Elementary School
  - Aiken High School
  - Aiken Intermediate School
  - Aiken Scholars Academy
  - Chukker Creek Elementary
  - East Aiken School of the Arts
  - JD Lever Elementary School
  - Jackson STEM Middle School
  - Kennedy Middle School
  - Lloyd Kennedy Charter School
  - Millbrook Elementary School
  - North Aiken Elementary School
  - Redcliffe Elementary School
  - Schofield Middle School
  - Silver Bluff High School
  - South Aiken High School
- Private schools:
  - Aiken Christian School
  - Mead Hall Episcopal School
  - Palmetto Academy Day School
  - St. Mary Help of Christians Catholic School
  - Second Baptist Christian Preparatory School
  - South Aiken Baptist Christian School
  - Town Creek Christian Academy
- Charter schools:
  - Lloyd Kennedy Charter School
  - Tall Pines Stem Academy
  - Horse Creek Academy

=== Colleges and universities ===
- Aiken Technical College
- University of South Carolina Aiken

=== Library ===
Aiken has a public library, a branch of the ABBE Regional Library System.

== Steeplechase racing ==
The Aiken Steeplechase Association, founded in 1930, hosts the Imperial Cup each March and the Holiday Cup in October, both races sanctioned by the National Steeplechase Association. This event draws more than 30,000 spectators.

The Aiken Thoroughbred Racing Hall of Fame and Museum was established in 1977 as a tribute to the famous flat racing and steeplechase Thoroughbred horses trained at the Aiken Training Track.

== Other events ==
Aiken hosts many polo matches at its numerous polo fields. Other local events include:

- Aiken Triple Crown
- Aiken's Makin'
- Battle of Aiken Reenactment
- Bluegrass Festival
- Fall Steeplechase
- Hops and Hogs
- The Lobster Races
- Western Carolina State Fair
- The Whiskey Road Race
- Aiken City Limits

== Attractions ==
- Aiken Center for Arts hosts educational classes, a fine arts gallery, and exhibition opportunities.
- Aiken County Farmers Market is the oldest food market in South Carolina.
- Aiken County Historical Museum, also known as "Banksia" after the banksia rose, displays special exhibits of items from residents.
- Aiken State Park
- Aiken Thoroughbred Racing Hall of Fame and Museum displays the area's Thoroughbred history
- Aiken Visitors Center and Train Museum, a former railroad depot, has nine dioramas depicting railroad history on the second floor.
- Center for African American History, Art, and Culture hosts special events on African-American history.
- DuPont Planetarium and RPSEC Observatory provides live presentations of stars, constellations, and visible planets.
- Hitchcock Woods is one of the largest urban forests in the United States, at 2100 acres.
- Juilliard in Aiken provides live artistic performances, classes, lectures, and workshops.
- Redcliffe Plantation State Historic Site depicts slaves' and owners' lives.
- Rose Hill Estate is an historic housing estate.

== Notable people ==
In the late 19th and early 20th centuries, Aiken served as a winter residence for many of the country's wealthiest families, such as the Vanderbilts, Bostwicks, and the Whitneys.

- Lee Atwater, Republican strategist, advisor to Ronald Reagan and George H. W. Bush, was raised in Aiken.
- Eric Barnes, college soccer player and coach
- John Berry , an American country music artist. Born in Aiken.
- Charles E. Bohlen, U.S. diplomat, was raised in Aiken.
- George H. Bostwick, court tennis player, steeplechase jockey and horse trainer
- Julia Brownley, U.S. representative for California
- Wesley Bryan, PGA Tour golfer
- Anna Camp, actress, played Sarah Newlin in the HBO series True Blood and Aubrey in the film Pitch Perfect.
- Jimmy Carter, boxer, member of the International Boxing Hall of Fame
- Barney Chavous, NFL player for the Denver Broncos
- Corey Chavous, NFL player
- F. Ambrose Clark, equestrian, heir to the Singer Sewing Machine Company fortune
- Robert C. De Large, U.S. representative for South Carolina
- Pam Durban, novelist and short-story writer
- Matilda Evans, first African-American woman licensed to practice medicine in South Carolina
- Leon Everette, country musician known for writing "Hurricane"
- George Frazier Miller, Episcopal rector
- Helen Lee Franklin, teacher and social-justice advocate
- Julie Noegel Hardaway, President General of the United Daughters of the Confederacy
- Thomas Hitchcock and wife Louise founded the Palmetto Golf Club
- Tommy Hitchcock, Jr., polo player, veteran of the Lafayette Escadrille in World War I, killed in World War II
- Hope Goddard Iselin, wife of Charles Oliver Iselin and original owner of Hopeland Gardens
- Etta Jones, jazz singer
- Kevin Kisner, PGA Tour golfer
- DeMarcus Lawrence, American football linebacker for the Dallas Cowboys
- Leon Lott, commander of the South Carolina State Guard and shheriff of Richland County
- Devereux Milburn, senior partner at J.P. Morgan & Company, a 10-goal polo player
- James "Bubber" Miley trumpeter
- Janie L. Mines, first African-American woman to graduate from the U.S. Naval Academy (1980)
- Marion Naifeh, author and educator
- Steven Naifeh, Pulitzer Prize-winning author, abstract artist
- Eugene Odum, author of Fundamentals of Ecology, founded Savannah River Ecology Laboratory
- Michael Dean Perry, former NFL defensive lineman
- William "Refrigerator" Perry, former NFL defensive lineman
- Frederick H. Prince, financier
- William S. Reyburn, U.S. representative for Pennsylvania's 2nd congressional district
- Camden Riviere, world champion real tennis player
- Pat Sawilowsky, past president of the National Ladies Auxiliary of Jewish War Veterans
- Charlie Simpkins, silver medalist, triple jump, 1992 Summer Olympics
- Gregory White Smith, Pulitzer Prize-winning author
- Marion Hartzog Smoak, lawyer, United States diplomat, and South Carolina state senator
- Grace Taylor, gymnast
- Dekoda Watson, linebacker with San Francisco 49ers and Tampa Bay Buccaneers
- William C. Whitney, helped establish "Winter Colony," a 69-room winter residence
- Paul Wight (Big Show), professional wrestler and actor
- Troy Williamson, professional football player
- Gamel Woolsey, writer, coined the phrase "pornography of violence"
- Priscilla A. Wooten, politician who served in the New York City Council from 1983 - 2001
- Marly Youmans, novelist and poet

== See also ==
- List of municipalities in South Carolina
