= List of municipalities in South Carolina =

Map of the United States with South Carolina highlighted

South Carolina is a state located in the Southern United States. According to the 2020 United States census, South Carolina is the 23rd-most populous state with 5,118,425 inhabitants, but the 11th-smallest by land area spanning 30,060.70 sq mi (77,856.9 km^{2}) of land. South Carolina is divided into 46 counties and contains 271 municipalities consisting of 71 cities and 200 towns. South Carolina's municipalities cover only 6.2% of the state's land mass but are home to 36.8% of its population.

At incorporation, municipalities may choose to be named either "City of" or "Town of", however there is no legal difference between the two. All municipalities are responsible for providing local service including law enforcement, fire protection, waste and water management, planning and zoning, recreational facilities, and street lighting. Municipalities may incorporate with one of three forms of government: 141 chose mayor–council, 95 chose council (weak mayor), and 33 chose council–manager. Under the mayor–council form of government, an elected municipal council is composed of a mayor and four or more council members.

The mayor's responsibilities include: staffing of all municipal employees; directing and supervising the administration of all departments, offices, and agencies; voting in, and presiding over, council meetings; and preparing the annual budget (with council), capital program (with council), and public financial reports. Under the council (weak mayor) form of government, the council can be composed of five, seven or nine members including the mayor, all elected, and each with one vote on council. The council has the power to levy taxes and raise funds from other sources that match the operating and capital budgets. Under the council–manager form of government, the council is composed of a mayor and four, six, or eight councilmen each with one vote. The municipality must employ a manager, establish administrative departments upon recommendation of the manager, adopt an annual budget, provide an independent annual audit of the books and business affairs of the municipality, provide for the general health and welfare of the municipality, and enact ordinances of any nature and kind. The manager is the head of the administrative branch of the municipal government and is responsible for staffing (including the hiring, firing and compensation of all municipal employees), preparing the annual budget and financial report for council adoption.

The largest municipality by population in South Carolina is the city of Charleston with 150,227 residents, and the smallest municipality by population is Cope with 37 residents. The largest municipality by land area is Columbia which spans 137.188 mi^{2} (355.32 km^{2}), while Jenkinsville is the smallest at 0.089 mi^{2} (0.23 km^{2}).

== List of municipalities ==
Most populous municipalities in South Carolina

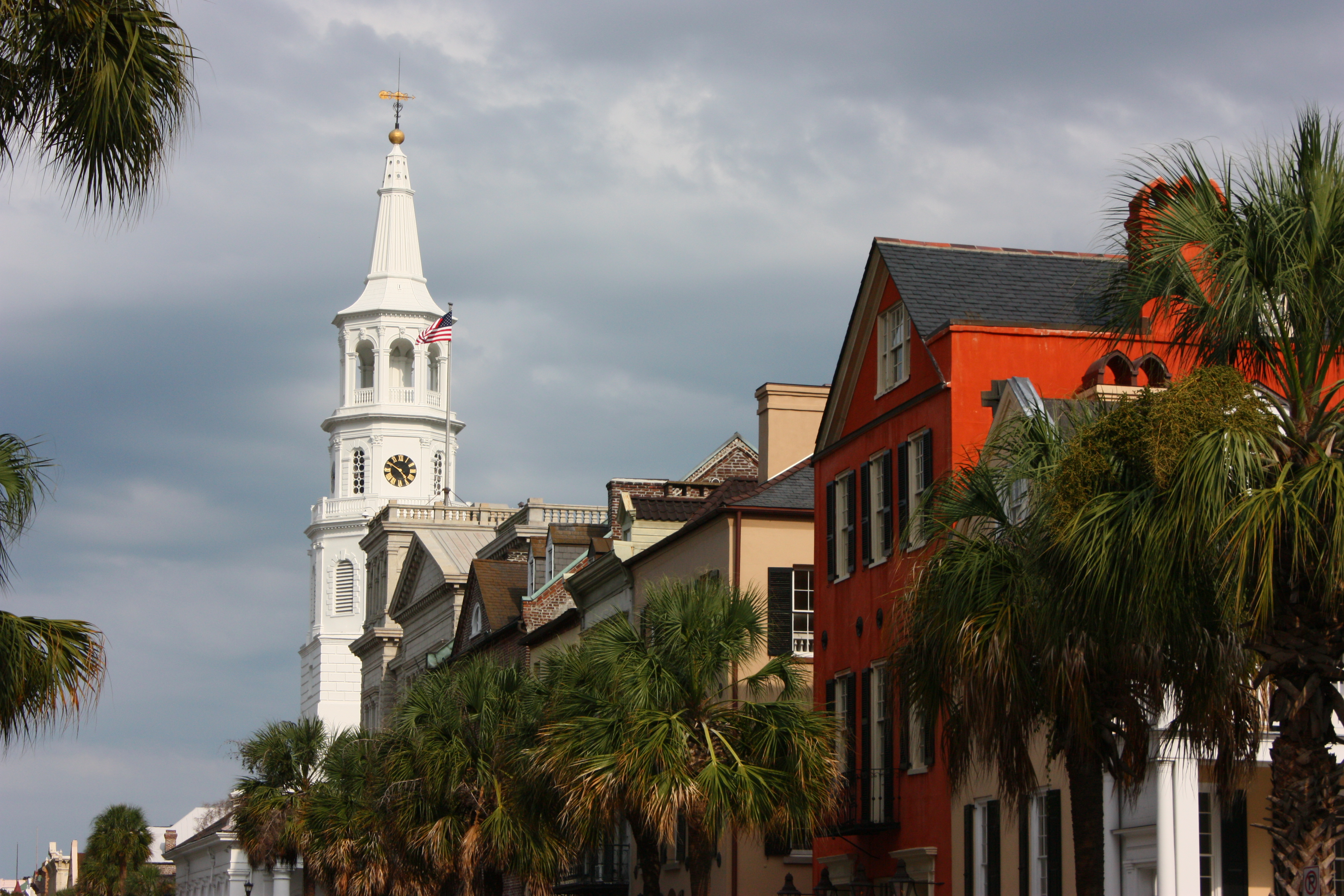
Charleston, the most populous municipality in South Carolina

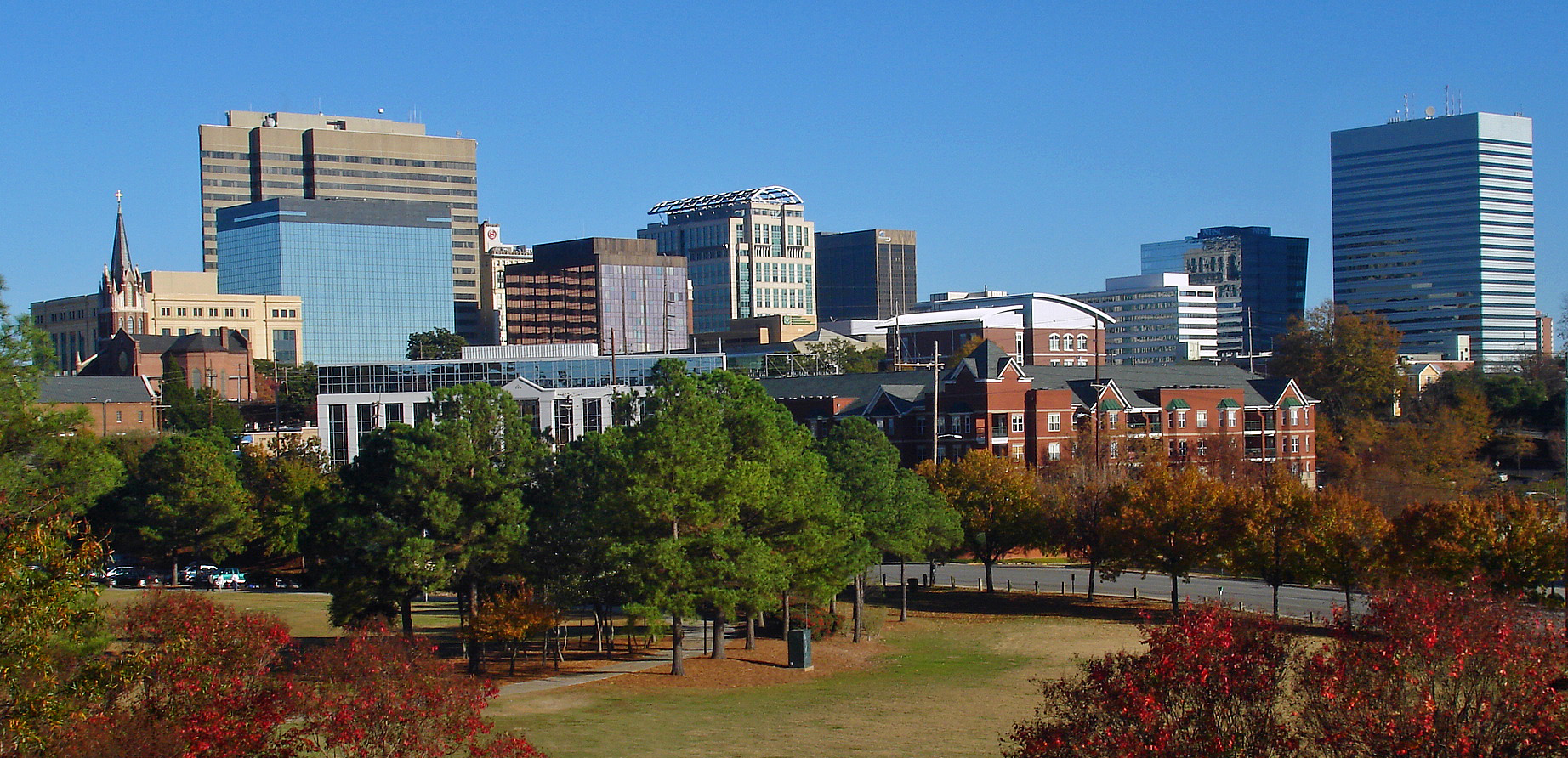
Skyline of Columbia, the capital and second-most populous municipality in South Carolina

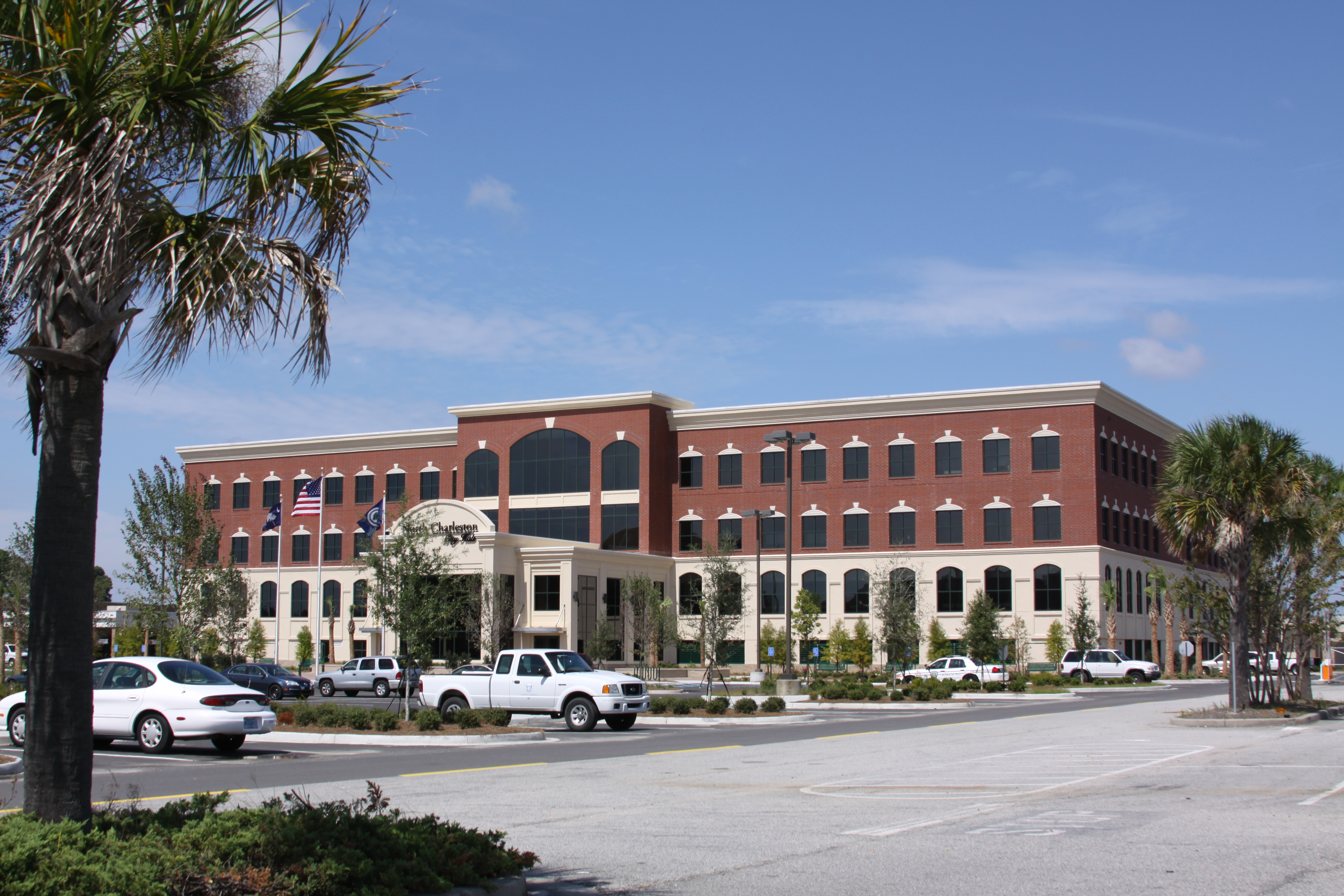
City Hall of North Charleston, a suburb of Charleston and third-most populous municipality in South Carolina

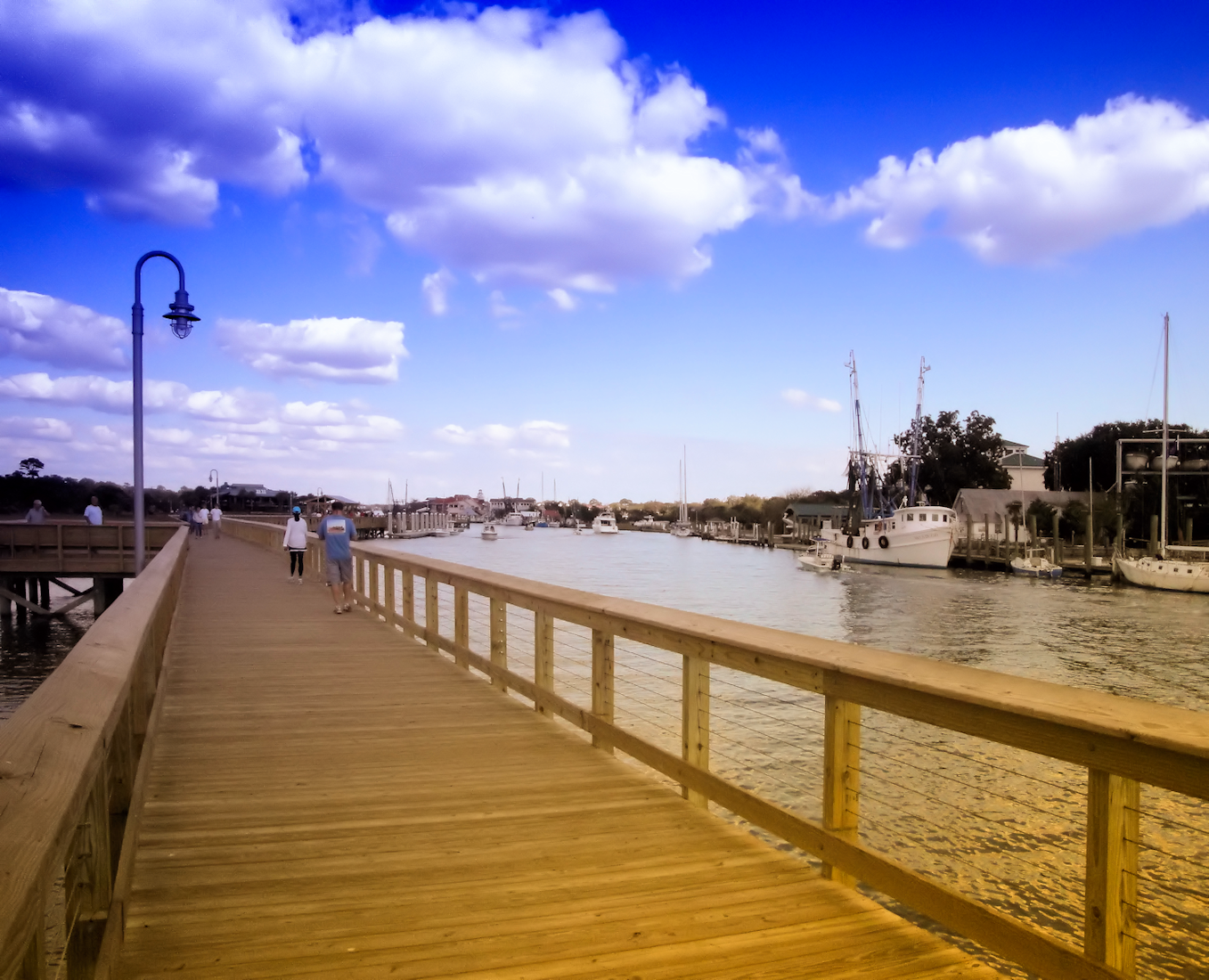
Mount Pleasant, a suburb of Charleston and South Carolina's fourth-most populous municipality

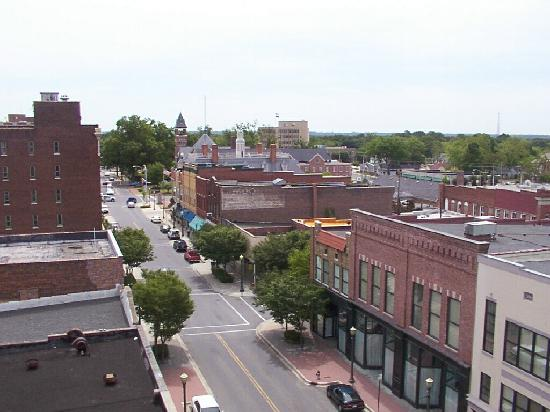
Downtown Rock Hill, a suburb of Charlotte, North Carolina, and the fifth-most populous municipality in South Carolina

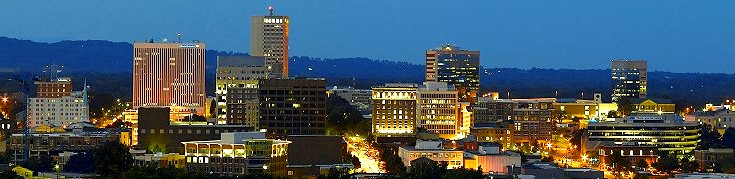
Skyline of Greenville, South Carolina's sixth-most populous municipality

‡ State capital and county seat

† County seat

Name	Type	Government type	County	Population (2020)	Population (2010)	Change (%)	Land area (2021)		Population density
Name	Type	Government type	County	Population (2020)	Population (2010)	Change (%)	sq mi	km^{2}	Population density
Abbeville†	City	Council–manager	Abbeville	4,874	5,237	−6.9%	6.215	16.10	784.2/sq mi (302.8/km^{2})
Aiken†	City	Council–manager	Aiken	32,025	29,524	+8.5%	21.199	54.91	1,510.7/sq mi (583.3/km^{2})
Allendale†	Town	Council (weak mayor)	Allendale	2,694	3,482	−22.6%	3.31	8.6	813.9/sq mi (314.2/km^{2})
Anderson†	City	Council–manager	Anderson	28,106	26,686	+5.3%	14.727	38.14	1,908.5/sq mi (736.9/km^{2})
Andrews	Town	Mayor–council	Georgetown; Williamsburg	2,575	2,861	−10.0%	2.205	5.71	1,167.8/sq mi (450.9/km^{2})
Arcadia Lakes	Town	Council (weak mayor)	Richland	865	861	+0.5%	0.557	1.44	1,553.0/sq mi (599.6/km^{2})
Atlantic Beach	Town	Council–manager	Horry	195	334	−41.6%	0.162	0.4	1,203.7/sq mi (464.8/km^{2})
Awendaw	Town	Council (weak mayor)	Charleston	1,399	1,294	+8.1%	17.346	44.93	80.7/sq mi (31.1/km^{2})
Aynor	Town	Mayor–council	Horry	974	560	+73.9%	1.802	4.67	540.5/sq mi (208.7/km^{2})
Bamberg†	City	Mayor–council	Bamberg	3,076	3,607	−14.7%	3.575	9.26	860.4/sq mi (332.2/km^{2})
Barnwell†	City	Council (weak mayor)	Barnwell	4,652	4,750	−2.1%	7.842	20.31	593.2/sq mi (229.0/km^{2})
Batesburg-Leesville	Town	Council–manager	Lexington; Saluda	5,270	5,362	−1.7%	8.195	21.22	643.1/sq mi (248.3/km^{2})
Beaufort†	City	Council–manager	Beaufort	13,607	12,361	+10.1%	24.434	63.28	556.9/sq mi (215.0/km^{2})
Belton	City	Council (weak mayor)	Anderson	4,335	4,134	+4.9%	3.778	9.78	1,147.4/sq mi (443.0/km^{2})
Bennettsville†	City	Council (weak mayor)	Marlboro	7,020	9,069	−22.6%	6.167	15.97	1,138.3/sq mi (439.5/km^{2})
Bethune	Town	Mayor–council	Kershaw	315	334	−5.7%	1.102	2.85	285.8/sq mi (110.4/km^{2})
Bishopville†	Town	Council (weak mayor)	Lee	3,024	3,471	−12.9%	2.337	6.05	1,294.0/sq mi (499.6/km^{2})
Blacksburg	Town	Council (weak mayor)	Cherokee	1,889	1,848	+2.2%	1.871	4.85	1,009.6/sq mi (389.8/km^{2})
Blackville	Town	Mayor–council	Barnwell	1,923	2,406	−20.1%	8.932	23.13	215.3/sq mi (83.1/km^{2})
Blenheim	Town	Mayor–council	Marlboro	115	154	−25.3%	0.653	1.69	176.1/sq mi (68.0/km^{2})
Bluffton	Town	Council–manager	Beaufort	27,716	12,530	+121.2%	51.968	134.60	533.3/sq mi (205.9/km^{2})
Blythewood	Town	Mayor–council	Richland; Fairfield	4,772	2,034	+134.6%	10.629	27.53	449.0/sq mi (173.3/km^{2})
Bonneau	Town	Mayor–council	Berkeley	431	487	−11.5%	3.024	7.83	142.5/sq mi (55.0/km^{2})
Bowman	Town	Mayor–council	Orangeburg	788	968	−18.6%	1.177	3.05	669.5/sq mi (258.5/km^{2})
Branchville	Town	Council (weak mayor)	Orangeburg	998	1,024	−2.5%	3.167	8.20	315.1/sq mi (121.7/km^{2})
Briarcliffe Acres	Town	Mayor–council	Horry	479	457	+4.8%	0.636	1.65	753.1/sq mi (290.8/km^{2})
Brunson	Town	Mayor–council	Hampton	431	554	−22.2%	1.017	2.63	423.8/sq mi (163.6/km^{2})
Burnettown	Town	Mayor–council	Aiken	3,105	2,673	+16.2%	5.51	14.3	563.5/sq mi (217.6/km^{2})
Calhoun Falls	Town	Council (weak mayor)	Abbeville	1,727	2,004	−13.8%	3.387	8.77	509.9/sq mi (196.9/km^{2})
Camden†	City	Council–manager	Kershaw	7,788	6,838	+13.9%	11.061	28.65	704.1/sq mi (271.9/km^{2})
Cameron	Town	Mayor–council	Calhoun	376	424	−11.3%	3.125	8.09	120.3/sq mi (46.5/km^{2})
Campobello	Town	Council (weak mayor)	Spartanburg	675	502	+34.5%	2.782	7.21	242.6/sq mi (93.7/km^{2})
Carlisle	Town	Council (weak mayor)	Union	321	436	−26.4%	1.416	3.67	226.7/sq mi (87.5/km^{2})
Cayce	City	Council–manager	Lexington; Richland	13,781	12,528	+10.0%	16.936	43.86	813.7/sq mi (314.2/km^{2})
Central	Town	Council (weak mayor)	Pickens	5,247	5,159	+1.7%	2.783	7.21	1,885.4/sq mi (727.9/km^{2})
Central Pacolet	Town	Mayor–council	Spartanburg	209	216	−3.2%	0.236	0.6	885.6/sq mi (341.9/km^{2})
Chapin	Town	Mayor–council	Lexington	1,809	1,445	+25.2%	1.98	5.1	913.6/sq mi (352.8/km^{2})
Charleston†	City	Mayor–council	Charleston; Berkeley	150,227	120,083	+25.1%	114.793	297.31	1,308.7/sq mi (505.3/km^{2})
Cheraw	Town	Mayor–council	Chesterfield	5,040	5,851	−13.9%	5.953	15.42	846.6/sq mi (326.9/km^{2})
Chesnee	City	Mayor–council	Spartanburg; Cherokee	829	868	−4.5%	1.071	2.77	774.0/sq mi (298.9/km^{2})
Chester†	City	Council (weak mayor)	Chester	5,269	5,607	−6.0%	3.306	8.56	1,593.8/sq mi (615.4/km^{2})
Chesterfield†	Town	Mayor–council	Chesterfield	1,357	1,472	−7.8%	4.062	10.52	334.1/sq mi (129.0/km^{2})
Clemson	City	Council (weak mayor)	Pickens; Anderson	17,681	13,905	+27.2%	7.549	19.55	2,342.2/sq mi (904.3/km^{2})
Clinton	City	Council–manager	Laurens	7,633	8,490	−10.1%	10.331	26.76	738.8/sq mi (285.3/km^{2})
Clio	Town	Council (weak mayor)	Marlboro	608	726	−16.3%	0.856	2.22	710.3/sq mi (274.2/km^{2})
Clover	Town	Council (weak mayor)	York	6,671	5,094	+31.0%	4.547	11.78	1,467.1/sq mi (566.5/km^{2})
Columbia‡	City	Council–manager	Richland; Lexington	136,632	129,272	+5.7%	137.188	355.32	995.9/sq mi (384.5/km^{2})
Conway†	City	Council (weak mayor)	Horry	24,809	17,103	+45.1%	23.831	61.72	1,041.0/sq mi (401.9/km^{2})
Cope	Town	Mayor–council	Orangeburg	37	77	−51.9%	0.25	0.6	148.0/sq mi (57.1/km^{2})
Cordova	Town	Mayor–council	Orangeburg	136	169	−19.5%	0.436	1.13	311.9/sq mi (120.4/km^{2})
Cottageville	Town	Mayor–council	Colleton	701	762	−8.0%	3.416	8.85	205.2/sq mi (79.2/km^{2})
Coward	Town	Council (weak mayor)	Florence	748	752	−0.5%	3.531	9.15	211.8/sq mi (81.8/km^{2})
Cowpens	Town	Council (weak mayor)	Spartanburg	2,023	2,162	−6.4%	2.295	5.94	881.5/sq mi (340.3/km^{2})
Cross Hill	Town	Mayor–council	Laurens	404	507	−20.3%	3.186	8.25	126.8/sq mi (49.0/km^{2})
Darlington†	City	Council–manager	Darlington	6,149	6,289	−2.2%	4.638	12.01	1,325.8/sq mi (511.9/km^{2})
Denmark	City	Mayor–council	Bamberg	3,186	3,538	−9.9%	3.906	10.12	815.7/sq mi (314.9/km^{2})
Dillon†	City	Council–manager	Dillon	6,384	6,788	−6.0%	5.293	13.71	1,206.1/sq mi (465.7/km^{2})
Donalds	Town	Mayor–council	Abbeville	328	348	−5.7%	0.832	2.15	394.2/sq mi (152.2/km^{2})
Due West	Town	Mayor–council	Abbeville	1,219	1,247	−2.2%	1.635	4.23	745.6/sq mi (287.9/km^{2})
Duncan	Town	Council (weak mayor)	Spartanburg	4,041	3,181	+27.0%	5.277	13.67	765.8/sq mi (295.7/km^{2})
Easley	City	Mayor–council	Pickens; Anderson	22,921	19,993	+14.6%	12.904	33.42	1,776.3/sq mi (685.8/km^{2})
Eastover	Town	Mayor–council	Richland	614	813	−24.5%	1.214	3.14	505.8/sq mi (195.3/km^{2})
Edgefield†	Town	Mayor–council	Edgefield	2,322	4,750	−51.1%	4.203	10.89	552.5/sq mi (213.3/km^{2})
Edisto Beach	Town	Council (weak mayor)	Colleton	1,033	414	+149.5%	2.137	5.53	483.4/sq mi (186.6/km^{2})
Ehrhardt	Town	Mayor–council	Bamberg	457	545	−16.1%	3.112	8.06	146.9/sq mi (56.7/km^{2})
Elgin	Town	Mayor–council	Kershaw	1,634	1,311	+24.6%	1.081	2.80	1,511.6/sq mi (583.6/km^{2})
Elko	Town	Mayor–council	Barnwell	140	193	−27.5%	1.049	2.72	133.5/sq mi (51.5/km^{2})
Elloree	Town	Mayor–council	Orangeburg	570	692	−17.6%	1.014	2.63	562.1/sq mi (217.0/km^{2})
Estill	Town	Council (weak mayor)	Hampton	1,821	2,040	−10.7%	3.23	8.4	563.8/sq mi (217.7/km^{2})
Eutawville	Town	Mayor–council	Orangeburg	235	315	−25.4%	0.952	2.47	246.8/sq mi (95.3/km^{2})
Fairfax	Town	Council (weak mayor)	Allendale	1,505	2,025	−25.7%	3.312	8.58	454.4/sq mi (175.4/km^{2})
Florence†	City	Council–manager	Florence	39,899	37,056	+7.7%	23.395	60.59	1,662.7/sq mi (642.0/km^{2})
Folly Beach	City	Mayor–council	Charleston	2,078	2,617	−20.6%	12.507	32.39	166.1/sq mi (64.1/km^{2})
Forest Acres	City	Council (weak mayor)	Richland	10,617	10,361	+2.5%	4.603	11.92	2,306.5/sq mi (890.6/km^{2})
Fort Lawn	Town	Mayor–council	Chester	962	895	+7.5%	1.393	3.61	690.6/sq mi (266.6/km^{2})
Fort Mill	Town	Council–manager	York	24,521	10,811	+126.8%	19.641	50.87	1,248.5/sq mi (482.0/km^{2})
Fountain Inn	City	Mayor–council	Greenville; Laurens	10,416	7,799	+33.6%	8.224	21.30	1,266.5/sq mi (489.0/km^{2})
Furman	Town	Council (weak mayor)	Hampton	224	239	−6.3%	3.118	8.08	71.8/sq mi (27.7/km^{2})
Gaffney†	City	Council (weak mayor)	Cherokee	12,764	12,414	+2.8%	8.307	21.52	1,536.5/sq mi (593.3/km^{2})
Gaston	Town	Mayor–council	Lexington	1,608	1,645	−2.2%	5.315	13.77	302.5/sq mi (116.8/km^{2})
Georgetown†	City	Mayor–council	Georgetown	8,403	9,163	−8.3%	6.992	18.11	1,201.8/sq mi (464.0/km^{2})
Gifford	Town	Mayor–council	Hampton	257	288	−10.8%	0.967	2.50	265.8/sq mi (102.6/km^{2})
Gilbert	Town	Council (weak mayor)	Lexington	571	565	+1.1%	2.71	7.0	210.7/sq mi (81.4/km^{2})
Goose Creek	City	Mayor–council	Berkeley; Charleston	45,946	35,938	+27.8%	42.26	109.5	1,087.2/sq mi (419.8/km^{2})
Govan	Town	Mayor–council	Bamberg	56	65	−13.8%	0.752	1.95	74.5/sq mi (28.8/km^{2})
Gray Court	Town	Mayor–council	Laurens	763	795	−4.0%	1.839	4.76	414.9/sq mi (160.2/km^{2})
Great Falls	Town	Council (weak mayor)	Chester	1,951	1,979	−1.4%	4.239	10.98	460.3/sq mi (177.7/km^{2})
Greeleyville	Town	Mayor–council	Williamsburg	384	438	−12.3%	1.223	3.17	314.0/sq mi (121.2/km^{2})
Greenville†	City	Council–manager	Greenville	70,720	58,409	+21.1%	29.762	77.08	2,376.2/sq mi (917.4/km^{2})
Greenwood†	City	Council–manager	Greenwood	22,545	23,222	−2.9%	16.341	42.32	1,379.7/sq mi (532.7/km^{2})
Greer	City	Council (weak mayor)	Greenville; Spartanburg	35,308	25,515	+38.4%	23.545	60.98	1,499.6/sq mi (579.0/km^{2})
Hampton†	Town	Council (weak mayor)	Hampton	2,694	2,808	−4.1%	4.513	11.69	596.9/sq mi (230.5/km^{2})
Hanahan	City	Council (weak mayor)	Berkeley	20,325	17,997	+12.9%	10.531	27.28	1,930.0/sq mi (745.2/km^{2})
Hardeeville	City	Council–manager	Jasper	7,473	2,952	+153.2%	56.712	146.88	131.8/sq mi (50.9/km^{2})
Harleyville	Town	Mayor–council	Dorchester	666	677	−1.6%	1.057	2.74	630.1/sq mi (243.3/km^{2})
Hartsville	City	Council–manager	Darlington	7,446	7,764	−4.1%	6.052	15.67	1,230.3/sq mi (475.0/km^{2})
Heath Springs	Town	Council (weak mayor)	Lancaster	742	790	−6.1%	1.625	4.21	456.6/sq mi (176.3/km^{2})
Hemingway	Town	Council (weak mayor)	Williamsburg	504	459	+9.8%	0.864	2.24	583.3/sq mi (225.2/km^{2})
Hickory Grove	Town	Mayor–council	York	449	440	+2.0%	1.67	4.3	268.9/sq mi (103.8/km^{2})
Hilda	Town	Mayor–council	Barnwell	418	447	−6.5%	3.07	8.0	136.2/sq mi (52.6/km^{2})
Hilton Head Island	Town	Council–manager	Beaufort	37,661	37,099	+1.5%	41.353	107.10	910.7/sq mi (351.6/km^{2})
Hodges	Town	Mayor–council	Greenwood	162	155	+4.5%	0.781	2.02	207.4/sq mi (80.1/km^{2})
Holly Hill	Town	Mayor–council	Orangeburg	1,298	1,277	+1.6%	1.307	3.39	993.1/sq mi (383.4/km^{2})
Hollywood	Town	Mayor–council	Charleston	5,339	4,714	+13.3%	23.534	60.95	226.9/sq mi (87.6/km^{2})
Honea Path	Town	Mayor–council	Anderson; Abbeville	3,686	3,597	+2.5%	3.514	9.10	1,048.9/sq mi (405.0/km^{2})
Inman	City	Council (weak mayor)	Spartanburg	2,990	2,321	+28.8%	1.73	4.5	1,728.3/sq mi (667.3/km^{2})
Irmo	Town	Council (weak mayor)	Lexington; Richland	11,569	11,097	+4.3%	6.9	18	1,676.7/sq mi (647.4/km^{2})
Isle of Palms	City	Council (weak mayor)	Charleston	4,347	4,133	+5.2%	4.436	11.49	979.9/sq mi (378.4/km^{2})
Iva	Town	Mayor–council	Anderson	1,015	1,218	−16.7%	1.024	2.65	991.2/sq mi (382.7/km^{2})
Jackson	Town	Mayor–council	Aiken	1,521	1,700	−10.5%	3.52	9.1	432.1/sq mi (166.8/km^{2})
James Island (Note: The town incorporated in 2012 and is thus not represented in the 2010 census.)	Town	Mayor–council	Charleston	11,621	—	—	4.744	12.29	2,449.6/sq mi (945.8/km^{2})
Jamestown	Town	Mayor–council	Berkeley	68	72	−5.6%	0.606	1.57	112.2/sq mi (43.3/km^{2})
Jefferson	Town	Council (weak mayor)	Chesterfield	772	753	+2.5%	1.802	4.67	37.7/sq mi (14.6/km^{2})
Jenkinsville	Town	Mayor–council	Fairfield	40	46	−13.0%	0.089	0.2	449.4/sq mi (173.5/km^{2})
Johnsonville	City	Council (weak mayor)	Florence	1,378	1,480	−6.9%	2.114	5.48	651.8/sq mi (251.7/km^{2})
Johnston	Town	Mayor–council	Edgefield	1,997	2,362	−15.5%	2.648	6.86	892.0/sq mi (344.4/km^{2})
Jonesville	Town	Council (weak mayor)	Union	852	911	−6.5%	1.015	2.63	839.4/sq mi (324.1/km^{2})
Kershaw	Town	Council (weak mayor)	Lancaster	1,693	1,803	−6.1%	2.07	5.4	817.9/sq mi (315.8/km^{2})
Kiawah Island	Town	Mayor–council	Charleston	2,013	1,626	+23.8%	11.171	28.93	180.2/sq mi (69.6/km^{2})
Kingstree†	Town	Council–manager	Williamsburg	3,244	3,328	−2.5%	3.18	8.2	1,020.1/sq mi (393.9/km^{2})
Kline	Town	Mayor–council	Barnwell	148	197	−24.9%	3.106	8.04	47.6/sq mi (18.4/km^{2})
Lake City	City	Mayor–council	Florence	5,903	6,675	−11.6%	5.341	13.83	1,105.2/sq mi (426.7/km^{2})
Lake View	Town	Mayor–council	Dillon	764	807	−5.3%	1.694	4.39	451.0/sq mi (174.1/km^{2})
Lamar	Town	Mayor–council	Darlington	862	989	−12.8%	1.225	3.17	703.7/sq mi (271.7/km^{2})
Lancaster†	City	Council (weak mayor)	Lancaster	8,460	8,526	−0.8%	6.566	17.01	1,288.5/sq mi (497.5/km^{2})
Landrum	City	Council (weak mayor)	Spartanburg	2,481	2,376	+4.4%	2.666	6.90	930.6/sq mi (359.3/km^{2})
Lane	Town	Mayor–council	Williamsburg	472	508	−7.1%	3.95	10.2	119.5/sq mi (46.1/km^{2})
Latta	Town	Council (weak mayor)	Dillon	1,296	1,379	−6.0%	1.096	2.84	1,182.5/sq mi (456.6/km^{2})
Laurens†	City	Mayor–council	Laurens	9,335	9,139	+2.1%	9.841	25.49	948.6/sq mi (366.2/km^{2})
Lexington†	Town	Council (weak mayor)	Lexington	23,568	17,870	+31.9%	11.838	30.66	1,990.9/sq mi (768.7/km^{2})
Liberty	City	Mayor–council	Pickens	3,366	3,269	+3.0%	4.45	11.5	756.4/sq mi (292.0/km^{2})
Lincolnville	Town	Mayor–council	Charleston; Dorchester	1,147	1,139	+0.7%	1.169	3.03	981.2/sq mi (378.8/km^{2})
Little Mountain	Town	Mayor–council	Newberry	249	291	−14.4%	1.52	3.9	163.8/sq mi (63.2/km^{2})
Livingston	Town	Council (weak mayor)	Orangeburg	132	136	−2.9%	0.787	2.04	167.7/sq mi (64.8/km^{2})
Lockhart	Town	Mayor–council	Union	384	488	−21.3%	0.305	0.8	1,259.0/sq mi (486.1/km^{2})
Lodge	Town	Mayor–council	Colleton	82	120	−31.7%	3.144	8.14	26.1/sq mi (10.1/km^{2})
Loris	City	Council (weak mayor)	Horry	2,449	2,396	+2.2%	4.553	11.79	537.9/sq mi (207.7/km^{2})
Lowndesville	Town	Mayor–council	Abbeville	120	128	−6.2%	0.775	2.01	154.8/sq mi (59.8/km^{2})
Lowrys	Town	Mayor–council	Chester	184	200	−8.0%	3.161	8.19	58.2/sq mi (22.5/km^{2})
Luray	Town	Mayor–council	Hampton	98	127	−22.8%	1.033	2.68	94.9/sq mi (36.6/km^{2})
Lyman	Town	Council (weak mayor)	Spartanburg	6,173	3,243	+90.3%	6.488	16.80	951.4/sq mi (367.4/km^{2})
Lynchburg	Town	Council (weak mayor)	Lee	318	373	−14.7%	1.132	2.93	280.9/sq mi (108.5/km^{2})
McBee	Town	Council (weak mayor)	Chesterfield	758	867	−12.6%	1.311	3.40	578.2/sq mi (223.2/km^{2})
McClellanville	Town	Council (weak mayor)	Charleston	605	499	+21.2%	2.227	5.77	271.7/sq mi (104.9/km^{2})
McColl	Town	Mayor–council	Marlboro	2,070	2,174	−4.8%	1.05	2.7	1,971.4/sq mi (761.2/km^{2})
McConnells	Town	Council (weak mayor)	York	280	255	+9.8%	3.391	8.78	82.6/sq mi (31.9/km^{2})
McCormick†	Town	Mayor–council	McCormick	2,232	2,783	−19.8%	4.052	10.49	550.8/sq mi (212.7/km^{2})
Manning†	City	Council (weak mayor)	Clarendon	3,878	4,108	−5.6%	2.935	7.60	1,321.3/sq mi (510.2/km^{2})
Marion†	City	Mayor–council	Marion	6,448	6,939	−7.1%	4.477	11.60	1,440.3/sq mi (556.1/km^{2})
Mauldin	City	Council (weak mayor)	Greenville	24,724	22,889	+8.0%	12.068	31.26	2,048.7/sq mi (791.0/km^{2})
Mayesville	Town	Mayor–council	Sumter	548	731	−25.0%	1.024	2.65	535.2/sq mi (206.6/km^{2})
Meggett	Town	Mayor–council	Charleston	1,390	1,226	+13.4%	18.141	46.98	76.6/sq mi (29.6/km^{2})
Moncks Corner†	Town	Mayor–council	Berkeley	13,297	7,885	+68.6%	11.371	29.45	1,169.4/sq mi (451.5/km^{2})
Monetta	Town	Mayor–council	Aiken; Saluda	205	236	−13.1%	0.69	1.8	297.1/sq mi (114.7/km^{2})
Mount Croghan	Town	Council (weak mayor)	Chesterfield	135	195	−30.8%	0.759	1.97	177.9/sq mi (68.7/km^{2})
Mount Pleasant	Town	Council (weak mayor)	Charleston	90,801	67,843	+33.8%	49.528	128.28	1,833.3/sq mi (707.9/km^{2})
Mullins	City	Council (weak mayor)	Marion	4,026	4,663	−13.7%	3.021	7.82	1,332.7/sq mi (514.5/km^{2})
Myrtle Beach	City	Council–manager	Horry	35,682	27,109	+31.6%	23.533	60.95	1,516.3/sq mi (585.4/km^{2})
Neeses	Town	Mayor–council	Orangeburg	320	374	−14.4%	1.707	4.42	187.5/sq mi (72.4/km^{2})
Newberry†	City	Council–manager	Newberry	10,691	10,277	+4.0%	8.991	23.29	1,189.1/sq mi (459.1/km^{2})
New Ellenton	City	Council (weak mayor)	Aiken	2,210	2,052	+7.7%	4.44	11.5	497.7/sq mi (192.2/km^{2})
Nichols	Town	Mayor–council	Marion	234	368	−36.4%	1.336	3.46	175.1/sq mi (67.6/km^{2})
Ninety Six	Town	Mayor–council	Greenwood	2,076	1,998	+3.9%	1.822	4.72	1,139.4/sq mi (439.9/km^{2})
Norris	Town	Council (weak mayor)	Pickens	741	813	−8.9%	1.884	4.88	393.3/sq mi (151.9/km^{2})
North	Town	Mayor–council	Orangeburg	696	754	−7.7%	0.864	2.24	805.6/sq mi (311.0/km^{2})
North Augusta	City	Mayor–council	Aiken; Edgefield	24,379	21,348	+14.2%	21.262	55.07	1,146.6/sq mi (442.7/km^{2})
North Charleston	City	Mayor–council	Charleston; Berkeley; Dorchester	114,852	97,471	+17.8%	77.646	201.10	1,479.2/sq mi (571.1/km^{2})
North Myrtle Beach	City	Council–manager	Horry	18,790	13,752	+36.6%	21.717	56.25	865.2/sq mi (334.1/km^{2})
Norway	Town	Mayor–council	Orangeburg	289	337	−14.2%	0.792	2.05	364.9/sq mi (140.9/km^{2})
Olanta	Town	Mayor–council	Florence	550	563	−2.3%	0.995	2.58	552.8/sq mi (213.4/km^{2})
Olar	Town	Mayor–council	Bamberg	215	257	−16.3%	0.785	2.03	273.9/sq mi (105.7/km^{2})
Orangeburg†	City	Council (weak mayor)	Orangeburg	13,240	13,964	−5.2%	9.009	23.33	1,469.6/sq mi (567.4/km^{2})
Pacolet	Town	Council (weak mayor)	Spartanburg	2,274	2,235	+1.7%	5.803	15.03	391.9/sq mi (151.3/km^{2})
Pageland	Town	Council (weak mayor)	Chesterfield	2,456	2,760	−11.0%	4.324	11.20	568.0/sq mi (219.3/km^{2})
Pamplico	Town	Council (weak mayor)	Florence	1,061	1,226	−13.5%	1.62	4.2	654.9/sq mi (252.9/km^{2})
Parksville	Town	Mayor–council	McCormick	120	117	+2.6%	0.728	1.89	164.8/sq mi (63.6/km^{2})
Patrick	Town	Mayor–council	Chesterfield	266	351	−24.2%	0.959	2.48	277.4/sq mi (107.1/km^{2})
Pawleys Island	Town	Mayor–council	Georgetown	130	103	+26.2%	0.701	1.82	185.4/sq mi (71.6/km^{2})
Paxville	Town	Mayor–council	Clarendon	232	185	+25.4%	1.051	2.72	220.7/sq mi (85.2/km^{2})
Peak	Town	Mayor–council	Newberry	51	64	−20.3%	0.344	0.89	148.3/sq mi (57.2/km^{2})
Pelion	Town	Mayor–council	Lexington	631	674	−6.4%	3.682	9.54	171.4/sq mi (66.2/km^{2})
Pelzer	Town	Mayor–council	Anderson	1,344	89	+1,410.1%	0.914	2	1,470.5/sq mi (567.7/km^{2})
Pendleton	Town	Mayor–council	Anderson	3,489	2,964	+17.7%	4.753	12.31	734.1/sq mi (283.4/km^{2})
Perry	Town	Mayor–council	Aiken	194	233	−16.7%	0.958	2.48	202.5/sq mi (78.2/km^{2})
Pickens†	City	Council (weak mayor)	Pickens	3,388	3,126	+8.4%	2.845	7.37	1,190.9/sq mi (459.8/km^{2})
Pine Ridge	Town	Council (weak mayor)	Lexington	2,167	2,064	+5.0%	4.698	12.17	461.3/sq mi (178.1/km^{2})
Pinewood	Town	Mayor–council	Sumter	503	538	−6.5%	1.071	2.77	469.7/sq mi (181.3/km^{2})
Plum Branch	Town	Mayor–council	McCormick	72	82	−12.2%	0.362	0.9	198.9/sq mi (76.8/km^{2})
Pomaria	Town	Mayor–council	Newberry	127	179	−29.1%	1.046	2.71	121.4/sq mi (46.9/km^{2})
Port Royal	Town	Council–manager	Beaufort	14,220	10,678	+33.2%	16.965	43.94	838.2/sq mi (323.6/km^{2})
Prosperity	Town	Mayor–council	Newberry	1,178	1,180	−0.2%	1.972	5.11	597.4/sq mi (230.6/km^{2})
Quinby	Town	Mayor–council	Florence	915	932	−1.8%	1.307	3.39	700.1/sq mi (270.3/km^{2})
Ravenel	Town	Mayor–council	Charleston	2,542	2,465	+3.1%	13.176	34.13	192.9/sq mi (74.5/km^{2})
Reevesville	Town	Mayor–council	Dorchester	201	196	+2.6%	1.609	4.17	124.9/sq mi (48.2/km^{2})
Reidville	Town	Mayor–council	Spartanburg	1,634	601	+171.9%	1.761	4.56	927.9/sq mi (358.3/km^{2})
Richburg	Town	Mayor–council	Chester	280	275	+1.8%	0.876	2.27	319.6/sq mi (123.4/km^{2})
Ridgeland†	Town	Council (weak mayor)	Jasper	3,758	4,036	−6.9%	48.34	125.2	77.7/sq mi (30.0/km^{2})
Ridge Spring	Town	Mayor–council	Saluda	579	737	−21.4%	1.822	4.72	317.8/sq mi (122.7/km^{2})
Ridgeville	Town	Mayor–council	Dorchester	1,672	1,979	−15.5%	1.796	4.65	931.0/sq mi (359.4/km^{2})
Ridgeway	Town	Council (weak mayor)	Fairfield	266	319	−16.6%	0.485	1.26	548.5/sq mi (211.8/km^{2})
Rock Hill	City	Council–manager	York	74,372	66,154	+12.4%	39.796	103.07	1,868.8/sq mi (721.6/km^{2})
Rockville	Town	Mayor–council	Charleston	141	134	+5.2%	0.424	1.10	332.5/sq mi (128.4/km^{2})
Rowesville	Town	Mayor–council	Orangeburg	253	304	−16.8%	0.834	2.16	303.4/sq mi (117.1/km^{2})
Ruby	Town	Mayor–council	Chesterfield	307	360	−14.7%	2.469	6.39	124.3/sq mi (48.0/km^{2})
St. George†	Town	Council (weak mayor)	Dorchester	1,843	2,084	−11.6%	2.846	7.37	647.6/sq mi (250.0/km^{2})
St. Matthews†	Town	Council (weak mayor)	Calhoun	1,841	2,021	−8.9%	1.922	4.98	957.9/sq mi (369.8/km^{2})
St. Stephen	Town	Mayor–council	Berkeley	1,571	1,697	−7.4%	2.419	6.27	649.4/sq mi (250.8/km^{2})
Salem	Town	Council (weak mayor)	Oconee	120	135	−11.1%	0.915	2.37	131.1/sq mi (50.6/km^{2})
Salley	Town	Council (weak mayor)	Aiken	329	398	−17.3%	0.766	1.98	429.5/sq mi (165.8/km^{2})
Saluda†	Town	Mayor–council	Saluda	3,122	3,565	−12.4%	3.249	8.41	960.9/sq mi (371.0/km^{2})
Santee	Town	Mayor–council	Orangeburg	797	961	−17.1%	2.1	5.4	379.5/sq mi (146.5/km^{2})
Scotia	Town	Mayor–council	Hampton	158	215	−26.5%	3.165	8.20	49.9/sq mi (19.3/km^{2})
Scranton	Town	Mayor–council	Florence	648	932	−30.5%	0.792	2.05	818.2/sq mi (315.9/km^{2})
Seabrook Island	Town	Mayor–council	Charleston	2,050	1,714	+19.6%	5.938	15.38	345.2/sq mi (133.3/km^{2})
Sellers	Town	Mayor–council	Marion	147	219	−32.9%	0.669	1.73	219.7/sq mi (84.8/km^{2})
Seneca	City	Mayor–council	Oconee	8,850	8,102	+9.2%	8.195	21.22	1,079.9/sq mi (417.0/km^{2})
Sharon	Town	Mayor–council	York	462	494	−6.5%	1.31	3.4	352.7/sq mi (136.2/km^{2})
Silverstreet	Town	Mayor–council	Newberry	164	162	+1.2%	3.348	8.67	49.0/sq mi (18.9/km^{2})
Simpsonville	City	Council (weak mayor)	Greenville	23,354	18,238	+28.1%	9.38	24.3	2,489.8/sq mi (961.3/km^{2})
Six Mile	Town	Council (weak mayor)	Pickens	759	675	+12.4%	2.038	5.28	372.4/sq mi (143.8/km^{2})
Smoaks	Town	Council (weak mayor)	Colleton	98	126	−22.2%	1.63	4.2	60.1/sq mi (23.2/km^{2})
Smyrna	Town	Mayor–council	York; Cherokee	55	45	+22.2%	0.706	1.83	77.9/sq mi (30.1/km^{2})
Snelling	Town	Mayor–council	Barnwell	250	274	−8.8%	4.036	10.45	61.9/sq mi (23.9/km^{2})
Society Hill	Town	Mayor–council	Darlington	438	563	−22.2%	2.192	5.68	199.8/sq mi (77.1/km^{2})
South Congaree	Town	Council (weak mayor)	Lexington	2,377	2,306	+3.1%	3.288	8.52	722.9/sq mi (279.1/km^{2})
Spartanburg†	City	Council–manager	Spartanburg	38,732	37,013	+4.6%	20.253	52.46	1,912.4/sq mi (738.4/km^{2})
Springdale	Town	Council (weak mayor)	Lexington	2,744	2,636	+4.1%	2.704	7.00	1,014.8/sq mi (391.8/km^{2})
Springfield	Town	Mayor–council	Orangeburg	455	524	−13.2%	1.739	4.50	261.6/sq mi (101.0/km^{2})
Starr	Town	Mayor–council	Anderson	165	173	−4.6%	1.498	3.88	110.1/sq mi (42.5/km^{2})
Stuckey	Town	Council (weak mayor)	Williamsburg	200	245	−18.4%	0.935	2.42	213.9/sq mi (82.6/km^{2})
Sullivan's Island	Town	Council (weak mayor)	Charleston	1,891	1,791	+5.6%	2.498	6.47	757.0/sq mi (292.3/km^{2})
Summerton	Town	Council (weak mayor)	Clarendon	814	1,000	−18.6%	1.354	3.51	601.2/sq mi (232.1/km^{2})
Summerville	Town	Council (weak mayor)	Dorchester; Berkeley; Charleston	50,915	43,392	+17.3%	21.646	56.06	2,352.2/sq mi (908.2/km^{2})
Summit	Town	Mayor–council	Lexington	423	402	+5.2%	1.489	3.86	284.1/sq mi (109.7/km^{2})
Sumter†	City	Council–manager	Sumter	43,463	40,524	+7.3%	32.794	84.94	1,325.3/sq mi (511.7/km^{2})
Surfside Beach	Town	Council (weak mayor)	Horry	4,155	3,837	+8.3%	1.948	5.05	2,133.0/sq mi (823.5/km^{2})
Swansea	Town	Council (weak mayor)	Lexington	722	827	−12.7%	2.087	5.41	346.0/sq mi (133.6/km^{2})
Sycamore	Town	Council (weak mayor)	Allendale	147	180	−18.3%	3.171	8.21	46.4/sq mi (17.9/km^{2})
Tatum	Town	Mayor–council	Marlboro	76	75	+1.3%	0.908	2.35	83.7/sq mi (32.3/km^{2})
Tega Cay	City	Council–manager	York	12,832	7,620	+68.4%	4.488	11.62	2,859.2/sq mi (1,103.9/km^{2})
Timmonsville	Town	Council (weak mayor)	Florence	2,099	2,320	−9.5%	2.777	7.19	755.9/sq mi (291.8/km^{2})
Travelers Rest	City	Council (weak mayor)	Greenville	7,788	4,576	+70.2%	6.232	16.14	1,249.7/sq mi (482.5/km^{2})
Trenton	Town	Mayor–council	Edgefield	200	196	+2.0%	1.261	3.27	158.6/sq mi (61.2/km^{2})
Troy	Town	Mayor–council	Greenwood	83	93	−10.8%	0.799	2.07	103.9/sq mi (40.1/km^{2})
Turbeville	Town	Council (weak mayor)	Clarendon	760	766	−0.8%	1.34	3.5	567.2/sq mi (219.0/km^{2})
Ulmer	Town	Council (weak mayor)	Allendale	65	88	−26.1%	2.739	7.09	23.7/sq mi (9.2/km^{2})
Union†	City	Mayor–council	Union	8,174	8,393	−2.6%	7.979	20.67	1,024.4/sq mi (395.5/km^{2})
Vance	Town	Mayor–council	Orangeburg	128	170	−24.7%	0.507	1.31	252.5/sq mi (97.5/km^{2})
Van Wyck (Note: The town incorporated in 2017 and is thus not represented in the 2010 census.)	Town	Mayor–council	Lancaster	848	—	—	10.034	25.99	84.5/sq mi (32.6/km^{2})
Varnville	Town	Council (weak mayor)	Hampton	1,669	2,162	−22.8%	3.832	9.92	435.5/sq mi (168.2/km^{2})
Wagener	Town	Council (weak mayor)	Aiken	631	797	−20.8%	1.34	3.5	470.9/sq mi (181.8/km^{2})
Walhalla†	City	Council (weak mayor)	Oconee	4,072	4,263	−4.5%	3.885	10.06	1,048.1/sq mi (404.7/km^{2})
Walterboro†	City	Council–manager	Colleton	5,544	5,398	+2.7%	6.844	17.73	810.1/sq mi (312.8/km^{2})
Ward	Town	Mayor–council	Saluda	119	91	+30.8%	0.776	2.01	153.4/sq mi (59.2/km^{2})
Ware Shoals	Town	Council (weak mayor)	Greenwood; Abbeville; Laurens	1,701	2,170	−21.6%	3.277	8.49	519.1/sq mi (200.4/km^{2})
Waterloo	Town	Mayor–council	Laurens	149	166	−10.2%	1.783	4.62	83.6/sq mi (32.3/km^{2})
Wellford	City	Mayor–council	Spartanburg	3,293	2,378	+38.5%	4.578	11.86	719.3/sq mi (277.7/km^{2})
West Columbia	City	Council (weak mayor)	Lexington	17,416	14,988	+16.2%	9.173	23.76	1,898.6/sq mi (733.1/km^{2})
Westminster	City	Council (weak mayor)	Oconee	2,353	2,418	−2.7%	3.446	8.93	682.8/sq mi (263.6/km^{2})
West Pelzer	Town	Mayor–council	Anderson	962	880	+9.3%	0.525	1.36	1,832.4/sq mi (707.5/km^{2})
West Union	Town	Council (weak mayor)	Oconee	374	291	+28.5%	0.793	2.05	471.6/sq mi (182.1/km^{2})
Whitmire	Town	Mayor–council	Newberry	1,390	1,441	−3.5%	1.238	3.21	1,122.8/sq mi (433.5/km^{2})
Williams	Town	Mayor–council	Colleton	98	117	−16.2%	0.847	2.19	115.7/sq mi (44.7/km^{2})
Williamston	Town	Mayor–council	Anderson	4,043	3,934	+2.8%	3.689	9.55	1,096.0/sq mi (423.2/km^{2})
Williston	Town	Council (weak mayor)	Barnwell	2,877	3,139	−8.3%	8.953	23.19	321.3/sq mi (124.1/km^{2})
Windsor	Town	Mayor–council	Aiken	115	121	−5.0%	0.874	2.26	131.6/sq mi (50.8/km^{2})
Winnsboro†	Town	Council–manager	Fairfield	3,215	3,550	−9.4%	3.228	8.36	996.0/sq mi (384.5/km^{2})
Woodford	Town	Mayor–council	Orangeburg	161	185	−13.0%	0.785	2.03	205.1/sq mi (79.2/km^{2})
Woodruff	City	Council–manager	Spartanburg	4,212	4,090	+3.0%	5.063	13.11	831.9/sq mi (321.2/km^{2})
Yemassee	Town	Council (weak mayor)	Beaufort; Hampton	1,080	1,027	+5.2%	8.106	20.99	133.2/sq mi (51.4/km^{2})
York†	City	Council–manager	York	8,503	7,736	+9.9%	8.48	22.0	1,002.7/sq mi (387.1/km^{2})
Total municipalities	—	—	—	1,885,391	1,635,791	+15.3%	1,874.156	4,854.04	1,006.0/sq mi (388.4/km^{2})
South Carolina	—	—	—	5,118,425	4,625,364	+10.7%	30,060.70	77,856.9	170.3/sq mi (65.7/km^{2})

== See also ==
- South Carolina census statistical areas
- List of counties in South Carolina
- List of census-designated places in South Carolina
- List of unincorporated communities in South Carolina
