= South Carolina Highway 39 =

State highway in South Carolina

South Carolina Highway 39

- Route of SC 39 highlighted in red

Route information
- Maintained by SCDOT
- Length: 100.889 mi (162.365 km)
- Existed: 1922–present

Major junctions
- South end: US 278 southwest of Williston
- US 78 in Williston; I-20 near Jones Crossroads; US 1 in Monetta; US 178 near Saluda; US 378 in Saluda
- North end: US 221 near Laurens

Location
- Country: United States
- State: South Carolina
- Counties: Barnwell, Orangeburg, Aiken, Saluda, Newberry, Laurens

Highway system
- South Carolina State Highway System; Interstate; US; State; Scenic
← SC 38	→ SC 41

South Carolina Highway 39 (SC 39) is a 100.889-mile (162.365 km) primary state highway in the U.S. state of South Carolina. The highway connects various rural communities and towns from the southwest to the northwest sections of the state.

== Route description ==
SC 39 is a two-lane rural highway that travels 100.7 miles (162.1 km) from the Savannah River Site to U.S. Route 221 (US 221) south of Laurens.

== History ==
Established in 1922 as an original state highway, traveling from SC 12, in Monetta, to SC 21, in Edgefield. In 1923, SC 39 was extended in both directions: west to SC 20, in Modoc, and southeast to SC 4, in Springfield. By 1926, it was extended south again to SC 27, in Williston. The first section of SC 39 to be paved was from Johnston to Edgefield, in 1930.

In 1936, SC 39 was rerouted at Ridge Spring north through Saluda and Cross Hill, before ending at US 221, south of Laurens; it replaced a majority of SC 392, while the old alignment became an extension of SC 23. By 1938, SC 39 was extended in both directions again: north to Ware Shoals then west to US 178, in Shoals Junction; and southwest from Williston to SC 64, in Dunbarton.

In 1940, SC 39 was extended south to SC 28/SC 282 (today's SC 125, near Millett. By 1942, SC 39 reached its apex with an extension into Millett, giving it a length of over 145 miles (233 km). By 1946, all of SC 39 was paved, with its last section between SC 391 and US 1.

In 1948, SC 39 was truncated at SC 64, in Dunbarton, leaving behind existing Furse Mill Road (S-30-17) and Rolling Hills Road (S-30-24). The section of SC 39 between US 221 and Ware Shoals was downgraded to secondary roads: Indian Mound Road (S-30-6) and Power House Road (S-30-47); this also created a gap as SC 39 was still between Ware Shoals and Shoals Junction. In 1951 or 1952, the discontinued length of SC 39 between Ware Shoals and Shoals Junction was renumbered as SC 420. Also, during the same period, SC 39 was truncated to its current southern terminus at the Savannah River Site boundary near a realigned routing of SC 28 (today's US 278); a majority of its former route now within the Savannah River Site still exists, though sections have been removed or submerged under Par Pond.

== Major intersections ==
County	Location	mi	km	Destinations	Notes
Barnwell		0.000	0.000	US 278 / Savannah Drive south – Barnwell, Augusta	Southern terminus; Savannah Drive continues past terminus.
Barnwell	Williston	4.966	7.992	US 78 west (Church Street) – Aiken, Augusta	Southern end of US 78 concurrency
Barnwell	Williston	5.219	8.399	US 78 east (Main Street) – Blackville, Charleston	Northern end of US 78 concurrency
Barnwell		13.309	21.419	SC 37 south – Elko, Barnwell	Northern terminus of SC 37
Orangeburg	Springfield	15.939	25.651	SC 4 west (Surrey Race Road) – Augusta	Southern end of SC 4 concurrency
Orangeburg	Springfield	16.029	25.796	SC 4 east (Springfield Road) – Neeses, Orangeburg	Northern end of SC 4 concurrency
Aiken	Salley	21.029	33.843	SC 394 (Walnut Street) – North, Orangeburg, Aiken	
Aiken	Perry	26.089	41.986	SC 389 east (Walker Street) – Orangeburg	Western terminus of SC 389
Aiken	Wagener	28.849	46.428	SC 113 / SC 302 (Main Street) – Columbia, Batesburg-Leesville, Aiken	
Aiken		41.118– 41.119	66.173– 66.175	I-20 – Columbia, Augusta	I-20 exit 33
Aiken	Jones Crossroads	42.349	68.154	SC 39 Conn. north to SC 391 – Batesburg	Southern terminus of SC 39 Conn.
Aiken	Jones Crossroads	42.429	68.283	SC 391 north (Wire Road) – Batesburg, Aiken	Southern terminus of SC 391
Aiken	Monetta	49.039	78.921	US 1 (Columbia Highway) – Aiken, Batesburg-Leesville	
Saluda	Monetta	49.779	80.112	SC 23 east – Batesburg-Leesville	Southern end of SC 23 concurrency
Saluda	Ridge Spring	50.629	81.479	SC 392 south (Green Street) – Aiken	Northern terminus of SC 392
Saluda	Ridge Spring	53.569	86.211	SC 23 west – Johnston	Northern end of SC 23 concurrency
Saluda		64.539	103.865	US 178 east – Batesburg-Leesville	Southern end of US 178 concurrency
Saluda	Saluda	66.009	106.231	SC 121 south (Main Street) – Johnston	Southern end of SC 121 concurrency
Saluda	Saluda	66.209	106.553	US 378 (Church Street) – Columbia, McCormick	
Saluda	Saluda	66.559	107.116	SC 121 north (North Main Street north) / Travis Avenue east (US 178 Conn. east) to US 378 / SC 194 east – Newberry, Columbia	Northern end of SC 121 concurrency; western terminus of US 178 Conn.
Saluda	Saluda	66.649	107.261	US 178 west (Greenwood Highway) – Greenwood	Northern end of US 178 concurrency
Saluda		70.429	113.344	SC 702 west – Ninety Six	Eastern terminus of SC 702; to Greenwood State Park
Newberry	Chappells	80.149	128.987	SC 34 – Ninety Six, Newberry	To Ninety Six National Historic Site
Newberry		81.979	131.932	SC 56 east – Clinton	Western terminus of SC 56
Laurens	Cross Hill	91.429	147.141	SC 560 east – Kinards	Western terminus of SC 560
Laurens	Cross Hill	92.419	148.734	SC 72 – Clinton, Greenwood	
Laurens		100.889	162.365	US 221 – Laurens, Waterloo, Greenwood, Abbeville	Northern terminus
1.000 mi = 1.609 km; 1.000 km = 0.621 mi: Concurrency terminus

== Jones Crossroads connector route ==
South Carolina Highway 39 Connector
- Location: Jones Crossroads
- Length: 0.160 mi (257 m)

South Carolina Highway 39 Connector (SC 39 Conn.) is a 0.160-mile-long (0.257 km) connector route that connects SC 39 and SC 391 in the eastern part of Jones Crossroads and the northern part of Aiken County. It is unsigned and is signed as SC 391 itself, instead.

It begins at an intersection with the SC 39 mainline (Old Ninety-Six Indian Trail). It travels to the north-northwest and curves to the north before it reaches its northern terminus, an intersection with SC 391 (Wire Road).
