= South Carolina Highway 389 =

State highway in South Carolina, United States

South Carolina Highway 389

Route information
- Maintained by SCDOT
- Length: 13.730 mi (22.096 km)

Major junctions
- West end: SC 39 in Perry
- SC 3 near Salley
- East end: US 321 in Neeses

Location
- Country: United States
- State: South Carolina
- Counties: Orangeburg, Aiken

Highway system
- South Carolina State Highway System; Interstate; US; State; Scenic
← SC 385	→ SC 391

South Carolina Highway 389 (SC 389) is a 13.730-mile-long (22.096 km) state highway in the U.S. state of South Carolina. The highway connects Neeses and Perry.

== Route description ==
SC 389 begins at an intersection with SC 39 (West Railroad Avenue/Festival Trail Road) in Perry, within Aiken County. It travels to the southeast, enters Orangeburg County, and intersects SC 394 (Salley Road) at a point northeast of Salley. Less than one mile (1.6 km) later, it intersects SC 3 (Capital Way). The highway continues to the southeast and enters the city limits of Neeses. It curves to the east-northeast and crosses over railroad tracks before meeting its eastern terminus, an intersection with U.S. Route 321 (US 321; Savannah Highway). Here, the roadway continues as Ninety Six Road.

== Major intersections ==
County	Location	mi	km	Destinations	Notes
Aiken	Perry	0.0	0.0	SC 39 (West Railroad Avenue/Festival Trail Road) – Springfield, Monetta	
Orangeburg		5.2	8.4	SC 394 (Salley Road) – Salley, North	
Orangeburg		6.0	9.7	SC 3 (Capital Way) – Springfield, Swansea	
Orangeburg	Neeses	13.6	21.9	US 321 (Savannah Highway) – Norway, Orangeburg, Livingston	
1.000 mi = 1.609 km; 1.000 km = 0.621 mi
