= South Carolina Highway 113 =

State highway in South Carolina, United States

South Carolina Highway 113

Route information
- Maintained by SCDOT
- Length: 13.610 mi (21.903 km)
- Existed: 1949–present

Major junctions
- South end: SC 394 west of Salley
- North end: US 178 west of Pelion

Location
- Country: United States
- State: South Carolina
- Counties: Aiken, Lexington

Highway system
- South Carolina State Highway System; Interstate; US; State; Scenic
← SC 110	→ SC 114

South Carolina Highway 113 (SC 113) is a 13.610-mile-long (21.903 km) state highway in the U.S. state of South Carolina. The highway connects rural areas of Aiken and Lexington counties with Wagener.

== Route description ==
SC 113 begins at an intersection with SC 394 (Salley Road) west of Salley, within Aiken County, where the roadway continues as South Dixie Road. It travels to the north-northwest and immediately curves to the north-northeast before crossing over Dean Swamp Creek. SC 113 curves back to the north-northwest. It heads north just before entering Wagener. It passes Wagener–Salley High School. It curves to the north-northeast and begins a concurrency with SC 302 (Aiken Road). The concurrency intersects SC 39 (Railroad Street). Just over 1,000 feet (300 m) later, SC 113 and SC 302 split, with SC 113 heading to the north-northwest. The highway passes Cyril B. Busbee Elementary School and A.L. Corbett Middle School just before leaving town. It curves to the north-northeast. It curves back to the north-northwest and crosses the North Edisto River, where it enters Lexington County. The highway curves to the north-northeast and meets its northern terminus, an intersection with U.S. Route 178 (US 178; Fairview Road). Here, the roadway continues as Calks Ferry Road.

== Major intersections ==
County	Location	mi	km	Destinations	Notes
Aiken		0.000	0.000	SC 394 (Salley Road) – Aiken, Salley, Perry	Southern terminus
Aiken	Wagener	5.810	9.350	SC 302 west (Aiken Road) – Aiken, Augusta	Southern end of SC 302 concurrency
Aiken	Wagener	5.940	9.560	SC 39 (Railroad Street) to I-20 – Orangeburg, Monetta	
Aiken	Wagener	6.170	9.930	SC 302 east (Columbia Road) – Columbia	Northern end of SC 302 concurrency
Lexington		13.610	21.903	US 178 (Fairview Road) – Seneca	Northern terminus
1.000 mi = 1.609 km; 1.000 km = 0.621 mi: Concurrency terminus
