= Augusta metropolitan area =

Metropolitan statistical area in Georgia, US

- Metropolitan statistical area
- Augusta-Richmond County, GA–SC metropolitan statistical area
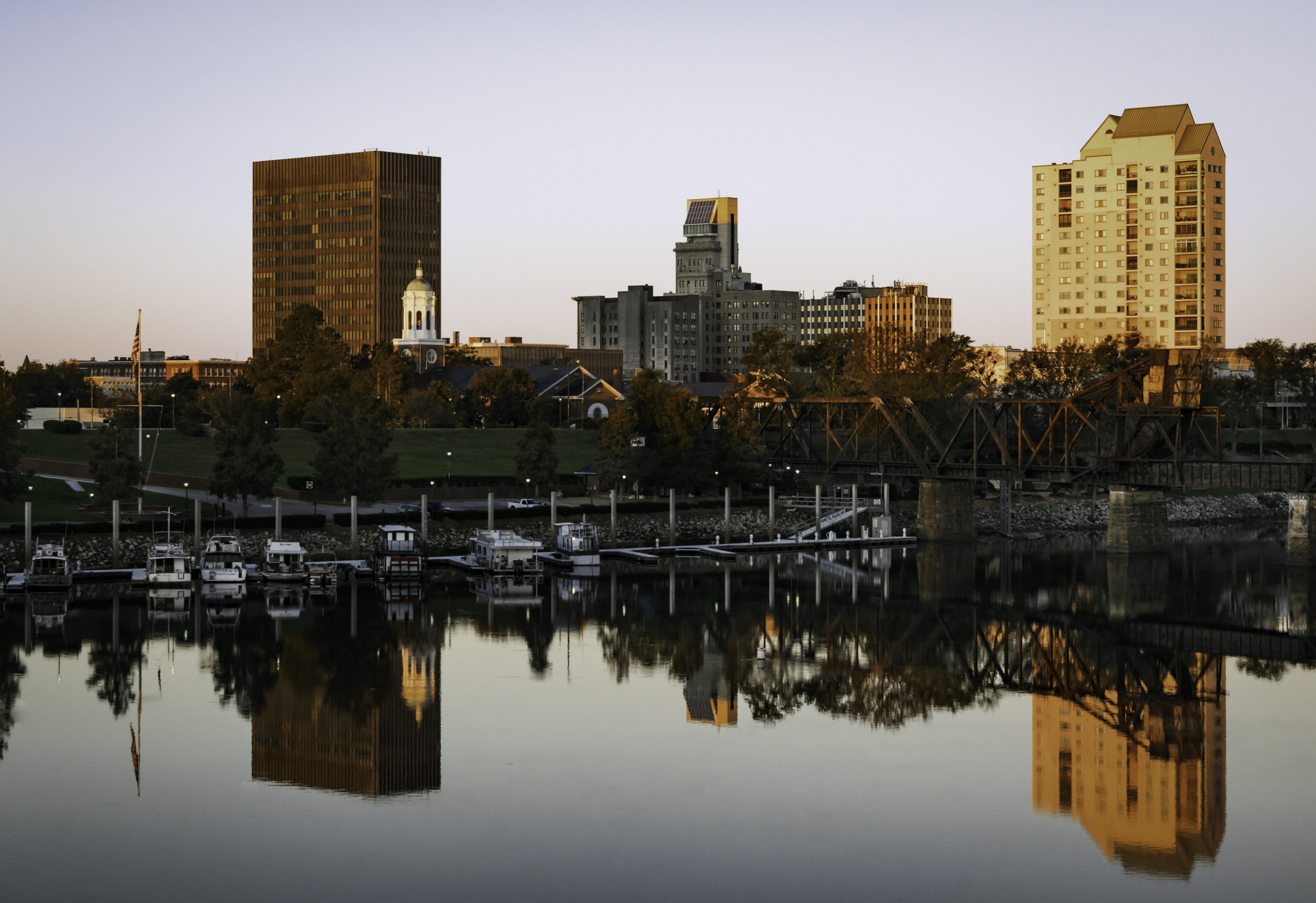
- Downtown Augusta
Map of Augusta-Richmond County, GA–SC MSA
Augusta–Richmond County
City of Aiken
Augusta, GA–SC MSA
- Country: United States
- State: Georgia; South Carolina
- Largest city: Augusta
- Other cities: Aiken

Area
  - Total: 4,045 sq mi (10,480 km^{2})
  - Land: 3,932 sq mi (10,180 km^{2})
  - Water: 113 sq mi (290 km^{2}) 2.8%

Population (2020)
  - Total: 611,000
  - Estimate (2025): 641,231
  - Density: 155/sq mi (60.0/km^{2})
  - Rank: 92nd

GDP
  - Total: $34.185 billion (2022)
- Time zone: UTC-5 (EST)
  - Summer (DST): UTC-4 (EDT)
- Area codes: 478, 706, 762, 803, 839, 864, 821

The Augusta metropolitan area, officially the Augusta-Richmond County, GA–SC Metropolitan Statistical Area according to the U.S. Office of Management and Budget, Census Bureau and other agencies, is a metropolitan statistical area centered on the city of Augusta, Georgia. It straddles two U.S. states, Georgia and South Carolina, and includes the Georgia counties of Richmond, Burke, Columbia, Lincoln, and McDuffie as well as the South Carolina counties of Aiken and Edgefield. The official 2025 U.S. census estimate for the area was 641,231 residents, up from 611,000 at the 2020 U.S. census.

== Geography ==
The Augusta metropolitan area consists of seven counties: five in Georgia, and two in South Carolina. Among the counties making up the metropolitan region, Richmond, Aiken, and Columbia were its most populous.

County	State	Seat	2025 estimate	2020 census	Change	Area	Density
Richmond	Georgia	Augusta	206,559	206,607	−0.02%	329 sq mi (850 km^{2})	628/sq mi (242/km^{2})
Aiken	South Carolina	Aiken	181,515	168,808	+7.53%	1,080 sq mi (2,800 km^{2})	168/sq mi (65/km^{2})
Columbia	Georgia	Appling	169,189	156,010	+8.45%	308 sq mi (800 km^{2})	549/sq mi (212/km^{2})
Edgefield	South Carolina	Edgefield	29,808	25,657	+16.18%	507 sq mi (1,310 km^{2})	59/sq mi (23/km^{2})
Burke	Georgia	Waynesboro	24,408	24,596	−0.76%	835 sq mi (2,160 km^{2})	29/sq mi (11/km^{2})
McDuffie	Georgia	Thomson	21,640	21,632	+0.04%	266 sq mi (690 km^{2})	81/sq mi (31/km^{2})
Lincoln	Georgia	Lincolnton	8,112	7,690	+5.49%	257 sq mi (670 km^{2})	32/sq mi (12/km^{2})
Total			641,231	611,000	+4.95%	3,582 sq mi (9,280 km^{2})	179/sq mi (69/km^{2})

=== Communities ===
==== Places with more than 100,000 inhabitants ====
- Augusta-Richmond County (balance), Georgia (principal city) Pop: 197,872

==== Places with 10,000 to 40,000 inhabitants ====
- Martinez, Georgia Pop: 35,795
- Aiken, South Carolina Pop: 29,884
- Evans, Georgia Pop: 29,011
- North Augusta, South Carolina Pop: 21,873
- Grovetown, Georgia Pop: 14,473

==== Places with 5,000 to 10,000 inhabitants ====
- Thomson, Georgia Pop: 6,718
- Belvedere, South Carolina Pop: 5,792
- Waynesboro, Georgia Pop: 5,816

==== Places with 1,000 to 5,000 inhabitants ====
- Edgefield, South Carolina Pop: 4,690
- Barnwell, South Carolina Pop: 4,500
- Clearwater, South Carolina Pop: 4,370
- Hephzibah, Georgia Pop: 4,021
- Gloverville, South Carolina Pop: 2,831
- Burnettown, South Carolina Pop: 2,673
- Harlem, Georgia Pop: 2,779
- Johnston, South Carolina Pop: 2,362
- New Ellenton, South Carolina Pop: 2,052
- Jackson, South Carolina Pop: 1,700
- Lincolnton, Georgia Pop: 1,520

==== Places with fewer than 1,000 inhabitants ====
- Sardis, Georgia Pop: 995
- Wagener, South Carolina Pop: 631
- Blythe, Georgia Pop: 744
- Dearing, Georgia Pop: 529
- Salley, South Carolina Pop: 329
- Keysville, Georgia (partial) Pop: 300
- Midville, Georgia Pop: 385
- Monetta, South Carolina (partial) Pop: 205
- Perry, South Carolina Pop: 194
- Trenton, South Carolina Pop: 200
- Girard, Georgia Pop: 184
- Windsor, South Carolina Pop: 115
- Vidette, Georgia Pop: 103

== Demographics ==
According to the 2000 United States census, there were 499,684 people, 184,801 households, and 132,165 families residing within the MSA. By the 2020 census, its population was 611,000, with a 2025 census-estimated metropolitan population of 641,231.

In 2000, the racial and ethnic composition of the Augusta metropolitan area was 60.81% White American, 35.09% Black or African American, 0.32% Native American, 1.42% Asian American, 0.08% Pacific Islander, 0.85% from other races, and 1.43% from two or more races. Hispanic and Latino Americans of any race were 2.40% of the population. According to the 2022 American Community Survey, its racial and ethnic makeup was 52% White, 34% African American, 2% Asian, 1% other, 4% multiracial, and 6% Hispanic or Latino of any race.

In 2000, the median income for a household in the MSA was $36,933, and the median income for a family was $42,869. Males had a median income of $34,574 versus $22,791 for females. The per capita income for the MSA was $17,652. In 2022, the estimated median household income was $64,851 with a per capita income of $34,401. Of its population, 40% earned less than $50,000 annually; 29% earned from $50,000 to $100,000 annually; 23% $100,000 to $200,000; and 8% earned more than $200,000 annually. Among the metropolitan population, approximately 15% lived at or below the poverty line.

=== Religion ===
In terms of religious adherence and observance, Christianity is the MSA's largest religion. Located within the Bible Belt, Christians became the largest religious group during British colonization of the Americas and the establishment of the Province of Georgia. Before European exploration and colonization of the Americas, Native American religions were predominant in the present-day metropolitan area.

According to a 2020 study by the Association of Religion Data Archives, the largest overall Christian groups were Baptists, non-denominational Protestants, and Catholics; and the largest Christian denominations were the Southern Baptist Convention, the Catholic Church, United Methodist Church, and the National Baptist Convention, USA and National Missionary Baptist Convention. Prominent non-mainstream Christian denominations were the Church of Jesus Christ of Latter-day Saints, and the Jehovah's Witnesses.

In the same 2020 Association of Religion Data Archives study, Hinduism is the Augusta metropolitan area's second-largest religion, followed by Islam, Buddhism, Judaism, the Baha'i Faith, Sikhism, and Jainism. Among its metropolitan Jewish community, the largest Jewish denominations or movements were Conservative Judaism, Reform Judaism, Orthodox Judaism, and Chabad.

== Economy ==
The largest metropolitan industries are medicine, biotechnology, cyber security, manufacturing, and education. Prominent employers and organizations throughout the region have been Augusta University, Augusta Technical College, Paine College, East Georgia State College and Georgia Military College, the Richmond County School System, Savannah River Site, Encompass Health Corporation, T-Mobile, Teleperformance, and Coca-Cola. Among the colleges and universities, Augusta University has made an economic impact of $2.24 billion and more than 21,000 jobs to the state's economy as of 2022.

== Transportation ==
=== Airports ===
- Augusta Regional Airport
- Daniel Field
- Aiken Regional Airport

=== Major highways ===
==== Mainline Interstate and U.S. Highways ====
- I-20
  - I-520
- US 1
- US 25
- US 78
  - US 278
  - US 378
- US 221

==== Mainline state highways ====
- SC 3
- SC 5
- SR 10
- SR 12
- SR 17
- SC 19
- SR 24
- SR 28
- SC 34
- SC 39
- SR 43
- SR 44
- SR 47
- SR 56
- SC 73
- SR 78
- SR 79
- SR 80
- SR 88
- SR 104
- SC 125
- SC 125
- SR 150
- SC 191
- SR 220
- SR 223
- SC 230
- SR 232
- SC 302
- SR 305
- SR 383
- SR 388
- SC 394
- SR 402 – SR 402 is the unsigned designation for I-20 in Georgia
- SR 415 – SR 402 is the unsigned designation for I-520 in Georgia
- SC 430
- SR 540
- SR 555 / SR 565 – SR 565 and SR 665 are the unsigned designations for the Savannah River Parkway

==== Special routes ====
- US 1 Truck (Aiken, SC)
- US 25 Byp. (Burke Veterans Parkway, GA)
- US 25 Bus. (Augusta, GA–North Augusta, SC)
- US 25 Conn. (North Augusta, SC)
- US 25 Truck (Edgefield, SC)
- US 78 Truck (Aiken, SC)
- SC 4 Truck (Aiken, SC–Kitchings Mill, SC)
- SR 17 Byp. (Thomson, GA)
- SC 19 Conn. (Aiken, SC)
- SC 19 Truck (Aiken, SC)
- SC 19 Conn. (Trenton, SC)
- SC 23 Truck (Edgefield, SC)
- SC 39 Conn. (Jones Crossroads, SC)
- SR 43 Conn. (Lincolnton, GA)
- SR 56 Spur (Burke County, GA)
- SR 104 Conn. (Augusta, GA)
- SC 125 Conn. (North Augusta, SC)
- SC 125 Truck (North Augusta, SC)
- SC 430 Conn. (Edgefield, SC)

== See also ==
- Georgia census statistical areas
- South Carolina census statistical areas
