= South Carolina Highway 394 =

State highway in South Carolina, United States

South Carolina Highway 394

Route information
- Maintained by SCDOT
- Length: 22.370 mi (36.001 km)

Major junctions
- West end: SC 4 near Windsor
- SC 3 near Perry
- East end: US 178 near North

Location
- Country: United States
- State: South Carolina
- Counties: Aiken, Orangeburg

Highway system
- South Carolina State Highway System; Interstate; US; State; Scenic
← SC 392	→ SC 395

South Carolina Highway 394 (SC 394) is a 22.370-mile-long (36.001 km) state highway in the U.S. state of South Carolina. The highway connects rural areas of Aiken and Orangeburg counties with North, via Salley.

== Route description ==
SC 394 begins at an intersection with SC 4 (Surrey Race Road) north-northeast of Windsor, within Aiken County. This intersection is north-northeast of Aiken State Park. It travels to the east and intersects the southern terminus of SC 113 (Dixie Road). It crosses over Dean Swamp Creek before it enters the city limits of Salley. In the town, the highway has an intersection with SC 39 (Railroad Avenue). After it leaves Salley, it enters Orangeburg County just before it crosses over Goodland Creek. The highway curves to the northeast and intersects SC 389 (Ninety-Six Road). It then begins heading to the east again before an intersection with SC 3 (Capital Way/Whetstone Road). The highway curves to the northeast and crosses the North Fork Edisto River and Penn Branch before it meets its eastern terminus, an intersection with U.S. Route 178 (US 178; North Road), just west of North. Here, the roadway continues as Salley Road.

== Major intersections ==
County	Location	mi	km	Destinations	Notes
Aiken		0.000	0.000	SC 4 (Surrey Race Road) – Aiken, Fairfield	Western terminus
Aiken		6.990	11.249	SC 113 north (Dixie Road) – Wagener	Southern terminus of SC 113
Aiken	Salley	9.490	15.273	SC 39 (Railroad Avenue) – Springfield, Wagener	
Orangeburg		14.030	22.579	SC 389 (Ninety-Six Road) – Perry, Saluda, Neeses, Orangeburg	
Orangeburg		15.183	24.435	SC 3 (Capital Way / Whetstone Road) – Springfield, Barnwell, Swansea, Columbia	
Orangeburg		22.370	36.001	US 178 (North Road) – North, Orangeburg, Batesburg	Eastern terminus
1.000 mi = 1.609 km; 1.000 km = 0.621 mi
