= South Carolina Highway 391 =

State highway in South Carolina, United States

South Carolina Highway 391

Route information
- Maintained by SCDOT
- Length: 34.920 mi (56.198 km)

Major junctions
- South end: SC 39 near New Holland
- US 178 in Batesburg-Leesville; US 1 in Batesburg-Leesville; US 378 near Delmar
- North end: US 76 in Prosperity

Location
- Country: United States
- State: South Carolina
- Counties: Aiken, Lexington, Saluda, Newberry

Highway system
- South Carolina State Highway System; Interstate; US; State; Scenic
← SC 389	→ SC 392

South Carolina Highway 391 (SC 391) is a 34.920-mile-long (56.198 km) state highway in the U.S. state of South Carolina. The highway connects rural areas of Aiken County with Prosperity, via Batesburg-Leesville.

== Route description ==
SC 391 begins at an intersection with SC 39 (Old Ninety-Six Indian Trail) northwest of New Holland, Aiken County, where the roadway continues as Wire Road. It travels to the north-northeast. It passes Neeses Pond and crosses Chinquapin Creek, where it enters Lexington County, before it curves to the northwest. The highway crosses over Mare Branch. After it curves to the north, it crosses over Horsepen Creek and passes by Indian Trail Golf Course. Just before entering the city limits of Batesburg-Leesville, the highway passes by Davis Pond and crosses over Duncan Creek. In the city, it intersects U.S. Route 178 (US 178; South Pine Street). The two highways travel concurrently to the northwest. At West Columbia Avenue, they intersect US 1. At West Church Street, they meet SC 23. Here, US 178 splits off, while SC 391 continues to the northwest and immediately begins to curve to the north-northeast. Just before intersecting Marion Street, it begins to curve to the east-northeast. Before leaving the city limits, the highway passes Ridge Crest Memorial Park, curves to the north-northwest, and passes the Batesburg-Leesville Branch Library, Batesburg-Leesville High School, and Batesburg-Leesville Primary School. The highway curves to the north-northeast and crosses over Gin Branch before intersecting the northern terminus of SC 245 (North Lee Street). It crosses over Lick Creek and then enters Saluda County. Just before entering Delmar, SC 391 begins curving to the northwest. Then, it intersects US 378 (Columbia Highway) at a roundabout known as the Saluda Traffic Circle. A short distance later, the highway starts heading to the north and crosses over the Little Saluda River. It intersects the northern terminus of SC 194 (Denny Highway) just before crossing over the Saluda River on the Noah L. Black Bridge into Newberry County. SC 391 begins traveling to the northeast and north before entering Prosperity. As soon as it enters the town, it passes by Prosperity Cemetery. It curves to the north-northwest. Just before McNeary Street, it crosses over railroad tracks and curves to the northwest. At Main Street, it turns left and travels to the northwest. Just before it meets its northern terminus, an intersection with US 76 (C.R. Koon Highway), it crosses over some railroad tracks and passes by the W.L. Mills MD Fitness Park.

== Major intersections ==
County	Location	mi	km	Destinations	Notes
Aiken	Jones Crossroads	0.000	0.000	SC 39 (Old Ninety-Six Indian Trail) – Wagener, Monetta	Southern terminus
Aiken	Jones Crossroads	0.090	0.145	SC 39 Conn. south	Northern terminus of SC 39 Conn.
Lexington	Batesburg-Leesville	10.030	16.142	US 178 east (South Pine Street) – Orangeburg	Southern end of US 178 concurrency
Lexington	Batesburg-Leesville	10.420	16.769	US 1 (West Columbia Avenue) – Aiken, Columbia	
Lexington	Batesburg-Leesville	10.690	17.204	US 178 west / SC 23 (West Church Street) – Saluda, Columbia	Northern end of US 178 concurrency
Lexington		13.500	21.726	SC 245 south (North Lee Street)	Northern terminus of SC 245
Saluda		21.360– 21.370	34.376– 34.392	US 378 – Saluda, Columbia	Roundabout; Saluda Traffic Circle
Saluda		25.170	40.507	SC 194 south – Saluda	Northern terminus of SC 194
Newberry	Prosperity	34.920	56.198	US 76 (C.R. Koon Highway) – Newberry, Columbia	Northern terminus
1.000 mi = 1.609 km; 1.000 km = 0.621 mi: Concurrency terminus
