= South Carolina Highway 23 =

State highway in South Carolina

South Carolina Highway 23

Route information
- Maintained by SCDOT
- Length: 47.050 mi (75.720 km)
- Existed: 1929–present
- Tourist routes: SC Heritage Corridor: Discovery Route

Major junctions
- West end: US 221 / SC 28 in Modoc
- US 25 in Edgefield; US 178 in Batesburg-Leesville
- East end: US 1 in Batesburg-Leesville

Location
- Country: United States
- State: South Carolina
- Counties: McCormick, Edgefield, Saluda, Lexington

Highway system
- South Carolina State Highway System; Interstate; US; State; Scenic
← SC 22	→ SC 24

South Carolina Highway 23 (SC 23) is a 47.060-mile (75.736 km) primary state highway in the U.S. state of South Carolina. It serves to connect Edgefield and Batesburg-Leesville with Columbia via U.S. Route 1 (US 1).

== Route description ==
SC 23 is a two-lane rural highway that travels from Modoc, within the Sumter National Forest and near Lake Strom Thurmond, to Batesburg-Leesville. The highway travels through mostly either forest or farmland, while connecting with the city and towns of Edgefield, Johnston, Ward, Ridge Spring and Monetta. Between Monetta and Batesburg-Leesville, SC 23 parallels to the north of US 1.

== History ==
The first SC 23 was an original state highway that traveled from SC 3 in Pee Dee, through Latta and Dillon, becoming NC 22 at the North Carolina state line near Rowland. In 1927, US 217 was assigned on the entire route; after a year, SC 23 was decommissioned.

The second, and current, SC 23 was established around 1929, traveling from SC 39 in Monetta to US 1 in Leesville. In 1936, SC 23 was extended west to its current western terminus in Modoc, replacing part of SC 39.

== Major intersections ==
County	Location	mi	km	Destinations	Notes
McCormick	Modoc	0.000	0.000	US 221 / SC 28 – McCormick, Clarks Hill, Augusta	Western terminus
Edgefield	West Store Crossroads	9.620	15.482	SC 230 south (Martintown Road) – North Augusta	Northern terminus of SC 230
Edgefield	Edgefield	17.190	27.665	US 25 Truck / SC 23 Truck (Bauskett Street / US 25) – Augusta	Southern terminus of SC 23 Truck; US 25 Truck is actually the US 25 mainline.
Edgefield	Edgefield	18.090	29.113	US 25 north (Buncombe Street / US 25 Bus. north) – Greenwood	Western end of US 25/US 25 Bus. concurrency; US 25 is actually US 25 Bus.
Edgefield	Edgefield	18.540	29.837	US 25 south (Augusta Road / US 25 Bus. south) – Aiken, Augusta	Eastern end of US 25/US 25 Bus. concurrency; US 25 is actually US 25 Bus.
Edgefield		20.470	32.943	SC 23 Truck south / SC 430 north (Crest Road) – Greenwood	Northern terminus of SC 23; southern terminus of SC 430
Edgefield	Johnston	26.370	42.438	SC 121 (Lee Street) – Aiken, Augusta, Saluda	
Saluda	Ward	30.810	49.584	SC 193 north (Ward Avenue) – Saluda	Southern terminus of SC 193
Saluda	Ridge Spring	34.240	55.104	SC 39 north (Ridge Spring Highway) – Saluda	Western end of SC 39 concurrency
Saluda	Ridge Spring	35.090	56.472	SC 392 south (Green Street) – Aiken	Northern terminus of SC 392
Saluda	Monetta	38.030	61.203	SC 39 south (Main Street) – Monetta	Eastern end of SC 39 concurrency
Lexington	Batesburg-Leesville	43.570	70.119	US 178 west (Saluda Avenue) – Saluda	Western end of US 178 concurrency
Lexington	Batesburg-Leesville	43.680	70.296	US 178 east / SC 391 (Pine Street / Line Street) – Orangeburg, Newberry	Eastern end of US 178 concurrency
Lexington	Batesburg-Leesville	45.720	73.579	SC 245 (Lee Street) – Orangeburg, Newberry	
Lexington	Batesburg-Leesville	47.050	75.720	US 1 (Augusta Road) – Aiken, Lexington, Columbia	Eastern terminus
1.000 mi = 1.609 km; 1.000 km = 0.621 mi: Concurrency terminus

== Edgefield truck route ==
South Carolina Highway 23 Truck
- Location: Edgefield
- Length: 4.950 mi (7.966 km)

South Carolina Highway 23 Truck (SC 23 Truck) is a truck route that is partially within the western and northeastern parts of Edgefield. It has concurrencies with U.S. Route 25 Truck (US 25 Truck; actually the US 25 mainline signed as a truck route), US 25 Bus., SC 430 Conn., and SC 430. Unlike some truck routes, it is well marked along its path.

The truck route begins at an intersection with the SC 23 mainline. Here, the truck route travels to the north-northwest, concurrent with US 25 Truck (US 25). They curve to the north-northeast and cross over Beaverdam Creek. They curve back to the north-northwest and leave the city limits of Edgefield. They curve back to the north-northeast. At an intersection with US 25 and US 25 Bus., SC 23 Truck turns right onto the business route. The two highways travel to the southeast. At an intersection with Crest Road, SC 23 Truck splits off to the southeast, concurrent with the unsigned SC 430 Conn., while US 25 Bus. bends to the south-southeast. Then, they re-enter Edgefield. One block later, the two highways intersect Meeting Street, the northbound lanes of which is SC 430 north; the southbound lanes lead to US 25 Bus. south. At this intersection, SC 430 Conn. ends, and SC 23 Truck begins a concurrency with SC 430. The two highways take Crest Road to the southeast. They curve to the east-southeast and leave Edgefield again. They curve to the southeast and reach their terminus, an intersection with SC 23.

The entire route is in Edgefield County.

Location	mi	km	Destinations	Notes
Edgefield	0.000	0.000	US 25 Truck south (US 25 south) / SC 23 – Augusta, Clarks Hill, Piedmont Technical College Edgefield County Center	Southern end of US 25 Truck (US 25) concurrency; southern terminus; US 25 Truck south (US 25 south) leads to Edgefield County Hospital.
	1.990	3.203	US 25 north / US 25 Bus. begins – Greenwood	Northern end of US 25 Truck (US 25) concurrency; southern end of US 25 Bus. concurrency; northern terminus of US 25 Truck
	2.630	4.233	US 25 Bus. south / Crest Road begins / SC 430 Conn. begins – Edgefield	Northern end of US 25 Bus. concurrency; southern end of SC 430 Conn. concurrency; northern terminus of SC 430 Conn.
Edgefield	2.810	4.522	Meeting Street (SC 430 north) to US 25 Bus. south – Saluda, Edgefield	Northern end of SC 430 Conn. concurrency; southern end of SC 430 concurrency
	4.950	7.966	SC 23 – Edgefield, Johnston, Columbia	Northern end of SC 430 concurrency; northern terminus of SC 23 Truck; southern terminus of SC 430
1.000 mi = 1.609 km; 1.000 km = 0.621 mi: Concurrency terminus
