= South Carolina Highway 245 =

State highway in South Carolina, United States

South Carolina Highway 245

Route information
- Maintained by SCDOT
- Length: 5.060 mi (8.143 km)
- Existed: 1931–present

Major junctions
- South end: US 178 near Batesburg-Leesville
- US 1 in Batesburg-Leesville
- North end: SC 391 near Batesburg-Leesville

Location
- Country: United States
- State: South Carolina
- Counties: Lexington

Highway system
- South Carolina State Highway System; Interstate; US; State; Scenic
| ← SC 243 | → SC 246 |

South Carolina Highway 245 (SC 245) is a 5.060-mile-long (8.143 km) state highway in the U.S. state of South Carolina. The highway was built and paved in 1932 as a short spur of SC 24 passing north through Leesville to connect with SC 391. Since being built, that section of SC 24 was redesignated as US 178 in 1933, and Leesville merged in 1992 with Batesburg, where US 1 and SC 391 intersect, to form the town of Batesburg-Leesville. It is known locally as North Lee Street north of the railroad tracks, and as South Lee Street south of the railroad tracks. There are two traffic lights along SC 245.

== Major intersections ==
The entire route is in Lexington County.

| Location | mi | km | Destinations | Notes |
|---|---|---|---|---|
| | 0.000 | 0.000 | US 178 (Fairview Road) | Southern terminus |
| Batesburg-Leesville | 2.980 | 4.796 | US 1 (East Columbia Street) – Lexington, Batesburg | |
| Batesburg-Leesville | 3.100 | 4.989 | SC 23 (East Church Street) – Lexington, Ridge Spring | |
| | 5.060 | 8.143 | SC 391 (Summerland Avenue) – Newberry | |
1.000 mi = 1.609 km; 1.000 km = 0.621 mi
