= Salley Historic District =

Historic district in South Carolina, United States

- U.S. National Register of Historic Places
- U.S. Historic district
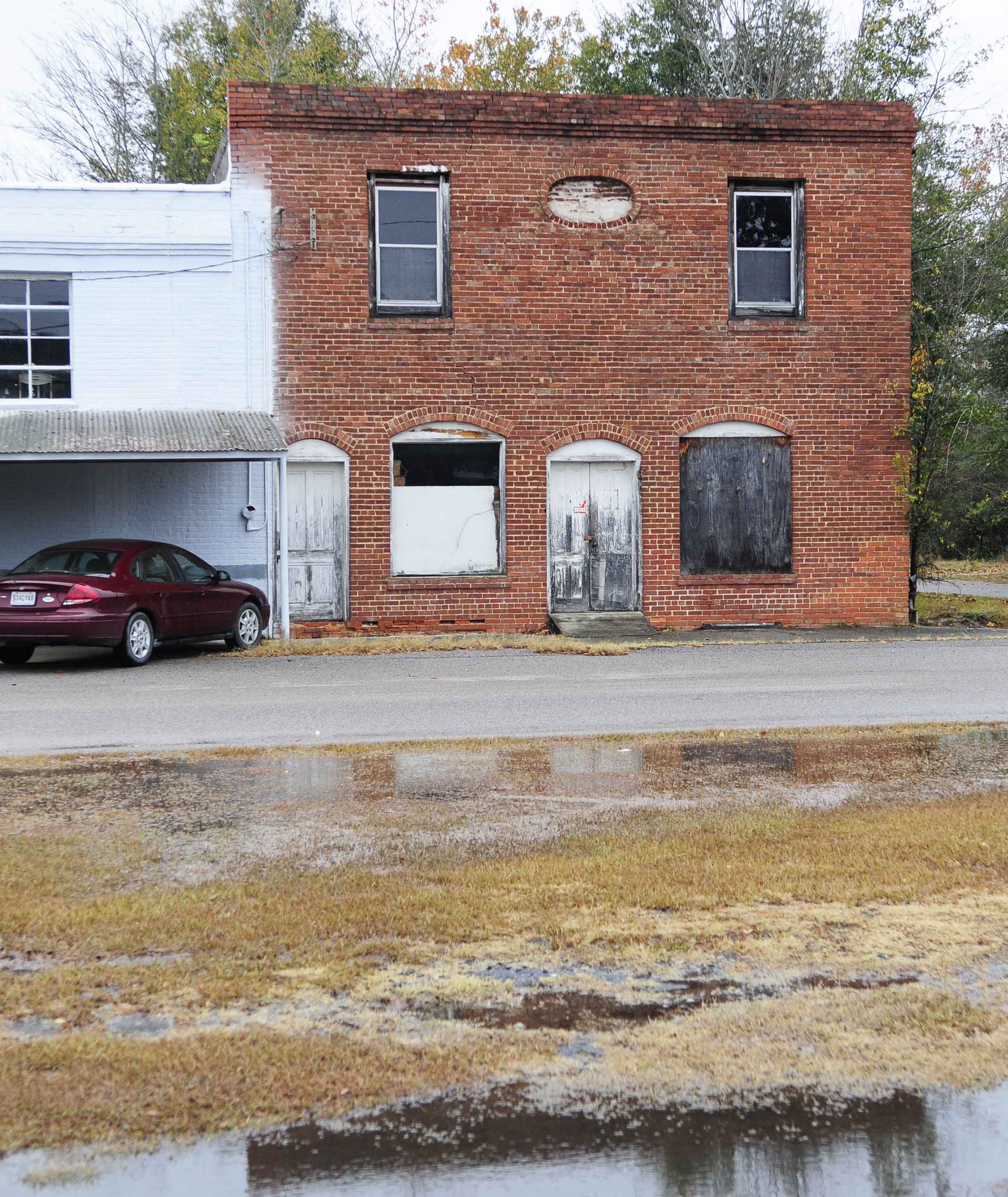

- Location within South Carolina Location within the United States
- Location: Bounded by Pine, Ferguson, Poplar, and Aldrich Sts., Salley, South Carolina
- Coordinates: 33°33′56″N 81°18′17″W
- Area: 76 acres (31 ha)
- Architectural style: Late Victorian, Bungalow/craftsman, et al.
- NRHP reference No.: 00000554
- Added to NRHP: October 27, 2000

The Salley Historic District, located in Salley, South Carolina, consists of 99 contributing structures and 51 non-contributing resources, and provides a good example of a South Carolina rural community during the late nineteenth and early twentieth centuries. The town, located in Aiken County, South Carolina and incorporated in 1887, is named after D. H. Salley, owner of a large nearby plantation who was instrumental in the area's original development. The Salley Historic District was listed on the National Register of Historic Places on October 27, 2000.
