= South Carolina Highway 193 =

State highway in Saluda County, South Carolina

South Carolina Highway 193

Route information
- Maintained by SCDOT
- Length: 6.930 mi (11.153 km)

Major junctions
- South end: SC 23 in Ward
- North end: SC 121 near Saluda

Location
- Country: United States
- State: South Carolina
- Counties: Saluda

Highway system
- South Carolina State Highway System; Interstate; US; State; Scenic
← SC 191	→ SC 194

South Carolina Highway 193 (SC 193) is a 6.930-mile-long (11.153 km) state highway in the U.S. state of South Carolina. The highway connects Ward and rural areas of Saluda County.

== Route description ==
SC 193 begins at an intersection with SC 23 (Front Street) in Ward, within Saluda County, where the roadway continues as Mt. Alpha Road. It travels to the north-northwest and leaves town. It crosses over Dry Creek. After it curves to the northwest, it crosses over Mine Creek and Little Mine Creek in quick succession. The highway passes Saluda County Airport just before meeting its northern terminus, an intersection with SC 121, south-southwest of Saluda, where the roadway continues as Gabe Road.

== Major intersections ==
The entire route is in Saluda County.

Location	mi	km	Destinations	Notes
Ward	0.000	0.000	SC 23 (Front Street) – Johnston, Ridge Spring	Southern terminus
	6.930	11.153	SC 121 – Johnston, Saluda	Northern terminus
1.000 mi = 1.609 km; 1.000 km = 0.621 mi
