= South Carolina Highway 392 =

State highway near Ridge Spring, South Carolina

South Carolina Highway 392

Route information
- Maintained by SCDOT
- Length: 3.620 mi (5.826 km)

Major junctions
- South end: US 1 near Ridge Spring
- North end: SC 23 / SC 39 in Ridge Spring

Location
- Country: United States
- State: South Carolina
- Counties: Aiken, Saluda

Highway system
- South Carolina State Highway System; Interstate; US; State; Scenic
← SC 391	→ SC 394

South Carolina Highway 392 (SC 392) is a 3.620-mile-long (5.826 km) state highway in the U.S. state of South Carolina. The highway connects rural areas of Aiken and Saluda counties with Ridge Spring.

== Route description ==
SC 392 begins at an intersection with U.S. Route 1 (US 1; Columbia Highway) south-southeast of Ridge Spring, Aiken County. This intersection is southwest of Aiken Wayside Park. It travels to the northwest and curves to the north-northwest. The highway enters Saluda County. It crosses Flat Rock Creek and passes by Flat Rock Cemetery just before entering the city limits of Ridge Spring. At Main Street, it meets its northern terminus, an intersection with SC 23/SC 39.

== Major intersections ==
County	Location	mi	km	Destinations	Notes
Aiken		0.000	0.000	US 1 (Columbia Highway) – Aiken, Batesburg	Southern terminus
Saluda	Ridge Spring	3.620	5.826	SC 23 / SC 39 (Main Street) – Walhalla	Northern terminus
1.000 mi = 1.609 km; 1.000 km = 0.621 mi
