= Modoc, South Carolina =

- CDP
- Location in McCormick County and the state of South Carolina.
- Coordinates: 33°44′08″N 82°12′43″W
- Country: United States
- State: South Carolina
- County: McCormick

Area
  - Total: 7.17 sq mi (18.57 km^{2})
  - Land: 3.98 sq mi (10.32 km^{2})
  - Water: 3.19 sq mi (8.26 km^{2})
- Elevation: 328 ft (100 m)

Population (2020)
  - Total: 312
  - Density: 78.3/sq mi (30.24/km^{2})
- Time zone: UTC-5 (Eastern (EST))
  - Summer (DST): UTC-4 (EDT)
- ZIP code: 29838
- Area codes: 864, 821
- FIPS code: 45-47050
- GNIS feature ID: 2403298

Modoc is a census-designated place (CDP) in McCormick County, South Carolina, United States. The population was 256 at the 2000 census, and 218 at the 2010 census, a decline of 14.8%.

Local tradition holds that railroad engineers named Modoc for the Modoc indigenous tribe of Northern California, which was causing trouble for the railroad line, as the line was also having property rights disputes with local landowners.

== Geography ==
According to the United States Census Bureau, the CDP has a total area of 7.2 square miles (19 km^{2}), of which 4.1 square miles (11 km^{2}) is land and 3.1 square miles (8.0 km^{2}) (43.02%) is water. Its elevation is 401 to 413 feet above sea level.

== Demographics ==
Historical population
Census	Pop.	Note	%±
2020	312		—
U.S. Decennial Census

As of the census of 2000, there were 256 people, 120 households, and 78 families residing in the CDP. The population density was 62.7 inhabitants per square mile (24.2/km^{2}). There were 259 housing units at an average density of 63.5 per square mile (24.5/km^{2}). The racial makeup of the CDP was 100.00% White.

There were 120 households, out of which 16.7% had children under the age of 18 living with them, 55.8% were married couples living together, 8.3% had a female householder with no husband present, and 35.0% were non-families. 28.3% of all households were made up of individuals, and 11.7% had someone living alone who was 65 years of age or older. The average household size was 2.13 and the average family size was 2.63.

In the CDP, the population was spread out, with 15.6% under the age of 18, 3.1% from 18 to 24, 23.0% from 25 to 44, 34.8% from 45 to 64, and 23.4% who were 65 years of age or older. The median age was 51 years. For every 100 females, there were 103.2 males. For every 100 females age 18 and over, there were 100.0 males.

The median income for a household in the CDP was $42,031, and the median income for a family was $51,429. Males had a median income of $35,536 versus $21,591 for females. The per capita income for the CDP was $21,666. About 11.8% of families and 11.1% of the population were below the poverty line, including 28.2% of those under the age of eighteen and none of those 65 or over.
