= Livingston, South Carolina =

Town in South Carolina, United States

- Town
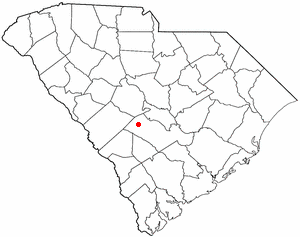
- Location of Livingston, South Carolina
- Coordinates: 33°33′11″N 81°07′22″W
- Country: United States
- State: South Carolina
- County: Orangeburg

Area
  - Total: 0.79 sq mi (2.04 km^{2})
  - Land: 0.79 sq mi (2.04 km^{2})
  - Water: 0 sq mi (0.00 km^{2})
- Elevation: 338 ft (103 m)

Population (2020)
  - Total: 132
  - Density: 167.8/sq mi (64.77/km^{2})
- Time zone: UTC-5 (Eastern (EST))
  - Summer (DST): UTC-4 (EDT)
- ZIP code: 29107
- Area codes: 803, 839
- FIPS code: 45-42100
- GNIS feature ID: 2406029

Livingston is a town in Orangeburg County, South Carolina, United States. As of the 2020 census, Livingston had a population of 132.

== Geography ==
According to the United States Census Bureau, the town has a total area of 0.8 square miles (2.1 km^{2}), all land.

== Demographics ==
Historical population
Census	Pop.	Note	%±
1900	79		—
1910	168		112.7%
1920	159		−5.4%
1930	198		24.5%
1940	178		−10.1%
1950	210		18.0%
1960	208		−1.0%
1970	165		−20.7%
1980	166		0.6%
1990	171		3.0%
2000	148		−13.5%
2010	136		−8.1%
2020	132		−2.9%
U.S. Decennial Census

=== 2020 census ===
Livingston town, South Carolina – Racial and ethnic composition Note: the US Census treats Hispanic/Latino as an ethnic category. This table excludes Latinos from the racial categories and assigns them to a separate category. Hispanics/Latinos may be of any race.
Race / Ethnicity (NH = Non-Hispanic)	Pop 2000	Pop 2010	Pop 2020	% 2000	% 2010	% 2020
White alone (NH)	121	101	98	81.76%	74.26%	74.24%
Black or African American alone (NH)	23	34	21	15.54%	25.00%	15.91%
Native American or Alaska Native alone (NH)	0	0	2	0.00%	0.00%	1.52%
Asian alone (NH)	0	0	0	0.00%	0.00%	0.00%
Native Hawaiian or Pacific Islander alone (NH)	0	0	0	0.00%	0.00%	0.00%
Other race alone (NH)	0	0	0	0.00%	0.00%	0.00%
Mixed race or Multiracial (NH)	4	1	9	2.70%	0.74%	6.82%
Hispanic or Latino (any race)	0	0	2	0.00%	0.00%	1.52%
Total	148	136	132	100.00%	100.00%	100.00%

=== 2000 census ===
As of the census of 2000, there were 148 people, 60 households, and 43 families residing in the town. The population density was 183.8 inhabitants per square mile (71.0/km^{2}). There were 67 housing units at an average density of 83.2 per square mile (32.1/km^{2}). The racial makeup of the town was 81.76% White, 15.54% African American, and 2.70% from two or more races.

There were 60 households, out of which 26.7% had children under the age of 18 living with them, 63.3% were married couples living together, 8.3% had a female householder with no husband present, and 28.3% were non-families. 25.0% of all households were made up of individuals, and 16.7% had someone living alone who was 65 years of age or older. The average household size was 2.47 and the average family size was 2.93.

In the town, the population was spread out, with 23.6% under the age of 18, 3.4% from 18 to 24, 26.4% from 25 to 44, 32.4% from 45 to 64, and 14.2% who were 65 years of age or older. The median age was 43 years. For every 100 females, there were 85.0 males. For every 100 females age 18 and over, there were 85.2 males.

The median income for a household in the town was $31,250, and the median income for a family was $39,167. Males had a median income of $28,000 versus $16,250 for females. The per capita income for the town was $13,751. There were 4.5% of families and 5.6% of the population living below the poverty line, including 3.6% of under eighteens and 22.7% of those over 64.
