= Perry, South Carolina =

Perry
- Town
- Location within South Carolina Location within the United States
- Coordinates: 33°37′32″N 81°18′26″W
- Country: United States
- State: South Carolina
- County: Aiken
- Named for: Benjamin Franklin Perry

Area
  - Total: 0.96 sq mi (2.48 km^{2})
  - Land: 0.96 sq mi (2.48 km^{2})
  - Water: 0 sq mi (0.00 km^{2})
- Elevation: 463 ft (141 m)

Population (2020)
  - Total: 194
  - Density: 202.6/sq mi (78.23/km^{2})
- Time zone: UTC-5 (Eastern (EST))
  - Summer (DST): UTC-4 (EDT)
- ZIP code: 29137
- Area codes: 803, 839
- FIPS code: 45-55960
- GNIS feature ID: 2407101
- Website: https://townofperrysc.com/

Perry is a town in Aiken County, South Carolina, United States. As of the 2020 census, Perry had a population of 194. It is part of the Augusta, Georgia metropolitan area.

== History ==
Perry was originally founded as Wagener before changing its name in 1888. It is named after Benjamin Franklin Perry, the provisional Governor of South Carolina after the Civil War.

== Geography ==
Perry is located in eastern Aiken County. It is 3 miles (5 km) east of the town of Wagener and 27 miles (43 km) east of the city of Aiken, the county seat. The town of Salley is 4 miles (6 km) to the south. A place called the Indian Head (springs) located just east of Pry on the Old Indian Trail. Site of an ancient Native American and colonial activity. It was on the Richard Davis tract of 1767.

According to the United States Census Bureau, the town has a total area of 1.2 square miles (3.0 km^{2}), all land.

== Demographics ==
Historical population
Census	Pop.	Note	%±
1890	69		—
1900	76		10.1%
1910	179		135.5%
1920	189		5.6%
1930	166		−12.2%
1940	141		−15.1%
1950	133		−5.7%
1960	196		47.4%
1970	209		6.6%
1980	273		30.6%
1990	241		−11.7%
2000	237		−1.7%
2010	233		−1.7%
2020	194		−16.7%
U.S. Decennial Census

As of the census of 2000, there were 237 people, 94 households, and 62 families residing in the town. The population density was 198.7 inhabitants per square mile (76.7/km^{2}). There were 124 housing units at an average density of 104.0 per square mile (40.2/km^{2}). The racial makeup of the town was 55.27% White, 44.30% African American and 0.42% Native American.

There were 94 households, out of which 34.0% had children under the age of 18 living with them, 38.3% were married couples living together, 23.4% had a female householder with no husband present, and 33.0% were non-families. 29.8% of all households were made up of individuals, and 7.4% had someone living alone who was 65 years of age or older. The average household size was 2.52 and the average family size was 3.16.

In the town, the population was spread out, with 31.2% under the age of 18, 7.6% from 18 to 24, 27.4% from 25 to 44, 24.5% from 45 to 64, and 9.3% who were 65 years of age or older. The median age was 33 years. For every 100 females, there were 80.9 males. For every 100 females age 18 and over, there were 79.1 males.

The median income for a household in the town was $23,750, and the median income for a family was $31,250. Males had a median income of $30,625 versus $23,000 for females. The per capita income for the town was $13,171. About 27.1% of families and 30.4% of the population were below the poverty line, including 51.3% of those under the age of eighteen and none of those 65 or over.

== Education ==
It is in the Aiken County Public School District.

Zoned schools are Busbee Elementary School, A. L. Corbett Middle School, and Wagener-Salley High School.
