= North, South Carolina =

Town in South Carolina, US

North
- Town
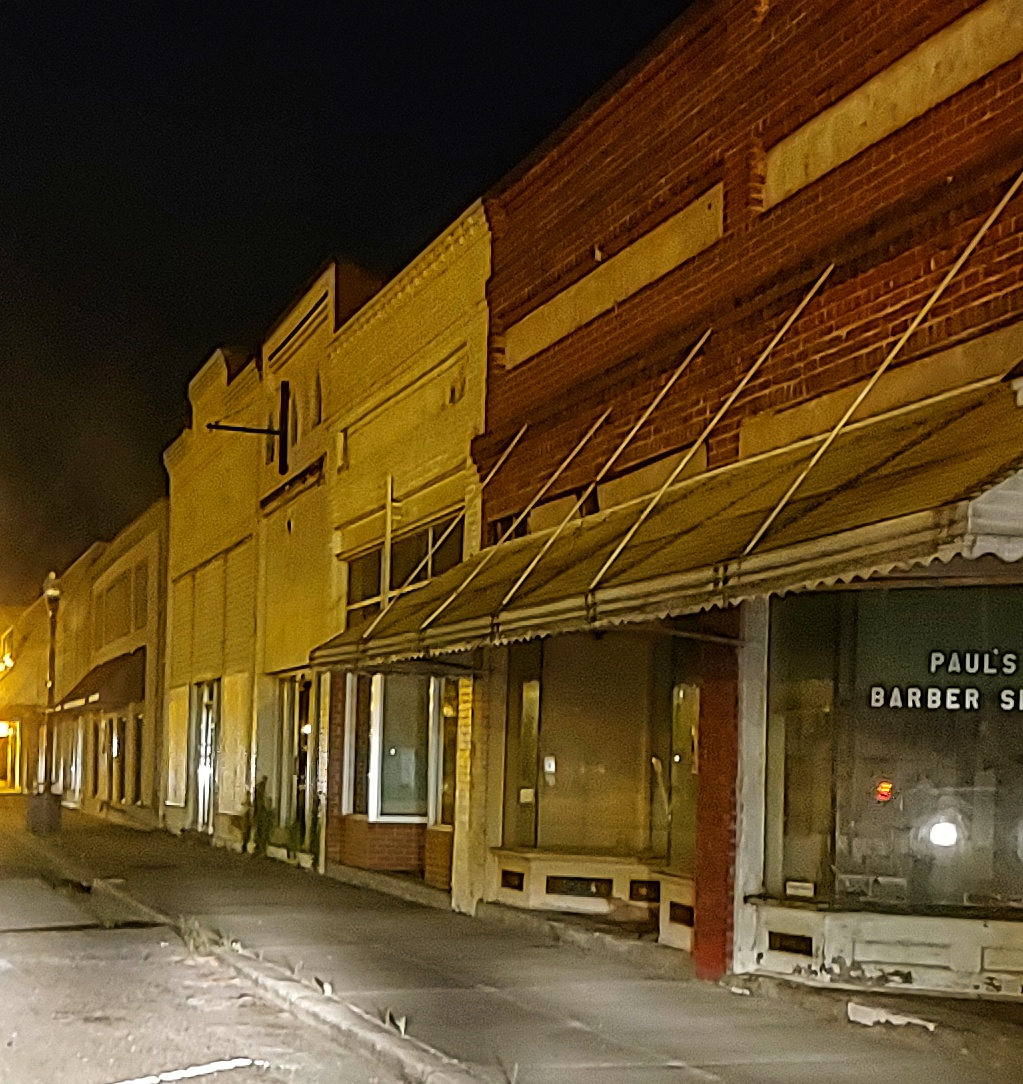
- Downtown North

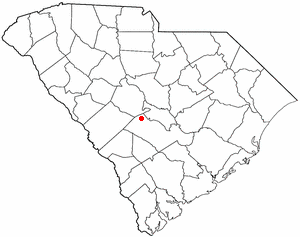
- Location in Orangeburg County, South Carolina
- Coordinates: 33°37′13″N 81°06′08″W
- Country: United States
- State: South Carolina
- County: Orangeburg

Area
  - Total: 0.86 sq mi (2.24 km^{2})
  - Land: 0.86 sq mi (2.24 km^{2})
  - Water: 0 sq mi (0.00 km^{2})
- Elevation: 279 ft (85 m)

Population (2020)
  - Total: 696
  - Density: 805.4/sq mi (310.97/km^{2})
- Time zone: UTC−05:00 (EST)
  - Summer (DST): UTC−04:00 (EDT)
- ZIP Code: 29112
- Area codes: 803, 839
- FIPS code: 45-50560
- GNIS feature ID: 2407002
- Website: Town website

North is a town in Orangeburg County, South Carolina, United States. The population was 696 at the 2020 census.

== Geography ==
According to the United States Census Bureau, the town has a total area of 0.9 square miles (2.3 km^{2}), all land.

== History ==
In 1891, the South Bound Railroad came through the area with the assistance of John F. North. In 1892, John North, along with George W. Pou and Sampson A. Livingston, donated 100 acres (40.5 ha) for the railway depot and townsite. A U.S. Post Office branch was also later established. The next year John North, a Confederate veteran and businessman, was elected the first mayor of his namesake town of North, South Carolina. The town has been noted for its unusual place name.

== Demographics ==
Historical population
Census	Pop.	Note	%±
1900	368		—
1910	561		52.4%
1920	700		24.8%
1930	755		7.9%
1940	733		−2.9%
1950	954		30.2%
1960	1,047		9.7%
1970	1,076		2.8%
1980	1,304		21.2%
1990	809		−38.0%
2000	813		0.5%
2010	754		−7.3%
2020	696		−7.7%
U.S. Decennial Census

=== 2020 census ===
North town, South Carolina – Racial and ethnic composition Note: the US Census treats Hispanic/Latino as an ethnic category. This table excludes Latinos from the racial categories and assigns them to a separate category. Hispanics/Latinos may be of any race.
Race / Ethnicity (NH = Non-Hispanic)	Pop 2000	Pop 2010	Pop 2020	% 2000	% 2010	% 2020
White alone (NH)	428	365	321	52.64%	48.41%	46.12%
Black or African American alone (NH)	372	352	320	45.76%	46.86%	45.98%
Native American or Alaska Native alone (NH)	3	6	18	0.37%	0.80%	2.59%
Asian alone (NH)	0	1	1	0.00%	0.13%	0.14%
Native Hawaiian or Pacific Islander alone (NH)	0	0	1	0.00%	0.00%	0.14%
Other race alone (NH)	0	0	1	0.00%	0.00%	0.14%
Mixed race or Multiracial (NH)	3	24	21	0.37%	3.18%	3.02%
Hispanic or Latino (any race)	7	6	13	0.86%	0.80%	1.87%
Total	813	754	696	100.00%	100.00%	100.00%

As of the 2020 United States census, there were 696 people, 329 households, and 156 families residing in the town.

=== 2000 census ===
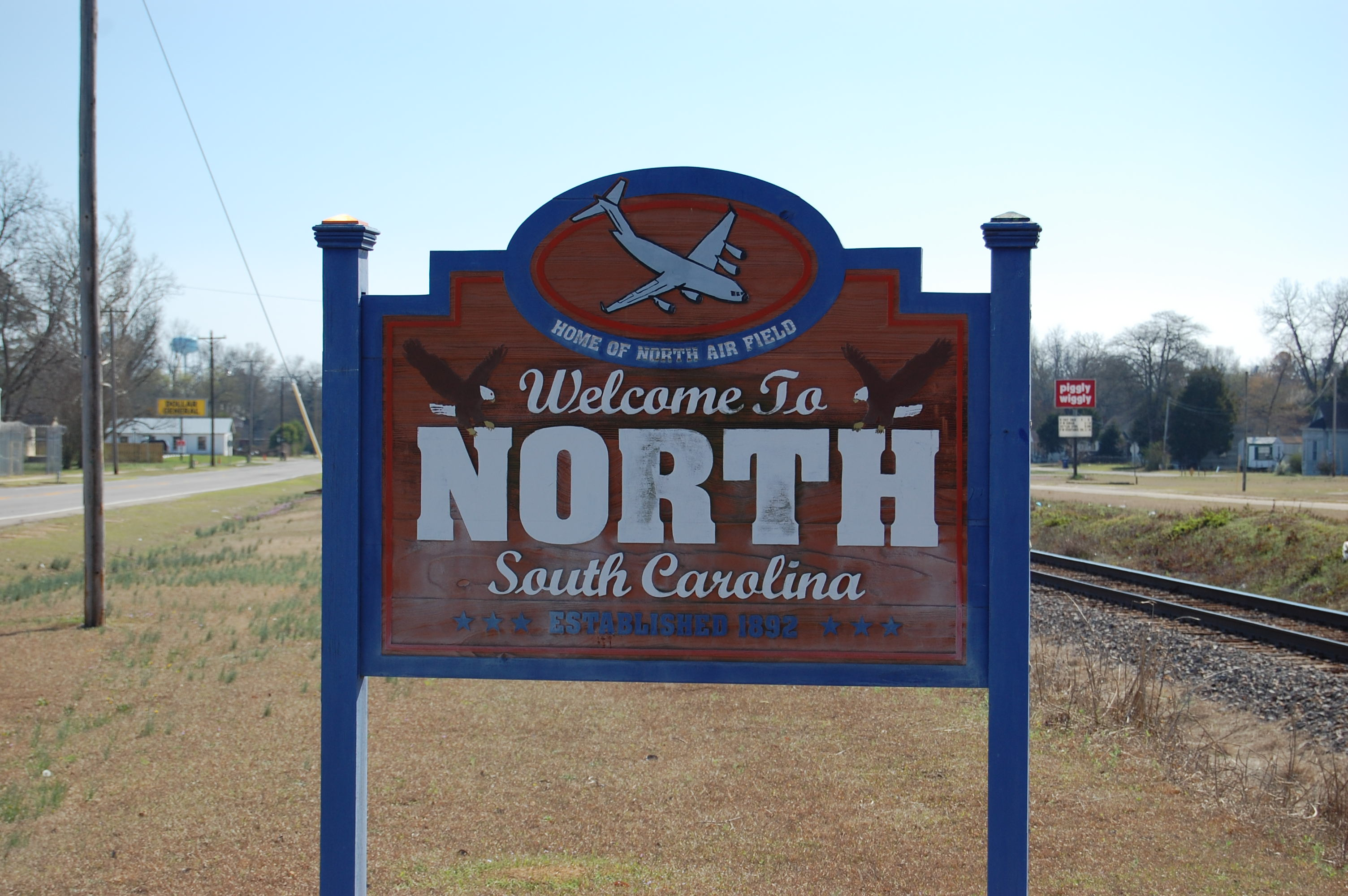
Photo of sign welcoming visitors to North, SC

As of the census of 2000, there were 813 people, 356 households, and 223 families residing in the town. The population density was 953.7 inhabitants per square mile (368.2/km^{2}). There were 412 housing units at an average density of 483.3 per square mile (186.6/km^{2}). The racial makeup of the town was 52.64% White, 46.37% African American, 0.37% Native American, and 0.62% from two or more races. Hispanic or Latino of any race were 0.86% of the population.

There were 356 households, out of which 25.3% had children under the age of 18 living with them, 38.5% were married couples living together, 19.7% had a female householder with no husband present, and 37.1% were non-families. 34.6% of all households were made up of individuals, and 18.8% had someone living alone who was 65 years of age or older. The average household size was 2.28 and the average family size was 2.94.

In the town, the population was spread out, with 23.5% under the age of 18, 9.7% from 18 to 24, 23.1% from 25 to 44, 25.3% from 45 to 64, and 18.3% who were 65 years of age or older. The median age was 40 years. For every 100 females, there were 80.7 males. For every 100 females age 18 and over, there were 74.7 males.

The median income for a household in the town was $21,136, and the median income for a family was $30,750. Males had a median income of $24,286 versus $21,406 for females. The per capita income for the town was $14,237. About 27.5% of families and 30.5% of the population were below the poverty line, including 39.3% of those under age 18 and 24.2% of those age 65 or over.

== Government and infrastructure ==
=== Postal service ===
The United States Postal Service operates the North Post Office at 7903 Salley Road.

=== Public library ===
North has a public library, a branch of the Orangeburg County Library.

== Notable people ==
- Chuck Darby (born 1975), American football player
- Eartha Kitt (1927–2008), singer and actress
- Freddie Martino (born 1991), American football player
- Alana McLaughlin (born 1982 or 1983), martial artist
