= Wagener, South Carolina =

Wagener
- Town
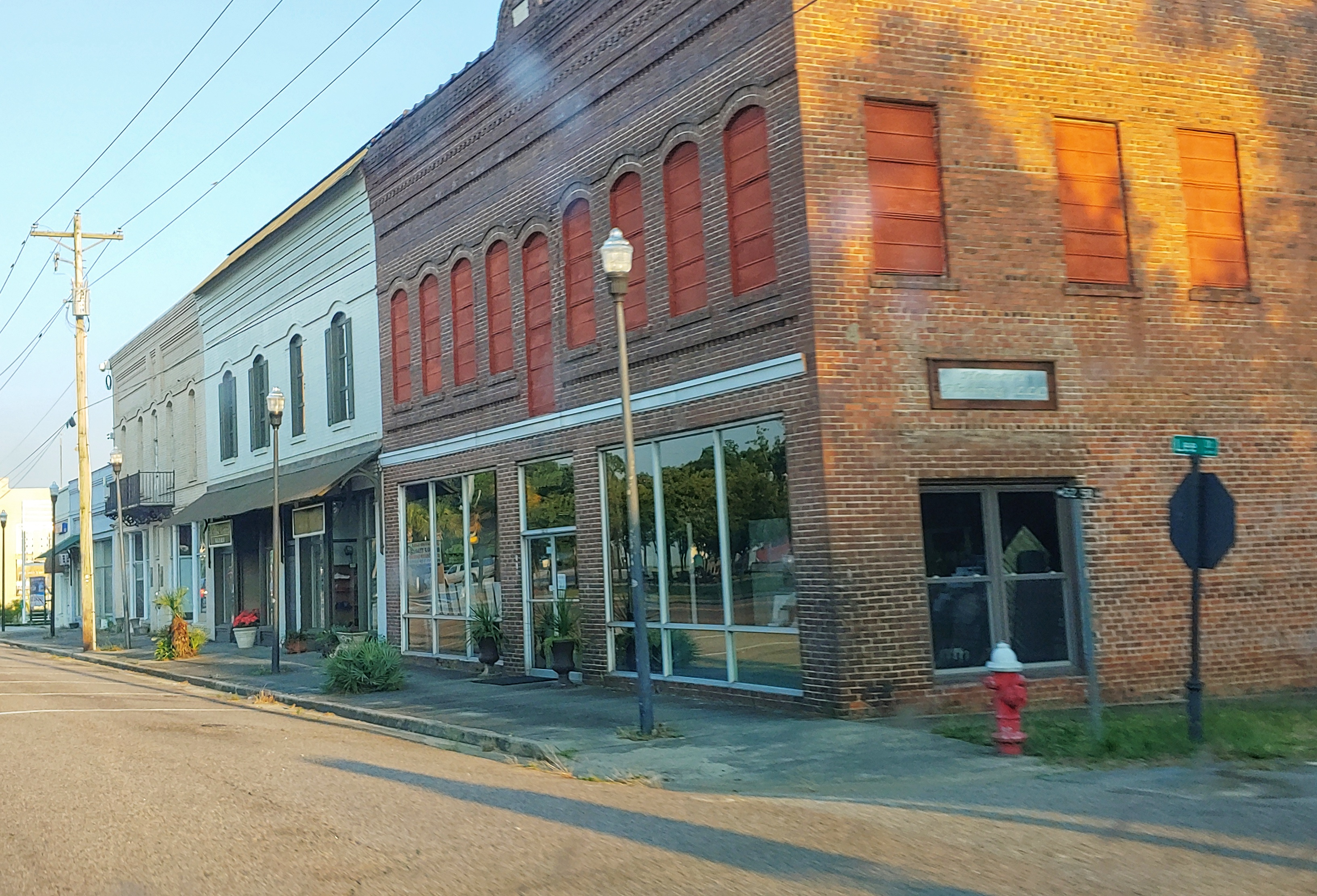
- Nickname: Gaigeville
- Location within South Carolina Location within the United States
- Coordinates: 33°39′14″N 81°22′10″W
- Country: United States
- State: South Carolina
- County: Aiken
- Named for: George Wagener

Area
  - Total: 1.35 sq mi (3.49 km^{2})
  - Land: 1.34 sq mi (3.47 km^{2})
  - Water: 0.0077 sq mi (0.02 km^{2})
- Elevation: 466 ft (142 m)

Population (2020)
  - Total: 631
  - Density: 471/sq mi (181.8/km^{2})
- Time zone: UTC-5 (Eastern (EST))
  - Summer (DST): UTC-4 (EDT)
- ZIP code: 29164
- Area codes: 803, 839
- FIPS code: 45-74050
- GNIS feature ID: 2406814
- Website: www.wagenersc.com

Wagener is a town in Aiken County, South Carolina, United States. As of the 2020 census, Wagener had a population of 631. As of 2010, the town was the largest settlement in the county north of the South Fork Edisto River. It is part of the Augusta, Georgia metropolitan area.

== Geography ==
Wagener is located in eastern Aiken County.

According to the United States Census Bureau, the town has a total area of 1.2 square miles (3.1 km^{2}), of which 0.008 square miles (0.02 km^{2}), or 0.60%, is water.

== Demographics ==
Historical population
Census	Pop.	Note	%±
1900	192		—
1910	362		88.5%
1920	597		64.9%
1930	546		−8.5%
1940	588		7.7%
1950	584		−0.7%
1960	614		5.1%
1970	723		17.8%
1980	903		24.9%
1990	731		−19.0%
2000	863		18.1%
2010	797		−7.6%
2020	631		−20.8%
U.S. Decennial Census

=== Racial and ethnic composition ===
Wagener town, South Carolina – Racial and ethnic composition Note: the US Census treats Hispanic/Latino as an ethnic category. This table excludes Latinos from the racial categories and assigns them to a separate category. Hispanics/Latinos may be of any race.
Race / Ethnicity (NH = Non-Hispanic)	Pop 2000	Pop 2010	Pop 2020	% 2000	% 2010	% 2020
White alone (NH)	322	252	226	37.31%	31.62%	35.82%
Black or African American alone (NH)	526	507	368	60.95%	63.61%	58.32%
Native American or Alaska Native alone (NH)	0	4	3	0.00%	0.50%	0.48%
Asian alone (NH)	3	3	1	0.35%	0.38%	0.16%
Native Hawaiian or Pacific Islander alone (NH)	0	0	1	0.00%	0.00%	0.16%
Other race alone (NH)	0	0	2	0.00%	0.00%	0.32%
Mixed race or Multiracial (NH)	4	19	23	0.46%	2.38%	3.65%
Hispanic or Latino (any race)	8	12	7	0.93%	1.51%	1.11%
Total	863	797	631	100.00%	100.00%	100.00%

=== 2020 census ===
As of the 2020 United States census, there were 631 people, 320 households, and 261 families residing in the town.

=== 2012 ===
As of the census of 2012, there were 809 people, 368 (45.5%) males, and 441 (54.5%) females. Median resident age was 38.4

=== 2000 census ===
As of the census of 2000, there were 863 people, 347 households, and 239 families residing in the town. The population density was 685.1 inhabitants per square mile (264.5/km^{2}). There were 424 housing units at an average density of 336.6 per square mile (130.0/km^{2}). The racial makeup of the town was 61.53% African American, 37.54% White, 0.35% Asian, and 0.58% from two or more races. Hispanic or Latino of any race were 0.93% of the population.

There were 347 households, out of which 32.6% had children under the age of 18 living with them, 38.0% were married couples living together, 26.2% had a female householder with no husband present, and 31.1% were non-families. 27.4% of all households were made up of individuals, and 13.0% had someone living alone who was 65 years of age or older. The average household size was 2.49 and the average family size was 3.04.

In the town, the population was spread out, with 28.2% under the age of 18, 9.4% from 18 to 24, 26.4% from 25 to 44, 22.6% from 45 to 64, and 13.4% who were 65 years of age or older. The median age was 36 years. For every 100 females, there were 88.0 males. For every 100 females age 18 and over, there were 81.8 males.

The median income for a household in the town was $24,773, and the median income for a family was $29,833. Males had a median income of $28,182 versus $17,212 for females. The per capita income for the town was $13,805. About 15.2% of families and 17.9% of the population were below the poverty line, including 25.0% of those under age 18 and 18.4% of those age 65 or over

== Education ==
It is in the Aiken County Public School District.

Zoned schools are Cyril B. Busbee Elementary School, A. L. Corbett Middle School, and Wagener-Salley High School. All three schools are in the Wagener town limits.

Wagener has a public library, a branch of the ABBE Regional Library System.
