= Monetta, South Carolina =

- Town
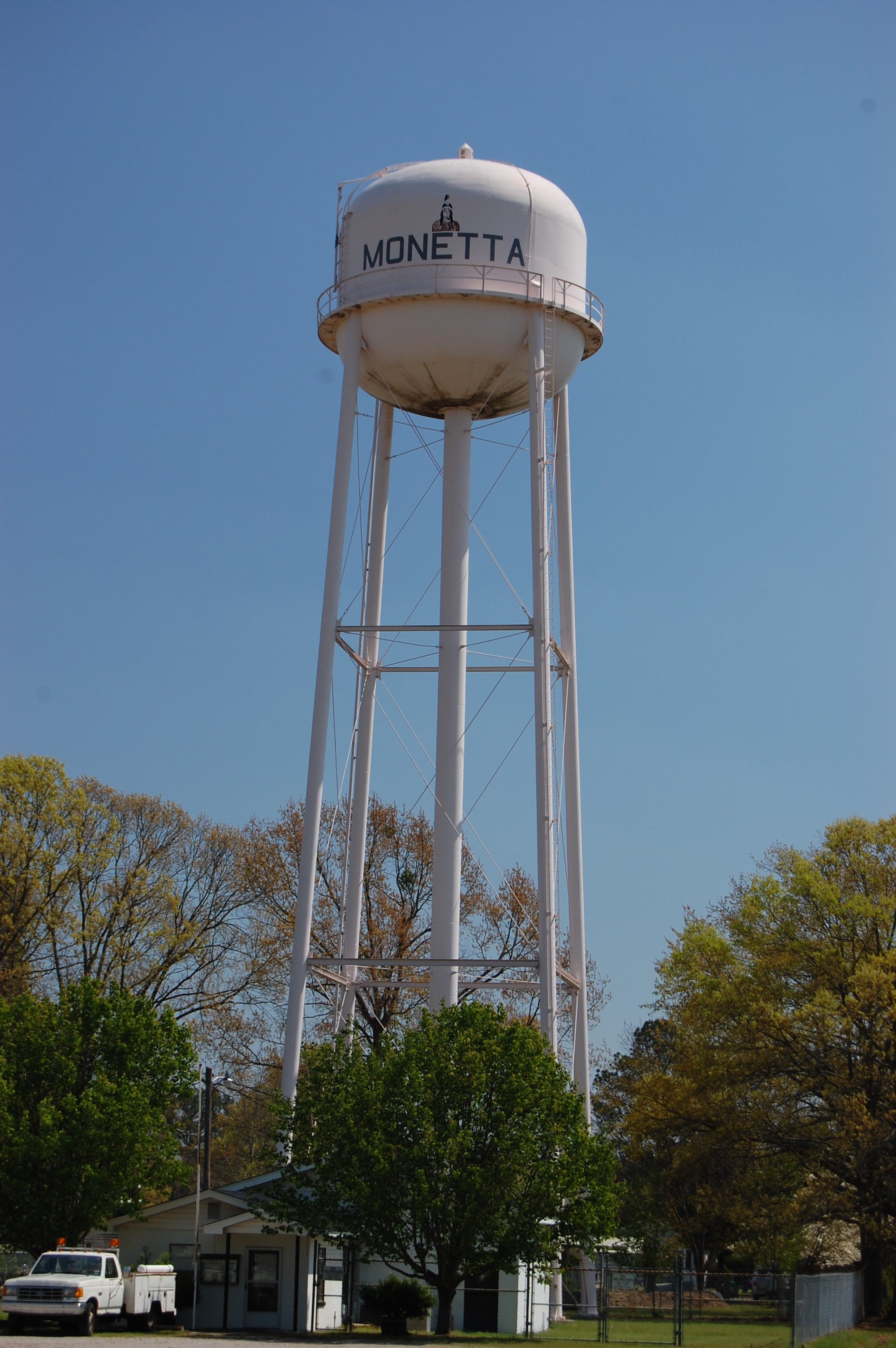
- Water tower in Monetta

- Location within the state of South Carolina
- Coordinates: 33°51′00″N 81°36′36″W
- Country: United States
- State: South Carolina
- Counties: Aiken, Saluda

Area
  - Total: 0.69 sq mi (1.79 km^{2})
  - Land: 0.69 sq mi (1.79 km^{2})
  - Water: 0 sq mi (0.00 km^{2})
- Elevation: 633 ft (193 m)

Population (2020)
  - Total: 205
  - Density: 297.2/sq mi (114.74/km^{2})
- Time zone: UTC-5 (Eastern (EST))
  - Summer (DST): UTC-4 (EDT)
- ZIP code: 29105
- Area codes: 803, 839
- FIPS code: 45-47320
- GNIS feature ID: 2406177
- Website: http://townofmonetta.org/

Monetta is a town in Aiken and Saluda counties, South Carolina, United States. As of the 2020 census, Monetta had a population of 205.

The Aiken County portion of Monetta is part of the Augusta, Georgia metropolitan area. The Saluda County portion of Monetta is part of the Columbia, SC Metropolitan Area.

== Geography ==
Monetta is located near the southern corner of Saluda County and the northern corner of Aiken County. U.S. Route 1 passes through the town, leading northeast to Batesburg-Leesville and then Columbia, the state capital, and southwest to Aiken.

According to the United States Census Bureau, the town has a total area of 0.73 square miles (1.9 km^{2}), all land.

== Demographics ==
Historical population
Census	Pop.	Note	%±
1910	122		—
1920	137		12.3%
1930	203		48.2%
1940	114		−43.8%
1950	84		−26.3%
1960	109		29.8%
1970	269		146.8%
1980	273		1.5%
1990	285		4.4%
2000	220		−22.8%
2010	236		7.3%
2020	205		−13.1%
U.S. Decennial Census

As of the census of 2000, there were 220 people, 92 households, and 64 families living in the town. The population density was 298.7 inhabitants per square mile (115.3/km^{2}). There were 108 housing units at an average density of 146.6 per square mile (56.6/km^{2}). The racial makeup of the town was 73.64% White, 24.55% African American, and 1.82% from two or more races. Hispanic or Latino of any race were 5.00% of the population.

There were 92 households, out of which 34.8% had children under the age of 18 living with them, 51.1% were married couples living together, 15.2% had a female householder with no husband present, and 30.4% were non-families. 28.3% of all households were made up of individuals, and 15.2% had someone living alone who was 65 years of age or older. The average household size was 2.39 and the average family size was 2.92.

In the town, the population was spread out, with 24.5% under the age of 18, 6.8% from 18 to 24, 27.3% from 25 to 44, 26.8% from 45 to 64, and 14.5% who were 65 years of age or older. The median age was 40 years. For every 100 females, there were 76.0 males. For every 100 females age 18 and over, there were 78.5 males.

The median income for a household in the town was $28,750, and the median income for a family was $39,167. Males had a median income of $30,000 versus $21,875 for females. The per capita income for the town was $16,867. About 8.1% of families and 6.5% of the population were below the poverty line, including none of those under the age of eighteen and 10.3% of those 65 or over.

=== 2010 Demographics ===
The following is from the 2010 Demographics Total Population 236 (100.00%)

Population by Race Black or African American alone 44 (18.64%) Some other race alone 9 (3.81%) Two or more races 10 (4.24%) White alone 173 (73.31%)

Population by Hispanic or Latino Origin (of any race) Persons Not of Hispanic or Latino Origin 204 (86.44%) Persons of Hispanic or Latino Origin 32 (13.56%)

Population by Gender Female 129 (54.66%) Male 107 (45.34%)

Population by Age Persons 0 to 4 years 8 (3.39%) Persons 5 to 17 years 43 (18.22%) Persons 18 to 64 years 147 (62.29%) Persons 65 years and over 38 (16.10%)

=== Other demographics ===
In 2023, of the 205 residents, 111 lived in Aiken County and 94 lived in Saluda County.

== Education ==
Portions in both counties are in the Aiken County Public School District.

Ridge Spring-Monetta Middle-High School, which has a Monetta postal address, and is outside of the city limits in unincorporated Aiken County, is the secondary school of the area.

Areas of the district in the Monetta area and in Saluda County are zoned to Ridge Spring-Monetta Elementary School and Ridge Spring-Monetta Middle-High School.
