= Salley, South Carolina =

- Town
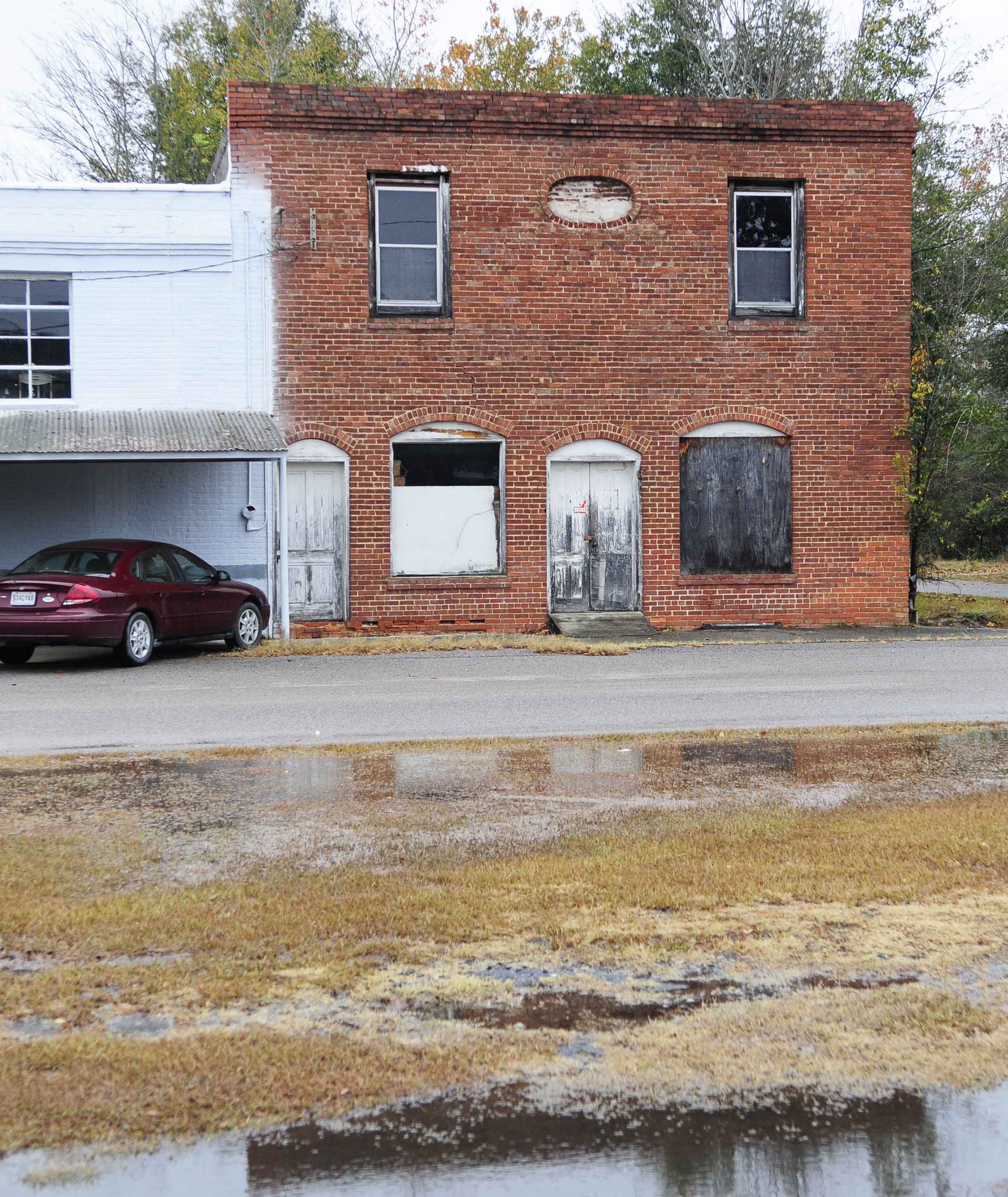

- Location within South Carolina Location within the United States
- Coordinates: 33°34′02″N 81°18′14″W
- Country: United States
- State: South Carolina
- County: Aiken
- Named for: Dempsey Salley

Area
  - Total: 0.78 sq mi (2.01 km^{2})
  - Land: 0.76 sq mi (1.98 km^{2})
  - Water: 0.012 sq mi (0.03 km^{2})
- Elevation: 367 ft (112 m)

Population (2020)
  - Total: 329
  - Density: 429.7/sq mi (165.92/km^{2})
- Time zone: UTC-5 (Eastern (EST))
  - Summer (DST): UTC-4 (EDT)
- ZIP code: 29137
- Area codes: 803, 839
- FIPS code: 45-63115
- GNIS feature ID: 2407277
- Website: townofsalley.sc.gov

Salley is a town in Aiken County, South Carolina, United States. As of the 2020 census, Salley had a population of 329. It is part of the Augusta, Georgia metropolitan area.

Salley is known for hosting the Chitlin Strut, a town-wide festival, every November.

== History ==
In 1735, the town was settled as John's Town by Swiss-German families who were given land grants by King George II. On December 19, 1887, it was renamed to Salley in honor of Dempsey Salley, a South Carolina Legislative member.

The Salley Historic District was listed on the National Register of Historic Places in 2000.

Salley elected LaDonna Hall as mayor on November 5, 2019. Mayor Hall was the first Black American and the first woman elected to this position in the town's history. The incumbent mayor unsuccessfully challenged those results.

== Geography ==
Salley is located in eastern Aiken County.

According to the United States Census Bureau, the town has a total area of 0.77 square miles (2.0 km^{2}), of which 0.012 square miles (0.03 km^{2}), or 1.41%, is water.

== Demographics ==
Historical population
Census	Pop.	Note	%±
1890	252		—
1900	241		−4.4%
1910	311		29.0%
1920	400		28.6%
1930	433		8.3%
1940	443		2.3%
1950	407		−8.1%
1960	403		−1.0%
1970	450		11.7%
1980	584		29.8%
1990	451		−22.8%
2000	410		−9.1%
2010	398		−2.9%
2020	329		−17.3%
U.S. Decennial Census

As of the census of 2000, there were 410 people, 165 households, and 110 families residing in the town. The population density was 529.0 inhabitants per square mile (204.2/km^{2}). There were 194 housing units at an average density of 250.3 per square mile (96.6/km^{2}). The racial makeup of the town was 49.27% African American, 46.83% White, 1.71% Native American, 0.98% Asian, and 1.22% from two or more races. Hispanic or Latino of any race were 0.24% of the population.

There were 165 households, out of which 26.1% had children under the age of 18 living with them, 40.0% were married couples living together, 21.8% had a female householder with no husband present, and 33.3% were non-families. 30.3% of all households were made up of individuals, and 17.6% had someone living alone who was 65 years of age or older. The average household size was 2.48 and the average family size was 3.10.

In the town, the population was spread out, with 22.9% under the age of 18, 8.8% from 18 to 24, 26.1% from 25 to 44, 22.2% from 45 to 64, and 20.0% who were 65 years of age or older. The median age was 40 years. For every 100 females, there were 83.9 males. For every 100 females age 18 and over, there were 80.6 males.

The median income for a household in the town was $28,750, and the median income for a family was $41,250. Males had a median income of $39,063 versus $18,661 for females. The per capita income for the town was $12,250. About 28.6% of families and 28.4% of the population were below the poverty line, including 46.1% of those under age 18 and 36.1% of those age 65 or over.

== Education ==
It is in the Aiken County Public School District.

Zoned schools are Busbee Elementary School, A. L. Corbett Middle School, and Wagener-Salley High School.
