= U.S. Route 78 in South Carolina =

State highway in South Carolina

U.S. Highway 78
- US 78 highlighted in red

Route information
- Maintained by SCDOT
- Length: 142.207 mi (228.860 km)
- Existed: 1927–present
- Tourist routes: SC Heritage Corridor: Discovery Route

Major junctions
- West end: US 1 / US 25 / US 78 / US 278 / SR 10 / SR 121 at the Georgia state line near North Augusta
- US 25 / SC 121 in North Augusta; I-520 in North Augusta; US 278 / SC 125 / SC 421 near Clearwater; US 1 / SC 19 in Aiken; US 301 / US 601 in Bamberg; I-95 in St. George; I-26 near Ladson; US 52 in North Charleston; I-526 in North Charleston; I-26 / US 17 in Charleston
- East end: Line Street / King Street in Charleston

Location
- Country: United States
- State: South Carolina
- Counties: Aiken, Barnwell, Bamberg, Orangeburg, Dorchester, Charleston

Highway system
- United States Numbered Highway System; List; Special; Divided; South Carolina State Highway System; Interstate; US; State; Scenic
← I-77	→ SC 79

U.S. Route 78 (US 78) is a 142.207-mile (228.860 km) U.S. highway that travels from Swifton, Arkansas to Charleston, South Carolina. In the U.S. state of South Carolina, it travels from the Savannah River at North Augusta to its eastern terminus in Charleston; connecting the cities of Aiken, Summerville, and North Charleston.

== Route description ==
US 78 enters South Carolina by crossing the Savannah River in North Augusta; sharing concurrences with US 1, US 25, US 278 and South Carolina Highway 121 (SC 121). In the immediate 2-mile (3.2 km) area, it sheds most concurrencies, sharing only with US 1 towards Aiken; it also connects with Interstate 520 (I-520), which is a partial beltway around the Augusta metropolitan area. In Aiken, it travels through the downtown area, where US 1 splits north towards Columbia. West of Williston is SC 781, which connects back with US 278; the routing allows travelers to bypass Aiken all together between Williston and Augusta.

Traveling in a southeasterly direction, it goes through the cities and towns of Williston, Blackville, Denmark, Bamberg, Branchville and St. George, where connects with I-95. Continuing east, it passes through Dorchester and begins to parallel with I-26 in a southeasterly direction through Summerville. It enters Charleston County at Lincolnville, where the highway skirts just inches south of the Berkeley County line. In North Charleston, US 78 shares a concurrency with US 52, as it connects with I-526. Entering Charleston, it splits with US 52 and goes south along King Street; its eastern terminus at Line Street, a block away from US 52's eastern/southern terminus and nearby to I-26/US 17 interchange.

US 78 is a predominantly two-lane rural highway connecting much of the Lowcountry. Wider sections (four-lanes or more) are found between North Augusta–Aiken, St. George, and North Charleston. Though it provides the most direct route between Augusta (and points west, such as Atlanta) and Charleston (using US 278 and SC 781 to bypass Aiken), it is not a busy route because of the many cities and towns it goes through.

== History ==
Established in 1927 as an original US highway, it traveled closely as it does today; from North Augusta to Charleston, connecting the cities and towns of Aiken, Bamberg, St. George, and North Charleston.

By 1931, US 78 was rerouted north of Summerville and Lincolnville, leaving Richardson Avenue/Lincoln Avenue. Around 1939, US 78 was realigned from Meeting Street to Rivers Street, south of Durant Avenue in the Charleston area. Also in 1939, US 78 was fully paved in the state, its last unpaved section was between St. George and US 178. By 1952, US 78 was placed on new four-lane highway bypassing Clearwater, Burnettown, and Gloverville; also by same year a new bridge was constructed over the Savannah River, leaving Fifth Street Bridge. By 1967, US 78 was adjusted to bypass south of mainstreet Blackville, leaving a secondary road, but was later upgraded as a connector (signed as a business loop).

== Major intersections ==
County	Location	mi	km	Destinations	Notes
Savannah River		0.000	0.000	US 1 south / US 25 south / SR 121 south / US 78 west / US 278 west / SR 10 west (Gordon Highway) – Augusta	Continuation into Georgia
Savannah River		0.000– 0.005	0.000– 0.0080	South Carolina–Georgia state line	
Aiken	North Augusta	0.188– 0.340	0.303– 0.547	5th Street Bridge / River North Drive	Interchange
Aiken	North Augusta	0.640– 0.710	1.030– 1.143	US 25 / SC 121 north – North Augusta, Edgefield	East end of freeway section; eastern end of US 25 and SC 121 concurrencies
Aiken	North Augusta	0.870	1.400	Buena Vista Avenue (SC 125 Conn. west) to I-20 / SC 230	Right-in/right-out interchange; westbound exit and entrance; eastern terminus of SC 125 Conn.
Aiken	North Augusta	1.560– 1.950	2.511– 3.138	I-520 (Palmetto Parkway) – Augusta, Columbia, Atlanta	I-520 exit 17
Aiken	Clearwater	2.150– 2.380	3.460– 3.830	US 278 east / SC 125 (Atomic Road) – Beech Island, Savannah River Site SC 421 north (Augusta Road) – Clearwater	Interchange; eastern end of US 278 concurrency; southern terminus of SC 421
Aiken	Clearwater–Burnettown line	4.040	6.502	SC 126 (Belvedere–Clearwater Road) – Belvedere	
Aiken	Warrenville	10.324– 10.330	16.615– 16.625	SC 191 (Main Street) – Graniteville, Vaucluse, Warrenville	
Aiken	Aiken	12.300	19.795	US 1 Truck north / US 78 Truck east / SC 19 Truck / SC 118 (Robert M Bell Parkway / Hitchcock Parkway) to I-20 / SC 302	Southern terminus of US 1 Truck; western terminus of US 78 Truck; to USC Aiken
Aiken	Aiken	12.470	20.069	SC 421 south (Augusta Road)	Northern terminus of SC 421; no left turn allowed from SC 421 NB to US 1 SB/US 78 WB
Aiken	Aiken	15.620	25.138	SC 19 (Laurens Street) – Eureka, Edgefield	
Aiken	Aiken	15.800	25.428	SC 19 Conn. (Chesterfield Street) – Savannah River Site	Signed also as SC 19
Aiken	Aiken	15.890	25.572	US 1 north (York Street NE)	Eastern end of US 1 concurrency
Aiken		18.250	29.371	SC 4 east (Wagener Road) to SC 302	Western terminus of SC 4
Aiken		18.450	29.692	US 78 Truck west / SC 4 Truck east / SC 118 south / SC 302 (Pine Log Road SE) to US 1 Truck / I-20	Western end of SC 4 Truck concurrency; eastern terminus of US 78 Truck; northern terminus of SC 118
Aiken	Windsor	28.880	46.478	SC 4 Truck east (State Park Road) – Aiken State Park, State Park Boat Landing	Eastern end of SC 4 Truck concurrency
Aiken		34.157	54.970	SC 781 west (Tinker Creek Road)	Eastern terminus of SC 781
Barnwell	Williston	37.297	60.024	SC 39 south (Rosemary Street / Dunbarton Road)	Western end of SC 39 concurrency
Barnwell	Williston	37.550	60.431	SC 39 north (Elko Street / Springfield Road) – Springfield	Eastern end of SC 39 concurrency
Barnwell	Elko	40.470	65.130	SC 37 (Bay Street) – Barnwell, Springfield	
Barnwell	Blackville	46.930	75.527	US 78 Bus. east (Walker Street)	Signed western terminus of US 78 Bus.
Barnwell	Blackville	47.010	75.655	SC 3 (Solomon Blatt Avenue) – Barnwell	
Barnwell	Blackville	47.090	75.784	SC 304 south (Lartigue Street) – Hilda	Northern terminus of SC 304
Barnwell	Blackville	47.540	76.508	US 78 Bus. west (Main Street / US 78 Conn. west)	Eastern terminus of US 78 Bus./US 78 Conn.
Bamberg	Denmark	55.250	88.916	US 321 / SC 70 (Palmetto Avenue) – Orangeburg, Barnwell	
Bamberg	Bamberg	61.960	99.715	US 301 / US 601 – Orangeburg, Allendale, Ehrhardt	
Bamberg	Bamberg	62.710	100.922	SC 362 south – Smoaks, Williams	Northern terminus of SC 362
Bamberg		71.980	115.841	SC 61 south (Edisto River Road)	Northern terminus of SC 61
Bamberg		72.170	116.146	US 78 Conn. south to SC 61	Northern terminus of US 78 Conn.
Orangeburg	Branchville	76.660	123.372	US 21 south (Freedom Road) – Smoaks, Walterboro, Savannah	Western end of US 21 concurrency
Orangeburg	Branchville	76.860	123.694	US 21 north (Freedom Road) – Orangeburg, Columbia	Eastern end of US 21 concurrency
Dorchester	St. George	89.810– 89.830	144.535– 144.567	I-95 – Savannah, Florence	I-95 exit 77
Dorchester	St. George	91.830	147.786	US 15 (Parler Avenue) – Walterboro, Santee	
Dorchester		105.470	169.738	US 178 west (East Main Street) – Harleyville	Eastern terminus of US 178
Dorchester		108.176	174.092	SC 27 north (Ridgeville Road) – Holly Hill	Western end of SC 27 concurrency
Dorchester		108.664	174.878	SC 27 south (Ridgeville Road) – Ridgeville	Eastern end of SC 27 concurrency
Dorchester		110.114	177.211	School Street west (SC 173 west) / Myers–Mayo Road east	Eastern terminus of SC 173 and School Street; western terminus of Myers–Mayo Road
Dorchester	Summerville	119.124	191.711	US 17 Alt. (North Main Street) – Walterboro, Moncks Corner	
Dorchester	Summerville	119.404	192.162	SC 165 (Berlin G. Myers Parkway / US 17 Alt. Truck) – Ravenel	
Charleston	North Charleston	126.114– 126.139	202.961– 203.001	I-26 – Columbia, Charleston	I-26 exit 205
Charleston	North Charleston	127.534– 128.334	205.246– 206.534	US 52 west / N.A.D. Road east – Goose Creek, Moncks Corner	Western end of US 52 concurrency; western terminus of N.A.D. Road; interchange
Charleston	North Charleston	129.224	207.966	US 52 Conn. south to I-26 east – Charleston	Northern terminus of US 52 Conn.; I-26 exit 209A; no access to I-26 west
Charleston	North Charleston	133.844– 134.034	215.401– 215.707	I-526 (Mark Clark Expressway) – Savannah, Mount Pleasant	I-526 exit 18
Charleston	North Charleston	137.044	220.551	SC 642 west (Dorchester Road)	Eastern terminus of SC 642
Charleston	North Charleston	137.194	220.792	SC 7 south (Cosgrove Avenue)	Northern terminus of SC 7
Charleston	North Charleston	137.684	221.581	US 52 east (Carner Avenue)	Eastern end of US 52 concurrency
Charleston	Charleston	142.081	228.657	I-26 east / US 17 south / Carolina Street / Sheppard Street	I-26’s eastbound and US 17’s southbound exit only
Charleston	Charleston	142.207	228.860	Line Street to US 17 north / King Street east	Eastern terminus; King Street continues past terminus
1.000 mi = 1.609 km; 1.000 km = 0.621 mi: Concurrency terminus; Incomplete access

== See also ==
- Special routes of U.S. Route 78

U.S. Route 78
Previous state: Georgia	South Carolina	Next state: Terminus
