= South Carolina Highway 4 =

Highway in South Carolina

South Carolina Highway 4

Route information
- Maintained by SCDOT
- Length: 54.430 mi (87.597 km)

Major junctions
- West end: US 78 near Aiken
- SC 118 / SC 302 near Aiken; SC 302 / SC 394 near Salley; SC 3 Bus. / SC 39 in Springfield; SC 3 / SC 332 near Springfield; US 321 in Neeses; SC 400 near Edisto; US 301 / US 601 / SC 33 in Orangeburg
- East end: US 21 / US 21 Bus. near Orangeburg

Location
- Country: United States
- State: South Carolina
- Counties: Aiken, Orangeburg

Highway system
- South Carolina State Highway System; Interstate; US; State; Scenic
← SC 3	→ SC 5

South Carolina Highway 4 (SC 4) is a primary 54.430-mile-long (87.597 km) state highway in the southern part of the U.S. state of South Carolina. The highway connects Aiken and Orangeburg, via Springfield and Neeses.

== Route description ==
SC 4 begins at an intersection with U.S. Route 78 (US 78; Charleston Highway) southeast of Aiken. The route travels to the east-northeast and intersects US 78 Truck/SC 118/SC 302 (Rudy Mason Parkway). SC 4 and SC 302 form an approximately 12-mile-long (19 km) concurrency. They curve to the northeast and cross Shaw Creek. They curve to the east-southeast and curve back to the northeast before crossing the South Fork Edisto River and Cedar Creek. The two highways curve to the southeast and split north of Aiken State Park. SC 4 crosses over Burcalo Creek and then intersects SC 394 (Salley Road). It curves to the east-southeast and passes north of the Aiken Gopher Tortoise Heritage Preserve/Wildlife Management Area. It curves to the east-northeast and enters Orangeburg County.

SC 4 curves to the east-southeast and crosses Dean Swamp Creek. It curves to the southeast and enters Springfield. Right after entering the city limits, it curves to the south-southeast. It turns left onto SC 39 (Springfield Road). The two highways travel concurrently to the northeast for one block. One more block after that, it begins a concurrency with SC 3 Business. (SC 3 Bus.) They split three blocks later, with SC 4 heading south-southeast. It curves to the east-southeast and leaves Springfield. The highway immediately intersects SC 3 (Capital Way). It heads to the east and crosses Goodland Creek. It begins curving to the northeast and intersects SC 332 (Norway Road). The highway passes Rocky Swamp Cemetery and crosses Rocky Swamp Creek. It curves to the east-southeast and crosses Bolen Mill Creek before heading back to the northeast. It begins to curve to the east-southeast and enters Neeses. In Neeses, the route intersects US 321 (Savannah Highway). It heads east and passes Hickory Hill Cemetery, Pine Hill Cemetery, and Double Branch Cemetery before curving to the east-southeast. The highway crosses over Great Branch and curves to the southeast. Then, it crosses over Fourmile Creek and intersects the eastern terminus of SC 400 (Norway Road). SC 4 enters Edisto and curves to the east-southeast. It intersects US 301/US 601. The three highway travel concurrently to the east-northeast. They cross over the North Fork Edisto River, where they leave Edisto and enter Orangeburg. Immediately, they intersect the southern terminus of SC 33 (Russell Street). The concurrency intersects US 601 Truck. Here, SC 4 travels to the south-southeast, concurrent with US 601 Truck. They cross over some railroad tracks and pass by Southern Methodist College. The road curves around to the east-northeast and an intersection with US 21 and US 21 Bus. ends the state highway.

== Major intersections ==
County	Location	mi	km	Destinations	Notes
Aiken		0.000	0.000	US 78 (Wagener Road / Charleston Highway) – Williston, Augusta, Georgia	Western terminus
Aiken		0.180	0.290	US 78 Truck / SC 4 Truck east / SC 118 south / SC 302 west (Pine Log Road SE / Rudy Mason Parkway) to I-20 – Jackson	Western end of SC 302 concurrency; western terminus of SC 4 Truck; northern terminus of SC 118
Aiken		12.830	20.648	SC 302 east (Wagener Road) / SC 4 Truck west (State Park Road) – Wagener, Columbia, Aiken State Park, State Park Boat Landing	Eastern end of SC 302 concurrency; eastern terminus of SC 4 Truck
Aiken		13.920	22.402	SC 394 east (Salley Road) – Salley	Western terminus of SC 394
Orangeburg	Springfield	26.290	42.310	SC 39 south (Springfield Road) – Williston	Western end of SC 39 concurrency
Orangeburg	Springfield	26.380	42.454	SC 39 north (Festival Trail Road) – Salley	Eastern end of SC 39 concurrency
Orangeburg	Springfield	26.410	42.503	SC 3 Bus. south (Railroad Avenue) – Blackville	Western end of SC 3 Bus. concurrency
Orangeburg	Springfield	26.690	42.953	SC 3 Bus. north (Springfield Road)	Eastern end of SC 3 Bus. concurrency
Orangeburg		27.500	44.257	SC 3 (Capital Way) – Blackville	
Orangeburg		29.000	46.671	SC 332 east (Norway Road) – Norway	Western terminus of SC 332
Orangeburg	Neeses	36.640	58.966	US 321 (Savannah Highway) – Denmark, Columbia	
Orangeburg		49.230	79.228	SC 400 west (Norway Road) – Norway	Eastern terminus of SC 400
Orangeburg	Edisto	50.500	81.272	US 301 south / US 601 south (Bamberg Road)	Western end of US 301/US 601 concurrency
Orangeburg	Orangeburg	52.350	84.249	SC 33 north (Russell Street) – Cameron	Southern terminus of SC 33
Orangeburg	Orangeburg	52.520	84.523	US 301 north / US 601 north (Old Edisto Drive) / US 601 Truck north	Eastern end of US 301/US 601 concurrency; western end of US 601 Truck concurrency
Orangeburg		54.430	87.597	US 21 / US 21 Bus. north (Rowesville Road) – Branchville	Eastern end of US 601 Truck concurrency; eastern terminus of SC 4; southern terminus of US 21 Bus.
1.000 mi = 1.609 km; 1.000 km = 0.621 mi: Concurrency terminus

== Special routes ==
=== Aiken–Kitchings Mill truck route ===
South Carolina Highway 4 Truck
- Location: Aiken–Kitchings Mill, South Carolina
- Length: 17.500 mi (28.164 km)

South Carolina Highway 4 Truck (SC 4 Truck) is a truck route that extends from just east of Aiken to Windsor, via SC 118 and US 78, and then north-northeast to Kitchings Mill, via State Park Road, which it uses to traverse Aiken State Park.

The entire route is in Aiken County.

Location	mi	km	Destinations	Notes
	0.000	0.000	US 78 Truck west / SC 118 south (Rudy Mason Parkway) / SC 4 / SC 302 east (Wagener Road) to US 1 Truck	Western end of US 78 Truck/SC 302 concurrency; western terminus of SC 4 Truck; northern terminus of SC 118
	0.110	0.177	US 78 west (Charleston Highway) / US 78 Truck ends / SC 302 west (Pine Log Road NE)	Eastern end of US 78 Truck/SC 302 concurrency; western end of US 78 concurrency
Windsor	10.540	16.962	Middleton Drive North east (US 78 east)	Eastern end of US 78 concurrency
Kitchings Mill	17.500	28.164	SC 4 west / SC 302 west (Wagener Road) – Aiken SC 302 east (Wagener Road) – Wagener, Columbia SC 4 east (Salley Road) – Orangeburg	Eastern terminus of SC 4 Truck; northern terminus of State Park Road
1.000 mi = 1.609 km; 1.000 km = 0.621 mi: Concurrency terminus

=== Neeses alternate route ===
South Carolina Highway 4 Alternate
- Location: Neeses, South Carolina
- Existed: c. 1940–1947

South Carolina Highway 4 Alternate (SC 4 Alt.) was an alternate route that was commissioned around 1940 on Rice Street between SC 4 and a former portion of SC 5 in Neeses. This portion of SC 5 is now part of US 321.

=== Orangeburg alternate route ===
South Carolina Highway 4 Alternate
- Location: Orangeburg, South Carolina
- Existed: c. 1937–1947

South Carolina Highway 4 Alternate (SC 4 Alt.) was an alternate route in the eastern part of Orangeburg. It utilized Whitman Street between former portions of US 21 and SC 4. It was designated between 1935 and 1940, and was decommissioned in 1947. The portion of US 21 is now US 21 Business (US 21 Bus.), and the portion of SC 4 is now Five Chop Road.
