= South Carolina Highway 400 =

State highway in South Carolina, United States

South Carolina Highway 400

Route information
- Maintained by SCDOT
- Length: 12.440 mi (20.020 km)

Major junctions
- West end: US 321 / SC 332 in Norway
- East end: SC 4 near Edisto

Location
- Country: United States
- State: South Carolina
- Counties: Orangeburg

Highway system
- South Carolina State Highway System; Interstate; US; State; Scenic
← SC 395	→ US 401

South Carolina Highway 400 (SC 400) is a 12.440-mile-long (20.020 km) state highway in the U.S. state of South Carolina. The highway connects Norway with rural areas of Orangeburg County.

== Route description ==
SC 400 begins at an intersection with U.S. Route 321 (US 321) and SC 332 (Savannah Highway/Norway Road) in Norway, Orangeburg County. It travels to the east-southeast and leaves the town limits. The highway curves to the east-northeast and crosses over Deadfall Swamp, Roberts Swamp, and Twomile Swamp before entering Bolen Town. While there, it curves to a more easterly direction. SC 400 heads to the east-northeast again before it meets its eastern terminus, an intersection with SC 4 (Neeses Highway) at a point west of Edisto.

== Major intersections ==
The entire route is in Orangeburg County.

Location	mi	km	Destinations	Notes
Norway	0.000	0.000	US 321 (Savannah Highway) / SC 332 (Savannah Highway / Norway Road) – Denmark, Springfield, Columbia	Western terminus
	12.440	20.020	SC 4 (Neeses Highway) – Neeses, Orangeburg	Eastern terminus
1.000 mi = 1.609 km; 1.000 km = 0.621 mi
