= South Carolina Highway 37 =

State highway in South Carolina, United States

South Carolina Highway 37

Route information
- Maintained by SCDOT
- Length: 15.430 mi (24.832 km)
- Existed: 1922–present

Major junctions
- South end: US 278 near Barnwell
- US 78 in Elko
- North end: SC 39 near Springfield

Location
- Country: United States
- State: South Carolina
- Counties: Barnwell

Highway system
- South Carolina State Highway System; Interstate; US; State; Scenic
← SC 35	→ SC 38

South Carolina Highway 37 (SC 37) is a 15.430-mile (24.832 km) primary state highway in the U.S. state of South Carolina. It provides a direct route between Barnwell and Springfield.

== Route description ==
SC 37 is a two-lane rural highway that travels between U.S. Route 278 (US 278) and SC 39, with a connection with US 78 in Elko.

== History ==
SC 37 is an original state highway, established in 1922. Its original routing was from SC 1, in Barnwell, to SC 27, in Williston. In 1923, SC 37 was rerouted to Elko, leaving behind Williston Way (S-6-113). In 1940, SC 37 was extended in both directions: north to SC 39; south through Barnwell, in concurrency with SC 3, to the Barnwell-Allendale county line. By 1942, a separate section of SC 37 was established on primary routing from SC 73/SC 631, southeast of Allendale, to north of SC 28, in Baldock. By 1946, the two sections were combined, reaching its apex of nearly 40 miles (64 km) long. In 1948, SC 37 was truncated to US 78, in Elko; but in the following year, it was re-extended back to SC 39. In 1962 or 1963, SC 37 was truncated at its current southern terminus with SC 28, north of Barnwell; its former alignment south replaced by SC 3.

== Junction list ==
The entire highway is in Barnwell County.

Location	mi	km	Destinations	Notes
	0.000	0.000	US 278 – Barnwell, Augusta	Southern terminus
Elko	7.500	12.070	US 78 – Blackville, Williston	
	15.430	24.832	SC 39 – Springfield, Williston, Augusta	Northern terminus
1.000 mi = 1.609 km; 1.000 km = 0.621 mi
