= South Carolina Highway 332 =

Highway in South Carolina

South Carolina Highway 332

Route information
- Maintained by SCDOT
- Length: 18.070 mi (29.081 km)

Major junctions
- West end: SC 4 near Springfield
- US 321 / SC 400 in Norway
- East end: US 301 / US 601 near Cope

Location
- Country: United States
- State: South Carolina
- Counties: Orangeburg

Highway system
- South Carolina State Highway System; Interstate; US; State; Scenic
← SC 329	→ SC 333

South Carolina Highway 332 (SC 332) is a 18.070-mile (29.081 km) state highway in the U.S. state of South Carolina. The highway travels through mostly rural areas of Orangeburg County.

== Route description ==
SC 332 begins at an intersection with SC 4 (Neeses Highway) east of Springfield, within Orangeburg County. It travels to the south and immediately curves to the southeast. It crosses over Rocky Swamp Creek. It curves to the east-northeast and passes Hunter–Kinard–Tyler School. SC 332 curves to the southeast and to the east-southeast just before entering the city limits of Norway. It crosses over Willow Swamp and some railroad tracks before it intersects U.S. Route 321 (US 321; Savannah Highway) and the western terminus of SC 400 (Norway Road). US 321 and SC 332 travel concurrently to the southern part of the town, with SC 332 traveling to the east-southeast on Cope Road. It travels in a roughly southeastern direction to an intersection with SC 70 (Binnicker Bridge Road). Almost immediately, the highway crosses over Roberts Swamp. Just before entering Cope, it crosses over Sam Branch and some railroad tracks and curves to the northeast. In town, at the intersection with Slab Landing Road, the highway turns right to the south-southeast. It curves to the southeast just before meeting its eastern terminus, an intersection with US 301/US 601 (Bamberg Highway).

== Major intersections ==
The entire route is in Orangeburg County.

Location	mi	km	Destinations	Notes
	0.000	0.000	SC 4 (Neeses Highway) – Springfield, Orangeburg	Western terminus
Norway	7.770	12.505	US 321 north (Savannah Highway) / SC 400 east (Norway Road) – Neeses, Orangeburg	Western end of US 321 concurrency; western terminus of SC 400
Norway	8.050	12.955	US 321 south (Savannah Highway) – Denmark	Eastern end of US 321 concurrency
	14.970	24.092	SC 70 (Binnicker Bridge Road) – Denmark, Orangeburg	
	18.070	29.081	US 301 / US 601 (Bamberg Highway)	Eastern terminus
1.000 mi = 1.609 km; 1.000 km = 0.621 mi: Concurrency terminus
