= U.S. Route 301 in South Carolina =

Segment of American highway

U.S. Highway 301
- US 301 highlighted in red

Route information
- Auxiliary route of US 1
- Maintained by SCDOT
- Length: 189.704 mi (305.299 km)
- Existed: 1948–present

Major junctions
- South end: US 301 / SR 73 at the Georgia state line near Allendale
- US 278 in Allendale; US 321 in Ulmer; US 21 / US 601 in Orangeburg; I-26 near Orangeburg; US 176 near Elloree; I-95 / US 15 near Summerton; US 521 in Manning; US 378 in Turbeville; US 52 in Effingham; US 76 / SC 327 near Mars Bluff
- North end: I-95 / US 301 / US 501 at the North Carolina state line near Hamer

Location
- Country: United States
- State: South Carolina
- Counties: Allendale, Bamberg, Orangeburg, Clarendon, Florence, Marion, Dillon

Highway system
- United States Numbered Highway System; List; Special; Divided; South Carolina State Highway System; Interstate; US; State; Scenic
← SC 300	→ SC 302

U.S. Route 301 (US 301) is a 189.704-mile (305.299 km) U.S. Highway that travels north–south from the Savannah River southwest of Allendale to Hamer approaching the South of the Border roadside attraction complex.

== Route description ==
US 301 enters South Carolina over the Savannah River southwest of Allendale. In Allendale, it has a short Concurrency with US 278, which includes the crossing of the CSX Augusta Subdivision. Entering Ulmer, US 301 crosses the CSX Columbia Subdivision and joins another concurrency, this time with US 321 in and around Ulmer. In Bamberg, US 301 joins a concurrency with US 601 and both routes intersect US 78. North of Bamberg, US 301-601 pass over bridges over the South Fork of the Edisto River, then bypass Cope just before crossing the CSX Orangeburg Subdivision. As the two routes cross bridges over the North Fork of the Edisto River, they immediately enter Orangeburg, where they intersect another concurrency with US 21 and US 178. The concurrency with US 601 ends immediately after crossing the Norfolk Southern Railway Charleston District, then crosses the Orangeburg Subdivision again and later encounters an interchange with Interstate 26. Another noteworthy concurrency takes place with US 15 and shortly afterwards Interstate 95 (I-95) in Santee, at exit 97, before all three move across Lake Marion. The US 15-301 concurrency leaves I-95 at exit 102, running in close proximity to I-95, but US 15 breaks away at Summerton, remaining on Church Street while US 301 turns right onto Main Street, which becomes Alvin Hardin Highway. Other concurrencies include US 521 from Manning to Alcolu, US 378 in Turbeville, US 52 between Effingham and just south of Florence, US 76 eastbound from east of Florence until Pee Dee, and finally joins US 501 in Latta, where they both approach the South of the Border roadside attraction complex at the interchange with I-95 on the North–South Carolina border.

== History ==
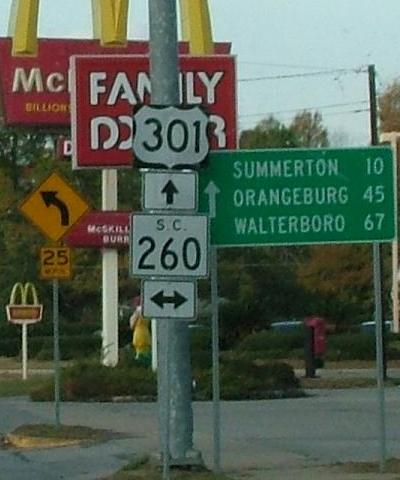
US 301 at the SC 260 intersection in Manning

US 301 was established in 1932 as a replacement of the piece of US 17-1 north of Wilson and the whole of US 217. Thus US 301 initially ran from US 17 (now US 76) at Pee Dee northeast through Dillon, South Carolina, into North Carolina, and Virginia, ending at U.S. Route 1 in Petersburg, Virginia. This entire route is now paralleled by I-95.

In 1935, US 301 was extended southwest to US 15 at Summerton. This extension took it west on US 76 (formerly US 17) to Florence and south on US 52 (also formerly US 17) to Effingham. There it split to the southwest, running along what had been SC 4 via Manning to Summerton. This again travels parallel to I-95.

In the late 1940s, US 301 was extended again, south all the way towards Tampa, Florida. On the way there from South Carolina it ran along US 15 southwest to Santee, South Carolina and replaced SC 4 west to Orangeburg. From Orangeburg, US 301 ran southwest with U.S. Route 601 to Bamberg, replaced SC 33 to Ulmer, replaced SC 508 to Allendale, and replaced SC 73 to the Georgia state line. When I-95 was built across Lake Marion in 1968, US 301 and 15 traveled parallel to it until they were relocated in a triple concurrency in 1987. In 2007, US 301 was rerouted on new 7.51-mile (12.09 km) bypass routing southeast of Florence.

=== U.S. Route 217 ===
U.S. Highway 217
- Location: Pee Dee, SC-NC state line
- Length: 24.4 mi (39.3 km)
- Existed: 1927–1932

U.S. Route 217 (US 217) was an original U.S. Highway, established in 1927. A renumbering of SC 23, it traversed from US 17, in Pee Dee, north through Latta and Dillon before entering North Carolina. In 1932, the entire route was renumbered as US 301.

== Major intersections ==
County	Location	mi	km	Exit	Destinations	Notes
Savannah River		0.000	0.000		US 301 south (SR 73 south) – Sylvania	Continuation into Georgia
Savannah River		0.000	0.000		Burtons Ferry Bridge	
Allendale		5.680	9.141		SC 3 (River Road) – Estill, Barnwell	
Allendale	Allendale	12.890	20.744		US 278 east / SC 125 north – Hampton, Savannah River Site, Augusta	Southern end of US 278 concurrency; southern terminus of SC 125
Allendale	Allendale	13.200	21.243		US 278 west (Barnwell Road) – Barnwell	Northern end of US 278 concurrency
Allendale		14.340	23.078		SC 641 east (Confederate Highway) – Walterboro	Western terminus of SC 641
Allendale	Ulmer	21.420	34.472		SC 300 north – Barnwell	Southern terminus of SC 300
Allendale	Ulmer	21.960	35.341		US 321 south – Fairfax, Savannah	Southern end of US 321 concurrency
Salkehatchie River					Bufords Bridge	
Bamberg		23.860	38.399		US 321 north (Carolina Highway) – Olar, Denmark, Columbia	Northern end of US 321 concurrency
Bamberg		26.540	42.712		SC 64 east (Lowcountry Highway) – Ehrhardt, Walterboro	Southern end of SC 64 concurrency
Bamberg		26.800	43.130		SC 64 west (Lowcountry Highway) – Olar	Northern end of SC 64 concurrency; to Cathedral Bay Heritage Preserve
Bamberg	Bamberg	38.740	62.346		US 601 south (Broxton Bridge Road) – Hampton	Southern end of US 601 concurrency
Bamberg	Bamberg	39.620	63.762		US 78 – Denmark, Branchville	
South Edisto River					Bridge	
Orangeburg		45.280	72.871		SC 332 west (Slab Landing Road) – Cope, Norway	Eastern terminus of SC 332
Orangeburg		52.060	83.782		SC 70 west (Binnicker Bridge Road) – Denmark, Barnwell	Eastern terminus of SC 70
Orangeburg	Edisto	55.140	88.739		SC 4 west (Neeses Road) – Neeses	Southern end of SC 4 concurrency
Orangeburg	Orangeburg	56.990	91.717		SC 33 north (Russell Street)	Southern terminus of SC 33
Orangeburg	Orangeburg	57.160	91.990		US 601 Truck north / SC 4 east (Stonewall Jackson Street) / Riverside Drive north – Orangeburg National Fish Hatchery, Airport, Orangeburg Arts Center	Northern end of SC 4 concurrency; southern terminus of US 601 Truck
Orangeburg	Orangeburg	57.610	92.714		US 178 Bus. (Broughton Street) – North, Bowman	
Orangeburg	Orangeburg	58.170	93.616		US 601 north / US 21 Bus. (Magnolia Street) – Charleston, St. Matthews, Columbia	Northern end of US 601 concurrency; to Fairgrounds
Orangeburg	Orangeburg	59.600	95.917		US 21 / US 178 / US 601 Truck (Joe S. Jeffords Highway) – Charleston, North, Columbia	
Orangeburg		65.910	106.072		I-26 – Charleston, Columbia	I-26 exits 154 A-B
Orangeburg		72.040	115.937		US 176 (Old State Road) – Holly Hill, Cameron	
Orangeburg		72.560	116.774		SC 47 east (Cleveland Street) – Elloree	Western terminus of SC 47; to Santee State Park
Orangeburg		78.020	125.561		SC 267 (Tee Vee Road) – Holly Hill, Elloree	
Orangeburg		79.620	128.136		US 15 south / US 15 Conn. north (Bass Drive) – St. George, Santee, Santee State Park	Southern end of US 15 concurrency; southern terminus of US 15 Conn.; SCHP Patrolman Harry B. Ray Memorial Intersection
Orangeburg		80.608– 80.947	129.726– 130.272		I-95 south / Five Chop Road east (SC 6 Conn. east) – Savannah	Southern end of I-95 concurrency; western terminus of SC 6 Conn. and Five Chop Road; I-95 exit 97; northbound exit and southbound entrance
Orangeburg		82.632	132.983	98	SC 6 – Eutawville, Santee, Elloree	Exit number follows I-95
Lake Marion		84.442– 84.448	135.896– 135.906	Williams James Gooding Bridge		
Clarendon		86.273– 86.312	138.843– 138.906		I-95 north – Florence	Northern end of I-95 concurrency; I-95 exit 102; northbound entrance and southbound exit
Clarendon	Summerton	93.712	150.815		US 15 north (Church Street) – Sumter	Northern end of US 15 concurrency
Clarendon	Summerton	93.777	150.919		Railroad Avenue west (US 15 Conn. north)	Southern terminus of US 15 Conn.; eastern terminus of Railroad Avenue
Clarendon		99.162	159.586		I-95 – Savannah, Florence	I-95 exit 115
Clarendon	Manning	103.872	167.166		SC 260 (Mill Street) – Jordan	To Santee Dam
Clarendon	Manning	104.222	167.729		SC 261 (Boyce Street) to US 521 – Kingstree, Georgetown, Columbia	
Clarendon	Manning	104.962	168.920		US 521 south (Church Street) – Georgetown	Southern end of US 521 concurrency
Clarendon		106.282	171.044		US 521 north – Sumter	Northern end of US 521 concurrency
Clarendon		107.822	173.523		Trinity Church Road west (US 301 Conn. north) – Alcolu	Southern terminus of US 301 Conn.; eastern terminus of Trinity Church Road
Clarendon	Sardinia	116.382	187.299		SC 527 (Black River Road) – Kingstree, Sumter	
Clarendon	Turbeville	122.302	196.826		US 378 west (Clarence Coker Highway) – Sumter	Southern end of US 378 concurrency
Clarendon	Turbeville	122.402	196.987		SC 58 north (Gamble Street) – Lynchburg, Bishopville	Southern terminus of SC 58
Clarendon	Turbeville	123.022	197.985		US 378 east – Lake City, Conway, Myrtle Beach	Northern end of US 378 concurrency
Florence	Olanta	128.752	207.206		SC 341 (Hampton Street) – Lake City, Lynchburg, Timmonsville, Bishopville	To Woods Bay State Natural Area
Florence	Kelley Crossroads	132.122	212.630		SC 403 (Bethel Road) – Lake City	
Florence	Effingham	142.772	229.769		US 52 south / SC 327 north – Lake City	Southern end of US 52 concurrency; southern terminus of SC 327
Florence	Florence	148.622	239.184		US 52 north / US 52 Truck begins – Florence	Northern end of US 52 concurrency; southern end of US 52 Truck concurrency; southern terminus of US 52 Truck
Florence	Florence	149.892	241.228		US 52 Truck north (South Church Street) to US 52 – Darlington	Northern end of US 52 Truck concurrency
Florence	Florence	150.162	241.662		SC 51 (Pamplico Highway) – Pamplico	
Florence		156.112	251.238		US 76 west (Marion Highway) / SC 327 north (Williston Road) to I-20 / I-95 – Florence	Southern end of US 76/SC 327 concurrency
Florence	Mars Bluff	157.802	253.958		SC 327 south (Francis Marion Road) – Pamplico	Southern end of SC 327 concurrency
Great Pee Dee River					David Walker Harwell Bridge	
Marion	Pee Dee	164.942	265.448		US 76 east – Marion, Myrtle Beach	Partial interchange; northern end of US 76 concurrency
Dillon		173.102– 173.122	278.581– 278.613		SC 38 – Marion, Bennettsville	Interchange
Dillon	Latta	175.425	282.319		US 501 south – Marion, Myrtle Beach	Southern end of US 501 concurrency
Dillon	Latta	176.184	283.541		SC 917 (Main Street) – Mullins, Bennettsville	
Dillon	Dillon	182.764	294.130		SC 9 south / SC 34 west / SC 57 south (Main Street) – Lake View, North Myrtle Beach	Southern end of SC 9/SC 57 concurrency; eastern terminus of SC 34
Dillon	Dillon	183.704	295.643		SC 9 north / SC 57 north (Radford Boulevard) – Bennettsville, Charlotte	Northern end of SC 9/SC 57 concurrency
South Carolina–North Carolina line		189.704	305.299		I-95 – Florence, Fayetteville, Lumberton	I-95 exit 1
South Carolina–North Carolina line		189.704	305.299		US 301 north / US 501 north	Continuation into North Carolina
1.000 mi = 1.609 km; 1.000 km = 0.621 mi: Concurrency terminus

== See also ==
- Special routes of U.S. Route 301

U.S. Route 301
Previous state: Georgia	South Carolina	Next state: North Carolina
