= South Carolina Highway 3 =

State highway in South Carolina

South Carolina Highway 3

- South Carolina Highway 3 highlighted in red

Route information
- Maintained by SCDOT
- Length: 96.310 mi (154.996 km)

Major junctions
- South end: US 278 near Varnville
- US 601 near Estill; US 321 in Estill; US 301 near Allendale; US 278 near Barnwell; US 278 / SC 64 / SC 70 in Barnwell; US 78 in Blackville; SC 4 near Springfield; US 178 near North
- North end: US 321 in Swansea

Location
- Country: United States
- State: South Carolina
- Counties: Jasper, Hampton, Allendale, Barnwell, Orangeburg, Lexington

Highway system
- South Carolina State Highway System; Interstate; US; State; Scenic
← SC 2	→ SC 4

South Carolina Highway 3 (SC 3) is a 96.310-mile (154.996 km) state highway in the southern part of the U.S. state of South Carolina. The highway travels in a C-shape from a point approximately 11 miles (18 km) southeast of Varnville northwest and north to Barnwell, and then northeast to Swansea.

== Route description ==
SC 3 begins at an intersection with U.S. Route 278 (US 278) in rural Jasper County. The route heads northwest, and crosses into Hampton County. Continuing northwest, it intersects US 601 before a brief concurrency with US 321 in Estill. The highway continues northwest into Allendale County. After crossing into the county, SC 3 turns north and intersects US 301 approximately seven miles (11 km) southwest of Allendale. The route continues north until it enters Barnwell County.

Just after the county line, SC 3 turns northeast and intersects US 278 just before the Salkehatchie River, approximately two miles (3.2 km) south of Barnwell. US 278/SC 3 form a concurrency into Barnwell. In town, SC 3 splits off to the northeast, intersecting SC 64 and SC 70. The highway heads northeast to Blackville, where it crosses US 78. It then heads northward, crossing the South Fork of the Edisto River, where it enters Orangeburg County. Just before the river, the route begins its last northeastern orientation, passing just east of Springfield, intersecting SC 3 Business and SC 4. SC 3 heads northeast, skirting the Aiken County line, before entering Lexington County. Approximately seven miles (11 km) northeast of the county line, SC 3 meets its northern terminus, at its second intersection with US 321 in the southern part of Swansea.

== History ==
A previous version of SC 3 existed as an original state route, running from Columbia to Sumter, Florence, and Mullins before crossing the North Carolina state line where US 76 does today. In 1927, the route was renumbered as various US highways.

The current version of SC 3 was established in 1928 as a renumbering of the closing SC 1. It originally ran from Allendale to Dixiana.

In 1938, the northern terminus was extended about 3 miles north to West Columbia. In 1939, however, it was pushed back south to Dixiana. In that same year, the southern terminus was extended southward a short distance to Barton. In 1948, the northern terminus was again pushed back, this time to Swansea. The southern terminus was also pushed north back to Allendale. Five years later, in 1953, the southern terminus was moved up north to Barnwell.

In the early 1960s, the northern terminus was extended up to Dixiana once again. In 1962, the highway was extended southward to US 321 in southwest Allendale County. In 1971, the northern terminus was once again moved back south to Swansea. In 1972, the southern terminus was moved southeast to Grays, giving us the current SC 3 routing.

== Major intersections ==
County	Location	mi	km	Destinations	Notes
Jasper	Grays	0.000	0.000	US 278 (Grays Highway) – Ridgeland, Hilton Head	Southern terminus
Hampton		11.790	18.974	US 601 (Savannah Highway) – Furman, Hampton	
Hampton	Estill	15.060	24.237	US 321 (Columbia Highway)	Southern end of US 321 concurrency
Hampton	Estill	15.320	24.655	US 321 (Columbia Highway) – Columbia	Northern end of US 321 concurrency
Allendale		36.240	58.323	US 301 (Burton's Ferry Highway) – Sylvania (GA), Allendale	
Allendale		43.280	69.652	SC 125 (Augusta Highway) – Savannah (GA), Savannah River Plant, Allendale	
Barnwell		54.150	87.146	US 278	Southern end of US 278 concurrency
Barnwell	Barnwell	55.390	89.142	US 278 (Jackson Street) – Aiken, Augusta (GA)	Northern end of US 278 concurrency
Barnwell	Barnwell	56.390	90.751	SC 64 (Patterson Street)	
Barnwell	Barnwell	57.050	91.813	SC 70 (Main Street) – Savannah River Site, Denmark	
Barnwell	Blackville	66.730	107.392	US 78 (Dexter Street) – Williston, Denmark	
Barnwell	Blackville	66.840– 66.860	107.569– 107.601	US 78 Bus. (Main Street) – Denmark	
Orangeburg		75.710	121.843	SC 3 Bus. (Railroad Avenue) – Springfield	Southern terminus of SC 3 Bus.
Orangeburg		76.760	123.533	SC 4 (Neeses Highway) – Springfield, Neeses	
Orangeburg		77.810	125.223	SC 3 Bus. (Springfield Road)	Northern terminus of SC 3 Bus.
Orangeburg		83.920	135.056	SC 389 (Ninety 6 Road) – Saluda	
Orangeburg		84.696	136.305	SC 394 (Salley Road) – North	
Lexington		89.640	144.262	US 178 (Main Street) / North Road	
Lexington	Swansea	96.310	154.996	US 321 (Savannah Highway) – Columbia	Northern terminus
1.000 mi = 1.609 km; 1.000 km = 0.621 mi: Concurrency terminus

== Springfield business route ==
South Carolina Highway 3 Business
- Location: Springfield
- Length: 2.870 mi (4.619 km)

South Carolina Highway 3 Business (SC 3 Bus.) begins at an intersection with the SC 3 mainline, south-southeast of Springfield. It heads northwest into the city, along Railroad Avenue, to an intersection with SC 4. The two highways share a very brief concurrency to the northeast in town. SC 3 Bus. continues northeast until it meets its northern terminus, another intersection with SC 3, northeast of Springfield.

The entire route is in Orangeburg County.

Location	mi	km	Destinations	Notes
	0.000	0.000	SC 3 (Capital Way) – Blackville, Swansea	Southern terminus
Springfield	1.460	2.350	SC 4 (Springfield Road) – Aiken	Southern end of SC 4 concurrency
Springfield	1.740	2.800	SC 4 (Neeses Highway) – Neeses	Northern end of SC 4 concurrency
	2.870	4.619	SC 3 (Capital Way) – Blackville, Swansea	Northern terminus
1.000 mi = 1.609 km; 1.000 km = 0.621 mi: Concurrency terminus
