= C. W. Caldwell =

American politician from South Carolina

Member of the South Carolina House of Representatives

Personal details
- Born: Christian Wesley Caldwell

Christian Wesley Caldwell (18 July 1839 in Orangeburg County, South Carolina – 21 November 1921 in Columbia, South Carolina) was an American politician who served as an elected member of the South Carolina House of Representatives during the Reconstruction era. He represented Orangeburg County.
