= South Carolina Highway 302 =

State highway in South Carolina

South Carolina Highway 302

Route information
- Maintained by SCDOT
- Length: 66.200 mi (106.539 km)
- Existed: 1973–present

Major junctions
- West end: SC 125 near Jackson
- US 278 in Hollow Creek; US 78 / SC 118 near Aiken; US 178 in Pelion; I-26 in Springdale
- East end: US 21 / US 176 / US 321 in West Columbia

Location
- Country: United States
- State: South Carolina
- Counties: Aiken, Lexington

Highway system
- South Carolina State Highway System; Interstate; US; State; Scenic
| ← US 301 | → SC 303 |

South Carolina Highway 302 (SC 302) is a 66.200-mile-long (106.539 km) state highway in the U.S. state of South Carolina. The highway travels through mostly rural areas of Aiken and Lexington counties and connects the Aiken with the Columbia metropolitan areas, via Wagener and Pelion.

== Route description ==
SC 302 begins at an intersection with SC 125 (Atomic Road) south of Spiderweb, within Aiken County, where the roadway continues as Silver Bluff Road. It travels to the northeast and crosses over Long Branch and Town Creek. It then intersects U.S. Route 278 (US 278; Williston Road). The highway curves to the north-northeast. It passes east of Boyd Pond Park. The highway enters Aiken and turns right onto SC 19 Truck/SC 302 (Hitchcock Parkway). The three highways travel concurrently to the east-northeast. Just south of Virginia Acres Park, they intersect SC 19 (Whiskey Road). At this intersection, SC 19 Truck meets its southern terminus. SC 118/SC 302 travel to the northeast and go between Kennedy Middle School and Millbrook Elementary School. They pass Citizens Park and leave the city limits of Aiken before they curve to the north-northeast. After crossing some railroad tracks, they intersect US 78 (Charleston Highway). At this intersection, US 78 Truck, which begins here, joins the concurrency. One block later, they intersect SC 4 (Wagener Road). SC 302 turns right, and both highways travel to the east-northeast. They curve to the northeast. They cross over Shaw Creek just before curving to the east-southeast. Then, they curve back to the northeast. They cross the South Fork Edisto River and Cedar Creek. The two highways curve to the southeast and split north of Aiken State Park. SC 302 heads to the northeast and crosses over Burcalo Creek. Then, it crosses over Dean Swamp Creek and curves to the east-northeast and enters Wagener. Just northeast of Wagener–Salley High School, it intersects SC 113 (Main Street South). They travel concurrently to the northeast through town. The concurrency intersects SC 39 (Railroad Street). Just over 1,000 feet (300 m) later, SC 113 and SC 302 split, with SC 302 heading to the east-northeast. The highway passes just south of Edisto Lake and travels through Berlin. Then, it crosses over the Edisto River on the Harsey's Bridge. This bridge marks the Lexington County line.

SC 302 curves to the north-northeast. It passes west of Rast Pond just before entering Pelion. It passes Pelion Elementary School and Pelion Middle School before intersecting US 178 (Main Street). Just after leaving the city limits, it passes Fort Pond Elementary School. Then, the highway travels through Macedon. It has a concurrency with SC 6. They split in Edmund. SC 302 curves to the northeast and enters South Congaree, where it crosses Congaree Creek. After it leaves the city limits, it travels along the eastern edge of Columbia Metropolitan Airport and crosses Savana Branch. It travels along the western edge of Cayce and passes Airport High School. At Boston Avenue, east of the high school, it begins traveling along the Springdale–Cayce line. While along the line, it crosses over Sixmile Creek and has an interchange with Interstate 26 (I-26). At Manley Street, it begins traveling along the West Columbia–Cayce line. Glenn Street marks the point where the highway enters West Columbia proper. Just over 1,000 feet (300 m) later, it meets its eastern terminus, an intersection with US 21/US 176/US 321 (Charleston Highway).

== History ==
On September 19, 2008, a Learjet 60 crossed the highway and crashed after a maintenance error. It crashed through the airport boundary fence then coming to rest onto an embankment near 2860 Edmund Highway, killing four people. Two survived the crash.

=== South Carolina Highway 106 ===
South Carolina Highway 106
- Location: Kathwood–Aiken, South Carolina
- Existed: 1940–1947

South Carolina Highway 106 (SC 106) was a state highway that was established in 1940 on a path from U.S. Route 1 (US 1) in Aiken northeast to SC 391 (now New Holland Road). In 1942, its southern terminus was extended with US 1 and SC 19 through Aiken, then by itself to end in Kathwood, which is just northwest of Jackson. In 1947, the highway was decommissioned. Approximately half of its path was downgraded to secondary roads: Silver Bluff Road, Hampton Avenue, Camellia Street, Wire Road, and Cooks Bridge Road. The rest of its path was redesignated as SC 302.

== Major intersections ==
| County | Location | mi | km | Destinations | Notes |
|---|---|---|---|---|---|
| Aiken | | 0.000 | 0.000 | SC 125 (Atomic Road) / Silver Bluff Road west – North Augusta, Jackson, Savannah River Site | Western terminus; Silver Bluff Road continues past terminus. |
| Aiken | | 3.210 | 5.166 | US 278 (Williston Road) – Beech Island, New Ellenton | |
| Aiken | Aiken | 12.110 | 19.489 | SC 19 Truck north / SC 118 north (Pine Log Road SW) | Western end of SC 19 Truck concurrency; official southern terminus of SC 118 |
| Aiken | Aiken | 12.510 | 20.133 | SC 19 (Whiskey Road SE) – Savannah River Site, New Ellenton, Aiken | Southern terminus of SC 19 Truck; eastern end of SC 19 Truck concurrency |
| Aiken | | 15.420 | 24.816 | US 78 (Charleston Highway) | Western end of US 1 Truck/US 78 Truck and SC 4 Truck concurrencies; southern terminus of US 1 Truck; eastern terminus of US 78 Truck |
| Aiken | | 15.530 | 24.993 | US 1 Truck north / US 78 Truck west / SC 118 south (Rudy Mason Parkway) / SC 4 Truck ends / SC 4 west to I-20 | Eastern end of US 1 Truck/US 78 Truck, SC 4 Truck, and SC 118 concurrencies; western end of SC 4 concurrency; western terminus of SC 4 Truck; northern terminus of SC 118 |
| Aiken | Kitchings Mill | 28.180 | 45.351 | SC 4 east (Salley Road) / SC 4 Truck west (State Park Road) – Orangeburg, Aiken State Park, State Park Boat Landing | Eastern end of SC 4 concurrency; eastern terminus of SC 4 Truck |
| Aiken | Wagener | 36.700 | 59.063 | SC 113 south (Main Street South) | Eastern end of SC 113 concurrency |
| Aiken | Wagener | | | SC 39 (Railroad Street) to I-20 – Orangeburg, Monetta | |
| Aiken | Wagener | 37.060 | 59.642 | SC 113 north (Sand Dam Road) – Batesburg | Eastern end of SC 113 concurrency |
| Lexington | Pelion | 48.240 | 77.635 | US 178 (Main Street) – Batesburg, North | |
| Lexington | | 53.870 | 86.695 | SC 6 east – Swansea | Western end of SC 6 concurrency |
| Lexington | Edmund | 55.470 | 89.270 | SC 6 west – Lexington | Eastern end of SC 6 concurrency |
| Lexington | Springdale | 64.850 | 104.366 | I-26 – Charleston, Spartanburg | I-26 exit 113 |
| Lexington | West Columbia | 66.200 | 106.539 | US 21 / US 176 / US 321 (Charleston Highway) | Eastern terminus |
1.000 mi = 1.609 km; 1.000 km = 0.621 mi: Concurrency terminus
