= Springfield High School (South Carolina) =

- U.S. National Register of Historic Places
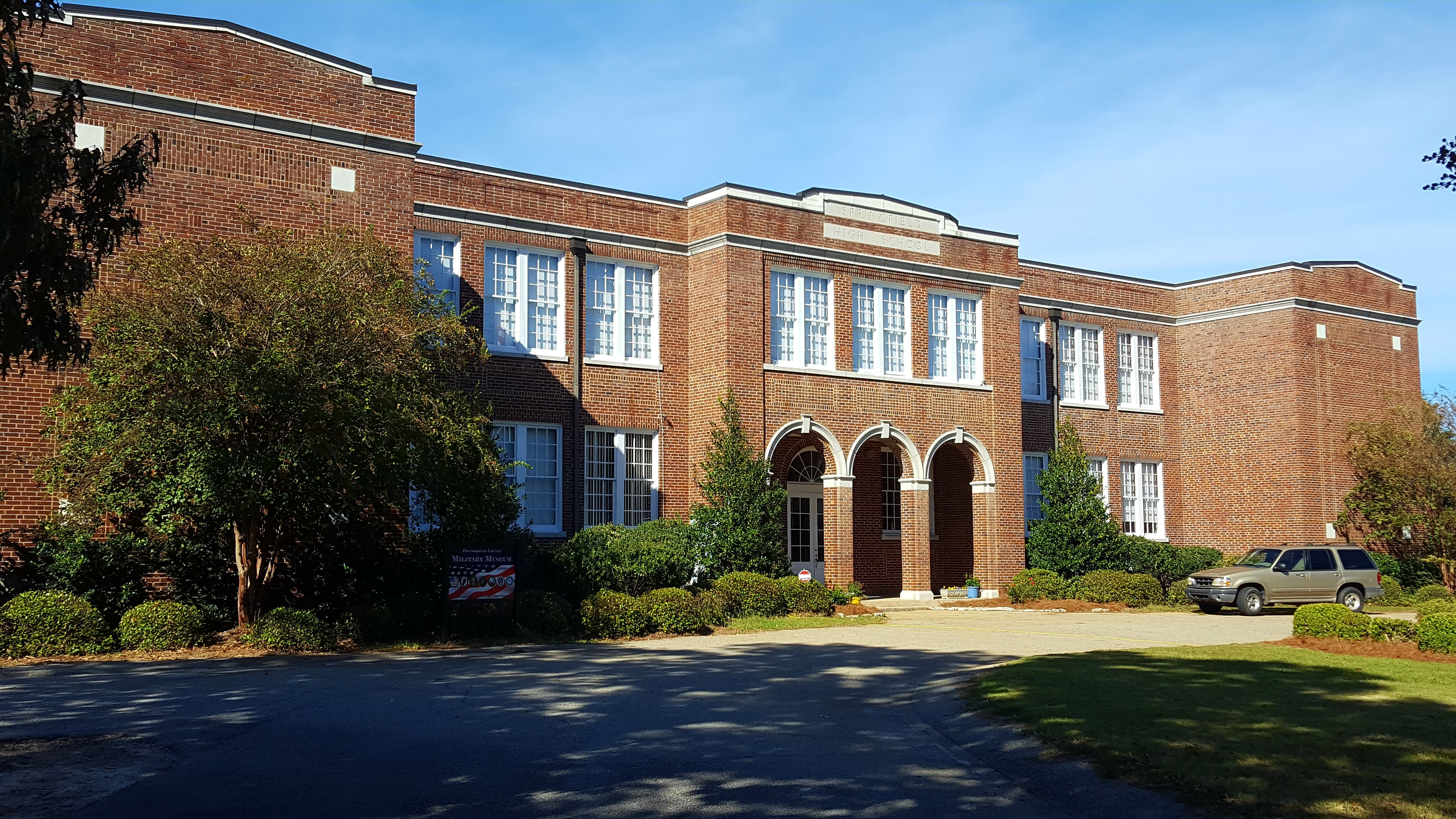

- Location within South Carolina Location within the United States
- Location: Brodie St., bet. SC 4 and Georgia St., Springfield, South Carolina
- Coordinates: 33°29′44″N 81°16′27″W
- Area: 6.2 acres (2.5 ha)
- Built: 1928-1929
- Built by: Dabbs, J.T.
- Architect: Urquhart, James Burwell
- Architectural style: Late 19th And 20th Century Revivals
- NRHP reference No.: 01000313
- Added to NRHP: March 29, 2001

Springfield High School is a historic high school complex located at Springfield, Orangeburg County, South Carolina. It was built in 1928–1929, and is a two-story, brick high school building with a projecting central and end pavilions. Also on the property are the contributing gymnasium building (1938) and Springfield Graded School Annex (c. 1927).

It was added to the National Register of Historic Places in 2001.
