= Edisto (disambiguation) =

Edisto Island is one of the Sea Islands in South Carolina.

Edisto may also refer to:

- Edisto, Orangeburg County, South Carolina, an unincorporated community
- Edisto Beach, South Carolina, a town
- Edisto River, a river in South Carolina
- Edisto people, a subgroup of the Cusabo people of South Carolina
