= South Carolina Highway 19 =

State highway in South Carolina

South Carolina Highway 19

Route information
- Maintained by SCDOT
- Length: 28.750 mi (46.269 km)
- Existed: 1922–present

Major junctions
- South end: Savannah River Site
- US 278 in New Ellenton; US 1 / US 78 in Aiken; I-20 near Aiken
- North end: US 25 / SC 121 in Trenton

Location
- Country: United States
- State: South Carolina
- Counties: Aiken, Edgefield

Highway system
- South Carolina State Highway System; Interstate; US; State; Scenic
← SC 18	→ I-20

South Carolina Highway 19 (SC 19) is a 28.750-mile (46.269 km) primary state highway in the U.S. state of South Carolina. It connects Aiken directly with the Savannah River Site and Edgefield via U.S. Route 25 (US 25).

== Route description ==
SC 19 operates as arterial four-lane highway from Aiken to the Savannah River Site; to its north, it is a two-lane rural highway to Trenton, where it connects with US 25 and SC 121. In Aiken's downtown area, SC 19 is signed, northbound along Chesterfield Street and Richland Avenue (on state maps, it is officially SC 19 Connector); while SC 19 southbound travels along Laurens Street/Park Avenue onto Chesterfield Street.

== History ==
SC 19 is an original state highway, established in 1922. Its original routing was from SC 2 in Newberry, north through Whitmire, Union, Spartanburg, Inman and Landrum, to the North Carolina state line continuing as NC 19. In 1923, it was extended south on new primary routing, through Saluda, to SC 21/SC 27 in Trenton. In 1927, US 176 was assigned to SC 19 from Newberry to the North Carolina state line; the following year it was removed from the overlap. Also in 1928, SC 19 was extended south, replacing part of SC 27 to US 1/US 78 in Aiken. In 1929 or 1930, SC 19 was extended south (again) to SC 28 north of Ellenton.

Around 1952, the Savannah River Site was established; which removed nine miles (14 km) of highway in what is now a restricted area. By 1955, SC 19 was widened to four-lanes between the Savannah River Site and Aiken. In 1964, SC 19 was truncated to its current northern terminus at Trenton; its routing north to Saluda was replaced by SC 121.

== Major intersections ==
County	Location	mi	km	Destinations	Notes
Aiken	Savannah River Site	0.000	0.000	SRS Road 2 south – Savannah River Ecology Laboratory, United States Department of Energy, Savannah River Laboratory	Southern terminus; roadway continues as SRS Road 2; gate entrance .3-mile (0.48 km) south, restricted access
Aiken	Savannah River Site	0.091	0.146	SRS Road 1 south – Savannah River Forest Station	Northern terminus of SRS Road 1
Aiken	New Ellenton	0.500	0.805	US 278 – Williston, Augusta	
Aiken	Aiken	9.970	16.045	SC 19 Truck north / SC 118 north / SC 302 (Pine Log Road) to US 1 / US 78 – Beech Island	Southern terminus of SC 19 Truck and SC 118; provides access to Aiken Medical Center
Aiken	Aiken	12.490	20.101	SC 19 Conn. (Chesterfield Street)	Signed as northbound SC 19, which is also concurrent with US 1/US 78
Aiken	Aiken	12.840	20.664	US 1 (Richland Avenue) / US 78 – Columbia, Augusta	
Aiken	Aiken	14.180	22.820	US 1 Truck / US 78 Truck / SC 19 Truck south / SC 118 (University Parkway west / Rutland Drive east) – Williston, USC Aiken Campus, Aiken Technical College, Aiken High School	Northern terminus of SC 19 Truck; provides access to Aiken Regional Medical Center
Aiken		18.510	29.789	I-20 – Columbia, Augusta	I-20 exit 18
Aiken		19.430	31.270	SC 191 south (Old Graniteville Highway) – Vaucluse, Graniteville	Southern end of SC 191 concurrency
Aiken	Eureka	22.550	36.291	SC 191 north (Johnston Highway) – Johnston	Northern end of SC 191 concurrency
Edgefield	Trenton	27.700	44.579	Greenhouse Road south / S.E. Diggs Road north (SC 19 Conn. north) – Trenton, Trenton Municipal Airport, Douglas Elementary School, South Carolina Forestry Commission, Taylor Nursery	Northern terminus of Greenhouse Road; southern terminus of SC 19 Conn. and S.E. Diggs Road
Edgefield	Trenton	28.750	46.269	US 25 / SC 121 – Trenton, Johnston, North Augusta, Edgefield	Northern terminus
1.000 mi = 1.609 km; 1.000 km = 0.621 mi: Concurrency terminus

== Special routes ==
=== Aiken truck route ===
South Carolina Highway 19 Truck
- Location: Aiken, South Carolina
- Length: 9.880 mi (15.900 km)

South Carolina Highway 19 Truck (SC 19 Truck) is a 9.880-mile (15.900 km) truck route that provides routing west around downtown Aiken, via SC 118, for trucks; which are not allowed in the downtown area.

=== Aiken connector ===
South Carolina Highway 19 Connector
- Location: Aiken, South Carolina
- Length: 0.130 mi (209 m)

South Carolina Highway 19 Connector (SC 19 Conn.) is a short 0.130 miles (0.209 km) hidden connector route, which is signed as northbound SC 19, between Park Avenue and Richland Avenue. Northbound SC 19 continue northbound along Richland Avenue to reconnect southbound SC 19 at Laurens Avenue.

=== Trenton alternate route ===
South Carolina Highway 19 Alternate
- Location: Trenton, South Carolina
- Existed: 1939–c.1966

South Carolina Highway 19 Alternate (SC 19 Alt.) was an alternate route that partially existed within the city limits of Trenton. In 1939, its southern terminus was established at U.S. Route 25 (US 25) south-southwest of the town. It then traveled northeast across the mainline's path, on Greenhouse Road and S.E. Diggs Road. At the intersection with East Wise Street, it turned left and traveled to the northwest. Just before an intersection with the southern terminus of Thurmond Street, it began a curve to the west-northwest. At Watson Street, it turned to the right and traveled to the north-northwest. At Church Street, it turned left and resumed its west-northwest direction. It continued on Church Street until it ended at another intersection with SC 19, which existed north of the town at the time. In 1947, the southern terminus was truncated to end at its southern intersection with the mainline, removing it from Greenhouse Road. In the mid-1950s, the portion on Watson and Church streets was removed, with the alternate route using the entire length of Wise Street. Between 1965 and 1967, it was decommissioned and redesignated as SC 19 Conn. and SC 121 Conn.

The entire route was in Edgefield County.

Location	mi	km	Destinations	Notes
			US 25	Southern terminus; now also part of SC 121
			SC 19	
Trenton			SC 19	Northern terminus; now SC 121
1.000 mi = 1.609 km; 1.000 km = 0.621 mi

=== Trenton connector ===
South Carolina Highway 19 Connector
- Location: Trenton, South Carolina
- Length: 2.040 mi (3.283 km)

South Carolina Highway 19 Connector (SC 19 Conn.) is a 2.040-mile (3.283 km) unsigned connector route through Trenton, via Samuel E. Diggs Road and Wise Street. Sharing a concurrency with SC 121 Conn, it has appeared on official state maps since the 1930s (possibly earlier). The routing provides a primary routing through the center of Trenton.

== See also ==
- Central Savannah River Area
