= South Carolina Highway 781 =

State highway in South Carolina, United States

South Carolina Highway 781
- Tinker Creek Road

Route information
- Maintained by SCDOT
- Length: 3.561 mi (5.731 km)
- Existed: 1940–present

Major junctions
- West end: US 278 near the Savannah River Site
- East end: US 78 near White Pond

Location
- Country: United States
- State: South Carolina
- Counties: Aiken

Highway system
- South Carolina State Highway System; Interstate; US; State; Scenic
← SC 773	→ SC 802

South Carolina Highway 781 (SC 781) is a 3.561-mile (5.731 km) primary state highway in the U.S. state of South Carolina. It is used as part of a bypass south of Aiken, between Augusta and Williston, in conjunction with U.S. Route 278 (US 278).

== Route description ==
SC 781 is a two-lane rural connector highway between US 278 and US 78.

== History ==
Established in 1940 as a new primary route, it traversed from SC 28 in Beech Island east to US 78 west of Williston. In 1953, SC 781 was truncated to its current western terminus, replaced by a rerouted SC 28 (later became US 278 in 1965).

== Major intersections ==
The entire highway is in Aiken County.

Location	mi	km	Destinations	Notes
	0.000	0.000	US 278 – New Ellenton, Augusta, Barnwell	Western terminus
White Pond	3.561	5.731	US 78 – Williston, Denmark, Charleston, Aiken	Eastern terminus
1.000 mi = 1.609 km; 1.000 km = 0.621 mi
