= South Carolina Highway 300 =

State highway in South Carolina, United States

South Carolina Highway 300

Route information
- Maintained by SCDOT
- Length: 11.460 mi (18.443 km)

Major junctions
- West end: US 278 near Barnwell
- East end: US 301 in Ulmer

Location
- Country: United States
- State: South Carolina
- Counties: Barnwell, Allendale

Highway system
- South Carolina State Highway System; Interstate; US; State; Scenic
| ← SC 296 | → US 301 |

South Carolina Highway 300 (SC 300) is an 11.460-mile-long (18.443 km) state highway in the U.S. state of South Carolina. The highway connects Ulmer with the Barnwell area.

== Route description ==
SC 300 begins at US 278 south of Barnwell and heads in a southeasterly direction, crossing over Hurricane Creek and Parker Branch. It runs parallel with Caddins Branch through a small subdivision before it crosses over Wells Branch, leaving Barnwell County. It becomes Wells Branch Road as it enters Allendale County before passing by Dry Branch Hunting Reserve before it enters the Ulmer city limits. The highway then meets its southern terminus at US 301 (Burton's Ferry Highway) west of Ulmer.

== Major intersections ==
| County | Location | mi | km | Destinations | Notes |
|---|---|---|---|---|---|
| Barnwell | | 0.000 | 0.000 | US 278 – Allendale, USC–Salkehatchie, Barnwell | Western terminus |
| Allendale | Ulmer | 11.460 | 18.443 | US 301 (Burton's Ferry Highway) – Allendale | Eastern terminus |
1.000 mi = 1.609 km; 1.000 km = 0.621 mi
