= South Carolina Highway 118 =

State highway in South Carolina, United States

South Carolina Highway 118

Route information
- Maintained by SCDOT
- Length: 13.180 mi (21.211 km)
- Existed: 1975–present

Major junctions
- South end: SC 302 in Aiken
- US 1 / US 78 in Aiken; US 1 in Aiken
- North end: SC 4 / SC 302 near Aiken

Location
- Country: United States
- State: South Carolina
- Counties: Aiken

Highway system
- South Carolina State Highway System; Interstate; US; State; Scenic
| ← US 117 | → SC 119 |

South Carolina Highway 118 (SC 118) is a 13.180-mile (21.211 km) state highway in the U.S. state of South Carolina. The highway, in combination with SC 302, create a non-freeway beltway around downtown Aiken. The highway is officially designated on the road around the southwestern, western, and northern sides of the city. The southeastern portion of the beltway is part of SC 302, which is the termini of SC 118.

== Route description ==
According to the South Carolina Department of Transportation, SC 118 begins at an intersection with SC 302 (Silver Bluff Road) in southern Aiken, within Aiken County. It travels to the west-northwest, concurrent with SC 19 Truck. The two highways travel north of Houndslake Country Club and Aiken Elementary School before heading to the north-northwest. They cross over the Sand River. They also intersect SC 421 (Augusta Road). Just afterward, they travel underneath a railroad bridge and intersect U.S. Route 1 (US 1) and US 78 (Jefferson Davis Highway/Richland Avenue). At this intersection, US 1 Truck/US 78 Truck join the concurrency. They briefly travel outside of the city limits of Aiken. The four highways curve to the northeast and travel through University of South Carolina Aiken. At University Parkway, they re-enter Aiken. Just after Vaucluse Road, they curve to the east-southeast. Just before Arbor Court, they curve to the southeast. They curve to the east-southeast and intersect SC 19 (Laurens Street).

At the intersection with SC 19, SC 19 Truck ends. The three highways pass Aiken High School. They cross some railroad tracks and have a second intersection with US 1 (York Street). Here, US 1 Truck ends. US 78 Truck/SC 118 travels to the southeast and leaves the city limits of Aiken again. They curve to the south-southeast and intersect SC 4/SC 302 (Wagener Road). Here, SC 118 ends and the roadway continues as US 78 Truck and SC 302.

== Major intersections ==
The entire route is in Aiken County.

| Location | mi | km | Destinations | Notes |
|---|---|---|---|---|
| Aiken | 0.000 | 0.000 | SC 302 to US 1 / US 78 – Beech Island, Jackson | Southern terminus |
| Aiken | 4.630 | 7.451 | SC 421 (Augusta Road) | |
| Aiken | 4.850 | 7.805 | US 1 / US 78 (Jefferson Davis Highway/Richland Avenue) / US 1 Truck begins / US 78 Truck begins – Augusta | Southern end of US 1 Truck/US 78 Truck concurrency; southern terminus of US 1 Truck; western terminus of US 78 Truck |
| Aiken | 9.480 | 15.257 | SC 19 (Laurens Street) / SC 19 Truck ends to I-20 – Edgefield | Northern terminus of SC 19 Truck; northern end of SC 19 Truck concurrency |
| Aiken | 10.480 | 16.866 | US 1 / US 1 Truck to I-20 – Batesburg | |
| | 13.180 | 21.211 | US 78 Truck east / SC 4 Truck east / SC 302 / SC 4 | Northern end of US 78 Truck concurrency; western terminus of SC 4 Truck; northern terminus of SC 118 |
1.000 mi = 1.609 km; 1.000 km = 0.621 mi: Concurrency terminus
