= Special routes of U.S. Route 78 =

Special routes of U.S. Route 78

Highway system
- United States Numbered Highway System; List; Special; Divided

At least 15 special routes of U.S. Route 78 have existed and at least seven have been decommissioned.

== Mississippi ==
=== Red Banks business loop ===
U.S. Highway 78 Business
- Location: Red Banks, Mississippi

=== Hickory Flat business loop ===
U.S. Highway 78 Business
- Location: Hickory Flat, Mississippi

== Alabama ==
=== Hamilton–Graysville alternate route ===
U.S. Route 78 Alternate
- Location: Hamilton–Graysville, Alabama

=== Carbon Hill–Jasper alternate route ===
U.S. Route 78 Alternate
- Location: Carbon Hill–Jasper, Alabama

=== Birmingham–Irondale alternate route ===
U.S. Route 78 Alternate
- Location: Birmingham–Irondale, Alabama

=== Birmingham truck route ===
U.S. Route 78 Truck
- Location: Birmingham, Alabama

=== Anniston business loop ===
U.S. Route 78 Business
- Location: Anniston, Alabama

== Alabama–Georgia ==
=== US 78N ===
U.S. Highway 78N
- Location: Heflin, Alabama–Villa Rica, Georgia
- Existed: 1927–November 1934

U.S. Route 78N (US 78N) was a northern divided U.S. highway that comprised the current mainline of US 78 from Heflin, Alabama, to Villa Rica, Georgia.

The road that would eventually become US 78N was established in 1920, as SR 8 from the Alabama state line to Villa Rica. By the end of the third quarter of 1926, US 78 was established, being designated along a local roadway from Heflin to the state line, and SR 8 from the state line to Villa Rica. The next year, US 78 split into two divided routes, with US 78N being designated from Heflin to Villa Rica, on the northern segment of SR 8 (thereby replacing the mainline highway). In 1928, Alabama State Route 4 (SR-4) was designated along US-78N. By May 1933, US 78N/SR 8 were paved from Bremen to Villa Rica. Later that month, US 78N/SR 8 were paved from east of the Alabama state line to Bremen. The next month, US 78N/SR 8 were paved west to the Alabama state line. By November 1934, US 78N was redesignated as part of mainline US 78.

=== US 78S ===
U.S. Highway 78S
- Location: Heflin, Alabama–Villa Rica, Georgia
- Existed: 1927–November 1934

U.S. Route 78S (US 78S) was a southern divided U.S. highway that comprised the current length of Alabama State Route 46 from Heflin, Alabama, to the Georgia state line, SR 166 from the state line to Carrollton, and SR 61 from Carrollton to Villa Rica.

The road that would eventually become US 78 was established in 1920 as part of SR 34 from Carrollton to Villa Rica. By the end of the third quarter of 1921, SR 16 was designated from the Alabama state line, west of Bowdon to Carrollton. By late 1926, SR 16 and SR 34 were redesignated as a southern branch of SR 8. In 1927, US 78 split into two divided routes, with US 78S being designated from Heflin to Villa Rica, via Bowdon and Carrollton, on the southern branch of SR 8. In 1928, Alabama State Route 4 (SR-4) was designated along US-78N, while SR-46 was designated along US-78S. By 1932, US 78S/SR 8 were paved from Carrollton to just southwest of Villa Rica. By the end of 1934, US 78S/SR 8 were paved from the Alabama state line to a point near Bowdon. By November 1934, US 78S was redesignated as US 78 Alternate. By the beginning of 1948, the southern branch of SR 8 was redesignated as SR 8 Alternate. By the middle of 1954, SR 8 Alternate was redesignated as SR 166 from the Alabama state line to northeast of Carrollton) and SR 61 from there to Villa Rica.

=== Heflin–Villa Rica alternate route ===
U.S. Highway 78 Alternate
- Location: Heflin, Alabama–Villa Rica, Georgia
- Existed: 1934–1952

U.S. Route 78 Alternate (US 78 Alt.) was an alternate route of US 78 in northeast Alabama and northwest Georgia. It comprised the current length of Alabama State Route 46 (SR 46) from Heflin, Alabama, to the Georgia state line, SR 166 from the state line to Carrollton, and SR 61 from Carrollton to Villa Rica.

The road that would eventually become US 78 Alternate was established in 1920 as part of SR 34 from Carrollton to Villa Rica. By the end of the third quarter of 1921, SR 16 was designated from the Alabama state line, west of Bowdon to Carrollton. By late 1926, SR 16 and SR 34 were redesignated as a southern branch of SR 8. In 1927, US 78 split into two divided routes, with US 78S being designated from Heflin to Villa Rica, via Bowdon and Carrollton, on the southern branch of SR 8. In 1928, SR 4 was designated along US-78N, while SR 46 was designated along US-78S. By 1932, US 78S/SR 8 were paved from Carrollton to just southwest of Villa Rica. By the end of 1934, US 78S/SR 8 were paved from the Alabama state line to a point near Bowdon. By November 1934, US 78S was redesignated as US 78 Alt. By the beginning of 1948, the southern branch of SR 8 was redesignated as SR 8 Alternate. By the beginning of 1953, US 78 Alt. was decommissioned. SR 8 Alternate became SR 166 from the Alabama state line to northeast of Carrollton by the middle of 1954, and SR 61 from there to Villa Rica.

== Georgia ==
=== Athens business loop ===
U.S. Highway 78 Business
- Location: Athens, Georgia
- Length: 10.3 mi (16.6 km)

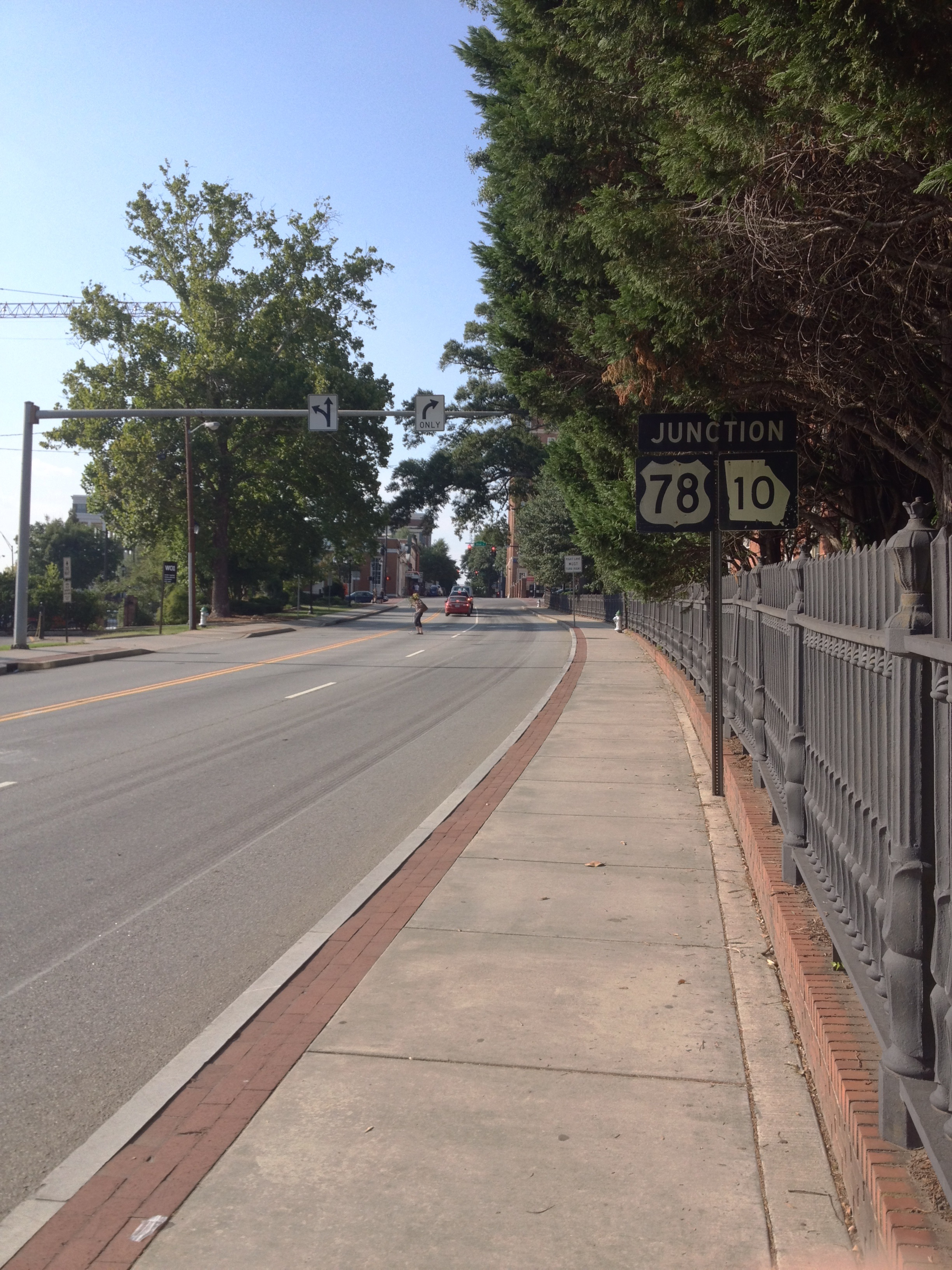
US 78 Business/SR 10 (Broad Street) intersection with Lumpkin Street in the heart of Athens. This sign along Lumpkin Street says that Broad Street carries US 78 instead of the business route.

U.S. Route 78 Business (US 78 Bus.) in the Athens – Clarke County metropolitan area is a Bannered U.S. Highway that is concurrent with Georgia State Route 10 (SR 10) for its entire length. Its western terminus is at an interchange with US 29/SR 8/SR 316 and US 78/SR 10, southeast of Bogart in Oconee County. Its eastern terminus is at US 29/US 78/US 129/US 441/SR 8/SR 10 Loop/SR 15. The roadway continues as US 78/SR 10.

All of US 78 Bus. in Clarke County is included as part of the National Highway System, a system of roadways important to the nation's economy, defense, and mobility.

Prior to the completion of the Athens Perimeter Highway, and SR 316, the Broad Street and Atlanta Highway portions of US 78 Business carried US 29/US 78 through Athens' downtown and commercial west side. US 29 entered Athens via North Avenue and Thomas Street, joining US 78 at the Broad Street–Thomas Street–Oconee Street intersection downtown. The combined highways continued to the Pepsi bottling plant in Bogart, where US 78 turned left onto the Moina Michael Highway and US 29 continued straight into Bogart.

When SR 10 Loop was completed, US 29 was routed along the north side of the loop, while US 78 was routed along the south side, with US 78 Bus. being established inside the loop. North Avenue and Thomas Street had their state route designation removed. SR 316 (also carrying US 29) had been completed only up to Moina Michael Highway, so the stretch of highway from there to SR 10 Loop (sections of Moina Michael Highway and Atlanta Highway) continued to carry US 29/US 78. Once SR 316 was completed to SR 10 Loop, US 29/US 78 were moved to SR 316, and US 29 was switched from the north side of the loop to the south side of the loop while US 78 Bus. was extended over Atlanta Highway and Moina Michael Highway to its present state. (Some maps still show US 29 along the north side of SR 10 Loop but that is incorrect; all signage is consistent with US 29 being routed on the south and east sides of the loop.)

County	Location	mi	km	Destinations	Notes
Oconee		0.0– 0.2	0.0– 0.32	US 29 / SR 8 / SR 316 (University Parkway) / US 78 / SR 10 west (Monroe Highway) – Atlanta, University of Georgia Center for Continuing Education	Western end of SR 10 concurrency; western terminus; interchange
Clarke	Athens	3.6– 3.7	5.8– 6.0	SR 10 Loop (Athens Perimeter Highway / SR 422) – Hartwell, Elberton, Watkinsville, Univ. of Georgia, State Botanical Garden, UGA Center for Continuing Education Conference Center & Hotel, UGA Stadium	SR 10 Loop exit 18
Clarke	Athens	5.3– 5.6	8.5– 9.0	Epps Bridge Parkway south to SR 316 west – Atlanta	Interchange; northern terminus of Epps Bridge Parkway
Clarke	Athens	6.0– 6.0	9.7– 9.7	Officer Buddy Christian Memorial Bridge	Crossing over Middle Oconee River
Clarke	Athens	8.1	13.0	SR 15 Alt. (Milledge Avenue) – Greensboro, Gainesville	
Clarke	Athens	10.1– 10.3	16.3– 16.6	US 29 / US 78 / US 129 / US 441 / SR 8 / SR 10 east / SR 10 Loop / SR 15 (Athens Perimeter Highway / SR 422) – Watkinsville, Monroe, Winder, Commerce, Jefferson, Hartwell, Lexington, Washington	Eastern end of SR 10 concurrency; eastern terminus; SR 10 Loop exit 8
1.000 mi = 1.609 km; 1.000 km = 0.621 mi: Concurrency terminus

=== Washington business loop ===
U.S. Highway 78 Business
- Location: Washington, Georgia
- Length: 4.6 mi (7.4 km)
- Existed: 1980–

U.S. Route 78 Business (US 78 Bus.) is a 4.6-mile-long (7.4 km) business route of US 78 that exists entirely within the south-central part of Wilkes County. Nearly its entire length is within the city limits of Washington. It is concurrent with State Route 10 Business (SR 10 Bus.) for its entire length.

The concurrency begins at an intersection with US 78/SR 10, northwest of Washington. The business routes are known as Lexington Avenue. They travel to the southeast until they enter the city limits; then, they curve to the east-southeast. Just past Recreation Drive, they enter the Washington Historic District. They intersect SR 44 (North Mercer Street). At the eastern terminus of Callow Drive, US 78 Bus./SR 10 Bus. curve to an east-southeast direction and are known as West Robert Toombs Avenue, named for Robert Toombs, a U.S. Representative and senator from Georgia, as well as a Confederate general and Confederate Secretary of State. At Depot Street, they are about one block north of the northern terminus of the Georgia Woodlands Railroad line. Spring Street marks the beginning of a concurrency with SR 47. Between Spring Street and Cheney Parkway, the three highways pass by the town square. At the corner of East Liberty Street, they pass by the historic Washington Presbyterian Church, just before passing the Robert Toombs House. A short distance later, they intersect SR 17 Bus. (Poplar Street), which joins the concurrency. Immediately after that intersection, the four highways curve to the southeast and pass the Washington–Wilkes Historical Museum. US 78 Bus./SR 10 Bus./SR 17 Bus./SR 47 intersect East Street, which leads to Washington–Wilkes Elementary School. They continue to the southeast, before intersecting US 78/US 378/SR 10/SR 17. At this intersection, US 78 Bus./SR 10 Bus./SR 17 Bus. end, while SR 47 continues, concurrent with the beginning of US 378 (Lincolnton Road). US 78 Bus. is not part of the National Highway System, a system of roadways important to the nation's economy, defense, and mobility.

In 1970, US 78 and SR 10 were routed along SR 10 Loop in the northern part of Washington, with the former routing becoming US 78 Bus. (and presumably SR 10 Bus.). In 1986, SR 10 Loop was decommissioned.

The entire route is in Wilkes County.

Location	mi	km	Destinations	Notes
	0.0	0.0	US 78 / SR 10 (Lexington Road) / SR 10 Bus. begins – Lexington, Athens	Western end of SR 10 Bus. concurrency; western terminus of US 78 Bus. and SR 10 Bus.
Washington	2.5	4.0	SR 44 (North Mercer Street) – Union Point, Greensboro	Provides access to Willis Memorial Hospital
Washington	3.0	4.8	SR 47 south (Spring Street) – Crawfordville	Western end of SR 47 concurrency; provides access to Wills Memorial Hospital
Washington	3.4	5.5	SR 17 Bus. north (Poplar Drive) – Danburg, Chennault	Western end of SR 17 Bus. concurrency
Washington	4.6	7.4	US 78 / SR 10 / SR 17 (Sam McGill Parkway) / SR 10 Bus. ends / SR 17 Bus. ends / US 378 east / SR 47 south (Lincolnton Road) to I-20 – Elberton, Athens, Lexington, Thomson, Lincolnton, Richard B. Russell State Park	Eastern end of SR 10 Bus., SR 17 Bus., and SR 47 concurrencies; eastern terminus of US 78 Bus. and SR 10 Bus.; southern terminus of SR 17 Bus.; western terminus of US 378; SR 47 continues, concurrent with US 378.
1.000 mi = 1.609 km; 1.000 km = 0.621 mi: Concurrency terminus

== South Carolina ==
=== Aiken truck route ===
U.S. Highway 78 Truck
- Location: Aiken, South Carolina
- Length: 8.440 mi (13.583 km)

U.S. Route 78 Truck (US 78 Truck) is a truck route of US 78 that bypasses north of downtown Aiken, via University Parkway and Rudy Mason Parkway. Its routing is in complete concurrency with US 1 Truck, and it is also concurrent with other truck routes from U.S. and state highways. The highway is two-lane on both ends, with four-lane stretches between Laurens Street and Willow Run Road and between Old Wagener Road and Charleston Highway. Though the routing is longer than going through the downtown area, it does provide a faster connection with US 1.

The entire route is in Aiken County.

Location	mi	km	Destinations	Notes
Aiken	0.000	0.000	US 1 / US 78 / US 1 Truck begins / SC 19 Truck south / SC 118 south – Augusta, Aiken, Aiken Technical College	Western end of US 1 Truck, SC 19 Truck, and SC 118 concurrencies; western terminus of US 78 Truck; southern terminus of US 1 Truck; provides access to Aiken Regional Medical Center
Aiken	4.630	7.451	SC 19 (Laurens Street NW) / SC 19 Truck ends to I-20 – Aiken, Edgefield	Eastern end of SC 19 Truck concurrency
Aiken	5.630	9.061	US 1 (York Street) to I-20 – Aiken, Batesburg	
	8.330	13.406	SC 4 / SC 302 east (Wagener Road) / SC 4 Truck begins	Eastern end of SC 118 concurrency; western end of SC 4 Truck/SC 302 concurrency; western terminus of SC 4 Truck; northern terminus of SC 118
	8.440	13.583	US 1 Truck ends / US 78 / SC 4 Truck east / SC 302 west (Pine Log Road SE)	Eastern end of US 1/US 78 Truck and SC 4 Truck/SC 302 concurrencies; eastern terminus
1.000 mi = 1.609 km; 1.000 km = 0.621 mi: Concurrency terminus

=== Blackville business loop ===
U.S. Highway 78 Business
- Location: Blackville, South Carolina
- Length: 0.530 mi (853 m)
- Existed: 1981–present

U.S. Route 78 Business (US 78 Bus.) is a short business loop in the central part of the town of Blackville, via Walker and Main Streets. Even though it is signed west of South Carolina Highway 3 (SC 3; Solomon Blatt Avenue), the South Carolina Department of Transportation only includes the portion east of SC 3 as part of the business route. Originally, US 78 traversed along the route until by 1967, when new road south was created, allowing it to bypass Main Street. The old alignment was not made into a business route till at least 1981; however, though it is signed as a business loop, on state and county maps it is officially a connector route in disguise.

The entire route is in Blackville, Barnwell County.

mi	km	Destinations	Notes
0.000	0.000	US 78 (Dexter Street) – Williston, Denmark	Western signed terminus; not officially part of the path
0.000	0.000	SC 3 (Solomon Blatt Avenue) – Barnwell, Columbia	Western official terminus
0.530	0.853	US 78 (Dexter Street) – Denmark, Williston	Eastern terminus
1.000 mi = 1.609 km; 1.000 km = 0.621 mi

=== Bamberg County connector route ===
U.S. Highway 78 Connector
- Location: Bamberg County, South Carolina
- Length: 0.140 mi (225 m)

U.S. Route 78 Connector (US 78 Conn.) is a short connector route in the southeastern part of Bamberg County. It connects South Carolina Highway 61 (SC 61), at a point just southeast of its northern terminus, with US 78.
