= Elko, South Carolina =

- Town
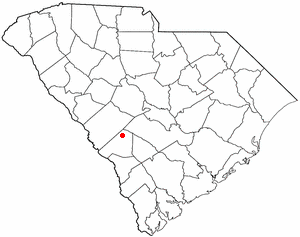
- Location of Elko, South Carolina
- Coordinates: 33°22′38″N 81°22′35″W
- Country: United States
- State: South Carolina
- County: Barnwell

Area
  - Total: 1.05 sq mi (2.72 km^{2})
  - Land: 1.05 sq mi (2.72 km^{2})
  - Water: 0 sq mi (0.00 km^{2})
- Elevation: 335 ft (102 m)

Population (2020)
  - Total: 140
  - Density: 133.5/sq mi (51.53/km^{2})
- Time zone: UTC-5 (Eastern (EST))
  - Summer (DST): UTC-4 (EDT)
- ZIP code: 29826
- Area codes: 803, 839
- FIPS code: 45-23335
- GNIS feature ID: 2406438
- Website: https://elkosc.com/

Elko is a town in Barnwell County, South Carolina, United States. As of the 2020 census, Elko had a population of 140.

== Geography ==
Elko is located in northern Barnwell County. U.S. Route 78 passes through the center of the town, leading east 6 miles (10 km) to Blackville and west 2 miles (3 km) to Williston. South Carolina Highway 37 crosses US 78 at the center of Elko, leading south 10 miles (16 km) to Barnwell, the county seat, and northeast 10 miles (16 km) to Springfield.

According to the United States Census Bureau, the town of Elko has a total area of 1.0 square mile (2.7 km^{2}), all land.

== Demographics ==
Historical population
Census	Pop.	Note	%±
1880	149		—
1890	100		−32.9%
1900	208		108.0%
1910	114		−45.2%
1920	188		64.9%
1930	210		11.7%
1940	206		−1.9%
1950	142		−31.1%
1960	194		36.6%
1970	202		4.1%
1980	329		62.9%
1990	214		−35.0%
2000	212		−0.9%
2010	193		−9.0%
2020	140		−27.5%
U.S. Decennial Census

=== 2020 census ===
Elko town, South Carolina – Racial and ethnic composition Note: the US Census treats Hispanic/Latino as an ethnic category. This table excludes Latinos from the racial categories and assigns them to a separate category. Hispanics/Latinos may be of any race.
Race / Ethnicity (NH = Non-Hispanic)	Pop 2000	Pop 2010	Pop 2020	% 2000	% 2010	% 2020
White alone (NH)	88	78	47	41.51%	40.41%	33.57%
Black or African American alone (NH)	124	113	73	58.49%	58.55%	52.14%
Native American or Alaska Native alone (NH)	0	0	3	0.00%	0.00%	2.14%
Asian alone (NH)	0	0	0	0.00%	0.00%	0.00%
Native Hawaiian or Pacific Islander alone (NH)	0	0	0	0.00%	0.00%	0.00%
Other race alone (NH)	0	0	1	0.00%	0.00%	0.71%
Mixed race or Multiracial (NH)	0	1	4	0.00%	0.52%	2.86%
Hispanic or Latino (any race)	0	1	12	0.00%	0.52%	8.57%
Total	212	193	140	100.00%	100.00%	100.00%

=== 2000 ===
According to the 2000 census, there were 212 people, 92 households, and 65 families living in the town. The population density was 183.0 inhabitants per square mile (70.7/km^{2}). There were 102 housing units at an average density of 88.0 per square mile (34.0/km^{2}). The racial makeup of the town was 41.51% White and 58.49% African American. Of the 92 households 29.3% had children under the age of 18 living with them, 42.4% were married couples living together, 23.9% had a female householder with no husband present, and 28.3% were non-families. 26.1% of households were one person and 9.8% were one person aged 65 or older. The average household size was 2.30 and the average family size was 2.73.

The age distribution was 24.5% under the age of 18, 2.8% from 18 to 24, 29.7% from 25 to 44, 28.8% from 45 to 64, and 14.2% 65 or older. The median age was 42 years. For every 100 females there were 92.7 males. For every 100 females age 18 and over, there were 86.0 males.

The median household income was $23,571 and the median family income was $37,500. Males had a median income of $35,536 versus $27,083 for females. The per capita income for the town was $15,973. About 19.0% of families and 22.9% of the population were below the poverty line, including 36.1% of those under the age of eighteen and 51.5% of those sixty five or over.
