= Orangeburg County, South Carolina =

County in South Carolina, United States

- County
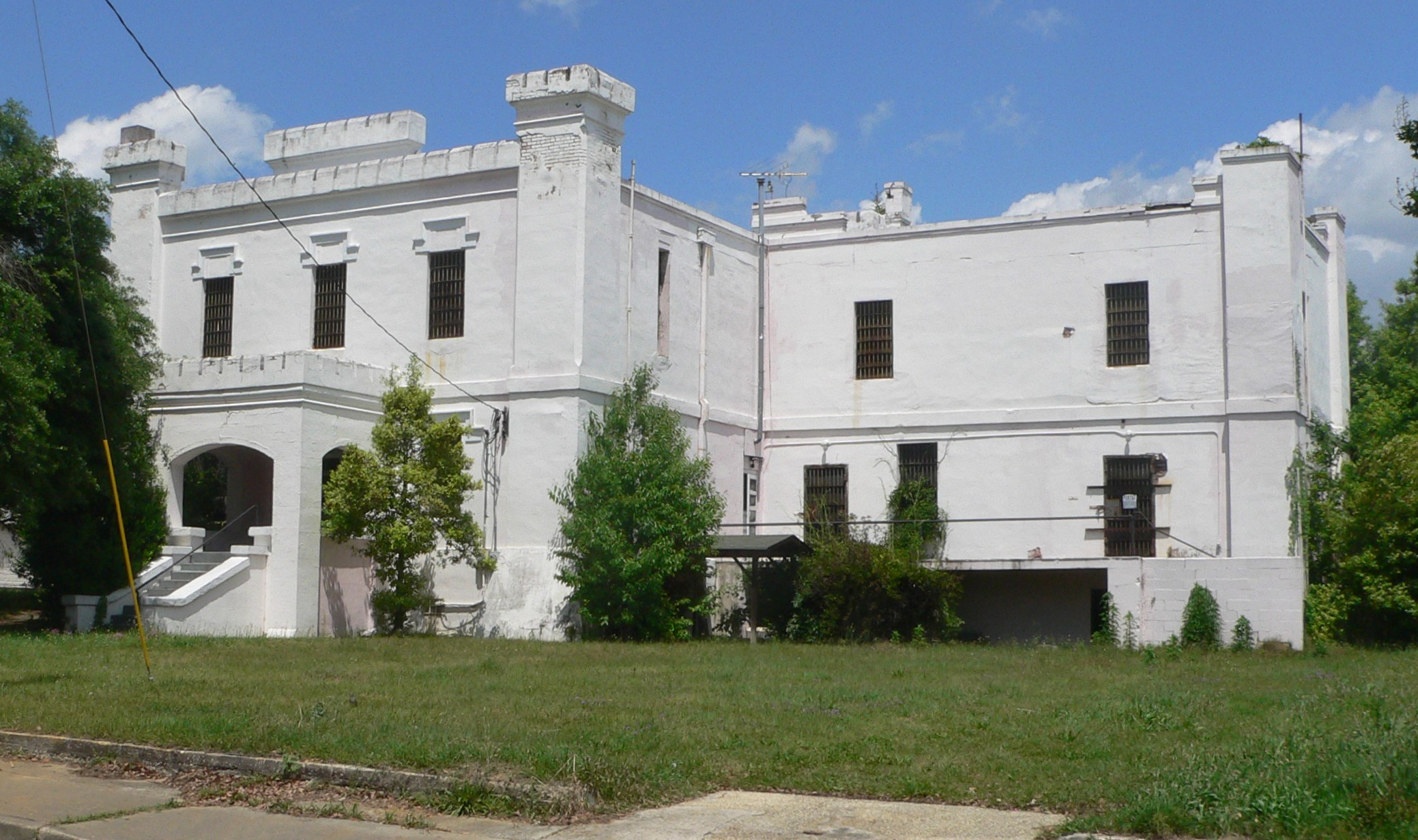
- Old Orangeburg County Jail

- Flag Seal
- Motto(s): "Community & Character"
- Location within the U.S. state of South Carolina
- Coordinates: 33.44°N 80.80°W
- Country: United States
- State: South Carolina
- Founded: March 12, 1785
- Named for: William IV of Orange
- Seat: Orangeburg
- Largest community: Orangeburg

Area
  - Total: 1,127.89 sq mi (2,921.2 km^{2})
  - Land: 1,106.38 sq mi (2,865.5 km^{2})
  - Water: 21.51 sq mi (55.7 km^{2}) 1.91%

Population (2020)
  - Total: 84,223
  - Estimate (2025): 83,177 ▼
  - Density: 76.125/sq mi (29.392/km^{2})
- Time zone: UTC−5 (Eastern)
  - Summer (DST): UTC−4 (EDT)
- Congressional districts: 2nd, 6th
- Website: www.orangeburgcounty.org

Orangeburg County is a county located in the U.S. state of South Carolina. As of the 2020 census, the population was 84,223. Its county seat is Orangeburg. The county was created in 1769.

Orangeburg County comprises the Orangeburg, South Carolina Micropolitan Statistical Area, which is also included in the Columbia-Sumter-Orangeburg, South Carolina Combined Statistical Area. It is located in the Midlands of South Carolina.

It is the home of South Carolina State University, the only public four-year historically Black university in South Carolina. It is also home to Claflin University, the oldest historically Black college or university (HBCU) in the state.

== History ==
The district was occupied for thousands of years by Indigenous peoples of the Southeastern Woodlands. By the time of European arrival, tribes such as the Cheraw, Catawba, and Pedee, inhabited the Piedmont area above the fall line.

The Orangeburg Judicial District, named in honor of William IV, Prince of Orange, was chartered by European Americans in 1769 from a mostly unorganized upland area between the Congaree and Savannah rivers. A county, initially of the same name but later called Orange, was organized within the district but deorganized in 1791, after the American Revolutionary War.

The southwest portion bordering on the Savannah River, about half of Orangeburg District, was separated and organized as Barnwell District in 1800. In 1804 the northern third of the district was separated to form the new Lexington District, which gained another, smaller portion of Orangeburg District in 1832.

During the 19th century, the districts and counties were developed chiefly as cotton plantations for short-staple cotton. This development followed the invention of the cotton gin in the late 18th century, which made the processing of short-staple cotton profitable. The county became a center of labor by enslaved Black people on the plantations, who were transported from coastal areas and the Upper South to cultivate and process cotton. Those brought from the coastal areas were likely of the Gullah culture and language. The enslaved African Americans greatly outnumbered the white planters and non-slaveholding whites. Reflecting the patterns of 19th-century settlement, the area is still chiefly agricultural and has a majority African American population.

In 1868, under the revised state constitution during the Reconstruction era, South Carolina districts were organized as counties. Each county had townships, which were also used as census divisions in the 1870, 1880, 1890^{a} and 1900 censuses. The township names were derived from places within a particular area (towns, railroad stops, plantations, etc.), many of which have been overshadowed by the dynamic growth and focus of organizational energy into today's communities. Orangeburg had townships named: Amelia, Branchville, Bull Swamp, Caw Caw (East of Old Orangeburg Rd), Court House, Cow Castle, Edisto, Elizabeth, Goodbyes / Goodbys, Goodland / Good Lands, Hebron, Hopewell, Liberty, Lyons, Middle, New Hope, Orangeburg, Orange, Pine Grove, Poplar, Providence, Union, Willow, Vance and Zion.

Resident voters following the 1868 changes were enabled to elect their state representatives rather than having them chosen by the state legislature, as was done previously. Election of representatives by the state legislature had kept the districts dominated by the elite owners of major plantations in the Low Country and elsewhere. The changes in rules expanded participation in the franchise by more male residents. Emancipation of slaves after the war under newly ratified federal constitutional amendments resulted in freedmen voting. Using voter intimidation, white Democrats took control of the state legislature by the end of the century; they passed state electoral laws and a new constitution that essentially disfranchised most blacks, a situation that lasted until after the federal legislation of the 1965 Voting Rights Act.

A small western portion of Orangeburg County was annexed in 1871 to the newly formed Aiken County during the Reconstruction era.

In 1908 the northern portion of the County along the Congaree River was separated and included in the newly formed Calhoun County, with its seat at Saint Matthews. In 1910 a small western portion of Berkeley County, around Holly Hill and Eutawville, was annexed to Orangeburg County, thus bringing the county to its present size. The 1913 soil maps for Eastern Orangeburg County and Western Orangeburg County also display the early 20th century community names, roads, railroads and waterways.

== Geography ==
Interactive map of Orangeburg County

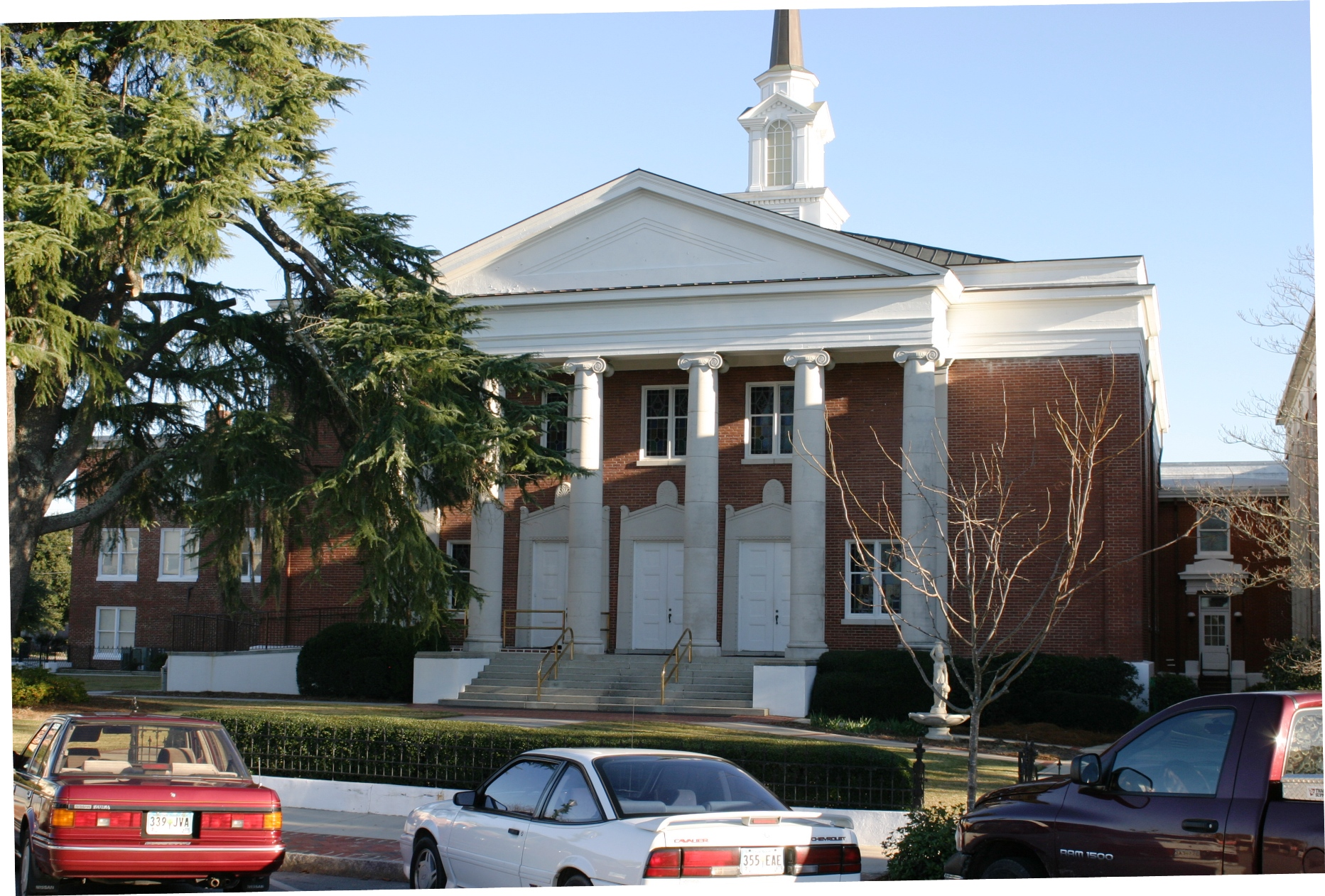
First Baptist Church, downtown Orangeburg

According to the U.S. Census Bureau, the county has a total area of 1,127.89 square miles (2,921.2 km^{2}), of which 1,106.38 square miles (2,865.5 km^{2}) is land and 21.51 square miles (55.7 km^{2}) (1.91%) is water. It is the second-largest county in South Carolina by land area and fifth-largest by land area.

Orangeburg county is a fairly big county, covering 1,128 square miles, it is about 60 miles from the western part of the county to the eastern part of the county. Orangeburg county lies within 3 "regions" of South Carolina. The western part of the county lies in the "CSRA" (Central Savannah River Area). The middle part of Orangeburg county is included in the "Midlands" Region. The eastern and south eastern part of the county are located in the "Lowcountry" region of the state.

=== National protected areas ===
- Eutaw Springs Battleground Park

=== State and local protected areas ===
- Santee Cooper Wildlife Management Area
- Indian Bluff Recreation Park
- Santee State Park

=== Major water bodies ===
- Congaree River
- Cooper River
- Edisto River
- Four Hole Swamp
- Lake Marion
- North Fork Edisto River
- South Fork Edisto River

=== Adjacent counties ===
- Calhoun County – north
- Clarendon County – northeast
- Dorchester County – southeast
- Berkeley County – southeast
- Bamberg County – south
- Colleton County – south
- Aiken County – west
- Barnwell County – west
- Lexington County – northwest

== Demographics ==
Historical population
Census	Pop.	Note	%±
1790	18,513		—
1800	15,766		−14.8%
1810	13,229		−16.1%
1820	15,653		18.3%
1830	18,453		17.9%
1840	18,519		0.4%
1850	23,582		27.3%
1860	24,896		5.6%
1870	16,865		−32.3%
1880	41,395		145.4%
1890	49,393		19.3%
1900	59,663		20.8%
1910	55,893		−6.3%
1920	64,907		16.1%
1930	63,864		−1.6%
1940	63,707		−0.2%
1950	68,726		7.9%
1960	68,559		−0.2%
1970	69,789		1.8%
1980	82,276		17.9%
1990	84,803		3.1%
2000	91,582		8.0%
2010	92,501		1.0%
2020	84,223		−8.9%
2025 (est.)	83,177	▼	−1.2%
U.S. Decennial Census; 1790–1960 1900–1990; 1990–2000 2010 2020

=== 2020 census ===
As of the 2020 census, there were 84,223 people, 33,825 households, and 20,620 families residing in the county. The median age was 42.3 years, 21.0% of residents were under the age of 18, and 21.0% of residents were 65 years of age or older. For every 100 females there were 87.4 males, and for every 100 females age 18 and over there were 83.8 males.

Out of 46 counties in South Carolina, Orangeburg County is the most populous of the 8 counties that have an African American majority population.

34.5% of residents lived in urban areas, while 65.5% lived in rural areas.

Of the 33,825 households, 27.5% had children under the age of 18 living with them and 38.1% had a female householder with no spouse or partner present. About 32.5% of all households were made up of individuals and 15.1% had someone living alone who was 65 years of age or older.

There were 41,197 housing units, of which 17.9% were vacant. Among occupied housing units, 68.8% were owner-occupied and 31.2% were renter-occupied. The homeowner vacancy rate was 1.7% and the rental vacancy rate was 11.2%.

=== Racial and ethnic composition ===
Orangeburg County, South Carolina – Racial and ethnic composition Note: the US Census treats Hispanic/Latino as an ethnic category. This table excludes Latinos from the racial categories and assigns them to a separate category. Hispanics/Latinos may be of any race.
Race / Ethnicity (NH = Non-Hispanic)	Pop 1980	Pop 1990	Pop 2000	Pop 2010	Pop 2020	% 1980	% 1990	% 2000	% 2010	% 2020
White alone (NH)	35,575	34,830	33,721	31,206	27,787	43.24%	41.07%	36.82%	33.74%	32.99%
Black or African American alone (NH)	45,277	49,109	55,507	57,286	50,802	55.03%	57.91%	60.61%	61.93%	60.32%
Native American or Alaska Native alone (NH)	150	210	413	468	467	0.18%	0.25%	0.45%	0.51%	0.55%
Asian alone (NH)	197	315	393	751	892	0.24%	0.37%	0.43%	0.81%	1.06%
Native Hawaiian or Pacific Islander alone (NH)	x	x	15	12	37	x	x	0.02%	0.01%	0.04%
Other race alone (NH)	28	8	91	57	200	0.03%	0.01%	0.10%	0.06%	0.24%
Mixed race or Multiracial (NH)	x	x	567	954	2,071	x	x	0.62%	1.03%	2.46%
Hispanic or Latino (any race)	1,049	331	875	1,767	1,967	1.27%	0.39%	0.96%	1.91%	2.34%
Total	82,276	84,803	91,582	92,501	84,223	100.00%	100.00%	100.00%	100.00%	100.00%

The 2020 census recorded the racial makeup of the county as 33.3% White, 60.6% Black or African American, 0.6% American Indian and Alaska Native, 1.1% Asian, 0.0% Native Hawaiian and Pacific Islander, 1.4% from some other race, and 3.0% from two or more races. Hispanic or Latino residents of any race comprised 2.3% of the population.

=== 2010 census ===
At the 2010 census, there were 92,501 people, 35,788 households, and 23,580 families in the county. The population density was 83.6 inhabitants per square mile (32.3 inhabitants/km^{2}). There were 42,504 housing units at an average density of 38.4 units per square mile (14.8 units/km^{2}). The racial makeup of the county was 62.2% black or African American, 34.3% white, 0.8% Asian, 0.5% American Indian, 0.9% from other races, and 1.2% from two or more races. Those of Hispanic or Latino origin made up 1.9% of the population. In terms of ancestry, 7.7% were American, and 5.1% were German.

Of the 35,788 households, 32.5% had children under the age of 18 living with them, 38.1% were married couples living together, 22.5% had a female householder with no husband present, 34.1% were non-families, and 29.0% of households were made up of individuals. The average household size was 2.49 and the average family size was 3.06. The median age was 38.1 years.

The median household income was $32,849 and the median family income was $40,332. Males had a median income of $35,934 versus $28,508 for females. The per capita income for the county was $17,579. About 21.1% of families and 25.8% of the population were below the poverty line, including 32.9% of those under age 18 and 19.1% of those age 65 or over.

=== 2000 census ===
At the 2000 census, there were 91,582 people, 34,118 households, and 23,882 families in the county. The population density was 83 people per square mile (32 people/km^{2}). There were 39,304 housing units at an average density of 36 units per square mile (14 units/km^{2}). The racial makeup of the county was 60.86% Black or African American, 37.17% White, 0.46% Native American, 0.43% Asian, 0.02% Pacific Islander, 0.36% from other races, and 0.70% from two or more races. 0.96% of the population were Hispanic or Latino of any race. Of the 34,118 households 32.00% had children under the age of 18 living with them, 45.10% were married couples living together, 20.30% had a female householder with no husband present, and 30.00% were non-families. 26.00% of households were one person and 10.30% were one person aged 65 or older. The average household size was 2.58 and the average family size was 3.11.

The age distribution was 26.00% under the age of 18, 11.90% from 18 to 24, 26.10% from 25 to 44, 22.80% from 45 to 64, and 13.20% 65 or older. The median age was 35 years. For every 100 females there were 87.00 males. For every 100 females age 18 and over, there were 81.60 males.

The median household income was $29,567 and the median family income was $36,165. Males had a median income of $29,331 versus $20,956 for females. The per capita income for the county was $15,057. About 17.00% of families and 21.40% of the population were below the poverty line, including 27.20% of those under age 18 and 22.30% of those age 65 or over.

== Government and politics ==
Orangeburg is a solidly Democratic county in presidential elections; it has not voted Republican since 1972.

United States presidential election results for Orangeburg County, South Carolina
Year	Republican		Democratic		Third party(ies)	
Year	No.	%	No.	%	No.	%
1900	167	6.36%	2,457	93.64%	0	0.00%
1904	238	7.49%	2,941	92.51%	0	0.00%
1908	405	13.09%	2,687	86.87%	1	0.03%
1912	40	2.37%	1,550	91.99%	95	5.64%
1916	159	5.62%	2,641	93.29%	31	1.10%
1920	304	10.74%	2,526	89.23%	1	0.04%
1924	67	3.71%	1,727	95.57%	13	0.72%
1928	92	5.62%	1,545	94.38%	0	0.00%
1932	111	4.03%	2,643	95.87%	3	0.11%
1936	59	1.96%	2,947	98.04%	0	0.00%
1940	56	2.32%	2,356	97.68%	0	0.00%
1944	87	3.23%	2,440	90.61%	166	6.16%
1948	164	4.36%	435	11.56%	3,164	84.08%
1952	4,695	62.40%	2,829	37.60%	0	0.00%
1956	1,467	21.20%	2,511	36.28%	2,943	42.52%
1960	5,233	57.36%	3,890	42.64%	0	0.00%
1964	10,456	65.09%	5,607	34.91%	0	0.00%
1968	5,144	24.20%	8,971	42.20%	7,144	33.60%
1972	11,711	59.31%	7,652	38.75%	382	1.93%
1976	8,794	38.90%	13,652	60.40%	158	0.70%
1980	11,313	40.79%	16,178	58.33%	242	0.87%
1984	14,286	48.20%	15,121	51.02%	229	0.77%
1988	13,281	47.35%	14,655	52.25%	113	0.40%
1992	11,328	35.14%	18,440	57.21%	2,466	7.65%
1996	10,494	34.62%	18,610	61.39%	1,211	3.99%
2000	12,657	38.67%	19,802	60.49%	275	0.84%
2004	12,695	33.80%	24,698	65.75%	171	0.46%
2008	12,115	30.47%	27,263	68.58%	376	0.95%
2012	12,022	27.93%	30,720	71.37%	299	0.69%
2016	11,931	30.66%	26,318	67.64%	661	1.70%
2020	13,603	33.01%	27,295	66.24%	307	0.75%
2024	13,750	37.19%	22,832	61.76%	388	1.05%

== Economy ==
Orangeburg County is one of the largest agricultural producing counties in South Carolina, with fertile, slightly rolling land. Major crops are cotton, soybeans, corn, turf grass and watermelons.

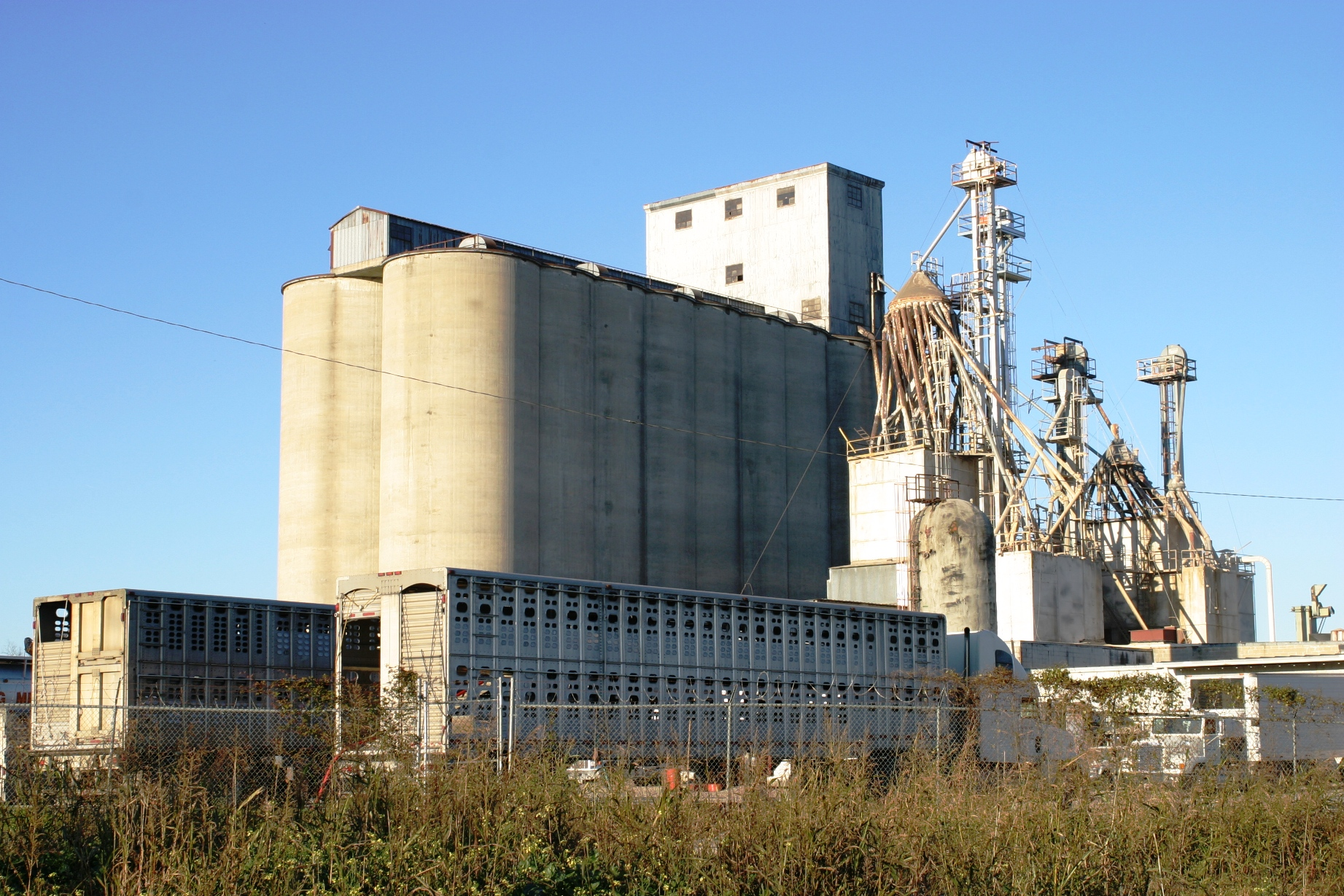
Grain elevator in the county

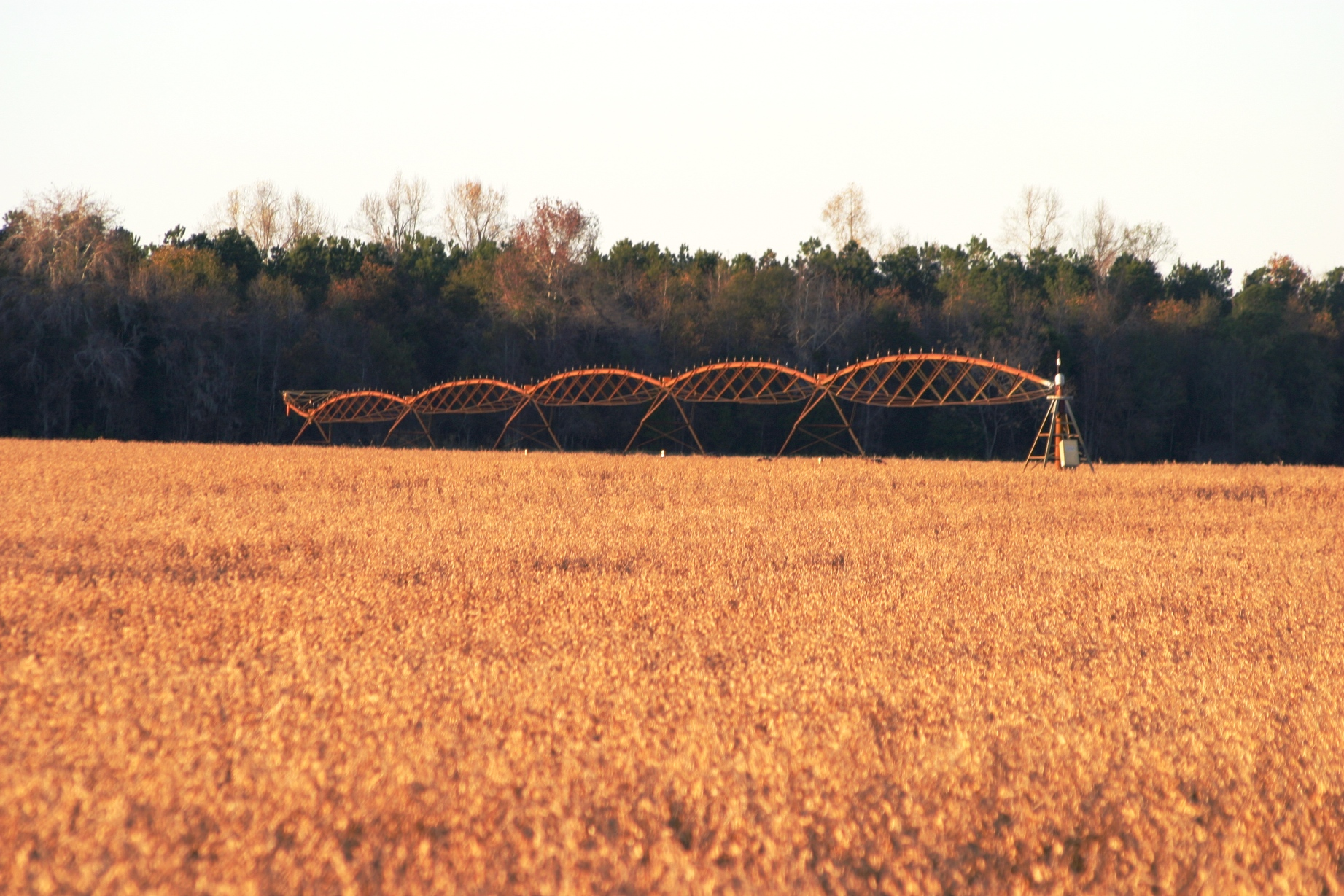
Soybeans ready for harvest, with center pivot irrigation setup

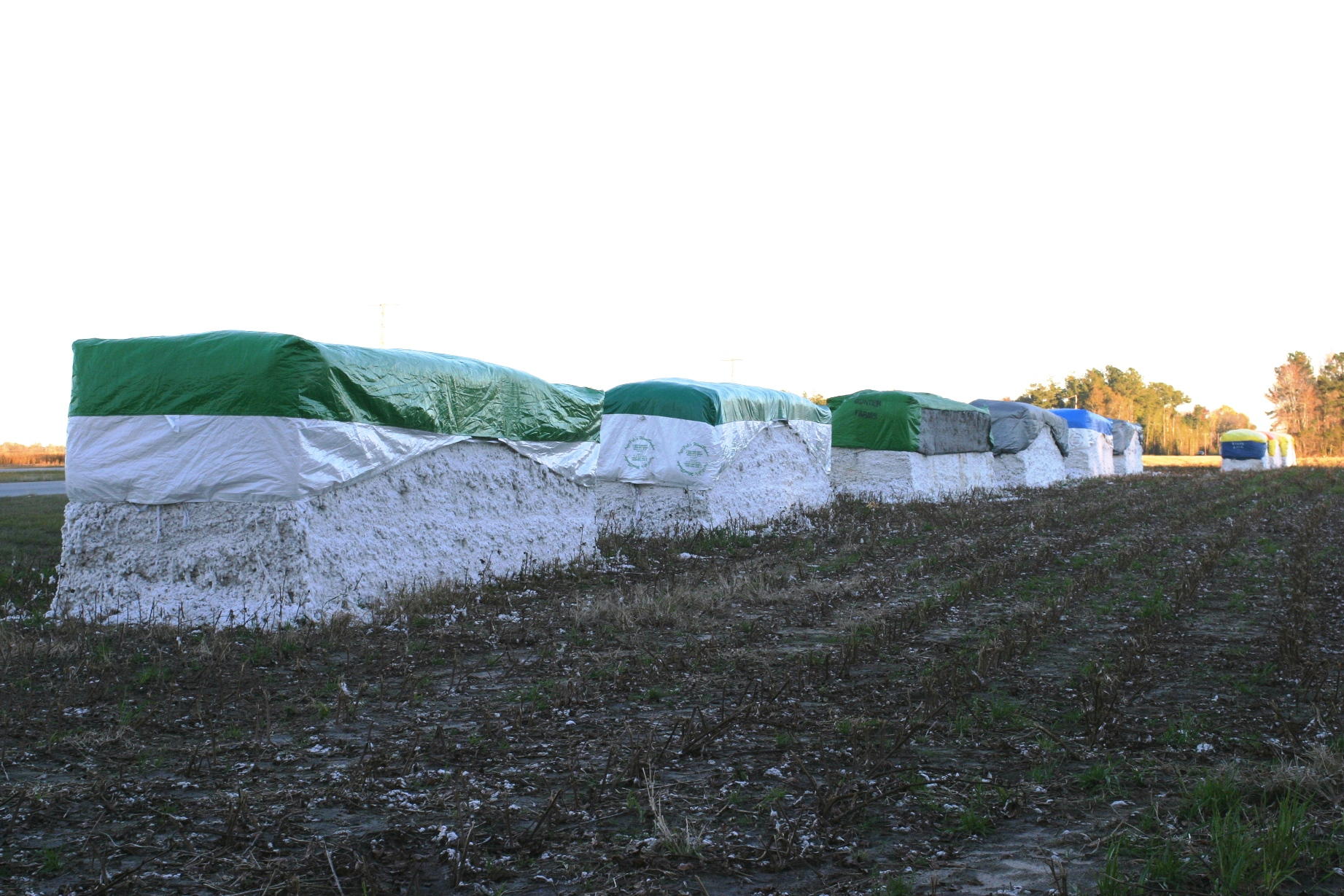
Harvested cotton in modules ready for pickup

In 2022, the GDP was $3.4 billion (about $40,510 per capita), and the real GDP was $2.8 billion (about $33,219 per capita) in chained 2017 dollars.

As of April 2024, some of the largest employers in the county include Claflin University, GPM Investments, Husqvarna Group, Love's, Medical University of South Carolina, Orangeburg–Calhoun Technical College, South Carolina State University, Okonite, and Walmart.

Employment and Wage Statistics by Industry in Orangeburg County, South Carolina - Q3 2023
Industry	Employment Counts	Employment Percentage (%)	Average Annual Wage ($)
Accommodation and Food Services	3,146	11.2	19,968
Administrative and Support and Waste Management and Remediation Services	860	3.1	29,224
Agriculture, Forestry, Fishing and Hunting	479	1.7	46,072
Arts, Entertainment, and Recreation	308	1.1	19,292
Construction	740	2.6	64,272
Educational Services	3,228	11.5	48,464
Finance and Insurance	460	1.6	55,068
Health Care and Social Assistance	3,973	14.2	35,516
Information	119	0.4	61,880
Manufacturing	4,839	17.3	63,960
Other Services (except Public Administration)	446	1.6	37,336
Professional, Scientific, and Technical Services	508	1.8	53,768
Public Administration	1,520	5.4	49,712
Real Estate and Rental and Leasing	176	0.6	43,524
Retail Trade	4,074	14.6	29,796
Transportation and Warehousing	1,910	6.8	56,472
Utilities	321	1.1	72,436
Wholesale Trade	890	3.2	49,920
Total	27,997	100.0%	43,840

== Transportation ==
=== Major highways ===
- I-95
- I-26
- US 15
- US 15 Conn.
- US 21
- US 21 Bus.
- US 21 Conn.
- US 176
- US 178
- US 178 Bus.
- US 301
- US 321
- US 601
- US 601 Truck
- SC 3
- SC 3 Bus.
- SC 4
- SC 6
- SC 6 Conn.
- SC 6 Truck
- SC 33
- SC 39
- SC 45
- SC 47
- SC 47 Truck
- SC 70
- SC 172
- SC 210
- SC 267
- SC 332
- SC 389
- SC 394
- SC 400
- SC 419
- SC 453
- SC 453 Truck

=== Railroads ===
At least four railroad lines run through Orangeburg County; a former Southern Railway Line, and three CSX lines, the westernmost which was formerly a Seaboard Air Line Railroad line running along US 321.

=== Major infrastructure ===
- North Air Force Auxiliary Field
- Orangeburg Municipal Airport

== Communities ==
=== City ===
- Orangeburg (county seat and largest community)

=== Towns ===
- Bowman
- Branchville
- Cope
- Cordova
- Elloree
- Eutawville
- Holly Hill
- Livingston
- Neeses
- North
- Norway
- Rowesville
- Santee
- Springfield
- Vance
- Woodford

=== Census-designated places ===
- Brookdale
- Edisto
- Wilkinson Heights

== State-recognized tribes ==
Orangeburg County is home to two state-recognized tribes.

- The Beaver Creek Indian Tribe, headquartered in Salley, is a nonprofit 501(c)(3) organization and state-recognized tribe, with members primarily located in Aiken County. The tribe was awarded this status by the South Carolina Commission for Minority Affairs on January 27, 2006. The tribe primarily claims descent from a family who settled in Long Cane Creek (McCormick County) from Virginia in 1760 with its South Carolina progenitor Lazarus Chavis born in Edgefield County. The entity is not presently federally recognized by the Bureau of Indian Affairs
- The Santee Indian Organization, headquartered in Holly Hill, is a nonprofit organization and state-recognized tribe. The tribe was awarded this status by the South Carolina Commission of Minority Affairs on March 15, 2006. The Santee Indian Organization claims descent from the historic Santee people, not to be confused with the similarly named Santee Dakota people. The tribe is not federally recognized.

== See also ==
- List of counties in South Carolina
- National Register of Historic Places listings in Orangeburg County, South Carolina

== Notes ==
1.^aThe 1890 federal census for South Carolina was almost entirely destroyed by a 1921 fire in Washington, D.C..
