= Aiken State Park =

State park in South Carolina, United States

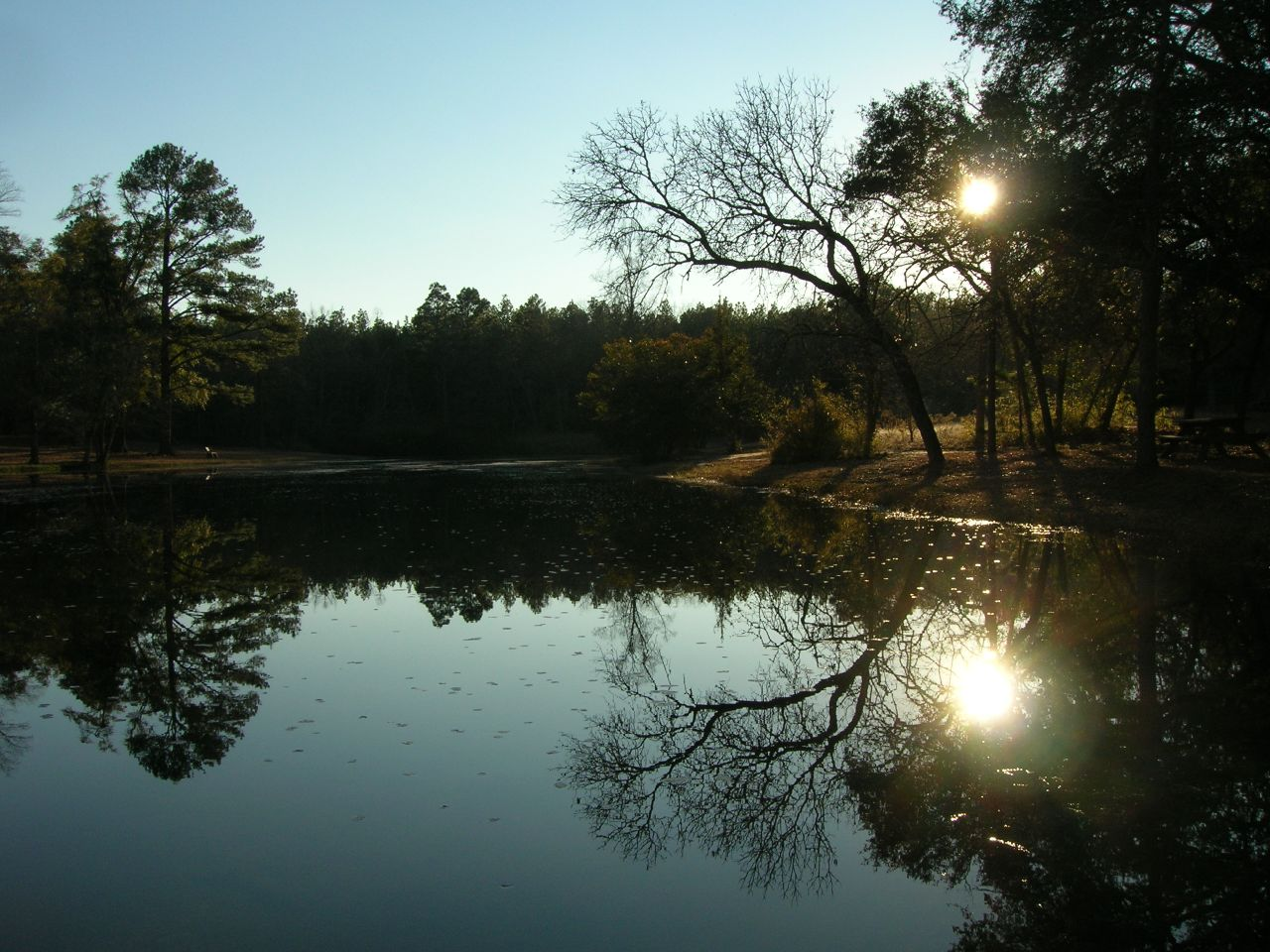
- Aiken State Park Lake
- Interactive map of Aiken State Park
- Location: 1145 State Park RD, Windsor, SC, 29856
- Nearest city: Windsor, SC
- Coordinates: 33°32′50″N 81°29′15″W
- Area: 1,067 acres (4 km^{2})
- Created: 1934
- Camp sites: tent and RV sites, primitive group camping area
- Hiking trails: 3-mile Jungle Trail loop
- Logo

Aiken State Park is a state park located near the town of Windsor in Aiken County, South Carolina.

== History ==
Built in 1934, Aiken State Park is one of the 16 original parks in South Carolina, built by an African American detachment of the Civilian Conservation Corps. Many of the original buildings are still in use.

== Activities and amenities ==
Activities available at the park include picnicking, fishing, bird watching, boating, swimming, geocaching, biking and camping. There are a few nature trails in the park as well.

Amenities include a playground, picnic shelters, horseshoe pits, a boat ramp on the Edisto River, a 1.7 mile canoe trail and a park store.

Visitors can rent fishing rods and reels, non-motorized fishing boats and canoes from the park office.
