= Edisto, Orangeburg County, South Carolina =

Edisto, South Carolina
- Unincorporated community
- Location within South Carolina Location within the United States
- Coordinates: 33°28′36″N 80°53′55″W
- Country: United States
- State: South Carolina
- County: Orangeburg
- Named after: Edisto people

Area
  - Total: 5.458 sq mi (14.14 km^{2})
  - Land: 5.418 sq mi (14.03 km^{2})
  - Water: 0.040 sq mi (0.10 km^{2})
- Elevation: 220 ft (67 m)

Population (2020)
  - Total: 2,058
  - Density: 379.8/sq mi (146.7/km^{2})
- Time zone: UTC-5 (Eastern (EST))
  - Summer (DST): UTC-4 (EDT)
- Area codes: 803, 839
- GNIS feature ID: 2402445

Edisto is an unincorporated community and census-designated place in Orangeburg County, South Carolina, United States. Its population was 2,058 as of the 2020 census. U.S. Route 601 passes through the community.

== Geography ==
According to the U.S. Census Bureau, the community has an area of 5.458 square miles (14.14 km^{2}); 5.418 square miles (14.03 km^{2}) of its area is land, and 0.040 square miles (0.10 km^{2}) is water.

== Demographics ==
Historical population
Census	Pop.	Note	%±
2000	2,632		—
2010	2,559		−2.8%
2020	2,058		−19.6%
U.S. Decennial Census; 2010 2020

=== 2020 census ===
Edisto CDP, South Carolina – Racial and ethnic composition Note: the US Census treats Hispanic/Latino as an ethnic category. This table excludes Latinos from the racial categories and assigns them to a separate category. Hispanics/Latinos may be of any race.
Race / Ethnicity (NH = Non-Hispanic)	Pop 2000	Pop 2010	Pop 2020	% 2000	% 2010	% 2020
White alone (NH)	745	579	457	28.31%	22.63%	22.21%
Black or African American alone (NH)	1,825	1,887	1,472	69.34%	73.74%	71.53%
Native American or Alaska Native alone (NH)	15	3	3	0.57%	0.12%	0.15%
Asian alone (NH)	12	4	6	0.46%	0.16%	0.29%
Native Hawaiian or Pacific Islander alone (NH)	0	0	0	0.00%	0.00%	0.00%
Other race alone (NH)	2	2	6	0.08%	0.08%	0.29%
Mixed race or Multiracial (NH)	13	16	64	0.49%	0.63%	3.11%
Hispanic or Latino (any race)	20	68	50	0.76%	2.66%	2.43%
Total	2,632	2,559	2,058	100.00%	100.00%	100.00%
