= Neeses, South Carolina =

- Town
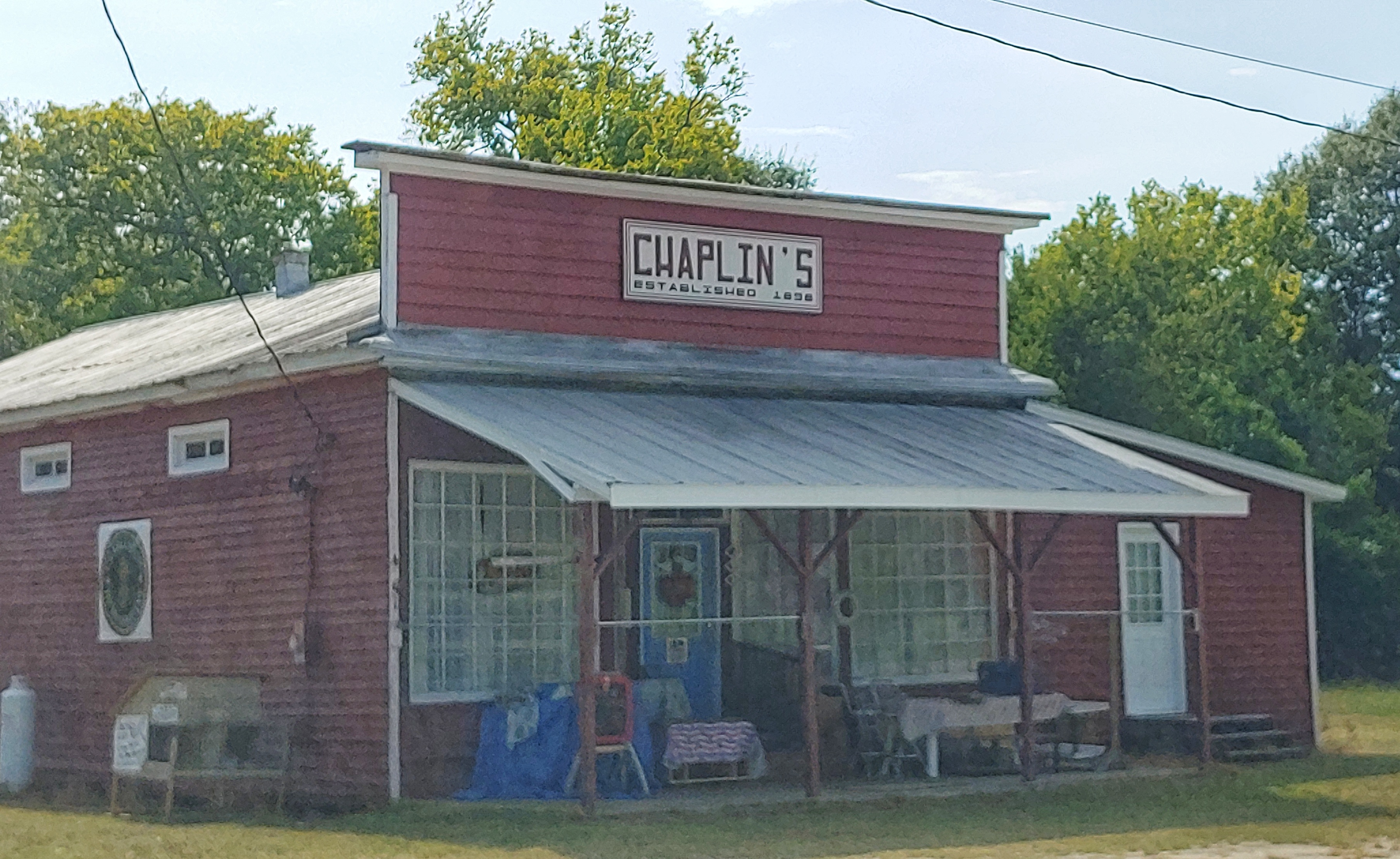
- Store building in Neeses

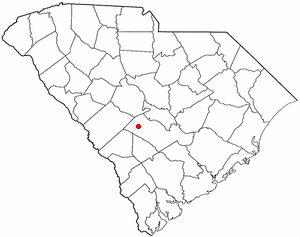
- Location of Neeses, South Carolina
- Coordinates: 33°32′11″N 81°07′32″W
- Country: United States
- State: South Carolina
- County: Orangeburg

Area
  - Total: 1.71 sq mi (4.42 km^{2})
  - Land: 1.71 sq mi (4.42 km^{2})
  - Water: 0 sq mi (0.00 km^{2})
- Elevation: 335 ft (102 m)

Population (2020)
  - Total: 320
  - Density: 187.5/sq mi (72.38/km^{2})
- Time zone: UTC-5 (Eastern (EST))
  - Summer (DST): UTC-4 (EDT)
- ZIP code: 29107
- Area codes: 803, 839
- FIPS code: 45-49390
- GNIS feature ID: 2406971

Neeses is a town in Orangeburg County, South Carolina, United States. The population was 320 at the 2020 census.

== History ==
Neeses was originally founded as Silver Springs, changing its name to its current form on September 29, 1898, to honor Mayor John W. Neese, who funded railway expansion through the town through a right of way sale in 1891.

John W. Neese had been postmaster of "Neeses", located in his mercantile store from 8/24/1886 until 5/23/1887, and postmaster of the Silver Spring post office from 11/4/1893 until 9/29/1898, when it was renamed "Neeses #2", since the town was renamed in his honor. The Neeses post office provides service to the people of Neeses and surrounding unincorporated areas, mainly in Elizabeth Township.

== Geography ==
According to the United States Census Bureau, the town has a total area of 1.7 square miles (4.4 km^{2}), all land.

== Demographics ==
Historical population
Census	Pop.	Note	%±
1910	143		—
1920	289		102.1%
1930	320		10.7%
1940	364		13.8%
1950	328		−9.9%
1960	347		5.8%
1970	388		11.8%
1980	557		43.6%
1990	410		−26.4%
2000	413		0.7%
2010	374		−9.4%
2020	320		−14.4%
U.S. Decennial Census

=== 2020 census ===
Neeses town, South Carolina – Racial and ethnic composition Note: the US Census treats Hispanic/Latino as an ethnic category. This table excludes Latinos from the racial categories and assigns them to a separate category. Hispanics/Latinos may be of any race.
Race / Ethnicity (NH = Non-Hispanic)	Pop 2000	Pop 2010	Pop 2020	% 2000	% 2010	% 2020
White alone (NH)	301	285	236	72.88%	76.20%	73.75%
Black or African American alone (NH)	86	75	63	20.82%	20.05%	19.69%
Native American or Alaska Native alone (NH)	9	2	5	2.18%	0.53%	1.56%
Asian alone (NH)	1	3	0	0.24%	0.80%	0.00%
Native Hawaiian or Pacific Islander alone (NH)	0	0	0	0.00%	0.00%	0.00%
Other race alone (NH)	0	0	1	0.00%	0.00%	0.31%
Mixed race or Multiracial (NH)	9	3	10	2.18%	0.80%	3.13%
Hispanic or Latino (any race)	7	6	5	1.69%	1.60%	1.56%
Total	413	374	320	100.00%	100.00%	100.00%

=== 2000 census ===
As of the census of 2000, there were 413 people, 175 households, and 110 families residing in the town. The population density was 245.9 inhabitants per square mile (94.9/km^{2}). There were 204 housing units at an average density of 121.5 per square mile (46.9/km^{2}). The racial makeup of the town was 74.33% White, 20.82% African American, 2.18% Native American, 0.24% Asian, 0.24% from other races, and 2.18% from two or more races. Hispanic or Latino of any race were 1.69% of the population.

There were 175 households, out of which 30.9% had children under the age of 18 living with them, 41.7% were married couples living together, 16.0% had a female householder with no husband present, and 36.6% were non-families. 32.6% of all households were made up of individuals, and 19.4% had someone living alone who was 65 years of age or older. The average household size was 2.36 and the average family size was 2.99.

In the town, the population was spread out, with 26.6% under the age of 18, 7.5% from 18 to 24, 28.3% from 25 to 44, 21.5% from 45 to 64, and 16.0% who were 65 years of age or older. The median age was 36 years. For every 100 females, there were 81.9 males. For every 100 females age 18 and over, there were 79.3 males.

The median income for a household in the town was $20,521, and the median income for a family was $24,125. Males had a median income of $23,500 versus $15,972 for females. The per capita income for the town was $11,377. About 28.5% of families and 29.4% of the population were below the poverty line, including 36.3% of those under age 18 and 24.4% of those age 65 or over.
