= Springfield, South Carolina =

- Town
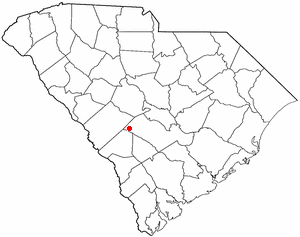
- Location of Springfield, South Carolina
- Coordinates: 33°29′58″N 81°16′46″W
- Country: United States
- State: South Carolina
- County: Orangeburg

Area
  - Total: 1.74 sq mi (4.50 km^{2})
  - Land: 1.74 sq mi (4.50 km^{2})
  - Water: 0 sq mi (0.00 km^{2})
- Elevation: 299 ft (91 m)

Population (2020)
  - Total: 455
  - Density: 261.6/sq mi (101.01/km^{2})
- Time zone: UTC-5 (Eastern (EST))
  - Summer (DST): UTC-4 (EDT)
- ZIP code: 29146
- Area codes: 803, 839
- FIPS code: 45-68470
- GNIS feature ID: 2407388
- Website: townofspringfield.sc.gov

Springfield is a town in Orangeburg County, South Carolina, United States. As of the 2020 census, Springfield had a population of 455.

== History ==
The Springfield High School was added to the National Register of Historic Places in 2001.

== Geography ==
According to the United States Census Bureau, the town has a total area of 1.6 square miles (4.0 km^{2}), all land.

== Demographics ==
Historical population
Census	Pop.	Note	%±
1890	221		—
1900	344		55.7%
1910	488		41.9%
1920	798		63.5%
1930	943		18.2%
1940	786		−16.6%
1950	782		−0.5%
1960	787		0.6%
1970	724		−8.0%
1980	604		−16.6%
1990	523		−13.4%
2000	504		−3.6%
2010	524		4.0%
2020	455		−13.2%
U.S. Decennial Census

=== 2020 census ===
Springfield town, South Carolina – Racial and ethnic composition Note: the US Census treats Hispanic/Latino as an ethnic category. This table excludes Latinos from the racial categories and assigns them to a separate category. Hispanics/Latinos may be of any race.
Race / Ethnicity (NH = Non-Hispanic)	Pop 2000	Pop 2010	Pop 2020	% 2000	% 2010	% 2020
White alone (NH)	350	316	267	69.44%	60.31%	58.68%
Black or African American alone (NH)	147	185	157	29.17%	35.31%	34.51%
Native American or Alaska Native alone (NH)	3	11	4	0.60%	2.10%	0.88%
Asian alone (NH)	0	4	6	0.00%	0.76%	1.32%
Native Hawaiian or Pacific Islander alone (NH)	0	0	0	0.00%	0.00%	0.00%
Other race alone (NH)	0	0	1	0.00%	0.00%	0.22%
Mixed race or Multiracial (NH)	0	4	10	0.00%	0.76%	2.20%
Hispanic or Latino (any race)	4	4	10	0.79%	0.76%	2.20%
Total	504	524	455	100.00%	100.00%	100.00%

=== 2000 census ===
As of the census of 2000, there were 504 people, 228 households, and 152 families residing in the town. The population density was 322.8 inhabitants per square mile (124.6/km^{2}). There were 263 housing units at an average density of 168.4 per square mile (65.0/km^{2}). The racial makeup of the town was 69.84% White, 29.37% African American, 0.60% Native American and 0.20% Asian. Hispanic or Latino of any race were 0.79% of the population.

There were 228 households, out of which 22.8% had children under the age of 18 living with them, 46.1% were married couples living together, 18.0% had a female householder with no husband present, and 33.3% were non-families. 31.6% of all households were made up of individuals, and 20.2% had someone living alone who was 65 years of age or older. The average household size was 2.21 and the average family size was 2.74.

In the town, the population was spread out, with 20.2% under the age of 18, 7.3% from 18 to 24, 22.4% from 25 to 44, 26.8% from 45 to 64, and 23.2% who were 65 years of age or older. The median age was 45 years. For every 100 females, there were 83.9 males. For every 100 females age 18 and over, there were 74.8 males.

The median income for a household in the town was $31,563, and the median income for a family was $40,833. Males had a median income of $35,833 versus $21,364 for females. The per capita income for the town was $19,285. About 4.0% of families and 5.8% of the population were below the poverty line, including 0.9% of those under age 18 and 12.7% of those age 65 or over.

== Education ==
Springfield has a public library, a branch of the Orangeburg County Library.

== Arts and culture ==
The town has also hosted the SC Governor's Frog Jump since 1969.
