= National Register of Historic Places listings in Edgefield County, South Carolina =

Location of Edgefield County in South Carolina

This is a list of the National Register of Historic Places listings in Edgefield County, South Carolina.

This is intended to be a complete list of the properties and districts on the National Register of Historic Places in Edgefield County, South Carolina, United States. The locations of National Register properties and districts for which the latitude and longitude coordinates are included below, may be seen in a map.

There are 11 properties and districts listed on the National Register in the county. Another 2 properties were once listed but have been removed.

This National Park Service list is complete through NPS recent listings posted April 18, 2025.

== Current listings ==
	Name on the Register	Image	Date listed	Location	City or town	Description
1	Bettis Academy and Junior College	Bettis Academy and Junior College	May 20, 1998 (#98000560)	Junction of Bettis Academy Rd. and Nicholson Rd. 33°39′30″N 81°51′32″W	Trenton	
2	Blocker House	Blocker House	May 14, 1971 (#71000771)	About 6 miles northwest of Edgefield on U.S. Route 25; 33°52′01″N 81°59′45″W	Edgefield	
3	Cedar Grove	Cedar Grove	October 14, 1971 (#71000772)	5 miles northwest of Edgefield on U.S. Route 25; 33°50′48″N 81°58′45″W	Edgefield	
4	Darby Plantation	Darby Plantation	August 13, 1974 (#74001851)	1150 Augusta Road; 33°44′58″N 81°52′58″W	Edgefield	
5	Edgefield Cotton Mill-Addison Mill		January 13, 2022 (#100007303)	100 CTC Dr. 33°47′10″N 81°55′33″W	Edgefield	
6	Edgefield Historic District	Edgefield Historic District	March 23, 1972 (#72001207)	Both sides of U.S. Route 25 through the town of Edgefield; 33°47′32″N 81°55′35″W	Edgefield	
7	Horn Creek Baptist Church	Horn Creek Baptist Church	May 6, 1971 (#71000773)	South of Edgefield; 33°43′15″N 81°56′11″W	Edgefield	
8	Johnston Historic District	Johnston Historic District	August 25, 1983 (#83002193)	Calhoun, Edisto, Lee, Mims, Jackson, Church, and Addison Sts. 33°49′58″N 81°48′04″W	Johnston	
9	Marshfield	Marshfield	January 9, 1995 (#94001561)	Youngblood Rd. northwest of Trenton; 33°45′25″N 81°52′06″W	Trenton	
10	Pottersville		January 17, 1975 (#75001698)	Address Restricted	Edgefield	
11	U.S. Highway 25		May 6, 2021 (#100006492)	Portions of Old US 25, Augusta Arbor Way, Calhoun Mountain, Frontage, Moki, Old Buncombe, Perimeter, and Old Augusta Rds. 33°53′24″N 82°01′19″W	Edgefield vicinity	Probably extends into other counties.

== Former listings ==
	Name on the Register	Image	Date listed	Date removed	Location	City or town	Description
1	Big Stevens Creek Baptist Church		May 6, 1971 (#71000774)	December 8, 2005	About 8 miles northwest of North Augusta on South Carolina Highway 230	North Augusta	Demolished
2	Paris Simkins House		April 5, 1984 (#84002044)	December 8, 2005	202 Gary Street	Edgefield	Demolished

== See also ==
- List of National Historic Landmarks in South Carolina
- National Register of Historic Places listings in South Carolina
