= Edgefield Historic District =

Edgefield Historic District may refer to:

- Edgefield Historic District (Edgefield, South Carolina), listed on the National Register of Historic Places in Edgefield County, South Carolina
- Edgefield Historic District (Nashville, Tennessee), listed on the National Register of Historic Places in Davidson County, Tennessee
