= Cedar Grove (Edgefield, South Carolina) =

Historic house in South Carolina, United States

- U.S. National Register of Historic Places
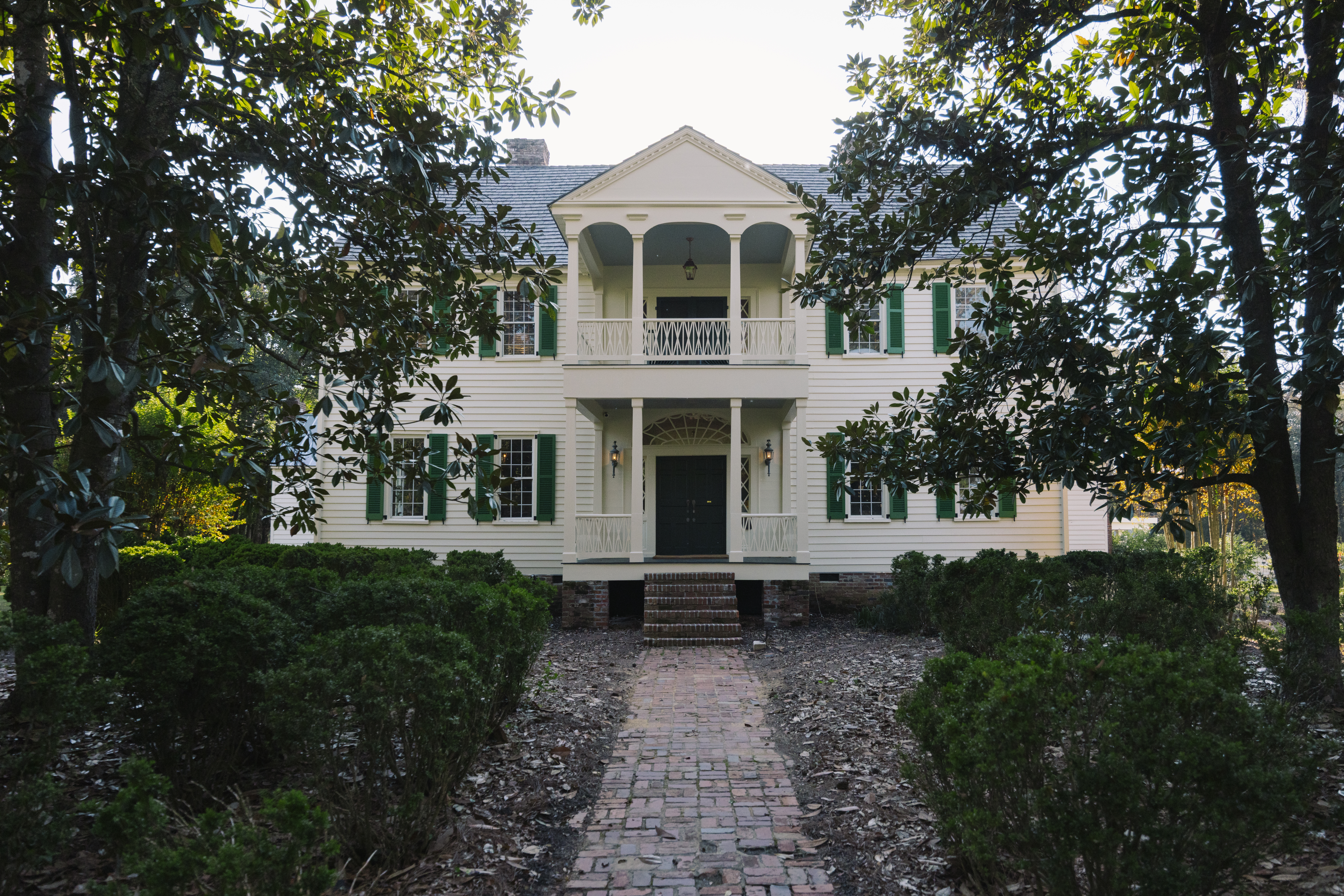

- Location within South Carolina Location within the United States
- Location: 5 miles northwest of Edgefield on U.S. Route 25, near Edgefield, South Carolina
- Coordinates: 33°50′48″N 81°58′45″W
- Area: 9.9 acres (4.0 ha)
- Built: c. 1790-1805
- Built by: Blocker, John Jr.
- Architectural style: Federal
- NRHP reference No.: 71000772
- Added to NRHP: October 14, 1971

Cedar Grove is a historic plantation house located near Edgefield, Edgefield County, South Carolina. It was built between 1790 and 1805, and is a large two-story, Federal style house with a white clapboard exterior and high gable roof. It features a double-tiered portico with delicate Adamesque detail. This home has many unusual architectural features including a barrel-vaulted hallway, elaborately carved mantelpieces, and the right front parlor retains an early hand-painted French wallpaper.

The property features a landscape of tall cedars, as well as old English boxwoods and traces of an original rose garden like at John Blocker's father's home, the Blocker House. The gardens at Cedar Grove were reputedly laid out by Andre Michaux, the renowned botanist who had designed the gardens at Middleton Place in Charleston, South Carolina. The famous English boxwoods of Cedar Grove were sold during the Great Depression to the Rockefeller family and placed in the gardens of the Governor's Palace in Williamsburg, Virginia.

Also on the property are the contributing servant's quarters and original kitchen.

It was listed on the National Register of Historic Places in 1971. As of 2024, it is owned by Brian Branton, an attorney and lobbyist, originally from North Carolina.
