= Johnston Historic District =

Historic district in South Carolina, United States

- U.S. National Register of Historic Places
- U.S. Historic district
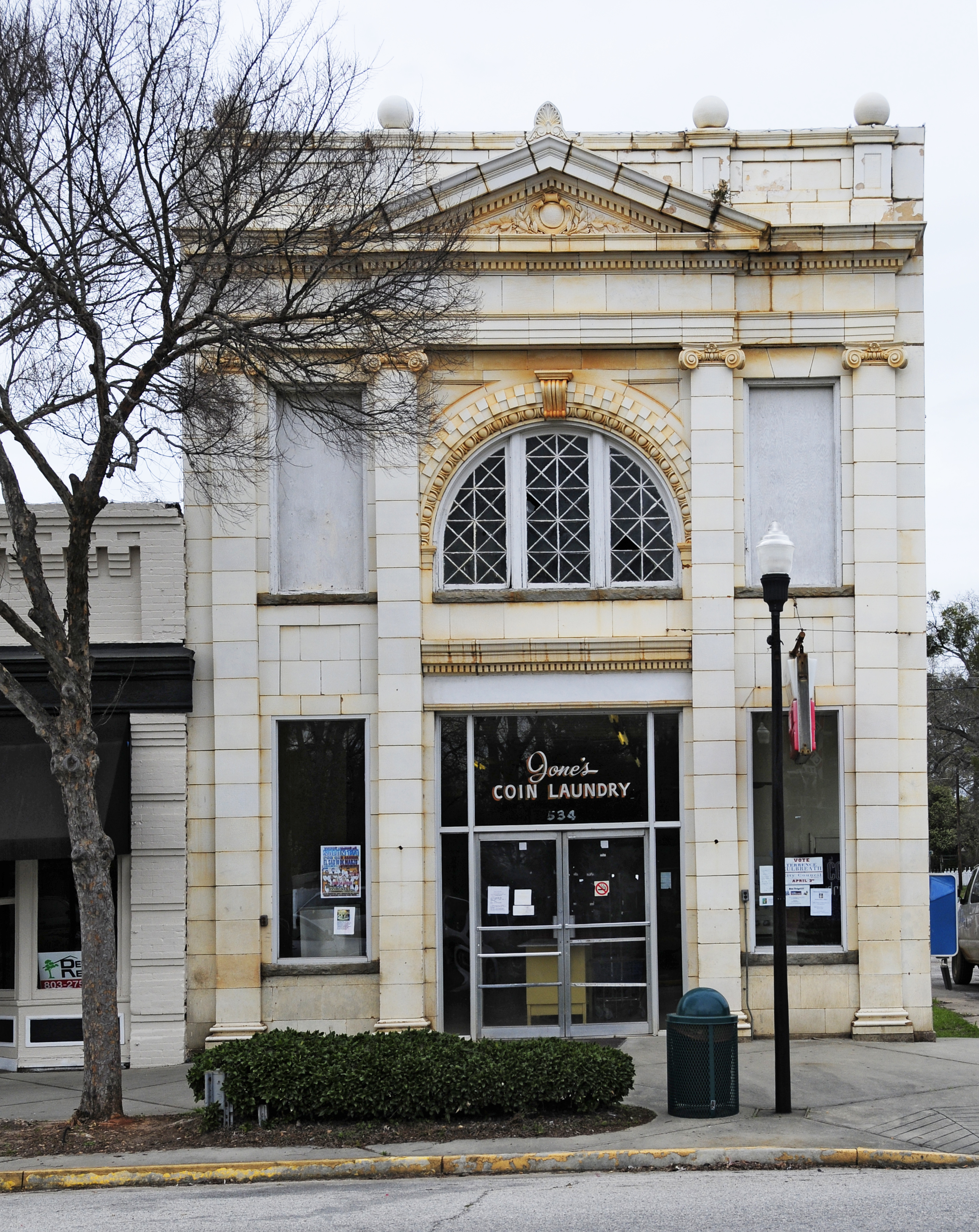
- Bank of Johnston, Johnston Historic District, March 2012

- Location within South Carolina Location within the United States
- Location: Calhoun, Edisto, Lee, Mims, Jackson, Church and Addison Sts., Edgefield, South Carolina
- Coordinates: 33°49′58″N 81°48′04″W
- Area: 132 acres (53 ha)
- Architect: Multiple
- Architectural style: Late Victorian
- NRHP reference No.: 83002193
- Added to NRHP: August 25, 1983

Johnston Historic District is a national historic district in Johnston, Edgefield County, South Carolina. The district encompasses 127 contributing buildings, 16 contributing sites, 1 contributing structure, and 1 contributing object in the village of Johnston. The district includes commercial and residential properties from approximately 1880 to 1920. They are in a variety of popular architectural styles such as Italianate, Second Empire, Victorian, Queen Anne, and Neo-Classical. The district also includes three churches and the town's cemetery. The railroad, which passes through Johnston, was the primary cause for the creation of the town and continues to be a reminder of the town's early transportation history. Notable buildings include the Johnston Depot, Western Carolina Bank, H. W. Crouch Building, Bank of Johnston (now Jone's Coin Laundry), Crouch-Halford House, and Johnston First Baptist Church.

It was listed on the National Register of Historic Places in 1983.
