= William Garrett Wright =

American poet, editor, writer

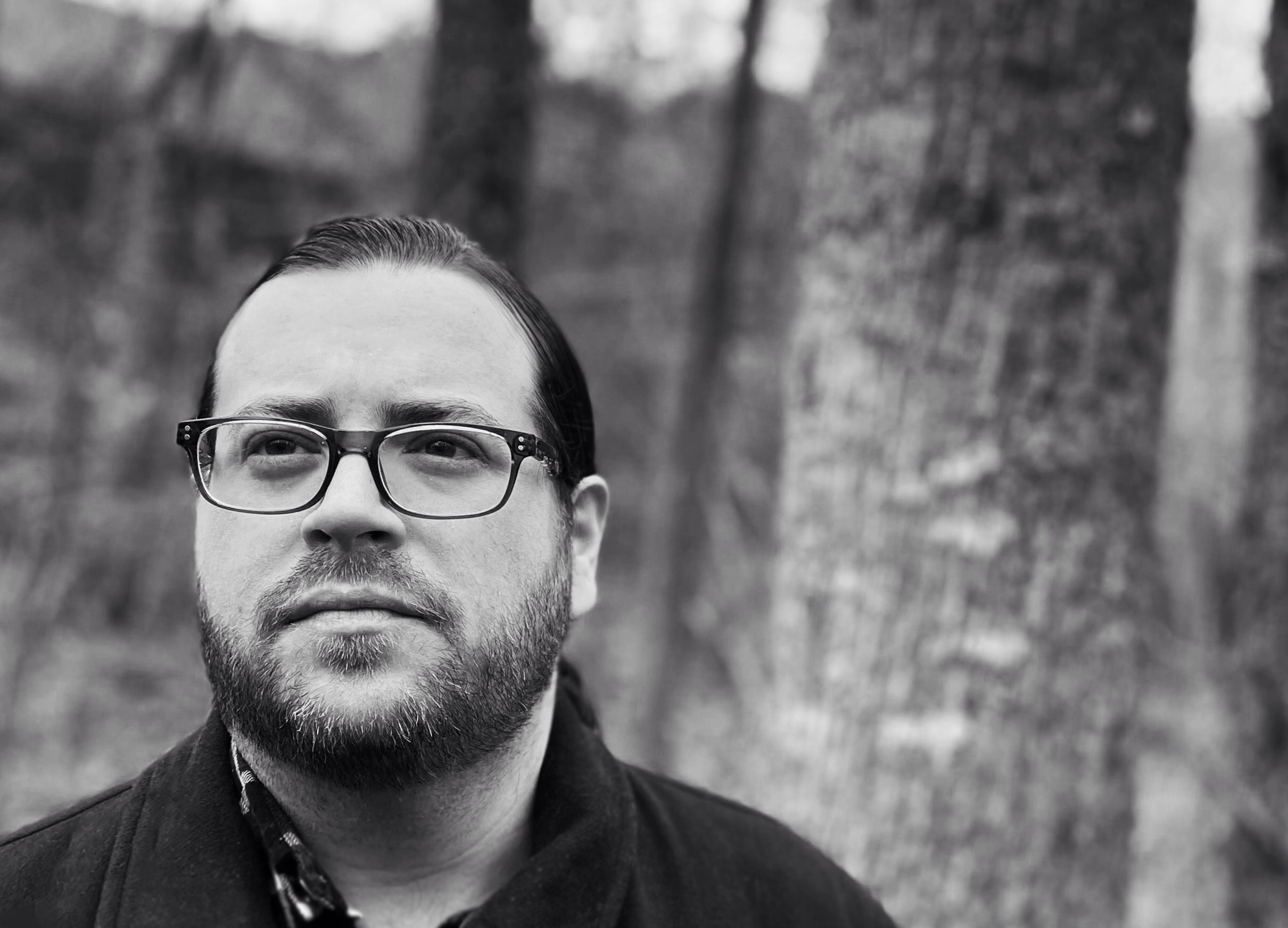
- Wright in 2020
- Born: Edgefield, South Carolina, U.S.
- Education: University of Southern Mississippi; Sam Houston State University; University of South Carolina Aiken
- Writing career
- Genre: Poetry

William Garrett Wright is an American poet, editor, and writer. Raised in Edgefield, South Carolina, Wright has worked as an educator at institutions such as Emory University, Oxford College at Emory University, and The University of Tennessee. His poems have been published in Oxford American, AGNI, Antioch Review, Kenyon Review, and Shenandoah, among others. His first book of poetry, Dark Orchard, was published in 2005. His third book, Tree Heresies, was released in 2015 and won Wright the 2016 Georgia Author of the Year (Poetry) award. Specter Mountain, a collaborative volume of poems written with Jesse Graves, won the Appalachian Book of the Year award in 2019.

== Life ==
Wright was born and raised in Edgefield, South Carolina. He earned a B.A. in English from the University of South Carolina Aiken, an M.A. in English from Sam Houston State University, and a Ph.D. in English (Creative Writing) from the University of Southern Mississippi.

In the spring of 2016, he served as University of Tennessee Department of English Writer-in-Residence.

Wright is the series editor for The Southern Poetry Anthology.

In 2024, Wright served as Best of Fest judge for the Poetry Society of Tennessee's 67th annual Poetry Festival.

== Selected bibliography ==
=== Poetry collections ===
- Grass Chapels: New and Selected Poems. Mercer University Press. ISBN 978-0881467994
- Tree Heresies. Mercer University Press. ISBN 978-0881465204
- Night Field Anecdote. Louisiana Literature Press. ISBN 978-0945083320
- Bledsoe. Texas Review Press. ISBN 978-1933896762
- Dark Orchard. Texas Review Press. ISBN 978-1881515852

=== Chapbooks ===
- April Creatures. Blue Horse Press. ISBN 978-0692303177
- Xylem & Heartwood. Finishing Line Press. ISBN 9781622294909
- Sleep Paralysis. Stepping Stone Press. ISBN 9781936641079
- The Ghost Narratives. Finishing Line Press. ISBN 978-1599243719

=== Collaborative full-length ===
- Specter Mountain. Mercer University Press. (Co-written with Jesse Graves), 2018. ISBN 978-0881466539
- Creeks of the Upper South. Jacar Press and Unicorn Press (jointly published). (Co-written with Amy Wright), 2016. ISBN 978-0877759492

=== As editor ===
- Broken Hallelujah: The New and Selected Poems of Jack Butler. Texas Review Press, 2015. ISBN 978-1933896960
- Why He Doesn’t Sleep: The Selected Poems of Stephen Gardner. Texas Review Press, 2013. ISBN 978-1937875633

=== As co-editor ===
- Hard Lines: Rough South Poetry. University of South Carolina Press, 2016. (Co-edited with Daniel Cross Turner). ISBN 978-1611176353
- The World Is Charged: Poetic Engagements with Gerard Manley Hopkins. Clemson University Press and Liverpool University Press, 2016 (Co-edited with Daniel Westover). ISBN 978-1942954200

=== As series editor and volume co-editor ===
- The Southern Poetry Anthology, Volume X: Alabama. Texas Review Press, 2023. ISBN 978-1-68003-326-7
- The Southern Poetry Anthology, Volume IX: Virginia. Texas Review Press, 2022. ISBN 978-1-68003-195-9
- The Southern Poetry Anthology, Volume VIII: Texas. Texas Review Press, 2018. ISBN 978-1680030631
- The Southern Poetry Anthology, Volume VII: North Carolina. Texas Review Press, 2014. ISBN 978-1937875879
- The Southern Poetry Anthology, Volume VI: Tennessee. Texas Review Press, 2013. (Co-edited with Jesse Graves & Paul Ruffin). ISBN 978-1937875459
- The Southern Poetry Anthology, Volume V: Georgia. Texas Review Press, 2012. (Co-edited with Paul Ruffin). ISBN 978-1933896939
- The Southern Poetry Anthology, Volume IV: Louisiana. Texas Review Press, 2011. (Co-edited with Paul Ruffin). ISBN 978-1933896779
- The Southern Poetry Anthology, Volume III: Contemporary Appalachia. Texas Review Press, 2010. (co-edited with Jesse Graves & Paul Ruffin). ISBN 978-1933896649
- The Southern Poetry Anthology, Volume II: Mississippi. Texas Review Press, 2010. (Co-edited with Stephen Gardner). ISBN 978-1933896243
- The Southern Poetry Anthology, Volume I: South Carolina. Texas Review Press, 2007. (Co-edited with Stephen Gardner). ISBN 978-1933896069
