= Marshfield =

Marshfield may refer to various places. In some instances, the name is a corruption of march, meaning a border.

== In the United Kingdom ==
- Marshfield, Gloucestershire, England
- Marshfield, Newport, Wales

== In the United States ==
- Marshfield, Indiana
- Marshfield, Maine
- Marshfield, Massachusetts, a town
  - Marshfield (CDP), Massachusetts, a census-designated place in the town
- Marshfield, Missouri
- Marshfield, New York
- Marshfield, Oregon (now Coos Bay since 1944)
- Marshfield (Trenton, South Carolina), listed on the National Register of Historic Places
- Marshfield, Vermont, a town
  - Marshfield (village), Vermont, in the town
- Marshfield, Wisconsin
  - Marshfield Clinic
- Marshfield Station, New Hampshire, at the base of the Mount Washington Cog Railway
