= Paris Simkins =

American politician

- Born: 1849
- Died: 1930 (aged 80–81)
- Occupations: African-American storekeeper, lawyer, minister, barber, and politician

Paris Simkins (1849-1930) was an African-American storekeeper, lawyer, minister, barber, and politician. Born into slavery, Simkins founded the Macedonia Baptist Church in Edgefield, South Carolina. A staunch Republican, he served in multiple governmental offices following the Civil War, including the South Carolina House of Representatives from 1872 to 1876.

== Biography ==
Simkins was born in 1849 to slavery in Edgefield County, South Carolina. He was the son of his white owner, newspaper editor Arthur Simkins, and his enslaved mother. In 1866, he and another formerly enslaved man wrote to Major General Daniel Sickles. In that letter, the men appealed "to the Government for protection." During Reconstruction, Simkins founded the Macedonia Baptist Church in the town of Edgefield. He was actively involved in politics during Reconstruction; he served as a lieutenant colonel in the South Carolina State Militia, town postmaster, and elected member of the South Carolina House of Representatives (1872-1876). While in the legislature, Simkins was admitted to and studied at the University of South Carolina, from which he graduated in 1876. In that election, former slaveholder and Confederate loyalist Wade Hampton III narrowly won the governorship, largely due to fraud and intimidation. Afterward, Simkins focused his efforts on building his church and organizing the Knights of Pythias of North America, South America, Europe, Asia, Africa and Australia fraternal organization in Edgefield. In 1885, he was admitted to the state bar, though he never practiced as a lawyer. Simkins is buried in the cemetery attached to the Macedonia Baptist Church in Edgefield, South Carolina.

In 1938, his grandson, Charles B. Bailey applied to the all-white University of South Carolina School of Law. Despite his grandfather having graduated from USC decades prior, Bailey's admission stalled. After months of being told it was "under consideration", a leading member of the university's board of trustees declared an unwillingness to admit non-whites. Bailey took a job with the United States Post Office and spearheaded the integration of post office letter carriers in Columbia in the 1940s.
