= David Drake (potter) =

19th-century ceramic artist from the United States

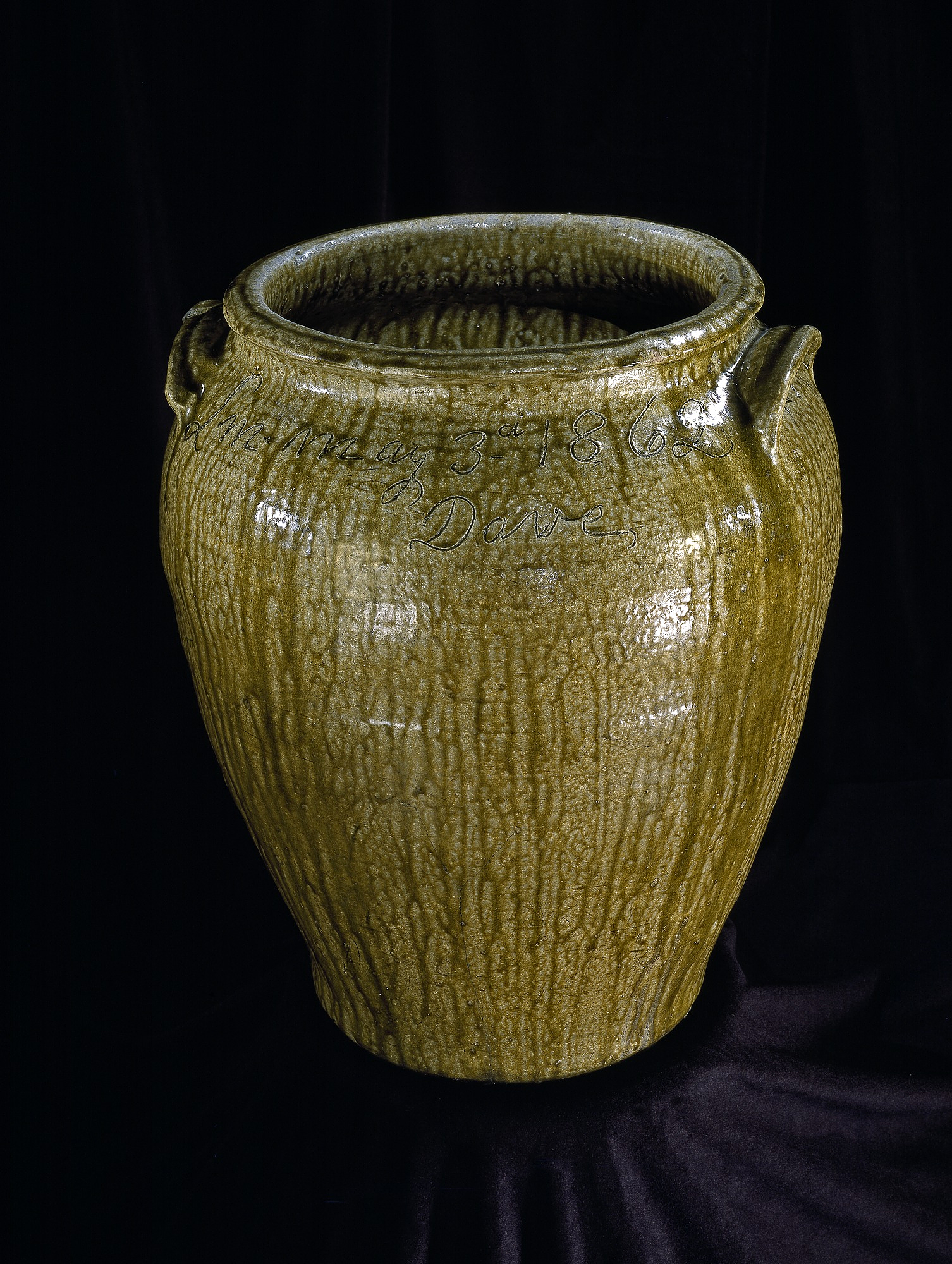
One of the many jars created by David Drake, this one is inscribed with Lm may 3rd 1862 / Dave

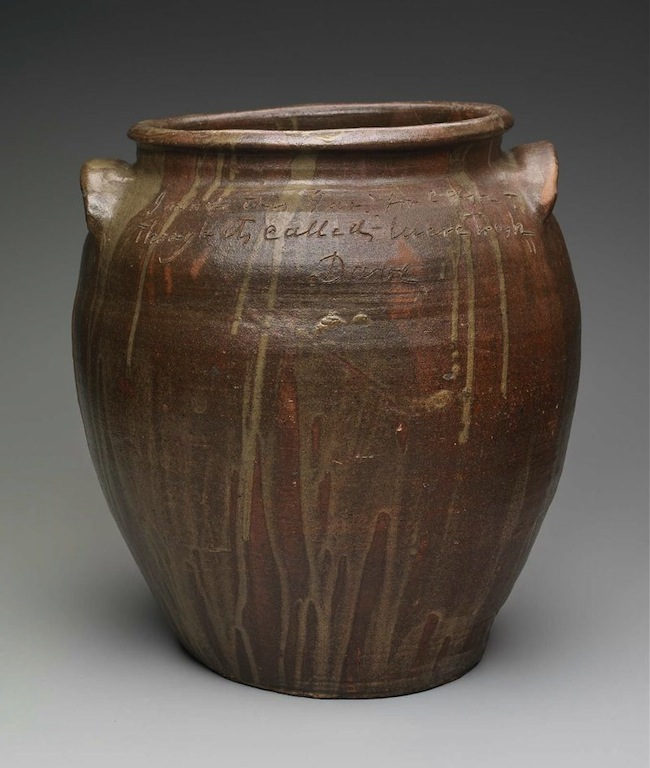
David Drake, I made this jar for cash, though it is called lucre trash, Alkaline glaze stoneware, 1857

David Drake (c. 1800 – c. 1870s), also known as "Dave Pottery" and "Dave the Potter", was an American potter who lived in Edgefield, South Carolina. Drake was enslaved for most of his life, but became free at the end of the American Civil War. He is thought to have died during the 1870s.

Drake produced alkaline-glazed stoneware jugs between the 1820s and the 1870s. He often signed his works "Dave", and he is recognized as the first enslaved potter known to inscribe his work. Drake inscribed his work with poetry, often using rhyming couplets, as well as with his signature. Most enslaved people were illiterate, often as a result of anti-literacy laws, making his inscriptions particularly notable.

== Life ==
David Drake is thought to have been born the first half of the year 1800 on a plantation in South Carolina, enslaved by the Drake family. The first legal record of Drake is from June 13, 1818, that describes "a boy about 17 years old country born" who was "mortgaged to Eldrid Simkins by Harvey Drake". The term "country born" refers to an enslaved African American born in the United States rather than in Africa. During the antebellum period, Drake was one of 76 enslaved African Americans known to have worked in Edgefield's 12 pottery factories.

David Drake was first enslaved by Harvey Drake, who owned a large pottery business with his business partner Abner Landrum. David is believed to have been born to one of eight slaves whom Landrum had brought to Edgefield from North Carolina. This pottery business, and the area within which David Drake worked, is known as Pottersville. Landrum was the publisher of a local newspaper called The Edgefield Hive. It is unclear how Drake learned to read and write. Scholars speculate he was taught by Landrum, who was known to be a religious man and may have taught Drake how to read the Bible. During this time period, it was punishable for enslaved people to be literate, especially in South Carolina. Most southern states in the early 1800s restricted black literacy, and in 1830s legislation was passed prohibiting this education. South Carolina's Negro Act of 1740, prohibited teaching enslaved Africans to read and write, punishable by a fine of 100 pounds and six months in prison. Another unclear detail about Drake's life is his missing leg. At an unknown point in his life, one of Drake's legs was amputated; it is speculated that he lost his leg after his owner severely beat him for inscribing his works. However, there is also evidence that his leg may have been amputated as a result of a train accident.

After the death of Harvey Drake in 1832, David was purchased by Harvey's brother Reuben, continuing to work at Pottersville until Reuben left Edgefield for Louisiana in 1835. Researchers believe that Dave remained in Edgefield because either he was too important a potter to leave Pottersville or that he was unable to make the journey due to his missing leg. He was eventually enslaved by Rev. John Landrum. In 1846, Rev. Landrum died and all 18 of the people he enslaved were put up for sale. Drake was then purchased and enslaved by Landrum's son, Franklin Landrum. Drake's treatment under Franklin Landrum was poor. During the period of his enslavement by Franklin Landrum, Drake's wares were not inscribed and no poetry is thought to have been produced.

In 1849, Lewis Miles bought and enslaved Drake. During the time Drake produced his largest amount of wares that included poetry The Miles factory was known as "Stony Bluff". Drake's poetry at this time increased from one every few years to three in 1857, eight in 1858, and seven in 1859.

At the end of the Civil War, Drake was a free man and is thought to have taken the surname "Drake" from his first owner, Harvey Drake. The name "David Drake" is recorded in the 1870 United States Census as "David Drake, Turner". It is thought that Drake died during the 1870s, since neither the names "David Drake" nor "Dave Drake" appear in the 1880 census.

== Pottery and work ==
Drake's earliest recorded work is a pot dated July 12, 1834. The poetry on this vessel reads:

Put every bit all between
Surely this jar will hold 14

Drake scholar Jill Beute Koverman argues that Drake "made more than 40,000 pieces over his lifetime." Twenty of Drake's jars and jugs are inscribed with original poetry and 50 additional vessels reveal his signature, maker's mark, date, and other inscriptions. Drake's jars are bulbous in form, similar to most ware produced in antebellum Edgefield. Drake is known for the massive size of his ware and the largest jar attributed to him holds 40 US gallons (150 L) and measures 29 inches (74 cm) tall, with a circumference of 85 inches (220 cm). One marker of Drake's work is that his jars are widest at the top.

One of Drake's better known pieces, a 19-inch greenware pot that dates back to August 16, 1857, includes the following description:

I wonder where is all my relations
Friendship to all and every nation

Drake commonly used 25–40-US-gallon (95–150 L) jugs, which he frequently adorned with short poems and couplets below the rim of the jar. Some of these were explanatory "Put every bit all between / surely this jar will hold 14"; and some, like the one above, were commentaries on the institution of slavery. The well known inscription, "I wonder where is all my relations / Friendship to all—and every nation", demonstrates Drake questioning his heritage and personal history. This contemplation signifies Drake's positivity despite facing the many brutalities of slavery, including the loss of personal identity. It is believed that the inscriptions Drake included on his works were used as a method of personal expression, communication with other slaves, and even defiance to the institution of slavery. Some collectors and scholars have suggested that Drake's poetry should be characterized as an early act of sedition in the cause of civil rights, because at the time it was generally forbidden for African-Americans to read and write. Pieces by Drake frequently feature the initials "LM." This stood for Lewis Miles, the man who owned the pottery workshop where Drake worked (Miles may have enslaved Dave for a time, starting in the late 1830s). Lewis Miles has even been referenced directly in one of Drake's couplets: "Dave belongs to Mr. Miles / Wher the oven bakes & the pot biles."

During Drake's lifetime, his pots were worth around 50 cents but their modern value is much higher. In contemporary auctions and sales, his regular work has sold for over $40,000 per piece. In 2012, one of Drake's pieces, a butter churn with the inscription, "This is a noble churn / fill it up it will never turn," sold for $130,000 at a Charlton Hall Auction in South Carolina. In 2021, an inscribed jar sold for $1.56 million (~$1.83 million in 2025) at auction, a world auction record for American pottery. In 2020, an attributed inscription jar sold for $369,000 (~$451,638 in 2025) at a Brunk's Auction in Asheville, North Carolina.

=== Trust ===
Descendents of Drake formed the Dave the Potter Legacy Trust in the early 2020s, to celebrate his legacy and to claim ownership of his pots as a form of restitution.

=== Collections ===
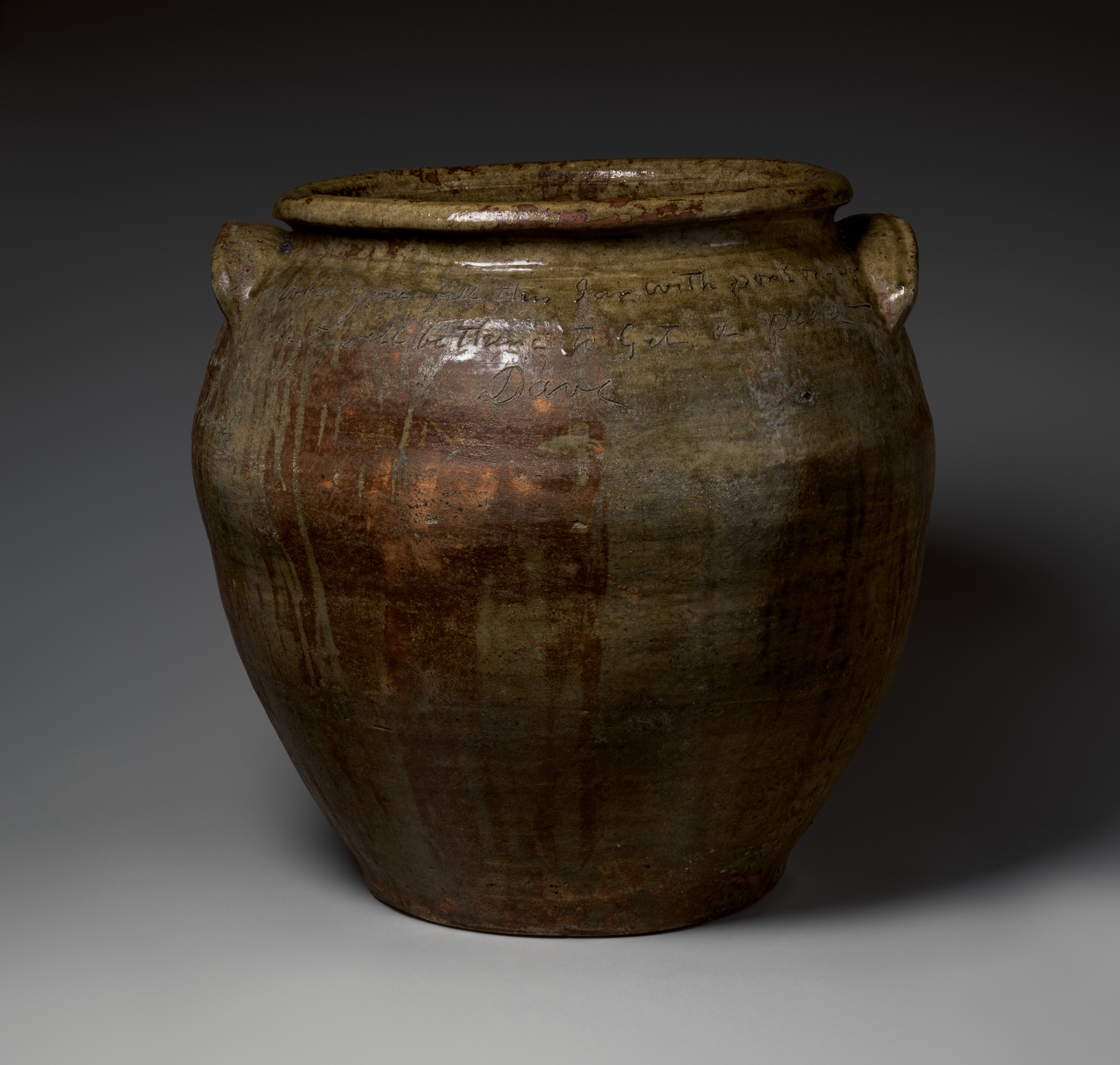
Storage jar - 1858 - in Metropolitan Museum of Art collection

The 1998 exhibition The Life and Works of the Enslaved African American Potter, Dave at University of South Carolina's McKissick Museum was the first exhibition devoted solely to Drake's pottery.

Drake's work is in the permanent collections of the Smithsonian's National Museum of American History and the National Gallery of Art in Washington, the Philadelphia Museum of Art, the Museum of Fine Arts, Boston, the Art Institute of Chicago, the De Young Museum in San Francisco, the Saint Louis Art Museum, the Metropolitan Museum of Art, the Morris Museum of Art (Augusta, GA), the International African American Museum in Charleston, South Carolina, the Southern Collection of the Greenville County Museum of Art (Greenville, SC), the McKissick Museum at the University of South Carolina, the Daughters of the American Revolution Museum (Washington, DC), and the North Carolina Museum of Art in Raleigh. His work was displayed by the Metropolitan Museum of Art from 2022 to 2023 as part of the Hear Me Now: The Black Potters of Old Edgefield, South Carolina exhibition.

In 2025, the Boston Museum of Fine Arts returned two pots within their collection that were crafted by Drake to his descendants' trust. This act was the first time that art from an enslaved African American had been repatriated by a major American art museum. In September 2026, Milwaukee Art Museum returned two pots from their collection to the trust; immediately repurchasing one, and holding the other on long-term loan.

In October 2026, Dave’s descendants requested that the Philadelphia Museum of Art return his work Storage Jar created in 1859 to their trust.

In November 2026, the Newark Museum of Art decided to transfer an 1852 jug by Drake in its collection to the artist's descendants.

== Bibliography ==
In 2008, Leonard Todd published a cohesive biography on Drake. Leonard Todd's interest lies in the fact that his ancestors had enslaved Drake.

In 2010, the children's book Dave the Potter: Artist, Poet, Slave was written by Laban Carrick Hill and illustrated by Bryan Collier. The book gives a biography of Drake and discusses his talent for creating pottery. It won the Coretta Scott King Award and was a Caldecott Honor book in 2011. That same year, contemporary artist Theaster Gates created an exhibition responding to and centering around the work of David Drake, titled Theaster Gates: To Speculate Darkly, at the Milwaukee Art Museum. In this exhibition, Gates used Drake's work to address issues of craft and race in African-American history.

In 2013, author Andrea Cheng published the middle grade novel Etched in Clay: The Life of Dave, Enslaved Potter and Poet offering a biographical look at Drake's life.

In 2023, a new book on his life and work, Praise Songs for Dave the Potter: Art and Poetry for David Drake, was published by academic Gabrielle Foreman through University of Georgia Press.

== See also ==
- Thomas Commeraw
- List of enslaved people
