= Daniel A. Tompkins =

American engineer and industrialist

- Born: Daniel Augustus Tompkins; October 12, 1851
- Died: October 18, 1914 (aged 63)
- Education: University of South Carolina, Rensselaer Polytechnic Institute
- Occupations: Industrialist, engineer
- Known for: Founding textile mills
- Notable work: Cotton Mill, Commercial Features

Daniel Augustus Tompkins (12 October 1851 – 18 October 1914) was an American engineer, industrialist, and journalist.

== Early life and education ==
Tompkins was born 12 October 1851 to DeWitt Clinton and Hannah Virginia Smyly Tompkins. He attended Edgefield Academy as a youth. He expressed desire in the field of Engineering since a young age.

Tompkins entered the University of South Carolina in 1867. In 1869, he transferred to Rensselaer Polytechnic Institute to study Civil engineering. During school vacations, Tompkins would work as a drafter for John A. Griswold and Company. He graduated in 1873 with a Civil Engineering degree.

== Career ==
Shortly after graduation, Tompkins became a master machinist with Bethlehem Iron Works in Pennsylvania. The factory head, saw how good Tompkins was at his job and, in 1877, he sent Tompkins to Germany to oversee the foundation of Schwerte Iron Works.

Following his return to the United States in 1879, he reestablished his employment at Bethlehem Iron Works. In 1881, he went to become a master machinist for the Crystal Plate Glass Company in Crystal City, Missouri. In 1883, he came to Charlotte with the Westinghouse Machinery Company.

In 1899, he published Cotton Mill, Commercial Features. In 1899, Tompkins's textile juggernaut led to his appointment by President William McKinley to the U.S. Industrial Commission.

By 1910, he played a role in starting more than 250 cotton oil mills, 150 electric plants, and 100 cotton mills. He was opposed to labor regulations and favored efficiency.

== Death ==
On 18 October 1914, Tompkins died from a paralytic condition. The former Textile Building at North Carolina State University is named in honor of him. Former Daniel A. Tompkins Company Machine Shop is a historic factory building located at Charlotte, Mecklenburg County, North Carolina.
