= Edgefield Advertiser =

South Carolina newspaper

- Owner: Suzanne Gile Mims Derrick
- Managing editor: Sandra Reece
- Founded: 1836
- Headquarters: 117 Courthouse Sq. Edgefield, SC 29824
- OCLC number: 10722626
- Website: edgefieldadvertiser.com

The Edgefield Advertiser is a newspaper published in Edgefield, South Carolina. Founded in February 11, 1836, it is the oldest newspaper in South Carolina to publish continuously under the same nameplate.

== History ==
The predecessor to the Edgefield Advertiser was the Anti-Monarchist and South-Carolina Advertiser, first published by Thomas M. Davenport on May 27, 1811. After the War of 1812, Davenport sold the newspaper to Benjamin McNary who changed its name to South-Carolina Republican. In 1824, he sold the newspaper to John Lofton and Abner Landrum.

In 1829, the newspaper was sold again to Francis Hugh Wardlaw, John Bacon, and Warren Mays. At some point the newspaper was acquired by James Parsons Carroll who changed the paper's name to the Edgefield Carolinian.

In 1836, the newspaper was bought Maximillian LaBorde and James Jones, who changed its name to the Edgefield Advertiser.

William Walton Mims assumed control of the newspaper in 1937 and ran it until retiring at the end of 2002. His daughter Suzanne Gile Mims Derrick became editor on January 1, 2003.
