= Trenton, South Carolina =

- Town
- Location of Trenton in Edgefield County, South Carolina

- Location in South Carolina Location in the United States
- Coordinates: 33°44′23″N 81°50′25″W
- Country: United States
- State: South Carolina
- County: Edgefield

Area
  - Total: 1.27 sq mi (3.30 km^{2})
  - Land: 1.26 sq mi (3.27 km^{2})
  - Water: 0.015 sq mi (0.04 km^{2})
- Elevation: 620 ft (189 m)

Population (2020)
  - Total: 200
  - Density: 158.6/sq mi (61.24/km^{2})
- Time zone: UTC-5 (Eastern (EST))
  - Summer (DST): UTC-4 (EDT)
- ZIP code: 29847
- Area codes: 803, 839
- FIPS code: 45-72520
- GNIS feature ID: 1251201

Trenton is a town in Edgefield County, South Carolina, United States. As of the 2020 census, Trenton had a population of 200.

== History ==
Bettis Academy and Junior College and Marshfield, a historic plantation house with outbuilding and cemetery, are listed on the National Register of Historic Places.

Painter Wenonah Bell was born in Trenton.

== Geography ==
Trenton is located in eastern Edgefield County at 33°44′23″N 81°50′25″W (33.739721, -81.840208). South Carolina Highway 121 passes through the western side of the town, intersecting U.S. Route 25 at the southwest corner of the town. US 25 leads northwest 6 miles (10 km) to Edgefield, the county seat, and southwest 20 miles (32 km) to Augusta, Georgia, while SC 121 leads northeast 8 miles (13 km) to Johnston.

According to the United States Census Bureau, Trenton has a total area of 1.27 square miles (3.30 km^{2}), of which 0.02 square miles (0.04 km^{2}), or 1.17%, is water.

== Demographics ==
Historical population
Census	Pop.	Note	%±
1890	302		—
1900	266		−11.9%
1910	257		−3.4%
1920	271		5.4%
1930	369		36.2%
1940	408		10.6%
1950	296		−27.5%
1960	314		6.1%
1970	362		15.3%
1980	404		11.6%
1990	303		−25.0%
2000	226		−25.4%
2010	196		−13.3%
2020	200		2.0%
U.S. Decennial Census

== 2000 census ==
As of the census of 2000, there were 226 people, 103 households, and 67 families residing in the town. The population density was 173.9 inhabitants per square mile (67.1/km^{2}). There were 115 housing units at an average density of 88.5 per square mile (34.2/km^{2}). The racial makeup of the town was 69.47% White and 30.53% African American. Hispanic or Latino of any race were 3.10% of the population.

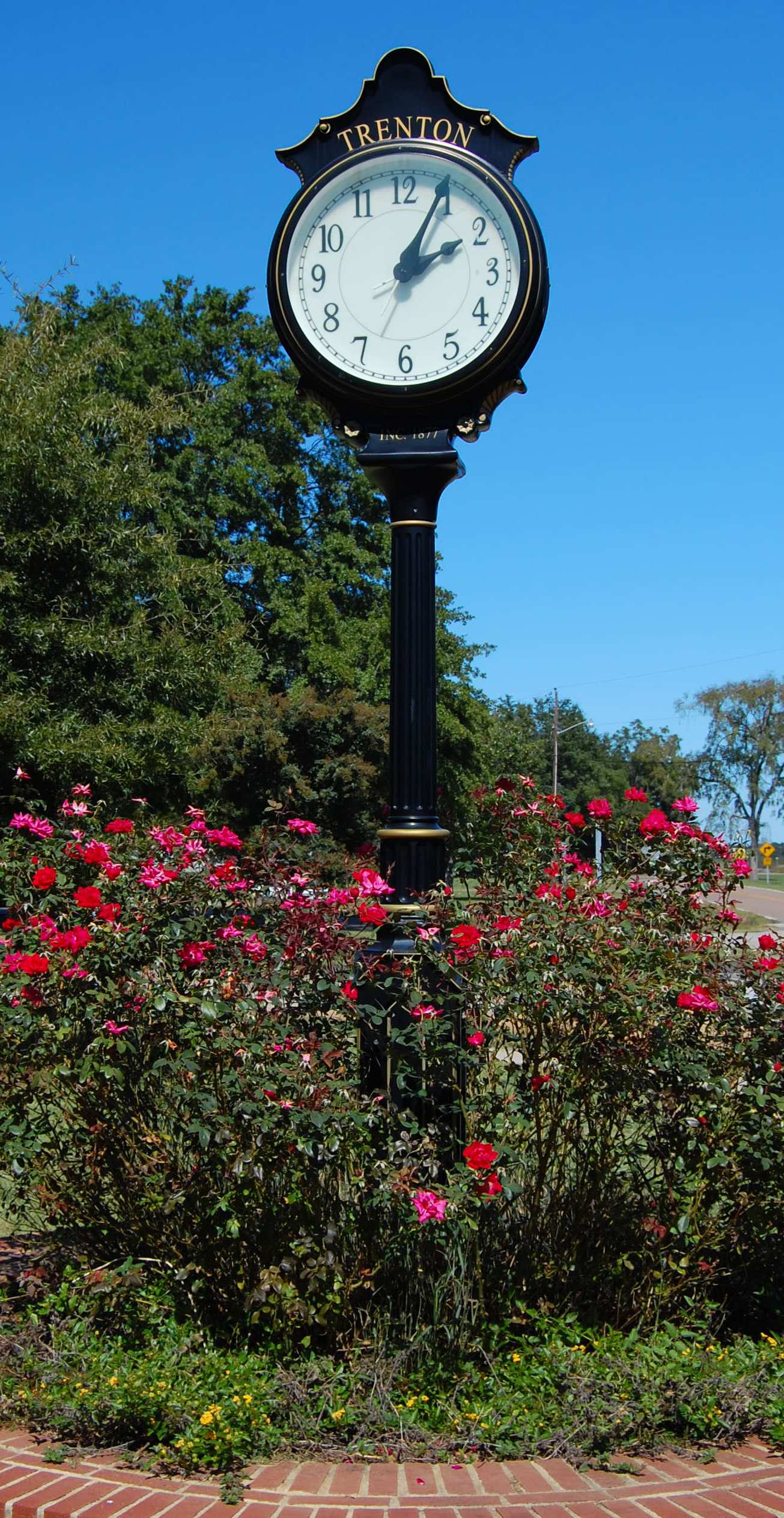
Clock in downtown Trenton

There were 103 households, out of which 19.4% had children under the age of 18 living with them, 42.7% were married couples living together, 19.4% had a female householder with no husband present, and 34.0% were non-families. 32.0% of all households were made up of individuals, and 15.5% had someone living alone who was 65 years of age or older. The average household size was 2.19 and the average family size was 2.69.

The town's population distribution was as follows: 18.6% were under the age of 18, 7.1% were between 18 and 24, 23.5% were between 25 and 44, 31.4% were between 45 and 64, and 19.5% were 65 years or older. The median age was 45 years. Among the population, there were 93.2 males for every 100 females, and among those aged 18 and over, the ratio was 93.7 males per 100 females.

The median income for a household in the town was $26,250, and the median income for a family was $41,667. Males had a median income of $31,875 versus $29,583 for females. The per capita income for the town was $17,352. About 30.8% of families and 27.1% of the population were below the poverty line, including 41.7% of those under the age of eighteen and 20.0% of those 65 or over.

== 2010 census ==
According to the 2010 census, Trenton had a population of 196. Of the population, 129 (65.8%) were White, 62 (31.6%) were Black or African American, 8 (4.1%) were Hispanic or Latino (of any race), 0 (0%) were American Indian or Alaska Native, 0 (0%) were Asian, 0 (0%) were Pacific Islanders, 5 (2.6%) were some other race, and 0 (0%) were of two or more races.

== Notable people ==
- David E. Harris, the first African American commercial airline pilot and pilot captain for a major U.S. commercial airline.
- Benjamin Tillman, United States Senator from South Carolina and Governor of South Carolina.
