= Bettis Academy and Junior College =

Historic school complex in South Carolina, United States

- U.S. National Register of Historic Places
- U.S. Historic district
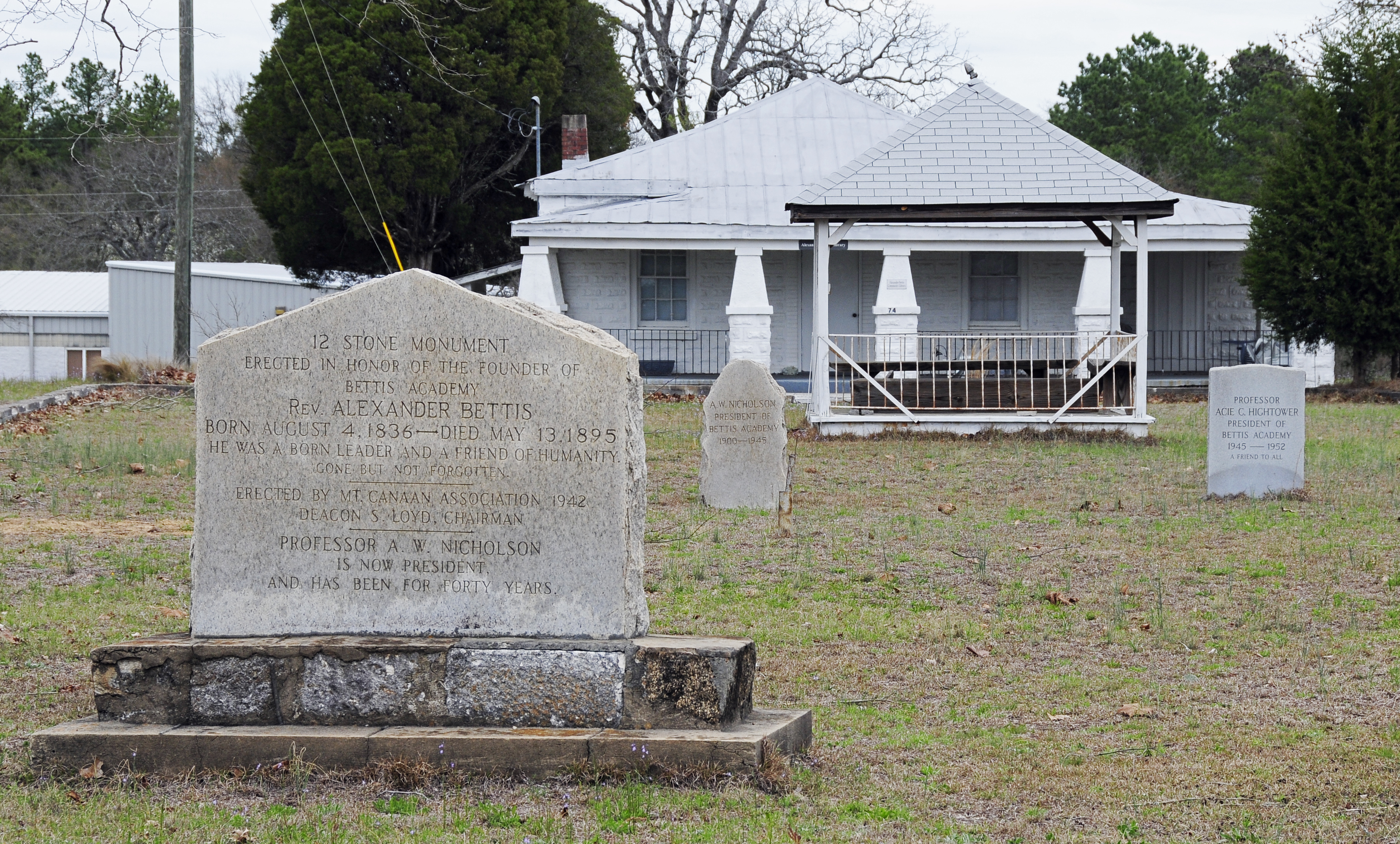
- Bettis Academy and Junior College, March 2012

- Location within South Carolina Location within the United States
- Location: Junction of Bettis Academy Rd. and Nicholson Rd., near Trenton, South Carolina
- Coordinates: 33°39′30″N 81°51′31″W
- Area: 2.8 acres (1.1 ha)
- Built: 1935, 1939, 1942
- Architectural style: Bungalow/craftsman
- NRHP reference No.: 98000560
- Added to NRHP: May 20, 1998

Bettis Academy and Junior College is a historic African-American Baptist school complex and national historic district located near Trenton, Edgefield County, South Carolina. Bettis Academy and Junior College was established in 1881 and closed in 1952. The complex now consists of three contributing buildings and one contributing site, all dating from the last 20 years of the institution. The remaining buildings are the rock-faced Alexander Bettis Community Library (1939); a bungalow-form building with a dual-pitched pyramidal roof; the stuccoed brick Classroom Building (1935); and the rock-faced Colonial Revival style Biddle Hall (1942).

The library was originally the Iowa City Unit of the Faith Cabin Libraries that was built by the students. It was later named the Alexander Bettis Community Library.

It was listed on the National Register of Historic Places in 1998.
