= Blocker House (Edgefield, South Carolina) =

Historic house in South Carolina, United States

- U.S. National Register of Historic Places
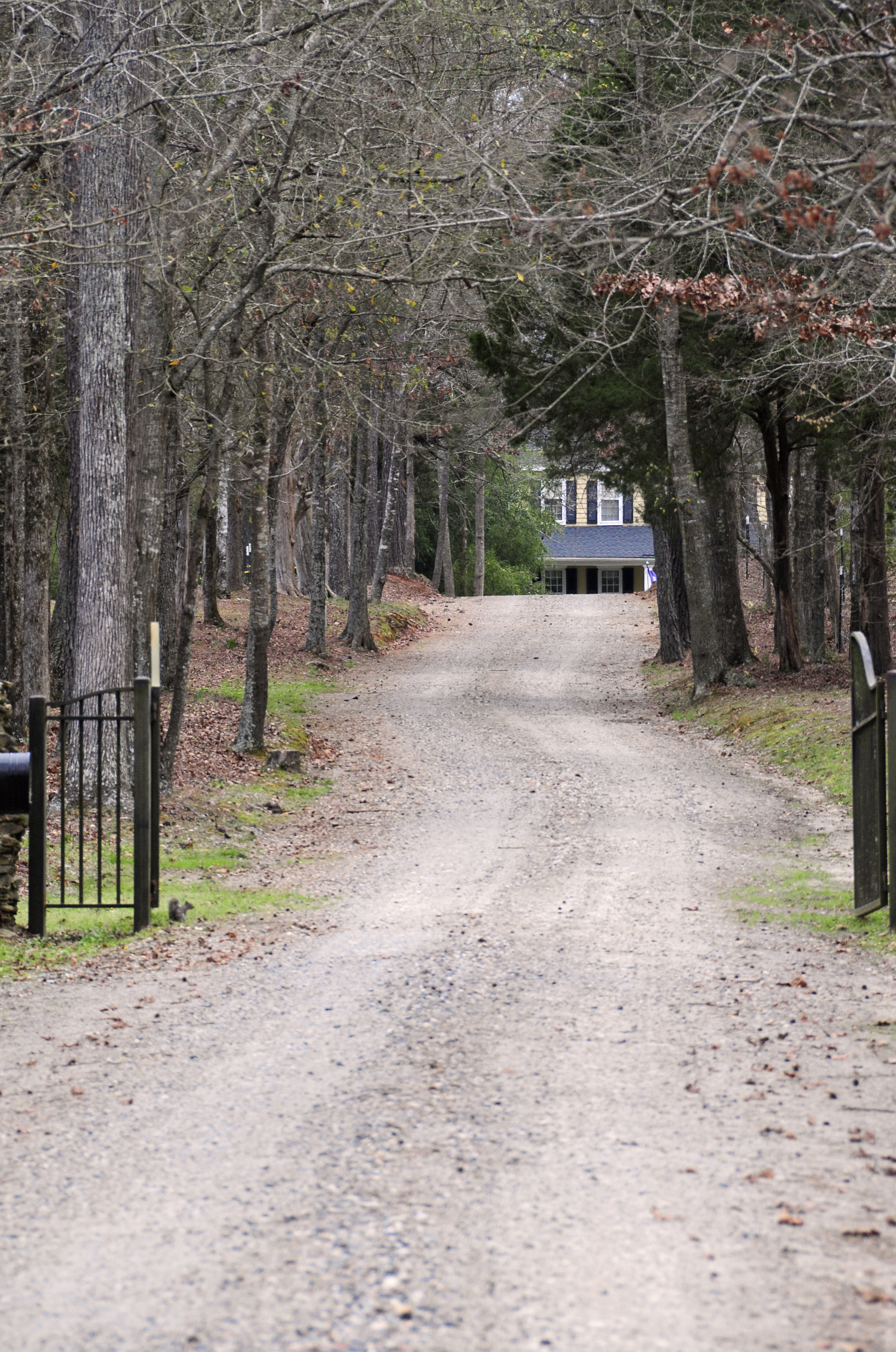

- Location within South Carolina Location within the United States
- Location: About 6 miles northwest of Edgefield on U.S. Route 25, near Edgefield, South Carolina
- Coordinates: 33°52′1″N 81°59′45″W
- Area: 9.9 acres (4.0 ha)
- Built: 1775-1790 by John Blocker, Sr.
- NRHP reference No.: 71000771
- Added to NRHP: May 14, 1971

The Blocker House is a historic plantation house located near Edgefield, Edgefield County, South Carolina built circa 1790 by John Blocker, Sr. It is a two-story, clapboard dwelling with a one-story shed-roofed porch supported by four square columns. The property includes centuries old magnolia and cedar trees, a family cemetery, and several outbuildings.

It was listed on the National Register of Historic Places in 1971.
