= Edgefield Historic District (Edgefield, South Carolina) =

Historic district in South Carolina, United States

- U.S. National Register of Historic Places
- U.S. Historic district
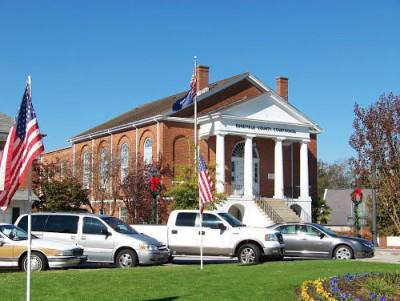
- Edgefield County Courthouse

- Location within South Carolina Location within the United States
- Location: Both sides of U.S. 25 through town of Edgefield, Edgefield, South Carolina
- Coordinates: 33°49′58″N 81°48′04″W
- Area: 480 acres (190 ha)
- Architects: Niernsee, John R.
- Architectural style: Greek Revival, Gothic, Georgian
- NRHP reference No.: 72001207
- Added to NRHP: March 23, 1972

Edgefield Historic District is a national historic district located at Edgefield, Edgefield County, South Carolina. The district encompasses 33 contributing buildings, 6 contributing sites, and 1 contributing object in the town of Edgefield. The buildings center on the landscaped village green, and includes forty 19th century buildings, three of which are house museums. There are a number of 19th century Greek Revival style homes, while others are noted for beautiful Federal style fanlights and unusual doorways. Other district properties include Victorian influenced homes and downtown commercial buildings. Five churches represent the Georgian, Victorian Gothic, and modified Gothic architectural styles. Notable buildings include the Edgefield County Courthouse, Trinity Episcopal Church and Rectory, St. Mary's Catholic Church (designed by John R. Niernsee), Halcyon Grove, Oakley Park, Carroll Hill, Blocker House, Yarborough House, and Padgett House.

It was listed on the National Register of Historic Places in 1972.

It is the birthplace of Confederate general James Longstreet.
