= Amy Wright (writer) =

American writer

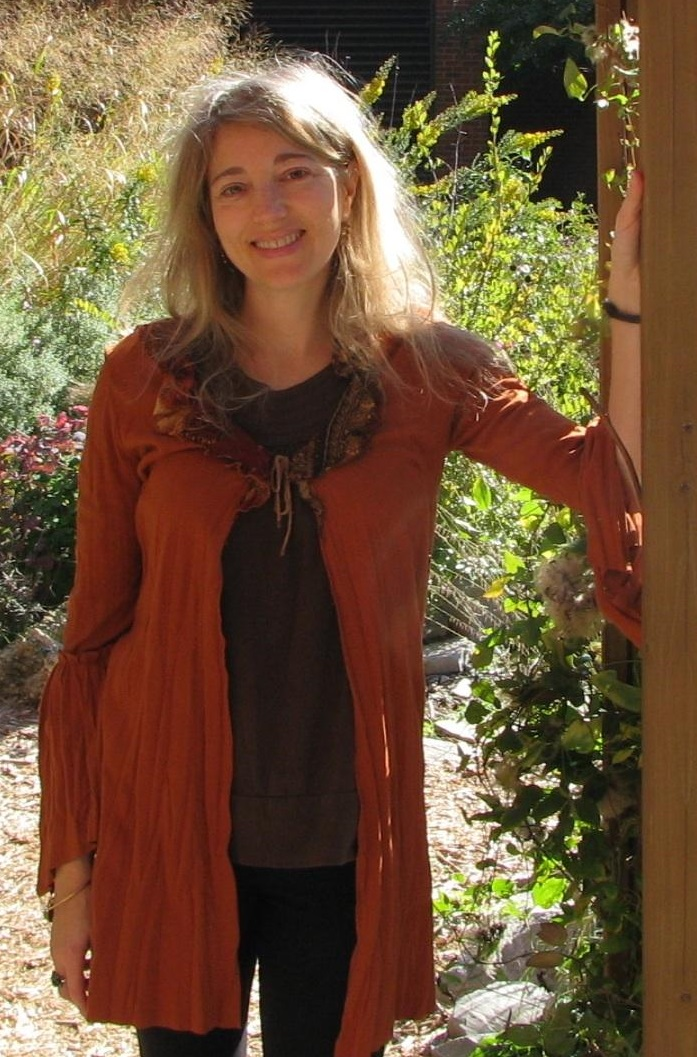
- Born: Wytheville, Virginia, US
- Education: University of Virginia (BA); University of Colorado, Boulder (MA); University of Denver (PhD)
- Occupations: Writer, professor, editor, publisher
- Writing career
- Genres: Poetry, non-fiction

Amy Wright is an American writer and editor.

== Early life and education ==
Wright was born in the Blue Ridge Mountains of southwest Virginia. She received a B.A. in English from the University of Virginia in 1997, an M.A. in English from the University of Colorado, Boulder, and a Ph.D. from the University of Denver. In 2007, she joined the Creative Writing faculty of Austin Peay State University.

== Writing ==
Wright's poetry appears in the Southern Poetry Anthology series, Volume III: Contemporary Appalachia, and Volume VI, Tennessee. Her first chapbook, There Are No New Ways to Kill a Man, was published by Apostrophe Books. Her second chapbook, Farm, was published by Finishing Line Press, and her third, The Garden Will Give You A Fat Lip, won the 2012 Pavement Saw Chapbook Contest. Her fourth chapbook, Rhinestones in the Bed, or Cracker Crumbs, was published in 2014 by Dancing Girl Press. Her fifth chapbook, Wherever the Land Is, was published by MIEL Books in 2016. Her sixth, Think I'll Go Eat a Worm was published by Iris Press in 2019.

Wright’s essays supporting entomophagy appear in Kenyon Review, Gastronomica: The Journal of Food and Culture, and Passages North. Other nonfiction has been published by Brevity, Denver Quarterly, DIAGRAM, Quarter After Eight, and Tupelo Quarterly Review.

== Editing ==
In 2007, Wright joined the editorial staff of Zone 3 journal and Zone 3 Press as Nonfiction Editor.

== Reviews ==
In a review of Rhinestones in the Bed, or Cracker Crumbs for Wilderness House Literary Review, Tom Daley writes: "Flirting with cultural clichés about a particular class of people makes for a risky project, especially in poetry, but Wright probes the pigeonhole, plucks its feathers, and scoops its guano with a brave and unabashed delight."
