= Former Daniel A. Tompkins Company Machine Shop =

Historic building in North Carolina, US

- Daniel A. Tompkins Company Machine Shop, Former
- U.S. National Register of Historic Places
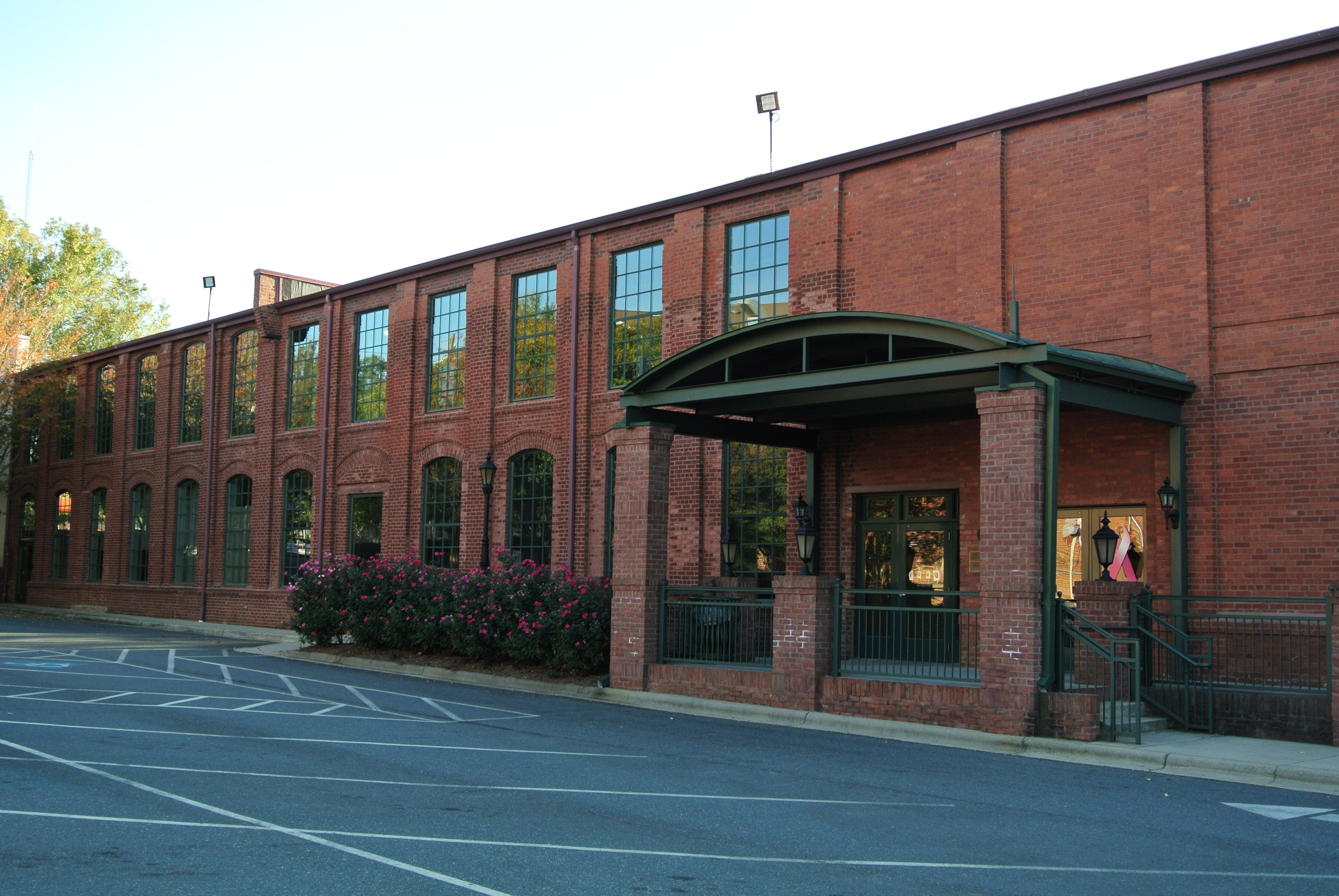
- Former Daniel A. Tompkins Company Machine Shop, October 2016

- Location within North Carolina Location within the United States
- Location: 1900 South Boulevard, Charlotte, North Carolina
- Coordinates: 35°12′39″N 80°51′36″W
- Area: 1.4 acres (0.57 ha)
- Built: 1904-1905, 1911
- NRHP reference No.: 01000422
- Added to NRHP: May 8, 2001

Former Daniel A. Tompkins Company Machine Shop is a historic factory building located at Charlotte, Mecklenburg County, North Carolina. The machine shop was built in 1904–1905, and is a two-story, brick building with a rectangular plan and a small, one story ell. It was expanded in 1911 and an office section was added before 1929. The D.A. Tompkins Company was makers of textile machinery, supplies, and equipment.

It was added to the National Register of Historic Places in 2001.
