= Edgefield Historic District (Nashville, Tennessee) =

Historic district (NRHP) in Nashville, Tennessee

- U.S. National Register of Historic Places
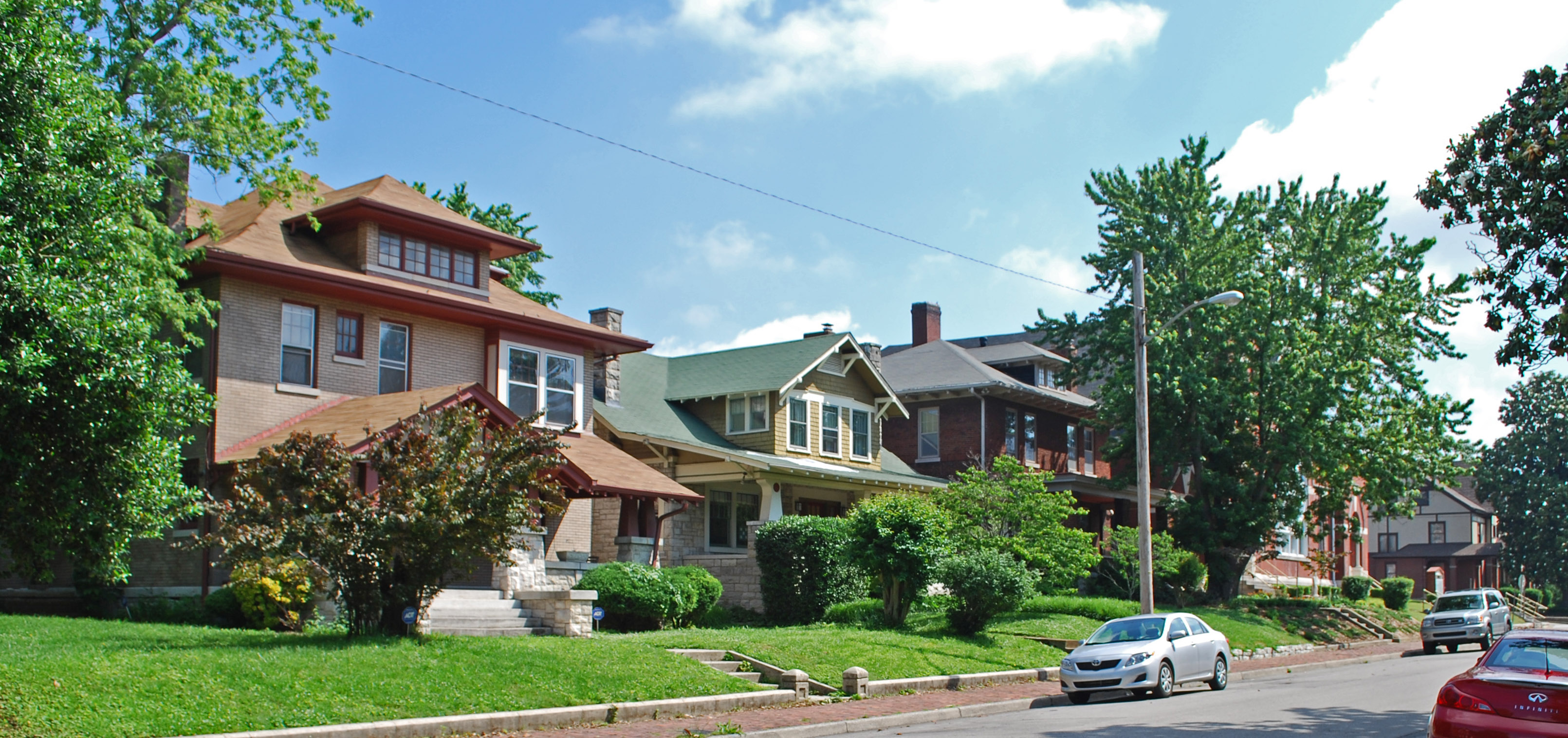
- Homes in Edgefield Historic District

- Location within Tennessee Location within the United States
- Location: Nashville, Tennessee
- Coordinates: 36.172778°N 86.757778°W
- Built: 1850-1874; 1900-1924
- Architect: Multiple
- Architectural style: Italianate architecture; Stick architecture; Eastlake architecture; Queen Anne style architecture
- Website: historicedgefieldneighbors.com
- NRHP reference No.: 77001263
- Added to NRHP: July 13, 1977

Edgefield Historic District is a historic neighborhood in East Nashville, Tennessee. It was listed on the National Register of Historic Places listings in Davidson County, Tennessee (NRHP) on July 13, 1977.

== History ==
The area started in the early 1800s as a rural Nashville neighborhood. Many wealthy people and professionals from Nashville built estates in Edgefield. The outlaw Jesse James lived in Edgefield and his address was 712 Fatherland Street. In 1869 Edgefield became a city, and in 1880, it was annexed by the city of Nashville. The city of Edgefield originally earned its name from Governor Neill S. Brown: he named it for the plains along the river.

=== Civil War ===
During the American Civil War, Edgefield was occupied by Union forces following the surrender of Nashville in February 1862. On February 23, Union cavalry officers met with Nashville mayor R. B. Cheatham at the Edgefield home of banker Charles Fuller, on present-day Woodland Street, to discuss the city's surrender. Nashville came under Union control on February 25.

On November 5, 1862, Confederate cavalry attacked Union positions in Edgefield during operations against Union-occupied Nashville. The 60th Illinois Infantry Regiment participated in repelling the attack, and military records also document a skirmish at Edgefield on November 7.

A contemporary account in the Nashville Dispatch reported that approximately 1,500 Confederate cavalrymen entered Lower Edgefield, exchanging fire with Union troops. The newspaper reported that Confederate forces destroyed the Edgefield railroad depot, a machine shop, and eight railroad cars before withdrawing.

== Architecture ==
Buildings in the district were constructed from 1850 to 1874 and 1900–1924. They feature a variety of architectural styles including Italianate architecture, Stick architecture, Eastlake architecture and Queen Anne style architecture.
