= Stephanie McCurry =

American historian and a professor

External videos
- Book TV: Stephanie McCurry, "Confederate Reckoning", C-SPAN, January 9, 2013

Stephanie McCurry is an American historian and a professor of history at Columbia University. Her book Confederate Reckoning: Power and Politics in the Civil War was a finalist for the Pulitzer Prize for History in 2011.

== Life ==
She was born in Belfast. She graduated from University of Western Ontario, received her MA from the University of Rochester, and Ph.D. from the Binghamton University. She spent nine years on the faculty of the University of California, San Diego before moving to Northwestern University in 1998 and the University of Pennsylvania in 2003. In 2015, she moved again – this time to replace Eric Foner on the faculty at Columbia University.

== Works ==
- Masters of Small Worlds: Yeoman Households, Gender Relations, and the Political Culture of the Antebellum South Carolina Low Country. Oxford University Press. 11 September 1997. ISBN 978-0-19-511795-0.
- Confederate Reckoning: Power and Politics in the Civil War South. Harvard University Press. 7 May 2012. ISBN 978-0-674-05665-7.
- Women's War: Fighting and Surviving the American Civil War. Harvard University Press. 15 April 2019. ISBN 978-0-67-498797-5.
