= Horn Creek Baptist Church =

Historic church in South Carolina, United States

- U.S. National Register of Historic Places
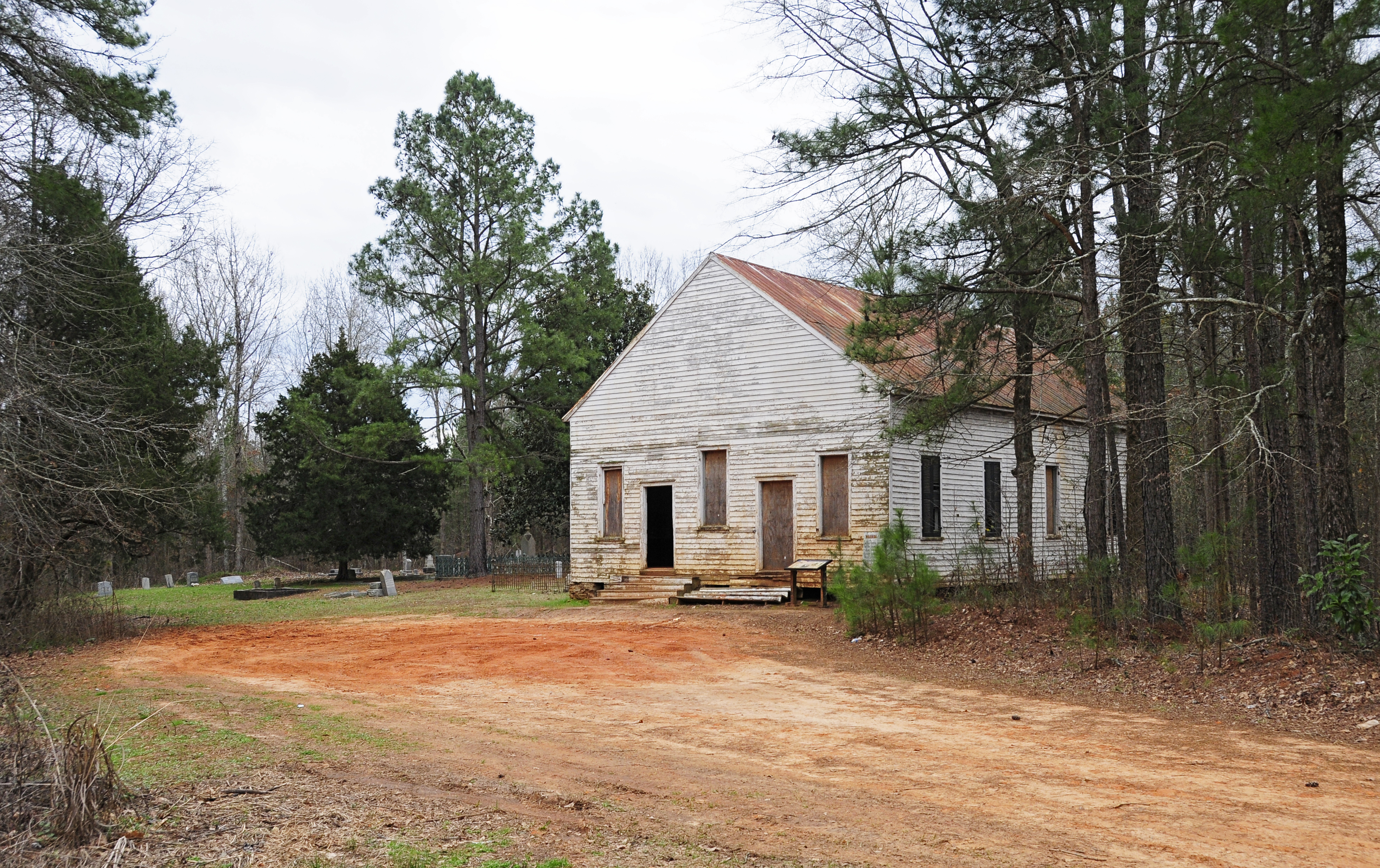

- Location within South Carolina Location within the United States
- Location: South of Edgefield, near Edgefield, South Carolina
- Coordinates: 33°43′15″N 81°56′11″W
- Area: 9.9 acres (4.0 ha)
- Built: 1790
- NRHP reference No.: 71000773
- Added to NRHP: May 06, 1971

Horn Creek Baptist Church is a historic Baptist church in Edgefield, South Carolina. The congregation was founded in 1768 and the current building was constructed in 1790 and remains one of the oldest buildings in the county. The church was added to the National Register of Historic Places in 1971.

== History of Horn's Creek Church and its Restoration ==
Founded in 1768 just a few years after the first settlers arrived in Edgefield County, Horn's Creek Baptist Church was the result of the evangelical mission of the Reverend Daniel Marshall (1707-1784), the renowned Baptist divine who had founded churches in North Carolina, South Carolina and Georgia. In the years following its founding, as the population of the Horn's Creek neighborhood grew and its agricultural economy boomed, this Church became one of the largest and most influential churches in the county, providing a place of worship for both whites and African Americans. Moreover, as one of the “mother” churches of the region, it spawned a number of important “daughter” churches throughout the county.

By the closing decades of the 19th century, the Horn's Creek lands, characterized by dramatic topography with high ridges and deep valleys, had begun to wear out from soil exhaustion and erosion, causing many residents to move out. This gradual depopulation of the neighborhood continued for many decades and was rapidly accelerated by the coming of the boll weevil in the 1920s. In 1942, the few remaining members of Horn's Creek Baptist Church met and decided to discontinue services and to turn the property over to the Edgefield Baptist Association for safe-keeping. For the next sixty years the Horn's Creek Church property was under the control of the Association.

In 1976, the county made the restoration of Horn's Creek Church its Bicentennial Project. In that year, many individuals expended an enormous amount of time and effort working on the church building and cemetery. However, in the decades following, due to its remote and unprotected location, the building and cemetery were subjected to terrible vandalism. Although a number of efforts were made to repair the damage caused by the vandals, the defacement continued unabated. Finally, frustrated by the vandalism, recognizing their inability to restore and preserve the Church, yet cognizant of the historical importance of the property, the Edgefield Baptist Association deeded the property to the Edgefield County Historical Society in 2002.

From the beginning, the Society felt the heavy obligation to preserve and restore this historic treasure. It is one of the oldest – if not the oldest – structures in Edgefield County. The best estimate, based upon architectural and documentary evidence, is that the current building was constructed as least as early as 1784 when the property was platted and conveyed to the original Trustees. It is a monument to the beginning of the religious fervor in the South Carolina and Georgia backcountries in the 18th century. Almost all of the Baptist churches in this region, including Big Stevens Creek Baptist Church in Edgefield County and Kiokee Baptist Church in Columbia County, Georgia, trace their roots to the ministry of Daniel Marshall. The Edgefield County Historical Society was so keenly aware of the importance of this property and the religious revival which started here that it undertook to have a comprehensive history of the early years of the Church written and published several years ago, copies of which can be obtained from the Society.

The Church is also significant because one of Edgefield's most important pottery entrepreneurs, Reverend John Landrum, was the pastor here for nearly forty years. As Reverend Landrum owned the Slave Potter Dave, it is likely that Dave attended Horn's Creek Church from time to time. Horn's Creek Church is therefore one of only two extant structures which can claim a close association with Edgefield's renowned pottery heritage.

The Society's long-term vision for the Church was that it will become a museum for the rich Colonial, Revolutionary and Early National history of Edgefield County, as well as an event center for meetings, concerts, weddings and other gatherings. It was anticipated that the rental revenue derived from events held here would provide the income to maintain the property.

The Society's original efforts at restoration of the Church were frustrated by the destructive vandalism which continued while the property was still uninhabited. It was finally concluded that no further efforts at restoration were warranted until the property could be protected by having someone living on site. The Society made some efforts at temporarily housing a caretaker on site in the years immediately following its acquisition of the property, but it became clear that this would not be enough.

Thus, it was not until 2013 that a decision was made to move forward with the construction a caretaker's cottage. With the support of much volunteer help, generous contributions, and a mortgage loan from a regional bank, construction of a caretaker's cottage was begun in the spring of 2014. A ground-breaking ceremony was held on Palm Sunday, April 13, 2014. By the spring of 2015 the cottage was completed, and is, by all accounts, a very credible structure, much in keeping with the architecture of the Church.

About this same time, the Society secured Barney Lamar, a Beech Island native with deep Edgefield County roots, to be the caretaker of the property. Mr. Lamar is a restorer of fine art. His collection of art is displayed in the cottage and provides another element for visitors to see. With the caretaker living on site, there has been no vandalism to the Church or the Cemetery.

By the end of 2016, although the caretaker's cottage was completed and the property was protected, nothing substantial had been done restore the Church building itself. Then, in early 2017, a one-time grant program of the South Carolina National Heritage Corridor was announced for which the restoration of Horn's Creek Church was eligible. In July of that year, a $50,000 grant was awarded for the project and the requisite $50,000 in matching funds was secured from a group of committed individuals. The restoration work on the Church began in earnest in the Fall of 2017 and was substantially completed in 2018, including the installation of interpretive panels on the interior walls, telling the story of the region and the church.

The Horn's Creek Church Museum is now open by appointment. For those more interested in the detailed history of the Church, copies of The Early History of Horn's Creek Church by Bettis C. Rainsford are available by contacting the Edgefield County Historical Society, P. O. Box 174, Edgefield, SC 29824, 803-637-2233. For those wanting to visit the Church, please call 803-844-8186 or 803-637-2233.
