= Pottersville (Edgefield, South Carolina) =

Archaeological site in South Carolina, United States

- U.S. National Register of Historic Places
- Nearest city: Edgefield, South Carolina
- Area: 5 acres (2.0 ha)
- NRHP reference No.: 75001698
- Added to NRHP: January 17, 1975

Pottersville is a historic archaeological site located near Edgefield, Edgefield County, South Carolina. It was the site of the Pottersville kiln, which operated until the American Civil War, when it was abandoned. The kiln was involved in the production and distribution of alkaline-glazed wares. The Pottersville kiln site is now a large mound in a grassy field atop a hill. An adjoining depression may have been the kiln itself, with the waste dumps now forming the mound.

It was listed on the National Register of Historic Places in 1975.
