= Marshfield (Trenton, South Carolina) =

Historic house in South Carolina, United States

- U.S. National Register of Historic Places
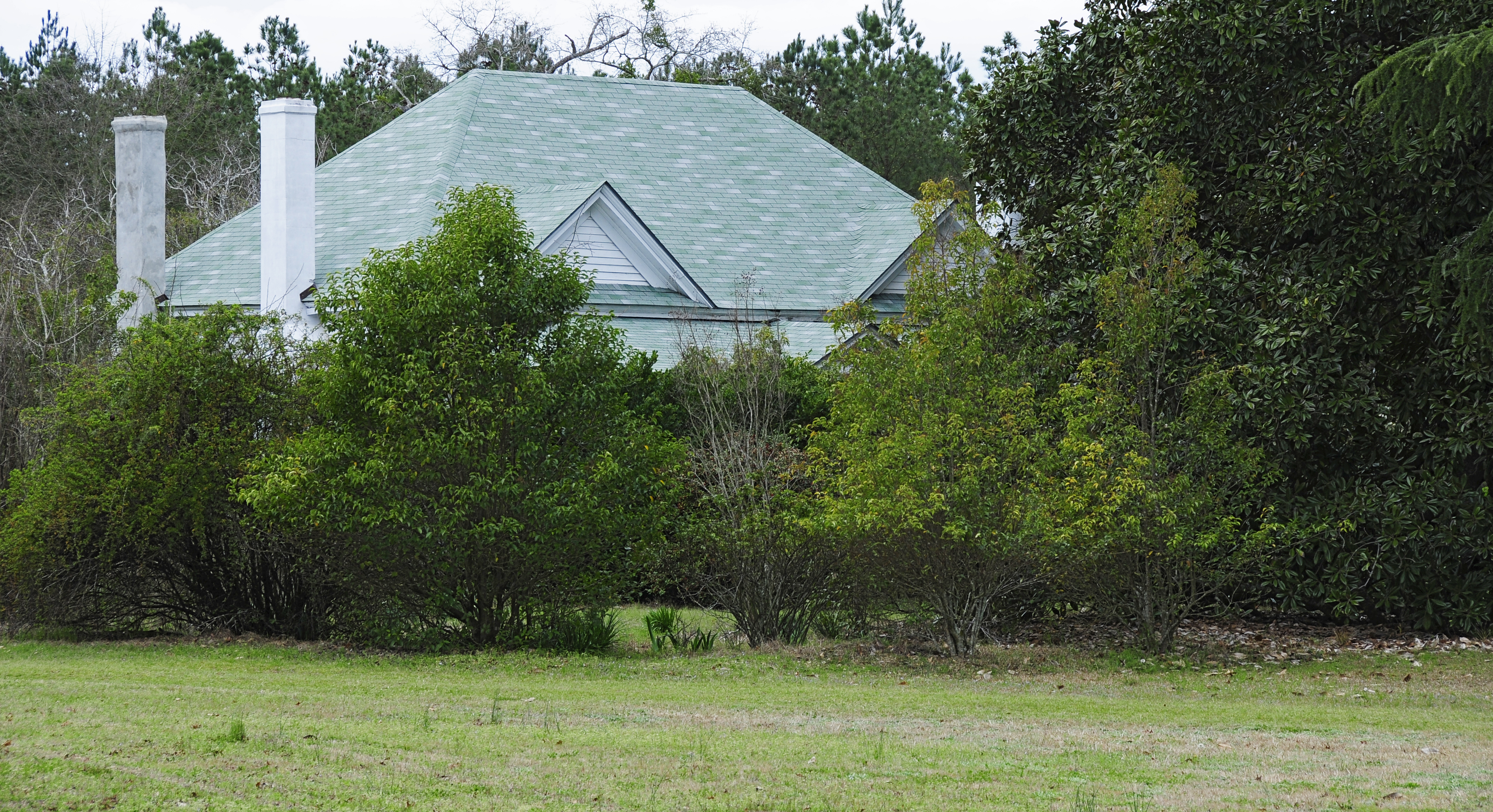
- Marshfield, March 2012

- Location within South Carolina Location within the United States
- Location: Youngblood Rd. northwest of Trenton, near Trenton, South Carolina
- Coordinates: 33°45′25″N 81°52′6″W
- Area: 4 acres (1.6 ha)
- Built: c. 1831, 1909
- Architectural style: Mid 19th Century Revival
- NRHP reference No.: 94001561
- Added to NRHP: January 9, 1995

Marshfield, also known as Old Marsh Home Place, is a historic plantation house located near Trenton, Edgefield County, South Carolina. The original house, built about 1831, rests on a foundation of brick and granite rocks. The house is an L-shaped, one-story frame residence with additions and alterations made in the late-19th and early-20th centuries. Also located on the property are the contributing early-19th century shed or "smokehouse"; an early 19th-century house, constructed of hand-hewn and pegged timbers and containing a stone fireplace; the Marsh family cemetery; and the archaeological remains of additional outbuildings.

It was listed on the National Register of Historic Places in 1995.
