= Darby Plantation (Edgefield, South Carolina) =

Historic house in South Carolina, United States

- U.S. National Register of Historic Places
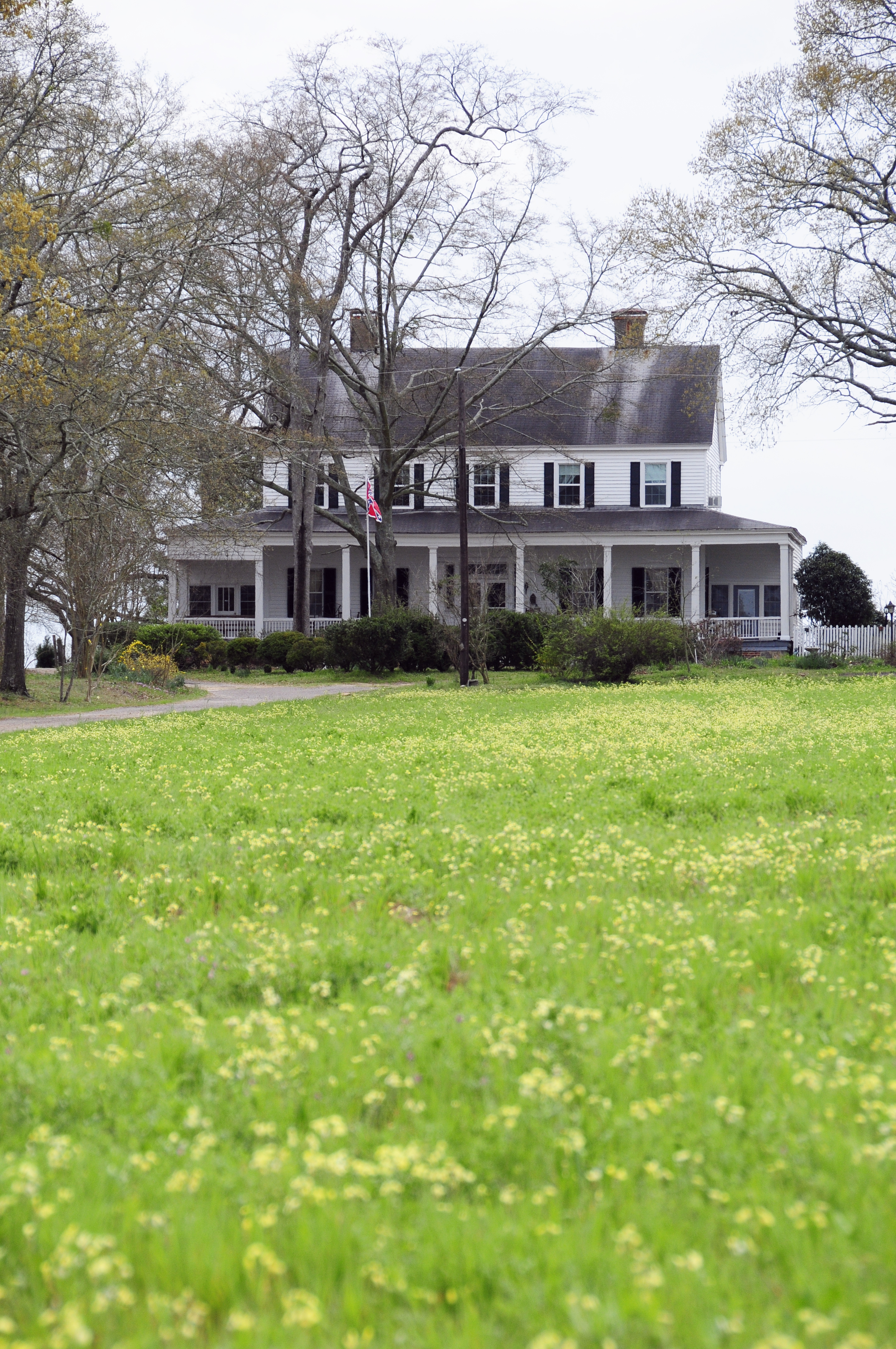

- Location within South Carolina Location within the United States
- Location: 1150 Augusta Road, Trenton, SC
- Coordinates: 33°44′55″N 81°52′55″W
- Built: c. 1842
- Architectural style: Greek Revival
- NRHP reference No.: 74001851
- Added to NRHP: Aug. 13, 1974

Darby Plantation plantation house was built by Nathaniel Lipscomb Griffith, the father of Anne Patience Griffith, at the time of her marriage to Edgefield lawyer Milledge Luke Bonham. It has a deep wraparound porch supported by twelve columns. The main rooms are twenty feet by twenty feet with twelve foot ceilings, and the house is built of pine. When Bonham returned from the United States' war with Mexico, he was elected to the U.S. House of Representatives. At the outbreak of the Civil War, Bonham was put in charge of South Carolina's volunteer army and served with distinction. In 1862, he resigned his commission and became governor of South Carolina. In 1863, the house was sold to Confederate Secretary of the Treasury George Trenholm. During the Civil War, the house was used as a storage place for some of the items from the Charleston Museum. Since 1878, the plantation has been owned by the Wise family.

The house was listed in the National Register August 13, 1974.
