= Edgefield County, South Carolina =

County in South Carolina, United States

- County
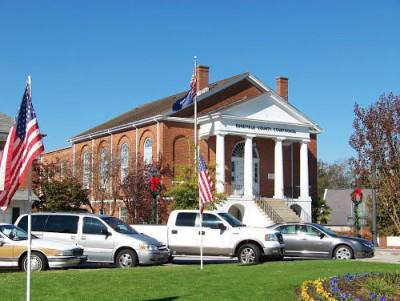
- Edgefield County Courthouse

- Seal
- Nickname: Home of Ten Governors
- Motto: "It Feels Different Here Because It Is Different Here"
- Location within the U.S. state of South Carolina
- Interactive map of Edgefield County, South Carolina
- Coordinates: 33.78°N 81.97°W
- Country: United States
- State: South Carolina
- Founded: 1785; 241 years ago
- Named for: County's location at the Edge of the State
- Seat: Edgefield
- Largest community: Edgefield

Area
  - Total: 507.00 sq mi (1,313.1 km^{2})
  - Land: 500.71 sq mi (1,296.8 km^{2})
  - Water: 6.29 sq mi (16.3 km^{2}) 1.24%

Population (2020)
  - Total: 25,657
  - Estimate (2025): 29,808 ▲
  - Density: 51.241/sq mi (19.784/km^{2})
- Time zone: UTC−5 (Eastern)
  - Summer (DST): UTC−4 (EDT)
- Congressional district: 3rd
- Website: edgefieldcounty.sc.gov

Edgefield County is a county located on the western border of the U.S. state of South Carolina. As of the 2020 census, its population was 25,657. Its county seat and largest community is Edgefield. The county was established on March 12, 1785. The Savannah River makes up part of the western border of Edgefield County; across the river lies the city of Augusta, Georgia. Edgefield is part of the Augusta-Richmond County, GA-SC Metropolitan Statistical Area.

== History ==
The origin of the name Edgefield is unclear; the South Carolina State Library's information on the county's history suggests that the name "is usually described as 'fanciful.'" There is a village named Edgefield in Norfolk, England.

Edgefield District was created in 1785, and it is bordered on the west by the Savannah River. It was formed from the southern section of the former Ninety-Six District when it was divided into smaller districts or counties by an act of the state legislature. Parts of the district were later used in the formation of other neighboring counties, specifically:

- Aiken in 1871
- Saluda in 1895
- Greenwood in 1897
- McCormick in 1916

In his study of Edgefield County, South Carolina, Orville Vernon Burton classified white society as comprising the poor, the yeoman middle class, and the elite planters. A clear line demarcated the elite, but according to Burton, the line between poor and yeoman was never very distinct. Stephanie McCurry argues that yeomen were clearly distinguished from poor whites by their ownership of land (real property). Edgefield's yeomen farmers were "self-working farmers," distinct from the elite because they worked their land themselves alongside any slaves they owned. By owning large numbers of slaves, planters took on a managerial function and did not work in the fields.

During Reconstruction, Edgefield County had a slight black majority. It became a center of political tensions following the postwar amendments that gave freedmen civil rights under the US constitution. Whites conducted an insurgency to maintain white supremacy, particularly through paramilitary groups known as the Red Shirts. They used violence and intimidation during election seasons from 1872 on to disrupt and suppress black Republican voting.

In May 1876, six black suspects were lynched by a white mob for the alleged murders of a white couple. In the Hamburg Massacre of July 8, 1876, several black militia were killed by whites, part of a large group of more than 100 armed men who attended a court hearing of a complaint of whites against the militia. Some of the white men came from Augusta. Due to fraud, more Democratic votes were recorded in Edgefield County than there were total residents; similar fraud occurred elsewhere, as did suppression of black voting. Eventually the election was decided in Hampton's favor, and the Democrats also took control of the state legislature. As a result of a national compromise, Federal troops were withdrawn in 1877 from South Carolina and other southern states, ending Reconstruction.

The long decline in population from 1910 to 1980 reflects the decline in agriculture, mechanization reducing labor needs, and the effect of many African Americans leaving for Northern and Midwestern cities in the Great Migration out of the rural South.

== Geography ==
According to the U.S. Census Bureau, the county has a total area of 507.00 square miles (1,313.1 km^{2}), of which 500.71 square miles (1,296.8 km^{2}) is land and 6.29 square miles (16.3 km^{2}) (1.24%) is water.

=== National protected area ===
- Sumter National Forest (part)

=== State and local protected area ===
- Stevens Creek Heritage Preserve/Wildlife Management Area (part)

=== Major water bodies ===
- Savannah River
- Steven Creek

=== Adjacent counties ===
- Saluda County – northeast
- Aiken County – east
- Richmond County, Georgia – southwest
- Columbia County, Georgia – southwest
- McCormick County – west
- Greenwood County – northwest

=== Major highways ===
- US 25
- US 25 Truck
- US 378
- SC 19
- SC 19 Conn.
- SC 23
- SC 23 Truck
- SC 121
- SC 191
- SC 230
- SC 430
- SC 430 Conn.

=== Major infrastructure ===
- Edgefield County Airport

== Demographics ==
Historical population
Census	Pop.	Note	%±
1790	13,289		—
1800	18,130		36.4%
1810	23,160		27.7%
1820	25,119		8.5%
1830	30,509		21.5%
1840	32,852		7.7%
1850	39,262		19.5%
1860	39,887		1.6%
1870	42,486		6.5%
1880	45,844		7.9%
1890	49,259		7.4%
1900	25,478		−48.3%
1910	28,281		11.0%
1920	23,928		−15.4%
1930	19,326		−19.2%
1940	17,894		−7.4%
1950	16,591		−7.3%
1960	15,735		−5.2%
1970	15,692		−0.3%
1980	17,528		11.7%
1990	18,375		4.8%
2000	24,595		33.9%
2010	26,985		9.7%
2020	25,657		−4.9%
2025 (est.)	29,808	▲	16.2%
U.S. Decennial Census; 1790–1960 1900–1990; 1990–2000 2010 2020

=== Racial and ethnic composition ===
Edgefield County, South Carolina – Racial and ethnic composition Note: the US Census treats Hispanic/Latino as an ethnic category. This table excludes Latinos from the racial categories and assigns them to a separate category. Hispanics/Latinos may be of any race.
Race / Ethnicity (NH = Non-Hispanic)	Pop 1980	Pop 1990	Pop 2000	Pop 2010	Pop 2020	% 1980	% 1990	% 2000	% 2010	% 2020
White alone (NH)	8,711	9,756	13,645	15,196	14,890	49.70%	53.09%	55.48%	56.31%	58.03%
Black or African American alone (NH)	8,567	8,496	10,165	9,951	8,301	48.88%	46.24%	41.33%	36.88%	32.35%
Native American or Alaska Native alone (NH)	15	11	74	62	67	0.09%	0.06%	0.30%	0.23%	0.26%
Asian alone (NH)	15	29	58	94	118	0.09%	0.16%	0.24%	0.35%	0.46%
Native Hawaiian or Pacific Islander alone (NH)	x	x	1	11	6	x	x	0.00%	0.04%	0.02%
Other race alone (NH)	9	4	7	20	93	0.05%	0.02%	0.03%	0.07%	0.36%
Mixed race or Multiracial (NH)	x	x	142	237	811	x	x	0.58%	0.88%	3.16%
Hispanic or Latino (any race)	211	79	503	1,414	1,371	1.20%	0.43%	2.05%	5.24%	5.34%
Total	17,528	18,375	24,595	26,985	25,657	100.00%	100.00%	100.00%	100.00%	100.00%

=== 2020 census ===
As of the 2020 census, the county had a population of 25,657 and a median age of 44.4 years; 19.0% of residents were under the age of 18 and 19.9% were 65 years of age or older. For every 100 females there were 110.7 males, and for every 100 females age 18 and over there were 112.4 males.

The census recorded 9,634 households, of which 6,471 were families residing in the county.

The racial makeup of the county was 59.8% White, 32.6% Black or African American, 0.3% American Indian and Alaska Native, 0.5% Asian, 0.0% Native Hawaiian and Pacific Islander, 2.8% from some other race, and 4.0% from two or more races. Hispanic or Latino residents of any race comprised 5.3% of the population.

12.0% of residents lived in urban areas, while 88.0% lived in rural areas.

There were 9,634 households in the county, of which 28.0% had children under the age of 18 living with them and 28.9% had a female householder with no spouse or partner present. About 27.8% of all households were made up of individuals and 13.9% had someone living alone who was 65 years of age or older.

There were 11,022 housing units, of which 12.6% were vacant. Among occupied housing units, 77.9% were owner-occupied and 22.1% were renter-occupied. The homeowner vacancy rate was 1.3% and the rental vacancy rate was 6.9%.

=== 2010 census ===
At the 2010 census, there were 55,285 people, 21,348 households, and 16,706 families living in the county. The population density was 53.9 inhabitants per square mile (20.8/km^{2}). There were 10,559 housing units at an average density of 21.1 per square mile (8.1/km^{2}). The racial makeup of the county was 58.6% white, 37.2% black or African American, 0.4% Asian, 0.2% American Indian or Alaska Native, 2.2% from other races, and 1.3% from two or more races. Those of Hispanic or Latino origin (of any race) made up 5.2% of the population. In terms of ancestry, 15.8% were American, 9.0% were English, 6.7% were Irish, and 5.1% were German.

Of the 9,348 households, 33.3% had children under the age of 18 living with them, 50.9% were married couples living together, 16.0% had a female householder with no husband present, 28.3% were non-families, and 24.9% of all households were made up of individuals. The average household size was 2.56 and the average family size was 3.04. The median age was 40.3 years.

The median income for a household in the county was $42,834 and the median income for a family was $57,114. Males had a median income of $41,759 versus $29,660 for females. The per capita income for the county was $19,901. About 17.8% of families and 21.2% of the population were below the poverty line, including 33.1% of those under age 18 and 17.1% of those age 65 or over.

=== 2000 census ===
At the 2000 census, there were 24,595 people, 8,270 households, and 6,210 families living in the county. The population density was 49 inhabitants per square mile (19/km^{2}). There were 9,223 housing units at an average density of 18 per square mile (6.9/km^{2}). The racial makeup of the county was 56.77% White, 41.51% Black or African American, 0.33% Native American, 0.24% Asian, 0.03% Pacific Islander, 0.44% from other races, and 0.69% from two or more races. 2.05% of the population were Hispanic or Latino of any race.

There were 8,270 households, out of which 34.80% had children under the age of 18 living with them, 55.60% were married couples living together, 15.50% had a female householder with no husband present, and 24.90% were non-families. 22.40% of all households were made up of individuals, and 9.10% had someone living alone who was 65 years of age or older. The average household size was 2.66 and the average family size was 3.12.

In the county, the population was spread out, with 24.10% under the age of 18, 9.80% from 18 to 24, 32.10% from 25 to 44, 23.20% from 45 to 64, and 10.90% who were 65 years of age or older. The median age was 36 years. For every 100 females, there were 112.80 males. For every 100 females age 18 and over, there were 114.80 males.

The median income for a household in the county was $35,146, and the median income for a family was $41,810. Males had a median income of $32,748 versus $23,331 for females. The per capita income for the county was $15,415. About 13.00% of families and 15.50% of the population were below the poverty line, including 19.60% of those under age 18 and 18.40% of those age 65 or over.

== Government and politics ==
The Federal Bureau of Prisons Federal Correctional Institution, Edgefield is in the county; it is partially within the city limits of Edgefield, and partially in an unincorporated area.

United States presidential election results for Edgefield County, South Carolina
Year	Republican		Democratic		Third party(ies)	
Year	No.	%	No.	%	No.	%
1900	17	1.82%	919	98.18%	0	0.00%
1904	5	0.51%	967	99.49%	0	0.00%
1912	3	0.38%	779	97.38%	18	2.25%
1916	5	0.52%	959	99.48%	0	0.00%
1920	0	0.00%	976	100.00%	0	0.00%
1924	0	0.00%	915	100.00%	0	0.00%
1928	4	0.33%	1,201	99.67%	0	0.00%
1932	10	0.75%	1,316	99.25%	0	0.00%
1936	1	0.08%	1,304	99.92%	0	0.00%
1940	9	0.84%	1,065	99.16%	0	0.00%
1944	3	0.42%	654	92.24%	52	7.33%
1948	6	0.33%	27	1.48%	1,797	98.20%
1952	1,665	68.86%	753	31.14%	0	0.00%
1956	516	25.27%	525	25.71%	1,001	49.02%
1960	1,448	63.12%	846	36.88%	0	0.00%
1964	2,489	75.13%	824	24.87%	0	0.00%
1968	1,688	43.07%	1,225	31.26%	1,006	25.67%
1972	2,812	66.67%	1,326	31.44%	80	1.90%
1976	1,879	36.58%	3,216	62.60%	42	0.82%
1980	2,415	40.68%	3,465	58.36%	57	0.96%
1984	3,224	49.77%	3,227	49.81%	27	0.42%
1988	3,814	55.57%	3,020	44.00%	29	0.42%
1992	3,339	45.15%	3,433	46.42%	624	8.44%
1996	3,640	48.62%	3,576	47.77%	270	3.61%
2000	4,760	53.88%	3,950	44.71%	124	1.40%
2004	5,611	57.57%	4,051	41.57%	84	0.86%
2008	6,334	54.98%	5,075	44.05%	111	0.96%
2012	6,512	56.21%	4,967	42.87%	107	0.92%
2016	6,842	58.76%	4,491	38.57%	311	2.67%
2020	8,184	61.52%	4,953	37.23%	167	1.26%
2024	9,092	65.32%	4,659	33.47%	168	1.21%

== Economy ==
In 2022, the GDP of Edgefield County was $807.3 million (approx. $29,243 per capita). In chained 2017 dollars, the real GDP was $645.6 million (about $23,386 per capita). Between 2022-2023, the unemployment rate has been 3.1-3.2% on average.

Some of the largest employers in the county include Dollar General and the United States Department of Justice.

Employment and Wage Statistics by Industry in Edgefield County, South Carolina
Industry	Employment Counts	Employment Percentage (%)	Average Annual Wage ($)
Accommodation and Food Services	343	6.5	14,196
Administrative and Support and Waste Management and Remediation Services	222	4.2	46,800
Agriculture, Forestry, Fishing and Hunting	530	10.0	42,484
Arts, Entertainment, and Recreation	52	1.0	24,492
Construction	286	5.4	54,496
Finance and Insurance	46	0.9	46,176
Health Care and Social Assistance	606	11.4	40,456
Information	13	0.2	75,868
Management of Companies and Enterprises	8	0.2	104,988
Manufacturing	1,419	26.8	56,940
Other Services (except Public Administration)	237	4.5	52,676
Professional, Scientific, and Technical Services	85	1.6	61,932
Public Administration	794	15.0	65,468
Real Estate and Rental and Leasing	13	0.2	39,468
Retail Trade	362	6.8	43,680
Transportation and Warehousing	118	2.2	70,772
Utilities	79	1.5	72,852
Wholesale Trade	87	1.6	86,060
Total	5,300	100.0%	51,236

== Media ==
Edgefield has one newspaper, published in the town of the same name:

- Edgefield Advertiser, the oldest newspaper in S.C.

The local radio station is located in the town of Johnston:

- WLFW

Edgefield is also served by the following television stations:

- WRDW-TV News 12, Augusta, Georgia
- WJBF NewsChannel 6, Augusta, Georgia
- WAGT NBC Augusta 26, Augusta, Georgia
- WFXG FOX-54, Augusta, Georgia

== Communities ==
=== City ===
- North Augusta (mostly in Aiken County)

=== Towns ===
- Edgefield (county seat and largest community)
- Johnston
- Trenton

=== Census-designated place ===
- Murphys Estates

== Education ==
The school district for the entire county is Edgefield County School District.

== Notable people ==
=== Governors ===
- Andrew Pickens, II 1816–1818
- George McDuffie 1834–1836
- Pierce Mason Butler 1836–1838
- James H. Hammond 1842–1844
- Francis W. Pickens 1860–1862
- Milledge L. Bonham 1862–1864
- John C. Sheppard 1886
- Benjamin R. Tillman 1890–1894
- John Gary Evans 1894–1897
- Strom Thurmond 1947–1951

=== Other notable people ===
In addition to its ten governors of South Carolina listed below, Edgefield County was the home of numerous local notables:

- George Galphin (1709–1780)
- Samuel Hammond (1757–1842)
- Parson Mason Locke Weems (1759–1825)
- Rev. William Bullein Johnson (1782–1862)
- Augustus Baldwin Longstreet (1790–1870), a famous author
- Andrew Pickens Butler (1796–1857)
- Dave Drake (1800–1879?), a slave
- Louis T. Wigfall (1816–1874)
- Preston S. Brooks (1819–1857)
- General James Longstreet (1821–1904), a leading Confederate general
- Prince Rivers (1823–1887), a black leader
- George D. Tillman (1826–1901)
- Martin Witherspoon Gary (1831–1881)
- Lucy Holcombe Pickens (1832–1899)
- Matthew Calbraith Butler (1836–1909)
- Lawrence Cain (1845–1884), a black leader
- Paris Simkins (1849–1930), a black leader
- Daniel Augustus Tompkins (1851–1914)
- Benjamin Mays (1894–1984), a black leader
- Francis Butler Simkins (1897–1966), a historian
- Davis Timmerman, a murder victim whose case resulted in the first execution of a woman in South Carolina's electric chair.

== See also ==
- List of counties in South Carolina
- National Register of Historic Places listings in Edgefield County, South Carolina
