= Edgefield, South Carolina =

- Town
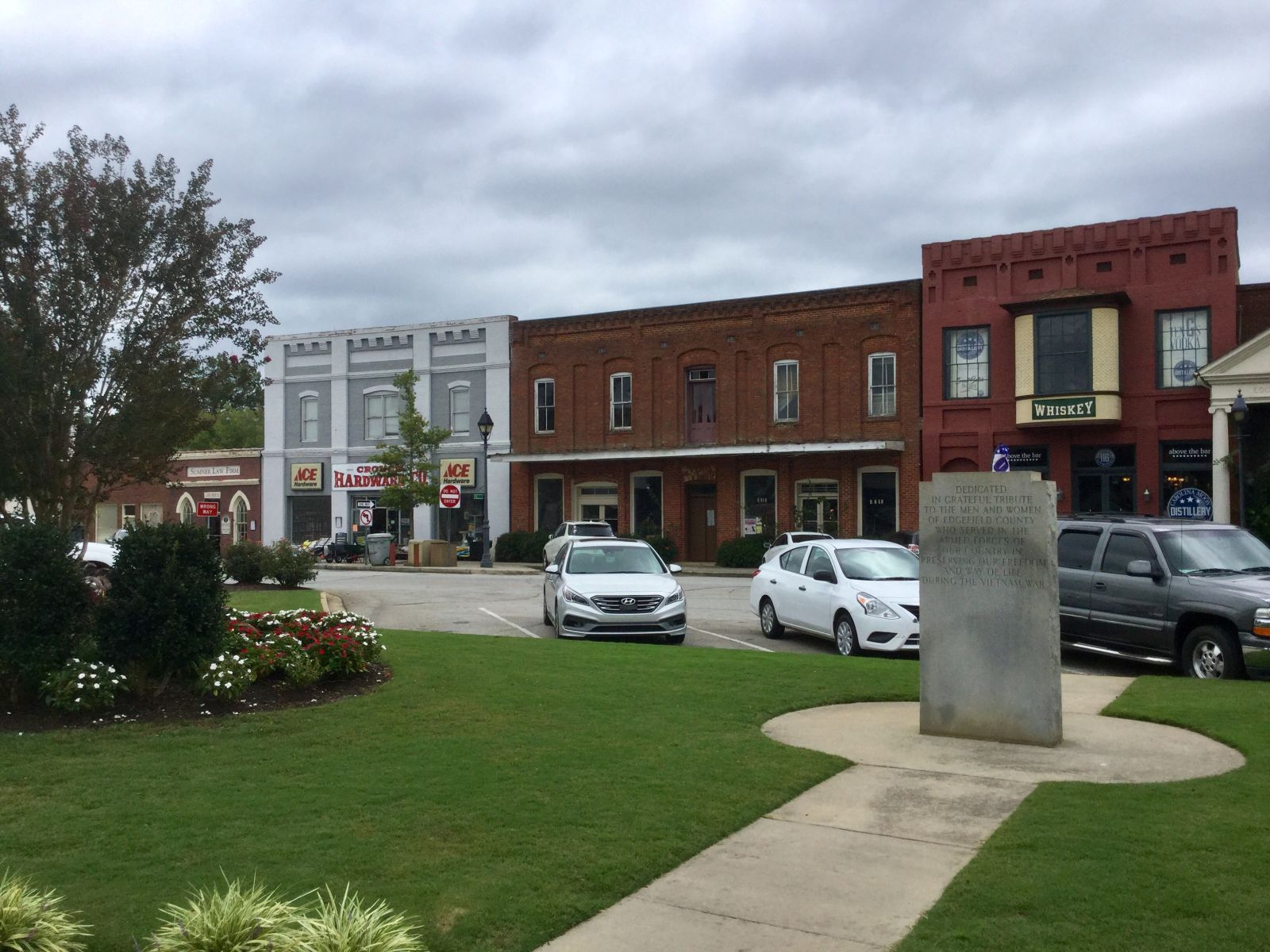
- Town square in Edgefield

- Flag Seal
- Nickname: Home of Ten Governors
- Location of Edgefield, South Carolina

- Location within South Carolina Location within the United States
- Coordinates: 33°47′N 81°56′W
- Country: United States
- State: South Carolina
- County: Edgefield

Area
  - Total: 4.32 sq mi (11.19 km^{2})
  - Land: 4.20 sq mi (10.89 km^{2})
  - Water: 0.12 sq mi (0.30 km^{2})
- Elevation: 531 ft (162 m)

Population (2020)
  - Total: 2,322
  - Density: 552.4/sq mi (213.29/km^{2})
- Time zone: UTC−5 (Eastern (EST))
  - Summer (DST): UTC−4 (EDT)
- ZIP code: 29824
- Area codes: 803 and 839
- FIPS code: 45-22795
- GNIS feature ID: 1247634
- Website: www.exploreedgefield.com

Edgefield is a town in and the county seat of Edgefield County, South Carolina, United States. As of the 2020 census, Edgefield had a population of 2,322.

Edgefield is part of the Augusta Metropolitan Area.

== Geography ==
Edgefield is located slightly east of the center of Edgefield County at 33°47′N 81°56′W (33.7868, -81.9278). U.S. Route 25 passes through the southwest part of the town, bypassing the center, and leads north 33 miles (53 km) to Greenwood and south 26 miles (42 km) to Augusta, Georgia. South Carolina Highway 23 passes through the center of the town, leading east 26 miles (42 km) to Batesburg-Leesville and west 17 miles (27 km) to Modoc on U.S. Route 221 near the Savannah River.

According to the United States Census Bureau, Edgefield has a total area of 4.3 square miles (11.1 km^{2}), of which 4.2 square miles (10.8 km^{2}) is land and 0.1 square miles (0.3 km^{2}), or 2.71%, is water.

== History ==
The story of Edgefield is more than a quarter of a millennium long, reaching back to before the first European settlers arrived, when only Native Americans roamed the forests. At that time the area which later became Edgefield County was a vast wilderness of virgin forests, occasional prairies, great cane brakes, and sparkling rivers and creeks. It was bisected by the fall line, with sandy soils on the southeast side of this line growing primarily pine trees, and rich clay soils on the northwest side growing primarily oak and hickory. Wildlife was abundant with deer and turkey, but also with elk, buffalo (bison), panther, and bear.

=== 18th century ===
The initial settlement of present-day Edgefield County occurred in the quarter century between 1750 and 1775. Some settlers came up from the South Carolina Lowcountry but more poured down "the Great Wagon Road" from the colonies to the north. In this colonial period the economy was primarily a subsistence one, in which the settlers consumed what they raised. Initially there were no courts or law enforcement, but beginning in the mid-1760s, the law-abiding settlers began their struggle to bring law, order, and government to the "backcountry" of South Carolina.

The colonial period was followed by the prolonged conflict with Great Britain which began in 1775. By this time there were many settlers living in present-day Edgefield County and almost all of them were involved, on one side or the other, in the Revolutionary War. Some Edgefieldians were die-hard patriots from the outset, who believed that the American colonies should be free and independent. Others were loyal to the king who had granted them land and provided a home for them in the New World. Still others wanted no part of the conflict but were inevitably drawn into it by partisans on each side. Finally, others were strictly opportunists who switched sides back and forth as they perceived their best interest. The conflict was, in this area, a bitter civil war in which personal vendettas often superseded politics as the cause for fighting. Cousins fought against cousins and neighbors against neighbors. When General Lighthorse Harry Lee later wrote about the Revolution in this area, he stated that "in no part of the South was the war fought with such asperity as in this quarter. It often sank into barbarity."

Following the Revolution, citizens turned their attention to establishing local government and to rebuilding the economy. In 1788 the 96 District was divided into smaller counties. The boundaries of Edgefield County were established at that time and the courthouse site was designated. Although a substantial but unsuccessful effort was made in the late 1780s to bring tobacco to Edgefield County as a money crop, short staple cotton began to assume that role in the late 1790s. For the next two decades the cultivation of cotton spread across the county. The rich clay soils of the piedmont proved ideal for growing cotton. African slaves were brought in to provide the labor for cotton cultivation, resulting in a mushrooming of the slave population of Edgefield County. During the first two decades of the 19th century, Edgefield County, like most of piedmont South Carolina, began to experience unprecedented prosperity.

=== 19th century (antebellum period) ===
With the construction of the jail and courthouse at the designated county seat beginning in 1785, a village began to grow up around the public buildings: first houses for the public officials, then a tavern, then a store, gradually other houses, and then other stores. By 1811 a school was established, then several churches and more houses. By 1826 South Carolina architect Robert Mills could describe Edgefield Courthouse village as "a neat little village ... [with] between forty and fifty [houses]. The buildings are neat, commodious, and generally painted . ... The population is estimated at 300."

In the antebellum era, Edgefield was not the market town of the District. In the Plantation economy, the plantation owners took their cotton to market in Augusta or Hamburg and bought the majority of their supplies from merchants in those market towns. The merchants of Edgefield Courthouse village primarily filled in the needs of the planters between trips to the larger market towns.

During the first several decades of the 19th century, Edgefield, being the courthouse village of a large and prosperous district, began to develop its reputation as a center of law and politics. A number of the sons of the wealthy cotton planters and other ambitious young men, after attending elite schools and colleges across the nation, came to Edgefield to practice law and engage in politics. Many of these young lawyers and politicians also maintained large plantations out in the District. These budding leaders built substantial houses in town and created a social atmosphere which attracted more similarly-situated young men.

The social prestige of being a planter with broad acres and many slaves, and dabbling in law and politics, caused many ambitious young Edgefieldians in the antebellum period to develop a self-confidence, an overdeveloped sense of honor, and an aristocratic worldview which did not always serve them well. One result of this was a widespread devotion to the Code Duello, which resulted in a number of Edgefield's best and brightest becoming involved in tragic duels. Another result was a sense of invincibility, which caused many to approach war with a cavalier attitude and to focus on the glories of victory rather than on the horrors of death and defeat. These young men also accepted violence, which had been a common occurrence in Edgefield from its earliest days, as an inevitable part of life, and in some cases even glorified it. Edgefield had a "violent reputation". "Since before Edgefield was officially a town, it has been known for violence and scandal."

While planting, politics, and violence captured the imagination of most white Edgefieldians, a number of other bright young men looked for opportunities in industry and commerce. Dr. Abner Landrum developed a pottery industry which was to have a major impact on Edgefield for more than half a century. Henry Schultz, a German immigrant, developed Hamburg, a new town on the Savannah River, which became an important commercial center during the antebellum era. Another German immigrant, Christian Breithaupt, built the first textile mill in this part of the state at Vaucluse. A number of Edgefieldians participated in bringing the South Carolina Railroad to Hamburg. The Plank Road from Edgefield to Hamburg was built. William Gregg, a Charleston silversmith, came to run the Vaucluse factory and wound up developing the Graniteville factory, the most successful textile operation in the antebellum South. These industrial and commercial enterprises were a significant part of the fabric of antebellum Edgefield and a number of the Edgefield lawyers and planters were involved in these endeavors.

However, the most significant contribution of antebellum Edgefield to our nation's history was the intense sectionalism which began in the mid-1820s and evolved to 1860. Edgefield Congressman George McDuffie (later Senator and Governor) initiated the fight against federal tariffs which were imposed on imported goods to protect New England manufacturers. He believed that the interests of this section of the country were being sacrificed for the good of New England.

McDuffie, together with South Carolina statesman John C. Calhoun, developed the doctrine of "nullification", which postulated that a state had the right to nullify a federal law with which it disagreed. This doctrine was put to a test in 1832. South Carolina passed the Ordinance of Nullification, and President Andrew Jackson threatened to send troops to the state to enforce the tariff. Edgefieldians, like most South Carolinians, reacted violently to the President's threats. Militia units were called up and the state braced for war. A national crisis was averted only by a last minute compromise that gradually reduced the tariffs.

Later, as the anti-slavery movement gained momentum and began to threaten the economic basis of the South's prosperity, most white Edgefieldians, like most white South Carolinians, embraced this sectionalism. National unity was again threatened in 1850 when many leaders throughout the South began to speak of secession. The 1856 caning of Senator Charles Sumner by Edgefield Congressman Preston Brooks on the floor of the United States Senate galvanized the nation and set South Carolina on a course for secession and Civil War. By the fall of 1860 when Abraham Lincoln was elected President, all but a few Edgefield citizens were convinced that the time had come for the South to go its own way. A convention was called and Edgefield's delegation joined in the unanimous declaration of secession.

=== Civil War and Reconstruction ===
At the outbreak of war in April 1861, the vast majority of Edgefieldians welcomed the conflict, believing that they would defeat the North in short order and the risk of slavery being outlawed would be eliminated. Hundreds of Edgefieldians volunteered for service and were quickly sent to Virginia to take on the federal forces. Little did they realize the sacrifices which they would make during the ensuing four years. Before the war was over almost every Edgefield male between the ages of 15 and 60 had been involved in some way in the war effort. Although the war never got closer than Aiken (Edgefieldians have always claimed that Sherman was afraid to come to Edgefield!), the people of Edgefield endured four bloody years in which nearly one-third of their fighting age white males became casualties. The incalculable devastation of the war is hard to comprehend. Almost all the liquid assets of the citizens had been invested in Confederate currency or bonds which were now worthless. The emancipation of the slaves wiped out a huge portion of the county's wealth, and giving them the right to vote brought an almost total reorganization of the political, economic, and social systems.

During the eleven-year period of Reconstruction, the newly freed slaves, called "freedmen", became sharecroppers, farming the land on shares with the landowners. They also acquired the right to vote and hold office. Together with "carpetbaggers" (Northerners who had come South seeking opportunities) and "scalawags" (Southern anti-slavery whites who had joined the Republican Party), the white population lost their control of local and state government. Intimidated by the occupying Federal troops, the white population were militarily and politically dominated by what they perceived as corrupt Republican administrations imposed upon them by force by their Northern enemies.

The Red Shirt Campaign of 1876, largely orchestrated by the former Confederate generals Martin W. Gary and M. C. Butler of Edgefield, was a massive organized effort on the part of the white population to regain control of the political machinery of the state. Violence was a calculated part of the strategy to remove Republican dominance. The Freedmen and their Republican allies tried valiantly to maintain their political control in the face of the fierce campaign by the former Confederates. By the middle of 1877 the Red Shirt strategy, along with an increasing willingness on the part of the rest of the nation to allow the South to go forward on its own terms, proved successful in bringing the control of the state back into the hands of the white population. In the ensuing decades the black population of Edgefield, like that of the entire South, was thrust back into second-class citizenship by the persistent efforts of the whites who were determined to see that the conditions of Reconstruction were never allowed to return.

=== Later 19th century ===
One of the principal results of the breakdown of the antebellum plantation system was that goods were no longer purchased centrally by the planters and then parceled out during the year, but rather freedmen and other small farmers purchased their own goods as they saw fit. This, together with the proliferation of manufactured consumer goods in the late 19th century, led to the development of a vigorous commercial economy in which every town and every crossroads sprouted new merchants. These new merchants, who often used questionable practices to benefit themselves at the expense of their customers, enjoyed a long period of prosperity.

During this period the village of Edgefield suffered a series of fires which destroyed practically all of the commercial area of the town except for the courthouse. In 1881 and 1884 the entire eastern and northern portions of the town were laid waste in devastating fires. In 1892 the southern and western sides of the Public Square were burned. A town ordinance was passed in 1884 requiring that all new buildings constructed within 500 feet of the town square be built of brick. It was from the ashes of these tragic fires that most of the current buildings of the town were raised. Prosperous merchants and other town leaders built new stores and, in many cases, they built grandly. The commercial district around the public square and down Main Street began to take shape.

The continuing development of railroads, such as the Charlotte, Columbia, and Augusta Railroad, built through the eastern part of the county in the late 1860s and the Augusta and Greenwood Railroad built through the western part of the county in the 1880s, resulted in the development of numerous railroad depot towns, including Ridge Spring, Ward, Johnston, Trenton, Clark's Hill, Modoc, Parksville, Plum Branch and McCormick. These new towns took on a prosperity of their own and began to sap commercial activity which might otherwise have come to Edgefield.

During this same period, the movement to bring government closer to the people resulted in the creation of a number of new counties, four of which took substantial portions of Edgefield. Aiken County was created in 1871; Saluda in 1895; Greenwood in 1897; and McCormick in 1916. Edgefield County, the area serviced by the Courthouse Village, was reduced in size to just over a quarter of what it had been.

The county's agricultural economy began to suffer in the 1880s. The combination of a dramatic increase in the production of cotton, the continued depletion of the rich soils of the piedmont regions of the county, and other general economic ills which were also affecting farmers throughout the nation, made farming increasingly difficult. One Edgefield farmer decided to do something about these problems. Benjamin Ryan Tillman, believing that the state's political leaders were not doing enough to help the farmers, instigated the farmers’ revolt, got himself elected Governor in 1890, and turned out of office the old guard of the state, including the principal leaders of the 1876 Red Shirt Campaign.

=== 20th century ===
In the thirty-odd year period from the late 1880s through the early 1920s a number of positive developments took place in Edgefield. The railroad finally reached Edgefield, the first telephone was installed, the Edgefield Mill was constructed, the first automobile came to town, electrical power was installed, water and sewer systems were built, a new hotel was constructed, and the streets around the town square were paved. As World War I proceeded, cotton prices shot up and a general prosperity prevailed. The town's population had exploded, going from approximately 500 in 1880 to 2,500 by 1920. Edgefield, it seemed, was finally getting back on its economic feet.

Unfortunately, beginning in 1921 and 1922, the boll weevil, which had come from Central America and had been marching across the South since the turn of the century, finally arrived in Edgefield County, devastating the cotton crop on which the economy was almost entirely based. Farmers saw their production of cotton plummet by as much as 90 percent. Lands which had been devoted to cotton for more than a century were allowed to go idle. Sharecroppers, no longer able to make a living, left the farms and many left the state. Throughout the 1920s farm incomes sank; merchants, unable to collect accounts from destitute farmers, were squeezed; banks failed. Then, when it seemed as if economic conditions could not get worse, the 1929 market crash and the Great Depression further impoverished the county. The population of Edgefield County began to decline and continued to decline in every census from 1920 to 1970.

World War II brought changes of other kinds. Young men throughout the county entered the service. A number of Edgefield families contributed multiple sons to the war effort. Former State Senator and Circuit Judge Strom Thurmond, West Side native J. L. Doolittle, Trenton native Fritz Huiet and Johnston native Robert Herlong all participated in the Normandy invasion. Women back home took on jobs which had traditionally been held by men. Rationing significantly affected everyone who remained in town.

After the war, the soldiers returning brought back with them a new confidence and an ambition to improve the county. A well-organized effort to bring new industry to Edgefield enjoyed moderate success as the Crest Manufacturing Company was brought to town in the late 1940s. The neighboring town of Johnston was more successful as it secured both the Milliken and Riegel plants during the 1940s and 1950s. In the 1960s Edgefield added to its list of new industrial recruits the National Cabinet Company, Star Fibers, Federal Pacific Electric, and Tranter, each bringing a substantial number of new jobs. During this same period, farmers on the eastern side of the county began to expand their production of peaches which, by the 1960s, had become nationally significant.

African-American soldiers had also fought valiantly in World War II, and when they returned, they came with a determination to improve their status in American society. A sustained campaign for Civil Rights developed at a national level in the late 1940s. The primary focus of this campaign was to overturn the "separate but equal" doctrine, legitimized by the 1896 Plessy v. Ferguson decision of the United States Supreme Court. In 1954 the court, in its unanimous Brown v. Board of Education decision, reversed the earlier decision and ruled that segregated facilities, even if equal, were unconstitutional.

The late 1960s and the early 1970s brought other new developments to Edgefield: a new water line capable of supplying the county for decades to come, a new country club, a new private school, a new county hospital, the National Wild Turkey Federation headquarters, and a new congressman, Butler C. Derrick, Jr.

Edgefield has rich clay deposits which provide the source for alkaline-glazed stoneware pottery which was developed by Dr. Abner Landrum in the early 19th century. The enslaved potter David Drake, who produced many large storage jars and other vessels between 1830 and 1870, was literate, inscribed and signed some of his work, and became more widely known more than a century after his death. Unsigned pottery from kilns in Pottersville and Edgefield today are known by the names of their owners; the artists were largely undocumented.

The upland area also was developed for cotton plantations, after invention of the cotton gin made growing short-staple cotton profitable. Several mansions and a plantation have been preserved from this era: Blocker House, Cedar Grove, Darby Plantation, and together with the Edgefield Historic District, Horn Creek Baptist Church, and Pottersville, are listed on the National Register of Historic Places.

== Demographics ==
Historical population
Census	Pop.	Note	%±
1860	518		—
1870	846		63.3%
1880	808		−4.5%
1890	1,168		44.6%
1900	1,775		52.0%
1910	1,771		−0.2%
1920	1,865		5.3%
1930	2,132		14.3%
1940	2,119		−0.6%
1950	2,518		18.8%
1960	2,876		14.2%
1970	2,750		−4.4%
1980	2,713		−1.3%
1990	2,563		−5.5%
2000	4,449		73.6%
2010	4,750		6.8%
2020	2,322		−51.1%
U.S. Decennial Census

=== 2000 census ===
As of the census of 2000, there were 4,449 people, 1,080 households, and 697 families residing in the town. The population density was 1,094.3 inhabitants per square mile (422.5/km^{2}). There were 1,229 housing units at an average density of 302.3 per square mile (116.7/km^{2}). The racial makeup of the town was 38.82% White, 59.92% African American, 0.49% Native American, 0.31% Asian, 0.18% from other races, and 0.27% from two or more races. Hispanic or Latino of any race were 4.47% of the population.

There were 1,080 households, out of which 28.9% had children under the age of 18 living with them, 37.8% were married couples living together, 23.2% had a female householder with no husband present, and 35.4% were non-families. 32.9% of all households were made up of individuals, and 16.9% had someone living alone who was 65 years of age or older. The average household size was 2.34 and the average family size was 2.96.

In the town, the population was spread out, with 14.1% under the age of 18, 9.0% from 18 to 24, 44.1% from 25 to 44, 20.0% from 45 to 64, and 12.8% who were 65 years of age or older. The median age was 36 years. For every 100 females, there were 195.6 males. For every 100 females age 18 and over, there were 221.4 males.

The median income for a household in the town was $24,977, and the median income for a family was $30,721. Males had a median income of $25,478 versus $23,462 for females. The per capita income for the town was $8,125. About 20.7% of families and 25.0% of the population were below the poverty line, including 35.1% of those under age 18 and 23.2% of those age 65 or over.

=== 2010 census ===
According to the 2010 Census, the town has a population of 4,750. Of this, 2,571 (54.13%) were Black or African American, 1,850 (38.95%) were White, 174 (3.66%) were some other race, 114 (2.40%) were two or more races, 21 (0.44%) were Asian, 16 (0.34%) were American Indian or Alaska Native. 4 (0.08%) were Native Hawaiian or Other Pacific Islander.

=== 2020 census ===
Edgefield racial composition
Race	Num.	Perc.
White (non-Hispanic)	969	41.73%
Black or African American (non-Hispanic)	1,221	52.58%
Native American	5	0.22%
Asian	14	0.6%
Other/Mixed	78	3.36%
Hispanic or Latino	35	1.51%

As of the 2020 United States census, there were 2,322 people, 1,248 households, and 693 families residing in the town.

== Education ==
Edgefield has a public library, a branch of the ABBE Regional Library System.

== Government ==
The Federal Bureau of Prisons Federal Correctional Institution, Edgefield is in Edgefield County; it is partially within the city limits of Edgefield, and partially in an unincorporated area.

== Notable people ==
- David Drake, African-American potter who lived and worked in Edgefield all his life. Etched rhyming couplets into his pottery in a time when many African-Americans were forbidden from literacy.
- Zachariah Bettis, born in Edgefield, later became probate judge of Clarke County, Alabama during the American Civil War
- James Longstreet was born on January 8, 1821, in Edgefield, South Carolina, an area that is now part of North Augusta, Edgefield County. Longstreet was one of the foremost Confederate generals of the American Civil War and the principal subordinate to General Robert E. Lee, who called him his "Old War Horse." He served under Lee as a corps commander for many of the battles fought by the Army of Northern Virginia in the Eastern Theater. As part of the Lost Cause of the Confederacy, Longstreet was inaccurately blamed for the Southern defeat at the Battle of Gettysburg, and therefore for the failure of the Confederacy to win independence.
- Chris Costner Sizemore, born in Edgefield, the woman with dissociative identity disorder on whose life the main character in the movie The Three Faces of Eve was based.
- Paris Simkins, freedman who founded the Macedonia Baptist Church in Edgefield and served in government during the Reconstruction period. He represented Edgefield from 1872-1876 in the South Carolina House of Representatives.
- Carey Wentworth Styles, founder of the Atlanta Constitution, who practiced law in Edgefield while publishing the Edgefield Informer, the newspaper that marked the beginning of his career in journalism.
- Strom Thurmond was born and died in Edgefield. He served as a Democrat, Dixiecrat and Republican in the US Senate, serving for 48 years. He left office as the only member of either house of Congress to reach the age of 100 while still in office, and as the oldest-serving and longest-serving senator in U.S. history (at that time).
- Edward G. Walker was born near Edgefield at Chappelle's Landing. He moved to Boston, Massachusetts in 1870 and later became an attorney, among the first black men to pass the bar in the state. He was elected to two terms as a state legislator, one of the first two black men to be elected to state office in Massachusetts.
- William Garrett Wright, American poet and editor, spent his early life in Edgefield.
