= National Register of Historic Places listings in Barnwell County, South Carolina =

Location of Barnwell County in South Carolina

This is a list of the National Register of Historic Places listings in Barnwell County, South Carolina.

This is intended to be a complete list of the properties on the National Register of Historic Places in Barnwell County, South Carolina, United States. The locations of National Register properties for which the latitude and longitude coordinates are included below, may be seen in a map.

There are six properties listed on the National Register in the county.

This National Park Service list is complete through NPS recent listings posted September 26, 2025.

== Current listings ==
	Name on the Register	Image	Date listed	Location	City or town	Description
1	Ashley-Willis House	Ashley-Willis House	June 22, 2004 (#04000650)	312 W. Main St. 33°24′12″N 81°25′37″W	Williston	
2	Banksia Hall	Banksia Hall	May 31, 1974 (#74001821)	108 Reynolds Rd. 33°14′45″N 81°21′44″W	Barnwell	
3	Bethlehem Baptist Church	Bethlehem Baptist Church	July 10, 1979 (#79002374)	Wall and Gilmore Sts. 33°14′44″N 81°21′55″W	Barnwell	
4	Church of the Holy Apostles Rectory	Church of the Holy Apostles Rectory	April 13, 1972 (#72001189)	1700 Hagood Ave. 33°14′21″N 81°21′50″W	Barnwell	
5	Church of the Holy Apostles, Episcopal	Church of the Holy Apostles, Episcopal	April 13, 1972 (#72001188)	1706 Hagood Ave. 33°14′23″N 81°21′49″W	Barnwell	
6	Old Presbyterian Church	Old Presbyterian Church	April 13, 1972 (#72001190)	1905 Academy St. 33°14′33″N 81°21′40″W	Barnwell	

== See also ==
- List of National Historic Landmarks in South Carolina
- National Register of Historic Places listings in South Carolina
