= South Carolina Highway 304 =

Highway in South Carolina

South Carolina Highway 304

Route information
- Maintained by SCDOT
- Length: 5.880 mi (9.463 km)
- Existed: 1939–present

Major junctions
- South end: Main Street in Hilda
- US 78 in Blackville
- North end: US 78 Bus. in Blackville

Location
- Country: United States
- State: South Carolina
- Counties: Barnwell

Highway system
- South Carolina State Highway System; Interstate; US; State; Scenic
← SC 303	→ SC 308

South Carolina Highway 304 (SC 304) is a 5.880-mile-long (9.463 km) state highway in the U.S. state of South Carolina. The highway connects Hilda and Blackville.

== Route description ==
SC 304 begins at an intersection with Main Street in Hilda, Barnwell County, where the roadway continues as Collins Avenue. It travels to the north-northwest and intersects SC 70 (Barnwell Road). It continues to the north-northwest before leaving the city limits. The highway passes by Brooker Pond and enters Blackville. It passes Lake Cynthia and the Jefferson Davis Academy before it curves to a nearly due north direction. The highway intersects U.S. Route 78 (US 78; Dexter Street). About one block later, it meets its northern terminus, an intersection with US 78 Business (Main Street, which is internally designated as US 78 Connector).

== Major intersections ==
The entire route is in Barnwell County.

Location	mi	km	Destinations	Notes
Hilda	0.000	0.000	East Main Street east / Collins Avenue south	Southern terminus of SC 304; western terminus of East Main Street; Collins Avenue continues past intersection.
Hilda	0.640	1.030	SC 70 (Barnwell Road) – Barnwell, Denmark	
Blackville	5.780	9.302	US 78 (Dexter Street) – Williston, Denmark	
Blackville	5.880	9.463	US 78 Bus. (Main Street / US 78 Conn.) / Lartigue Street north	Northern terminus; Lartigue Street continues past intersection.
1.000 mi = 1.609 km; 1.000 km = 0.621 mi
