= South Carolina Highway 70 =

State highway in South Carolina, United States

South Carolina Highway 70

Route information
- Maintained by SCDOT
- Length: 29.990 mi (48.264 km)
- Existed: 1938–present

Major junctions
- West end: US 278 / SC 64 in Barnwell
- US 321 in Denmark; US 78 in Denmark
- East end: US 301 / US 601 near Cordova

Location
- Country: United States
- State: South Carolina
- Counties: Barnwell, Bamberg, Orangeburg

Highway system
- South Carolina State Highway System; Interstate; US; State; Scenic
← SC 68	→ SC 71

South Carolina Highway 70 (SC 70) is a 29.990-mile (48.264 km) primary state highway in the U.S. state of South Carolina. It connects the cities of Barnwell and Denmark with Orangeburg via U.S. Route 301 (US 301) and US 601.

== Route description ==
SC 70 is connected together with barnwell, Denmark, Orangeburg and Allen St And Main St is Connected together

== History ==
It was established around 1938 as a new primary routing from SC 64 in Barnwell to SC 6 in Denmark. In 1940, SC 70 was extended in both directions: west in concurrency with SC 64 to the Salkehatchie River, and east on new primary routing to SC 332. In 1941 or 1942, SC 70 was extended southwest on new primary routing to SC 28, then in concurrency with it to Martin, where it went southeast as new routing to SC 631. This would be SC 70 longest length with it reaching over 42 miles (68 km) long.

In 1948, SC 70 was converted back to its original 1938 routing between Barnwell and Denmark; however a four-mile (6.4 km) section also existed between Martin and SC 37. All roads not in concurrency were reverted to secondary status.

Around 1952, the Martin to SC 37 piece of SC 70 was downgraded to secondary status, becoming Revolutionary Trail (S-3-47). Around 1958, SC 70 was re-extended east of Denmark to its current eastern terminus with US 301/US 601.

== Major intersections ==
County	Location	mi	km	Destinations	Notes
Barnwell	Barnwell	0.000	0.000	US 278 / SC 64 / Dunbarton Boulevard – Williston, Aiken, Allendale, Charleston	Western terminus
Barnwell	Barnwell	0.420	0.676	SC 3 (Marlboro Avenue) – Allendale, Columbia	To Barnwell State Park
Barnwell	Hilda	7.300	11.748	SC 304 (Hilda Road / Broughton Street) – Hilda, Blackville	
Bamberg	Denmark	14.540	23.400	US 321 south (Carolina Highway) – Olar, Savannah	Western end of US 321 concurrency
Bamberg	Denmark	14.820	23.850	US 78 (Heritage Highway) – Bamberg, Charleston, Blackville, Aiken	To Barnwell State Park
Bamberg	Denmark	15.220	24.494	US 321 north (Carolina Highway) – Norway, Columbia	Eastern end of US 321 concurrency
Orangeburg		22.590	36.355	SC 332 (Cope Road) – Cope, Norway	
Orangeburg		29.990	48.264	US 301 / US 601 (Bamberg Highway) – Bamberg, Orangeburg	Eastern terminus
1.000 mi = 1.609 km; 1.000 km = 0.621 mi: Concurrency terminus

== Barnwell alternate route ==
South Carolina Highway 70 Alternate
- Location: Barnwell
- Existed: c.1939–1947

South Carolina Highway 70 Alternate (SC 70 Alt.) was an alternate route that existed in the southeastern part of Barnwell. It was established by 1940 on a backwards L-shaped path from SC 3 east-northeast on Hagood Avenue, then north-northwest on Carolina Avenue, to end at SC 70. In 1947, it was decommissioned.
