= Marcus McKethan =

American football player (born 1999)

Profile
- Position: Guard

Personal information
- Born: May 19, 1999 (age 27); Barnwell, South Carolina, U.S.
- Listed height: 6 ft 7 in (2.01 m)
- Listed weight: 343 lb (156 kg)

Career information
- High school: Barnwell
- College: North Carolina (2017–2021)
- NFL draft: 2022: 5th round, 173rd overall pick

Career history
- New York Giants (2022–2024)

Career NFL statistics as of 2024
- Games played: 16
- Games started: 5
- Stats at Pro Football Reference

Marcus McKethan (born May 19, 1999) is an American professional football guard. He played college football at North Carolina and was drafted by the Giants in the fifth round of the 2022 NFL draft.

== College career ==
McKethan was ranked as a three–star recruit by 247Sports.com coming out of high school. He committed to North Carolina on June 22, 2016, over an offer from NC State.

== Professional career ==
Pre-draft measurables
Height	Weight	Arm length	Hand span	Wingspan	40-yard dash	10-yard split	20-yard split	20-yard shuttle	Three-cone drill	Vertical jump	Broad jump	Bench press
6 ft 6 1/2 in (1.99 m)	340 lb (154 kg)	35 1/2 in (0.90 m)	10 1/2 in (0.27 m)	7 ft 1 7/8 in (2.18 m)	5.31 s	1.85 s	3.06 s	4.99 s	7.81 s	27.5 in (0.70 m)	9 ft 2 in (2.79 m)	27 reps
All values from NFL Combine

McKethan was drafted by the New York Giants with the 173rd pick in the fifth round of the 2022 NFL draft. On August 6, 2022, McKethan was placed on injured reserve with a torn ACL.

McKethan got his first career start in week 2 of the 2023 season against the Arizona Cardinals.

On August 25, 2024, McKethan was waived by the Giants.
