= Church of the Holy Apostles Rectory =

- U.S. National Register of Historic Places
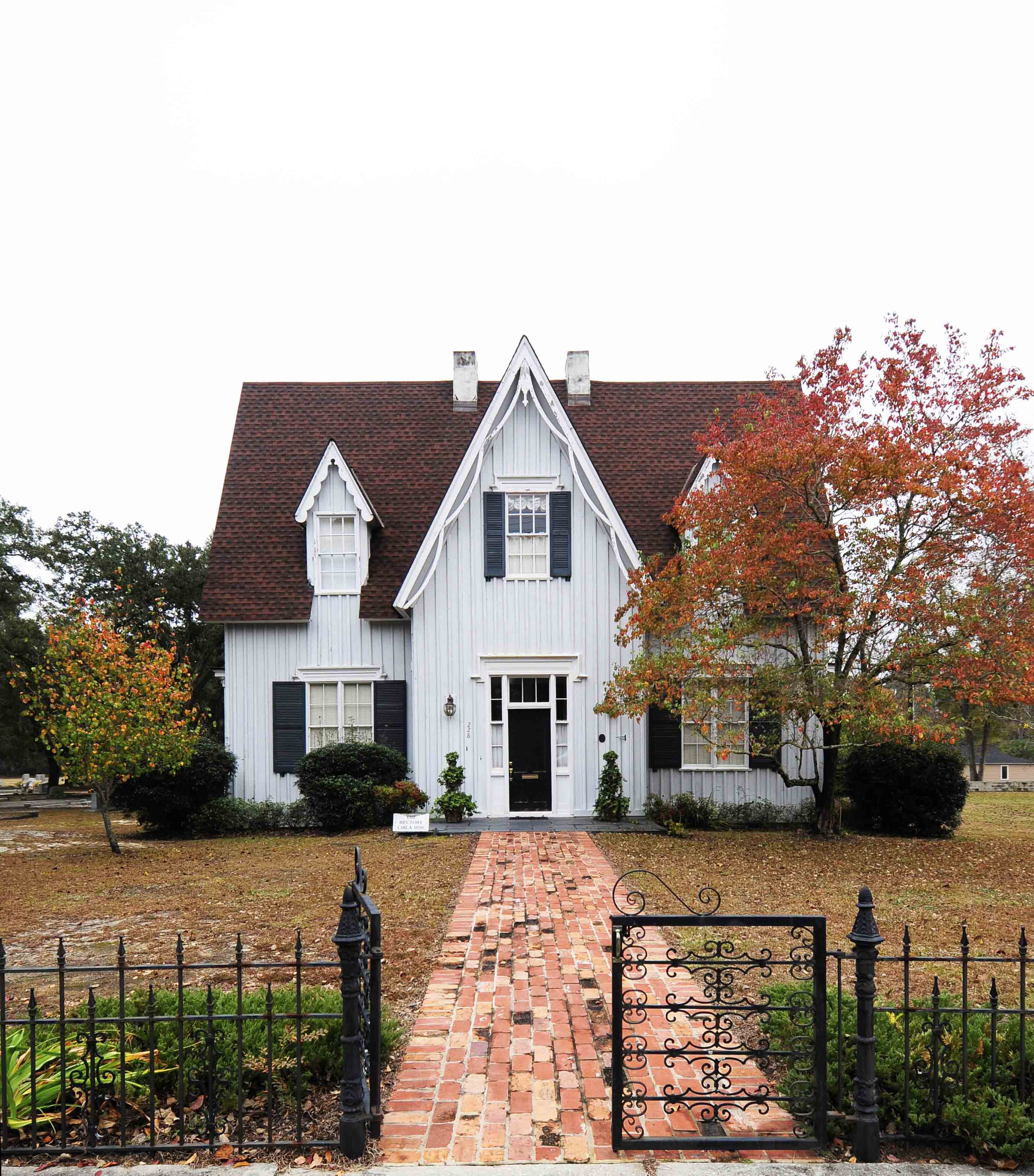

- Location within South Carolina Location within the United States
- Location: 1700 Hagood Avenue, Barnwell, South Carolina
- Coordinates: 33°14′21″N 81°21′50.0″W
- Area: 0.5 acres (0.20 ha)
- Built: before 1857
- Architectural style: Carpenter Gothic
- NRHP reference No.: 720011890
- Added to NRHP: April 13, 1972

The Church of the Holy Apostles Rectory is an historic Carpenter Gothic house located at 1700 Hagood Avenue in Barnwell, South Carolina, On April 13, 1972, it was added to the National Register of Historic Places. It is also known as the Roberts House, the Old Patterson House, or The Rectory.

== History ==
The Rev. Edwin Wagner, first rector of the Church of the Holy Apostles, had this house built before 1857 on land that he owned. He deeded part of the land adjacent to his house to the church for the erection of a church and cemetery. The house, though, remained in separate ownership from the church until recently. Later owners include James T. Aldrich and Dr. Angus Bethune Patterson, who both served in the South Carolina General Assembly.

== See also ==
- List of Registered Historic Places in South Carolina
