= Shelly Hammonds =

American football player (born 1971)

No. 23
- Position: Defensive back

Personal information
- Born: February 13, 1971 (age 55); Barnwell, South Carolina, U.S.
- Listed height: 5 ft 10 in (1.78 m)
- Listed weight: 189 lb (86 kg)

Career information
- High school: Barnwell (SC)
- College: Penn State
- NFL draft: 1994: 5th round, 134th overall pick

Career history
- Minnesota Vikings (1994)*; Minnesota Vikings (1995)
- * Offseason or practice squad member only

Awards and highlights
- Second-team All-Big Ten (1993)
- Stats at Pro Football Reference

Shelton Cornelius Hammonds (born February 13, 1971) is an American former professional football player who was a defensive back in the National Football League (NFL).

== Biography ==
Hammonds was born in Barnwell, South Carolina, and attended Barnwell High School. He played college football for the Penn State Nittany Lions. He was a running back for the Nittany Lions from 1990 to 1991 before playing defensive back from 1992 to 1993.

Hammonds was drafted in the fifth round of the 1994 NFL draft by the Minnesota Vikings. He spent two seasons on the team's practice squad, during which he was activated for one game, September 24, 1995, vs the Pittsburgh Steelers.
