= 1995 Blackville–Hilda High School shooting =

School shooting

Coordinates: 33°21′50″N 81°15′50″W

- Location: Blackville, South Carolina, United States
- Date: October 12, 1995
- Target: Teachers
- Attack type: School shooting, murder-suicide
- Weapon: .32 caliber revolver
- Deaths: 2 (including the perpetrator)
- Injuries: 1
- Perpetrator: Anthony Sincino
- Motive: Suspension

The Blackville–Hilda High School shooting was a school shooting that occurred on October 12, 1995, at Blackville–Hilda High School in Blackville, South Carolina, United States. The gunman, 16-year-old Anthony Sincino, was a student at Blackville–Hilda High School who was suspended from school at the time of the shooting. He fatally shot one teacher and wounded another teacher before committing suicide.

== Incident ==
On October 12, 1995, the perpetrator entered through a back door armed with a .32 caliber revolver and entered the classroom of a math teacher Johnny Thompson and shot him in the face. He exited the room and confronted another math teacher Phyllis Senn who was later found dead in the teachers work room. Ms. Senn was believed to have died of a heart attack but an autopsy revealed that she was killed by a gun shot. She was hit once in the back of her right shoulder, and the bullet entered a lung, causing her to bleed out rapidly.

A student that was in the room across the hall from the first victim, stated that Sincino did not look angry or mad during the shooting, but that he looked like he did not know exactly what he was doing.

Sincino's body was later found outside the school office door after he committed suicide by shooting himself in the right temple.

== Perpetrator ==
Sincino was African American, and all the people who he attacked or attempted to attack (such as the school's principal, who Sincino allegedly stalked for some time prior to the shooting) were white, which fueled speculation that the shooting was racially motivated, an assertion backed by Sincino's mother, who blamed her son's actions on him being the victim of Institutional racism. Sincino had a history of disciplinary problems within the school, which he was expelled from in 1994, subsequently facing another expulsion for making obscene hand gestures on a school bus after he was readmitted in 1995. These disciplinary actions were regarded as being unnecessarily harsh by people like Sincino's friend Latisha Grant, and there was a pervasive belief in the community that this was due to Sincino being African American.

== See also ==
- List of school shootings in the United States by death toll
