= Hilda, South Carolina =

- Town
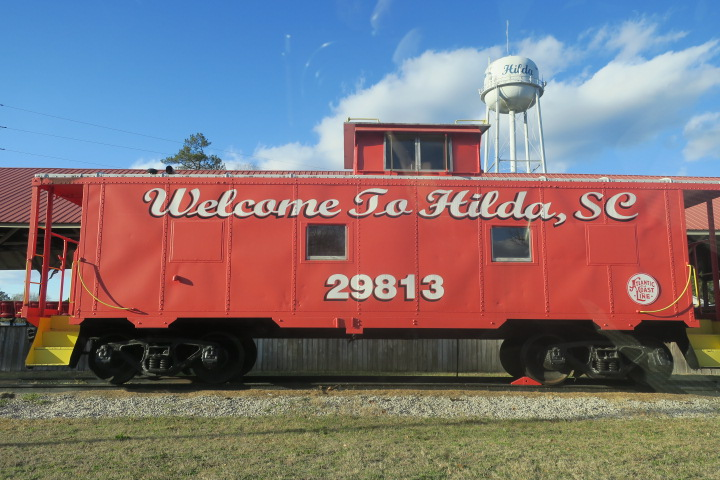

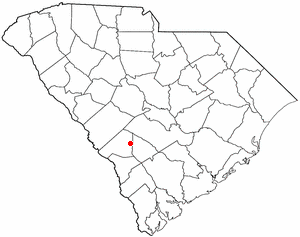
- Location of Hilda, South Carolina
- Coordinates: 33°16′26″N 81°15′04″W
- Country: United States
- State: South Carolina
- County: Barnwell

Area
  - Total: 3.11 sq mi (8.05 km^{2})
  - Land: 3.07 sq mi (7.95 km^{2})
  - Water: 0.039 sq mi (0.10 km^{2})
- Elevation: 262 ft (80 m)

Population (2020)
  - Total: 418
  - Density: 136.1/sq mi (52.56/km^{2})
- Time zone: UTC-5 (Eastern (EST))
  - Summer (DST): UTC-4 (EDT)
- ZIP code: 29813
- Area codes: 803, 839
- FIPS code: 45-33820
- GNIS feature ID: 2405834

Hilda is a town in Barnwell County, South Carolina, United States. As of the 2020 census, Hilda had a population of 418.

== Geography ==
Hilda is located in eastern Barnwell County. South Carolina Highway 70 passes through the town north of its center, leading west 7 miles (11 km) to Barnwell, the county seat, and east 7 miles (11 km) to Denmark. South Carolina Highway 304 leads north 5 miles (8 km) to Blackville.

According to the United States Census Bureau, Hilda has a total area of 3.1 square miles (8.1 km^{2}), of which 3.1 square miles (8.0 km^{2}) is land and 0.04 square miles (0.1 km^{2}), or 1.22%, is water.

== Demographics ==
Historical population
Census	Pop.	Note	%±
1940	246		—
1950	304		23.6%
1960	259		−14.8%
1970	331		27.8%
1980	355		7.3%
1990	342		−3.7%
2000	436		27.5%
2010	447		2.5%
2020	418		−6.5%
U.S. Decennial Census

As of the census of 2000, there were 436 people, 179 households, and 115 families living in the town. The population density was 142.1 inhabitants per square mile (54.9/km^{2}). There were 204 housing units at an average density of 66.5 per square mile (25.7/km^{2}). The racial makeup of the town was 91.51% White, 6.88% African American, 0.46% Native American, 0.69% Asian, and 0.46% from two or more races.

There were 179 households, out of which 37.4% had children under the age of 18 living with them, 49.2% were married couples living together, 10.1% had a female householder with no husband present, and 35.2% were non-families. 31.3% of all households were made up of individuals, and 14.5% had someone living alone who was 65 years of age or older. The average household size was 2.44 and the average family size was 3.09.

In the town, the population was spread out, with 28.7% under the age of 18, 10.8% from 18 to 24, 25.0% from 25 to 44, 20.9% from 45 to 64, and 14.7% who were 65 years of age or older. The median age was 33 years. For every 100 females, there were 96.4 males. For every 100 females age 18 and over, there were 92.0 males.

The median income for a household in the town was $21,771, and the median income for a family was $30,833. Males had a median income of $28,125 versus $20,000 for females. The per capita income for the town was $11,368. About 21.1% of families and 23.8% of the population were below the poverty line, including 23.1% of those under age 18 and 30.6% of those age 65 or over.
