= Henry Taylor (American football) =

American football player (born 1975)

No. 96, 79, 98, 56
- Position: Defensive tackle

Personal information
- Born: November 29, 1975 (age 50); Broward County, Florida, U.S.
- Listed height: 6 ft 2 in (1.88 m)
- Listed weight: 295 lb (134 kg)

Career information
- High school: Barnwell (Barnwell, South Carolina)
- College: South Carolina
- NFL draft: 1998: undrafted

Career history
- San Diego Chargers (1998)*; Detroit Lions (1998–1999); → Amsterdam Admirals (1999)*; → Frankfurt Galaxy (2000); Atlanta Falcons (2000); Chicago Bears (2001); Miami Dolphins (2001); Dallas Desperados (2003–2004); New Orleans VooDoo (2004); Nashville Kats (2005); Orlando Predators (2006); New Orleans VooDoo (2007); New York Dragons (2008); Jacksonville Sharks (2010); Orlando Predators (2013)
- * Offseason or practice squad member only

Awards and highlights
- 2× First-team All-Arena (2006, 2008); Second-team All-SEC (1997)

Career NFL statistics
- Tackles: 7
- Stats at Pro Football Reference

Career AFL statistics
- Tackles: 130.5
- Sacks: 37.5
- Pass breakups: 6
- Forced fumbles: 9
- Fumble recoveries: 4
- Stats at ArenaFan.com

Henry Taylor (born November 29, 1975) is an American former professional football player who was a defensive tackle in the National Football League (NFL) and Arena Football League (AFL). He was signed by the San Diego Chargers of the NFL as an undrafted free agent in 1998. He played college football for the South Carolina Gamecocks.

Taylor played for the Detroit Lions, Atlanta Falcons, Chicago Bears and Miami Dolphins of the NFL, the Dallas Desperados, New Orleans VooDoo, Nashville Kats, Orlando Predators, New York Dragons and Jacksonville Sharks of the AFL, and the Frankfurt Galaxy of NFL Europe.

== Early life ==
Taylor was born in Broward County, Florida. He played high school football at Barnwell High School in Barnwell, South Carolina as a tight end and defensive tackle. He totaled 82 tackles, 12 sacks and seven forced fumbles his senior year, earning all-state and class AA Lineman of the Year honors. Taylor graduated from Barnwell in 1994.

== College career ==
Taylor played college football for the South Carolina Gamecocks from 1994 to 1997. He played in 10 games, starting two, his freshman year in 1994, recording 14 tackles, one sack and one fumble recovery. He appeared in 11 games, starting 10, in 1995, accumulating 26 tackles, 2.5 sacks, two fumble recoveries, one interception and two pass breakups while also being named to the SEC Academic Honor Roll. Taylor appeared in 11 games, starting 10, for the second consecutive season in 1996, recording 50 tackles, 3.5 sacks, and two fumble recoveries. He played in 11 games, starting 10, for the third straight year in 1997, totaling 46 tackles and 5.5 sacks, earning second-team All-SEC.

== Professional career ==
Taylor signed with the San Diego Chargers on April 20, 1998 after going undrafted in the 1998 NFL draft. He was released on July 13, re-signed on July 31 and released again on August 25, 1998.

Taylor was signed to the practice squad of the Detroit Lions on September 2, 1998. He was later promoted to the active roster and played in one game for the Lions during the 1998 season, recording two solo tackles. He was placed on injured reserve on December 19, 1998. Taylor was allocated to the Amsterdam Admirals of NFL Europe in 1999 but did not play in any games for the team. He was released by the Lions on September 5, 1999 but re-signed to the practice squad two days later. Taylor was allocated to NFL Europe for the second straight year in 2000, playing for the Frankfurt Galaxy during the 2000 NFL Europe season. He appeared in 10 games, starting nine, for the Galaxy, recording 26 tackles and six sacks. Taylor was released by the Lions on August 27, 2000.

Taylor signed with the Atlanta Falcons on November 1, 2000 and played in five games for the Falcons in 2000, totaling four solo tackles. He was released on March 28, 2001.

Taylor was signed by the Chicago Bears on July 27, 2001. He appeared in one game for the Bears during the 2001 season but recorded no statistics. On October 5, 2001, he was suspended four games for violating the NFL's steroid policy. Taylor was released by the Bears on October 29, 2001.

Taylor signed with the Miami Dolphins on December 4, 2001 and played in two games for the Dolphins in 2001, making one solo tackle.

Taylor was signed by the Dallas Desperados of the Arena Football League (AFL) on January 3, 2003. He spent time playing both offensive line and defensive line during his time in the AFL as the league played under ironman rules. He was placed on injured reserve on January 28, 2003. Taylor played in nine games, starting one, for the Desperados in 2003, accumulating seven solo tackles, three assisted tackles, one sack, one forced fumble and one fumble recovery. He appeared in 12 games in 2004, totaling 18 solo tackles, 3 assisted tackles, four sacks and one forced fumble. He was waived by the Desperados on May 11, 2004.

Taylor signed with the New Orleans VooDoo of the AFL on May 14, 2004. He appeared in two games for the VooDoo in 2004, recording one solo tackle.

Taylor was signed by the AFL's Nashville Kats on October 14, 2004. He played in all 16 games for the Kats during the 2005 season, accumulating 11 solo tackles, eight assisted tackles, 4.5 sacks and one forced fumble.

On October 20, 2005, Taylor was traded to the Orlando Predators for Cory Fleming. He played in all 16 games for the second straight year in 2006, recording 14 solo tackles, four assisted tackles, eight sacks, one pass breakup and one fumble recovery, earning first-team All-Arena honors. He also caught 6 passes for 26 yards and one touchdown.

Taylor returned to the VooDoo for the 2007 season and appeared in 14 games, totaling 19 solo tackles, three assisted tackles, eight sacks, four forced fumbles and three pass breakups.

On August 30, 2007, Taylor and Jamar Martin were traded to the New York Dragons for Mike Horacek and future considerations. Taylor accumulated 10 solo tackles, eight assisted tackles, 8.5 sacks, one forced fumble, two fumble recoveries and one pass breakup for the Dragons in 2008, garnering first-team All-Arena recognition for the second time. The 2009 AFL season was cancelled.

Taylor was assigned to the Jacksonville Sharks of the AFL on February 19, 2010. He was placed on refuse to report on March 14 and was activated on March 29, 2010. He recorded seven solo tackles, three assisted tackles, 3.5 sacks, one forced fumble and one pass breakup in 2010.

Taylor was assigned to the Predators on August 1, 2013.
