= Joe Thomas (linebacker) =

American football player (born 1991)

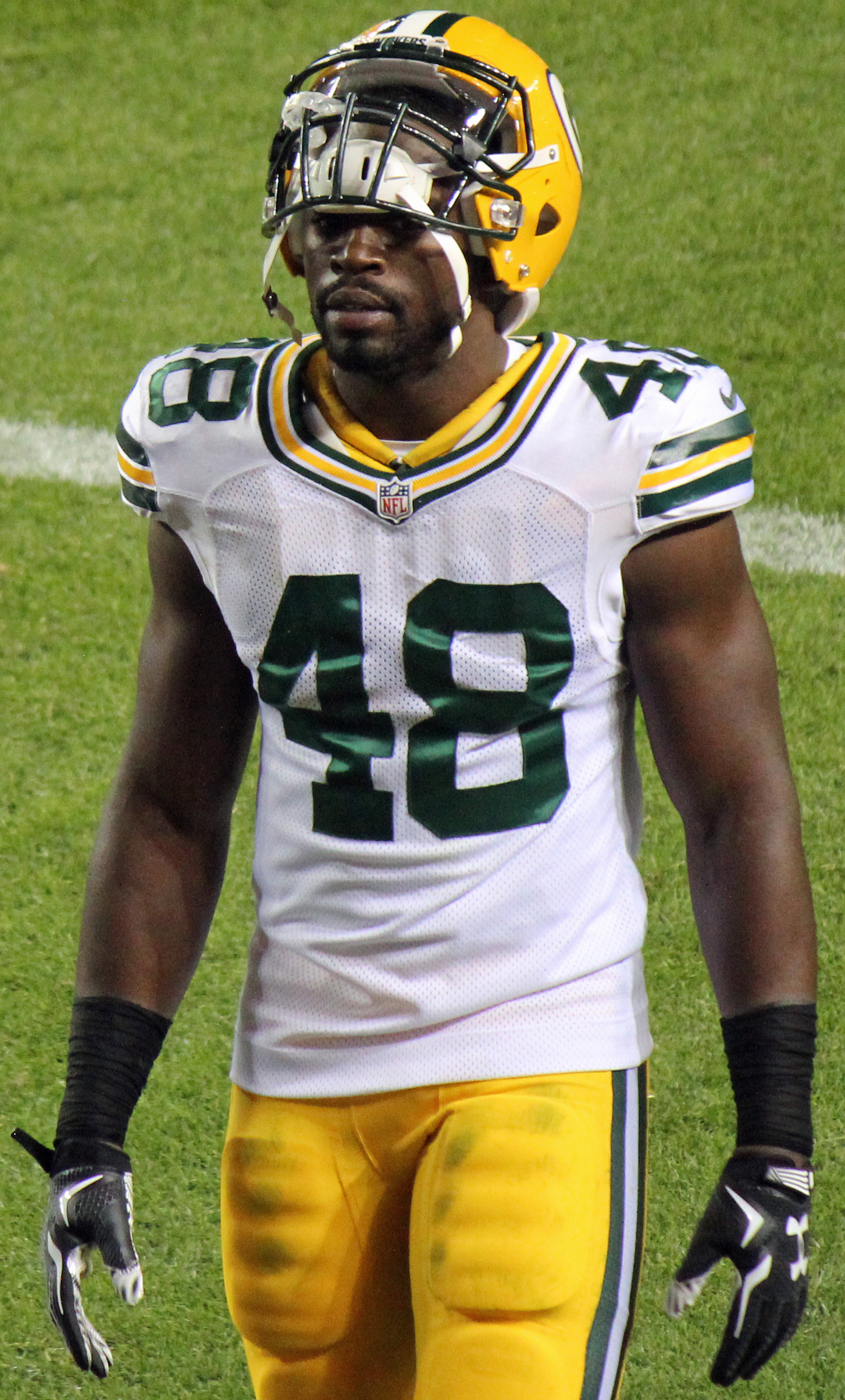
- Thomas with the Green Bay Packers in 2015

No. 48, 58, 45
- Position: Linebacker

Personal information
- Born: May 6, 1991 (age 35); Aiken, South Carolina, U.S.
- Listed height: 6 ft 1 in (1.85 m)
- Listed weight: 233 lb (106 kg)

Career information
- High school: Blackville-Hilda (Blackville, South Carolina)
- College: South Carolina State
- NFL draft: 2014: undrafted

Career history
- Green Bay Packers (2014–2015)*; Dallas Cowboys (2015)*; Green Bay Packers (2015–2017); Dallas Cowboys (2018–2020); Houston Texans (2021); Baltimore Ravens (2021); Chicago Bears (2022)
- * Offseason or practice squad member only

Awards and highlights
- All-MEAC (2013); MEAC Defensive Player of the Year (2013)

Career NFL statistics
- Total tackles: 279
- Sacks: 2.5
- Forced fumbles: 2
- Fumble recoveries: 2
- Pass deflections: 12
- Interceptions: 1
- Stats at Pro Football Reference

Joe Lewis Thomas Jr. (born May 6, 1991) is an American former professional football player who was a linebacker in the National Football League (NFL). He played college football for the South Carolina State Bulldogs, and was signed by the Green Bay Packers as an undrafted free agent in 2014.

== Early life ==
Thomas attended Blackville-Hilda High School, where he practiced football, basketball, track and soccer. In football he played as a running back, earning All-state honors in his last two years. As a senior, he rushed for 1,976 yards and 31 touchdowns, while being named Division 1A South Carolina Player of the Year.

In track, he competed in the 4 × 100 metres relay and the shot put.

== College career ==
Thomas accepted a football scholarship from South Carolina State University. As a redshirt freshman, he played in 11 out of 12 games, contributing mainly on special teams, while posting 17 tackles (2 for loss), one pass defensed and a fumble recovery.

As a sophomore, he started 11 games at outside linebacker, recording 100 tackles (second on the team), 5 tackles for loss, 2.5 sacks, 3 interceptions (led the team) and a fumble recovery. He was named the team's defensive MVP at the end of the season. In his first career start at Central Michigan University, he had 10 tackles (three solo) and his first career interception. Against Indiana University, he made 14 tackles (7 solo). Against Georgia State University, he had 14 tackles (one for loss) and one interception.

As a junior, he started the first 6 games at middle linebacker, before being lost for the season with an injury. Against North Carolina Central University, he had 39 tackles (5 for loss), one sack, one pass defensed and a forced fumble. Against Bethune-Cookman University, he made 11 tackles (3 tackles for loss) and one sack. Against the University of Arizona, he had 10 tackles (8 solo) and a forced fumble.

As a senior, he was a part of a defense that ranked No. 1 in the FCS 1-AA. He helped the school earn its 15th MEAC Championship, winning 17–3 against Norfolk State University, where he made 10 tackles (4 for a loss), and one sack. He started 13 games, registering 115 tackles (led the team), 19 tackles for loss, 7.5 sacks, 5 passes defensed, one interception, one forced fumble and a fumble recovery. Against Alabama A&M University, he had 12 tackles (5 for loss), 3 sacks and one pass defensed. Against Bethune-Cookman University, he made 16 tackles (9 solo), one sack and a fumble recovery. He also earned Mid-Eastern Athletic Conference Defensive Player of the Year and All-conference honors.

He finished his college career with 41 games (30 starts), 271 tackles (188 solo), 31 tackles for loss, 11.5 sacks, 4 interceptions, 9 passes defensed, 2 forced fumbles and 3 fumble recoveries.

== Professional career ==
Pre-draft measurables
Height	Weight	Arm length	Hand span	Wingspan	40-yard dash	10-yard split	20-yard split	20-yard shuttle	Three-cone drill	Vertical jump	Broad jump	Bench press
6 ft 0 5/8 in (1.84 m)	227 lb (103 kg)	31 1/4 in (0.79 m)	9 5/8 in (0.24 m)	6 ft 4 1/4 in (1.94 m)	4.70 s	1.58 s	2.77 s	4.64 s	7.45 s	38 in (0.97 m)	9 ft 9 in (2.97 m)	22 reps
All values from Pro Day

=== Green Bay Packers (first stint) ===
Thomas was signed as an undrafted free agent by the Green Bay Packers after the 2014 NFL draft on May 12. On August 26, 2014, he was placed on the Injured reserve list with a knee injury. Thomas was released after reaching an injury settlement on August 30. On November 3, he was signed to the Packers' practice squad, where he spent the rest of his rookie season.

Thomas was signed to a future contract on January 20, 2015. He was waived on September 5.

=== Dallas Cowboys (first stint) ===
Thomas was signed to the Dallas Cowboys' practice squad on September 8, 2015.

=== Green Bay Packers (second stint) ===
On September 21, 2015, Thomas was signed to the Packers' active roster off the Cowboys' practice squad, to provide depth after Jake Ryan was injured. He appeared in 14 games, making 24 tackles (16 solo), one sack, one forced fumble, 4 quarterback pressures, 2 passes defensed and 9 special teams tackles (fourth on the team). He played in the 2 playoff games and had eight tackles.

In 2016, he appeared in 16 games (7 starts) at inside linebacker, making 77 total tackles (fourth on the team), 62 solo tackles, 8 passes defensed, one interception and one fumble recovery. He recorded his first NFL interception against Blake Bortles and the Jacksonville Jaguars in Week 1. He collected 10 tackles both against the Seattle Seahawks and Chicago Bears. On December 18, Thomas laid a hit on Chicago's Ka'Deem Carey with so much force, that the "C" decal on Carey's helmet flew off. The Packers won the game 30–27. He played in all 3 playoff games (2 starts), tying for No. 4 on the team with 13 tackles.

Thomas re-signed with the Packers on March 7, 2017. He appeared in 12 games (one start), missing 4 contests with an ankle injury. He finished with 14 tackles, a half sack and one pass defensed.

=== Dallas Cowboys (second stint) ===
On March 21, 2018, Thomas signed a two-year deal with the Cowboys. He was a backup linebacker, appearing in 10 games, after suffering a foot injury in the Week 5 game against the Houston Texans and missing next four games. He posted 6 tackles (one for loss), one quarterback pressure and 5 special teams tackles (sixth on the team).

In 2019, he appeared in 15 games with 2 starts, playing mostly on special teams. He registered 36 tackles, one quarterback pressure, one forced fumble, one pass deflection and 5 special teams tackles (tied for fifth on the team). He had a season-high 6 tackles in the third game against the Miami Dolphins. He made 3 tackles, one quarterback pressure, one pass breakup, one forced fumble and 2 special teams tackles in the fourteenth game against the Chicago Bears. He made his first start as a Cowboy in place of an injured Vander Esch in the fourteenth game against the Los Angeles Rams, tallying 2 tackles before leaving with a knee injury. He started again in the next game against the Philadelphia Eagles. He was declared inactive with a knee injury in the season finale against the Washington Redskins.

On March 31, 2020, Thomas re-signed with the Cowboys. He was released on September 6, 2020, but re-signed the next day. He stepped in when starter Leighton Vander Esch suffered an injury in the first quarter of the season opener against Los Angeles Rams. He started the next 4 games at middle linebacker, after Vander Esch was placed on the injured reserve list. He had a career-high 12 tackles (one for loss) in the second game against the Atlanta Falcons. He finished with 43 tackles (3 for loss), 2 passes defensed and 5 quarterback pressures in 15 games with 4 starts.

=== Houston Texans ===
Thomas signed a one-year contract with the Houston Texans on March 22, 2021. He was released on October 16, 2021. He appeared in 5 games with 2 starts, making 10 defensive tackles and 2 special teams tackles.

=== Baltimore Ravens ===
On October 19, 2021, Thomas was signed to the Baltimore Ravens practice squad. He appeared in 2 games and had one tackle.

=== Chicago Bears ===
On March 1, 2022, Thomas signed a one-year contract with the Chicago Bears. He was released on August 31, 2022, and signed to the practice squad the next day. He was promoted to the active roster on September 27. He appeared in 15 games with 9 starts at outside linebacker, after Roquan Smith was traded and other players were injured. He posted 61 defensive tackles (4 for loss), one sack, 2 passes defensed, one fumble recovery and 4 special teams tackles. He wasn't re-signed after the season.

== NFL career statistics ==
=== Regular season ===
Year	Team	GP	GS	Tackles					Interceptions						Fumbles	
Year	Team	GP	GS	Total	Solo	Ast	Sck	SFTY	PDef	Int	Yds	Avg	Lng	TDs	FF	FR
2015	GB	14	0	26	23	3	1.0	0	1	0	0	0.0	0	0	1	0
2016	GB	16	7	70	55	15	0.0	0	5	1	9	9.0	9	0	0	0
2017	GB	12	1	14	6	8	0.5	0	1	0	0	0.0	0	0	0	0
2018	DAL	10	0	14	7	7	0.0	0	0	0	0	0.0	0	0	0	0
2019	DAL	15	2	33	21	12	0.0	0	1	0	0	0.0	0	0	0	0
2020	DAL	15	4	48	30	18	0.0	0	2	0	0	0.0	0	0	0	0
2021	HOU	5	2	12	9	3	0.0	0	0	0	0	0.0	0	0	0	0
2021	BAL	2	0	1	0	1	0.0	0	0	0	0	0.0	0	0	0	0
2022	CHI	15	9	61	35	26	1.0	0	2	0	0	0.0	0	0	0	1
Total		104	25	279	186	93	2.5	0	12	1	9	9.0	9	0	1	1
Source: NFL.com

=== Postseason ===
Year	Team	GP	GS	Tackles					Interceptions						Fumbles	
Year	Team	GP	GS	Total	Solo	Ast	Sck	SFTY	PDef	Int	Yds	Avg	Lng	TDs	FF	FR
2015	GB	2	0	8	5	3	0.0	0	0	0	0	0.0	0	0	0	0
2016	GB	3	2	11	8	3	0.0	0	2	0	0	0.0	0	0	0	0
Total		5	2	19	13	6	0.0	0	2	0	0	0.0	0	0	0	0
Source: pro-football-reference.com

== Personal life ==
Thomas' father, Joe Thomas Sr., attended his alma mater, South Carolina State University, and became the oldest player (55 years old) to play in an NCAA Division I game on November 19, 2016, when he had a carry for three yards. However, the father and son were never teammates at South Carolina State since Joe Thomas Sr. was unable to play during Thomas Jr.'s tenure from 2010 to 2013 after suffering injuries in a car accident.
