= Barnwell High School =

Coordinates: 33°13′44″N 81°21′32″W

Location
- 474 Jackson Street; Barnwell, (Barnwell County), South Carolina 29812; United States

Information
- Type: Public high school
- Principal: Franklin McCormack
- Staff: 39.50 (FTE)
- Enrollment: 562 (2023-2024)
- Student to teacher ratio: 14.23
- Colors: Red and white
- Nickname: Warhorses

Barnwell High School is a public high school in Barnwell, South Carolina. It has about 625 students. The Warhorse is the school's mascot.

The student body is more than half African American and about a third white. The entire student body was categorized as economically disadvantaged.

Prior to desegregation there was a Barnwell High School for African American students in Barnwell. It was succeeded by Butler High School.

== History ==
In 1915, a new Barnwell High School building was planned. In 1916, a photo of Barnwell High School appeared in the state school inspector's bulletin.

State law established the Barnwell High School District. In 1968, discrimination against Barnwell High School's African American students was documented. J. Chester Floyd was principal from 1969 to 1971.

From 1942 to 1965, Harold Sewell served as a teacher, school principal, and football coach. In 1967, a resolution was introduced in the South Carolina Assembly commending the school for its basketball season.

In 1998, Barnwell School District 45 trustees issued a proclamation in support of a U.S. Department of Energy plutonium disassembly plant project at a Savannah River site for the job opportunities it would offer. A 2009 book on school reform notes that Barnwell High School emphasized project based leaning in its science curriculum.

== Band ==
The school has a Scarlet Knights Band.

== Athletics ==
Barnwell High School has a football rivalry with Silver Bluff High School. Both teams have won state championships. Barnwell High School players have gone on to success in college and played professionally in the NFL. In 2008, one of the school's football players died of heat stroke after a summer practice.

The girls basketball team won a state championship in 1977. The boys basketball team won two state championships with coach Clifford "Chip" Atkins.

== Alumni ==
- R. Winston Morris
- Henry Louis Wallace
- Henry Taylor, football player
- Shelly Hammonds, football player
- Brian J. Gaines, state Comptroller General
- Marcus McKethan, football player
