= Blackville–Hilda High School =

Location
- 76 Atkins Circle; Blackville, South Carolina 29817; United States
- Coordinates: 33.364°N 81.264°W

Information
- Type: Public high school
- School district: Blackville-Hilda Public Schools
- Superintendent: David W. Corder
- CEEB code: 410190
- Principal: Cristina Snider
- Teaching staff: 15.00 (FTE)
- Enrollment: 154 (2023–2024)
- Student to teacher ratio: 10.27
- Colours: Maroon and gold
- Mascot: Hawk
- Website: https://bhhs.bcsd.net/

Blackville–Hilda High School is located in Blackville, South Carolina, United States, and is one of three public high schools in Barnwell County. It is named for Blackville and for the nearby town of Hilda, which is also serves.

== 1995 Blackville–Hilda High School shooting ==
On October 12, 1995, a school shooting occurred at the school. The gunman, 16-year-old Anthony Sincino, was a student at Blackville–Hilda High School who was suspended from school at the time of the shooting. He fatally shot one teacher and wounded another teacher before he committed suicide.

== Notable alumni ==
- Troy Brown, former National Football League (NFL) player
- Joe Thomas, NFL player
