= Henry Louis Wallace =

American serial killer and rapist (born 1965)

- Wallace Mugshot
- Born: November 4, 1965 (age 60); Barnwell, South Carolina, U.S.
- Other name: Taco Bell Strangler
- Convictions: First degree murder (9 counts); First degree rape (8 counts); Second degree rape First degree sexual offense (2 counts); Second degree sexual offense (2 counts)
- Penalty: Death

Details
- Victims: 11
- Span of crimes: March 8, 1990 – March 8, 1994
- Country: United States
- States: South Carolina; North Carolina
- Date apprehended: March 12, 1994

Henry Louis Wallace (born November 4, 1965), also known as the "Taco Bell Strangler", is an American serial killer who killed eleven women in South Carolina and North Carolina from March 1990 to March 1994. He is currently awaiting execution at Central Prison in Raleigh.

== Early life ==
Henry Louis Wallace was born in Barnwell, South Carolina, the son of Lottie Mae Wallace. Wallace grew up with his mother working long hours as a textile worker. She was verbally abusive, criticizing her son for even the smallest mistakes. He attended Barnwell High School, where he was elected to the student council and was a cheerleader. After he graduated in 1983, Wallace became a disc jockey for a Barnwell radio station.

Wallace went to several colleges before joining the U.S. Navy in 1985. That same year, he married his high school sweetheart, Maretta Brabham, in 1987. In 1988, Wallace was honorably discharged from the Navy.

== Early criminal career ==
During his time in the Navy, Wallace began using several drugs, including crack cocaine. In Washington, he was served warrants for several burglaries in and around the Seattle metro area. In January 1988, Wallace was arrested for breaking into a hardware store. That June, he pled guilty to second-degree burglary. A judge sentenced him to two years of supervised probation. According to probation officer Patrick Seaburg, Wallace did not show up for most mandatory meetings. Wallace eventually moved back to South Carolina.

== Murder victims ==
On March 8, 1990, Wallace murdered 18-year-old Tashanda Bethea, a Barnwell High School student. He then dumped her body in a lake in his hometown. Her body was not discovered for several months. Wallace was questioned by the police regarding her disappearance and death but was never formally charged with her murder. He was also questioned about the attempted rape of a 16-year-old Barnwell girl but was never charged for that. By that time, his marriage to Maretta had fallen apart. He was also fired from working as a Chemical Operator for Sandoz Chemical Co.

In February 1991, Wallace broke into Barnwell High School and the radio station where he once worked as a disc jockey. He stole valuable video and recording equipment and was caught trying to pawn it.

In November 1991, Wallace relocated to Charlotte, North Carolina. He found jobs at several fast-food restaurants in East Charlotte before becoming a manager at a Taco Bell near the now-defunct Eastland Mall.

In May 1992, Wallace picked up 33-year-old Sharon Nance, a convicted drug dealer and prostitute. Wallace beat her to death when she asked for payment for her services, then dropped her body by railroad tracks. She was found a few days later.

In June 1992, Wallace raped and strangled Caroline Love, 20, at her apartment, then dumped her body in a wooded area. Love was a friend of Wallace's current girlfriend. She was also his girlfriend's roommate and a college student. She had worked at a Bojangles at the time of the disappearance. After he killed her, Wallace, his girlfriend, and her sister filed a missing person's report at the police station. It would be almost two years (March 1994) before her body was discovered in a wooded area in Charlotte.

On February 19, 1993, Wallace strangled 20-year-old Shawna Hawk, a college student, at her home after first raping her, and later went to her funeral. Hawk had worked at Taco Bell where Wallace was her supervisor.

On June 22, Wallace raped and strangled his Taco Bell co-worker and manager, Audrey Spain, 24. Her body was found on June 25.

On August 10, 1993, Wallace raped and strangled Valencia M. Jumper, a 21-year-old college student from Columbia, South Carolina. Jumper was his sister's friend. He then set her body on fire to cover up the crime. A few days after her murder, Wallace and his sister went to Valencia's funeral, even sending her family condolences.

A month later, on September 14, 1993, Wallace went to the apartment of 20-year-old Michelle Stinson, a college student and friend of his from Taco Bell. He raped her and some time later strangled and stabbed her in front of her oldest son.

On February 4, 1994, Wallace was arrested for shoplifting, but police did not make a connection between him and the murders.

On February 20, 1994, a day after Shawna's mother appealed to the public to find her daughter's murderer, Wallace raped and strangled Vanessa Little Mack, 25, in her west Charlotte apartment. He knew her through her sister, who was a co-worker of his at Taco Bell.

On March 8, 1994, Wallace robbed, raped, and strangled 24-year-old Betty Jean Baucom a day after her birthday. Baucom and Wallace's girlfriend were co-workers at Bojangles, where she was the assistant manager. After Wallace murdered her, he took a considerable number of valuables from the house, then left the apartment with her car. He pawned everything except the car, which he left at a local shopping center.

Wallace returned to the same apartment complex on March 8, 1994, knowing that Berness Woods would be at work so he could murder Woods' girlfriend, Brandi June Henderson, an 18-year-old high school student, homemaker, and mother of Woods’ child. Wallace raped Henderson while she held her baby and then strangled her. He also tried to strangle her son, who survived.

The police increased their patrols in east Charlotte after two bodies of young black women were found at The Lake Apartments complex. Even so, Wallace sneaked in to rob and strangle Debra Ann Slaughter, 35, who had been his girlfriend's co-worker. He raped, strangled, and stabbed her 38 times in the stomach and chest before taking money from the apartment for drugs. Slaughter's body was found on March 12, 1994.

Wallace was arrested on March 13, 1994. For 12 hours, he confessed to the murders of 10 Charlotte women. He then confessed to an 11th murder he committed before moving to Charlotte. Wallace described in detail the women's appearances, as well as how he raped, robbed, and killed the women.

== Aftermath and criticism ==
Charlotte's police chief rejoiced at Wallace's arrest, reassuring the community that the women of east Charlotte were safe. However, many in the area's black community criticized the police's conduct during the investigation, accusing them of neglecting the murders of black women. One woman stated that the police did not care because they viewed the young female murder victims as "fast girls who hang out a lot". As Shawna Denise Hawk's mother, Dee Sumpter, said: "The victims weren't prominent people with socioeconomic status. They weren't special. And they were black."

Charlotte's police chief, Dennis Nowicki, had said he was unaware of a killer until early March 1994, when three young black women were murdered within four days. The Charlotte-Mecklenburg Police Department apologized to Charlotte citizens for not spotting a link between the murders sooner. However, they said the murder cases varied enough to throw them off Wallace's trail. Until Wallace's murder pace picked up in the early weeks of March 1994, the deaths were sporadic and not entirely similar. It was only during the week of March 9, 1994, that Charlotte police warned the people in east Charlotte that there was a serial killer on the loose.

== Trial ==
Over the next two years, Wallace's case was delayed over the choice of venue, DNA evidence from murdered victims, and jury selection. His trial began in September 1996. In opening arguments, prosecutor Marsha Goodnow argued for the death penalty. At the same time, defense attorney Isabel Day asked for a life sentence, arguing that Wallace suffered from mental illness, and that the killings were not first-degree murder because they did not result from "premeditation and deliberation."

According to FBI serial murder profiler Robert Ressler:

"If he elected to become a serial killer, he was going about it wrong way... Mr. Wallace always seemed to take one step forward and two steps back. He would take items and put them in the stove to destroy them by burning them and then forget to turn the stove on."

In 1994 police had asked the FBI for assistance, but the FBI said that the murders were not the work of a serial killer.

Psychologist Faye Sultan testified during the trial that Wallace had been a victim of physical and mental abuse at the hands of his mother since birth and that he had a mental illness at the time of the killings. Sultan argued for a life sentence without parole instead of the death penalty.

On January 7, 1997, Wallace was found guilty of nine murders. On January 29, he was handed nine death sentences. He was convicted of all the murders he admitted to with the exception of Bethea and Nance.

Following his sentencing, Wallace made a statement to his victims' families.

"None of these women, none of your daughters, mothers, sisters, or family members in any way deserved what they got. They did nothing to me that warranted their death."

== On death row ==
On June 5, 1998, Wallace married a former prison nurse, Rebecca Torrijas, in a ceremony next to the state's execution chamber. Mecklenburg County public defender Isabel Day served as an official witness and photographer. Also attending was the manager of the Death Row unit at the prison.

Since being sentenced to death in 1997, Wallace has appealed to overturn the death sentences, stating that his confessions were coerced and his constitutional rights were violated in the process. The North Carolina Supreme Court upheld the sentences in 2000. The U.S. Supreme Court in 2001 denied his appeal. In 2005, Superior Court Judge Charles Lamm rejected Wallace's latest appeal to overturn his convictions and death sentences.

== See also ==
- List of serial killers in the United States
- List of serial killers by number of victims
