= Banksia Hall =

Historic house in South Carolina, United States

- U.S. National Register of Historic Places
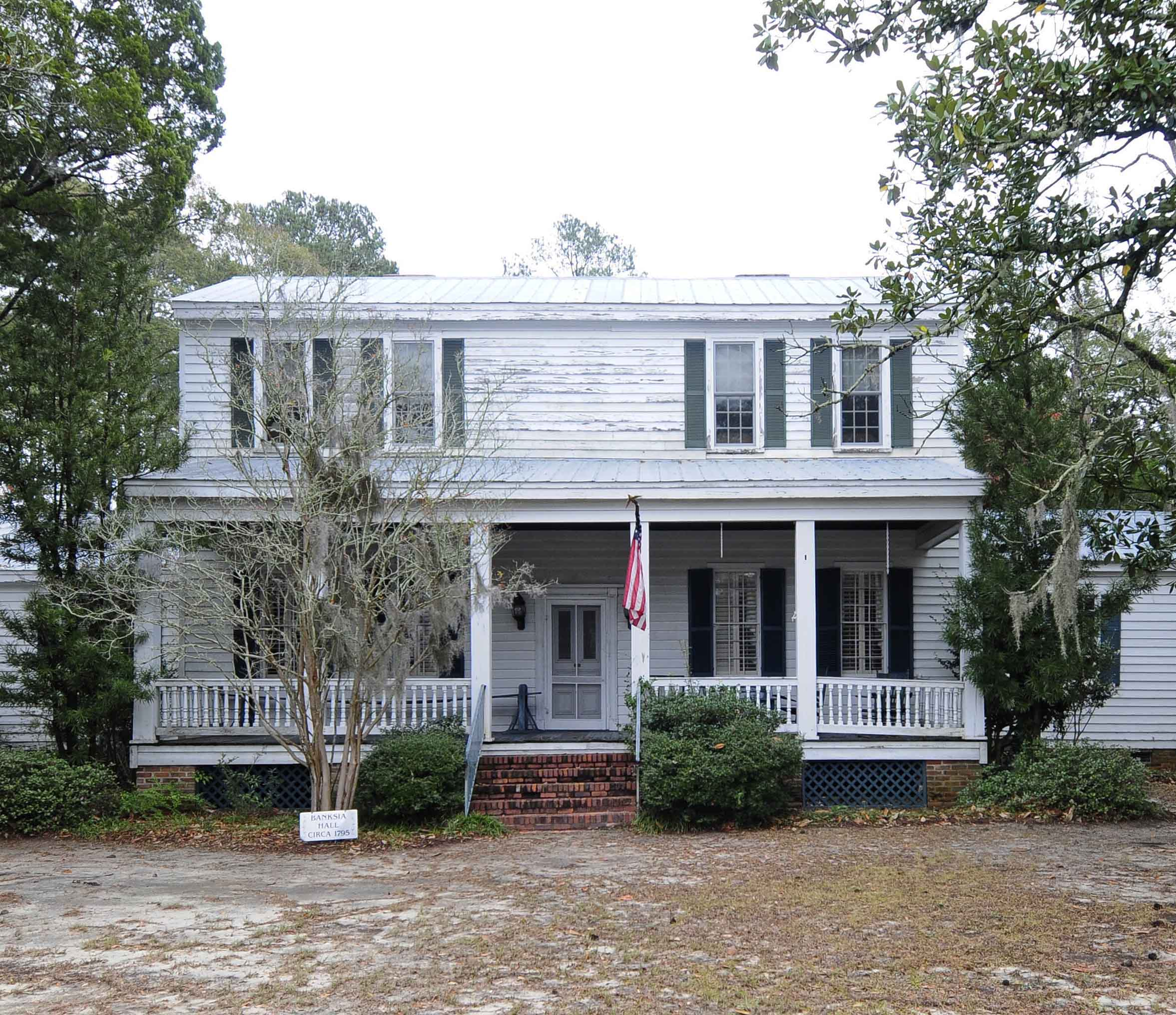

- Location within South Carolina Location within the United States
- Location: 108 Reynolds Rd., Barnwell, South Carolina
- Coordinates: 33°14′45″N 81°21′44″W
- Area: 4 acres (1.6 ha)
- Built: 1795
- Architectural style: Georgian
- NRHP reference No.: 74001821
- Added to NRHP: May 31, 1974

Banksia Hall is a private residence located in Barnwell, South Carolina. It is noteworthy because it is representative of the state's upcountry style of plantation home, circa 1780–1800. The landmark is historically significant as well. Shortly after the Civil War, federal military forces used the house to grant pardon to those who participated in the war, provided they pledged allegiance to the Union and promised to obey the laws of the United States. Banskia Hall was listed in the National Register of Historic Places on May 31, 1974.
