= Bethlehem Baptist Church (Barnwell, South Carolina) =

Historic church in South Carolina, United States

- U.S. National Register of Historic Places
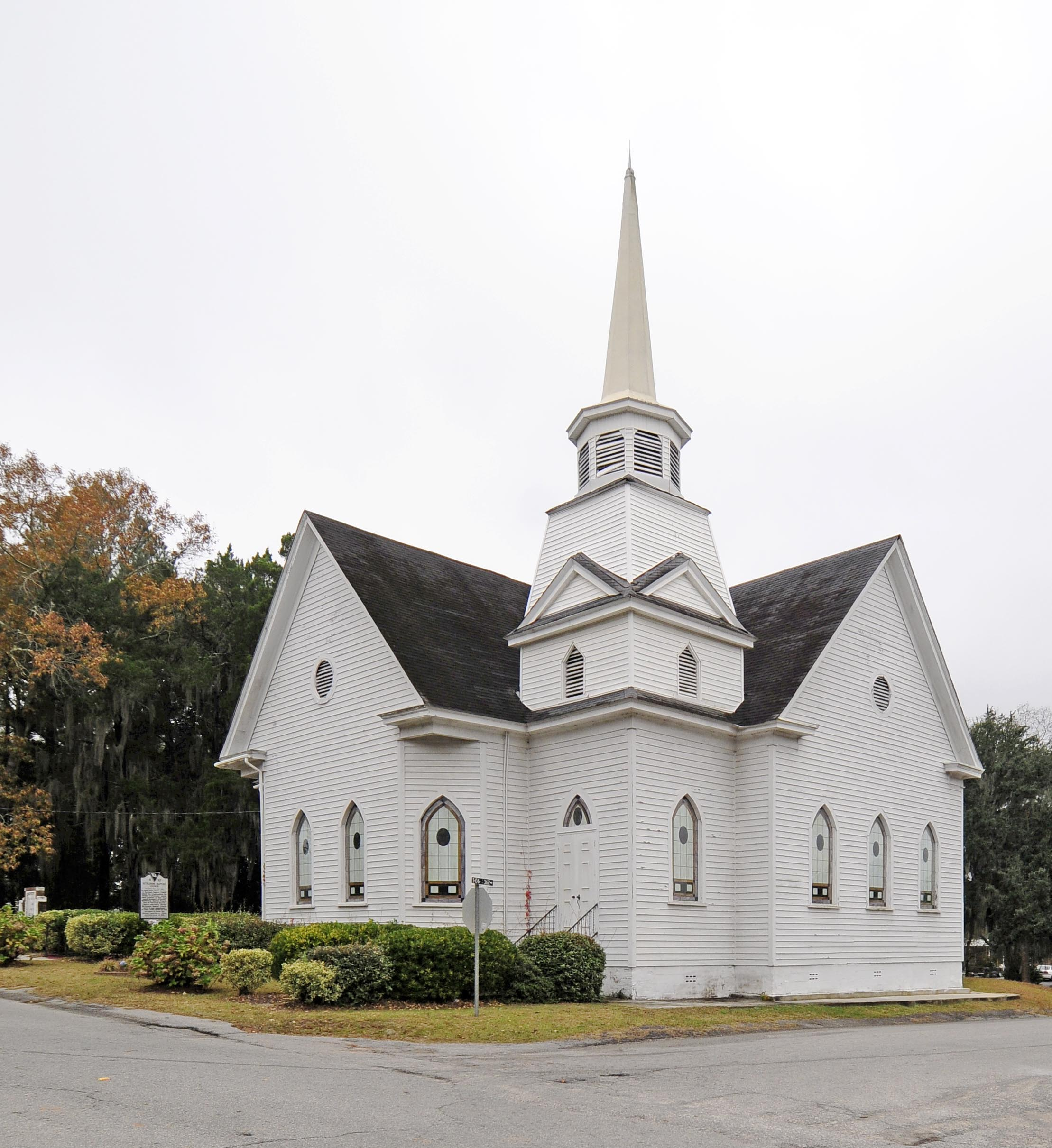

- Location within South Carolina Location within the United States
- Location: Wall and Gilmore Sts., Barnwell, South Carolina
- Coordinates: 33°14′44″N 81°21′55″W
- Area: 0.5 acres (0.20 ha)
- Built: 1898
- Architectural style: Eclectic
- NRHP reference No.: 79002374
- Added to NRHP: July 10, 1979

Bethlehem Baptist Church is a historic Baptist church at Wall and Gilmore Streets in Barnwell, South Carolina.

The Eclectic style building was constructed in 1898 and added to the National Register of Historic Places in 1979.
