= Ashley-Willis House =

Historic house in South Carolina, United States

- Ashley--Willis House
- U.S. National Register of Historic Places
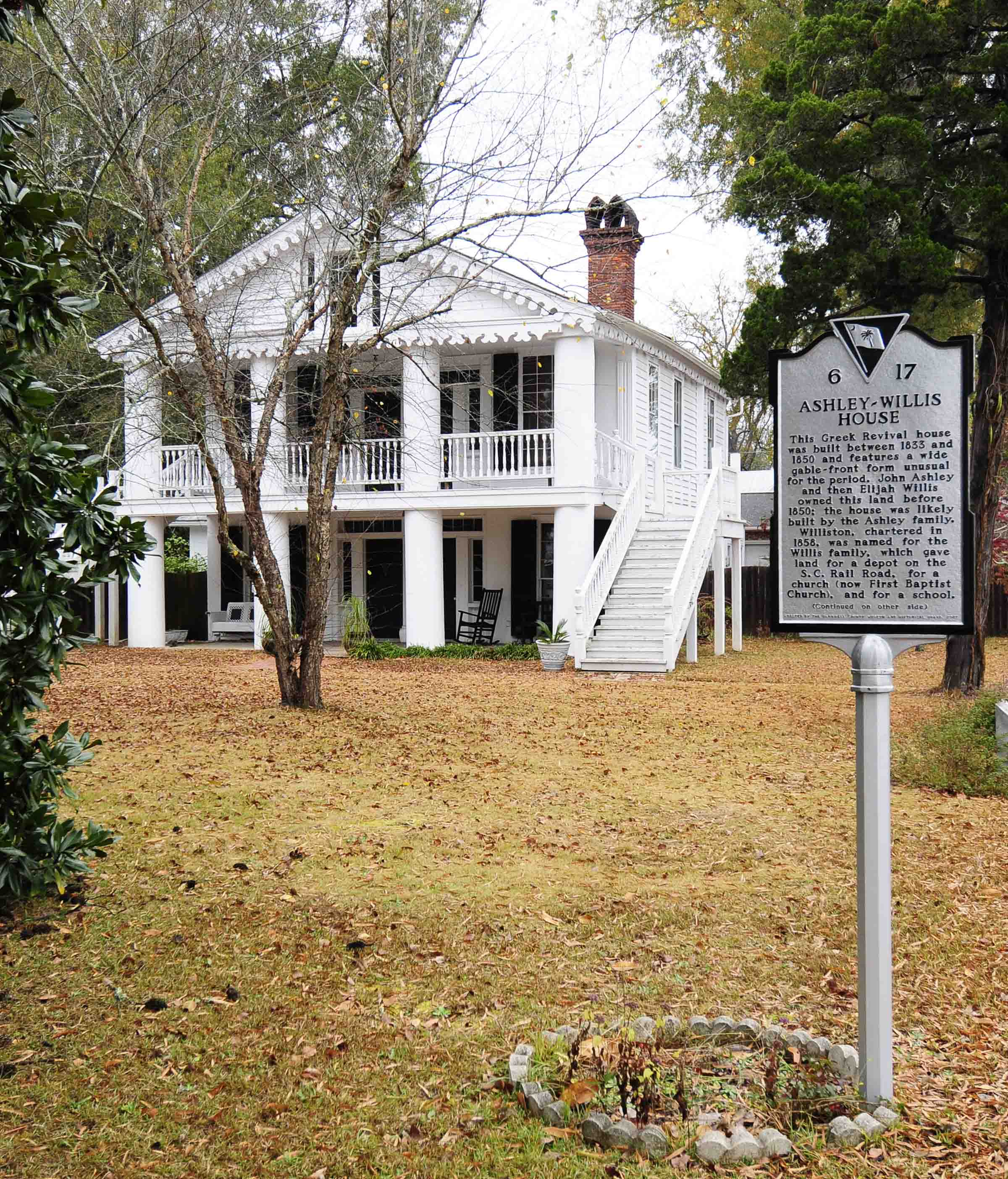

- Location within South Carolina Location within the United States
- Location: 13227 W. Main St., Williston, South Carolina
- Coordinates: 33°24′12″N 81°25′37″W
- Area: less than one acre
- Built: 1833
- Architectural style: Greek Revival
- NRHP reference No.: 04000650
- Added to NRHP: June 22, 2004

The Ashley-Willis House, located in the town of Williston, South Carolina is notable as one of the few intact, gable-front Greek Revival residences in the state. It was listed in the National Register of Historic Places on June 22, 2004.
