= Old Presbyterian Church (Barnwell, South Carolina) =

Historic church in South Carolina, United States

- U.S. National Register of Historic Places
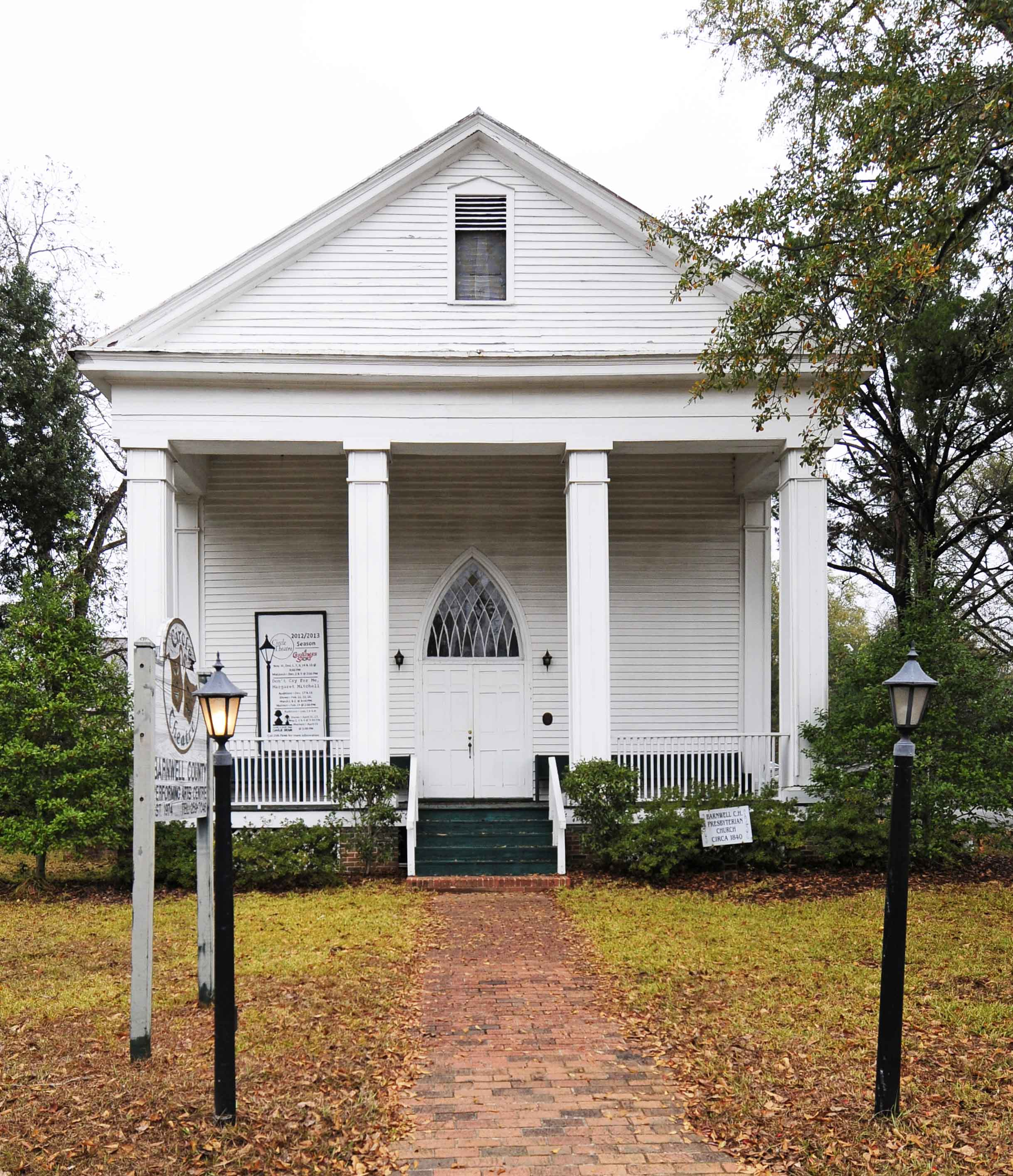

- Location within South Carolina Location within the United States
- Location: 1905 Academy St., Barnwell, South Carolina
- Coordinates: 33°14′33″N 81°21′40″W
- Area: less than one acre
- Built: 1848
- Architectural style: Greek Revival
- NRHP reference No.: 72001190
- Added to NRHP: April 13, 1972

Old Presbyterian Church (also known as First Presbyterian Church and the Barnwell Circle Theatre) is a historic church building at 1905 Academy Street in Barnwell, South Carolina.

It was built in 1848 in a Greek Revival style. The building was added to the National Register of Historic Places in 1972. The building is now home to the Circle Theater of the Barnwell County Performing Arts Center.
