= Church of the Holy Apostles (Barnwell, South Carolina) =

Historic church in South Carolina, United States

- Church of the Holy Apostles, Anglican
- U.S. National Register of Historic Places
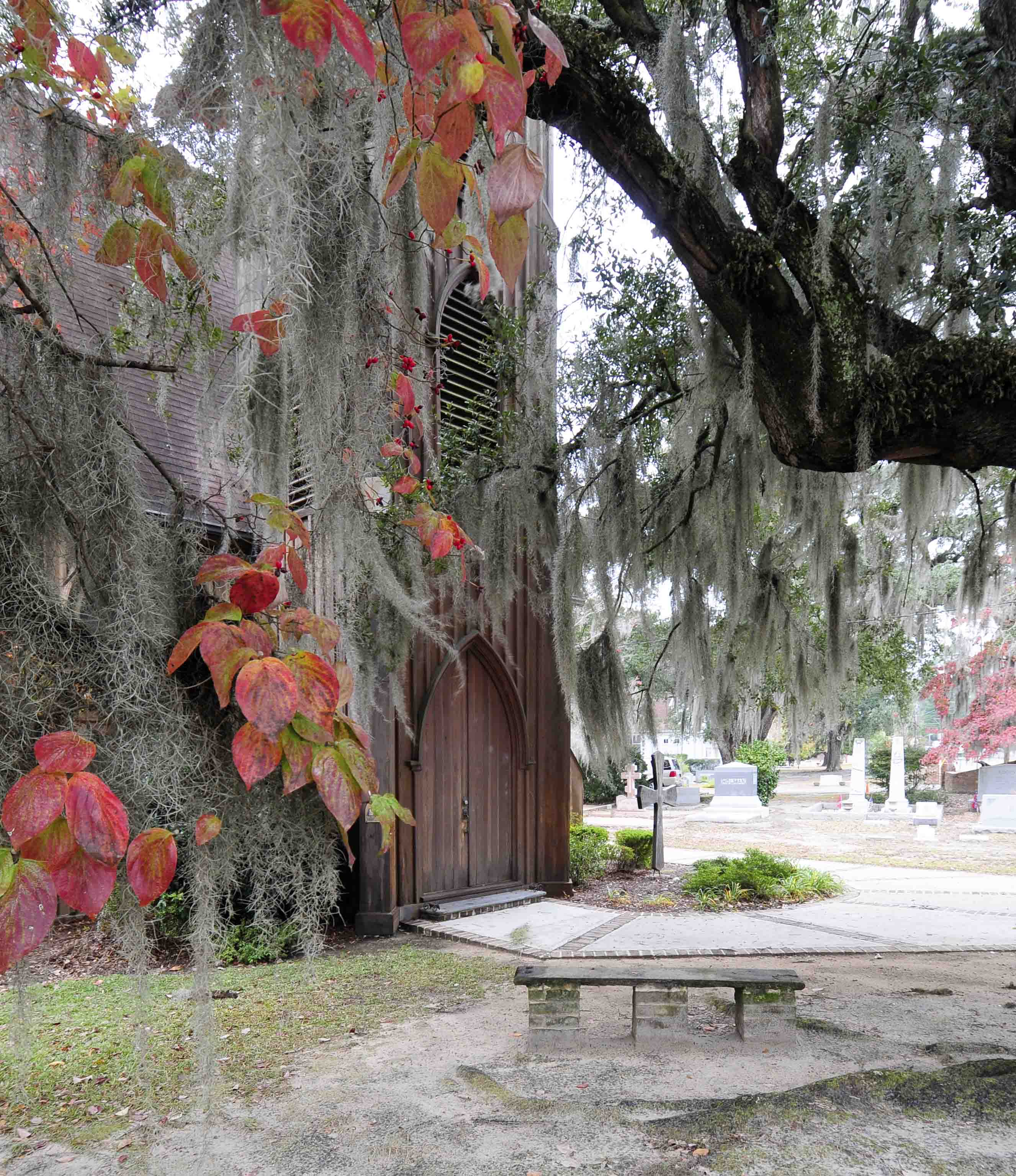

- Location within South Carolina Location within the United States
- Location: 1706 Hagood Avenue; Barnwell, South Carolina
- Coordinates: 33°14′23″N 81°21′49.01″W
- Area: 1.1 acres (0.45 ha)
- Built: 1856
- Architects: Barbot & Seyle
- Architectural style: Carpenter Gothic
- NRHP reference No.: 72001188
- Added to NRHP: April 13, 1972

The Church of the Holy Apostles is an historic Carpenter Gothic Former-Episcopal church located at 1706 Hagood Avenue in Barnwell, South Carolina. On April 13, 1972, it was added to the National Register of Historic Places as the Church of the Holy Apostles, Episcopal.

== History ==
The Church of the Holy Apostles was organized on November 18, 1848. The church was built in 1856 and dedicated on March 11, 1857, The cemetery adjacent to the church dates from the same time. Burials include Johnson Hagood, a confederate general in the Second Battle of Fort Wagner where Robert Gould Shaw was killed leading the all-black 54th Massachusetts regiment, a defeat portrayed in the 1989 film Glory.

== Current use ==
The Church of the Holy Apostles is still an active parish in the Anglican Church in North America's Diocese of South Carolina. The Rev. William "Bill" Clarkson is the current rector.

== See also ==
- List of Registered Historic Places in South Carolina
