= National Register of Historic Places listings in South Carolina =

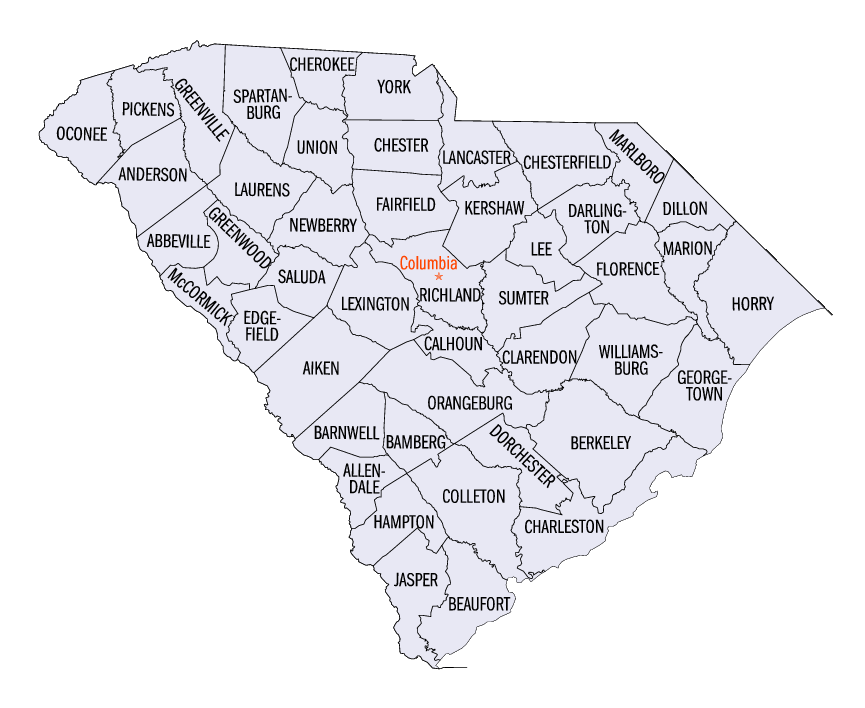
South Carolina counties (clickable map)

This is a list of the properties and historic districts in each of the 46 counties of South Carolina that are designated National Register of Historic Places.

This National Park Service list is complete through NPS recent listings posted October 2, 2026.

== Current listings by county ==
The following are approximate tallies of current listings by county. These counts are based on entries in the National Register Information Database as of April 24, 2008 and new weekly listings posted since then on the National Register of Historic Places web site. There are frequent additions to the listings and occasional delistings and the counts here are approximate and not official. Also, the counts in this table exclude boundary increase and decrease listings which only modify the area covered by an existing property or district, although carrying a separate National Register reference number.

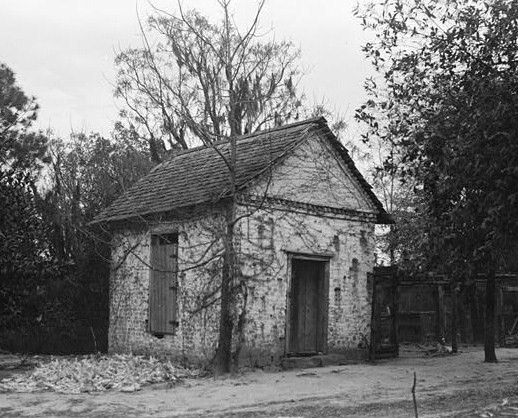
Woodlands Study, Bamberg County

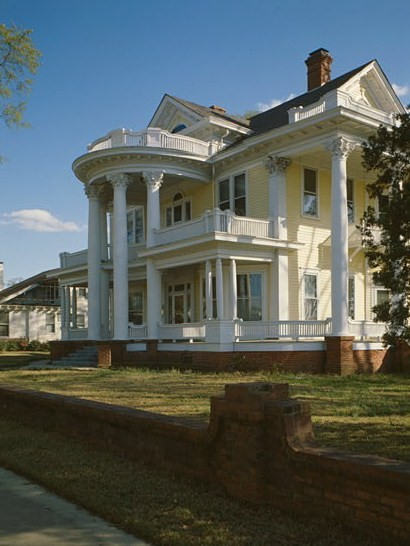
Joseph Banks House, Calhoun County

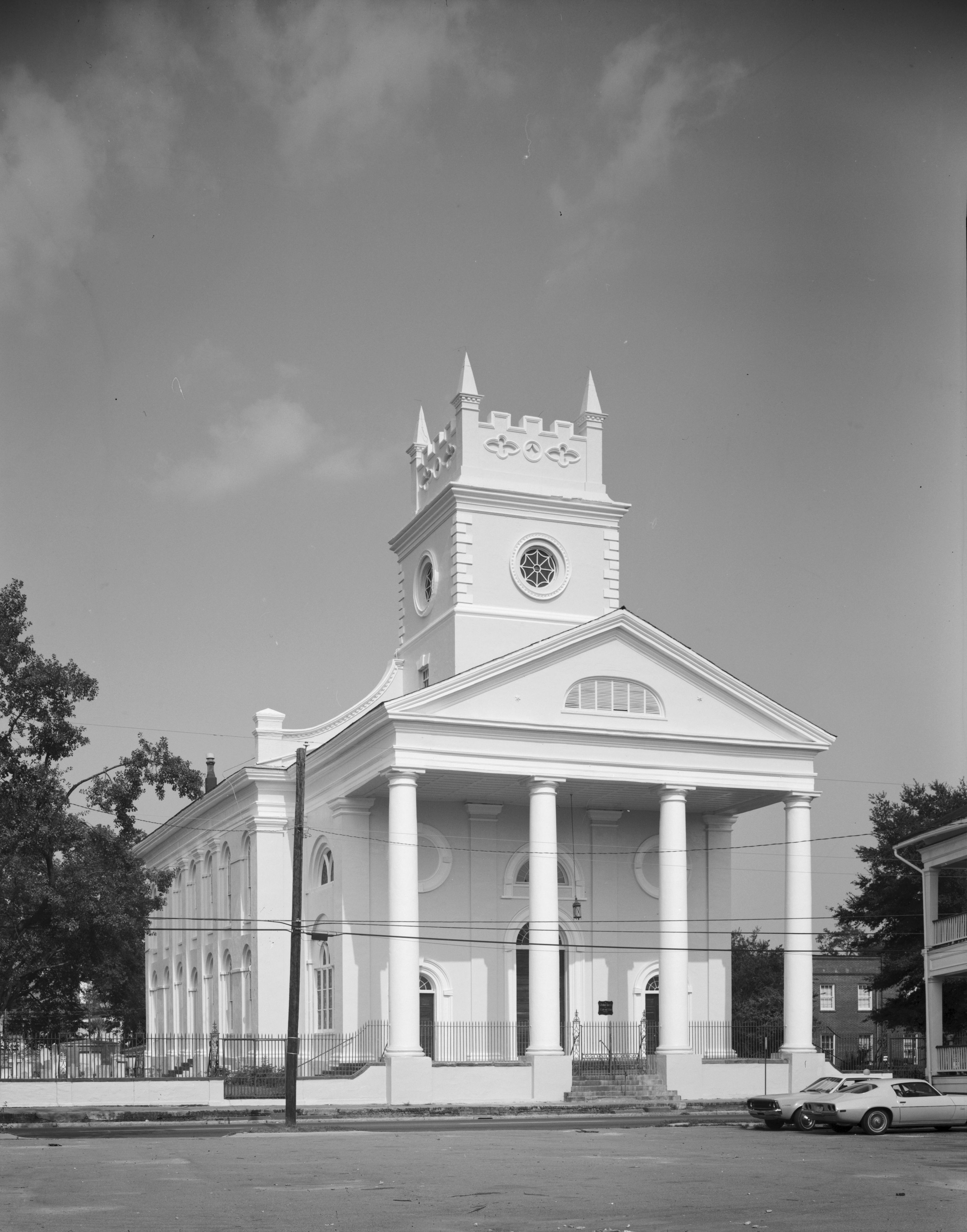
Charleston Historic District, in Charleston County

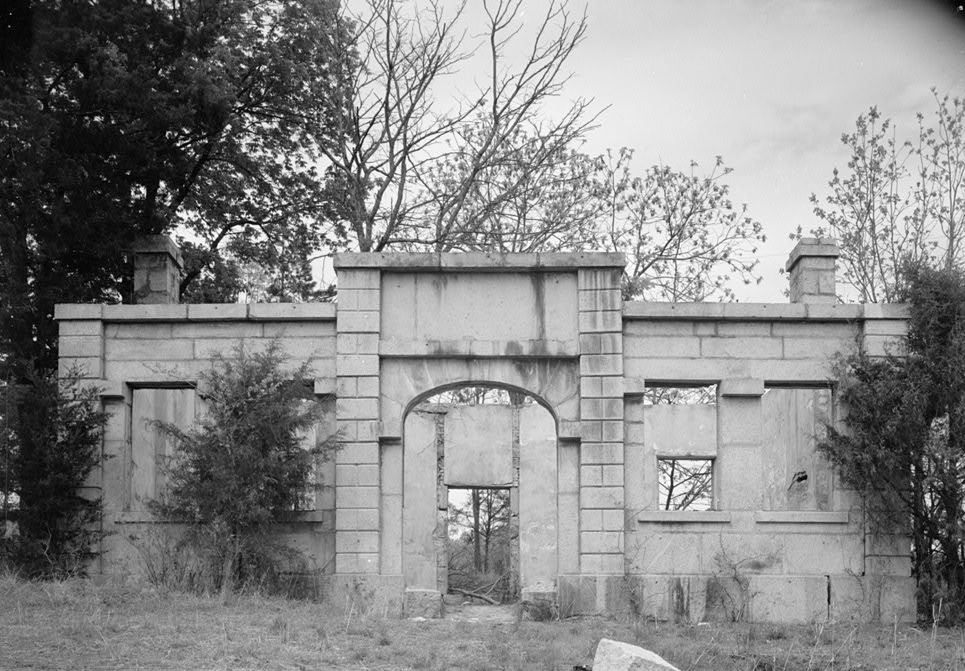
Landsford Canal Lockkeeper's House

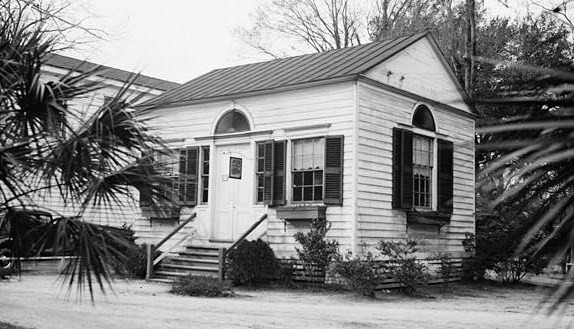
Walterboro Library in 1934

	County	# of Sites
1	Abbeville	15
2	Aiken	46
3	Allendale	14
4	Anderson	26
5	Bamberg	12
6	Barnwell	6
7	Beaufort	77
8	Berkeley	27
9	Calhoun	17
10.1	Charleston (city)	108
10.2	Charleston (other)	111
10.3	Charleston: Duplicates	(4)
10.4	Charleston: Total	214
11	Cherokee	25
12	Chester	20
13	Chesterfield	10
14	Clarendon	11
15	Colleton	12
16	Darlington	52
17	Dillon	20
18	Dorchester	13
19	Edgefield	11
20	Fairfield	44
21	Florence	29
22	Georgetown	40
23.1	Greenville (city)	48
23.2	Greenville (other)	48
23.3	Greenville: Total	96
24	Greenwood	24
25	Hampton	16
26	Horry	35
27	Jasper	10
28	Kershaw	20
29	Lancaster	29
30	Laurens	27
31	Lee	17
32	Lexington	64
33	Marion	13
34	Marlboro	10
35	McCormick	22
36	Newberry	36
37	Oconee	24
38	Orangeburg	42
39	Pickens	30
40.1	Richland (Columbia)	153
40.2	Richland (other)	39
40.3	Richland: Total	192
41	Saluda	11
42	Spartanburg	75
43	Sumter	29
44	Union	31
45	Williamsburg	12
46.1	York (Rock Hill)	28
46.2	York (other)	35
46.3	York: Total	63
(duplicates)		(6)
Total:		1,663

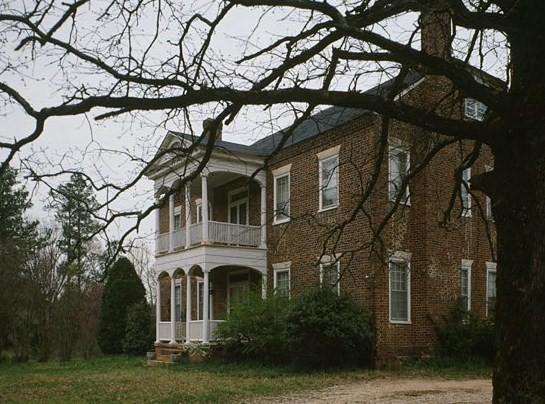
Stony Point, Greenwood County

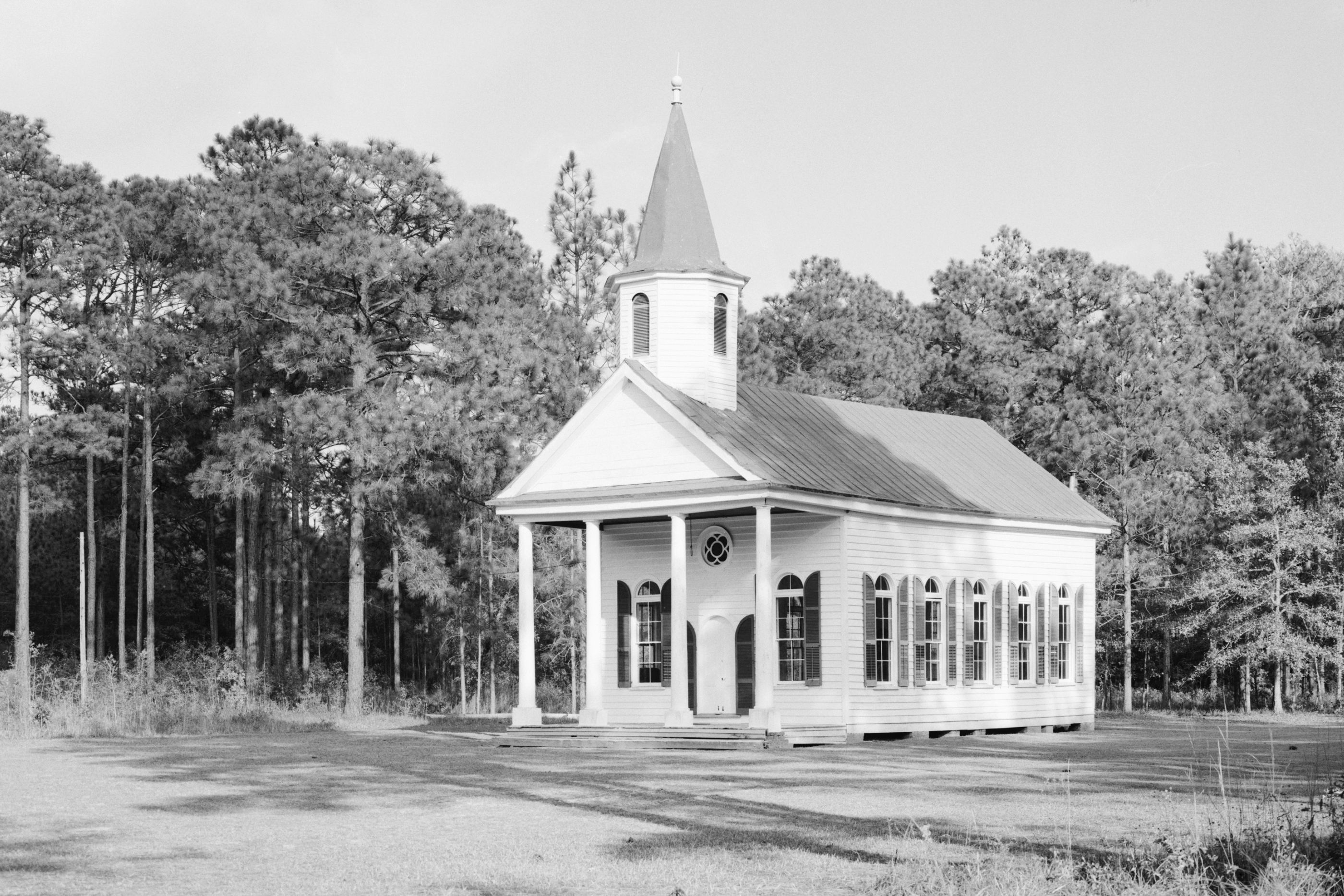
Stoney Creek Presbyterian Church, Hampton County

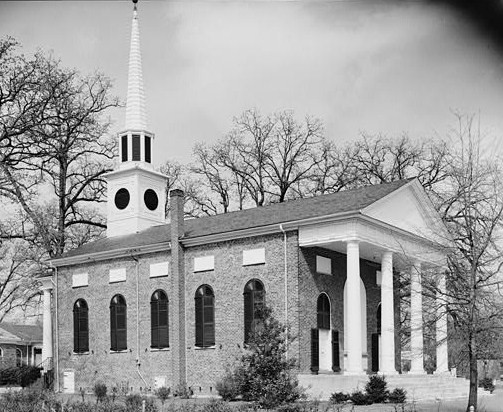
Bethesda Presbyterian Church, Camden

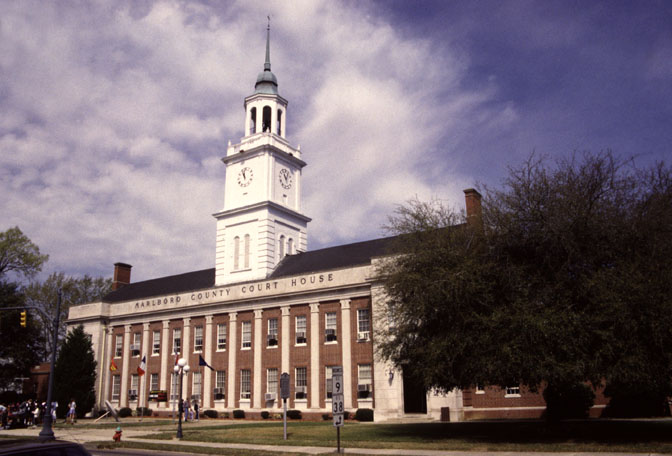
Marlboro Courthouse

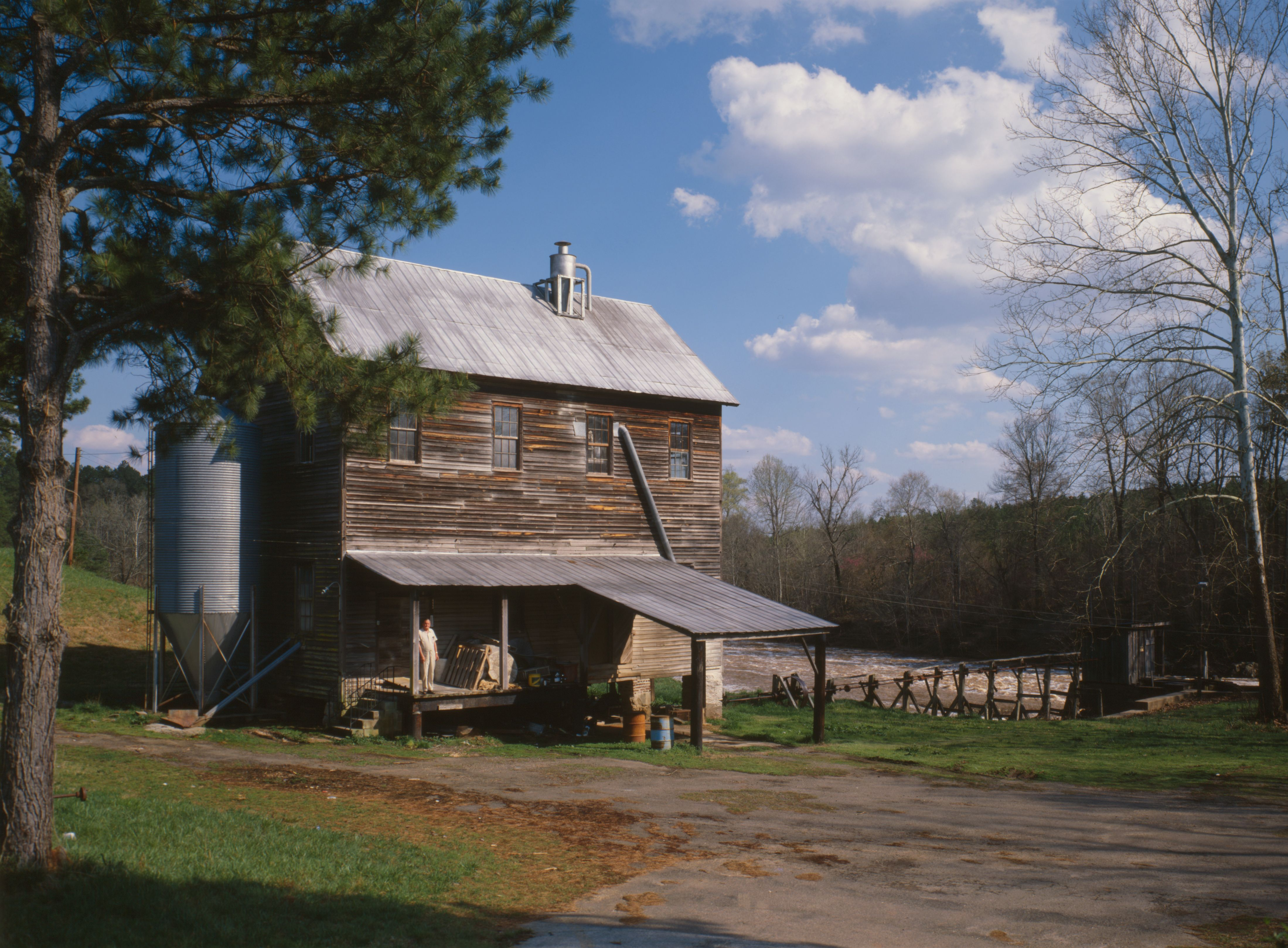
Price's or Calliham's Mill, McCormick County

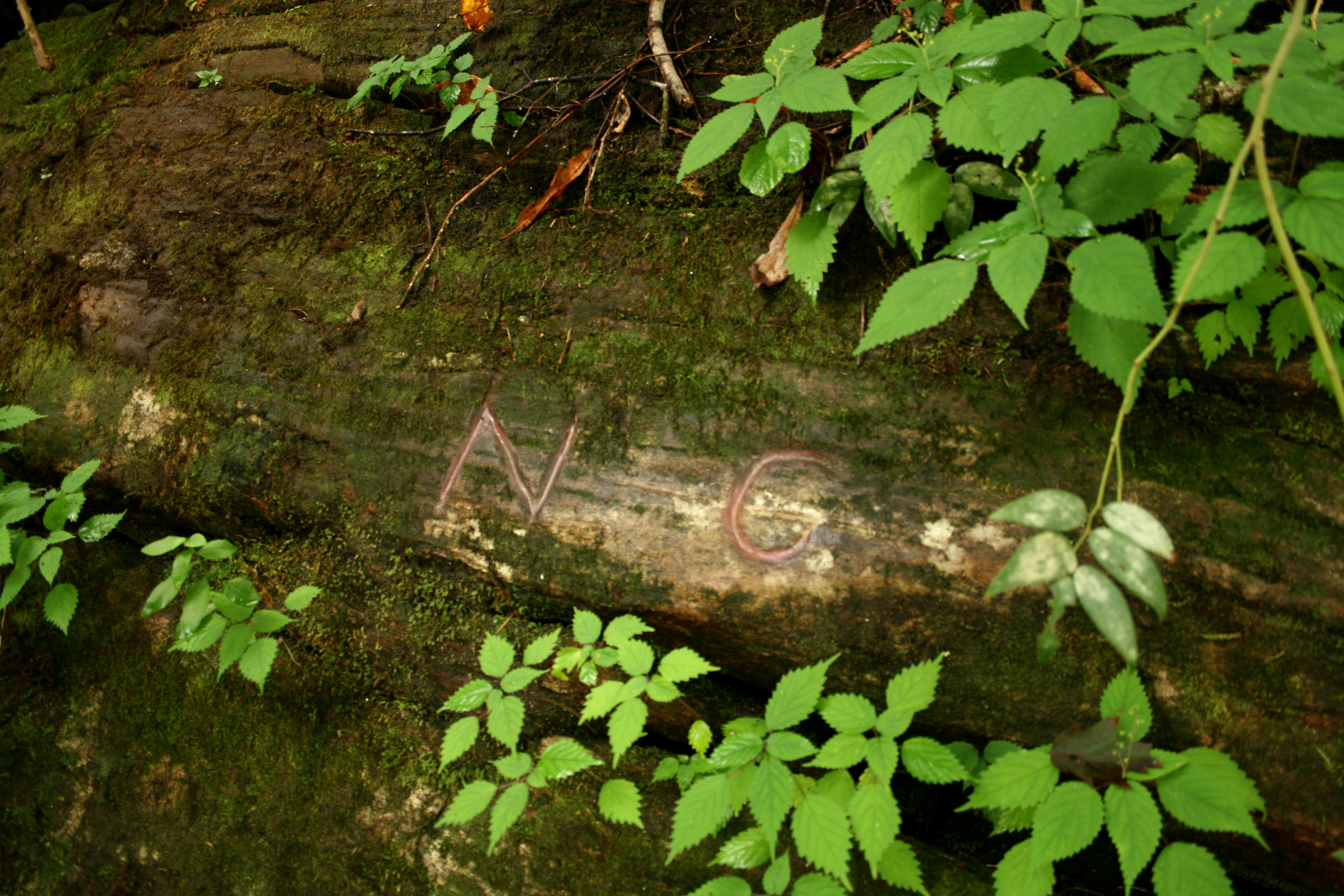
Ellicott's Rock with "NC" marked in red chalk

== See also ==
- List of National Historic Landmarks in South Carolina
- List of bridges on the National Register of Historic Places in South Carolina
- List of historical societies in South Carolina
