= Williston, South Carolina =

- Town
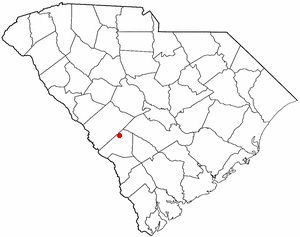
- Location of Williston, South Carolina
- Coordinates: 33°23′16″N 81°25′09″W
- Country: United States
- State: South Carolina
- County: Barnwell

Area
  - Total: 9.02 sq mi (23.35 km^{2})
  - Land: 8.95 sq mi (23.19 km^{2})
  - Water: 0.062 sq mi (0.16 km^{2})
- Elevation: 348 ft (106 m)

Population (2020)
  - Total: 2,877
  - Density: 321.4/sq mi (124.08/km^{2})
- Time zone: UTC-5 (Eastern (EST))
  - Summer (DST): UTC-4 (EDT)
- ZIP code: 29853
- Area codes: 803, 839
- FIPS code: 45-77965
- GNIS feature ID: 2406891
- Website: www.williston-sc.com

Williston is a town in Barnwell County, South Carolina, United States. The population was 3,139 at the 2010 census.

The town lies in the center of the Charleston-Hamburg railroad line, the line of the Best Friend locomotive. The train tracks were removed in the 1990s, but the track site has been designated as historically significant by the South Carolina Department of Archives. This section of the train route is now part of the South Carolina Heritage Corridor.

The small-town community once had its own newspaper, The Williston Way, founded in 1921.

== Amenities ==
Williston is home to Williston Country Club, a public golf facility located at 15 Fairway Dr. Established in 1957, it is a public 9-hole, par 36 golf course. Designed by Jimmy Tarrance, the course features 3,071 yards of golf from the longest tees and carries a slope rating of 115. The club offers challenging play for golfers at every skill level.

== History ==
The Ashley-Willis House was listed on the National Register of Historic Places in 2004.

Rosa Louise Woodberry (1869–1932) – Woodberry spent the first thirteen years of her life in Williston, South Carolina, where she received her early education. She went on to become a pioneering American journalist and educator, founding Woodberry Hall School for Girls in Atlanta in 1908, and was the first woman to attend the University of Georgia.

== Geography ==
Williston is located in northern Barnwell County. U.S. Route 78 passes through the center of the town, leading east 9 miles (14 km) to Blackville and northwest 21 miles (34 km) to Aiken.

According to the United States Census Bureau, Williston has a total area of 9.0 square miles (23.3 km^{2}), of which 9.0 square miles (23.2 km^{2}) is land and 0.08 square miles (0.2 km^{2}), or 0.70%, is water.

== Demographics ==
Historical population
Census	Pop.	Note	%±
1880	426		—
1890	503		18.1%
1900	617		22.7%
1910	624		1.1%
1920	854		36.9%
1930	1,024		19.9%
1940	1,107		8.1%
1950	896		−19.1%
1960	2,722		203.8%
1970	2,594		−4.7%
1980	3,173		22.3%
1990	3,099		−2.3%
2000	3,307		6.7%
2010	3,139		−5.1%
2020	2,877		−8.3%
U.S. Decennial Census

=== 2020 census ===
Williston racial composition
Race	Num.	Perc.
White (non-Hispanic)	1,192	41.43%
Black or African American (non-Hispanic)	1,485	51.62%
Native American	14	0.49%
Asian	8	0.28%
Pacific Islander	1	0.03%
Other/Mixed	111	3.86%
Hispanic or Latino	66	2.29%

As of the 2020 United States census, there were 2,877 people, 1,296 households, and 607 families residing in the town.

=== 2000 census ===
As of the census of 2000, there were 3,307 people, 1,310 households, and 906 families residing in the town. The population density was 371.7 inhabitants per square mile (143.5/km^{2}). There were 1,460 housing units at an average density of 164.1 per square mile (63.4/km^{2}). The racial makeup of the town was 50.80% White, 47.51% African American, 0.36% Native American, 0.09% Pacific Islander, 0.21% from other races, and 1.03% from two or more races. Hispanic or Latino people of any race were 0.82% of the population.

There were 1,310 households, out of which 33.4% had children under the age of 18 living with them, 41.1% were married couples living together, 24.3% had a female householder with no husband present, and 30.8% were non-families. 27.8% of all households were made up of individuals, and 12.3% had someone living alone who was 65 years of age or older. The average household size was 2.48 and the average family size was 3.02.

In the town, the population was spread out, with 28.0% under the age of 18, 9.1% from 18 to 24, 25.9% from 25 to 44, 21.3% from 45 to 64, and 15.6% who were 65 years of age or older. The median age was 36 years. For every 100 females, there were 86.9 males. For every 100 females age 18 and over, there were 77.3 males.

The median income for a household in the town was $26,371, and the median income for a family was $30,990. Males had a median income of $27,829 versus $21,635 for females. The per capita income for the town was $15,134. About 26.3% of families and 24.4% of the population were below the poverty line, including 31.3% of those under age 18 and 23.5% of those age 65 or over.

== Education ==
There are three schools in the town: Williston-Elko High School, Williston-Elko Middle School, and Kelly Edwards Elementary School. A private school in Blackville, Jefferson Davis Academy, also serves a portion of the town's population.

Williston has a public library, a branch of the ABBE Regional Library System.

== Notable people ==
- Rafael Bush, National Football League (NFL) safety, Buffalo Bills
- Taylor Hearn, NFL Offensive Guard, Carolina Panthers
