= Blackville, South Carolina =

- Town
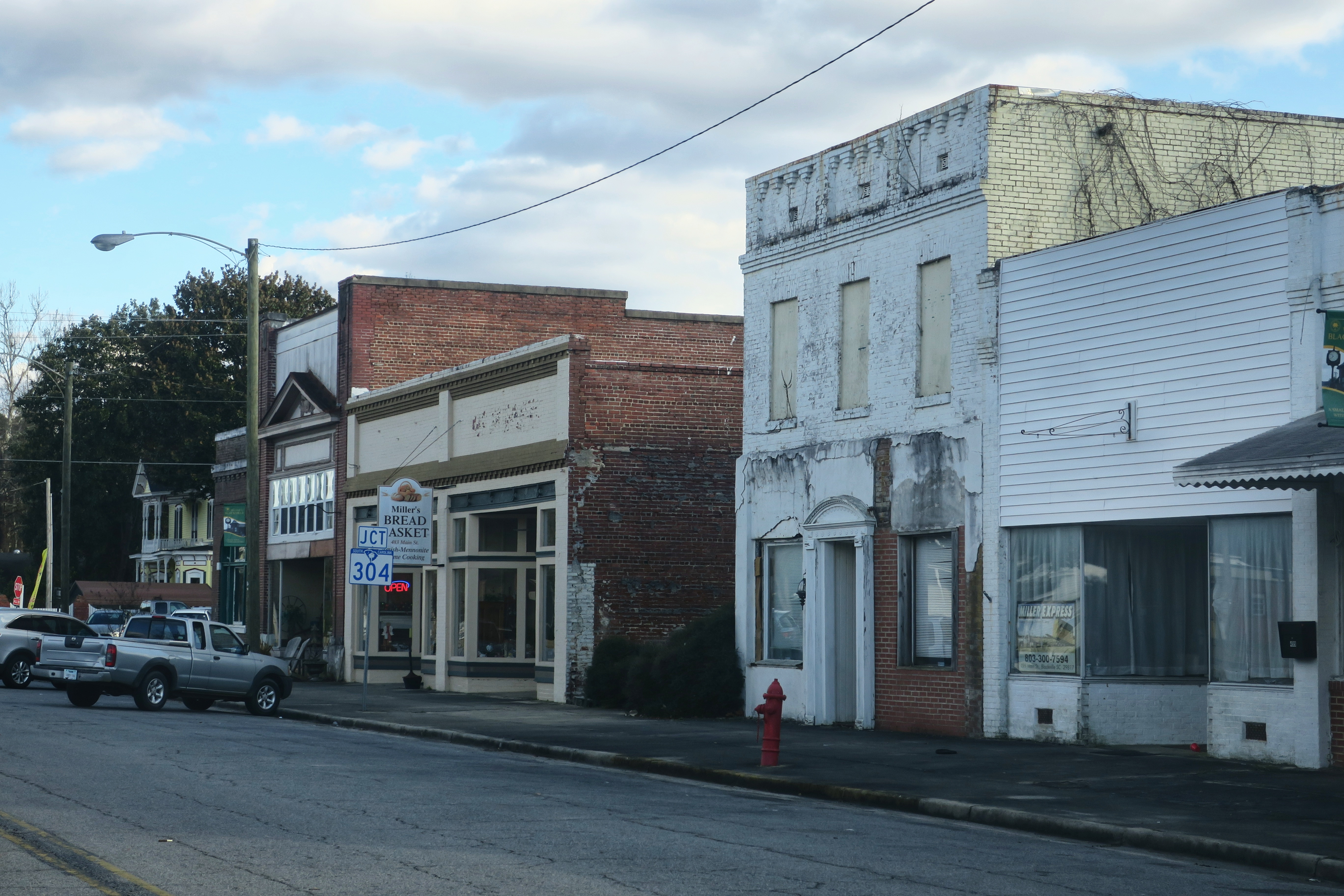
- Downtown Blackville

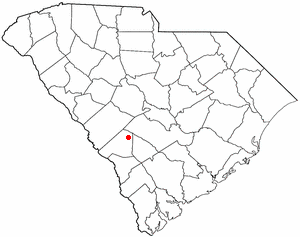
- Location of Blackville, South Carolina
- Coordinates: 33°21′25″N 81°16′22″W
- Country: United States
- State: South Carolina
- County: Barnwell

Area
  - Total: 9.03 sq mi (23.40 km^{2})
  - Land: 8.93 sq mi (23.13 km^{2})
  - Water: 0.10 sq mi (0.26 km^{2})
- Elevation: 279 ft (85 m)

Population (2020)
  - Total: 1,923
  - Density: 215.3/sq mi (83.12/km^{2})
- Time zone: UTC-5 (Eastern (EST))
  - Summer (DST): UTC-4 (EDT)
- ZIP code: 29817
- Area codes: 803, 839
- FIPS code: 45-06490
- GNIS feature ID: 2405276
- Website: www.townofblackville.com

Blackville is a small town in Barnwell County, South Carolina, United States. As of the 2020 census, Blackville had a population of 1,923.

The town was named after Alexander Black, a railroad promoter.

== History ==
On December 22, 1781, a band of British Loyalists fought with a group of local Patriots two miles north of Blackville. The location, called Windy Hill at that time, is slightly east of the present-day Healing Springs Park and Church. The commanding officer was Captain Benjamin Odom, Jr. who was a member of Colonel William Harden's regiment. Sixteen Patriots were killed. Major “Bloody Bill” Cunningham was believed to be the commander of the Tory company. The area was known for many years as "Slaughter Hill".

Longtime state representative Solomon Blatt, Sr. was born in Blackville.

== Geography ==
Blackville is located in northeastern Barnwell County. U.S. Route 78 passes through the town, leading west 31 miles (50 km) to Aiken and east 15 miles (24 km) to Bamberg. South Carolina Highway 3 leads southwest 9 miles (14 km) to Barnwell, the county seat.

According to the United States Census Bureau, Blackville has a total area of 9.0 square miles (23.4 km^{2}), of which 8.9 square miles (23.1 km^{2}) is land and 0.12 square miles (0.3 km^{2}), or 1.13%, is water.

== Demographics ==
Historical population
Census	Pop.	Note	%±
1880	684		—
1890	962		40.6%
1900	1,116		16.0%
1910	1,278		14.5%
1920	1,421		11.2%
1930	1,284		−9.6%
1940	1,456		13.4%
1950	1,294		−11.1%
1960	1,901		46.9%
1970	2,395		26.0%
1980	2,840		18.6%
1990	2,688		−5.4%
2000	2,973		10.6%
2010	2,406		−19.1%
2020	1,923		−20.1%
U.S. Decennial Census

=== 2020 census ===
Blackville racial composition
Race	Num.	Perc.
White (non-Hispanic)	250	13.0%
Black or African American (non-Hispanic)	1,583	82.32%
Native American	9	0.47%
Asian	6	0.31%
Other/Mixed	44	2.29%
Hispanic or Latino	31	1.61%

As of the 2020 United States census, there were 1,923 people, 758 households, and 432 families residing in the town.

=== 2000 census ===
As of the census of 2000, there were 2,973 people, 1,145 households, and 800 families residing in the town. The population density was 324.7 inhabitants per square mile (125.4/km^{2}). There were 1,332 housing units at an average density of 145.5 per square mile (56.2/km^{2}). The racial makeup of the town was 23.65% White, 75.61% Black, 0.07% Indian, 0.20% Asian, 0.07% Pacific Islander, 0.03% from other races, and 0.37% from two or more races. Hispanic or Latino of any race were 0.50% of the population.

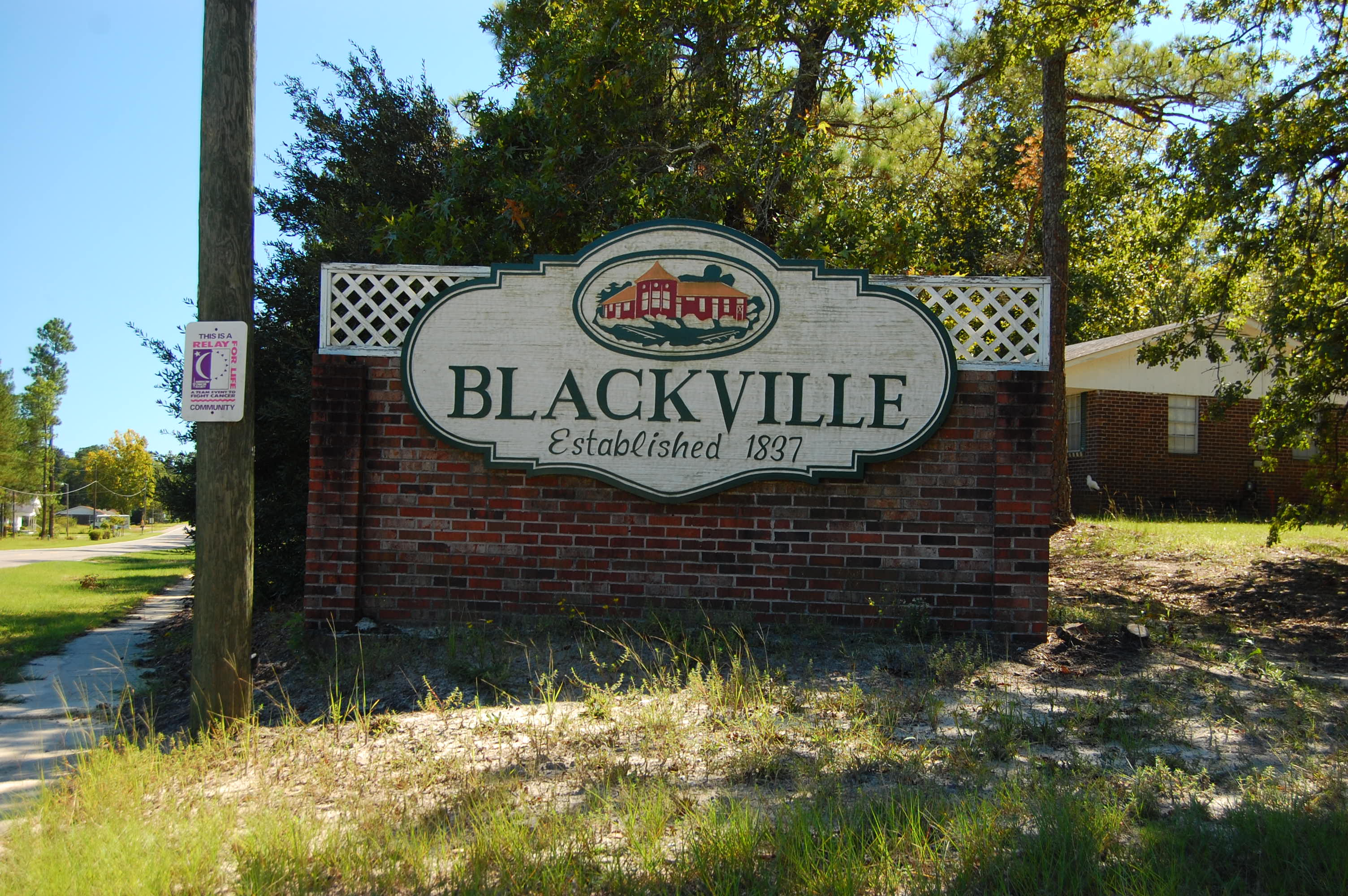

There were 1,145 households, out of which 32.2% had children under the age of 18 living with them, 35.2% were married couples living together, 29.2% had a female householder with no husband present, and 30.1% were non-families. 27.4% of all households were made up of individuals, and 10.8% had someone living alone who was 65 years of age or older. The average household size was 2.60 and the average family size was 3.16.

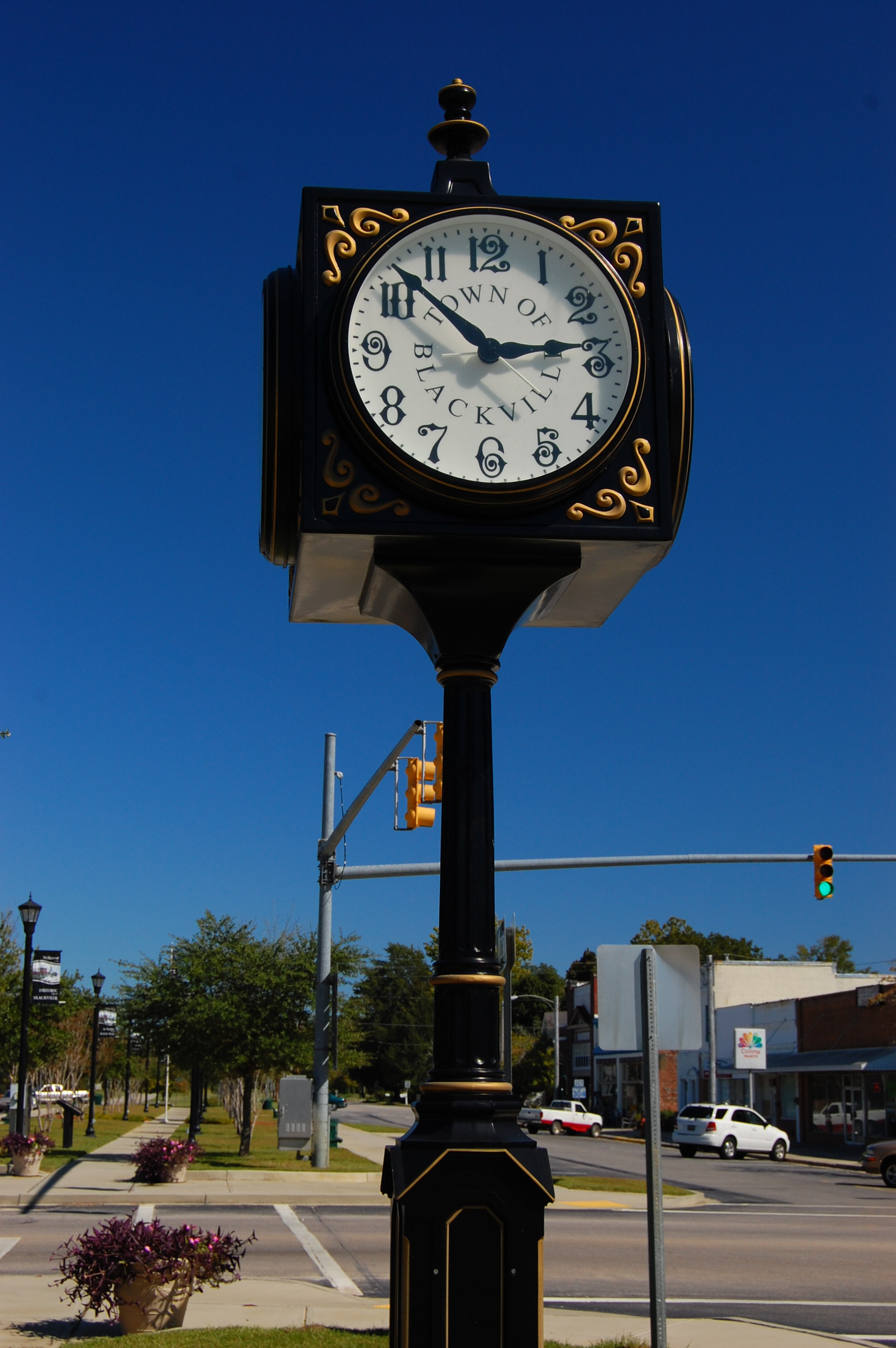
Clock in downtown Blackville, SC

In the town, the population was spread out, with 29.2% under the age of 18, 8.9% from 18 to 24, 26.6% from 25 to 44, 23.0% from 45 to 64, and 12.3% who were 65 years of age or older. The median age was 35 years. For every 100 females, there were 88.0 males. For every 100 females age 18 and over, there were 80.1 males.

The median income for a household in the town was $21,316, and the median income for a family was $28,537. Males had a median income of $25,150 versus $20,742 for females. The per capita income for the town was $11,881. About 27.0% of families and 29.9% of the population were below the poverty line, including 40.6% of those under age 18 and 28.5% of those age 65 or over.

Blackville is home to Barnwell Mennonite Church, one of the few Mennonite churches in South Carolina.

== Education ==
Education facilities in Blackville include Macedonia Elementary School, Blackville-Hilda Junior High School, Blackville-Hilda High School, Jefferson Davis Academy, Calvary Fellowship Mennonite, Bamberg/Barnwell County Adult Education, and Barnwell Christian School.

Blackville has a public library, a branch of the ABBE Regional Library System.

== Historic landmarks ==
God's Acre Healing Springs is a small patch of land whose legal owner is "God Almighty". The land includes a natural spring whose water local tradition holds has healing powers.
