= Barnwell, South Carolina =

- City
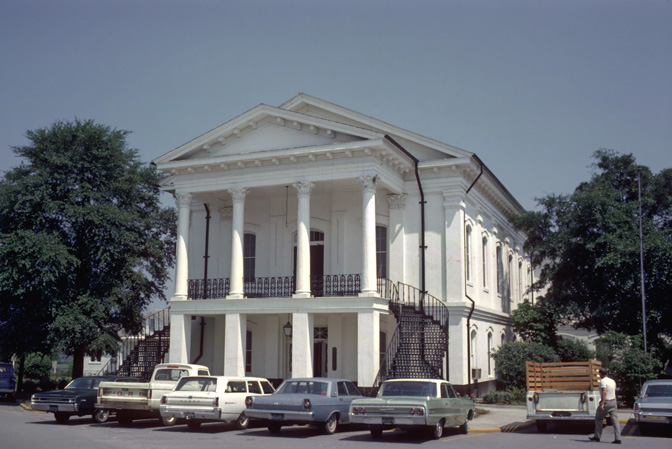
- Barnwell County Courthouse, June 1968

- Seal
- Nicknames: Gateway to the Low Country, Red Hill
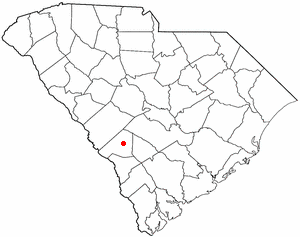
- Location of Barnwell, South Carolina
- Coordinates: 33°14′40″N 81°22′15″W
- Country: United States
- State: South Carolina
- County: Barnwell
- Town: 1829

Government
  - Type: Mayor-Council-Commission

Area
  - Total: 7.99 sq mi (20.70 km^{2})
  - Land: 7.84 sq mi (20.31 km^{2})
  - Water: 0.15 sq mi (0.38 km^{2})
- Elevation: 210 ft (64 m)

Population (2020)
  - Total: 4,652
  - Density: 593.2/sq mi (229.03/km^{2})
- Time zone: UTC-5 (Eastern (EST))
  - Summer (DST): UTC-4 (EDT)
- ZIP codes: 29812-29813
- Area codes: 803, 839
- FIPS code: 45-04060
- GNIS feature ID: 2403161
- Website: www.cityofbarnwell.com

Barnwell is a city in and county seat of Barnwell County, South Carolina, United States, located along U.S. Route 278. As of the 2020 census, Barnwell had a population of 4,652.

== Geography ==
Barnwell is located east of the center of Barnwell County. Turkey Creek, a tributary of the Salkehatchie River, runs through the city just west of the downtown, and includes a small impoundment known as Lake Brown in the north part of the city.

U.S. Route 278 passes through the city, leading south 17 miles (27 km) to Allendale and northwest 42 miles (68 km) to Augusta, Georgia. State highways 3, 70, 64 also pass through the city; SC 64 leads west 6 miles (10 km) to the east entrance of the Savannah River Site, which is a nuclear reservation.

According to the United States Census Bureau, Barnwell has a total area of 8.0 square miles (20.7 km^{2}), of which 7.8 square miles (20.3 km^{2}) is land and 0.15 square miles (0.4 km^{2}), or 1.86%, is water.

== Demographics ==
Historical population
| Census | Pop. | Note | %± |
|---|---|---|---|
| 1880 | 648 | | — |
| 1890 | 937 | | 44.6% |
| 1900 | 1,329 | | 41.8% |
| 1910 | 1,324 | | −0.4% |
| 1920 | 1,903 | | 43.7% |
| 1930 | 1,834 | | −3.6% |
| 1940 | 1,922 | | 4.8% |
| 1950 | 2,005 | | 4.3% |
| 1960 | 4,568 | | 127.8% |
| 1970 | 4,439 | | −2.8% |
| 1980 | 5,572 | | 25.5% |
| 1990 | 5,255 | | −5.7% |
| 2000 | 5,035 | | −4.2% |
| 2010 | 4,750 | | −5.7% |
| 2020 | 4,652 | | −2.1% |
U.S. Decennial Census

=== 2020 census ===
As of the 2020 census, Barnwell had a population of 4,652. The median age was 36.6 years. 24.4% of residents were under the age of 18 and 16.1% of residents were 65 years of age or older. For every 100 females there were 89.7 males, and for every 100 females age 18 and over there were 87.7 males age 18 and over.

0.0% of residents lived in urban areas, while 100.0% lived in rural areas.

There were 1,772 households in Barnwell, of which 34.2% had children under the age of 18 living in them. Of all households, 33.1% were married-couple households, 16.9% were households with a male householder and no spouse or partner present, and 44.2% were households with a female householder and no spouse or partner present. About 31.9% of all households were made up of individuals and 13.4% had someone living alone who was 65 years of age or older.

There were 2,077 housing units, of which 14.7% were vacant. The homeowner vacancy rate was 4.8% and the rental vacancy rate was 10.7%.

Racial composition as of the 2020 census
| Race | Number | Percent |
|---|---|---|
| White | 1,864 | 40.1% |
| Black or African American | 2,402 | 51.6% |
| American Indian and Alaska Native | 15 | 0.3% |
| Asian | 100 | 2.1% |
| Native Hawaiian and Other Pacific Islander | 11 | 0.2% |
| Some other race | 59 | 1.3% |
| Two or more races | 201 | 4.3% |
| Hispanic or Latino (of any race) | 97 | 2.1% |

=== 2000 census ===
As of the census of 2000, there were 5,035 people, 2,035 households, and 1,353 families residing in the city. The population density was 659.5 people per square mile (254.6 people/km^{2}). There were 2,304 housing units at an average density of 301.8 per square mile (116.5/km^{2}). The racial makeup of the city was 49.81% White, 47.37% Black, 1.05% Asian, 0.40% Native American, 0.04% Pacific Islander, 0.34% from other races, and 0.99% from two or more races. Hispanic or Latino people of any race were 0.62% of the population.

There were 2,035 households, out of which 34.3% had children under the age of 18 living with them, 40.2% were married couples living together, 22.1% had a female householder with no husband present, and 33.5% were non-families. 30.2% of all households were made up of individuals, and 12.5% had someone living alone who was 65 years of age or older. The average household size was 2.42 and the average family size was 3.01.

In the city, the population was spread out, with 28.4% under the age of 18, 8.9% from 18 to 24, 27.6% from 25 to 44, 20.3% from 45 to 64, and 14.8% who were 65 years of age or older. The median age was 35 years. For every 100 females, there were 86.8 males. For every 100 females age 18 and over, there were 79.7 males.

The median income for a household in the city was $26,722, and the median income for a family was $37,841. Males had a median income of $35,039 versus $21,912 for females. The per capita income for the city was $17,709. placing it in the top third of the state. About 20.4% of families and 22.0% of the population were below the poverty line, including 30.5% of those under age 18 and 16.7% of those age 65 or over.

== Events ==
Barnwell has a few festivals, most are to do with holidays. One of which, that is not a holiday, is The Sundial Festival. This is a two day festival at the Barnwell Circle at 218 Main Street, Barnwell, SC, United States, 29812. Originally founded by the Happy Club in 2019 and has occurred annually since. The sundial festival revolves around the fact that Barnwell has the last free standing Sundial. This festival is mostly known by the residents of the small city, and other close areas. The goal of this event is to promote local vendors, as well as create a sense of community among the small city.

== History ==
In 1785, the district of Winton County was formed from a portion of the Orangeburg District in order to create another judicial circuit. It was given its current name in 1798 when the county and its seat were named for Revolutionary War leader John Barnwell (1748–1800), who headed a militia in South Carolina. Barnwell County originally stretched from the Savannah River on the west almost to the Atlantic Ocean.

Built in 1832, the South Carolina Railroad connected Charleston to Hamburg, near Augusta, Georgia, upriver on the Savannah River. The designation of two stops on the railroad led to the development of the towns of Blackville and Williston in the mid-nineteenth century.

=== Civil War ===
Barnwell gave generously to the Confederate cause. Its most distinguished participant was Confederate General Johnson Hagood, who was later elected as governor of South Carolina, serving from 1880 until 1882.

When Union General Judson Kilpatrick was in Barnwell, as part of General Sherman's March to the Sea, his horses were stabled in the Episcopal Church of the Holy Apostles; the baptismal font in the church was used to water the horses.

=== Registered historic sites ===
Banksia Hall, Bethlehem Baptist Church, Church of the Holy Apostles Rectory, Church of the Holy Apostles, Episcopal, and Old Presbyterian Church are listed on the National Register of Historic Places.

== Education ==
Barnwell has a public library, a branch of the ABBE Regional Library System.

== Climate ==
The climate in this area is characterized by relatively high temperatures and evenly distributed precipitation throughout the year. According to the Köppen Climate Classification system, Barnwell has a Humid subtropical climate, abbreviated "Cfa" on climate maps.

Climate data for Barnwell, South Carolina
| Month | Jan | Feb | Mar | Apr | May | Jun | Jul | Aug | Sep | Oct | Nov | Dec | Year |
|---|---|---|---|---|---|---|---|---|---|---|---|---|---|
| Mean daily maximum °C (°F) | 14 (58) | 16 (60) | 19 (67) | 24 (76) | 29 (84) | 32 (90) | 33 (91) | 32 (90) | 30 (86) | 24 (76) | 19 (66) | 14 (58) | 24 (75) |
| Mean daily minimum °C (°F) | 4 (39) | 4 (40) | 8 (46) | 12 (53) | 17 (62) | 21 (69) | 22 (72) | 22 (71) | 19 (66) | 13 (55) | 7 (44) | 4 (39) | 13 (55) |
| Average precipitation mm (inches) | 94 (3.7) | 100 (4.1) | 110 (4.5) | 86 (3.4) | 81 (3.2) | 110 (4.2) | 130 (5.1) | 120 (4.7) | 89 (3.5) | 61 (2.4) | 66 (2.6) | 86 (3.4) | 1,130 (44.6) |
Source: Weatherbase

== Notable people ==
- Solomon Blatt, Jr., United States District Court judge
- Solomon Blatt, Sr., South Carolina state representative; member of the "Barnwell Ring"
- Edgar Brown, South Carolina state senator; member of the "Barnwell Ring"
- James Brown, R&B singer, songwriter, arranger, and dancer
- Troy Brown, New England Patriots wide receiver
- Brian J. Gaines, state Comptroller General
- Joseph Emile Harley, South Carolina governor; member of the "Barnwell Ring"
- Barry Miller, Texas lawyer and politician
- James T. Moore, Marine Corps lieutenant general during World War II
- R. Winston Morris, professional tuba player and teacher
- Henry Louis Wallace, serial killer

== See also ==
- List of cities in South Carolina
