= National Register of Historic Places listings in Newberry County, South Carolina =

Location of Newberry County in South Carolina

This is a list of the National Register of Historic Places listings in Newberry County, South Carolina.

This is intended to be a complete list of the properties and districts on the National Register of Historic Places in Newberry County, South Carolina, United States. The locations of National Register properties and districts for which the latitude and longitude coordinates are included below, may be seen in a map.

There are 36 properties and districts listed on the National Register in the county. Another 2 properties were once listed but have been removed.

This National Park Service list is complete through NPS recent listings posted May 1, 2026.

== Current listings ==
	Name on the Register	Image	Date listed	Location	City or town	Description
1	Jacob Bedenbaugh House	Jacob Bedenbaugh House	October 6, 2011 (#11000732)	1185 South Carolina Highway 773; 34°13′41″N 81°28′10″W	Prosperity	
2	Boundary Street-Newberry Cotton Mills Historic District	Boundary Street-Newberry Cotton Mills Historic District	November 26, 1980 (#80004465)	Roughly bounded by Drayton, Boundary, Charles, Terrant, and Crosson Sts. 34°16′13″N 81°37′31″W	Newberry	
3	Burton House	Burton House	November 26, 1980 (#80003681)	1315 Glenn St. 34°16′53″N 81°36′44″W	Newberry	
4	Caldwell Street Historic District	Caldwell Street Historic District	November 26, 1980 (#80004464)	Caldwell St. 34°16′17″N 81°37′02″W	Newberry	
5	Coateswood	Coateswood	April 28, 1975 (#75001704)	1700 Boundary St. 34°16′28″N 81°36′52″W	Newberry	
6	College Street Historic District	College Street Historic District	November 26, 1980 (#80004461)	College St. 34°16′49″N 81°37′17″W	Newberry	
7	Cousins House	Cousins House	November 26, 1980 (#80004473)	Nance St. Extension; 34°15′40″N 81°36′37″W	Newberry	
8	Folk-Holloway House	Folk-Holloway House	July 30, 1992 (#92000963)	Junction of Holloway (Columbia Highway or County Road 107) and Folk Sts. 34°16′04″N 81°25′12″W	Pomaria	
9	Gallman High School		May 28, 2025 (#100011925)	540 Brantley St. 34°15′56″N 81°37′19″W	Newberry	
10	Hannah Rosenwald School	Hannah Rosenwald School	January 22, 2009 (#08001369)	61 Deadfall Rd. 34°10′51″N 81°38′00″W	Newberry	"Three-teacher" Rosenwald school erected in 1925 and affiliated with the Hannah A.M.E. Church
11	Harrington Street Historic District	Harrington Street Historic District	November 26, 1980 (#80004462)	Harrington St. 34°16′53″N 81°36′56″W	Newberry	
12	Hatton House	Hatton House	October 1, 1990 (#90001504)	Holloway St. between Folk St. and U.S. Route 176; 34°16′11″N 81°25′20″W	Pomaria	
13	Francis B. Higgins House	Francis B. Higgins House	November 26, 1980 (#80003682)	1520 Boundary St. 34°16′24″N 81°36′57″W	Newberry	
14	Hope Rosenwald School	Hope Rosenwald School	October 3, 2007 (#07001045)	1971 Hope Station Rd. 34°16′12″N 81°21′53″W	Pomaria	
15	Howard Junior High School	Howard Junior High School	February 3, 2006 (#05001577)	431 Shiloh St. 34°12′57″N 81°32′33″W	Prosperity	
16	Little Mountain Historic District	Little Mountain Historic District	April 18, 2003 (#03000275)	Along portions of Pomaria, Church, Main, and Mountain Sts. 34°11′49″N 81°24′49″W	Little Mountain	
17	Main Street Historic District	Main Street Historic District	November 26, 1980 (#80004463)	Roughly bounded by Harper, Summer, Douglas, Johnstone, Holman, and McMorris Sts. 34°16′47″N 81°36′40″W	Newberry	
18	Moon-Dominick House	Moon-Dominick House	March 22, 1982 (#82003896)	Northeast of Chappells; 34°13′20″N 81°50′42″W	Chappells	
19	George Mower House	George Mower House	November 26, 1980 (#80003683)	1526 Boundary St. 34°16′25″N 81°35′38″W	Newberry	
20	Frederick Nance House	Frederick Nance House	July 27, 2014 (#13000333)	921 Jessica Ave. 34°16′03″N 81°37′28″W	Newberry	
21	Newberry College Historic District	Newberry College Historic District	June 23, 1976 (#76001706)	2100 College St. 34°17′06″N 81°37′18″W	Newberry	
22	Newberry County Memorial Hospital	Newberry County Memorial Hospital	April 21, 2004 (#04000355)	1300-1308 Hunt St. 34°17′02″N 81°36′23″W	Newberry	
23	Newberry Historic District	Newberry Historic District	December 31, 1974 (#74001870)	Bounded roughly by Friend, College, McKibben, and Harrington Sts.; also roughly bounded by Friend, McKibben, Harrington, Lindsay, and Coates Sts.; also along sections of Main, Lindsay and Wilson Sts. 34°16′27″N 81°37′28″W	Newberry	Second and third sets of boundaries represent boundary increases of November 26, 1980 and June 16, 2004
24	Newberry Opera House	Newberry Opera House	December 3, 1969 (#69000171)	Boyce and Nance Sts. 34°16′28″N 81°37′15″W	Newberry	
25	Oakland Mill	Oakland Mill	June 15, 2011 (#11000372)	2802 Fair Ave. 34°17′38″N 81°37′40″W	Newberry	Textile mill with initial construction in 1910-12; also known as Oakland-Kendall Mill
26	Old Courthouse	Old Courthouse	August 19, 1971 (#71000791)	1207 Caldwell St. 34°16′31″N 81°37′16″W	Newberry	
27	Pomaria	Pomaria	April 24, 1979 (#79003321)	Southeast of Pomaria on U.S. Route 176; 34°15′15″N 81°23′08″W	Pomaria	
28	Prosperity Cemetery	Prosperity Cemetery	January 15, 2014 (#13001097)	531 McNeary St. 34°11′54″N 81°31′48″W	Prosperity	
29	Ike Reighley House	Ike Reighley House	November 26, 1980 (#80003684)	2304 Main St. 34°16′45″N 81°36′23″W	Newberry	
30	St. John's Lutheran Church	St. John's Lutheran Church	December 8, 1978 (#78002527)	Southeast of Pomaria; 34°15′11″N 81°22′18″W	Pomaria	
31	Summer Brothers Stores	Summer Brothers Stores	November 26, 1980 (#80003686)	900 Main St. 34°16′23″N 81°37′20″W	Newberry	
32	Timberhouse	Timberhouse	November 26, 1980 (#80003687)	1427 Ebenezer Rd. 34°15′36″N 81°36′15″W	Newberry	
33	Vincent Street Historic District	Vincent Street Historic District	November 26, 1980 (#80003688)	Vincent and Crosson Sts. 34°16′32″N 81°37′39″W	Newberry	
34	Wells Japanese Garden	Wells Japanese Garden	November 26, 1980 (#80003689)	Lindsay St. 34°16′42″N 81°37′11″W	Newberry	
35	Osborne Wells House	Osborne Wells House	November 26, 1980 (#80003690)	1101 Fair St. 34°16′57″N 81°37′37″W	Newberry	
36	West Boundary Street Historic District	West Boundary Street Historic District	November 26, 1980 (#80003691)	Boundary and Jessica Sts. 34°16′00″N 81°37′29″W	Newberry	

== Former listings ==
	Name on the Register	Image	Date listed	Date removed	Location	City or town	Description
1	Oakhurst		April 24, 1979 (#79002389)	December 8, 2005		Newberry	Also known as the Matthews House. Demolished on November 15, 2002.
2	Stewart House		November 26, 1980 (#80003685)	March 15, 2005	1001 Wilson Street	Newberry	Delisted after being relocated

== See also ==
- List of National Historic Landmarks in South Carolina
- National Register of Historic Places listings in South Carolina
