= Newberry Historic District =

Newberry Historic District may refer to:

- Newberry Historic District (Newberry, Florida), listed on the NRHP in Florida
- Newberry Historic District (Newberry, South Carolina), listed on the NRHP in South Carolina

== See also ==
- Boundary Street-Newberry Cotton Mills Historic District, Newberry, South Carolina
- Newberry College Historic District, Newberry, South Carolina
- Newberry Boulevard Historic District, Milwaukee, Wisconsin, listed on the NRHP in Wisconsin
