= Frederick Nance House =

Historic house in South Carolina, United States

- U.S. National Register of Historic Places
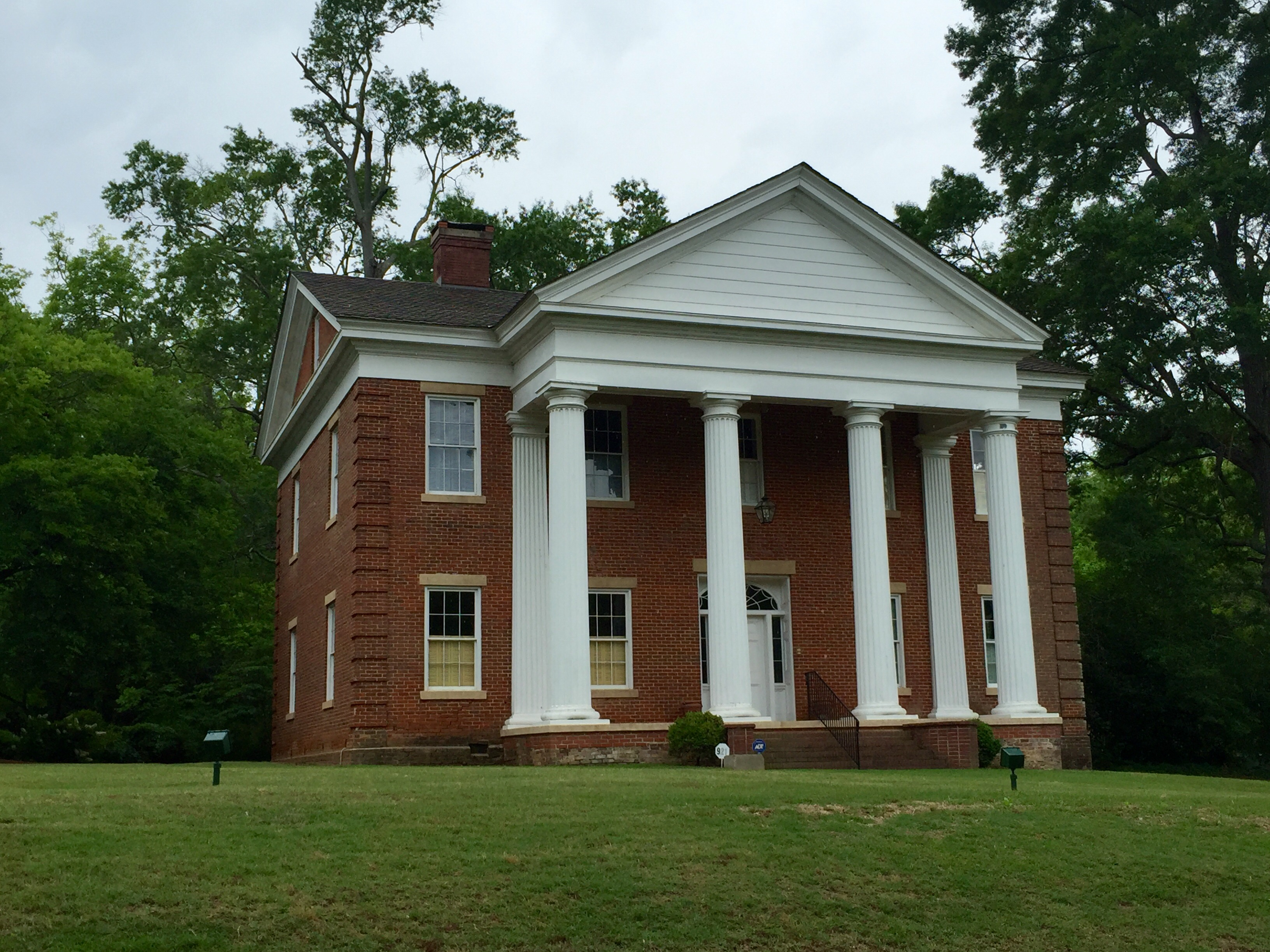

- Location within South Carolina Location within the United States
- Location: 921 Jessica Ave., Newberry, South Carolina
- Coordinates: 34°16′3″N 81°37′28″W
- Built: 1822
- NRHP reference No.: 13000333
- Added to NRHP: July 27, 2014

The Frederick Nance House, also known as Oak Grove, is a historic house at 921 Jessica Avenue in Newberry, South Carolina. The brick plantation house was built c. 1822–25 on land owned by Frederick Nance, a prominent local politician, who had served as Lieutenant Governor of South Carolina 1808–10. The house is a virtually intact example of antebellum plantation architecture, and is accompanied by a somewhat rare local example of a surviving slave quarters. The house's design has been attributed to Robert Mills.

The property was listed on the National Register of Historic Places in 2014.

== See also ==
- National Register of Historic Places listings in Newberry County, South Carolina
