= Oakland Mill =

- U.S. National Register of Historic Places
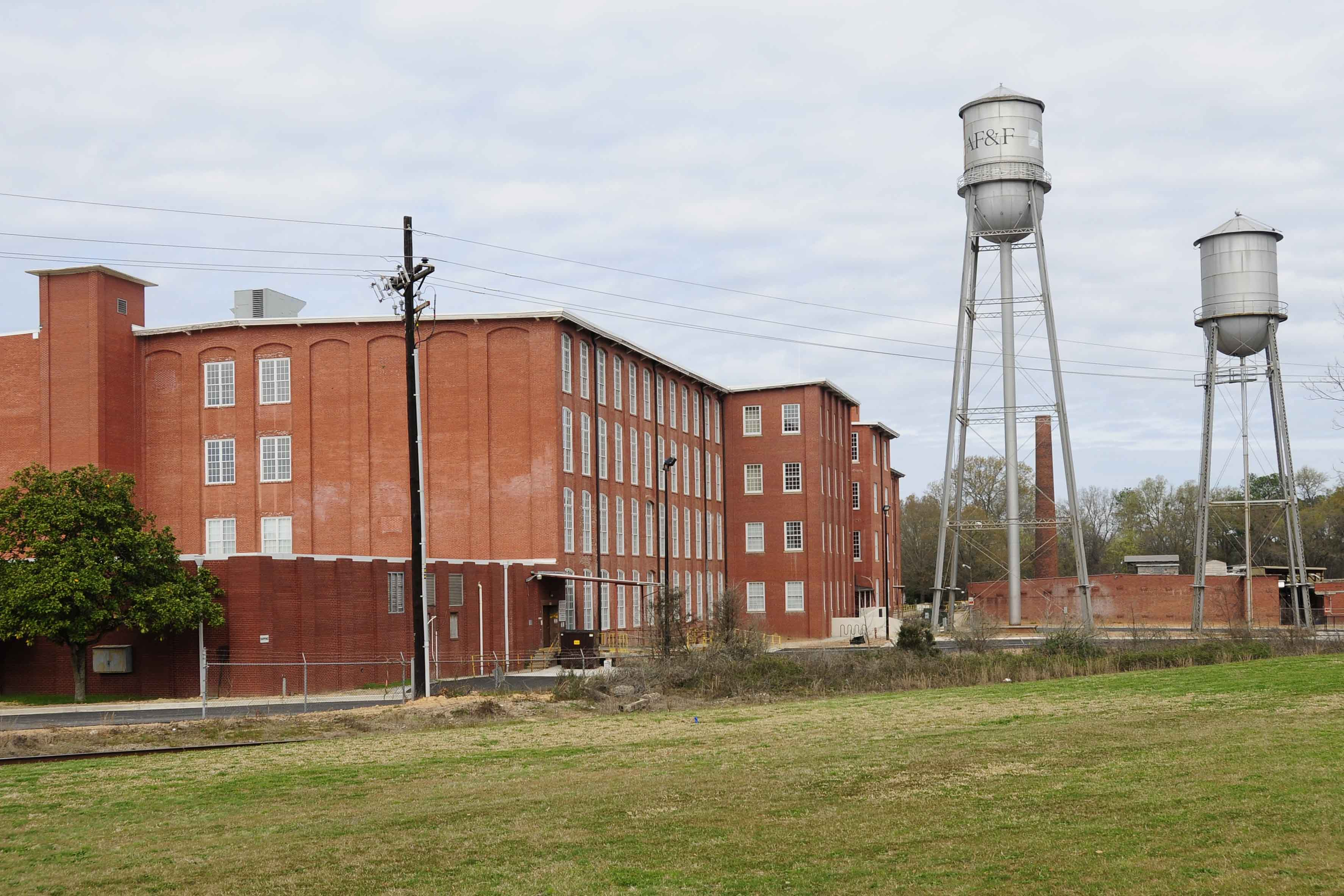
- Oakland Mill, March 2012

- Location within South Carolina Location within the United States
- Location: 2802 Fair Ave., Newberry, South Carolina
- Coordinates: 34°17′38″N 81°37′40″W
- Area: 16.52 acres (6.69 ha)
- Built: c. 1910-1912, 1949-1950, 1950-1951
- Architectural style: Romanesque Revival
- NRHP reference No.: 11000372
- Added to NRHP: June 15, 2011

Oakland Mill, also known as Oakland-Kendall Mill, is a historic textile mill complex located at Newberry, Newberry County, South Carolina in the United States. The original section was built between 1910 and 1912, with building expansion campaigns conducted from 1949 to 1950 and from 1950 to 1951. The original section reflects Romanesque Revival style design influences. The complex includes the main mill building, a one-story brick office building, a two-story brick boiler house with a brick smokestack and auxiliary building, two masonry and concrete warehouses, two wood-frame auxiliary storage buildings, a railroad spur, two water towers, and a reservoir. The mill remained in operation until the 2000s.

It was listed on the National Register of Historic Places in 2011.

It has been renovated and is now being used as apartment buildings; one building is open to the general public while the other is reserved for students of the nearby Newberry College.
