= Ike Reighley House =

Historic house in South Carolina, United States

- U.S. National Register of Historic Places
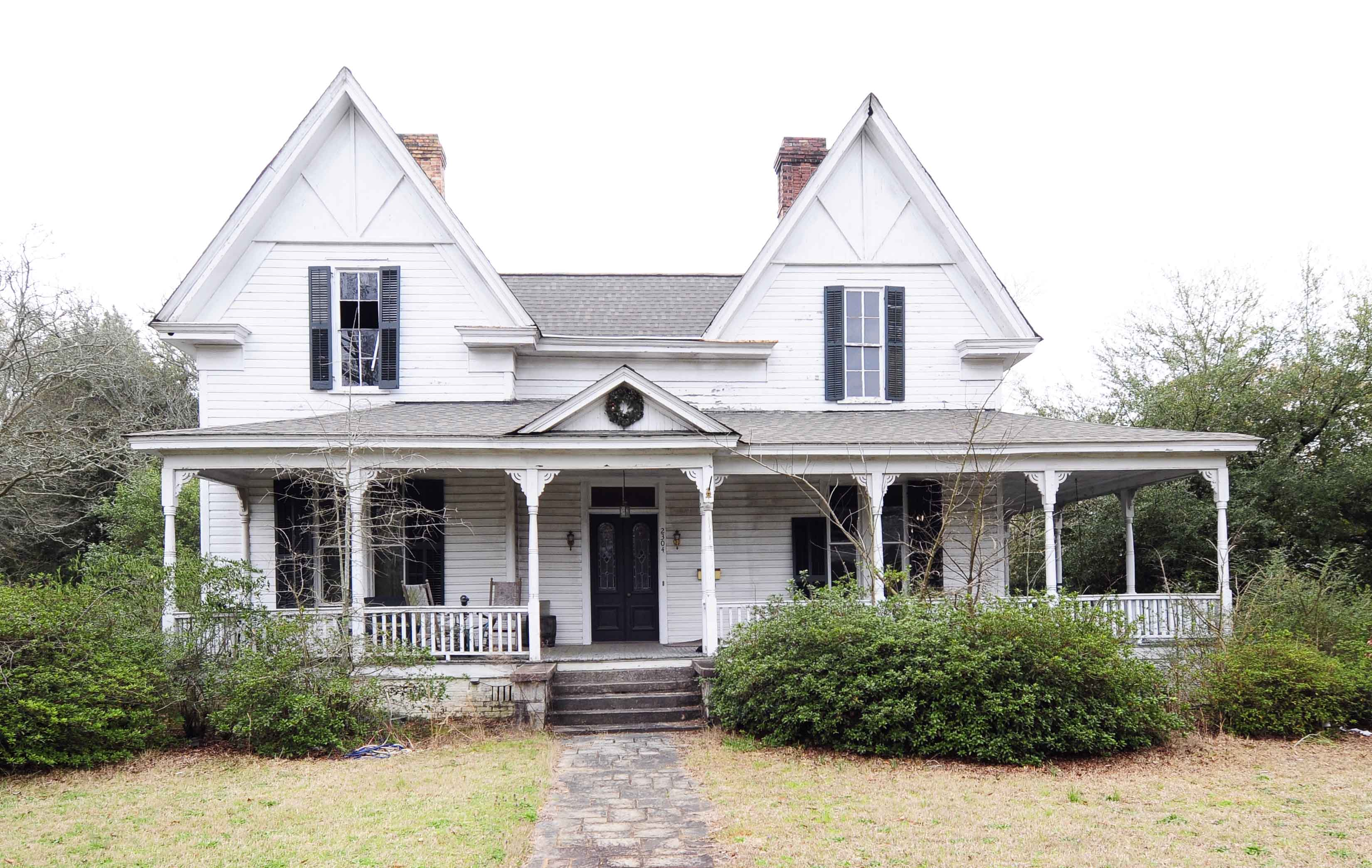
- Ike Reighley House, March 2012

- Location within South Carolina Location within the United States
- Location: 2304 Main St., Newberry, South Carolina
- Coordinates: 34°16′45″N 81°36′23″W
- Area: 0.6 acres (0.24 ha)
- Built: c. 1885
- Architectural style: Stick/eastlake
- MPS: Newberry MRA
- NRHP reference No.: 80003684
- Added to NRHP: November 26, 1980

Ike Reighley House is a historic home located at Newberry, Newberry County, South Carolina, USA. It was built about 1885, and is a two-story, asymmetrical weatherboarded Victorian style dwelling. It features stick style decorative details on the wraparound porch.

It was listed on the National Register of Historic Places in 1980.
