= Coateswood =

Historic house in South Carolina, United States

- U.S. National Register of Historic Places
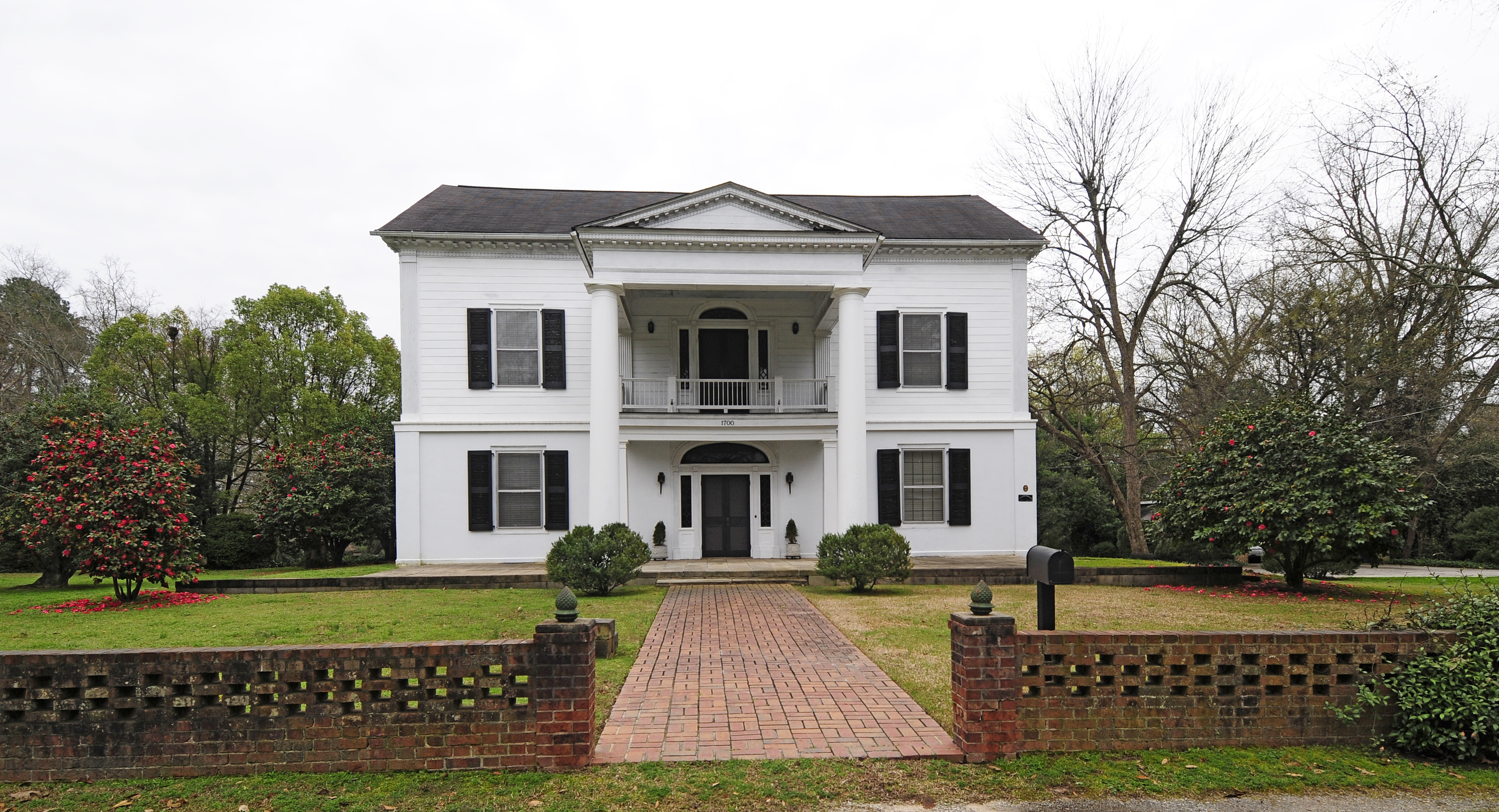
- Coateswood, March 2012

- Location within South Carolina Location within the United States
- Location: 1700 Boundary St., Newberry, South Carolina
- Coordinates: 34°16′28″N 81°36′52″W
- Area: 3 acres (1.2 ha)
- Built: 1841
- Built by: Phillip Schoppert
- NRHP reference No.: 75001704
- Added to NRHP: April 28, 1975

Coateswood, also known as the Job Johnstone House, is a historic home located at Newberry, Newberry County, South Carolina, USA. It was built in 1841 and is a gabled roof, brick and frame, Greek Revival style house. It was originally three stories; the third floor was removed and the roof lowered about 1940. The front facade has two monumental Roman Doric order columns that support a gabled portico and a second floor porch. Also on the property are a contributing garage, well house, and a building referred to as the Long House.

It was listed on the National Register of Historic Places in 1975.
