= Harrington Street Historic District =

Historic district in South Carolina, United States

- U.S. National Register of Historic Places
- U.S. Historic district
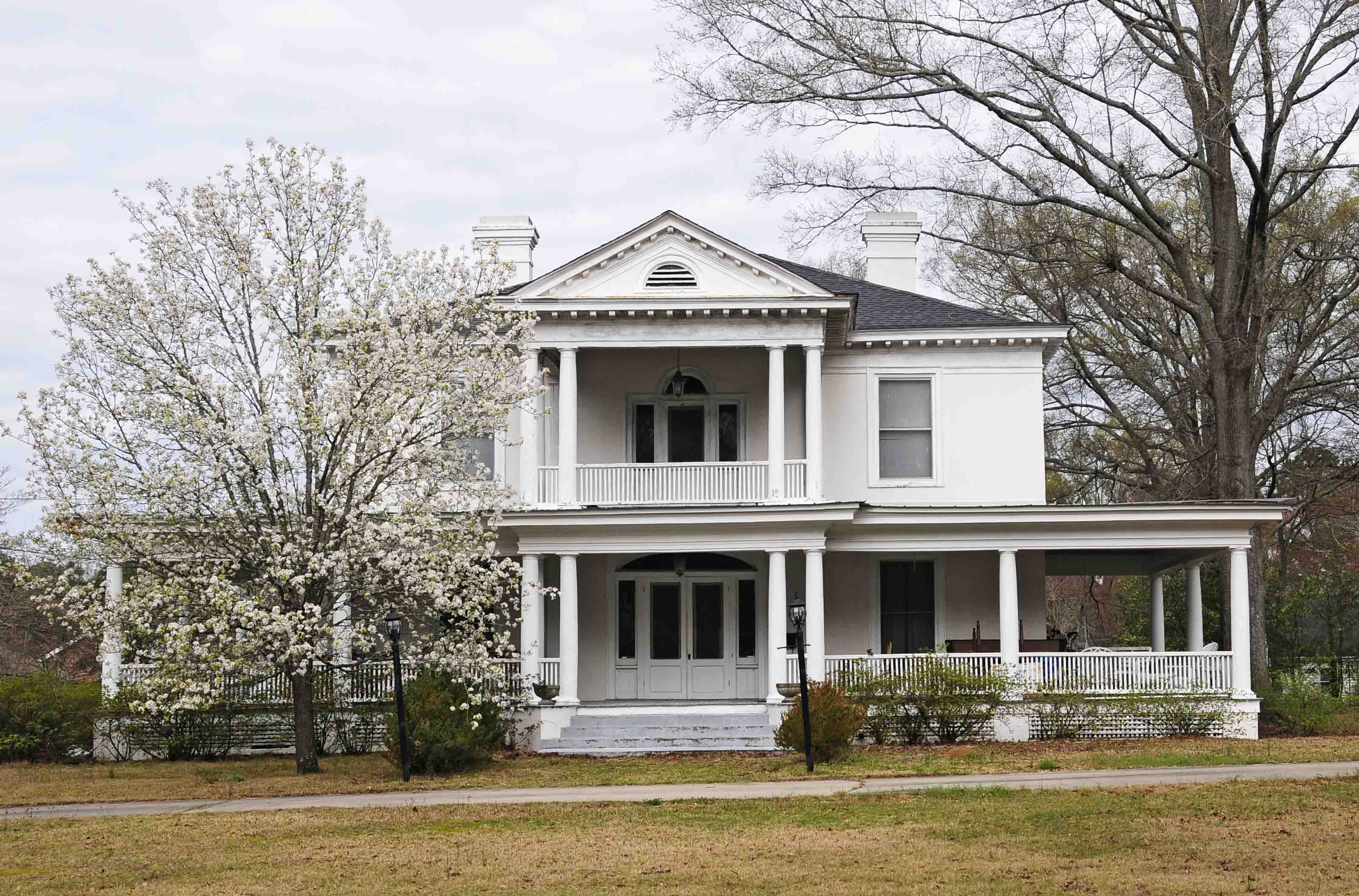
- William Mayes House, Harrington Street Historic District, March 2012

- Location within South Carolina Location within the United States
- Location: Harrington St., Newberry, South Carolina
- Coordinates: 34°16′53″N 81°38′00″W
- Area: 11.2 acres (4.5 ha)
- Built: 1930
- Architectural style: Classical Revival, Late Victorian
- MPS: Newberry MRA
- NRHP reference No.: 80004462
- Added to NRHP: November 26, 1980

Harrington Street Historic District is a national historic district located at Newberry, Newberry County, South Carolina. The district encompasses 11 contributing buildings in Newberry. The district includes residences dating from about 1870 to 1930. They include Victorian raised cottages, a Neoclassical style mansion, and shotgun and bungalow vernacular styles.

It was listed on the National Register of Historic Places in 1980.
