= Osborne Wells House =

Historic house in South Carolina, United States

- U.S. National Register of Historic Places
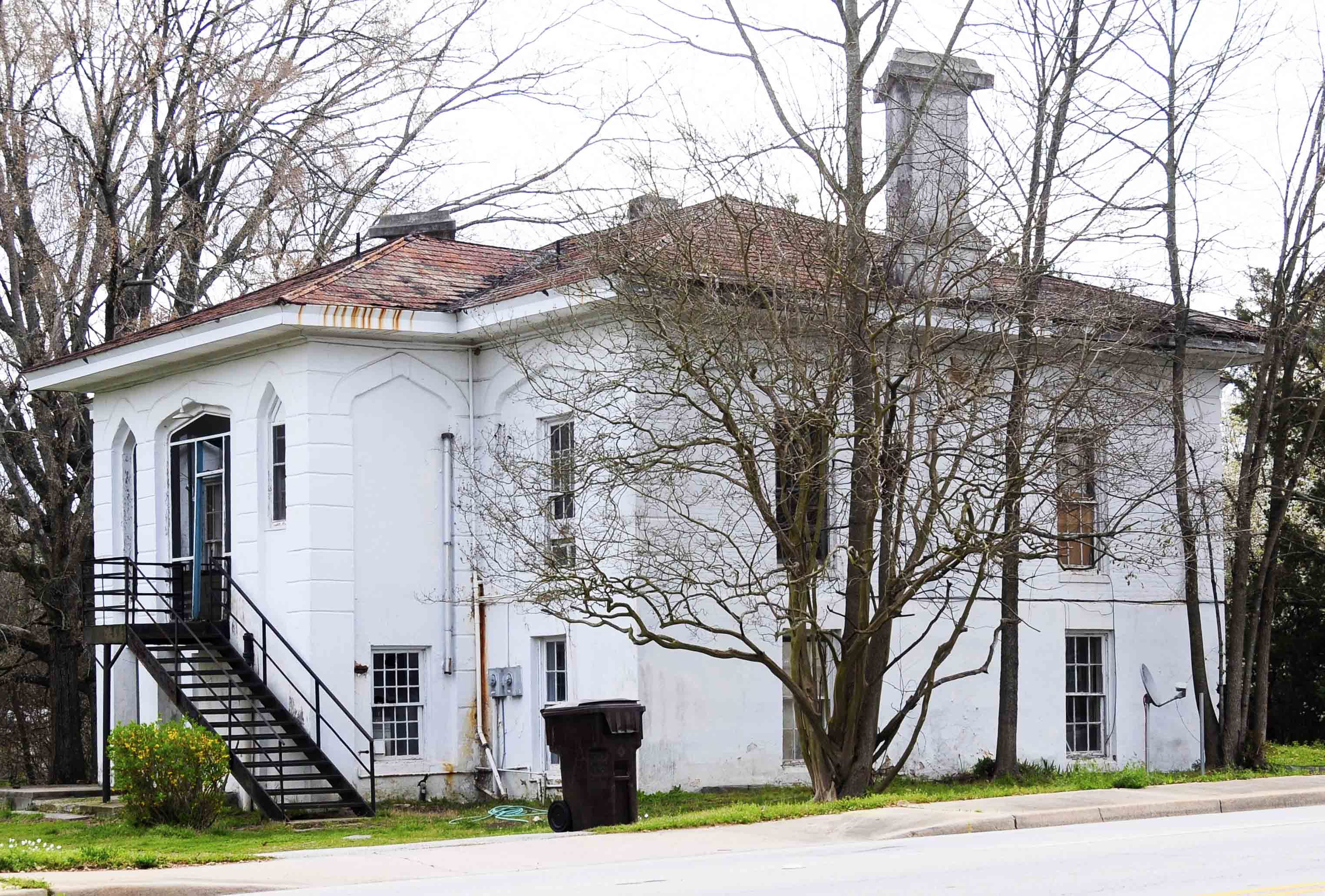
- Osborne Wells House, March 2012

- Location within South Carolina Location within the United States
- Location: 1101 Fair St., Newberry, South Carolina
- Coordinates: 34°16′57″N 81°37′37″W
- Area: 0.8 acres (0.32 ha)
- Built: c. 1860
- Built by: Wells, Osborne
- MPS: Newberry MRA
- NRHP reference No.: 80003690
- Added to NRHP: November 26, 1980

Osborne Wells House is a historic home located at Newberry, Newberry County, South Carolina. It was built about 1860, and is a brick and stucco residence consisting of a piano nobile over a raised basement. It features a projecting raised porch supported by four stuccoed brick piers. It was built by Osborne Wells, a prominent 19th century Newberry builder, planter, and brick manufacturer.

It was listed on the National Register of Historic Places in 1980.
