= George Mower House =

Historic house in South Carolina, United States

- U.S. National Register of Historic Places
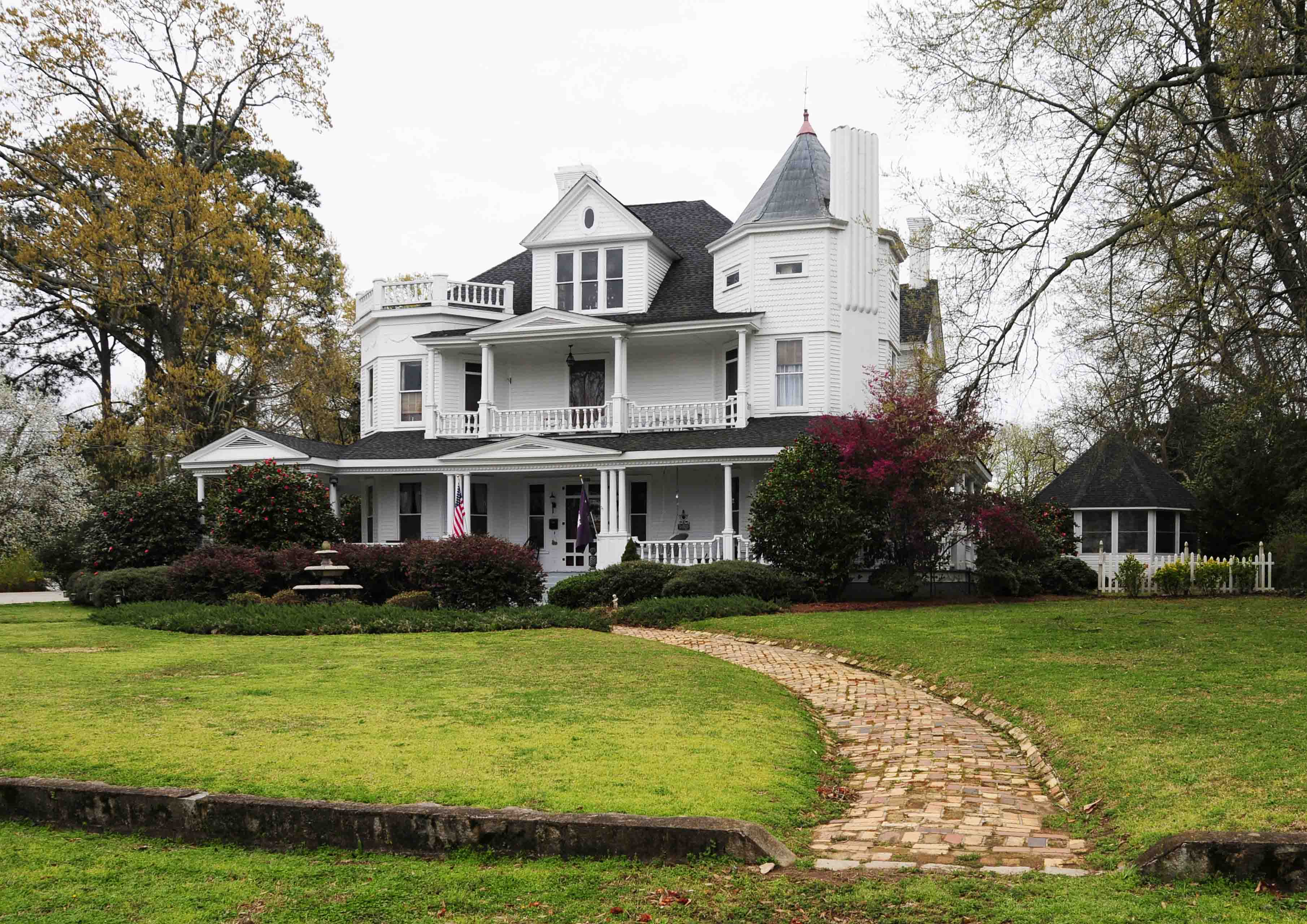
- George Mower House, March 2012

- Location within South Carolina Location within the United States
- Location: 1526 Boundary St., Newberry, South Carolina
- Coordinates: 34°16′25″N 81°35′38″W
- Area: 1.2 acres (0.49 ha)
- Built: 1893
- Built by: Davis, "Cam"
- Architectural style: Queen Anne
- MPS: Newberry MRA
- NRHP reference No.: 80003683
- Added to NRHP: November 26, 1980

George Mower House is a historic home located at Newberry, Newberry County, South Carolina. It was built in 1893, and is a two-story, weatherboarded Queen Anne style dwelling. It features prominent polygonal end turrets and a pedimented dormer. It was built for George Mower, prominent Newberry attorney, director of Newberry Cotton Mills, and member of the South Carolina House of Representatives (1888-1890, 1910–16) and the South Carolina Senate (1893-1904).

It was listed on the National Register of Historic Places in 1980.
