= Prosperity Cemetery =

- U.S. National Register of Historic Places
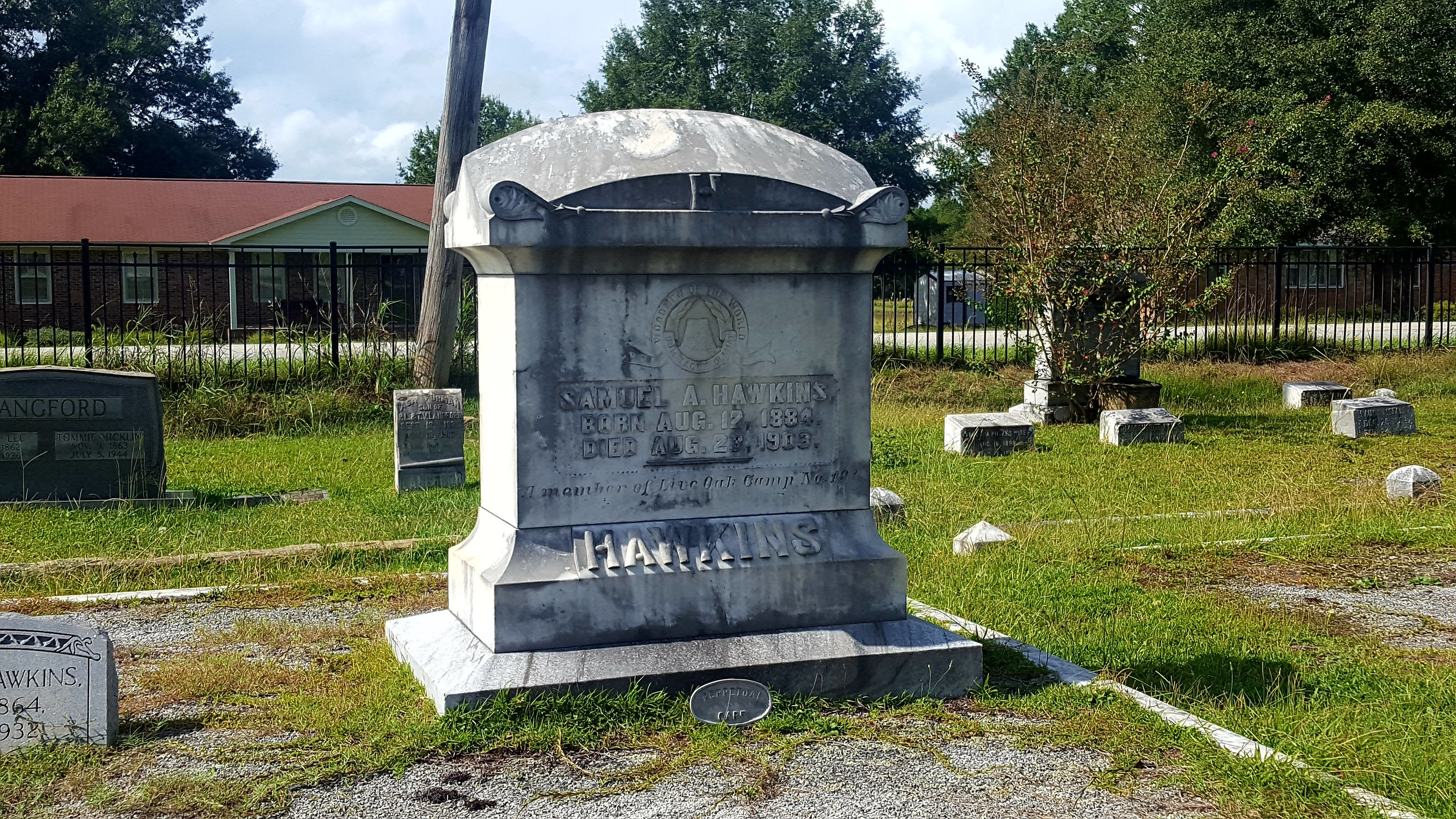

- Location within South Carolina Location within the United States
- Location: McNeary Street; Prosperity, South Carolina
- Coordinates: 34°11′54″N 81°31′48″W
- Area: 3 acres (1.2 ha)
- Built: c. 1802
- NRHP reference No.: 13001097
- Added to NRHP: January 15, 2014

The Prosperity Cemetery is located on McNeary Street (South Carolina Route 391) on the south side of Prosperity, South Carolina, United States. The cemetery is about 3 acres (1.2 ha) in size, with more than 1,000 marked graves dating back to its founding in 1802. The cemetery is distinctive for the fine quality of its funerary art in what is essentially a rural backcountry setting, and for the unusual concentration of gravestones that were signed by local merchants and stonecutters. The cemetery was established as the burying ground for a Presbyterian congregation, but is now managed by a local cemetery company and now serves as the town's main cemetery.

The cemetery was listed on the National Register of Historic Places in 2013.

== See also ==
- National Register of Historic Places listings in Newberry County, South Carolina
