= Summer Brothers Stores =

- U.S. National Register of Historic Places
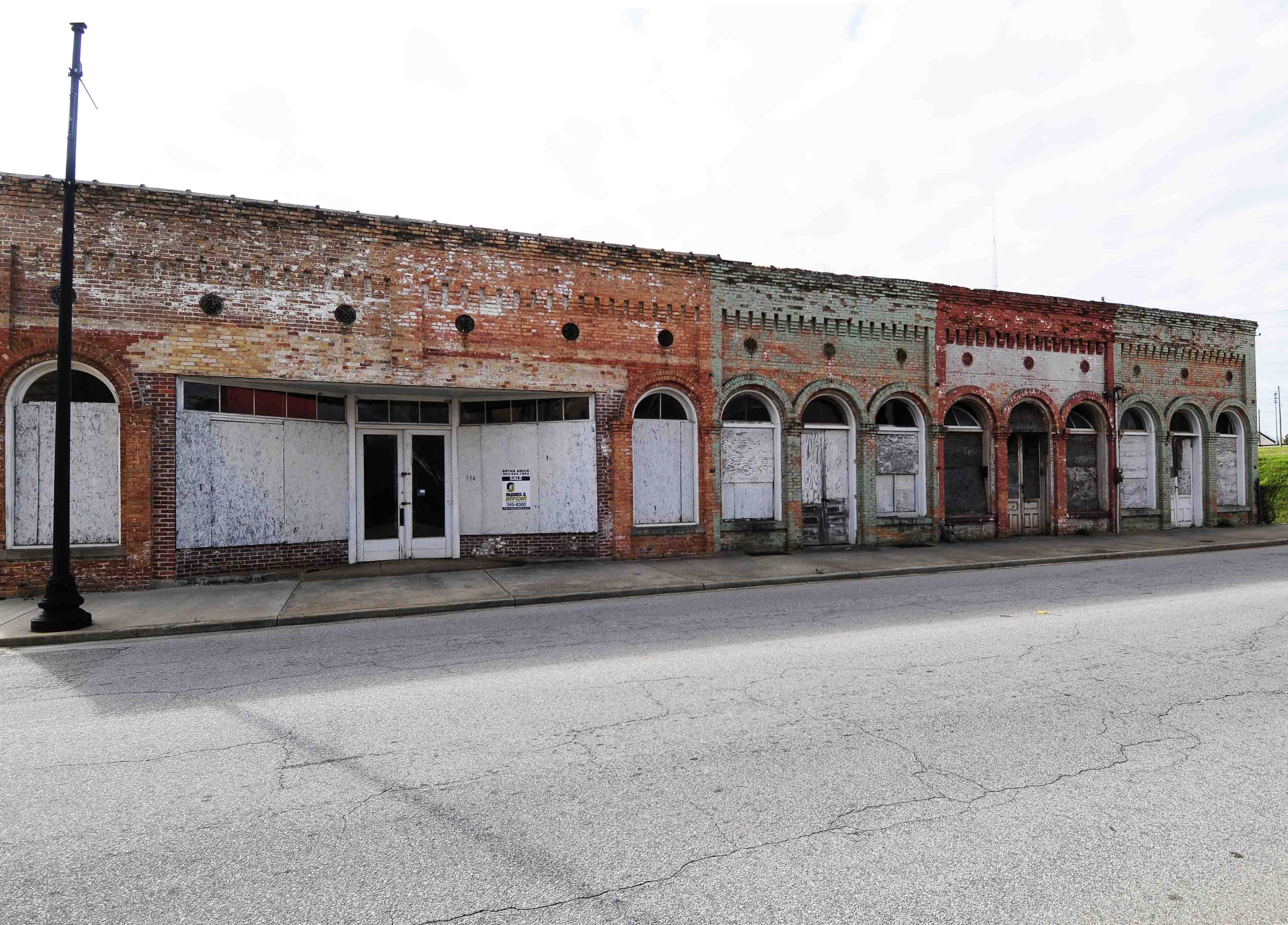
- Summer Brothers Store, March 2012

- Location within South Carolina Location within the United States
- Location: 900 Main St., Newberry, South Carolina
- Coordinates: 34°16′23″N 81°37′20″W
- Area: 0.2 acres (0.081 ha)
- Built: 1898
- MPS: Newberry MRA
- NRHP reference No.: 80003686
- Added to NRHP: November 26, 1980

Summer Brothers Stores is a historic commercial building located at Newberry, Newberry County, South Carolina. It was built in 1898, and is a row of four one-story brick commercial buildings. The front façade features a repetitive arched arcade with small circular ventilator grilles above.

It was listed on the National Register of Historic Places in 1980.
