= Timberhouse =

Historic house in South Carolina, United States

- U.S. National Register of Historic Places
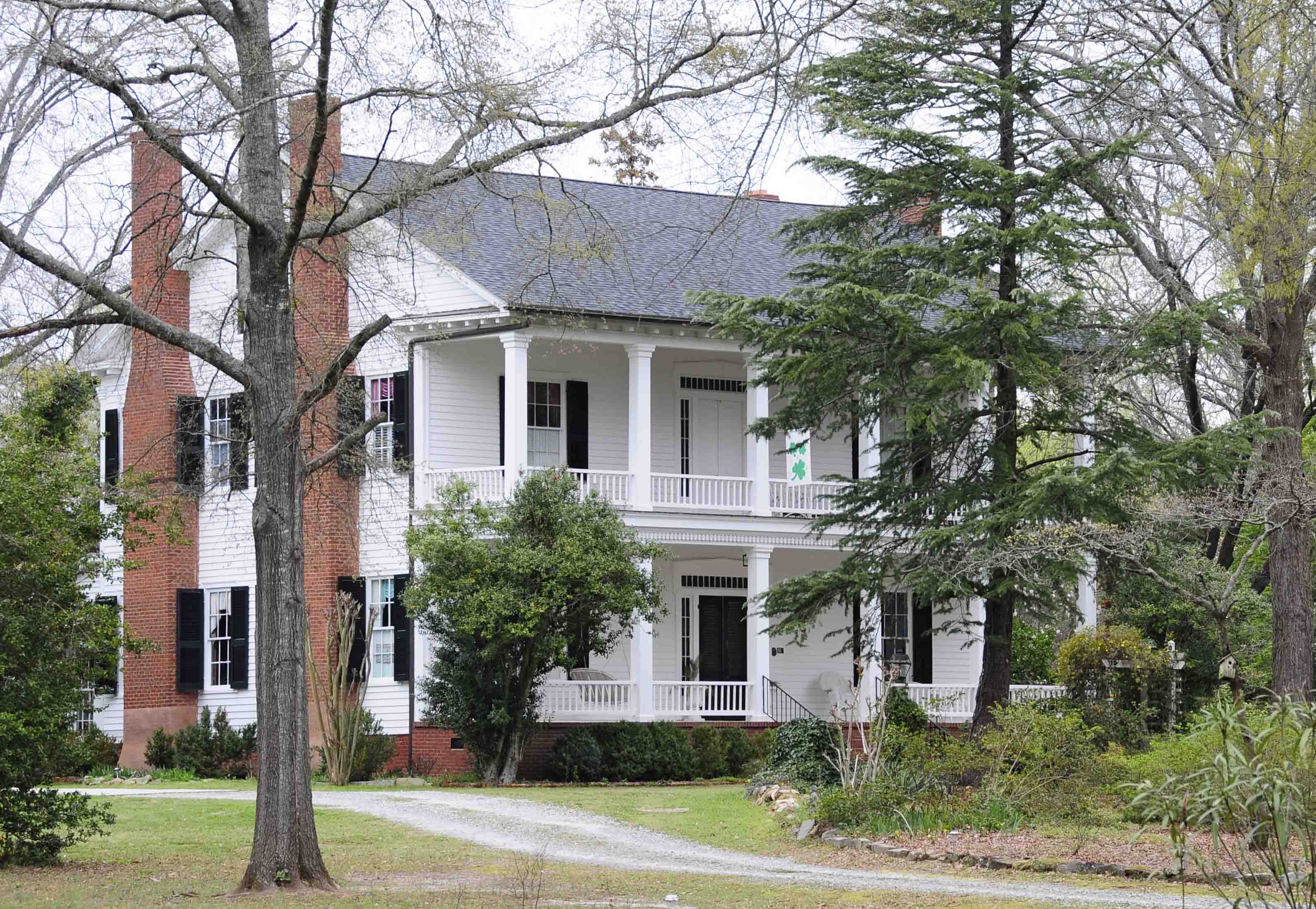
- Timberhouse, March 2012

- Location within South Carolina Location within the United States
- Location: 1427 Ebenezer Rd., Newberry, South Carolina
- Coordinates: 34°15′36″N 81°36′15″W
- Area: 7.2 acres (2.9 ha)
- Built: c. 1858
- Built by: Jacob Kibler
- Architectural style: Greek Revival
- MPS: Newberry MRA
- NRHP reference No.: 80003687
- Added to NRHP: November 26, 1980

Timberhouse is a historic plantation house located at Newberry, Newberry County, South Carolina. It was built about 1858 by Jacob Kibler, and is a two-story, weatherboarded Greek Revival style dwelling. It features double-tiered full-width porches supported by six square wood pillars and exterior end chimneys.

It was listed on the National Register of Historic Places in 1980.

Kibler, who built the residence, owned 68 slaves in 1850, eight years before Timberhouse was constructed.
