= West Boundary Street Historic District =

Historic district in South Carolina, United States

- U.S. National Register of Historic Places
- U.S. Historic district
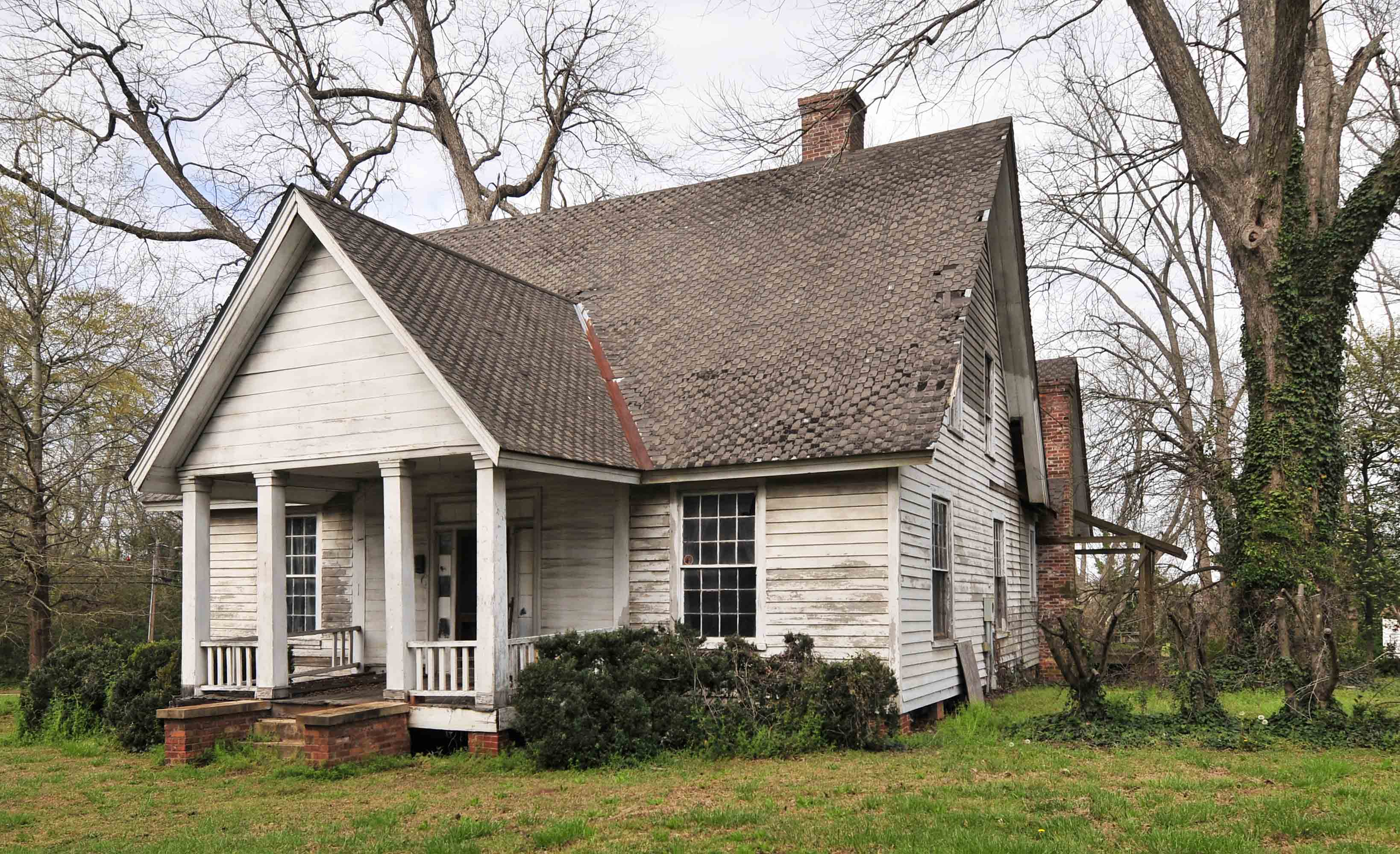
- House in the West Boundary Street Historic District, March 2012

- Location within South Carolina Location within the United States
- Location: Boundary and Jessica Sts., Newberry, South Carolina
- Coordinates: 34°16′00″N 81°37′29″W
- Area: 5.8 acres (2.3 ha)
- Built: 1870
- Built by: Blease, James Hartwell
- Architectural style: Greek Revival
- MPS: Newberry MRA
- NRHP reference No.: 80003691
- Added to NRHP: November 26, 1980

West Boundary Street Historic District is a national historic district located at Newberry, Newberry County, South Carolina. The district encompasses six contributing buildings and one contributing site in a residential neighborhood of Newberry. The four residences date between 1840 and 1935, and include examples of the Greek Revival, a Victorian raised cottage, and Bungalow styles.

It was listed on the National Register of Historic Places in 1980.
