= Caldwell Street Historic District =

Historic district in South Carolina, United States

- U.S. National Register of Historic Places
- U.S. Historic district
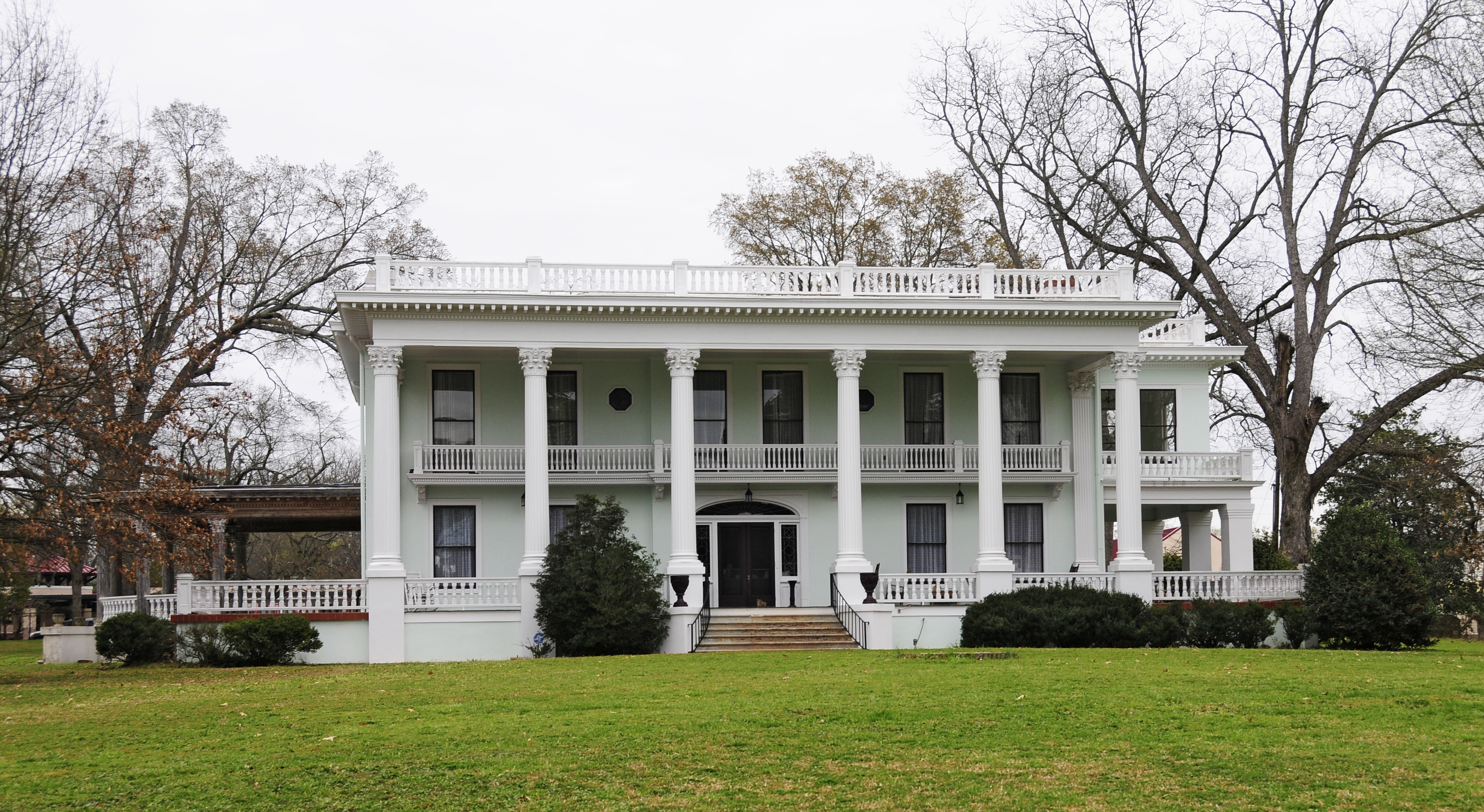
- House in the Caldwell Street Historic District, March 2012

- Location within South Carolina Location within the United States
- Location: Caldwell St., Newberry, South Carolina
- Coordinates: 34°16′17″N 81°37′02″W
- Area: 15.9 acres (6.4 ha)
- Built: 1918
- Built by: Davis, C. C.
- Architectural style: Classical Revival
- MPS: Newberry MRA
- NRHP reference No.: 80004464
- Added to NRHP: November 26, 1980

Caldwell Street Historic District is a national historic district located at Newberry, Newberry County, South Carolina. The district encompasses 10 contributing buildings and 1 contributing site in Newberry. The district includes eight upper class residences, two churches, and a cemetery. The buildings reflect popular architectural styles from the late-19th and early-20th century including Victorian, Queen Anne, Tudor Revival, Gothic Revival, and Neoclassical.

It was listed on the National Register of Historic Places in 1980.
