= Cousins House =

Historic house in South Carolina, United States

- U.S. National Register of Historic Places
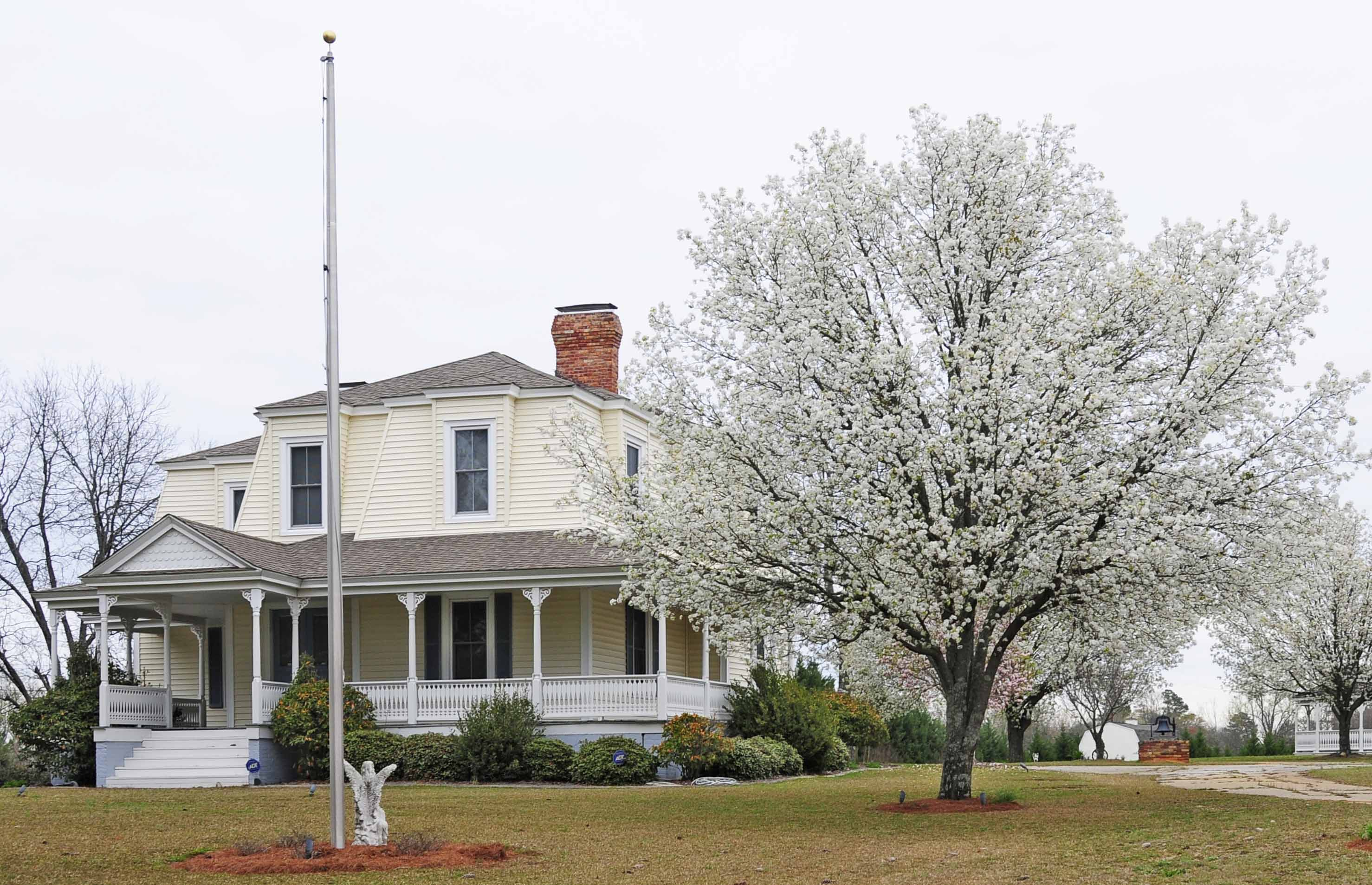

- Location within South Carolina Location within the United States
- Location: Nance St. Extension, Newberry, South Carolina
- Coordinates: 34°15′40″N 81°36′37″W
- Area: 9.5 acres (3.8 ha)
- Built: 1880
- Architect: Davis, C. C.
- Architectural style: Second Empire
- MPS: Newberry MRA
- NRHP reference No.: 80004473
- Added to NRHP: November 26, 1980

Cousins House in Newberry, South Carolina was built in 1880. It was listed on the National Register of Historic Places in 1980.
