= Newberry College Historic District =

U.S. historic district at Newberry College

- U.S. National Register of Historic Places
- U.S. Historic district
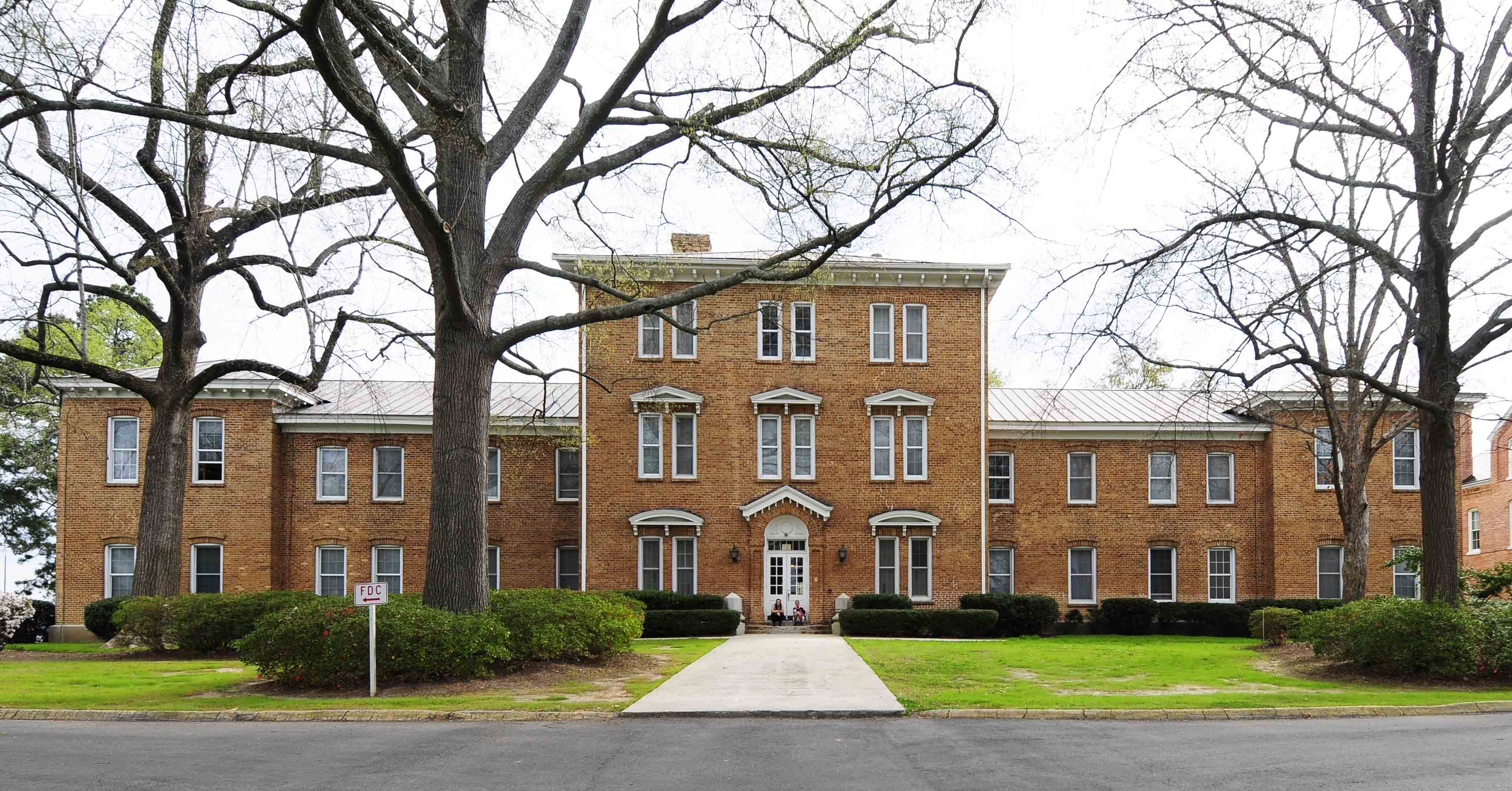
- Smeltzer Hall, Newberry College Historic District, March 2012

- Location within South Carolina Location within the United States
- Location: 2100 College St., Newberry, South Carolina
- Coordinates: 34°17′06″N 81°37′18″W
- Area: 12 acres (4.9 ha)
- Built: 1895
- Architect: Milburn, Frank P.
- Architectural style: Classical Revival, Italianate
- NRHP reference No.: 76001706
- Added to NRHP: June 23, 1976

Newberry College Historic District is a national historic district located on the campus of Newberry College at Newberry, Newberry County, South Carolina. The district encompasses four contributing buildings and are Smeltzer Hall (1877), Keller Hall (1895), Holland Hall (1904, designed by Frank Pierce Milburn), and Derrick Hall (1925). Smeltzer Hall and Keller Hall reflect the Italianate, and Holland and Derrick Halls reflect the Neo-Classical and Colonial Revival styles.

It was listed on the National Register of Historic Places in 1976.
