= Newberry Opera House =

Theater in Newberry, South Carolina, United States

- U.S. National Register of Historic Places
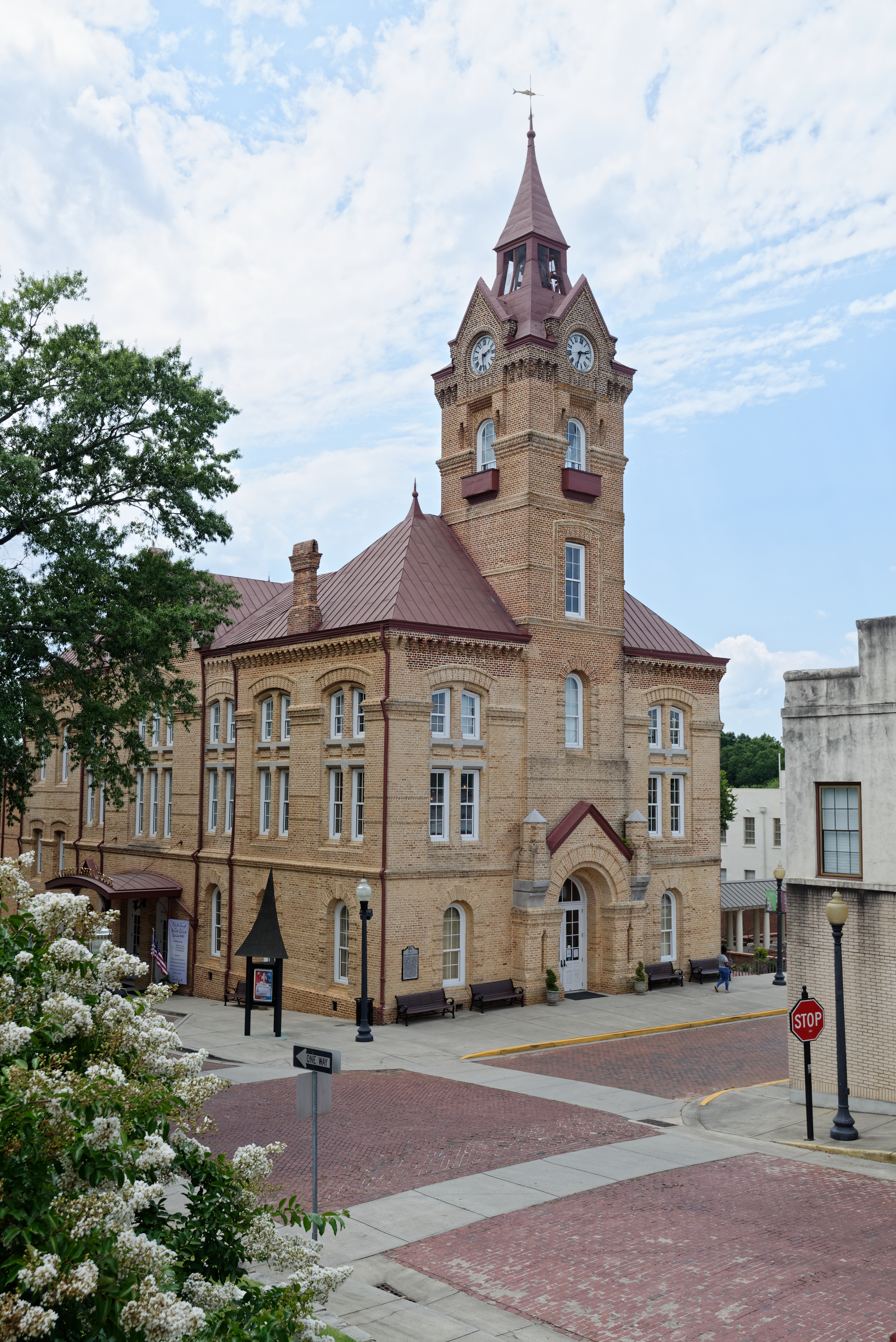
- Newberry Opera House

- Location within South Carolina Location within the United States
- Location: Boyce and Nance Sts., Newberry, South Carolina
- Coordinates: 34.27453°N 81.62091°W
- Area: 0.8 acres (0.32 ha)
- Built: 1882
- Architect: G. L. Norrman
- Architectural style: Gothic
- NRHP reference No.: 69000171
- Added to NRHP: December 03, 1969

The Newberry Opera House, located in Newberry, South Carolina, is a fully restored historic building that is a live-performance space for popular artists, touring theatre companies, and local organizations. It is listed on the National Register of Historic Places in 1969.

Designed in the French Gothic style, the first floor of the building was used by the town government for offices, a jail, and the fire company, which had one engine there. The upper floor was designed as a theater and supporting spaces. For years it attracted national touring companies, individual performers and a variety of theatre acts. It later was adapted also for use as a movie theater, but showed its last movie in 1952. It was restored beginning in 1998, in a project that included an addition to enable its use for full theatrical productions.

== History ==
The building was designed in the French Gothic style as both a place of entertainment and as a seat of government for the city. The building, completed in 1881 and dedicated in 1882, had a clock tower 130 feet (40 m) topped with a garfish weather vane.

The original design called for the first floor to house the fire engine room, town council chambers, a clerk's office, a police officer, and three jail cells. The second floor contained a hall with 426 seats, 53 by 52 feet (16 m) in size. Also on this floor were a ticket office, a "green room", a cloakroom, and three dressing rooms. Drop curtains and seven scenes or sets for the stage were available. One scene, a landscape, survived to the late 20th century.

The Opera House quickly became known as "the entertainment center of the Midlands". Touring companies of New York City plays, minstrel and variety shows, famed vocalists and lecturers, magicians and mind readers, novelty acts and boxing exhibitions all were featured there. It was used not only by professional performers, but also by the community for meetings, dances, college commencement exercises, and musicals. Notable artists, such as Edwin Booth, John Barrymore and his family, and Tallulah Bankhead are known to have performed there.

The first film shown there was The Birth of a Nation (1915), a silent movie, and others followed. The early Edison "Talkies," using a phonograph record for sound, were introduced in the 1920s. Slowly, movies replaced the stage shows. In the 1920s, the Opera House was remodeled as a movie theater.

In 1952, after the showing of The Outlaw, the Opera House was closed as a movie theater. During the movie era, the original horseshoe-shaped balcony was reduced in size, this restricted seating across the back of the auditorium to blacks only; the state had racial segregation in facilities. The city added an outdoor open stairway which they required blacks to use for entry. Since the mid-1960s, such public facilities have been integrated.

By 1959, there was talk about tearing the building down, but the hall was still used for community purposes, and the city used the first floor. In 1969, the Newberry Historical Society promoted the preservation of the Opera House, as did several other community groups. In 1970, the building was placed on the National Register of Historic Places.

After the City of Newberry vacated the building in the mid 1990s, the Newberry Opera House Foundation was established to assess restoration. Recognizing the lack of performance spaces in the Midlands, it consulted with experts about a proposed project. Since proceeding with a restoration plan, it has managed fundraising and operations of the facility, which it leases from the city.

The exterior restoration and window replacement was completed in 1994, and the interior renovation began in 1996. It included restoration of the horseshoe-shaped balcony. An additional 10,000 square feet (930 m^{2}) was added to the original building in order to create a full theatrical production facility: a new loading dock, an elevator, a second stage for rehearsal, and dressing rooms. The total cost of the renovation was approximately $5.5 million. Architects for the renovation and addition were Craig Gaulden Davis of Greenville, South Carolina.

A variety of theatrical touring companies and live-performance artists from Willie Nelson to Michael Bolton, the Newberry Ballet Guild, South Carolina Opera Company and Asheville Lyric Opera have all performed there, keeping the hall busy. It has a maximum capacity of 426. It is also used for performances by Newberry College and other community institutions.

== See also ==
- National Register of Historic Places listings in Newberry County, South Carolina
