= Prosperity, South Carolina =

- Town
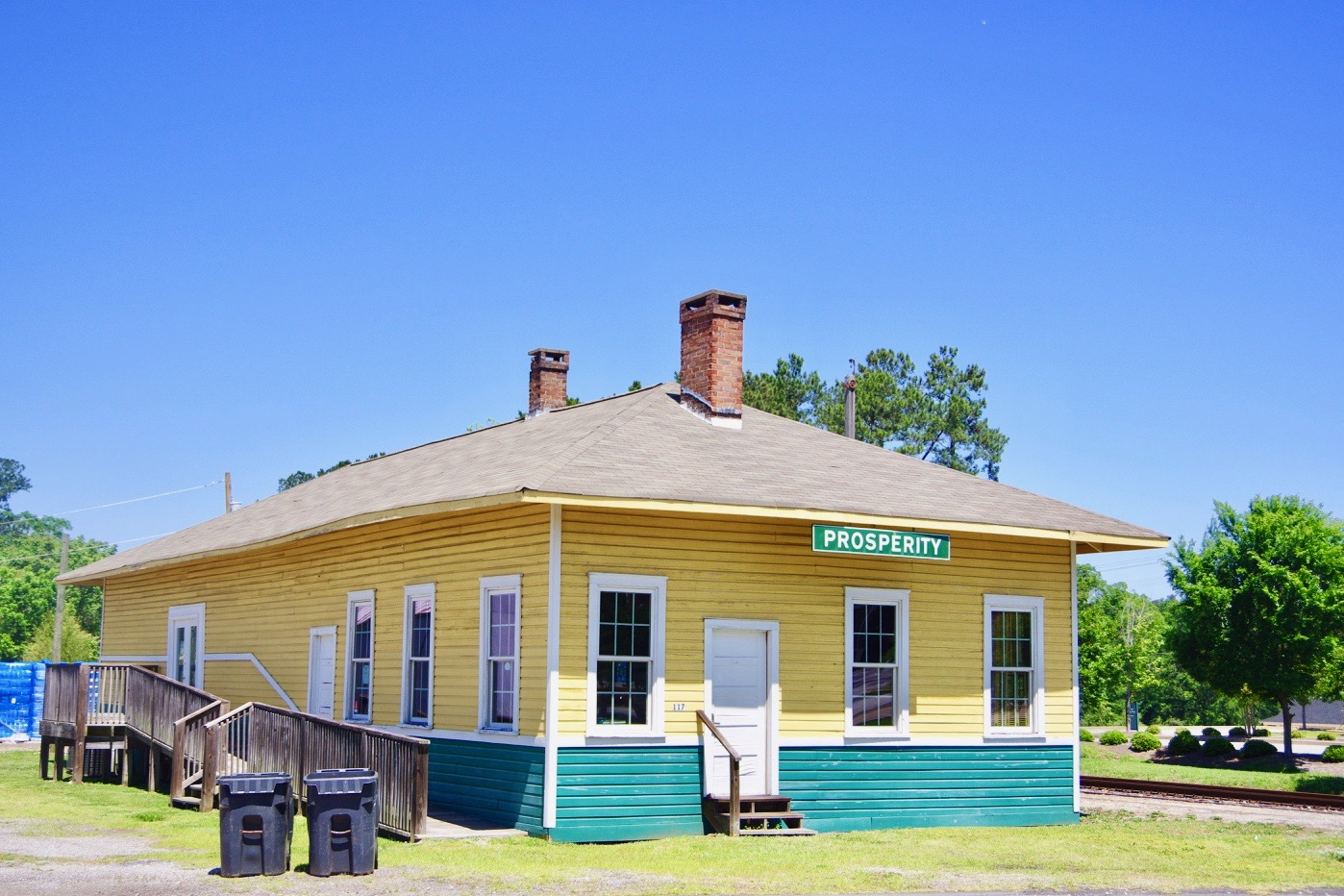
- Prosperity Depot
- Motto: "Equal to the Name"
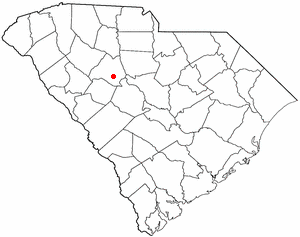
- Location of Prosperity, South Carolina
- Coordinates: 34°12′44″N 81°31′58″W
- Country: United States
- State: South Carolina
- County: Newberry

Area
  - Total: 1.97 sq mi (5.11 km^{2})
  - Land: 1.97 sq mi (5.11 km^{2})
  - Water: 0 sq mi (0.00 km^{2})
- Elevation: 522 ft (159 m)

Population (2020)
  - Total: 1,178
  - Density: 597.3/sq mi (230.62/km^{2})
- Time zone: UTC-5 (Eastern (EST))
  - Summer (DST): UTC-4 (EDT)
- ZIP code: 29127
- Area codes: 803, 839
- FIPS code: 45-58705
- GNIS feature ID: 2407164
- Website: www.prosperitysc.com

Prosperity is a town in Newberry County, South Carolina, United States. The population was 1,178 at the 2020 U.S. census.

== History ==
Before being named Prosperity, the area was called Frog Level due to its low-lying location and large numbers of frogs living in adjacent ponds. Captain Matthew Hall settled in the area in 1827, and established a store and post office in the early 1830s. The town expanded with the arrival of the railroad in the 1850s, and in later decades would profit from its location along two major rail lines. After a fire destroyed part of the town in 1873, the town's residents voted to change the name of the town to "Prosperity" after the Prosperity Associate Reformed Presbyterian Church.

The Jacob Bedenbaugh House, Howard Junior High School, and Prosperity Cemetery are listed on the National Register of Historic Places.

== Geography ==
The town is concentrated around the intersection of U.S. Route 76 and South Carolina Highway 391 northwest of Columbia. Lake Murray lies just to the south.

According to the United States Census Bureau, the town has a total area of 2.1 square miles (5.5 km^{2}), all land.

== Demographics ==
Historical population
Census	Pop.	Note	%±
1880	357		—
1890	565		58.3%
1900	592		4.8%
1910	737		24.5%
1920	748		1.5%
1930	844		12.8%
1940	719		−14.8%
1950	699		−2.8%
1960	757		8.3%
1970	762		0.7%
1980	803		5.4%
1990	1,116		39.0%
2000	1,047		−6.2%
2010	1,180		12.7%
2020	1,178		−0.2%
U.S. Decennial Census

As of the census of 2000, there were 1,047 people, 415 households, and 293 families residing in the town. The population density was 495.9 inhabitants per square mile (191.5/km^{2}). There were 456 housing units at an average density of 216.0 per square mile (83.4/km^{2}). The racial makeup of the town was 53.20% White, 44.79% African American, 0.67% Asian, 0.48% Pacific Islander, 0.19% from other races, and 0.67% from two or more races. Hispanic or Latino of any race were 2.39% of the population.

There were 415 households, out of which 33.5% had children under the age of 18 living with them, 46.0% were married couples living together, 19.5% had a female householder with no husband present, and 29.2% were non-families. 26.3% of all households were made up of individuals, and 13.3% had someone living alone who was 65 years of age or older. The average household size was 2.51 and the average family size was 3.01.

In the town, the population was spread out, with 27.8% under the age of 18, 7.1% from 18 to 24, 29.1% from 25 to 44, 22.0% from 45 to 64, and 14.0% who were 65 years of age or older. The median age was 35 years. For every 100 females, there were 78.4 males. For every 100 females age 18 and over, there were 77.5 males.

The median income for a household in the town was $30,875, and the median income for a family was $39,261. Males had a median income of $31,406 versus $19,226 for females. The per capita income for the town was $15,323. About 14.6% of families and 16.9% of the population were below the poverty line, including 22.5% of those under age 18 and 14.9% of those age 65 or over.

== Notable people ==
- John Buzhardt, Major League Baseball pitcher
- Carl Edwards Jr., Major League Baseball pitcher
- Charles Cecil Wyche, United States federal judge
