= Burton House (Newberry, South Carolina) =

Historic house in South Carolina, United States

- U.S. National Register of Historic Places
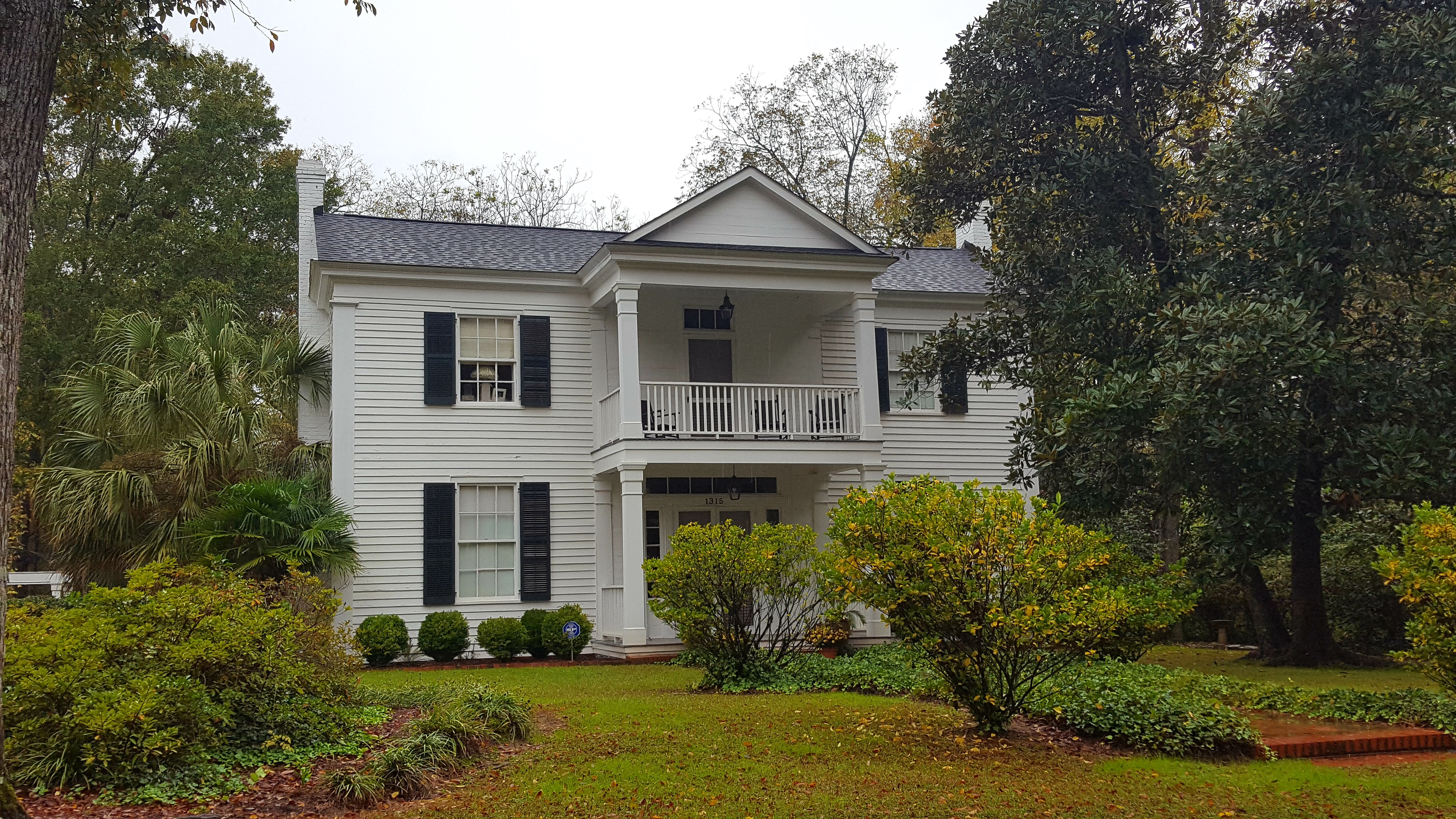

- Location within South Carolina Location within the United States
- Location: 1315 Glenn St. Newberry, South Carolina
- Coordinates: 34°16′53″N 81°36′44″W
- Area: 0.2 acres (0.081 ha)
- Built: 1857
- Architectural style: Neoclassical
- MPS: Newberry MRA
- NRHP reference No.: 80003681
- Added to NRHP: November 26, 1980

The Burton House is a historic plantation-style house in Newberry, South Carolina, United States. Constructed shortly before the Civil War, it features a range of architectural details in classical architectural style. Although it changed owners in its early years, it was owned by members of the namesake Burton family for approximately a century, and it has been named a historic site.

Although located in the city of Newberry, the house is built in the style of plantation houses in the countryside: it features Neoclassical components, although in a diminished and vernacular mode. The house is a two-story rectangle with a central portico dominating the facade. Square wooden pillars support each story of the portico, while pilasters in a similar style are placed at the portico's junctions with the main body of the house. As a second-story door provides access to the second story of the portico, the space between pillars and pilasters is filled with an unadorned balustrade. Multi-pane transom lights are placed above both the main entrance and the second-story door to the portico, in addition to sidelights around the main entrance. Topping the house is a gabled roof, which culminates in a pediment atop the portico. The entire house is a wooden building comprising nearly 5,000 square feet (460 m^{2}), although only about 4,000 square feet (370 m^{2}) are finished. Three fireplaces are located throughout the building, which is underlain by a crawlspace.

Although the precise date of construction for the Burton House is unknown, it was constructed circa 1857. From 1856 until 1858, the property was owned by one of Newberry's first men, William Walter Houseal, a merchant who was elected to hold local office. Thirty years after Houseal sold the property, it was bought by James A. Burton, who was active in the sale of insurance; a 1921 city directory records him as selling both real estate and fire insurance from an office on Caldwell Street, while still living in the house on Glenn Street. Burton's descendants owned the property into the 1980s, although it has since passed out of the family.

In November 1980, the Burton House was listed on the National Register of Historic Places, qualifying because of its historically significant architecture; it was part of a group of Newberry locations added to the Register together as part of a multiple property submission. It is one of twenty-four individual properties and historic districts listed on the National Register in the city of Newberry and the surrounding area.
