= Newberry Historic District (Newberry, South Carolina) =

Historic district in South Carolina, United States

- Newberry Historic District and Two Boundary Increases
- U.S. National Register of Historic Places
- U.S. Historic district
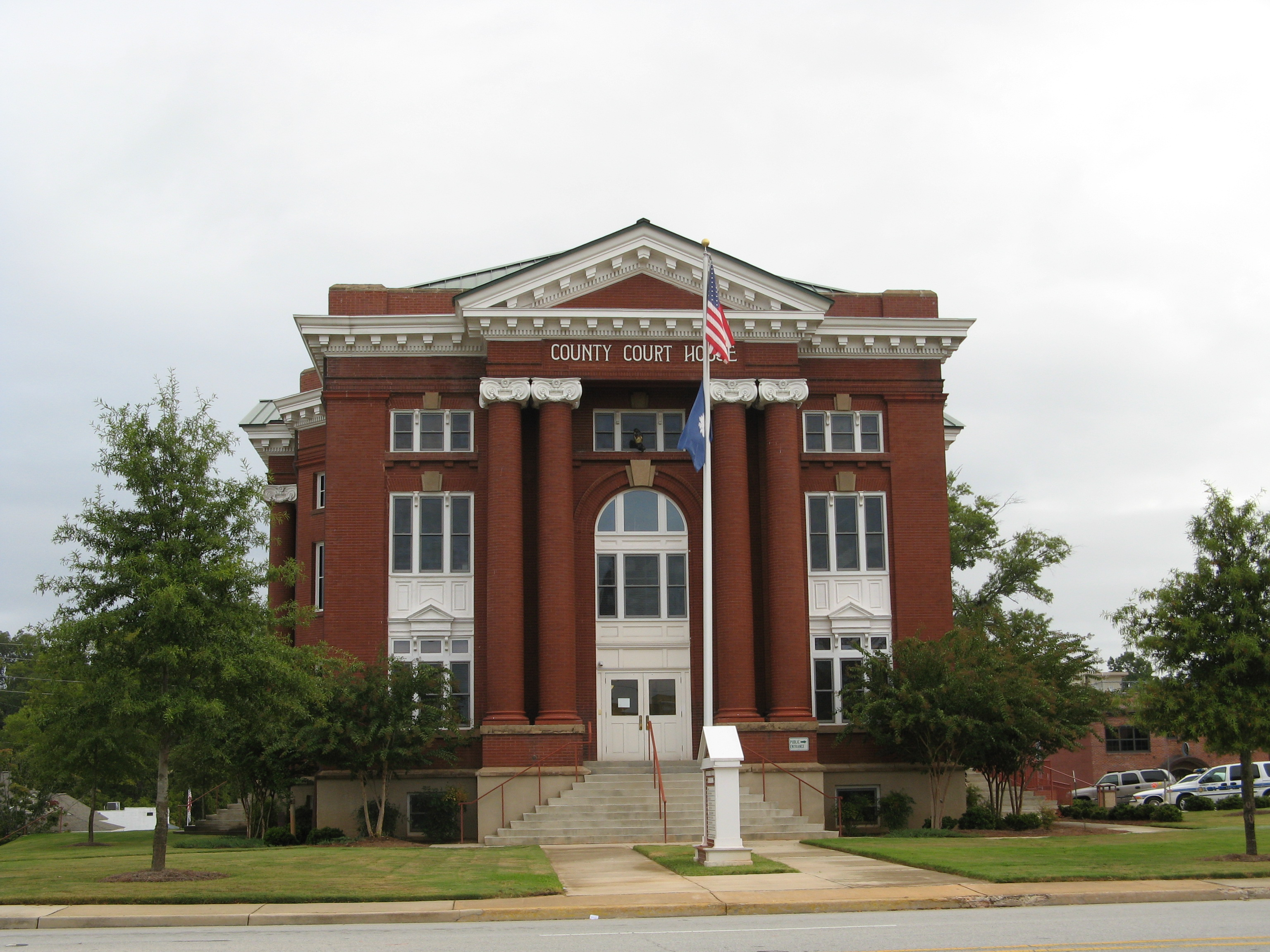
- The Newberry County Courthouse, a part of the district

- Location within South Carolina Location within the United States
- Location: Bounded roughly by Friend, College, McKibben, and Harrington Sts.; roughly bounded by Friend, McKibben, Harrington, Lindsay and Coates Sts.; and along sections of Main, Lindsay and Wilson Sts.
- Nearest city: Newberry, South Carolina
- Coordinates: 34°16′27″N 81°37′28″W
- Area: 2 acres (0.81 ha); 5.4 acres (2.2 ha); 3 acres (1.2 ha)
- Built: 1789
- Architectural style: Romanesque
- MPS: Newberry MRA
- NRHP reference No.: 74001870; 04000617 (original); 80003680 (increase 1); 04000617 (increase 2)

Significant dates
- Added to NRHP: December 31, 1974
- Boundary increases: November 26, 1980; June 16, 2004

The Newberry Historic District is a historic district in Newberry, South Carolina, United States. Among its thirty-five contributing properties is a building dating back to 1789. It was listed on the National Register of Historic Places in 1974.

It includes the Old Courthouse and Newberry Opera House, which are separately NRHP-listed.
