= College Street Historic District (Newberry, South Carolina) =

Historic district in South Carolina, United States

- U.S. National Register of Historic Places
- U.S. Historic district
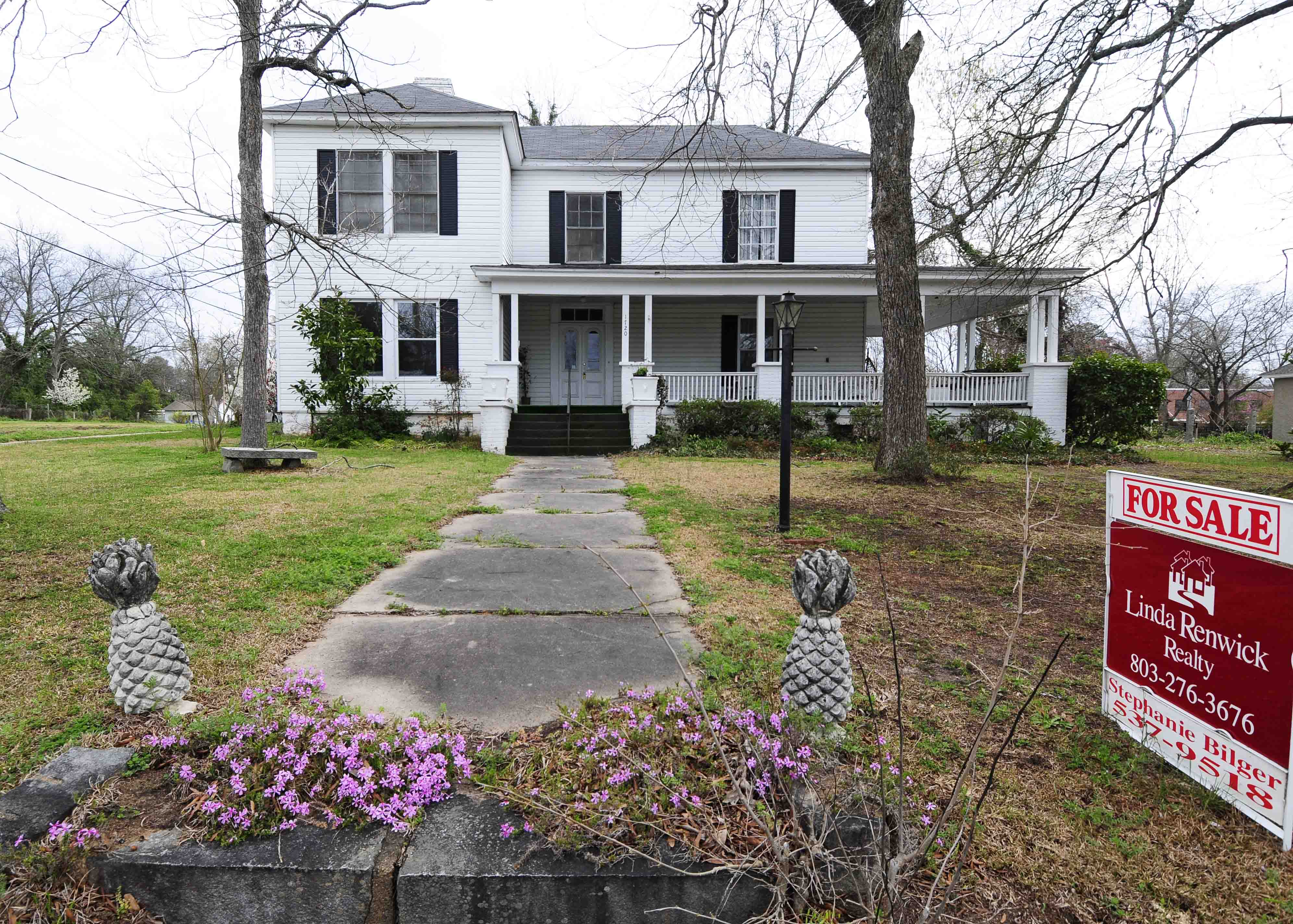

- Location within South Carolina Location within the United States
- Location: College St., Newberry, South Carolina
- Coordinates: 34°16′49″N 81°37′17″W
- Area: 15.7 acres (6.4 ha)
- Built: 1880
- Architect: Davis, C. C.
- Architectural style: Bungalow/Craftsman, Italianate
- MPS: Newberry MRA
- NRHP reference No.: 80004461
- Added to NRHP: November 26, 1980

College Street Historic District in Newberry, South Carolina, United States, is an area that was built in 1880. It was listed on the National Register of Historic Places in 1980.
