= Newberry, South Carolina =

- City
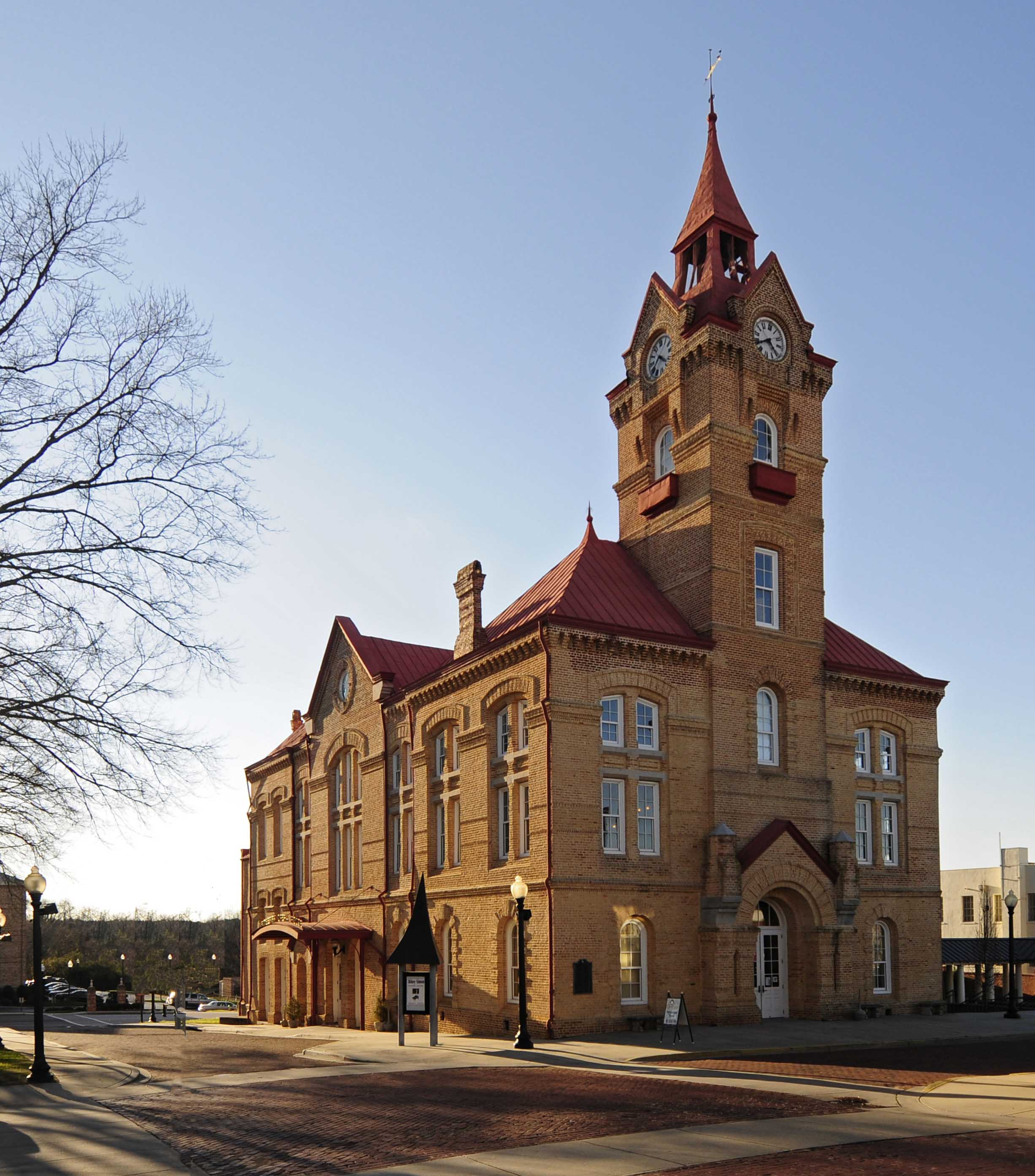
- Newberry Opera House

- Seal
- Motto: "The City of Friendly Folks."
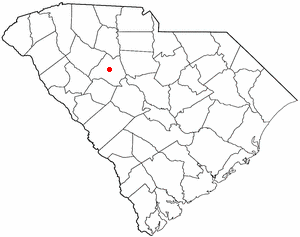
- Location of Newberry, South Carolina
- Coordinates: 34°16′40″N 81°37′00″W
- Country: United States
- State: South Carolina
- County: Newberry

Area
  - Total: 9.00 sq mi (23.30 km^{2})
  - Land: 8.99 sq mi (23.29 km^{2})
  - Water: 0.0039 sq mi (0.01 km^{2})
- Elevation: 541 ft (165 m)

Population (2020)
  - Total: 10,691
  - Density: 1,188.9/sq mi (459.04/km^{2})
- Time zone: UTC−5 (Eastern (EST))
  - Summer (DST): UTC−4 (EDT)
- ZIP code: 29108
- Area codes: 803, 839
- FIPS code: 45-49570
- GNIS feature ID: 2404369
- Website: www.cityofnewberry.com

Newberry is a city in Newberry County, South Carolina, United States, in the Piedmont 43 miles (69 kilometers) northwest of Columbia. The charter was adopted in 1894. As of the 2020 census, Newberry had a population of 10,691. It is the county seat of Newberry County; at one time it was called Newberry Courthouse.

Newberry became a city in 1976, but did not report the change to the Census Bureau for more than twenty-five years. As a result, the city was listed as a town in the 2000 census.

It is the home of Newberry College, a private liberal-arts college affiliated with the Evangelical Lutheran Church in America.

== Geography ==
According to the United States Census Bureau, the town had a total area of 6.6 square miles (17.0 km^{2}), all land.

== Demographics ==
Historical population
Census	Pop.	Note	%±
1850	509		—
1870	1,891		—
1880	2,343		23.9%
1890	3,020		28.9%
1900	4,607		52.5%
1910	5,028		9.1%
1920	5,894		17.2%
1930	7,298		23.8%
1940	7,510		2.9%
1950	7,546		0.5%
1960	8,208		8.8%
1970	9,218		12.3%
1980	9,866		7.0%
1990	10,542		6.9%
2000	10,580		0.4%
2010	10,277		−2.9%
2020	10,691		4.0%
U.S. Decennial Census

=== 2020 census ===
As of the 2020 census, there were 10,691 people, 3,980 households, and 2,233 families residing in the city. The median age was 33.8 years. 22.7% of residents were under the age of 18 and 18.3% of residents were 65 years of age or older. For every 100 females there were 84.0 males, and for every 100 females age 18 and over there were 80.6 males age 18 and over.

99.4% of residents lived in urban areas, while 0.6% lived in rural areas.

There were 3,980 households in Newberry, of which 31.4% had children under the age of 18 living in them. Of all households, 30.3% were married-couple households, 19.4% were households with a male householder and no spouse or partner present, and 45.3% were households with a female householder and no spouse or partner present. About 34.0% of all households were made up of individuals and 16.1% had someone living alone who was 65 years of age or older.

There were 4,595 housing units, of which 13.4% were vacant. The homeowner vacancy rate was 2.1% and the rental vacancy rate was 9.2%.

Racial composition as of the 2020 census
Race	Number	Percent
White	4,722	44.2%
Black or African American	4,560	42.7%
American Indian and Alaska Native	74	0.7%
Asian	81	0.8%
Native Hawaiian and Other Pacific Islander	2	0.0%
Some other race	665	6.2%
Two or more races	587	5.5%
Hispanic or Latino (of any race)	1,312	12.3%

=== 2000 census ===
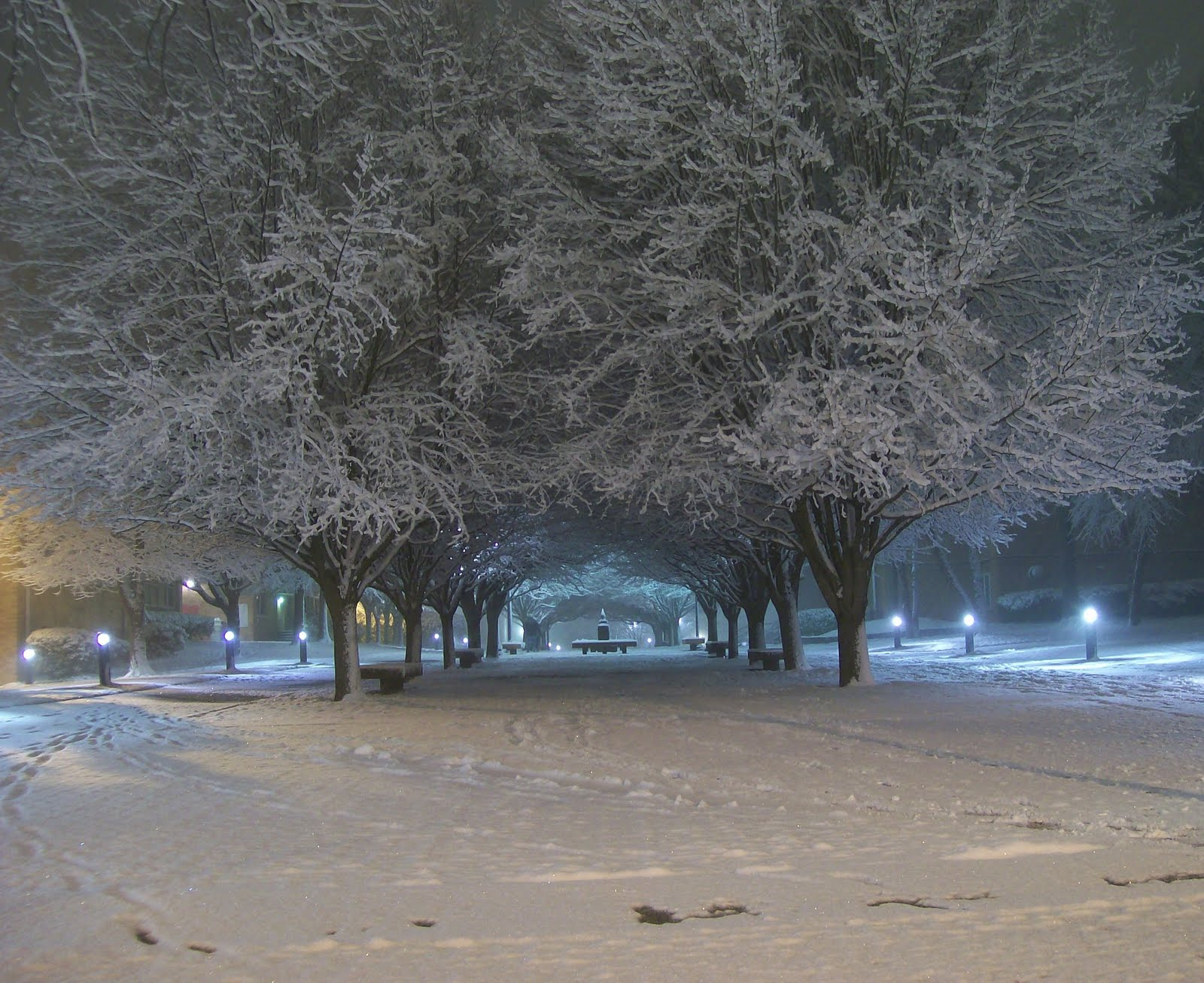
Bachman Court, Newberry College

As of the 2000 census, there were 10,580 people, 3,970 households, and 2,528 families residing in the town. The population density was 1,609.2 inhabitants per square mile (621.3/km^{2}). There were 4,388 housing units at an average density of 667.4 per square mile (257.7/km^{2}). The racial makeup of the town was 52.85% White, 41.36% African American, 0.47% Native American, 0.60% Asian, 0.12% Pacific Islander, 2.88% from other races, and 1.70% from two or more races. Hispanic or Latino of any race were 9.49% of the population.

There were 3,970 households, out of which 29.7% had children under the age of 18 living with them, 36.5% were married couples living together, 22.3% had a female householder with no husband present, and 36.3% were non-families. 31.7% of all households were made up of individuals, and 15.9% had someone living alone who was 65 years of age or older. The average household size was 2.42 and the average family size was 2.97.

In the town the population was spread out, with 23.3% under the age of 18, 14.9% from 18 to 24, 25.5% from 25 to 44, 18.6% from 45 to 64, and 17.6% who were 65 years of age or older. The median age was 34 years. For every 100 females, there were 86.3 males. For every 100 females age 18 and over, there were 81.6 males.

The median income for a household in the town was $27,064, and the median income for a family was $33,490. Males had a median income of $28,681 versus $20,887 for females. The per capita income for the town was $14,389. About 23.8% of families and 28.0% of the population were below the poverty line, including 39.9% of those under age 18 and 21.0% of those age 65 or over.

== History ==
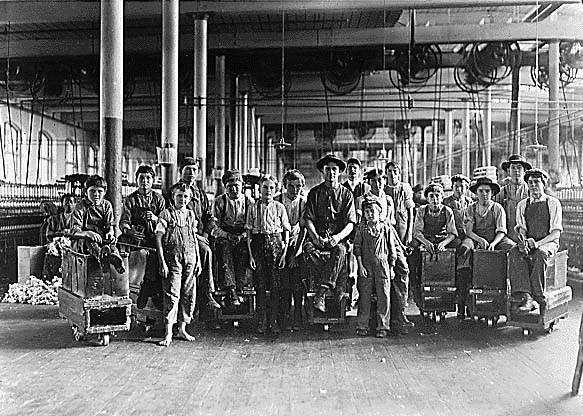
A few of the doffers and sweepers in the Mollohan Mills. December 1908. Photographed by Lewis Hine.

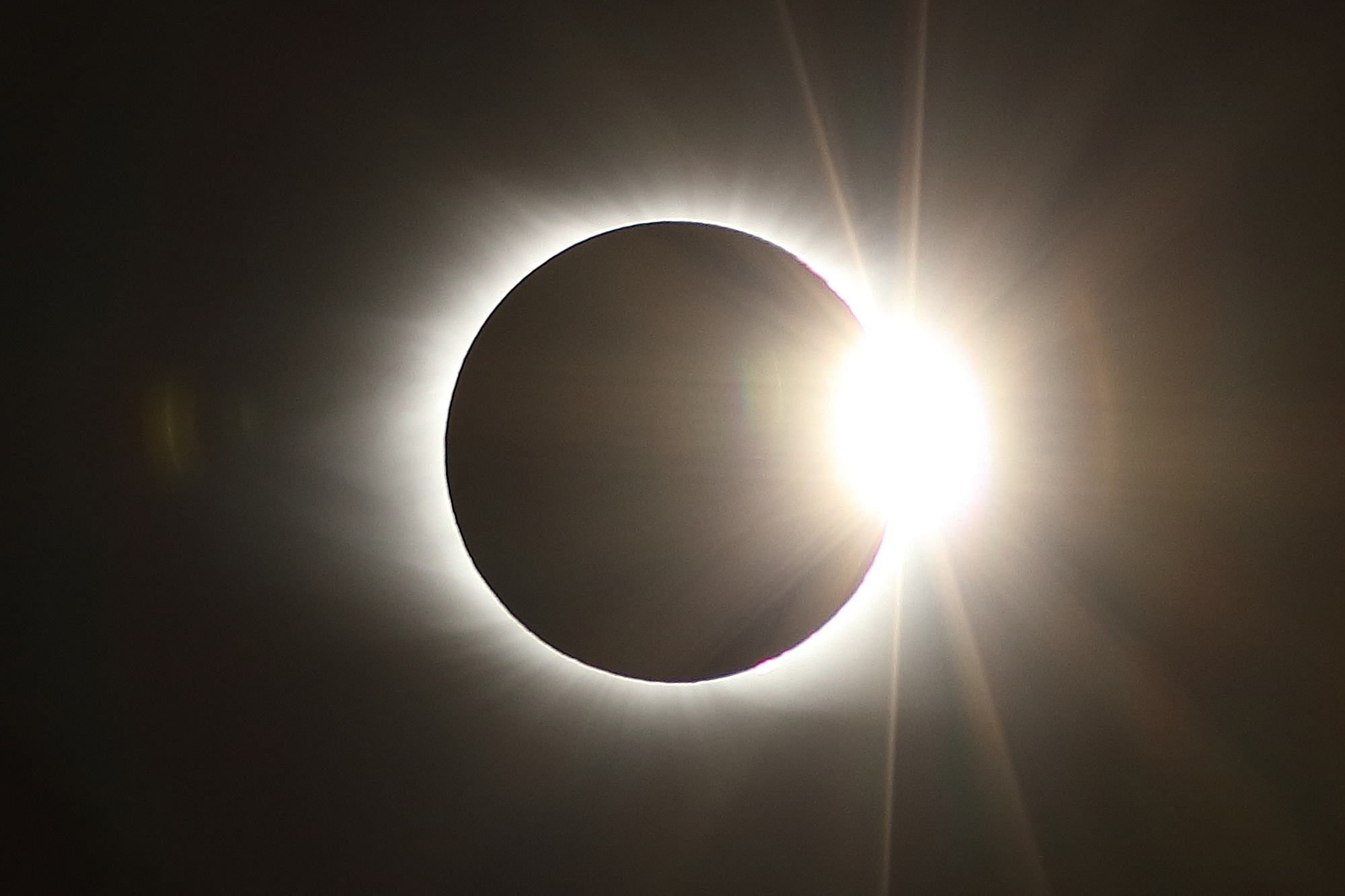
Solar eclipse of August 21, 2017 from Newberry.

European settlers (primarily German, Scots-Irish, and English) began arriving in great numbers in the 1750s. Newberry County was formed from the Ninety-Six District in 1785. Because of its central location, the town of Newberry was chosen in 1789 as the county seat for Newberry County, which was part of an extensive area of cotton plantations. County and town politics were dominated by planters. By the coming of the railroad in 1851, Newberry had become a thriving trade center. This remained the case until the 1860s.

During the American Civil War, Newberry College was used as a hospital for Confederate and later Union troops. The historic Newberry Court House was not burned by William Tecumseh Sherman's troops as he swept through the South.

Violent racial incidents hit all over the country as part of the 1919 Red Summer. On July 24, 1919, there was the attempted lynching of Elisha Harper of Newberry. Harper was sent to jail for insulting a 14-year-old girl.

=== National Register of Historic Places ===
The following buildings are listed on the National Register of Historic Places:

- Boundary Street-Newberry Cotton Mills Historic District
- Burton House, Caldwell Street Historic District
- Coateswood
- College Street Historic District
- Cousins House
- Hannah Rosenwald School
- Harrington Street Historic District
- Francis B. Higgins House
- Main Street Historic District
- George Mower House
- Newberry College Historic District
- Newberry County Memorial Hospital
- Newberry Historic District
- Newberry Opera House
- Oakland Mill
- Old Courthouse
- Ike Reighley House
- Summer Brothers Stores
- Timberhouse
- Vincent Street Historic District
- Wells Japanese Garden
- Osborne Wells House
- West Boundary Street Historic District

== Education ==
Newberry has a public library, a branch of the Newberry County Library System.

Newberry High School is located within the city.

== Notable people ==
- Coleman Livingston Blease (1868–1942), politician of the Democratic Party
- Eugene Satterwhite Blease, former Chief Justice of the South Carolina Supreme Court
- Trevor Booker (b. 1987), former professional NBA player for Washington Wizards
- Lenny Cooper (b. 1988), country rapper
- Carl "CJ" Edwards Jr. (b. 1991), professional baseball pitcher for the Washington Nationals
- Jordan Hill (b. 1987), former professional basketball player for Los Angeles Lakers
- Mickey Livingston (1914–1983), professional baseball catcher for Chicago Cubs
- Billy O'Dell (1933–2018), professional baseball player for San Francisco Giants
- Ralph Rowe (1924–1996), baseball player, manager and coach
- Richard Sligh (1944–2008), professional football player for the Oakland Raiders
- Reggie Taylor (b. 1977), professional baseball outfielder
- Henry McNeal Turner (1834–1915), bishop of the African Methodist Episcopal Church and Georgia state legislator
