= Newberry College =

Lutheran college in Newberry, South Carolina, US

- Type: Private college
- Established: 1856; 170 years ago
- Religious affiliation: Evangelical Lutheran Church in America
- Endowment: $17.3 million (2018)
- President: David Harpool
- Students: 1,521
- Location: Newberry, South Carolina, United States; 34°17′06″N 81°37′15″W
- Campus: 90 acres (36 ha)
- Nickname: Wolves
- Sporting affiliations: NCAA Division II – South Atlantic
- Website: newberry.edu

Newberry College is a private Lutheran college in Newberry, South Carolina. As of 2023, it had 1,521 students.

== Academics ==
Academic rankings

Baccalaureate
- Washington Monthly: 84 of 242

Regional
- U.S. News & World Report: 10 (tie) of 90

Newberry College is accredited by the Commission on Colleges of the Southern Association of Colleges and Schools (SACS) to award bachelor's and master's degrees.

== Athletics ==
Newberry athletic teams are the Wolves. The college is a member of the Division II level of the National Collegiate Athletic Association (NCAA), primarily competing in the South Atlantic Conference (SAC) since the 1996–97 academic year. The Wolves previously competed in the Carolinas Intercollegiate Athletic Conference (CIAC, now known as Conference Carolinas) of the National Association of Intercollegiate Athletics (NAIA) from 1961–62 to 1971–72.

As of 2023, Newberry fields 22 intercollegiate varsity sports teams, along with cheerleading and dance teams. Men's sports include baseball, basketball, cross country, football, golf, lacrosse, soccer, tennis, track & field and wrestling. Women's sports include basketball, cross country, field hockey, golf, lacrosse, rugby, soccer, softball, tennis, track & field, triathlon, and volleyball. Women's acrobatics & tumbling and women's wrestling will begin competition in the 2024-25 academic year.

== Music program ==
The music program at Newberry College has a history in vocal and instrumental performance dating back over 100 years and a jazz band and marching band in existence since 1956. In 1956, a major turning point in the school's musical history took place, when respected military band leader and alumnus Charles "Chief" Pruitt organized the jazz band and the marching band after returning to the school to teach music.

Pruitt also began the Newberry College Jazz Festival, held each spring since 1958. The festival has hosted artists including Jeff Coffin, Delfayo Marsalis, Terell Stafford, Al Chez, and others.

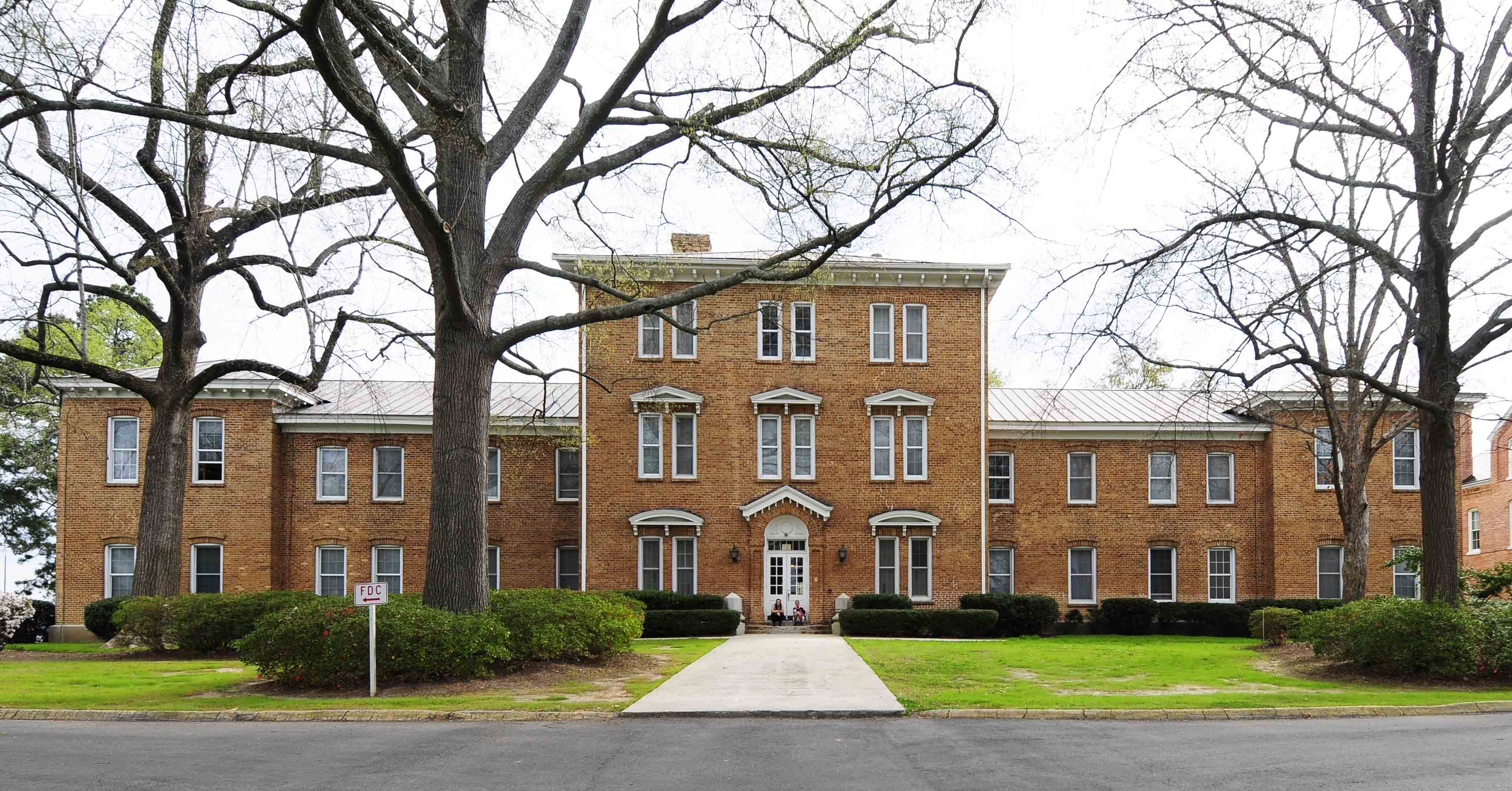
Smeltzer Hall, Newberry College Historic District

== Notable alumni ==
- Corey Anderson – mixed martial artist; Ultimate Fighter 19 winner, competing in the UFC's Light Heavyweight Division
- Kelly Anundson, MMA fighter
- Lee Atwater
- Dike Beede
- Coleman Livingston Blease
- Brandon Bostick
- Benjamin O. Burnett
- Henry L. Carroll
- Frederick H. Dominick
- Katrina Foster
- Cody Garbrandt – mixed martial artist; former UFC Bantamweight Champion
- Mark Hammond
- Butler B. Hare
- James Butler Hare
- Greg Hartle
- James Haskell Hope
- Stuart Lake
- Asbury Francis Lever
- Mike Longabardi
- Debola Ogunseye
- Ron Parker
- John H. Pitchford (1857–1923) – lawyer and politician, served on the Oklahoma Supreme Court (1921–23) and died in office
- Billy Rhiel
- Ralph Rowe
- Corey Washington
- Zack Kelly – pitcher for the Boston Red Sox

== See also ==
- Newberry College Historic District – U.S. historic district at Newberry College
