= Boundary Street–Newberry Cotton Mills Historic District =

Historic district in South Carolina, United States

- U.S. National Register of Historic Places
- U.S. Historic district
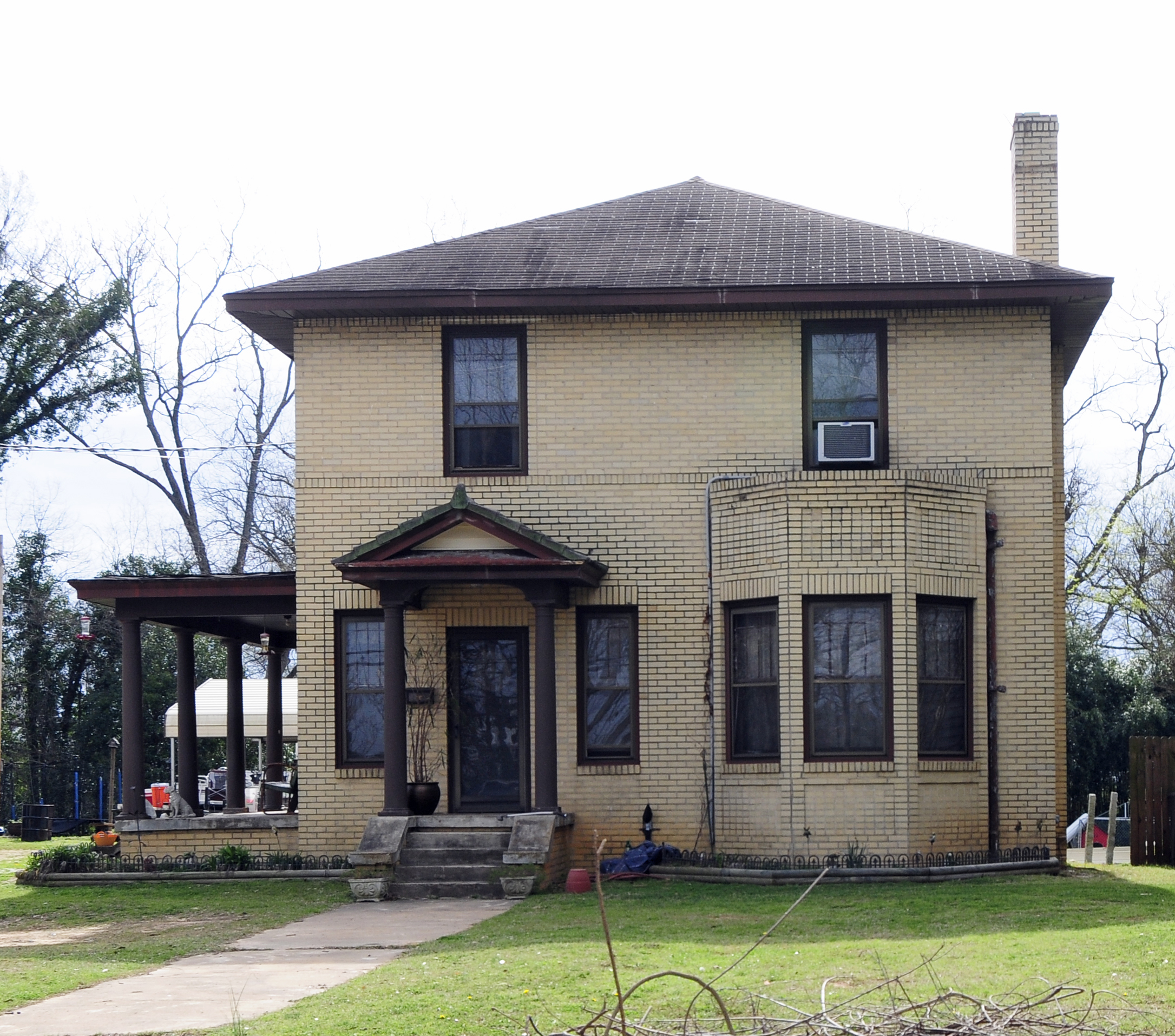
- House in the Boundary Street–Newberry Cotton Mills Historic District, March 2012

- Location within South Carolina Location within the United States
- Location: Roughly bounded by Drayton, Boundary, Charles, Terrant and Crosson Sts., Newberry, South Carolina
- Coordinates: 34°16′13″N 81°37′31″W
- Area: 60 acres (24 ha)
- Built: 1884
- Architectural style: Classical Revival, Italianate
- MPS: Newberry MRA
- NRHP reference No.: 80004465
- Added to NRHP: November 26, 1980

Boundary Street–Newberry Cotton Mills Historic District is a national historic district in Newberry, South Carolina. The district encompasses 107 buildings, 1 site, and 1 structure in Newberry. The district includes classical and vernacular inspired upper and middle-class houses dating from 1857 to 1898. It also includes a relatively intact late-19th century mill village (c. 1884–1910) that surrounded the Newberry Cotton Mill (demolished).

It was listed on the National Register of Historic Places in 1980.
