= Newberry County, South Carolina =

County in South Carolina, United States

- County
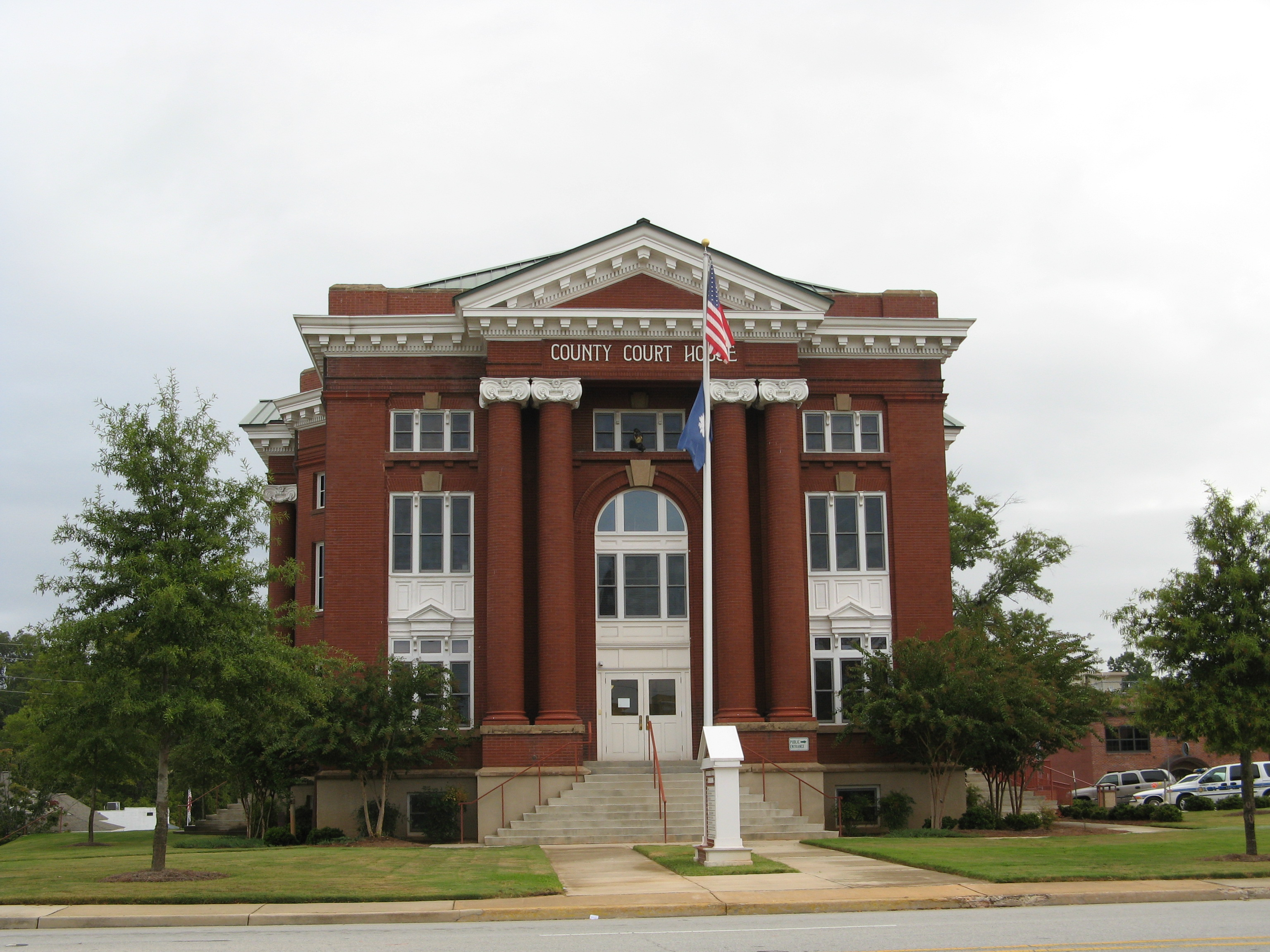
- Newberry County Courthouse

- Seal

- Location within the U.S. state of South Carolina
- Coordinates: 34.29°N 81.60°W
- Country: United States
- State: South Carolina
- Founded: 1785
- Named for: No records exist but likely named after a settler in the area or a suburb of London named Newberry.
- Seat: Newberry
- Largest community: Newberry

Area
  - Total: 647.28 sq mi (1,676.4 km^{2})
  - Land: 630.29 sq mi (1,632.4 km^{2})
  - Water: 16.99 sq mi (44.0 km^{2}) 2.62%

Population (2020)
  - Total: 37,719
  - Estimate (2025): 39,561 ▲
  - Density: 59.844/sq mi (23.106/km^{2})
- Time zone: UTC−5 (Eastern)
  - Summer (DST): UTC−4 (EDT)
- Congressional district: 3rd
- Website: www.newberrycounty.gov

Newberry County is a county located in the U.S. state of South Carolina. As of the 2020 census, its population was 37,719. Its county seat is Newberry. The name is of unknown origin, although one theory suggests that it was named by Quaker settlers in honor of their home of Newberry, a suburb of London in the United Kingdom. Newberry County comprises the Newberry, SC micropolitan statistical area.

== History ==
Newberry County was formed from Ninety-Six District in 1785. Prior to its formal founding, the area was the site of several American Revolutionary War battles: Williams' Plantation, December 31, 1780; Mud Lick, March 2, 1781; and Bush River, May 1781. The town of Newberry was founded in 1789 as the county seat and was sometimes called Newberry Courthouse for that reason.

Originally settled by yeomen farmers in the 19th century, numerous plantations were established for the cultivation of short-staple cotton. Its processing had been made profitable by invention of the cotton gin. Cotton was the primary crop grown in Newberry County before the American Civil War. Newberry was a trading town, and expanded with the arrival of the railroad in the early 1850s, which connected it to major towns and markets. Newberry College was established by the Lutheran Church in 1856.

The Civil War interrupted growth in the county; the warfare and loss of lives of many southern men disrupted the state economy. The first cotton mills were constructed in the county in the 1880s, and quickly became an important part of the economy and a source of jobs. With the mechanization of agriculture in the early 20th century, labor needs were reduced.

Since the 1960s, the population of Newberry County has grown from 29,416 in 1960 to 37,719 in 2020.

== Geography ==
Interactive map of Newberry County

According to the U.S. Census Bureau, the county has a total area of 647.28 square miles (1,676.4 km^{2}), of which 16.99 square miles (44.0 km^{2}) (2.62%) are covered by water.

=== National protected area ===
- Belfast Wildlife Management Area (part)
- Sumter National Forest (part)

=== State and local protected areas ===
- Belfast Wildlife Management Area
- Broad River Scenic Area
- Dreher Island State Park
- Rocky Branch Natural Area

=== Major water bodies ===
- Broad River
- Bush River
- Camping Creek
- Cannon's Creek
- Enoree River
- Lake Murray
- Parr Shoals Reservoir
- Saluda River

=== Adjacent counties ===
- Union County – north
- Fairfield County – east
- Lexington County – southeast
- Richland County – southeast
- Saluda County – south
- Greenwood County – southwest
- Laurens County – northwest

=== Major highways ===
- I-26
- US 76
- US 176
- US 176 Conn.
- SC 34
- SC 34 Conn.
- SC 39
- SC 56
- SC 66
- SC 72
- SC 72 Conn.
- SC 121
- SC 202
- SC 213
- SC 219
- SC 391
- SC 395
- SC 560

=== Major infrastructure ===
- Newberry County Water & Sewer Authority
- Newberry Electric Cooperative
- Clinton-Newberry Natural Gas Authority

== Demographics ==
Historical population
Census	Pop.	Note	%±
1790	9,342		—
1800	12,006		28.5%
1810	13,964		16.3%
1820	16,104		15.3%
1830	17,441		8.3%
1840	18,350		5.2%
1850	20,143		9.8%
1860	20,879		3.7%
1870	20,775		−0.5%
1880	26,497		27.5%
1890	26,434		−0.2%
1900	30,182		14.2%
1910	34,586		14.6%
1920	35,552		2.8%
1930	34,681		−2.4%
1940	33,577		−3.2%
1950	31,771		−5.4%
1960	29,416		−7.4%
1970	29,273		−0.5%
1980	31,242		6.7%
1990	33,172		6.2%
2000	36,108		8.9%
2010	37,508		3.9%
2020	37,719		0.6%
2025 (est.)	39,561	▲	4.9%
U.S. Decennial Census; 1790–1960 1900–1990; 1990–2000 2010 2020

=== Racial and ethnic composition ===
Newberry County, South Carolina – Racial and ethnic composition Note: the US Census treats Hispanic/Latino as an ethnic category. This table excludes Latinos from the racial categories and assigns them to a separate category. Hispanics/Latinos may be of any race.
Race / Ethnicity (NH = Non-Hispanic)	Pop 1980	Pop 1990	Pop 2000	Pop 2010	Pop 2020	% 1980	% 1990	% 2000	% 2010	% 2020
White alone (NH)	21,194	21,426	22,270	22,690	22,635	67.84%	64.59%	61.68%	60.49%	60.01%
Black or African American alone (NH)	9,789	11,470	11,893	11,533	10,360	31.33%	34.58%	32.94%	30.75%	27.47%
Native American or Alaska Native alone (NH)	18	40	73	99	107	0.06%	0.12%	0.20%	0.26%	0.28%
Asian alone (NH)	43	79	92	116	135	0.14%	0.24%	0.25%	0.31%	0.36%
Native Hawaiian or Pacific Islander alone (NH)	x	x	19	10	4	x	x	0.05%	0.03%	0.01%
Other race alone (NH)	11	10	32	36	72	0.04%	0.03%	0.09%	0.10%	0.19%
Mixed race or Multiracial (NH)	x	x	196	334	1,101	x	x	0.54%	0.89%	2.92%
Hispanic or Latino (any race)	187	147	1,533	2,690	3,305	0.60%	0.44%	4.25%	7.17%	8.76%
Total	31,242	33,172	36,108	37,508	37,719	100.00%	100.00%	100.00%	100.00%	100.00%

=== 2020 census ===
As of the 2020 census, there were 37,719 people, 15,039 households, and 9,705 families residing in the county. The median age was 43.1 years; 21.2% of residents were under the age of 18 and 21.3% of residents were 65 years of age or older. For every 100 females there were 94.0 males, and for every 100 females age 18 and over there were 91.4 males age 18 and over.

The racial makeup of the county was 61.7% White, 27.7% Black or African American, 0.6% American Indian and Alaska Native, 0.4% Asian, 0.0% Native Hawaiian and Pacific Islander, 4.8% from some other race, and 4.8% from two or more races. Hispanic or Latino residents of any race comprised 8.8% of the population.

32.7% of residents lived in urban areas, while 67.3% lived in rural areas.

There were 15,039 households in the county, of which 28.3% had children under the age of 18 living with them and 31.1% had a female householder with no spouse or partner present. About 28.6% of all households were made up of individuals and 14.1% had someone living alone who was 65 years of age or older.

There were 18,213 housing units, of which 17.4% were vacant. Among occupied housing units, 72.9% were owner-occupied and 27.1% were renter-occupied. The homeowner vacancy rate was 1.4% and the rental vacancy rate was 8.3%.

=== 2010 census ===
At the 2010 census, there were 37,508 people, 14,709 households, and 10,129 families living in the county. The population density was 59.5 inhabitants per square mile (23.0/km^{2}). There were 17,922 housing units at an average density of 28.4 per square mile (11.0/km^{2}). The racial makeup of the county was 62.1% white, 31.0% black or African American, 0.3% Asian, 0.3% American Indian, 0.1% Pacific islander, 5.0% from other races, and 1.2% from two or more races. Those of Hispanic or Latino origin made up 7.2% of the population. In terms of ancestry, 16.8% were German, 14.2% were American, 9.0% were English, and 7.7% were Irish.

Of the 14,709 households, 32.1% had children under the age of 18 living with them, 46.3% were married couples living together, 17.2% had a female householder with no husband present, 31.1% were non-families, and 27.0% of all households were made up of individuals. The average household size was 2.47 and the average family size was 2.97. The median age was 39.9 years.

The median income for a household in the county was $41,815 and the median income for a family was $49,560. Males had a median income of $38,146 versus $28,961 for females. The per capita income for the county was $21,410. About 13.3% of families and 16.6% of the population were below the poverty line, including 25.6% of those under age 18 and 10.9% of those age 65 or over.

=== 2000 census ===
At the 2000 census, there were 36,108 people, 14,026 households and 9,804 families living in the county. The population density was 57 people per square mile (22 people/km^{2}). There were 16,805 housing units at an average density of 27 per square mile (10/km^{2}). The racial makeup of the county was 64.02 percent White, 33.12 percent Black or African American, 0.28 percent Native American, 0.29 percent Asian, 0.09 percent Pacific Islander, 1.30 percent from other races, and 0.90 percent from two or more races. Some 4.25 percent of the population were Hispanic or Latino of any race.

There were 14,026 households, out of which 30.4 percent had children under the age of 18 living with them, 49.2 percent were married couples living together, 16.1 percent had a female householder with no husband present, and 30.1 percent were non-families. 26.5 percent of all households were made up of individuals, and 12 percent had someone living alone who was 65 years of age or older. The average household size was 2.5 and the average family size was 2.99.

In the county, the population was spread out, with 24.1 percent under the age of 18, 9.8 percent from 18 to 24, 27.6 percent from 25 to 44, 23.7 percent from 45 to 64, and 14.7 percent who were 65 years of age or older. The median age was 37 years. For every 100 females there were 93.20 males. For every 100 females age 18 and over, there were 89.8 males.

The median income for a household in the county was $32,867, and the median income for a family was $40,580. Males had a median income of $29,871 versus $21,274 for females. The per capita income for the county was $16,045. About 13.6 percent of families and 17 percent of the population were below the poverty line, including 23.8 percent of those under age 18 and 16 percent of those age 65 or over.

== Government and politics ==
Newberry County has served as a reliable bellwether for South Carolina through the 20th century, having voted for the statewide presidential winner in 17 straight elections since 1956. In the 21st Century, the county has become reliably Republican. The 2024 election, in which the county shifted to the right by over 5 points, displayed the strongest Republican support in the county since Nixon's 1972 landslide.

United States presidential election results for Newberry County, South Carolina
Year	Republican		Democratic		Third party(ies)	
Year	No.	%	No.	%	No.	%
1900	40	2.84%	1,367	97.16%	0	0.00%
1904	33	2.36%	1,364	97.64%	0	0.00%
1912	6	0.49%	1,206	98.05%	18	1.46%
1916	19	1.07%	1,719	97.17%	31	1.75%
1920	33	1.60%	2,015	97.91%	10	0.49%
1924	13	0.72%	1,802	99.17%	2	0.11%
1928	12	0.57%	2,077	99.19%	5	0.24%
1932	12	0.38%	3,139	99.62%	0	0.00%
1936	9	0.34%	2,615	99.66%	0	0.00%
1940	35	1.97%	1,739	98.03%	0	0.00%
1944	70	2.99%	1,940	82.80%	333	14.21%
1948	47	1.49%	349	11.04%	2,765	87.47%
1952	4,126	54.69%	3,418	45.31%	0	0.00%
1956	1,061	20.68%	2,671	52.07%	1,398	27.25%
1960	2,841	47.48%	3,143	52.52%	0	0.00%
1964	5,571	63.35%	3,222	36.64%	1	0.01%
1968	4,538	42.35%	2,444	22.81%	3,734	34.85%
1972	7,325	76.94%	2,035	21.37%	161	1.69%
1976	4,931	49.23%	5,034	50.26%	51	0.51%
1980	5,568	52.96%	4,825	45.90%	120	1.14%
1984	7,176	65.19%	3,790	34.43%	42	0.38%
1988	6,427	62.37%	3,825	37.12%	53	0.51%
1992	5,980	48.50%	4,896	39.71%	1,453	11.79%
1996	5,670	50.48%	4,804	42.77%	758	6.75%
2000	7,492	60.56%	4,428	35.79%	452	3.65%
2004	7,654	61.68%	4,483	36.13%	272	2.19%
2008	9,616	58.19%	6,708	40.60%	200	1.21%
2012	9,260	56.63%	6,913	42.28%	178	1.09%
2016	10,017	59.60%	6,217	36.99%	573	3.41%
2020	11,443	61.42%	6,958	37.35%	230	1.23%
2024	12,067	66.56%	5,841	32.22%	221	1.22%

== Economy ==
In 2022, the GDP was $1.8 billion (about $45,435 per capita), and the real GDP was $1.5 billion (about $37,540 per capita) in chained 2017 dollars.

As of April 2024, some of the largest employers in the county include Caterpillar Inc., Georgia-Pacific, Komatsu Limited, Kraft Foods, Newberry College, Samsung Electronics, Valmont Industries, and Walmart.

Employment and Wage Statistics by Industry in Newberry County, South Carolina - Q3 2023
Industry	Employment Counts	Employment Percentage (%)	Average Annual Wage ($)
Accommodation and Food Services	1,120	7.6	18,980
Administrative and Support and Waste Management and Remediation Services	787	5.4	33,800
Agriculture, Forestry, Fishing and Hunting	474	3.2	45,032
Arts, Entertainment, and Recreation	166	1.1	13,572
Construction	773	5.3	58,708
Educational Services	1,178	8.0	46,332
Finance and Insurance	201	1.4	43,316
Health Care and Social Assistance	1,484	10.1	39,156
Information	42	0.3	64,064
Manufacturing	5,019	34.2	58,188
Other Services (except Public Administration)	246	1.7	46,176
Professional, Scientific, and Technical Services	171	1.2	42,588
Public Administration	786	5.4	48,464
Real Estate and Rental and Leasing	78	0.5	52,936
Retail Trade	1,477	10.1	28,600
Transportation and Warehousing	280	1.9	56,004
Utilities	73	0.5	65,572
Wholesale Trade	315	2.1	66,924
Total	14,670	100.0%	46,191

== Media ==
Newberry Magazine is a bimonthly magazine, published since 2004, by Summer Media, for Newberry County.

== Communities ==
=== Cities ===
- Newberry (county seat and largest community)

=== Towns ===
- Little Mountain
- Peak
- Pomaria
- Prosperity
- Silverstreet
- Whitmire

=== Census-designated place ===
- Helena

=== Other unincorporated communities ===
- Chappells
- Stoney Hill
- Jalapa
- Kinards (partly in Laurens County)

== Notable people ==
- Lee Atwater (1951–1991), political consultant
- Pinckney Warren Russell (1864–1941), classics scholar, educator, pastor

== See also ==
- List of counties in South Carolina
- National Register of Historic Places listings in Newberry County, South Carolina
- Red Knoll School House
