= National Register of Historic Places listings in Saluda County, South Carolina =

Location of Saluda County in South Carolina

This is a list of the National Register of Historic Places listings in Saluda County, South Carolina.

This is intended to be a complete list of the properties and districts on the National Register of Historic Places in Saluda County, South Carolina, United States. The locations of National Register properties and districts for which the latitude and longitude coordinates are included below, may be seen in a map.

Eleven properties and districts are listed on the National Register in the county.

This National Park Service list is complete through NPS recent listings posted March 21, 2025.

== Current listings ==
	Name on the Register	Image	Date listed	Location	City or town	Description
1	Bonham House	Bonham House	December 30, 1974 (#74001875)	Southeast of Saluda off U.S. Route 178; 34°00′29″N 81°41′53″W	Saluda	
2	Butler Family Cemetery	Butler Family Cemetery	December 31, 1974 (#74001874)	Northeast of Saluda off South Carolina Highway 194; 34°03′56″N 81°43′33″W	Saluda	
3	Marsh-Johnson House	Marsh-Johnson House	June 17, 1982 (#82003904)	Intersection of S-41-21 and S-41-37; 33°54′25″N 81°49′48″W	Saluda	
4	Old Strother Place	Old Strother Place	February 25, 1994 (#94000063)	Eastern side of Fruit Hill Rd., 0.3 miles north of the junction with Chappells Ferry Rd. 33°56′59″N 81°51′22″W	Saluda	
5	Ridge Hill High School	Ridge Hill High School	June 9, 2010 (#10000341)	206 Ridge Hill Dr. 33°51′12″N 81°39′25″W	Ridge Spring	
6	Saluda Old Town Site		June 28, 1972 (#72001223)	Address Restricted	Saluda	
7	Saluda Theatre	Saluda Theatre	December 13, 1993 (#93001406)	107 Law Range; 34°00′04″N 81°46′16″W	Saluda	
8	Spann Methodist Church and Cemetery	Spann Methodist Church and Cemetery	October 18, 2003 (#03001059)	150 Church St. 33°51′24″N 81°43′40″W	Ward	
9	Stevens-Dorn Farmstead	Stevens-Dorn Farmstead	July 25, 1997 (#97000778)	County Road 156, 0.5 miles south of its junction with U.S. Route 178; 34°01′11″N 81°53′39″W	Saluda	
10	Webb-Coleman House	Webb-Coleman House	April 24, 1992 (#92000365)	2 miles south of Chappells, 0.3 miles east of South Carolina Highway 39, at the junction of three dirt roads 34°08′54″N 81°50′37″W	Chappells	
11	Whitehall	Whitehall	August 21, 1980 (#80003697)	Etheredge Rd. 33°59′34″N 81°46′08″W	Saluda	

== See also ==
- List of National Historic Landmarks in South Carolina
- National Register of Historic Places listings in South Carolina
