= William Butler (1759–1821) =

American politician

Member of the U.S. House of Representatives from South Carolina
- In office March 4, 1801 – March 3, 1813
- Preceded by: Robert Goodloe Harper
- Succeeded by: William Lowndes
- Constituency: 5th district (1801–1803); 2nd district (1803–1813)

Member of the South Carolina House of Representatives
- In office January 3, 1791 – December 19, 1795
- Constituency: Edgefield County
- In office January 1, 1787 – January 20, 1790
- Constituency: St. Mark's Parish

Personal details
- Born: December 17, 1759 Prince William County, Virginia Colony, British America
- Died: November 15, 1821 (aged 61) Edgefield County, South Carolina, U.S. (now Saluda County)
- Party: Democratic-Republican
- Profession: planter, soldier

Military service
- Allegiance: United States
- Branch/service: South Carolina Militia
- Years of service: 1775–1814
- Rank: Major General
- Commands: South Carolina Militia
- Battles/wars: American Revolutionary War; Second Cherokee War; War of 1812

William Butler (December 17, 1759 – November 15, 1821) was an American soldier, planter, slaveholder and United States representative from South Carolina.

== Life and career ==
Coat of Arms of William Butler

Born in Prince William County in the Colony of Virginia, he moved to South Carolina as a young man. He served in the Snow Campaign under Colonel Richard Richardson in 1775 and in Gen. Andrew Williamson's expedition against the Cherokee Indians in 1776. In 1779 he was a lieutenant in Pulaski's Legion, under Gen. Benjamin Lincoln, and served under Gen. Andrew Pickens at the siege of Augusta in 1780. He served as captain under General William Henderson in 1781, and was a captain of Mounted Rangers under Pickens in 1782.

Butler was a member of the State convention which adopted the United States Constitution, and was a member of the South Carolina House of Representatives from 1787 to 1795. He was sheriff of the Ninety-Six District in 1791, and was elected major general of the upper division of State militia in 1796.

Butler was elected as a Democratic-Republican to the 7th United States Congress and served in the five succeeding Congresses, from March 4, 1801 to March 3, 1813. He then chose not to run for reelection.

Butler was a major general commanding the troops raised for the defense of South Carolina in the War of 1812, and then retired to his plantation, plantation on the Saluda River, near Mount Willing, South Carolina.

He died at his plantation in 1821 at the age of 61, and was buried in the Butler Family Cemetery at Butler Methodist Church, near Saluda.

William Butler was the father of William Butler (1790–1850), Andrew Pickens Butler, and Pierce Mason Butler, and the grandfather of Matthew Calbraith Butler. All except Pierce Butler (who served as governor of South Carolina) were members of the U.S. Congress from South Carolina. Butler was a first cousin to Sophia Butler (Smith) Bonham, the mother of James Butler Bonham, who was killed at the Battle of the Alamo and U.S. Congressman Milledge Luke Bonham.

U.S. House of Representatives
Preceded by Robert Goodloe Harper	Member of the U.S. House of Representatives from South Carolina's 5th congressional district March 4, 1801 – March 4, 1803	Succeeded by Richard Winn
Preceded by John Rutledge, Jr.	Member of the U.S. House of Representatives from South Carolina's 2nd congressional district March 4, 1803 – March 4, 1813	Succeeded by William Lowndes
