= William Butler (1790–1850) =

American politician

Member of the U.S. House of Representatives from South Carolina's 6th district
- In office March 4, 1841 – March 3, 1843
- Preceded by: Waddy Thompson Jr.
- Succeeded by: Isaac E. Holmes

Personal details
- Born: February 1, 1790 Edgefield District, South Carolina, US
- Died: September 25, 1850 (aged 60) Fort Gibson, Indian Territory, US
- Resting place: Van Buren, Arkansas, US
- Party: Whig
- Spouse: Jane Tweedy Perry (m. 1819)
- Relations: Andrew Butler (brother); Pierce Mason Butler (brother)
- Children: Matthew Calbraith Butler
- Parent(s): William Butler; Behethland Moore Butler
- Education: South Carolina College
- Profession: Doctor, Indian agent

Military service
- Branch/service: United States Navy
- Years of service: 1814–1820
- Rank: Surgeon
- Battles/wars: War of 1812

William Butler Jr. (February 1, 1790 – September 25, 1850) was an American medical doctor, slaveholder, and United States representative from South Carolina. He was a son of William Butler (1759–1821), brother of Andrew Butler, and father of Matthew Calbraith Butler, all of whom served in the United States Congress.

== Early life ==
Butler was born near the present town of Saluda, South Carolina on February 1, 1790. He was a son of William Butler (1759–1821) and Behethland Foote (née Moore) Butler (1764–1853). Among his siblings was brother Andrew Butler, a Democratic U.S. Senator from South Carolina. Pierce Mason Butler was Governor of South Carolina from 1836 to 1838.

He graduated from South Carolina College at Columbia, South Carolina in 1810. He had studied medicine and was licensed to practice.

== Career ==
During the War of 1812, he served as a United States Navy surgeon at the Battle of New Orleans. Butler served in the Navy until June 6, 1820, when he resigned.

In 1825, he moved to Greenville, South Carolina where he began practice as a country doctor. He was elected as a Whig to the Twenty-seventh Congress (March 4, 1841 – March 3, 1843). He served as agent of the Cherokee Indians from May 29, 1849, until his death the following year.

== Personal life ==
While stationed in Rhode Island in 1819, he married Jane Tweedy Perry. She was a daughter of Christopher Raymond Perry, and was a sister to Oliver Hazard Perry and Matthew Calbraith Perry. Together, they were the parents of many children, including Matthew Calbraith Butler.

Butler died in Fort Gibson, Indian Territory (now Oklahoma) on September 25, 1850. He was buried near Van Buren, Arkansas.

U.S. House of Representatives
Preceded by Waddy Thompson, Jr.	Member of the U.S. House of Representatives from South Carolina's 6th congressional district 1841–1843	Succeeded by Isaac E. Holmes
