= Celestia, South Carolina =

- Ghost town
- Location within South Carolina
- Coordinates: 34°00′21″N 81°57′24″W
- Country: United States
- State: South Carolina
- County: Saluda
- Elevation: 492 ft (150 m)
- GNIS feature ID: 1232548

Celestia is a ghost town in Saluda County, South Carolina, United States. Celestia was 10.6 miles (17.1 km) west of Saluda. Celestia appeared on Soil Conservation Service maps as late as 1909.
