= Rudolph Mitchell =

American politician (1926–2019)

Member of the South Carolina House of Representatives for Saluda County
- In office January 1, 1963 – July 1, 1973

Personal details
- Born: September 6, 1926 Saluda, South Carolina
- Died: January 29, 2019 (aged 92) Saluda, South Carolina
- Party: Democratic
- Children: Randy Mitchell & Molly Mitchell Spearman
- Occupation: Dairy Farmer

Rudolph Mitchell (September 6, 1926 - January 29, 2019) was an American politician in the state of South Carolina. He served in the South Carolina House of Representatives as a member of the Democratic Party from 1963 to 1973, representing Saluda County, South Carolina. He was also a dairy farmer and with his brother Frank, established Rudanks Farms – a prize-winning Guernsey Dairy herd. He also served on the South Carolina Public Service Commission from 1973 to 1998. He received the “Order of the Palmetto” from Governor David Beasley, was named Saluda County Citizen of the Year, and was inducted into the SC Dairy Hall of Fame at Clemson University. He is the father of current South Carolina Superintendent of Education Molly Mitchell Spearman.
