= Pierce Mason Butler =

American politician

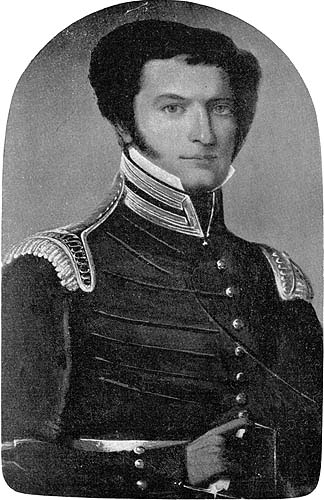
- Portrait of Colonel Pierce Mason Butler made during the 1840s

56th Governor of South Carolina
- In office December 1, 1836 – December 10, 1838
- Lieutenant: William DuBose
- Preceded by: George McDuffie
- Succeeded by: Patrick Noble

Personal details
- Born: April 11, 1798 Edgefield County, South Carolina, US
- Died: August 20, 1847 (aged 49) Mexico City, Mexico
- Resting place: Christ Episcopal Church, Greenville, South Carolina
- Party: Democratic
- Spouse: Miranda Julia Duval
- Relatives: James C. Gardner (descendant)

Military service
- Allegiance: United States
- Branch/service: United States Army; South Carolina militia
- Years of service: 1818–1829, 1838–1847
- Rank: Colonel
- Commands: Palmetto Regiment
- Battles/wars: Mexican–American War: Battle of Churubusco †

Pierce Mason Butler (April 11, 1798 – August 20, 1847) was an American soldier and statesman who served as the 56th governor of South Carolina from 1836 to 1838. He was killed while serving as colonel of the Palmetto Regiment at the Battle of Churubusco, during the Mexican–American War.

== Early life and family ==
Born in Edgefield County, South Carolina, Butler was a son of William Butler and a brother of Andrew Pickens Butler and William Butler Jr., all of whom served in the United States Congress. He was educated by Moses Waddel at the Willington Academy in Willington, South Carolina. He owned a 154-acre plantation with 27 slaves.

== Military service ==
Butler was appointed a second lieutenant in the United States Army in 1818 and rose to the rank of captain before resigning his commission in 1829. Following his term as Governor of South Carolina, he became agent to the Cherokee at Fort Gibson (present day Muskogee County, Oklahoma), a post he held until 1846.

== Burial ==
Following his death in Mexico, Butler's body was returned to South Carolina for burial. He was first entombed at Trinity Episcopal Church, just across from the State House. In December 1853 he was reburied in the Butler Family Cemetery, in the graveyard of what is now the Butler Methodist Church in Saluda County. Others buried in the plot are his father, Major General William Butler, his mother, Behethland Foote Moore Butler, a sister, five of his six brothers, Colonel Zachariah Smith Brooks, grandfather of Preston Brooks, and two children of his brother William, the only sibling not buried there. He is buried at Christ Episcopal Church in Greenville. Collectively they were four Colonels, one General, one Lt. Colonel, three Majors, and one Judge and US Senator. The General was a member of Congress, too.

== Descendants ==
James C. Gardner, who served from 1954 to 1958 as the mayor of Shreveport, Louisiana, is a descendant of Pierce Mason Butler.

== See also ==
- Christopher Werner, maker of the "Iron Palmetto" commemorating the loss of South Carolinians in the War

Political offices
Preceded by George McDuffie	Governor of South Carolina; 1836–1838	Succeeded by Patrick Noble
