= South Carolina Highway 395 =

State highway in South Carolina, United States

South Carolina Highway 395

Route information
- Maintained by SCDOT
- Length: 15.140 mi (24.365 km)

Major junctions
- West end: SC 194 near Saluda
- SC 34 in Newberry
- East end: SC 121 in Newberry

Location
- Country: United States
- State: South Carolina
- Counties: Saluda, Newberry

Highway system
- South Carolina State Highway System; Interstate; US; State; Scenic
← SC 394	→ SC 400

South Carolina Highway 395 (SC 395) is a 15.140-mile-long (24.365 km) state highway in the U.S. state of South Carolina. The highway connects the Lake Murray area with Newberry.

== Route description ==
SC 395 begins at an intersection with SC 194 (Denny Highway) at a point northeast of Saluda and west of Lake Murray, within northeastern Saluda County. From this intersection, the roadway continues southeast as Sports Road. SC 395 travels to the north and curves to the northeast before crossing the Saluda River, where it enters Newberry County. It travels in a northerly direction and curves to the north-northeast. The highway crosses over the Bush River. Then, it crosses Scott Creek, passes Gallman Elementary School, and curves to the northwest before it enters the city limits of Newberry. The highway intersects SC 34 (Dixie Drive). In town, it crosses railroad tracks, passes Margaret Hunter Park, and crosses the same railroad tracks again. On the northwestern edge of Newberry, it meets its northern terminus, an intersection with SC 121 (Kendall Road). This intersection is just southwest of Marion Davis Park.

== Major intersections ==
County	Location	mi	km	Destinations	Notes
Saluda		0.000	0.000	SC 194 (Denny Highway) – Saluda	
Newberry	Newberry	12.620	20.310	SC 34 (Dixie Drive) – Greenwood, Winnsboro	
Newberry	Newberry	15.140	24.365	SC 121 (Kendall Road) – Saluda, Whitmire	
1.000 mi = 1.609 km; 1.000 km = 0.621 mi
