= Old Strother Place =

Historic house in South Carolina, United States

- U.S. National Register of Historic Places
- U.S. Historic district
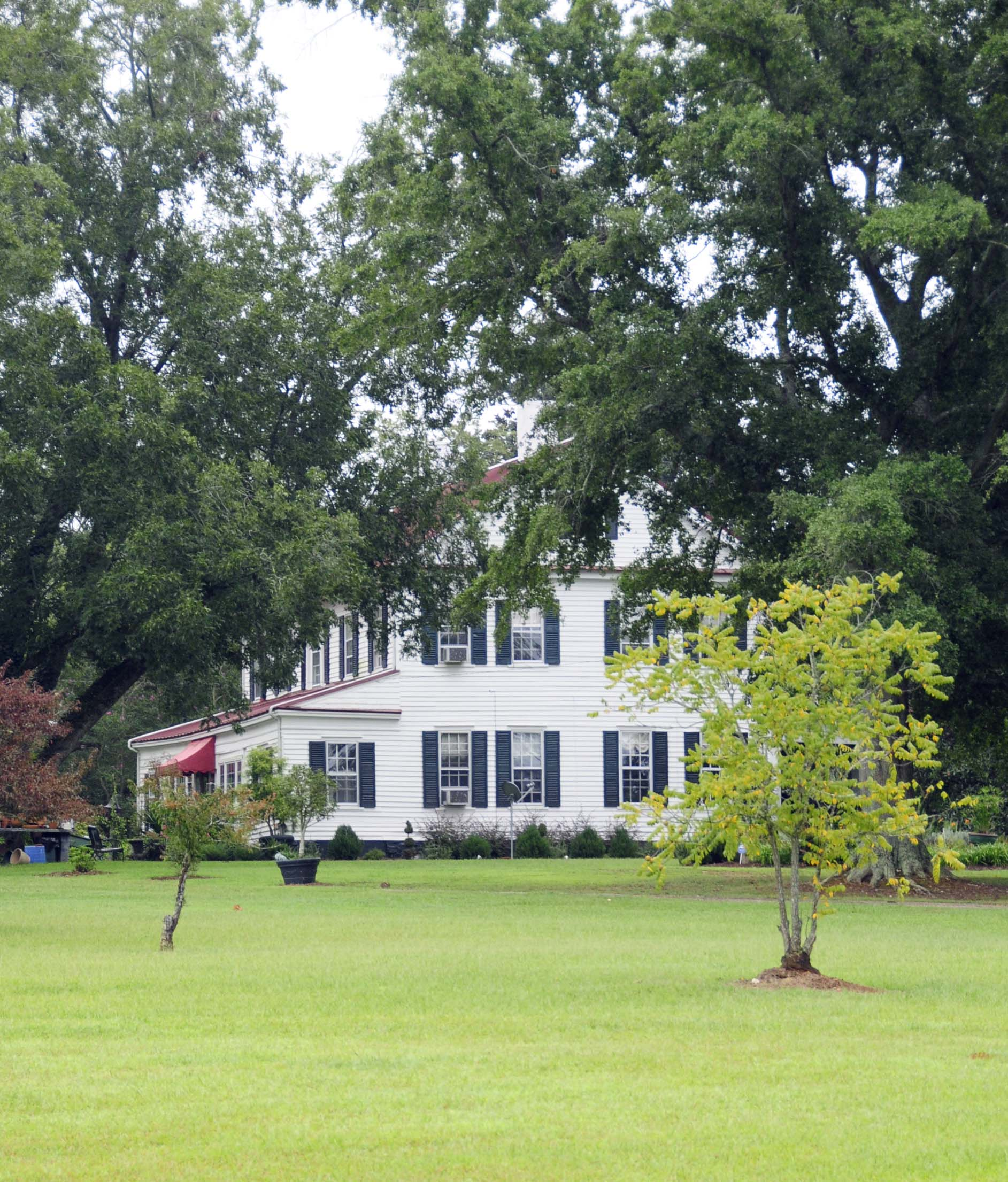
- Old Strother Place, August 2012

- Location within South Carolina Location within the United States
- Location: Eastern side of Fruit Hill Rd., 0.3 miles north of the junction with Chappells Ferry Rd., near Saluda, South Carolina
- Coordinates: 33°56′59″N 81°51′22″W
- Area: 12 acres (4.9 ha)
- Built: c. 1856, c. 1930, c. 1936
- Built by: George James Strother
- Architectural style: Greek Revival
- NRHP reference No.: 94000063
- Added to NRHP: February 25, 1994

Old Strother Place, also known as Fruit Hill, is a historic plantation home and national historic district located near Saluda, Saluda County, South Carolina. It was built about 1856, and is a two-story, frame vernacular Greek Revival style farmhouse. Also on the property are a contributing barn and kitchen building (c. 1856), garage (c. 1930), and water tower (c. 1936).

It was added to the National Register of Historic Places in 1994.
