= Stevens–Dorn Farmstead =

Historic house in South Carolina, United States

- U.S. National Register of Historic Places
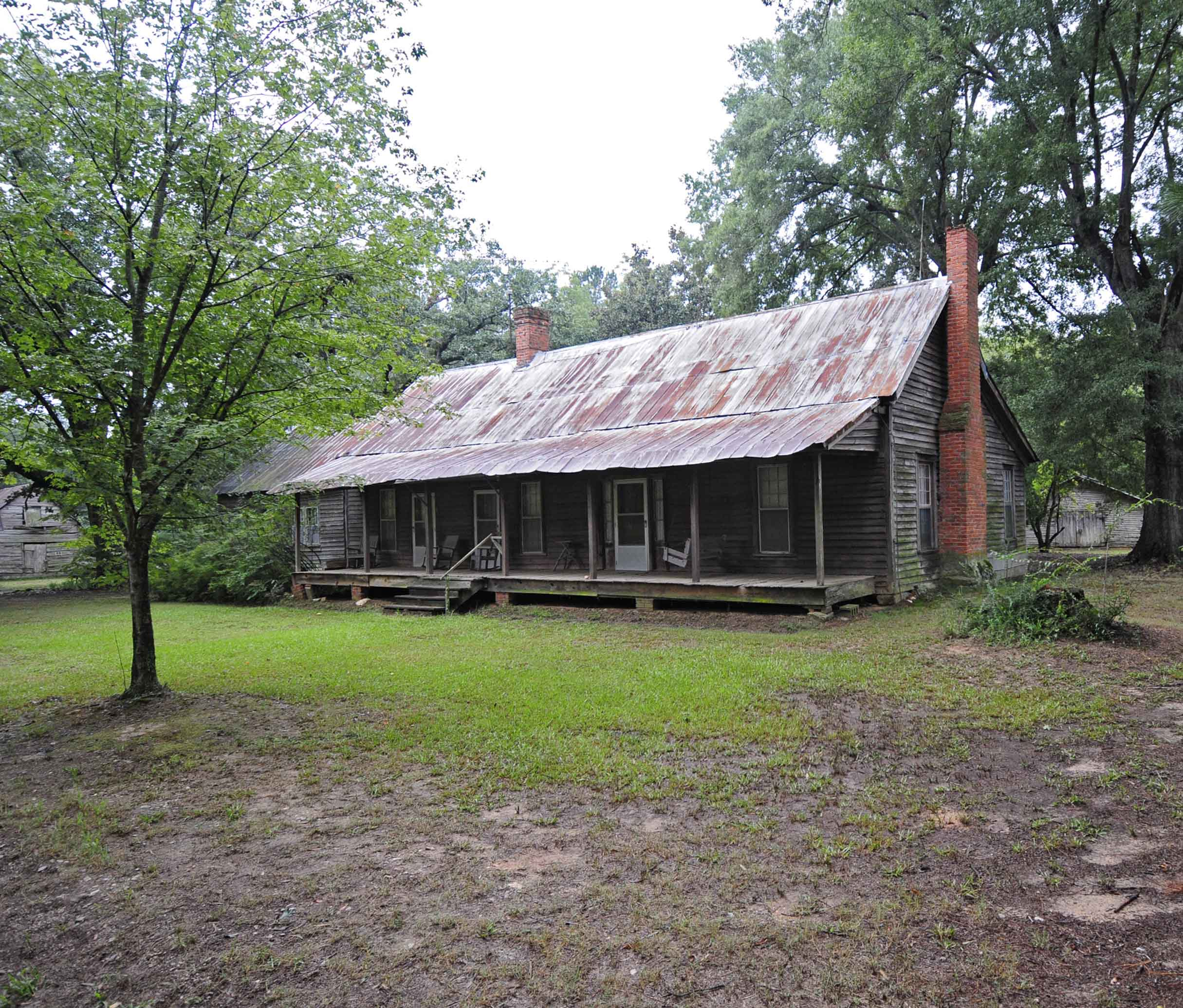
- Stevens–Dorn Farmstead, August 2012

- Location within South Carolina Location within the United States
- Location: Co. Rd. 156. 0.5 mi. S of jct. of Co. Rd. 156 and US 178, Saluda, South Carolina
- Coordinates: 34°01′11″N 81°53′39″W
- Area: 71.5 acres (28.9 ha)
- Built: c. 1880-1900
- Built by: Dorn, Peter B.
- NRHP reference No.: 97000778
- Added to NRHP: July 25, 1997

Stevens–Dorn Farmstead, also known as the Peter M. Dorn Homeplace, is a historic home and farmstead located near Saluda, Saluda County, South Carolina. The house was built in three phases between 1880 and 1900, and is a one-story, rectangular, frame dwelling. The house consists of 1 1/2 rooms, with three major front doors and one minor front door. Also on the property are a contributing woodshed/buggy house, smokehouse, corn crib, and barn, all built about 1880; and three brooder houses dated to about 1945.

It was added to the National Register of Historic Places in 1997.
