= Webb-Coleman House =

Historic house in South Carolina, United States

- U.S. National Register of Historic Places
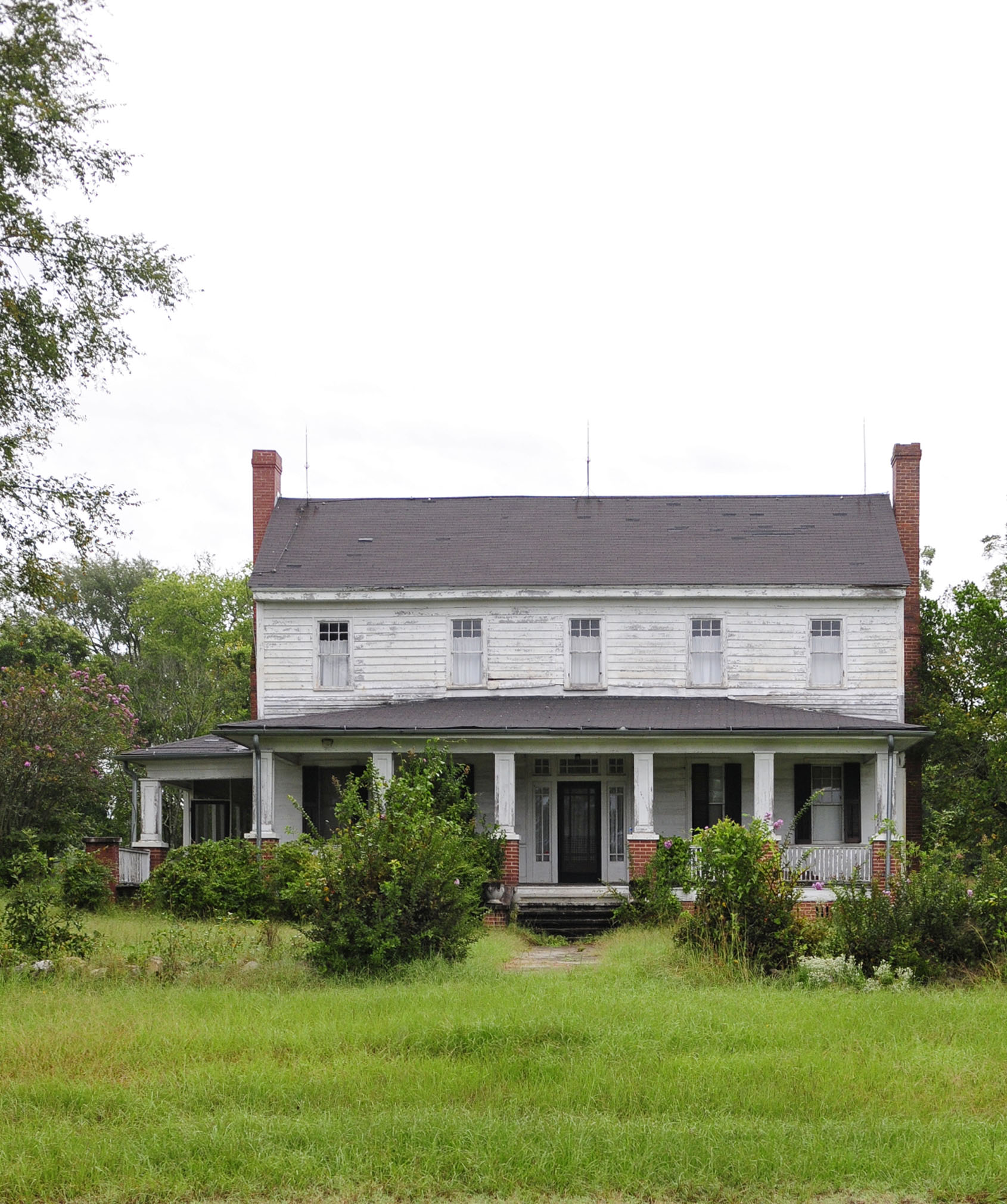
- Webb-Coleman House, August 2012

- Location within South Carolina Location within the United States
- Location: 2 miles south of Chappells, 0.3 miles east of South Carolina Highway 39, at the junction of three dirt roads, near Chappells, South Carolina
- Coordinates: 34°08′54″N 81°50′37″W
- Area: 13.3 acres (5.4 ha)
- Built: c. 1800-1825, 1915
- Architectural style: Federal
- NRHP reference No.: 92000365
- Added to NRHP: April 24, 1992

Webb-Coleman House, also known as Christian's Post Office, is a historic home located near Chappells, Saluda County, South Carolina. It was built between 1800 and 1825, and is a 2 1/2-story, five-bay, Federal style farmhouse. It has a gable roof and is sheathed in weatherboard. A one-story, frame wing was added in the mid-19th century and in 1915, a one-story, gable-roofed, frame ell and shed-roofed porch. Also on the property are the contributing mid-to late-19th century cotton house, an early-20th century garage, an early 1930s dollhouse, and an early-20th century tenant house. The house operated as a post office from 1833 to 1844.

It was added to the National Register of Historic Places in 1992.
