= South Carolina Highway 194 =

State highway in Saluda County, South Carolina

South Carolina Highway 194

Route information
- Maintained by SCDOT
- Length: 14.690 mi (23.641 km)

Major junctions
- South end: US 378 in Saluda
- SC 395 near Saluda
- North end: SC 391 near Stoney Hill

Location
- Country: United States
- State: South Carolina
- Counties: Saluda

Highway system
- South Carolina State Highway System; Interstate; US; State; Scenic
← SC 193	→ SC 198

South Carolina Highway 194 (SC 194) is a 14.690-mile-long (23.641 km) state highway in the U.S. state of South Carolina. The highway connects Saluda and rural areas of Saluda County.

== Route description ==
SC 194 begins at an intersection with U.S. Route 378 (US 378. North Jennings Street and Travis Avenue) in Saluda, within Saluda County. It travels to the north and almost immediately curves to the northeast before leaving the city limits. The highway crosses over Burnett's Creek and Big Creek. Farther to the northeast is a crossing of Indian Creek, just before an intersection with SC 395 (Kempson Bridge Road). The highway then curves to the southeast and goes in an easterly direction to meet its eastern terminus, an intersection with SC 391 (Prosperity Highway), at a point south of Stoney Hill.

== Major intersections ==
The entire route is in Saluda County.

Location	mi	km	Destinations	Notes
Saluda	0.000	0.000	US 378 east (Travis Avenue east) – Lexington, Columbia US 378 west (North Jennings Street south) – McCormick Travis Avenue west (US 178 Conn. west) to US 178 west – Greenwood	Southern terminus of SC 194; eastern terminus of US 178 Conn.
	10.090	16.238	SC 395 north (Kempson Bridge Road) – Newberry	Southern terminus of SC 395
	14.690	23.641	SC 391 (Prosperity Highway) – Batesburg-Leesville, Prosperity	Northern terminus
1.000 mi = 1.609 km; 1.000 km = 0.621 mi
