= Ridge Hill High School =

- U.S. National Register of Historic Places
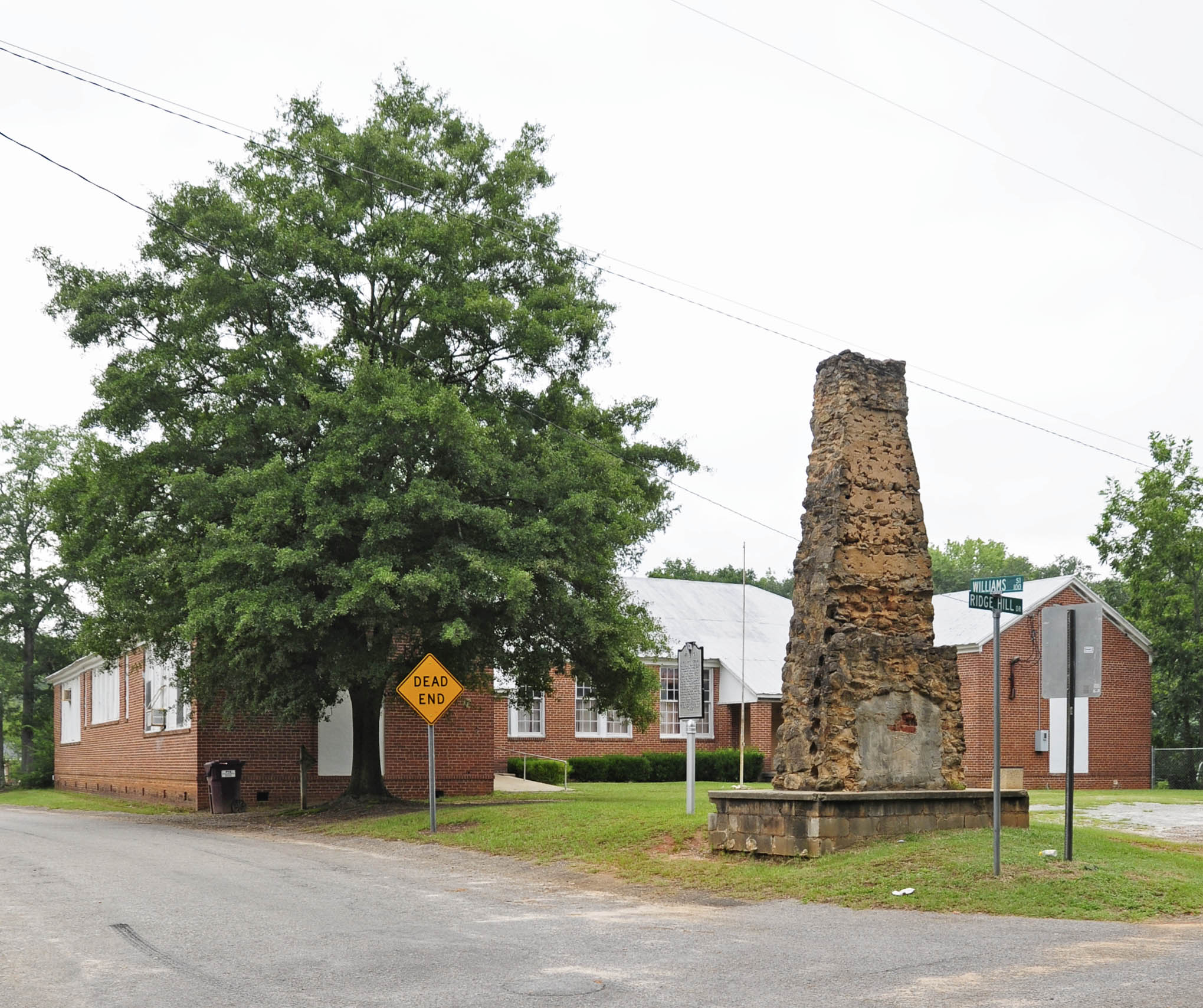
- Ridge Hill High School, August 2012

- Location within South Carolina Location within the United States
- Location: 206 Ridge Hill Dr, Ridge Spring, South Carolina
- Coordinates: 33.8531°N 81.6593°W
- Area: 4.5 acres (1.8 ha)
- Built: 1934
- Architect: Fletcher B. Dressler, Samuel L. Smith
- Architectural style: Bungalow/craftsman
- NRHP reference No.: 10000341
- Added to NRHP: June 9, 2010

Ridge Hill High School, also known as Ridge Spring Star Community Center, is a historic high-school building for African-American students located at Ridge Spring, Saluda County, South Carolina. It was built in 1934, and is a large, one-story, H-shaped building with a central multipurpose room and six classrooms. Ridge Hill was used as a high school until the 1956–1957 school year. It remains in use as a community center.

It was added to the National Register of Historic Places in 2010.
