= Marsh-Johnson House =

Historic house in South Carolina, United States

- U.S. National Register of Historic Places
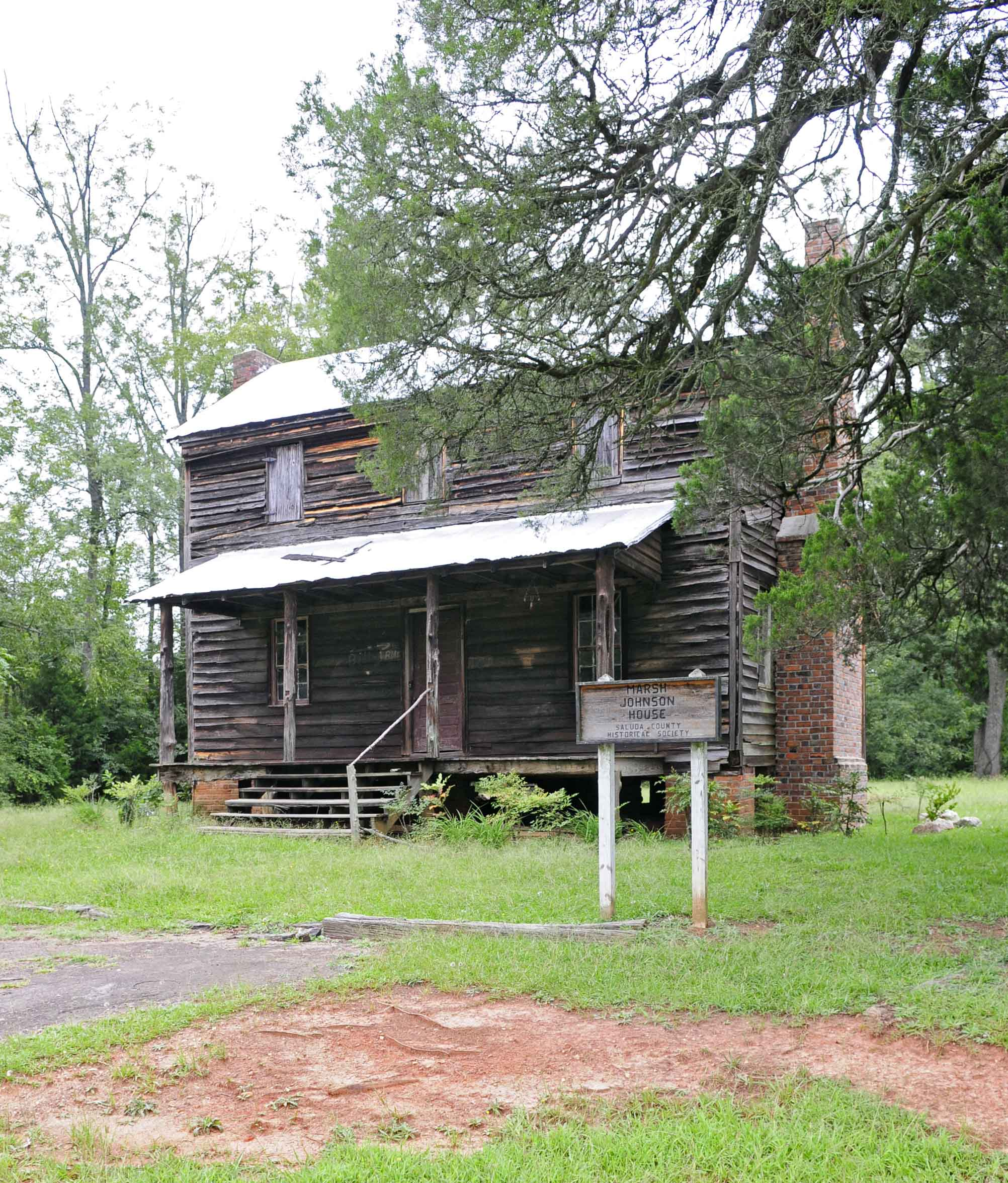
- Marsh-Johnson House, August 2012

- Location within South Carolina Location within the United States
- Location: Intersection of S-41-21 and S-41-37, near Saluda, South Carolina
- Coordinates: 33°54′25″N 81°49′48″W
- Area: 1 acre (0.40 ha)
- Built: c. 1817
- NRHP reference No.: 82003904
- Added to NRHP: June 17, 1982

Marsh-Johnson House, also known as Robert Johnson House, is a historic home located near Saluda, Saluda County, South Carolina. It was built about 1817, and is a two-story, log farmhouse sheathed in weatherboard. The house sits on a brick foundation and has a one-story, shed-roofed porch. It is considered one of the earliest and intact log residences in South Carolina. The house rests on massive brick piers, which are laid in Flemish bond. A one-story, shed-roofed porch with wooden foundation piers and four rough hewn tree trunks supporting the roof spans the façade. Many of the windows retain their batten shutters.

It was added to the National Register of Historic Places in 1982.

The Saluda County Historical Society owns the house and is working to restore it for future use as a historic house museum.
