= Moon-Dominick House =

Historic house in South Carolina, United States

- U.S. National Register of Historic Places
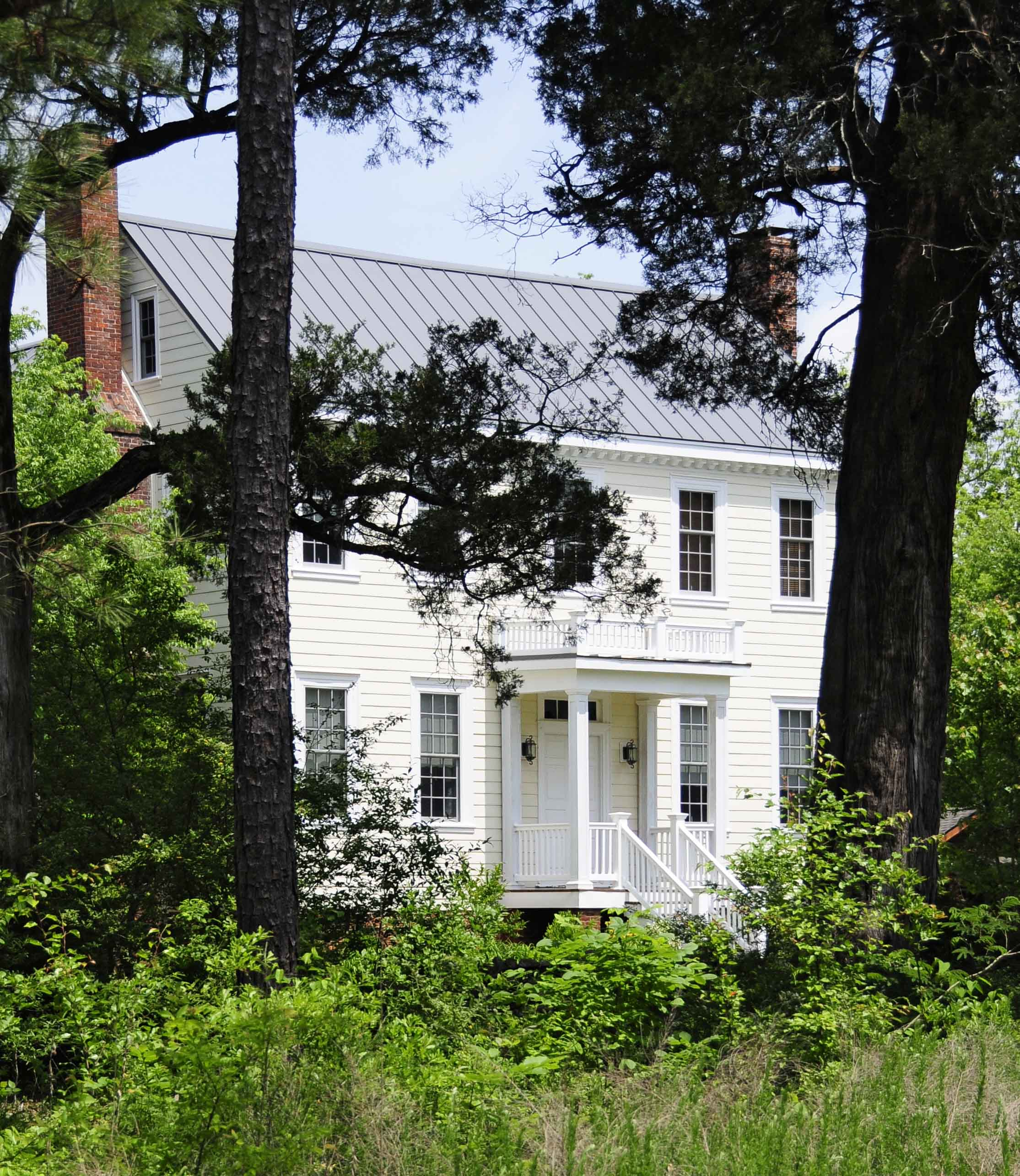
- Moon-Dominick House, April 2012

- Location within South Carolina Location within the United States
- Location: Northeast of Chappells, near Chappells, South Carolina
- Coordinates: 34°13′20″N 81°50′42″W
- Area: 1.8 acres (0.73 ha)
- Built: 1820
- Architectural style: Federal
- NRHP reference No.: 82003896
- Added to NRHP: March 22, 1982

Moon-Dominick House, also known as the Old Tin House, is a historic home located near Chappells, Newberry County, South Carolina. It was built about 1820, and is a 2 1/2-story, frame I-house with Federal style details. It has a high brick basement, gable roof, and exterior end chimneys.

It was listed on the National Register of Historic Places in 1982.
