= Whitehall (Saluda, South Carolina) =

Historic house in South Carolina, United States

- U.S. National Register of Historic Places
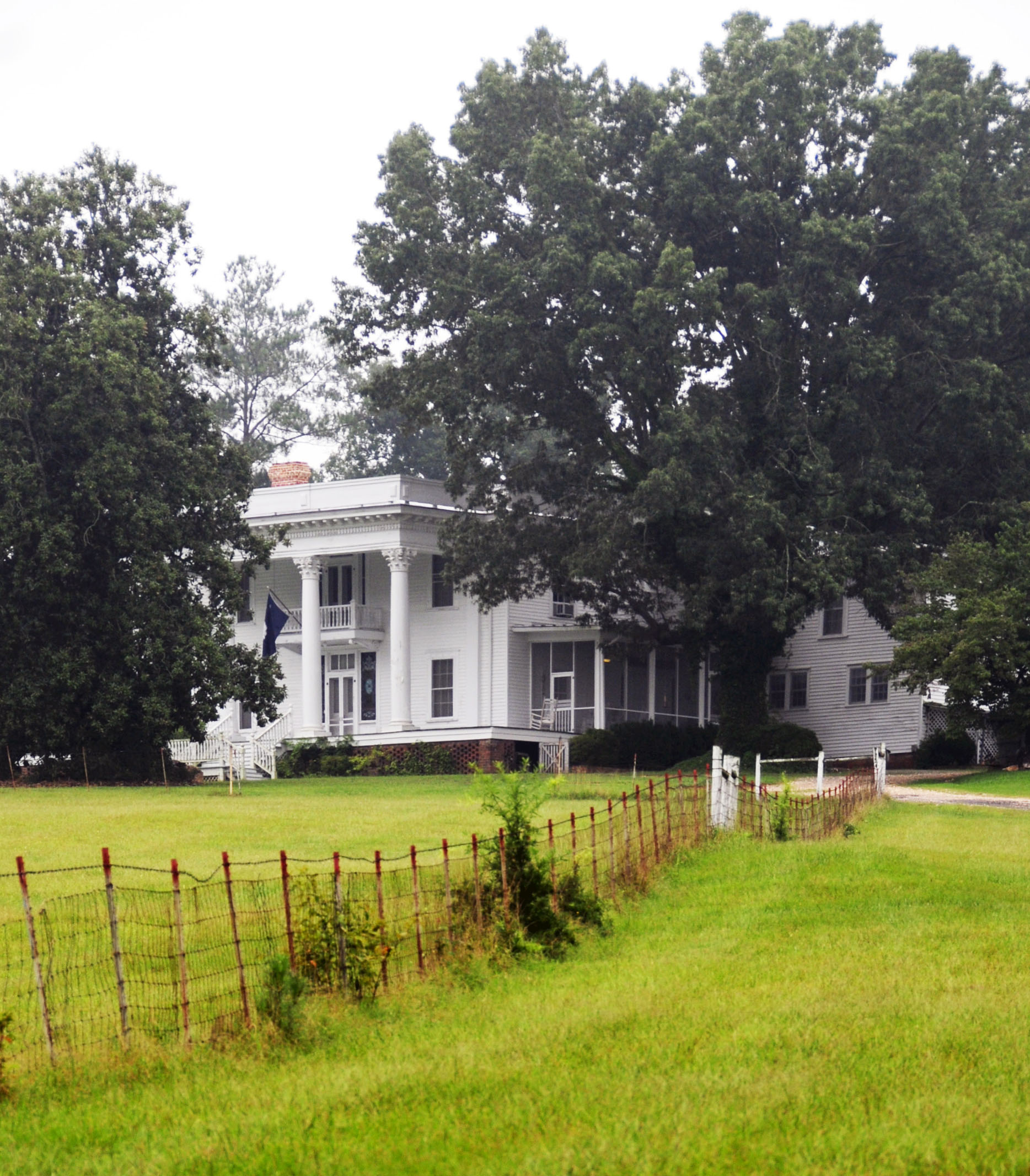
- Whitehall, August 2012

- Location within South Carolina Location within the United States
- Location: Etheredge Rd., Saluda, South Carolina
- Coordinates: 33°59′34″N 81°46′8″W
- Area: 11.9 acres (4.8 ha)
- Built: c. 1893
- Architectural style: Classical Revival
- NRHP reference No.: 80003697
- Added to NRHP: August 21, 1980

Whitehall is a historic home located at Saluda, Saluda County, South Carolina. It was built in about 1893, and is a Classical Revival style frame dwelling with a two-story, rectangular main block with additions. Two façades feature tetrastyle, two-story porticos with Corinthian order columns. Also on the property are 11 outbuildings. It has two sunken rice patties. It was the home of the locally prominent Etheredge family.

It was added to the National Register of Historic Places in 1980.
