= Bonham House =

Historic house in South Carolina, United States

- U.S. National Register of Historic Places
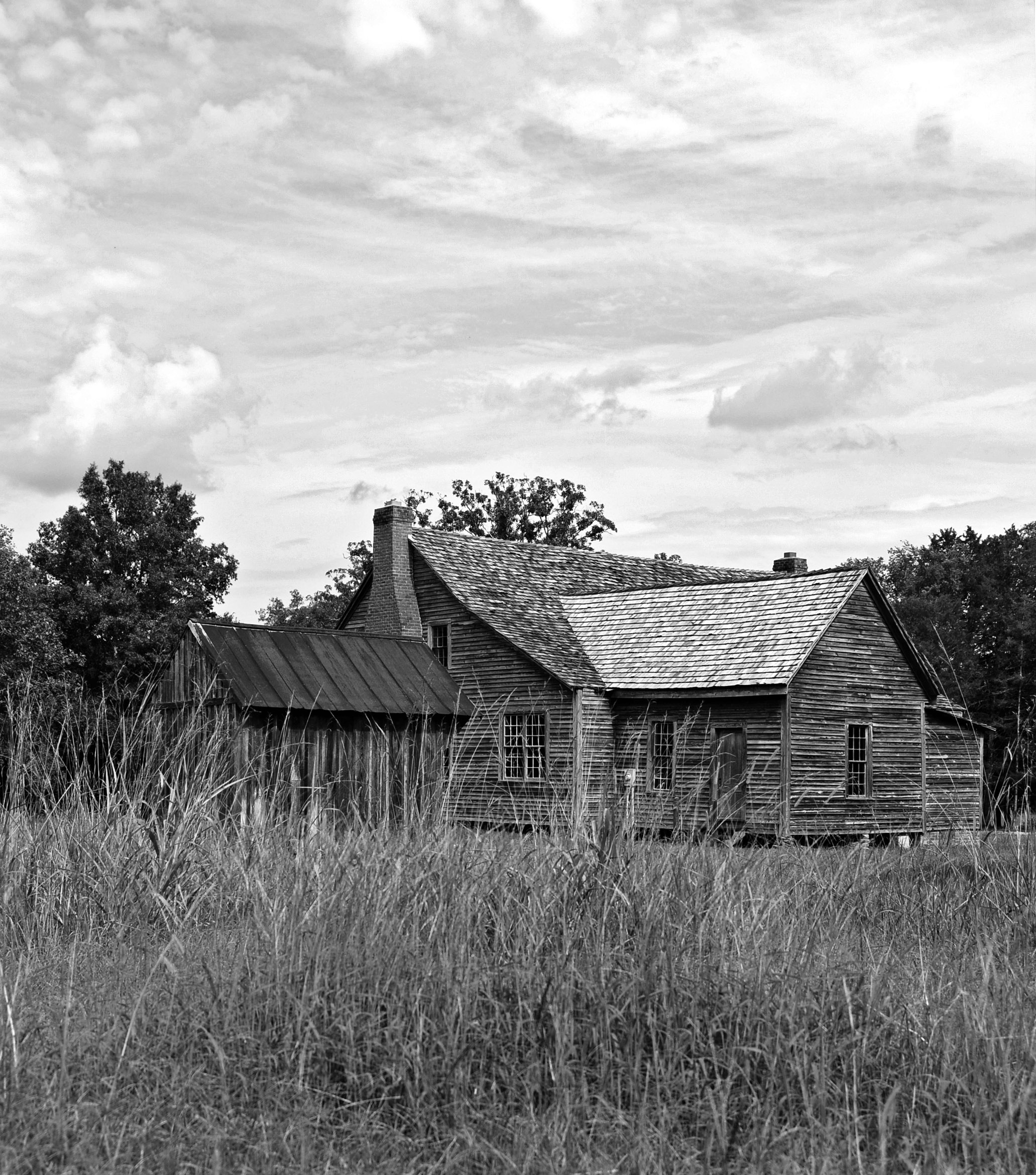
- Bonham House, August 2012

- Location within South Carolina Location within the United States
- Location: Southeast of Saluda off U.S. Route 178, near Saluda, South Carolina
- Coordinates: 34°0′29″N 81°41′53″W
- Area: 2 acres (0.81 ha)
- Built: c. 1780
- Architectural style: Dogtrot
- NRHP reference No.: 74001875
- Added to NRHP: December 30, 1974

Bonham House, also known as Flat Grove, is a historic home located near Saluda, Saluda County, South Carolina. It was built around 1780, and is a two-story, log "dogtrot house." The house sits on fieldstone pillars. It was the boyhood home of Battle of the Alamo soldier James Bonham and his brother politician Milledge Luke Bonham, who served as governor of South Carolina during the American Civil War.

It was added to the National Register of Historic Places in 1974.

The Bonham House is under restoration by the Saluda County Historical Society, which provides tours.
