= Saluda Old Town Site =

Archaeological site in South Carolina, United States

- U.S. National Register of Historic Places
- Nearest city: Saluda, South Carolina
- Area: 20 acres (8.1 ha)
- Built: 1755
- NRHP reference No.: 72001223
- Added to NRHP: June 28, 1972

Saluda Old Town Site is a historic archaeological site located near Saluda, Saluda County, South Carolina. Archaeological remains indicate the site was occupied between 5,000 and 2,000 years ago. It was the site of a town of the Saluda people of the late-17th and early-18th century. On July 2, 1755, it was the site of a treaty signing recognizing the sovereignty of the King of England over all 360,000 square miles of Cherokee lands in South Carolina. In 1769, those lands formed the Ninety-Six District.

It was added to the National Register of Historic Places in 1972.
