= Butler Family Cemetery =

- U.S. National Register of Historic Places
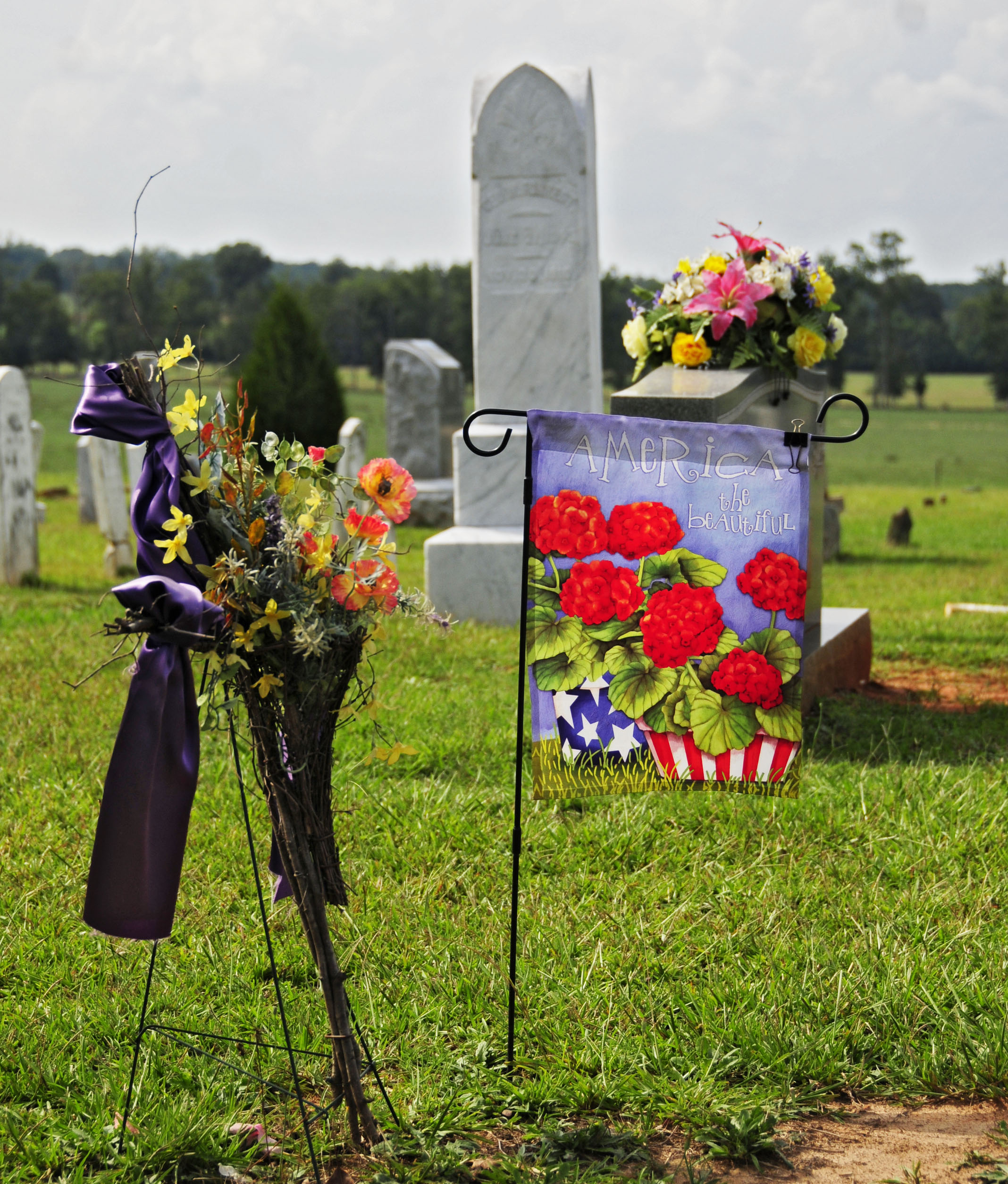
- Butler Family Cemetery, August 2012

- Location within South Carolina Location within the United States
- Location: NE of Saluda off SC 194, near Saluda, South Carolina
- Coordinates: 34°3′56″N 81°43′33″W
- Area: 0.5 acres (0.20 ha)
- Built: c. 1802
- NRHP reference No.: 74001874
- Added to NRHP: December 31, 1974

Butler Family Cemetery is a historic family cemetery located near Saluda, Saluda County, South Carolina. It is located behind the Butler Methodist Church. It was established about 1802, and includes the graves of members of one of South Carolina's leading families. Notable burials include: William Butler (1759–1821), Pierce Mason Butler (1798–1847) and Andrew Pickens Butler (1796–1857).

It was added to the National Register of Historic Places in 1974.
