= George McDuffie =

American politician (1790–1851)

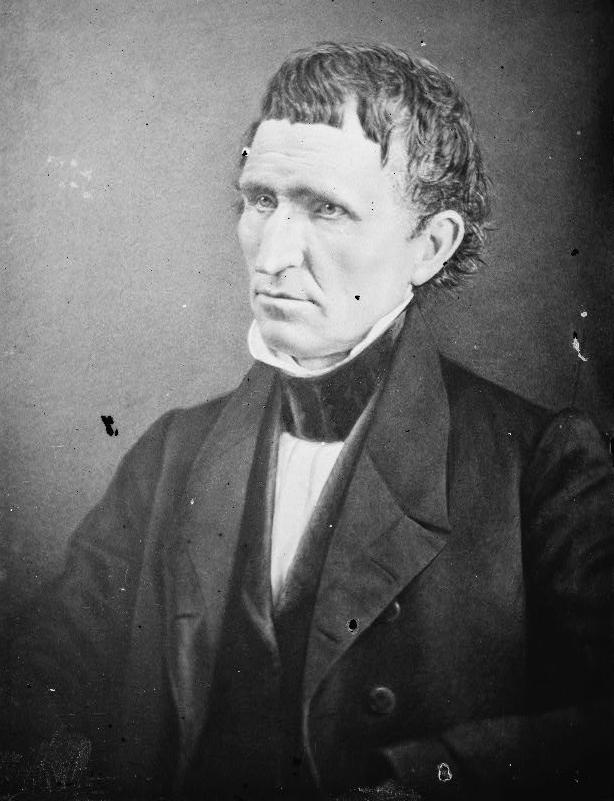

United States Senator from South Carolina
- In office December 23, 1842 – August 17, 1846
- Preceded by: William C. Preston
- Succeeded by: Andrew Butler

55th Governor of South Carolina
- In office December 9, 1834 – December 10, 1836
- Lieutenant: Whitemarsh B. Seabrook
- Preceded by: Robert Y. Hayne
- Succeeded by: Pierce Mason Butler

Member of the U.S. House of Representatives from South Carolina's 5th district
- In office March 4, 1823 – 1834
- Preceded by: Starling Tucker
- Succeeded by: Francis W. Pickens

Member of the U.S. House of Representatives from South Carolina's 6th district
- In office March 4, 1821 – March 3, 1823
- Preceded by: Eldred Simkins
- Succeeded by: John Wilson

Member of the South Carolina House of Representatives from the Edgefield District
- In office November 23, 1818 – November 27, 1820

Personal details
- Born: August 10, 1790 McDuffie County, Georgia, US
- Died: March 11, 1851 (aged 60) Sumter District, South Carolina, US
- Resting place: Singleton's Graveyard
- Party: Democratic
- Other political affiliations: Jacksonian, Nullifier
- Spouse: Mary Rebecca Singleton
- Profession: Politician, lawyer

George McDuffie (August 10, 1790 – March 11, 1851) was the 55th governor of South Carolina and a member of the United States Senate. Though he began his political career as a partisan of Andrew Jackson, he became one of South Carolina's most outspoken advocates of nullification.

== Biography ==
Born of modest means in the area that would become McDuffie County, Georgia, McDuffie's extraordinary intellect was noticed while clerking at a store in Augusta, Georgia. The Calhoun family sponsored his education at Moses Waddel's famous Willington Academy, where he established an outstanding reputation. Graduating from South Carolina College in 1813, he was admitted to the bar in 1814, and went into partnership with Eldred Simkins at Edgefield. Rising rapidly, he served in the South Carolina General Assembly in 1818–1821, and in the United States House of Representatives in 1821–1834. In 1834 he became a major general of the South Carolina Militia.

In 1821 he published a pamphlet in which strict states' rights were strongly denounced; yet in 1832 he became one of the greater nullifiers. The change seems to have been gradual, and to have been determined in part by the influence of John C. Calhoun. When, after 1824, the old Democratic-Republican party split into factions, he followed Andrew Jackson and Martin Van Buren in opposing the Panama Congress and the policy of making Federal appropriations for internal improvements. He did not hesitate, however, to differ from Jackson on the two chief issues of his administration: the Bank and nullification.

In 1832 he was a prominent member of the South Carolina Nullification Convention, and drafted its address to the people of the United States. He served as governor in 1834–1836, during which time he helped to reorganize South Carolina College. From December 23, 1842, until August 17, 1846, he was a member of the United States Senate. The leading Democratic measures of those years all received his hearty support. McDuffie, like Calhoun, became an eloquent champion of state sovereignty; but while Calhoun emphasized state action as the only means of redressing a grievance, McDuffie paid more attention to the grievance itself. Influenced in large measure by Thomas Cooper, he made it his special work to convince the people of the South that the downfall of protection was essential to their material progress. In opposing the 1828 Tariff of Abominations he used the illustration that forty bales of every one hundred went to pay tariffs and therefore Northern interests. His argument that it is the producer who really pays the duty of imports has been called the economic basis of nullification.

In 1822, McDuffie fought a series of duels with Colonel William Cumming, suffering wounds that afflicted him for the rest of his life and darkened his already asocial personality:

McDuffie was in youth, manhood and old age, a remarkable man for his taciturnity and reserve. He literally seemed to commune with himself; yet there were occasions, when he met with old friends and companions, in which he seemed to enjoy life with as much zest as any man.

Benjamin Perley Poore wrote that McDuffie was a "spare, grim-looking man, who was an admirer of Milton, and who was never known to jest or smile." His oratorical style, too, was "nervous and impassioned, and at times fiercely vehement," on one occasion even driving the famously combative John Randolph from the floor with "vituperation witheringly pungent".

While serving in the United States House of Representatives, McDuffie was appointed an impeachment manager to prosecute the articles of impeachment in the impeachment trial of Judge James H. Peck.

George McDuffie died at his estate "Cherry Hill" in Sumter County, South Carolina, on March 11, 1851. McDuffie County, Georgia, is named after him.

U.S. House of Representatives
Preceded by Eldred Simkins	Member of the U.S. House of Representatives from South Carolina's 6th congressional district 1821–1823	Succeeded by John Wilson
Preceded by Starling Tucker	Member of the U.S. House of Representatives from South Carolina's 5th congressional district 1823–1834	Succeeded by Francis Wilkinson Pickens
Political offices
Preceded by Robert Y. Hayne	Governor of South Carolina; 1834–1836	Succeeded by Pierce Mason Butler
U.S. Senate
Preceded by William C. Preston	U.S. senator (Class 3) from South Carolina; December 23, 1842 – August 17, 1846; Served alongside: John C. Calhoun, Daniel Elliott Huger and John C. Calhoun	Succeeded by Andrew Butler
