= Spann Methodist Church and Cemetery =

Historic church in South Carolina, United States

- U.S. National Register of Historic Places
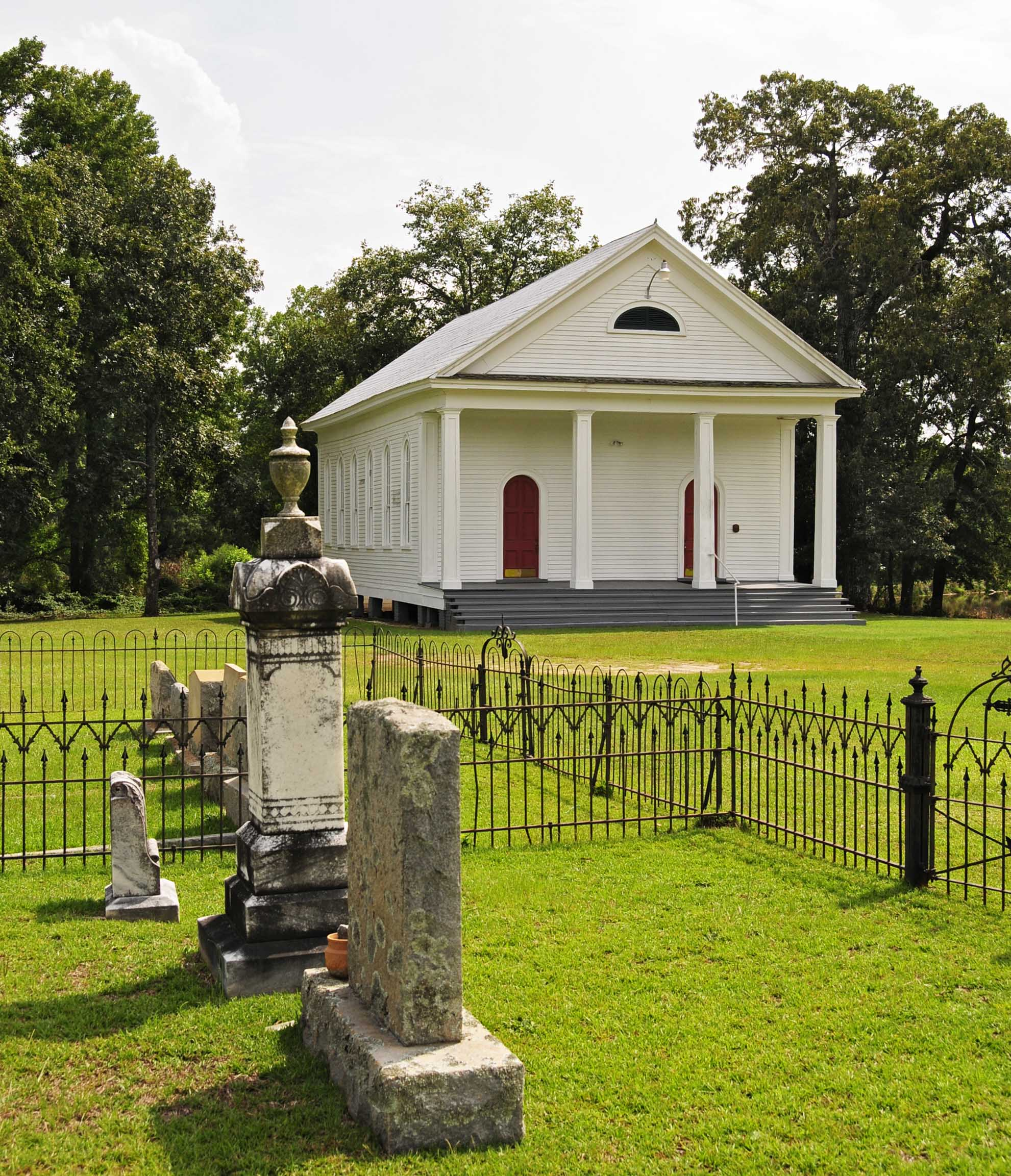

- Location within South Carolina Location within the United States
- Location: 150 Church St., Ward, South Carolina
- Coordinates: 33°51′24″N 81°43′40″W
- Area: 3 acres (1.2 ha)
- Built: 1873
- Architectural style: Greek Revival
- NRHP reference No.: 03001059
- Added to NRHP: October 18, 2003

Spann Methodist Church and Cemetery is a historic Methodist church and cemetery located at 150 Church Street in Ward, Saluda County, South Carolina. The church was established c. 1840 and built in 1873. Unchanged since building, it is a one-story, frame meeting house form church with Greek Revival style elements. The front facade features an engaged tetrastyle portico with a pedimented gable roof. The cemetery was established about 1842, and includes a significant collection of funerary art dating to the late-19th and early-20th centuries.

It was added to the National Register of Historic Places in 2003.
