= James C. Gardner =

American politician

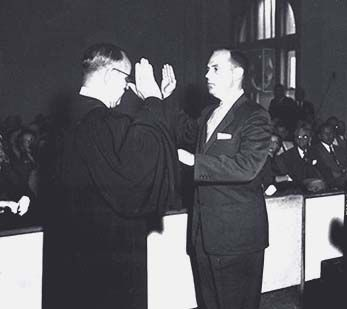
- Gardner (right) sworing in as mayor of Shreveport, Louisiana in 1954

Member of the Louisiana House of Representatives
- In office 1952–1954

Mayor of Shreveport, Louisiana
- In office 1954–1958
- Preceded by: Clyde Fant
- Succeeded by: Clyde Fant

Personal details
- Born: James Creswell Gardner; July 17, 1924 Shreveport, Louisiana, U.S.
- Died: August 27, 2010 (aged 86) Shreveport, Louisiana, U.S.
- Party: Democratic
- Relatives: Pierce Mason Butler (ancestor)
- Education: Louisiana State University

James Creswell Gardner (July 17, 1924 – August 27, 2010), nicknamed "Mr. Shreveport", was an American politician. A member of the Democratic Party, he served in the Louisiana House of Representatives from 1952 to 1954 and as mayor of Shreveport, Louisiana from 1954 to 1958.

== Life and career ==
Gardner was born in Shreveport, Louisiana, the son of Arville Gardner and Marie Creswell. He was a descendant of Pierce Mason Butler, a South Carolina governor. He attended C. E. Byrd High School, graduating in 1940. After graduating, he attended Louisiana State University, earning his AB degree in history and government. He also attended Centenary College of Louisiana.

Gardner served in the Louisiana House of Representatives from 1952 to 1954. After his service in the House, he served as mayor of Shreveport, Louisiana from 1954 to 1958.

== Death ==
Gardner died of cancer on August 27, 2010, at the Willis-Knighton Pierremont in Shreveport, Louisiana, at the age of 86.
