= Chappells, South Carolina =

- Unincorporated community
- Location within South Carolina Location within the United States
- Coordinates: 34°10′47″N 81°52′00″W
- Country: United States
- State: South Carolina
- Counties: Newberry, Saluda
- Elevation: 436 ft (133 m)
- Time zone: UTC-5 (Eastern (EST))
  - Summer (DST): UTC-4 (EDT)
- ZIP code: 29037
- Area codes: 803, 839
- GNIS feature ID: 1247255

Chappells (also Chappell, Chappells Bridge) is an unincorporated community, in Newberry and Saluda Counties, South Carolina, United States.

The community was named after the local Chappell family of pioneer citizens. The Moon-Dominick House and Webb-Coleman House are listed on the National Register of Historic Places.

After the 1755 Treaty of Saluda Old Town ceded former Cherokee land to the Saluda area, Thomas Chappell settled on the north side of the Saluda River and was given permission to operate a ferry. In 1792 Thomas built a bridge across the Saluda, but it was destroyed in 1800 and he once again operated a ferry service. The area became known as Chappell's Ferry. A post office was established in 1820, closed after a year, then reopened again in 1830.

Thomas' son John built another bridge over the river in 1838. 1852 saw the arrival of the Greenville and Columbia Railroad, and the area, now known as Chappell's Depot, was a thriving community. Unfortunately, a tornado on 19 February, 1884 wiped out nearly the entire town. It was rebuilt, but the town suffered several fires in the 1920s and started to decline, with several businesses vacant by 1926. A flood in 1928 destroyed the bridge and most of the remaining businesses, and the bank shut down in 1929. A new, modern bridge was built for Highway 39 to span the river west of the town in 1931. This bypassed Main Street and sealed the town's fate. Chappells became a ghost town except for the still-functioning post office.
