= Waddy Thompson Jr. =

American politician

United States Minister to Mexico
- In office February 10, 1842 – March 9, 1844
- Appointed by: John Tyler
- Preceded by: Henry E. Lawrence (as Special Diplomatic Agent)
- Succeeded by: Moses Yale Beach (as Special Diplomatic Agent)

Member of the U.S. House of Representatives from South Carolina's 6th district
- In office September 10, 1835 – March 3, 1841
- Preceded by: Warren R. Davis
- Succeeded by: William Butler

Member of the South Carolina House of Representatives
- In office 1826–1829

Personal details
- Born: January 8, 1798 Pickensville, Ninety-Six District, South Carolina, U.S.
- Died: November 23, 1868 (aged 70) Tallahassee, Florida, U.S.
- Resting place: Tallahassee, Florida
- Party: Anti-Jacksonian (1835–1837); Whig (1837–onward)
- Profession: attorney, judge, diplomat

Military service
- Branch/service: South Carolina State Militia
- Years of service: 1832
- Rank: Brigadier General

Waddy Thompson Jr. (January 8, 1798 – November 23, 1868) was a U.S. representative from South Carolina and U.S. Minister to Mexico, 1842–44.

Born in Pickensville, Ninety-Six District, South Carolina—near Easley in present Pickens County—Thompson was reared in Greenville. He graduated from South Carolina College in 1814 when he was 16; and he was admitted to the bar in 1819, beginning practice in Edgefield, South Carolina, and marrying Emmala Butler, the daughter one of the state's richest plantation owners. The couple moved to Greenville circa 1824, where Thompson became politically active. He served as member of the South Carolina House of Representatives from 1826 to 1829. Thompson was elected solicitor of the western circuit in 1830.

Fervently supporting the theory of Vice President John C. Calhoun that a state could nullify an act of the U.S. Congress, Thompson introduced a resolution in the South Carolina General Assembly in 1832 calling for a convention to nullify the "Tariff of Abominations." The Nullification Crisis dissipated the following year; but in the meantime Thompson was appointed brigadier general of South Carolina militia, and he was thereafter referred to as "General Thompson."

In 1835, Thompson was elected as an Anti-Jacksonian to the 24th United States Congress to fill the vacancy caused by the death of Warren R. Davis. He was reelected as a Whig to the 25th and 26th Congresses serving from September 10, 1835, to March 3, 1841. Thompson served as chairman of the Committee on Military Affairs in the 26th Congress.

In 1842 President John Tyler appointed Thompson Envoy Extraordinary and Minister Plenipotentiary to Mexico, where he served from February 10, 1842, to March 9, 1844. Thompson quickly learned enough Spanish to make his first speech to Mexican cabinet members in that language. He became friendly with Mexican president Antonio López de Santa Anna and succeeded in having 300 Texan prisoners freed. Two years after his return to the United States, Thompson published Recollections of Mexico, and he opposed the Mexican War.

Thompson returned to Greenville and managed plantations in Edgefield and Madison, Florida—the latter of which was 1,300 acres and employed 80 slaves. After his wife died in 1848, he married Cornelia Jones of Wilmington, North Carolina, and eventually moved to Paris Mountain, near Greenville, where he owned a 1,000 acres and built two large identical houses, one for himself and the other for his wife—though the couple seemed to be on good terms. Thompson filled his house with Mexican memorabilia and employed a full-time gardener to care for exotic plants and shrubs he had collected.

By the time of the Civil War, Thompson had become a Unionist, but the conclusion of the war nevertheless ruined him. In 1866, he sold his Paris Mountain property and moved to his Florida plantation. The Florida legislature appointed him solicitor general of a circuit in 1868, but in 1868 he died while in Tallahassee, and he was buried in the churchyard of St. John's Episcopal Church there.

== Sources ==
- United States Congress. "Waddy Thompson Jr. (id: T000221)". Biographical Directory of the United States Congress.

Diplomatic posts
Preceded by Henry E. Lawrence (as Special Diplomatic Agent)	United States Minister to Mexico; 1842–1844	Succeeded by Moses Yale Beach (as Special Diplomatic Agent)
U.S. House of Representatives
Preceded by Warren R. Davis	Member of the U.S. House of Representatives from South Carolina's 6th congressional district 1835–1841	Succeeded by William Butler
