= Ridge Spring, South Carolina =

- Town
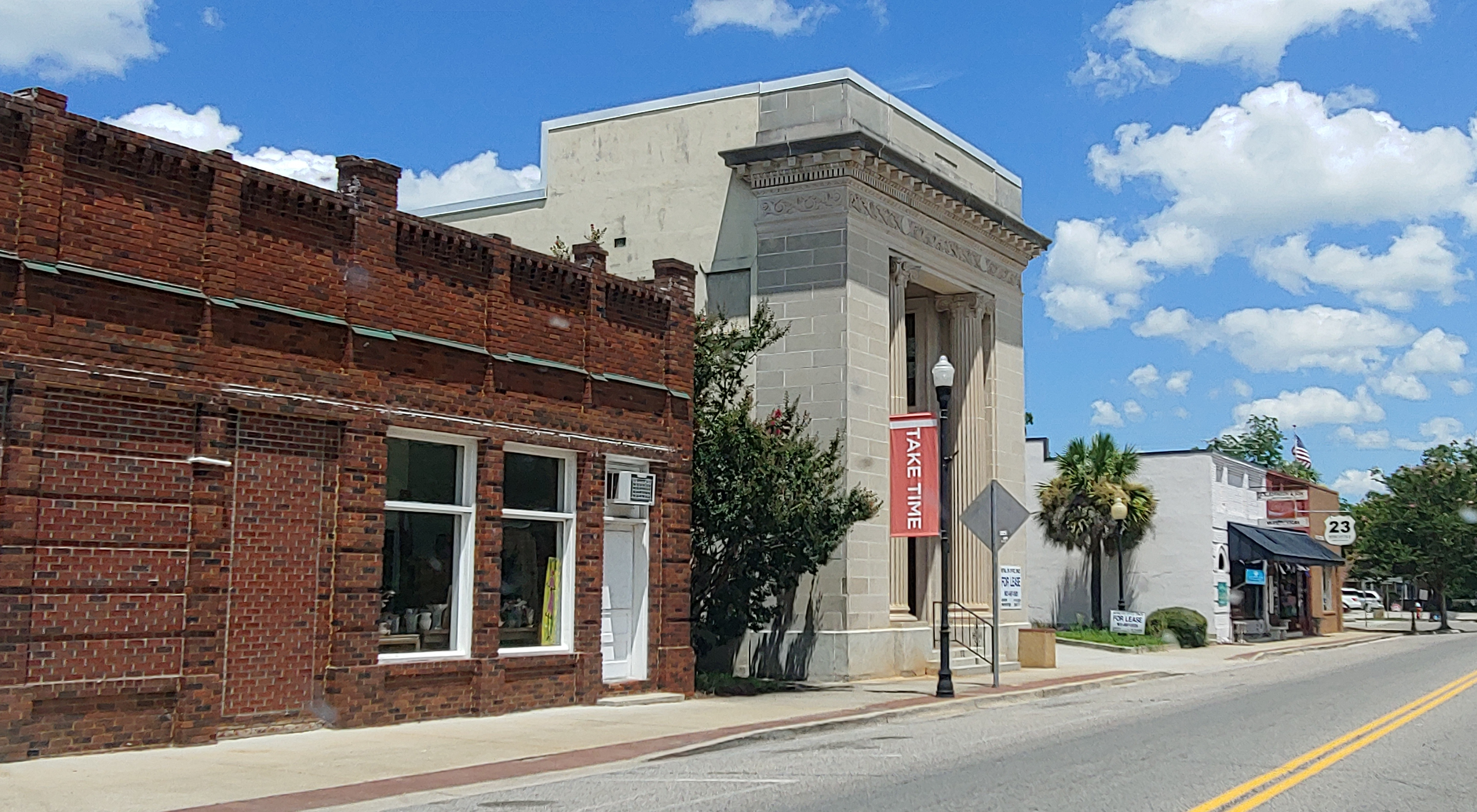
- Downtown Ridge Spring

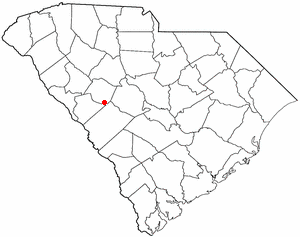
- Location of Ridge Spring, South Carolina
- Coordinates: 33°50′43″N 81°39′42″W
- Country: United States
- State: South Carolina
- County: Saluda

Area
  - Total: 1.85 sq mi (4.79 km^{2})
  - Land: 1.82 sq mi (4.72 km^{2})
  - Water: 0.027 sq mi (0.07 km^{2})
- Elevation: 637 ft (194 m)

Population (2020)
  - Total: 579
  - Density: 317.8/sq mi (122.72/km^{2})
- Time zone: UTC-5 (Eastern (EST))
  - Summer (DST): UTC-4 (EDT)
- ZIP code: 29129
- Area codes: 803, 839
- FIPS code: 45-60325
- GNIS feature ID: 2407212
- Website: www.ridgespringsc.com

Ridge Spring is a town in Saluda County, South Carolina, United States. As of the 2020 census, Ridge Spring had a population of 579. It is part of the Columbia, SC Metropolitan Statistical Area.

== History ==
Ridge Hill High School was added to the National Register of Historic Places in 2010.

After a mayoral election in 2025, seven town employees resigned, including the public works director and police chief. The police chief's successor faced disputes in 2026 over the damaging of 14 Flock cameras. An attempt to seek a warrant over an online expletive surrounding Flock cameras in September 2026 resulted in the criticism of the town's local police department.

== Geography ==
According to the United States Census Bureau, the town has a total area of 1.9 square miles (4.9 km^{2}), of which 1.8 square miles (4.7 km^{2}) are land and 0.04 square miles (0.10 km^{2}) (1.08%) is covered by water.

== Demographics ==
Historical population
Census	Pop.	Note	%±
1880	328		—
1890	390		18.9%
1900	411		5.4%
1910	505		22.9%
1920	597		18.2%
1930	628		5.2%
1940	661		5.3%
1950	598		−9.5%
1960	649		8.5%
1970	644		−0.8%
1980	969		50.5%
1990	861		−11.1%
2000	823		−4.4%
2010	737		−10.4%
2020	579		−21.4%
U.S. Decennial Census

=== 2020 census ===
Ridge Spring town, South Carolina – Racial and ethnic composition Note: the US Census treats Hispanic/Latino as an ethnic category. This table excludes Latinos from the racial categories and assigns them to a separate category. Hispanics/Latinos may be of any race.
Race / Ethnicity (NH = Non-Hispanic)	Pop 2000	Pop 2010	Pop 2020	% 2000	% 2010	% 2020
White alone (NH)	279	260	224	33.90%	35.28%	38.69%
Black or African American alone (NH)	511	435	317	62.09%	59.02%	54.75%
Native American or Alaska Native alone (NH)	1	2	0	0.12%	0.27%	0.00%
Asian alone (NH)	0	1	0	0.00%	0.14%	0.00%
Native Hawaiian or Pacific Islander alone (NH)	0	1	0	0.00%	0.14%	0.00%
Other race alone (NH)	0	0	0	0.00%	0.00%	0.00%
Mixed race or Multiracial (NH)	11	16	13	1.34%	2.17%	2.25%
Hispanic or Latino (any race)	21	22	25	2.55%	2.99%	4.32%
Total	823	737	579	100.00%	100.00%	100.00%

=== 2000 census ===
As of the census of 2000, 823 people, 321 households, and 217 families resided in the town. The population density was 449.3 people per square mile (173.5 people/km^{2}). The 368 housing units averaged 200.9 per square mile (77.6/km^{2}). The racial makeup of the town was 33.90% White, 63.91% Black, 0.12% Native American, 0.61% from other races, and 1.46% from two or more races. Hispanics or Latinos of any race were 2.55% of the population.

Of the 321 households, 26.2% had children under the age of 18 living with them, 40.5% were married couples living together, 22.4% had a female householder with no husband present, and 32.1% were not families. About 28.0% of all households were made up of individuals, and 15.9% had someone living alone who was 65 years of age or older. The average household size was 2.56 and the average family size was 3.18.

In the town, the population was distributed as 24.4% under the age of 18, 9.7% from 18 to 24, 23.5% from 25 to 44, 23.7% from 45 to 64, and 18.7% who were 65 years of age or older. The median age was 40 years. For every 100 females, there were 81.3 males. For every 100 females age 18 and over, there were 80.3 males.

The median income for a household in the town was $25,982, and for a family was $28,984. Males had a median income of $30,476 versus $20,208 for females. The per capita income for the town was $12,083. About 23.4% of families and 26.6% of the population were below the poverty line, including 39.2% of those under age 18 and 16.0% of those age 65 or over.

== Education ==
It is within the Aiken County Public School District.

Ridge Spring-Monetta Middle-High School, which has a Monetta postal address, and is outside of the city limits in unincorporated Aiken County, is the secondary school of the area.

Areas of the district in Saluda County are zoned to Ridge Spring-Monetta Elementary School and Ridge Spring-Monetta Middle-High School.

Ridge Spring has a public library, a branch of the Saluda County Library.
