= Andrew Butler =

American politician (1796–1857)

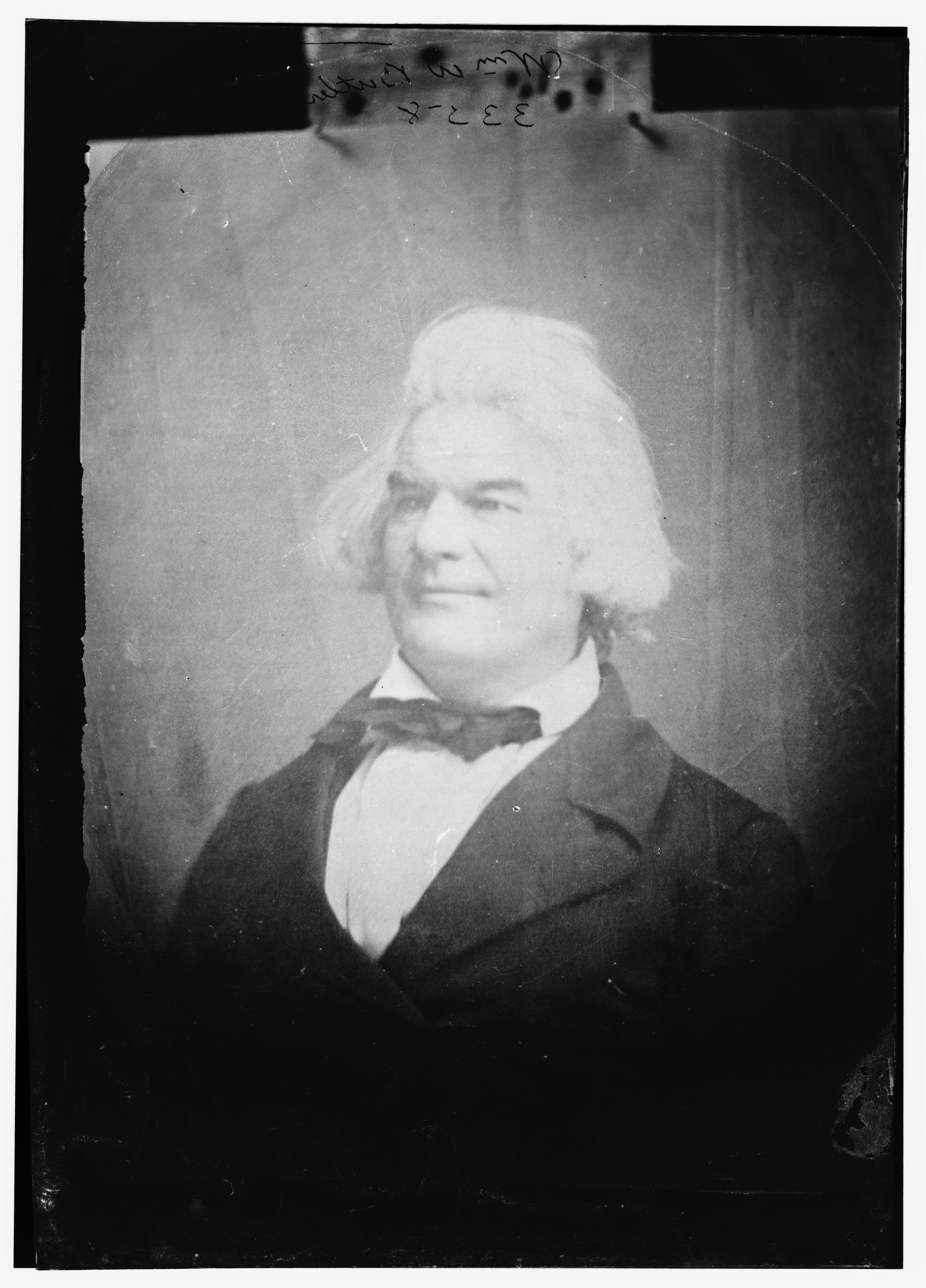

United States Senator from South Carolina
- In office December 4, 1846 – May 25, 1857
- Preceded by: George McDuffie
- Succeeded by: James H. Hammond

Judge of the South Carolina Court of Common Pleas
- In office December 6, 1833 – December 3, 1846

Member of the South Carolina Senate from Edgefield District
- In office November 22, 1824 – December 5, 1833

Personal details
- Born: Andrew Pickens Butler; November 18, 1796 Edgefield, South Carolina, U.S.
- Died: May 25, 1857 (aged 60) Edgefield, South Carolina, U.S.
- Party: Democratic
- Spouse(s): Susan Ann Simkins; Rebecca Harriett Hayne
- Profession: Politician, lawyer, judge

Andrew Pickens Butler (November 18, 1796 – May 25, 1857) was an American lawyer and United States senator from South Carolina who authored the Kansas-Nebraska Act with Senator Stephen Douglas of Illinois.

In 1856, abolitionist senator Charles Sumner gave a speech in which he insulted Butler's character. In response, Preston Brooks, Butler's first cousin once-removed, caned Sumner on the Senate floor, nearly killing him.

== Biography ==
Butler was a son of William Butler and Behethland Butler (1764–1853), and he was born in Edgefield, South Carolina. His early education was at Moses Waddel's Willington Academy. He graduated from South Carolina College, now the University of South Carolina. He was admitted to the South Carolina bar in 1818. Butler had two wives; Susan Anne Sirr 1830 and Harriet Hayne who had his only child, Eloise.

== Political history ==
Butler was elected to the South Carolina House of Representatives as a young man, and in 1824 was elected to the South Carolina Senate. He served two terms and part of a third in the state Senate before being appointed the judge of the session court in 1833. In 1835, Butler was appointed the judge of the South Carolina Court of Common Pleas.

== U.S. Senate ==
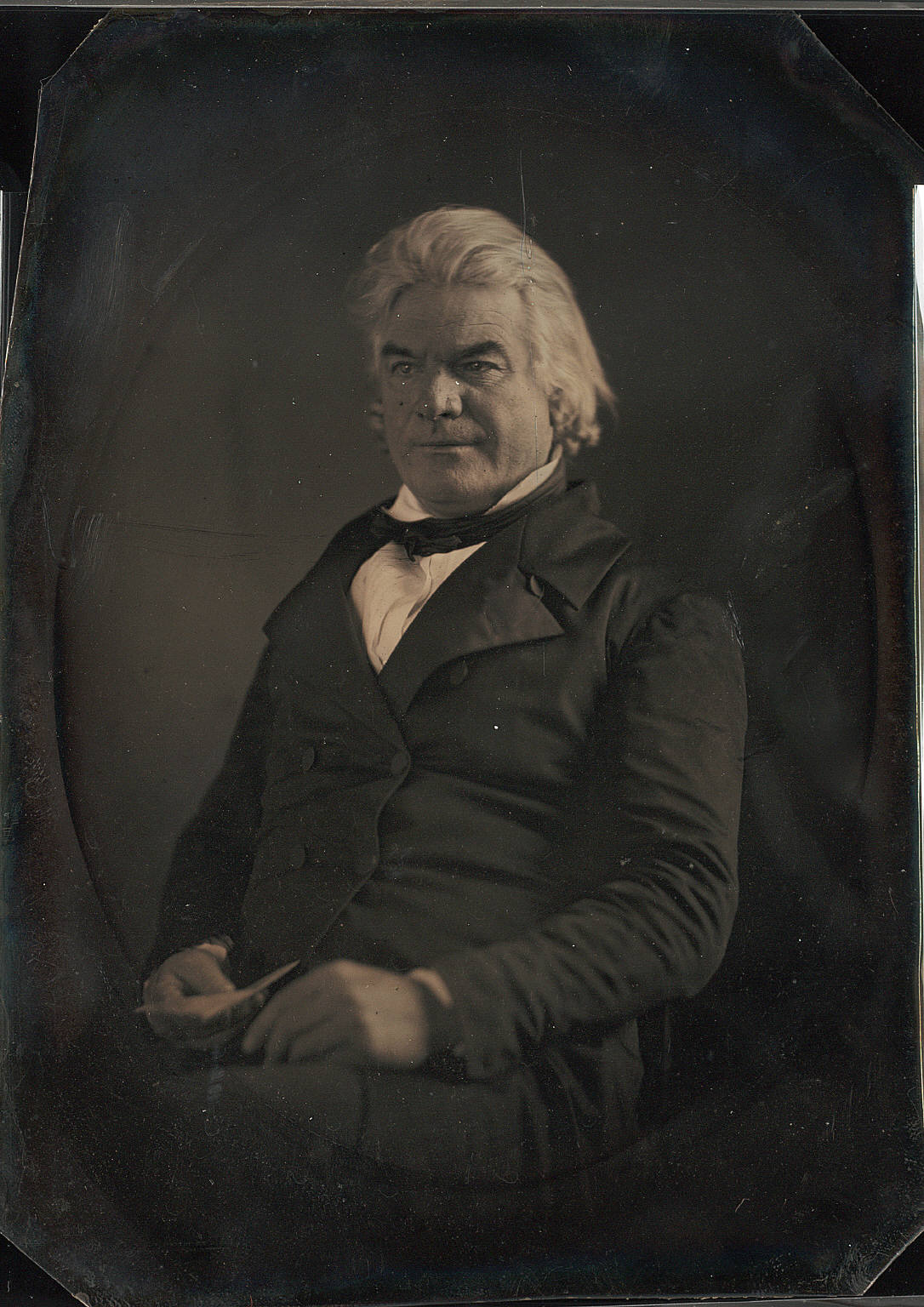
Daguerreotype of Senator Andrew P. Butler, 1849

Butler was appointed to the United States Senate in 1846 as a States' Rights Democrat and elected thereafter to finish the term ending in 1849. He was re-elected by the South Carolina legislature to a full term in 1848 and again re-elected in 1854. He served in the Senate for the remainder of his life and was the chairman of the Senate Judiciary Committee during much of that time.

Butler was an ardent advocate of slavery. He was a co-author with Stephen A. Douglas of the Kansas-Nebraska Act of 1854. This act provided for westward expansion, but in order to gain Southern support, it repealed the Compromise of 1820 by allowing voting residents of new states the right to choose on allowing slavery.

Butler's Senate career is noted for an event at which he was not present. Senator Charles Sumner of Massachusetts, during his "Crime Against Kansas" speech in May 1856, denigrated South Carolina and abused Butler personally in terms considered to exceed parliamentary propriety. Sumner likened Butler to Don Quixote and said Butler: "has chosen a mistress to whom he has made his vows, and who, though ugly to others, is always lovely to him; though polluted in the sight of the world, is chaste in his sight. I mean the harlot, Slavery." Senator Stephen Douglas, who was also a subject of criticism during the speech, suggested to a colleague while Sumner was orating that "this damn fool [Sumner] is going to get himself shot by some other damn fool."

South Carolina Congressman Preston Brooks, the first cousin once removed of Butler, considered Sumner's speech an attack on his family honor. Two days after the speech, Brooks brutally beat Sumner on the Senate floor with a gutta-percha cane, while fellow South Carolina Rep. Laurence Keitt brandished a pistol to prevent other senators from intervening, even as Sumner lay defenseless on the floor and Brooks continued to beat him. Butler later remarked that if present during the speech, he would have called Sumner to order, hoping to prevent further offense.

== Death ==
Butler's death at age 60 was attributed to dropsy, an archaic term for edema. He was buried in the Butler Family Cemetery near Saluda.

== Evaluation ==
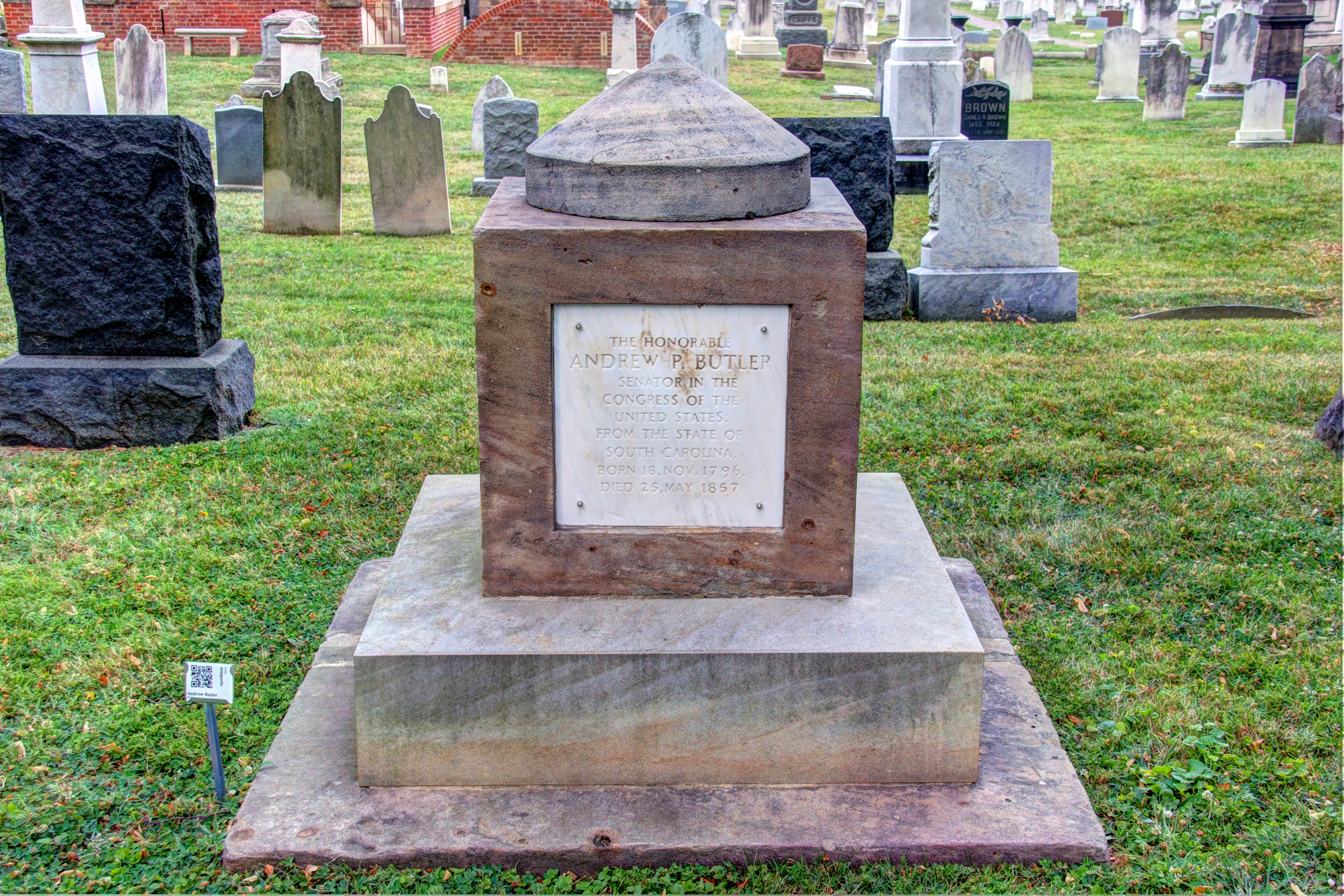
Butler's cenotaph at the Congressional Cemetery

U. R. Brooks noted that biographical material to write from was scanty and that Butler's power lay in his own presence with "grand gifts of eloquence, action, pathos, and convincing argument." Ellet wrote

Senator Andrew Pickens Butler was conceded to be the most unique and original intellect in the Senate. His face, though not handsome, was sturdily expressive, with massive features and "troubled, streaming, silvery hair, that looked as though it had been contending with the blasts of winter".... His power as a speaker stood acknowledged in the admiration of both Houses... Like all men of impetuous impulse, he was very restless; one moment pacing to and fro the space behind the Speaker's desk, another giving the grasp of his hand to some younger Senator, the next taking active part in the debates of the day.... The moment a question was submitted to him, his mind instinctively applied all the great principles.

== Legacy ==
Butler County, Kansas is named for him. His brother William Butler and his nephew Matthew Calbraith Butler also served in the United States Congress.

== See also ==
- List of members of the United States Congress who died in office (1790–1899)

== Notes ==
U.S. Senate
Preceded by George McDuffie	U.S. senator (Class 3) from South Carolina; December 4, 1846 – May 25, 1857; Served alongside: John C. Calhoun, Franklin H. Elmore, Robert W. Barnwell, Robert B. Rhett, William F. De Saussure and Josiah J. Evans	Succeeded by James H. Hammond
Political offices
Preceded by Chester Ashley	Chairman of the Senate Judiciary Committee; 1847–1857	Succeeded by James A. Bayard Jr.
