= James Bonham =

American soldier

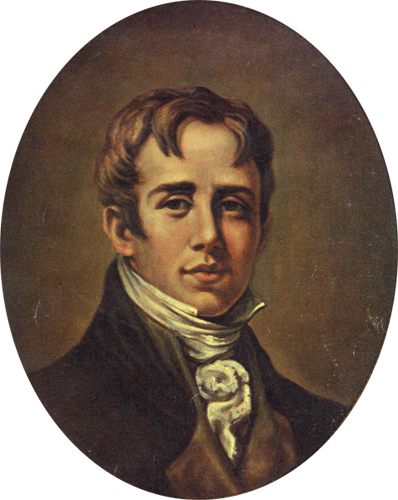
- Bonham, c. 1835
- Born: February 20, 1807; Saluda County, South Carolina
- Died: March 6, 1836 (aged 29); San Antonio, Texas
- Relatives: Milledge Luke Bonham (brother)
- Military career
- Allegiance: Republic of Texas
- Branch: Texian Army
- Service years: 1835-1836
- Rank: Second lieutenant
- Conflicts: Texas Revolution; Battle of the Alamo †

James Butler Bonham (February 20, 1807 – March 6, 1836) was a 19th-century American soldier who died at the Battle of the Alamo during the Texas Revolution. He was a second cousin of William B. Travis and was a messenger of the Battle of the Alamo. His younger brother, Milledge Luke Bonham, was a brigadier general in the Confederate States Army in the American Civil War, and served as Governor of South Carolina from 1862 to 1864.

== Early life ==
Bonham was born, along with his brother Milledge Luke Bonham in what is now Saluda County, South Carolina on February 20, 1807. He was the son of James and Sophia Butler (Smith) Bonham. The family home, called Flat Grove, is still standing and is on the National Register of Historic Places.

Bonham entered South Carolina College in 1824. In 1827, in his senior year, he led a student protest over harsh attendance regulations and the poor food served at the college boardinghouse. He was expelled, along with the entire senior class. In 1830, Bonham practiced law in Pendleton, but was found in contempt of court after caning an attorney who had insulted one of Bonham's clients. When ordered to apologize by the sitting judge, he refused and threatened to tweak the judge's nose. Bonham was sentenced to ninety days for contempt of court.

He served as an aide to Governor James Hamilton Jr. during the Nullification Crisis in 1832. Bonham brandished a sword and pistol, condemning Andrew Jackson and the Washington politicians. His outspoken position brought him the rank of lieutenant colonel. At the same time he served as captain of a Charleston artillery company.

In October 1834, Bonham moved to Montgomery, Alabama, where relatives lived. The following year he went to Mobile, where he helped organize a company of militia cavalry called the Mobile Greys to serve in Texas. The company reached San Felipe, Texas in November 1835, and Bonham was commissioned a lieutenant in the Texian Cavalry on December 3.

== Texas and the Alamo ==
On December 1, 1835, he wrote to Sam Houston from San Felipe volunteering his services for Texas and declining all pay, lands, or rations in return. In December 1835, he was commissioned a second lieutenant in the Texas cavalry, but apparently was not assigned to any specific unit. He had time to set up a law practice in Brazoria and was advertising the fact in the Telegraph and Texas Register by January 2, 1836.

Bonham and Houston quickly developed a mutual admiration. After being in Texas for only one month Bonham recommended to Houston that William S. Blount of North Carolina be granted a commission as a captain in the Texas cavalry. On January 11, 1836, Houston recommended to James W. Robinson that Bonham be promoted to major, for "His influence in the army is great, more so than some who `would be generals'". Bonham probably traveled to San Antonio de Béxar and the Alamo with James Bowie and arrived on January 19, 1836. On January 26 he was appointed one of a committee of seven to draft a preamble and resolutions on behalf of the garrison in support of Governor Henry Smith. On February 1 he was an unsuccessful candidate in the election of delegates to represent the Bexar garrison at the Texas constitutional convention.

He was sent by Travis to obtain aid for the garrison at Bexar on about February 16, 1836. He visited Goliad, but the commander of the forces there, James Fannin, was unable to provide assistance. Bonham's inimitable spirit is best described by T. R. Fehrenbach in his Texas opus, Lone Star: A History of Texas and the Texans:

"At the end, the weary Bonham, a lawyer, a Carolinian of exulted family and a friend of Travis, turned his mount around and rode back toward San Antonio. He was told it was useless to throw away his life. He answered back that Buck Travis deserved to know the answer to his appeals, spat upon the ground, and galloped west into his own immortality."

Thus, Bonham returned to the Alamo on March 3, bearing through the Mexican lines a letter from Robert McAlpin Williamson assuring Travis that help was on its way and urging him to hold out. Bonham died in the battle of the Alamo on March 6, 1836, aged 29. He is believed to have died manning one of the cannons in the interior of the Alamo chapel, meaning that he was likely Bayonetted with several others.

== Legacy ==
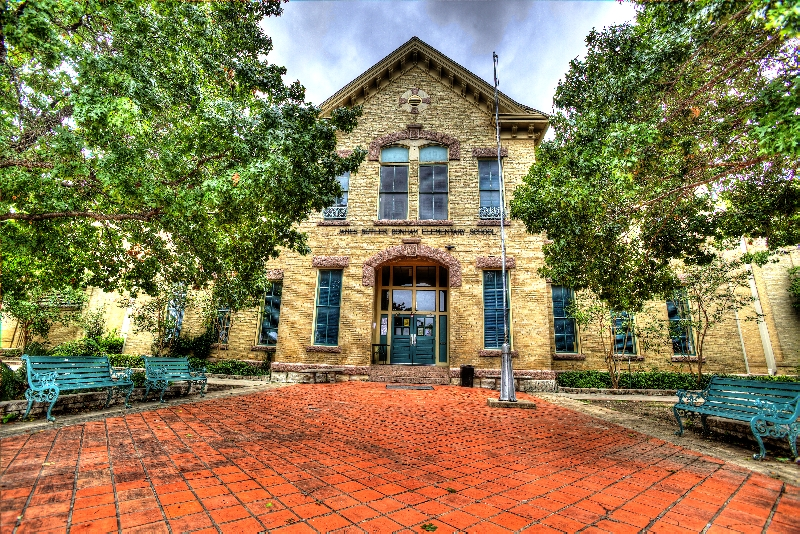
James Butler Bonham Elementary School, San Antonio, Texas

The town of Bonham, Texas, is named for him. Bonham is the county seat of Fannin County, named for the commander who Bonham tried to enjoin for assistance at the Alamo. A 1936 Texas Centennial Marker was placed on the courthouse square in the city of Bonham. The monument displays a statue of Bonham by Texas sculptor Allie Tennant. Many Texas schools are named after James Bonham, for example, in the cities of Abilene, Amarillo, Bryan, Dallas, El Paso, Harlingen, Houston, McAllen, Midland, Odessa, San Angelo, San Antonio, and Temple.

"Flat Grove", Bonham's home in Saluda, is the only known birthplace of an Alamo defender still in existence. It is maintained as a museum. In World War II, the United States Liberty ship SS James B. Bonham was named in his honor.

In Southeastern Conference (SEC) college football, the Texas A&M Aggies and the South Carolina Gamecocks, Bonham's alma mater, began a cross-divisional rivalry in 2014 with the schools competing for the Bonham trophy.

=== Monuments ===
- Alamo Cenotaph, San Antonio, sculptor Pompeo Coppini, east panel of the Cenotaph features a Bonham statue and a statue of James Bowie in front of other Alamo defenders

== See also ==
- Bonham House
- List of Alamo defenders

== Sources ==
- Bonham, William N. (1990). James Butler Bonham: Messenger of Defeat. True North Books.
