= Saluda Theatre =

- U.S. National Register of Historic Places
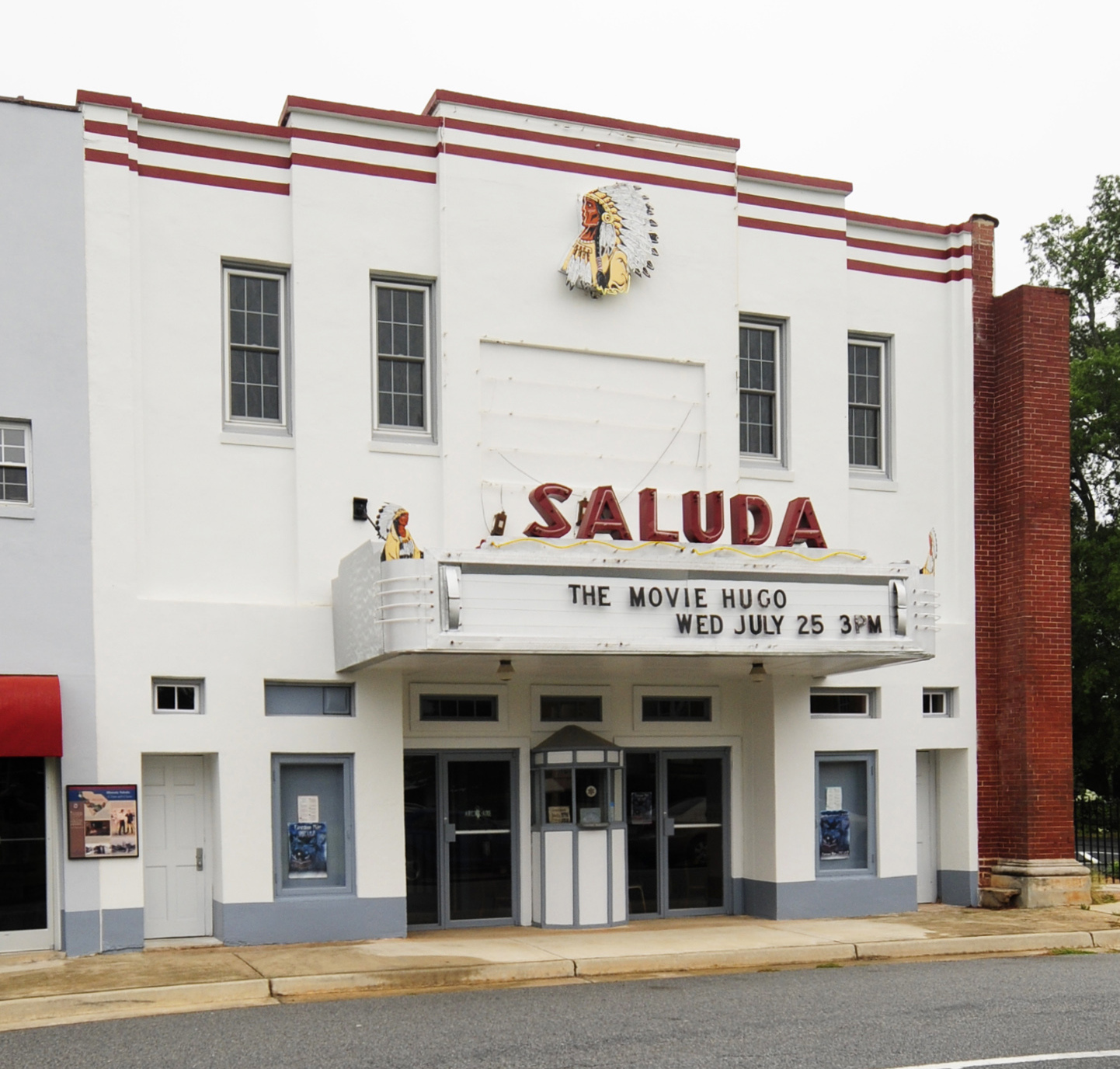
- Saluda Theatre, August 2012

- Location within South Carolina Location within the United States
- Location: 107 Law Range, Saluda, South Carolina
- Coordinates: 34°0′4″N 81°46′16″W
- Area: less than one acre
- Built: 1936
- Architect: Thompson, Charles B.; Bradley, Coke
- Architectural style: Art Deco
- NRHP reference No.: 93001406
- Added to NRHP: December 13, 1993

Saluda Theatre is a historic movie theater located at Saluda, Saluda County, South Carolina. It was built in 1936, and is a two-story, stuccoed masonry building in the Art Deco style. The theater closed in 1981. It was restored after 1987, and is home to the Saluda Players.

It was added to the National Register of Historic Places in 1993.
