= Ward, South Carolina =

- Town
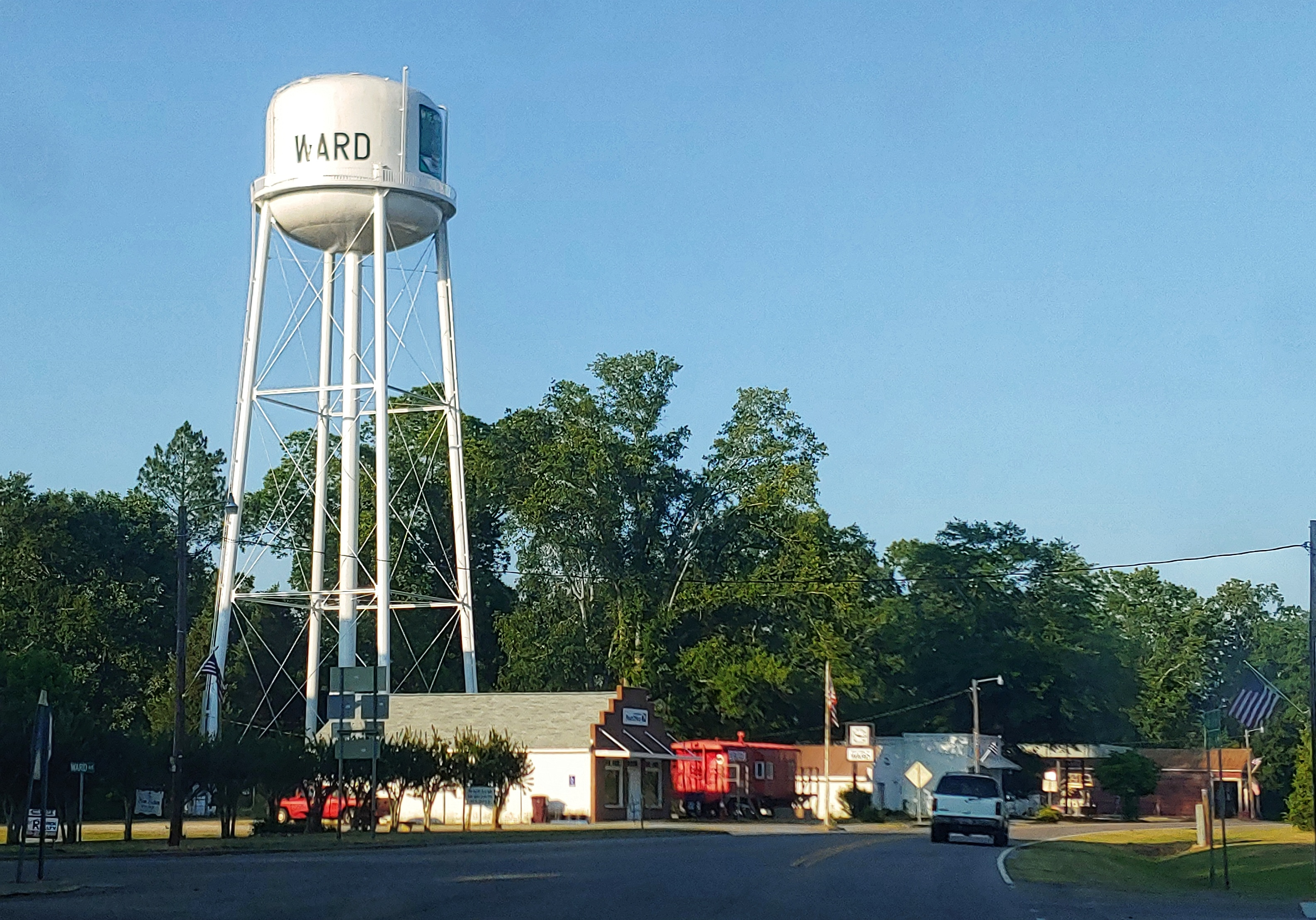

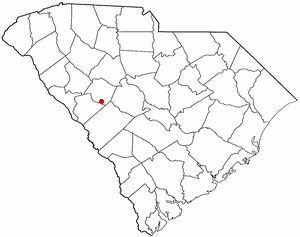
- Location in Saluda County, South Carolina
- Coordinates: 33°51′28″N 81°43′56″W
- Country: United States
- State: South Carolina
- County: Saluda

Area
  - Total: 0.78 sq mi (2.01 km^{2})
  - Land: 0.78 sq mi (2.01 km^{2})
  - Water: 0 sq mi (0.00 km^{2})
- Elevation: 666 ft (203 m)

Population (2020)
  - Total: 119
  - Density: 153.4/sq mi (59.23/km^{2})
- Time zone: UTC-5 (EST)
  - Summer (DST): UTC-4 (EDT)
- ZIP code: 29166
- Area codes: 803, 839
- FIPS code: 45-74590
- GNIS feature ID: 1251321

Ward is a town in Saluda County, South Carolina, United States. As of the 2020 census, Ward had a population of 119.

== History ==
Spann Methodist Church and Cemetery was added to the National Register of Historic Places in 2003.

== Geography ==
According to the United States Census Bureau, the town has a total area of 0.8 square miles (2.1 km^{2}), all land.

Ward is on County Road 23, west of U.S. Route 1, and is just north of the Edgefield County line.

== Demographics ==
Historical population
Census	Pop.	Note	%±
1890	161		—
1900	135		−16.1%
1910	183		35.6%
1920	234		27.9%
1930	233		−0.4%
1940	204		−12.4%
1950	122		−40.2%
1960	162		32.8%
1970	150		−7.4%
1980	98		−34.7%
1990	132		34.7%
2000	110		−16.7%
2010	91		−17.3%
2020	119		30.8%
U.S. Decennial Census

As of the census of 2000, there were 110 people, 51 households, and 27 families residing in the town. The population density was 141.3 inhabitants per square mile (54.6/km^{2}). There were 62 housing units at an average density of 79.7 per square mile (30.8/km^{2}). The racial makeup of the town was 68.18% White and 31.82% Black.

There were 51 households, out of which 27.5% had children under the age of 18 living in them, 39.2% were married couples living together, 11.8% had a female householder with no husband present, and 45.1% were non-families. 45.1% of all households were made up of individuals, and 33.3% had someone living alone who was 65 years of age or older. The average household size was 2.16 and the average family size was 3.07.

In the town, the population was spread out, with 21.8% under the age of 18, 6.4% from 18 to 24, 28.2% from 25 to 44, 21.8% from 45 to 64, and 21.8% who were 65 years of age or older. The median age was 40 years. For every 100 females, there were 77.4 males. For every 100 females age 18 and over, there were 75.5 males.

The median income for a household in the town was $21,000, and the median income for a family was $41,250. Males had a median income of $31,667 versus $23,594 for females. The per capita income for the town was $13,026. There were 23.1% of families and 15.3% of the population living below the poverty line, including 15.8% of under eighteens and 21.1% of those over 64.

== Education ==
It is within the Aiken County Public School District. Areas of the district in Saluda County are zoned to Ridge Spring-Monetta Elementary School and Ridge Spring-Monetta Middle-High School.
