= Saluda, South Carolina =

- Town
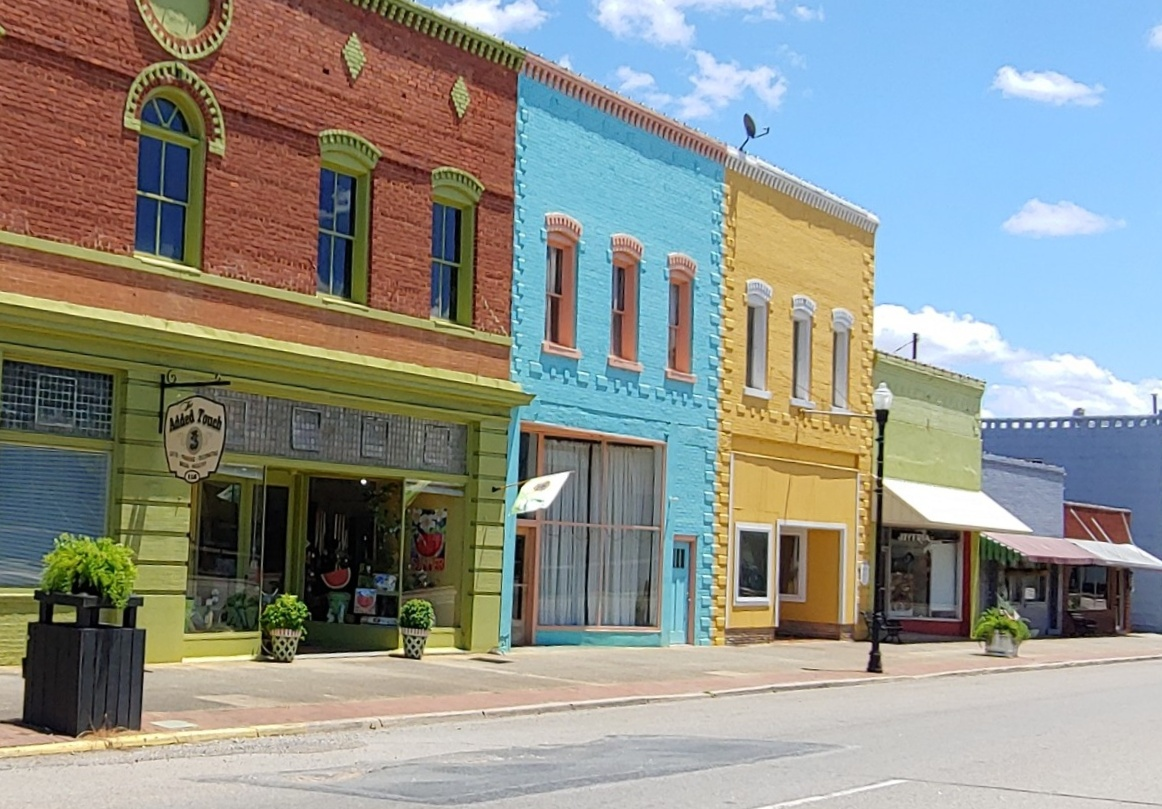
- Downtown Saluda

- Seal

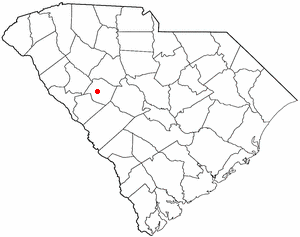
- Location in Saluda County, South Carolina
- Coordinates: 34°0′11″N 81°46′18″W
- Country: United States
- State: South Carolina
- County: Saluda
- Named for: Saluda County, South Carolina

Area
  - Total: 3.29 sq mi (8.52 km^{2})
  - Land: 3.25 sq mi (8.41 km^{2})
  - Water: 0.042 sq mi (0.11 km^{2})
- Elevation: 479 ft (146 m)

Population (2020)
  - Total: 3,122
  - Density: 961.0/sq mi (371.05/km^{2})
- Time zone: UTC-5 (EST)
  - Summer (DST): UTC-4 (EDT)
- ZIP code: 29138
- Area codes: 864, 821
- FIPS code: 45-63250
- GNIS feature ID: 1250737<update needed>
- Website: www.townofsaluda.com

Saluda is a town in Saluda County, South Carolina, United States, along the Little Saluda River. As of the 2020 census, Saluda had a population of 3,122. It is the county seat of Saluda County.

== Geography ==
According to the United States Census Bureau, the town has a total area of 3.3 square miles (8.5 km^{2}), of which 3.2 square miles (8.3 km^{2}) is land and 0.04 square miles (0.10 km^{2}) (1.22%) is water.

=== Climate ===
According to the Köppen Climate Classification system, Saluda has a humid subtropical climate, abbreviated "Cfa" on climate maps. The hottest temperature recorded in Saluda was 109 °F (42.8 °C) on September 1, 1912, July 14, 1980, June 30, 2012, and July 1, 2012, while the coldest temperature recorded was −2 °F (−18.9 °C) on January 21–22, 1985.

Climate data for Saluda, South Carolina, 1991–2020 normals, extremes 1902–present
Month	Jan	Feb	Mar	Apr	May	Jun	Jul	Aug	Sep	Oct	Nov	Dec	Year
Record high °F (°C)	83 (28)	84 (29)	92 (33)	98 (37)	103 (39)	109 (43)	109 (43)	108 (42)	109 (43)	101 (38)	92 (33)	81 (27)	109 (43)
Mean maximum °F (°C)	71.0 (21.7)	75.3 (24.1)	82.5 (28.1)	88.2 (31.2)	93.2 (34.0)	98.3 (36.8)	99.9 (37.7)	99.5 (37.5)	95.2 (35.1)	87.4 (30.8)	79.1 (26.2)	72.3 (22.4)	101.3 (38.5)
Mean daily maximum °F (°C)	53.9 (12.2)	58.5 (14.7)	66.4 (19.1)	75.4 (24.1)	82.8 (28.2)	89.3 (31.8)	92.6 (33.7)	90.8 (32.7)	85.1 (29.5)	75.1 (23.9)	64.1 (17.8)	56.3 (13.5)	74.2 (23.4)
Daily mean °F (°C)	42.8 (6.0)	46.3 (7.9)	53.3 (11.8)	61.9 (16.6)	70.3 (21.3)	77.9 (25.5)	81.4 (27.4)	79.9 (26.6)	73.7 (23.2)	62.4 (16.9)	51.5 (10.8)	45.0 (7.2)	62.2 (16.8)
Mean daily minimum °F (°C)	31.7 (−0.2)	34.2 (1.2)	40.2 (4.6)	48.3 (9.1)	57.8 (14.3)	66.5 (19.2)	70.2 (21.2)	69.0 (20.6)	62.4 (16.9)	49.8 (9.9)	39.0 (3.9)	33.8 (1.0)	50.2 (10.1)
Mean minimum °F (°C)	16.4 (−8.7)	20.2 (−6.6)	24.6 (−4.1)	32.9 (0.5)	43.2 (6.2)	56.1 (13.4)	63.0 (17.2)	60.5 (15.8)	49.6 (9.8)	34.2 (1.2)	25.3 (−3.7)	20.8 (−6.2)	14.5 (−9.7)
Record low °F (°C)	−2 (−19)	7 (−14)	5 (−15)	21 (−6)	32 (0)	43 (6)	50 (10)	50 (10)	35 (2)	21 (−6)	12 (−11)	1 (−17)	−2 (−19)
Average precipitation inches (mm)	4.09 (104)	3.82 (97)	4.57 (116)	3.07 (78)	3.49 (89)	4.18 (106)	4.28 (109)	4.50 (114)	3.97 (101)	3.22 (82)	3.36 (85)	4.25 (108)	46.80 (1,189)
Average snowfall inches (cm)	0.0 (0.0)	0.0 (0.0)	0.2 (0.51)	0.0 (0.0)	0.0 (0.0)	0.0 (0.0)	0.0 (0.0)	0.0 (0.0)	0.0 (0.0)	0.0 (0.0)	0.1 (0.25)	0.1 (0.25)	0.4 (1.01)
Average precipitation days (≥ 0.01 in)	11.0	9.7	9.8	8.5	7.8	10.0	10.5	9.3	7.4	6.8	7.9	10.5	109.2
Average snowy days (≥ 0.1 in)	0.0	0.0	0.1	0.0	0.0	0.0	0.0	0.0	0.0	0.0	0.1	0.0	0.2
Source 1: NOAA
Source 2: National Weather Service

== Demographics ==
Historical population
Census	Pop.	Note	%±
1900	289		—
1910	610		111.1%
1920	1,203		97.2%
1930	1,381		14.8%
1940	1,516		9.8%
1950	1,594		5.1%
1960	2,089		31.1%
1970	2,442		16.9%
1980	2,752		12.7%
1990	2,798		1.7%
2000	3,066		9.6%
2010	3,565		16.3%
2020	3,122		−12.4%
U.S. Decennial Census

=== 2020 census ===
As of the 2020 census, Saluda had a population of 3,122, with 1,169 households and 756 families residing in the town. The median age was 34.9 years. 29.0% of residents were under the age of 18 and 16.2% of residents were 65 years of age or older. For every 100 females there were 92.2 males, and for every 100 females age 18 and over there were 91.3 males age 18 and over.

0.0% of residents lived in urban areas, while 100.0% lived in rural areas.

Of the town's households, 38.1% had children under the age of 18 living in them. Of all households, 34.9% were married-couple households, 21.0% were households with a male householder and no spouse or partner present, and 39.5% were households with a female householder and no spouse or partner present. About 30.5% of all households were made up of individuals and 14.8% had someone living alone who was 65 years of age or older.

There were 1,312 housing units, of which 10.9% were vacant. The homeowner vacancy rate was 2.8% and the rental vacancy rate was 4.9%.

Saluda racial composition
Race	Num.	Perc.
White (non-Hispanic)	782	25.05%
Black or African American (non-Hispanic)	963	30.85%
Native American	6	0.19%
Asian	7	0.22%
Other/Mixed	89	2.85%
Hispanic or Latino	1,275	40.84%

=== 2000 census ===
As of the census of 2000, there were 3,066 people, 1,103 households, and 788 families residing in the town. The population density was 947.1 inhabitants per square mile (365.7/km^{2}). There were 1,211 housing units at an average density of 374.1 per square mile (144.4/km^{2}). The racial makeup of the town was 48.76% White, 40.48% African American, 0.23% Native American, 9.95% from other races, and 0.59% from two or more races. Hispanic or Latino of any race were 19.37% of the population.

There were 1,103 households, out of which 33.6% had children under the age of 18 living with them, 40.8% were married couples living together, 24.6% had a female householder with no husband present, and 28.5% were non-families. 24.5% of all households were made up of individuals, and 11.4% had someone living alone who was 65 years of age or older. The average household size was 2.75 and the average family size was 3.21.

In the town, the population was spread out, with 28.0% under the age of 18, 12.2% from 18 to 24, 28.1% from 25 to 44, 18.6% from 45 to 64, and 13.1% who were 65 years of age or older. The median age was 31 years. For every 100 females, there were 97.9 males. For every 100 females age 18 and over, there were 93.9 males.

The median income for a household in the town was $26,964, and the median income for a family was $31,042. Males had a median income of $25,208 versus $19,921 for females. The per capita income for the town was $13,032. About 22.9% of families and 28.5% of the population were below the poverty line, including 37.4% of those under age 18 and 18.5% of those age 65 or over.

== History ==
Prior to the formation of Saluda County in 1896, the town was named Redbank and was renamed to match the county it became the seat of.

The Bonham House, Butler Family Cemetery, Marsh-Johnson House, Old Strother Place, Saluda Old Town Site, Saluda Theatre, Stevens-Dorn Farmstead, and Whitehall are listed on the National Register of Historic Places.

== Education ==
It is in the Saluda County School District. Saluda County School District includes five public schools: Hollywood Elementary, Saluda Primary, Saluda Elementary, Saluda Middle, and Saluda High School. It also has a private school known as W. Wyman Kings Academy; and two other public schools, Saluda Opportunity School, and Saluda County Adult Education. It has a college center which is Piedmont Technical College Saluda County Center. Based on the information given about fifty-nine percent of the students enrolled in the district during the years 2018-2022 were white, twenty-two percent of the students were Black or African American, twenty-one percent of the students were Hispanic or Latino, one percent were American Indian/ Alaska Native and the rest were some other race or more than one race. About sixty-six percent of the students aged five and above spoke English only at home, and 2.7 percent of the students have a disability.

Saluda has a public library, a branch of the Saluda County Library.

== Notable people ==
- Lyndon Amick, former NASCAR driver turned soldier
- James Bonham, who fought and died at the Battle of the Alamo
- Milledge Luke Bonham, former Governor of South Carolina
- Jonathon Brooks, professional football player with Detroit, Atlanta and St Louis.
- James Butler Hare, (1918–1966) U.S. House of Representatives for South Carolina's 3rd congressional district
- Rudolph Mitchell (1926-2019), politician
- William B. Travis, Texian commander of the Alamo
