= Saluda County, South Carolina =

County in South Carolina, United States

- County
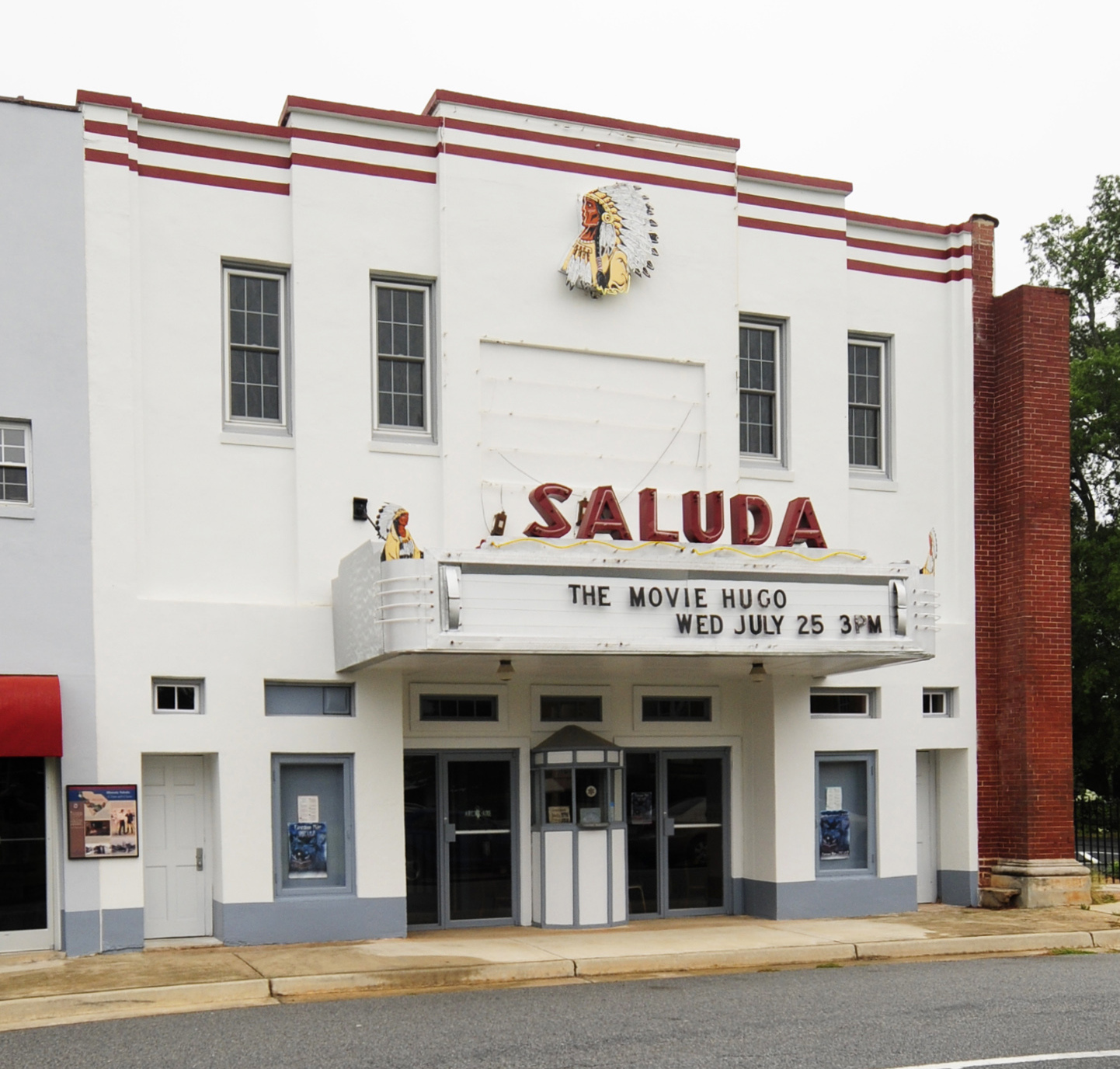
- Saluda Theatre

- Seal

- Location within the U.S. state of South Carolina
- Coordinates: 34.01°N 81.73°W
- Country: United States
- State: South Carolina
- Founded: 1895
- Named for: Saluda River
- Seat: Saluda
- Largest community: Saluda

Area
  - Total: 461.64 sq mi (1,195.6 km^{2})
  - Land: 452.72 sq mi (1,172.5 km^{2})
  - Water: 8.92 sq mi (23.1 km^{2}) 1.93%

Population (2020)
  - Total: 18,862
  - Estimate (2025): 19,680 ▲
  - Density: 41.664/sq mi (16.086/km^{2})
- Time zone: UTC−5 (Eastern)
  - Summer (DST): UTC−4 (EDT)
- Congressional district: 3rd
- Website: saludacounty.sc.gov

Saluda County is a county in the U.S. state of South Carolina. As of the 2020 census, its population was 18,862. Its county seat is Saluda. The county was formed from northern and eastern portions of Edgefield County. Saluda County is part of the Columbia metropolitan statistical area.

== History ==
The county was founded in 1895 with portions of Edgefield County, and was named after the nearby Saluda River. The largest community and county seat is Saluda.

== Geography ==
Interactive map of Saluda County

According to the U.S. Census Bureau, the county has a total area of 461.64 square miles (1,195.6 km^{2}), of which 8.92 square miles (23.1 km^{2}) (1.93%) are covered by water. Saluda County is largely in the Saluda River basin with a small portion of western Saluda in the Savannah River basin.

=== National protected area ===
- Sumter National Forest (part)

=== Major water bodies ===
- Lake Murray
- Saluda River

=== Adjacent counties ===
- Newberry County – north
- Lexington County – east
- Aiken County – south
- Edgefield County – southwest
- Greenwood County – northwest
- McCormick County – west

=== Major highways ===
- US 1
- US 178
- US 178 Conn.
- US 378
- SC 23
- SC 39
- SC 121
- SC 193
- SC 194
- SC 391
- SC 395
- SC 702

=== Major infrastructure ===
- Saluda County Airport

== Demographics ==
Historical population
Census	Pop.	Note	%±
1900	18,966		—
1910	20,943		10.4%
1920	22,088		5.5%
1930	18,148		−17.8%
1940	17,192		−5.3%
1950	15,924		−7.4%
1960	14,554		−8.6%
1970	14,528		−0.2%
1980	16,150		11.2%
1990	16,357		1.3%
2000	19,181		17.3%
2010	19,875		3.6%
2020	18,862		−5.1%
2025 (est.)	19,680	▲	4.3%
U.S. Decennial Census; 1790–1960 1900–1990; 1990–2000 2010 2020

=== Racial and ethnic composition ===
Saluda County, South Carolina – Racial and ethnic composition Note: the US Census treats Hispanic/Latino as an ethnic category. This table excludes Latinos from the racial categories and assigns them to a separate category. Hispanics/Latinos may be of any race.
Race / Ethnicity (NH = Non-Hispanic)	Pop 1980	Pop 1990	Pop 2000	Pop 2010	Pop 2020	% 1980	% 1990	% 2000	% 2010	% 2020
White alone (NH)	16,355	14,287	11,936	11,548	11,264	51.70%	48.66%	62.23%	58.10%	59.72%
Black or African American alone (NH)	14,481	14,222	5,707	5,196	4,028	45.78%	48.44%	29.75%	26.14%	21.36%
Native American or Alaska Native alone (NH)	489	732	44	43	44	1.55%	2.49%	0.23%	0.22%	0.23%
Asian alone (NH)	24	25	7	36	35	0.08%	0.09%	0.04%	0.18%	0.19%
Native Hawaiian or Pacific Islander alone (NH)	x	x	0	11	0	x	x	0.00%	0.06%	0.00%
Other race alone (NH)	0	16	2	10	77	0.00%	0.05%	0.01%	0.05%	0.20%
Mixed race or Multiracial (NH)	x	x	84	174	441	x	x	0.44%	0.88%	2.34%
Hispanic or Latino (any race)	285	79	1,401	2,857	3,012	0.90%	0.27%	7.30%	14.37%	15.97%
Total	31,634	29,361	19,181	19,875	18,862	100.00%	100.00%	100.00%	100.00%	100.00%

=== 2020 census ===
As of the 2020 census, the county had a population of 18,862, and the median age was 44.6 years. 21.9% of residents were under the age of 18 and 22.3% of residents were 65 years of age or older. For every 100 females there were 98.4 males, and for every 100 females age 18 and over there were 96.6 males age 18 and over. The census also counted 5,132 families in the county.

The racial makeup of the county was 61.9% White, 21.6% Black or African American, 0.9% American Indian and Alaska Native, 0.2% Asian, 0.0% Native Hawaiian and Pacific Islander, 8.0% from some other race, and 7.4% from two or more races. Hispanic or Latino residents of any race comprised 16.0% of the population.

1.4% of residents lived in urban areas, while 98.6% lived in rural areas.

There were 7,549 households in the county, of which 28.7% had children under the age of 18 living with them and 27.1% had a female householder with no spouse or partner present. About 27.5% of all households were made up of individuals and 13.8% had someone living alone who was 65 years of age or older. There were 9,267 housing units, of which 18.5% were vacant. Among occupied housing units, 75.2% were owner-occupied and 24.8% were renter-occupied. The homeowner vacancy rate was 1.1% and the rental vacancy rate was 5.7%.

=== 2010 census ===
At the 2010 census, 19,875 people, 7,527 households, and 5,393 families were living in the county. The population density was 43.9 inhabitants per square mile (16.9/km^{2}). The 9,289 housing units had an average density of 20.5 per square mile (7.9/km^{2}). The racial makeup of the county was 61.1% White, 26.3% Black or African American, 0.4% American Indian, 0.3% Pacific Islander, 0.2% Asian, 10.3% from other races, and 1.4% from two or more races. Those of Hispanic or Latino origin made up 14.4% of the population. In terms of ancestry, 17.8% were American, 14.7% were German, 8.6% were English, and 8.2% were Irish.

Of the 7,527 households, 32.5% had children under 18 living with them, 50.6% were married couples living together, 15.0% had a female householder with no husband present, 28.4% were not families, and 24.2% of all households were made up of individuals. The average household size was 2.61 and the average family size was 3.05. The median age was 39.6 years.

The median income for a household in the county was $40,508 and for a family was $45,173. Males had a median income of $31,264 versus $28,344 for females. The per capita income for the county was $18,717. About 11.7% of families and 15.1% of the population were below the poverty line, including 19.4% of those under 18 and 15.0% of those 65 or over.

=== 2000 census ===
At the 2000 census, 19,181 people, 7,127 households, and 5,295 families lived in the county. The population density was 42 people per square mile (16 people/km^{2}). The 8,543 housing units had an average density of 19 per square mile (7.3/km^{2}). The racial makeup of the county was 65.80% White, 29.99% Black or African American, 0.23% Native American, 0.04% Asian, 3.30% from other races, and 0.64% from two or more races. About 7.30% of the population were Hispanic or Latino of any race.

Of the 7,127 households, 31.8% had children under 18 living with them, 54.2% were married couples living together, 14.5% had a female householder with no husband present, and 25.7% were not families. About 22.5% of all households were made up of individuals, and 10.4% had someone living alone who was 65 or older. The average household size was 2.65 and the average family size was 3.07.

In the county, the age distribution was 24.9% under 18, 9.20% from 18 to 24, 27.60% from 25 to 44, 23.80% from 45 to 64, and 14.50% who were 65 or older. The median age was 37 years. For every 100 females, there were 98.60 males. For every 100 females 18 and over, there were 95.30 males.

The median income for a household in the county was $35,774, and for a family was $41,603. Males had a median income of $29,221 versus $21,395 for females. The per capita income for the county was $16,328. About 12.00% of families and 15.60% of the population were below the poverty line, including 21.4% of those under 18 and 16.3% of those 65 or over.

== Law and government ==
=== Law enforcement ===
In 2012, Saluda County Sheriff Jason Booth pled guilty to charges of misuse of office after using an inmate to make improvements at his home.

=== Politics ===
Saluda County has been a Republican stronghold since 1984, increasingly so in recent elections. The 2024 election saw the strongest Republican support in the county since Nixon's 1972 landslide.

United States presidential election results for Saluda County, South Carolina
Year	Republican		Democratic		Third party(ies)	
Year	No.	%	No.	%	No.	%
1900	7	0.55%	1,269	99.45%	0	0.00%
1904	7	0.74%	938	99.26%	0	0.00%
1912	0	0.00%	850	98.04%	17	1.96%
1916	1	0.08%	1,227	99.51%	5	0.41%
1920	3	0.27%	1,111	99.55%	2	0.18%
1924	3	0.27%	1,094	99.55%	2	0.18%
1928	5	0.62%	796	99.38%	0	0.00%
1932	7	0.53%	1,307	99.47%	0	0.00%
1936	10	0.75%	1,324	99.25%	0	0.00%
1940	15	1.33%	1,115	98.67%	0	0.00%
1944	14	1.30%	924	85.56%	142	13.15%
1948	15	0.78%	187	9.77%	1,712	89.45%
1952	1,396	46.72%	1,592	53.28%	0	0.00%
1956	341	14.92%	1,080	47.24%	865	37.84%
1960	1,268	48.38%	1,353	51.62%	0	0.00%
1964	2,524	64.17%	1,409	35.83%	0	0.00%
1968	1,466	30.53%	1,200	24.99%	2,136	44.48%
1972	3,095	73.85%	1,022	24.39%	74	1.77%
1976	2,085	43.09%	2,715	56.11%	39	0.81%
1980	2,450	47.40%	2,651	51.29%	68	1.32%
1984	3,515	63.90%	1,962	35.67%	24	0.44%
1988	3,225	61.64%	1,984	37.92%	23	0.44%
1992	2,968	47.80%	2,393	38.54%	848	13.66%
1996	2,825	49.56%	2,486	43.61%	389	6.82%
2000	4,098	59.47%	2,682	38.92%	111	1.61%
2004	4,537	59.87%	3,001	39.60%	40	0.53%
2008	5,191	60.34%	3,323	38.63%	89	1.03%
2012	5,135	59.96%	3,328	38.86%	101	1.18%
2016	5,526	64.53%	2,813	32.85%	225	2.63%
2020	6,210	66.96%	2,963	31.95%	101	1.09%
2024	6,452	71.58%	2,454	27.22%	108	1.20%

== Economy ==
In 2022, the gross domestic product (GDP) was $572.2 million (about $29,921 per capita), and the real GDP was $495.6 million (about $25,918 per capita) in chained 2017 dollars.

As of April 2024, some of the top employers of the county include Food Lion.

Employment and Wage Statistics by Industry in Saluda County, South Carolina - Q3 2023
Industry	Employment counts	Percentage (%)	Average annual wage ($)
Accommodation and Food Services	208	4.6	14,872
Administrative and Support and Waste Management and Remediation Services	42	0.9	37,076
Agriculture, Forestry, Fishing and Hunting	443	9.9	53,040
Arts, Entertainment, and Recreation	62	1.4	26,208
Construction	136	3.0	44,980
Finance and Insurance	48	1.1	58,448
Health Care and Social Assistance	591	13.2	39,780
Manufacturing	1,921	42.9	49,868
Other Services (except Public Administration)	68	1.5	47,060
Professional, Scientific, and Technical Services	107	2.4	47,892
Public Administration	336	7.5	44,044
Real Estate and Rental and Leasing	24	0.5	38,948
Retail Trade	295	6.6	28,652
Transportation and Warehousing	67	1.5	54,912
Utilities	33	0.7	69,680
Wholesale Trade	96	2.1	52,572
Total	4,477	100.0%	45,016

== Communities ==
=== Towns ===
- Batesburg-Leesville (mostly in Lexington County)
- Monetta (mostly in Aiken County)
- Ridge Spring
- Saluda (county seat and largest community)
- Ward

=== Unincorporated communities ===
- Mount Willing

== Education ==
School districts covering sections of the county include:

- Saluda County School District
- Aiken County School District
- Lexington School District 3

== Notable person ==
- William B. Travis, Texas lieutenant colonel leading defense in the Battle of the Alamo

== See also ==
- List of counties in South Carolina
- National Register of Historic Places listings in Saluda County, South Carolina
