= List of cemeteries in South Carolina =

This list of cemeteries in South Carolina includes currently operating, historical (closed for new interments), and defunct (graves abandoned or removed) cemeteries, columbaria, and mausolea which are historical and/or notable. It does not include pet cemeteries.

== Abbeville County ==
- Lindsay Cemetery in Due West; NRHP-listed
- Patrick Calhoun Family Cemetery near Abbeville; NRHP-listed
- Trinity Episcopal Church and Cemetery in Abbeville; NRHP-listed
- Upper Long Cane Cemetery in Abbeville; NRHP-listed

== Aiken County ==
- Aiken Colored Cemetery in Aiken; NRHP-listed
- Zubly Cemetery in Beech Island; NRHP-listed

== Barnwell County ==
- Cemetery at Church of the Holy Apostles in Barnwell; NRHP-listed

== Beaufort County ==
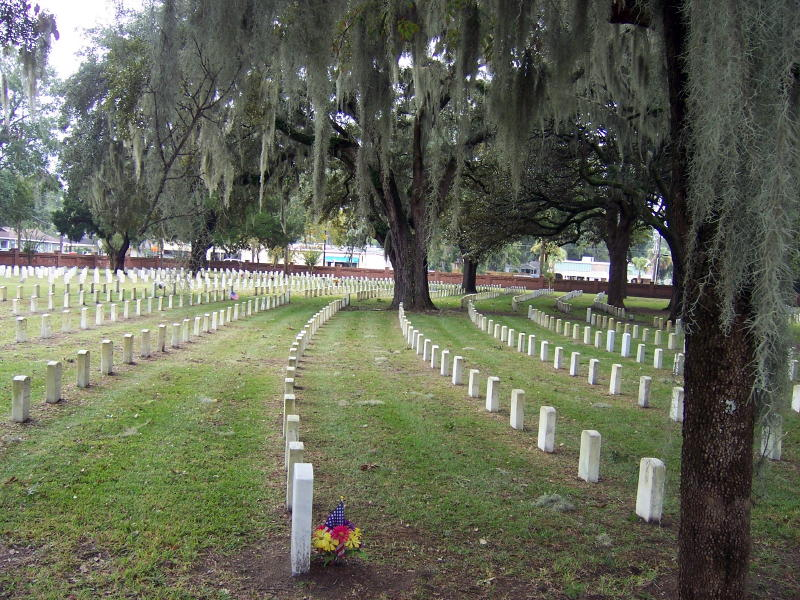
BBeaufort National Cemetery in Beaufort, Beaufort County

- Beaufort National Cemetery in Beaufort; NRHP-listed
- Edgar Fripp Mausoleum, St. Helena Island Parish Church in Frogmore; NRHP-listed
- St. Luke's Parish Zion Chapel of Ease Cemetery in Hilton Head Island; NRHP-listed

== Charleston County ==
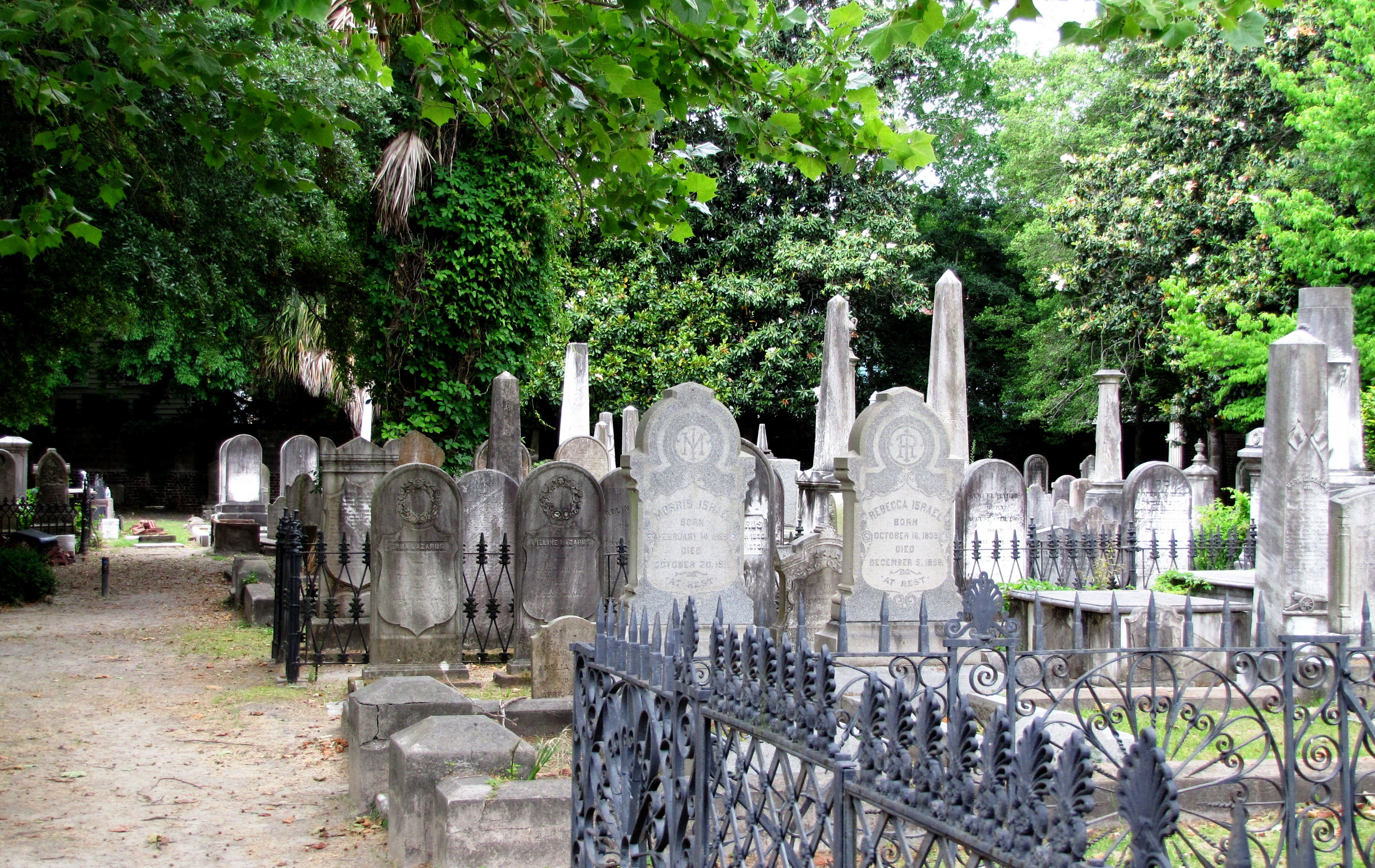
Coming Street Cemetery (2010) in Charleston, Charleston County; established by the city's Jewish community in 1762

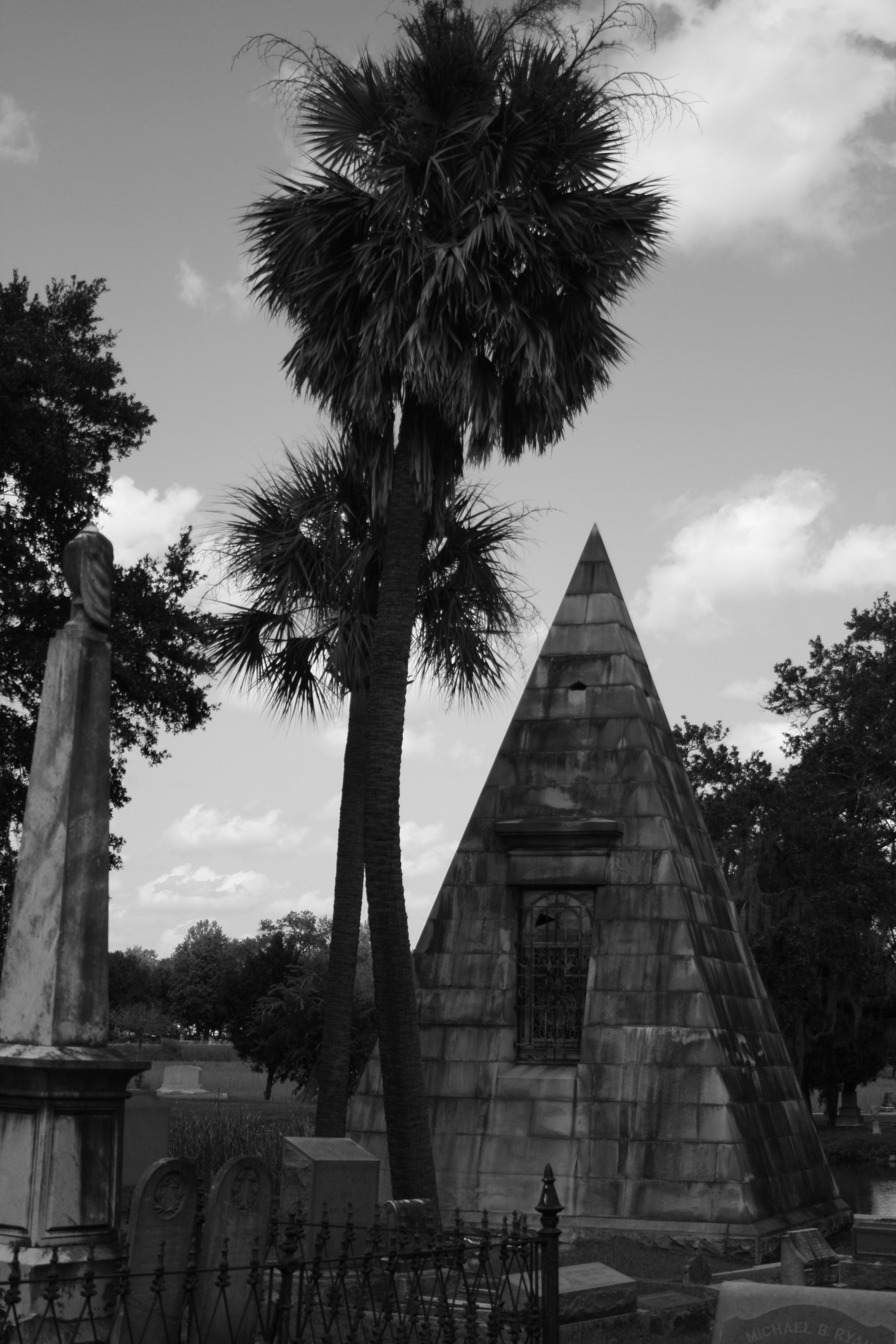
Magnolia Cemetery in Charleston, Charleston County

- Coming Street Cemetery in Charleston; NRHP-listed
- Cook's Old Field Cemetery near Mount Pleasant; NRHP-listed
- Charleston Cemeteries Historic District in Charleston, complex contains 23 cemeteries; NRHP-listed
- King Cemetery near Adams Run; NRHP-listed
- Lawton-Seabrook Cemetery in Edisto Island; NRHP-listed
- Lucas Family Cemetery near Mount Pleasant; NRHP-listed
- Magnolia Cemetery in Charleston; NRHP-listed
- Remley Point Cemetery in Mt. Pleasant; NRHP-listed
- St. Michael's Churchyard in Charleston

== Chesterfield County ==
- St. David's Episcopal Church and Cemetery in Cheraw; NRHP-listed

== Cleveland County ==
- Shiloh Presbyterian Church Cemetery in Grover; NRHP-listed

== Darlington County ==
- Darlington Memorial Cemetery in Darlington; NRHP-listed
- Magnolia Cemetery in Hartsville; NRHP-listed

== Dorchester County ==
- Old White Meeting House Ruins and Cemetery near Summerville; NRHP-listed

== Florence County ==
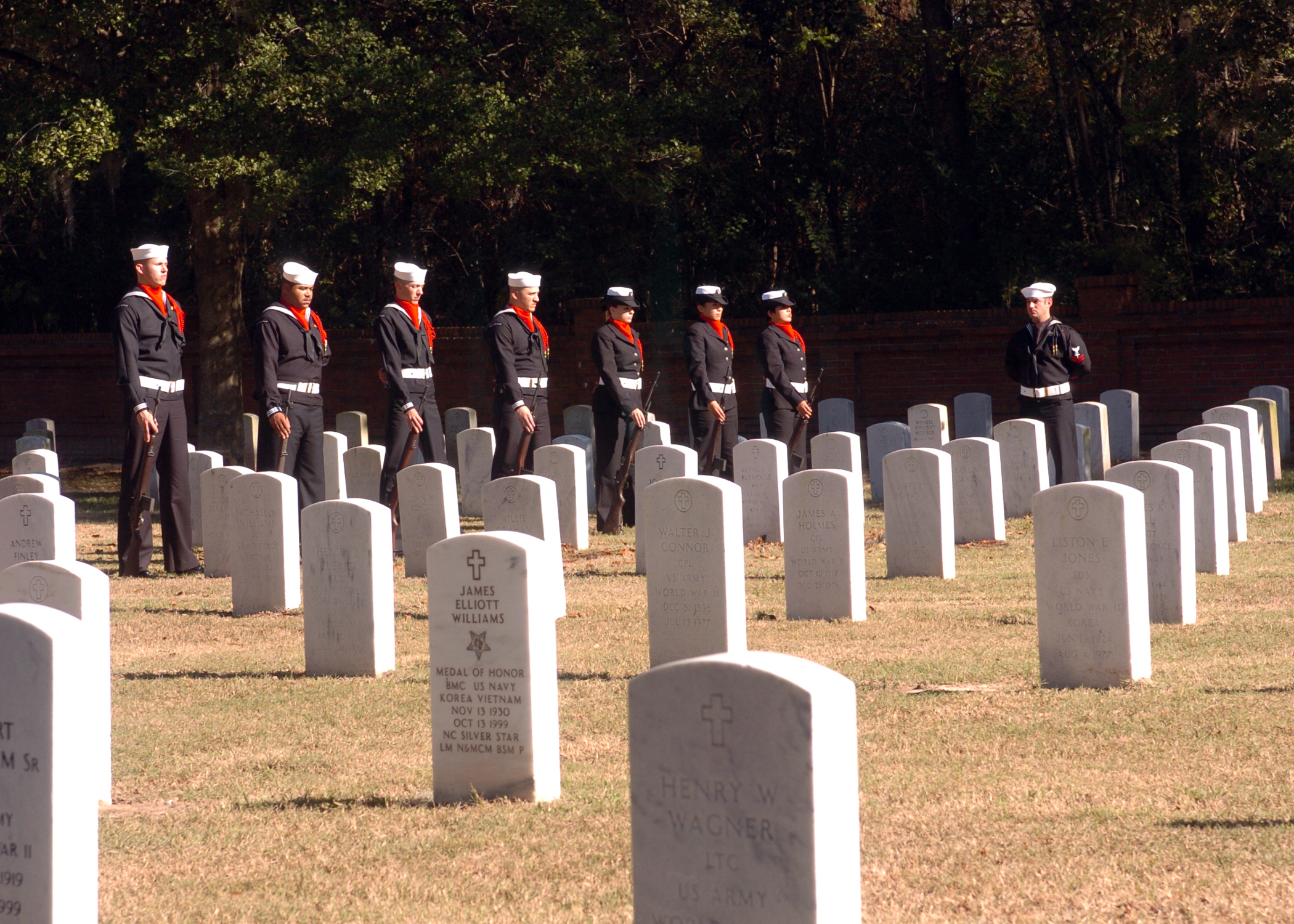
U.S. Navy preparing to fire a salute at Florence National Cemetery in Florence

- Florence National Cemetery in Florence; NRHP-listed
- Hopewell Presbyterian Church and Hopewell Cemetery in Florence; NRHP-listed

== Greenville County ==
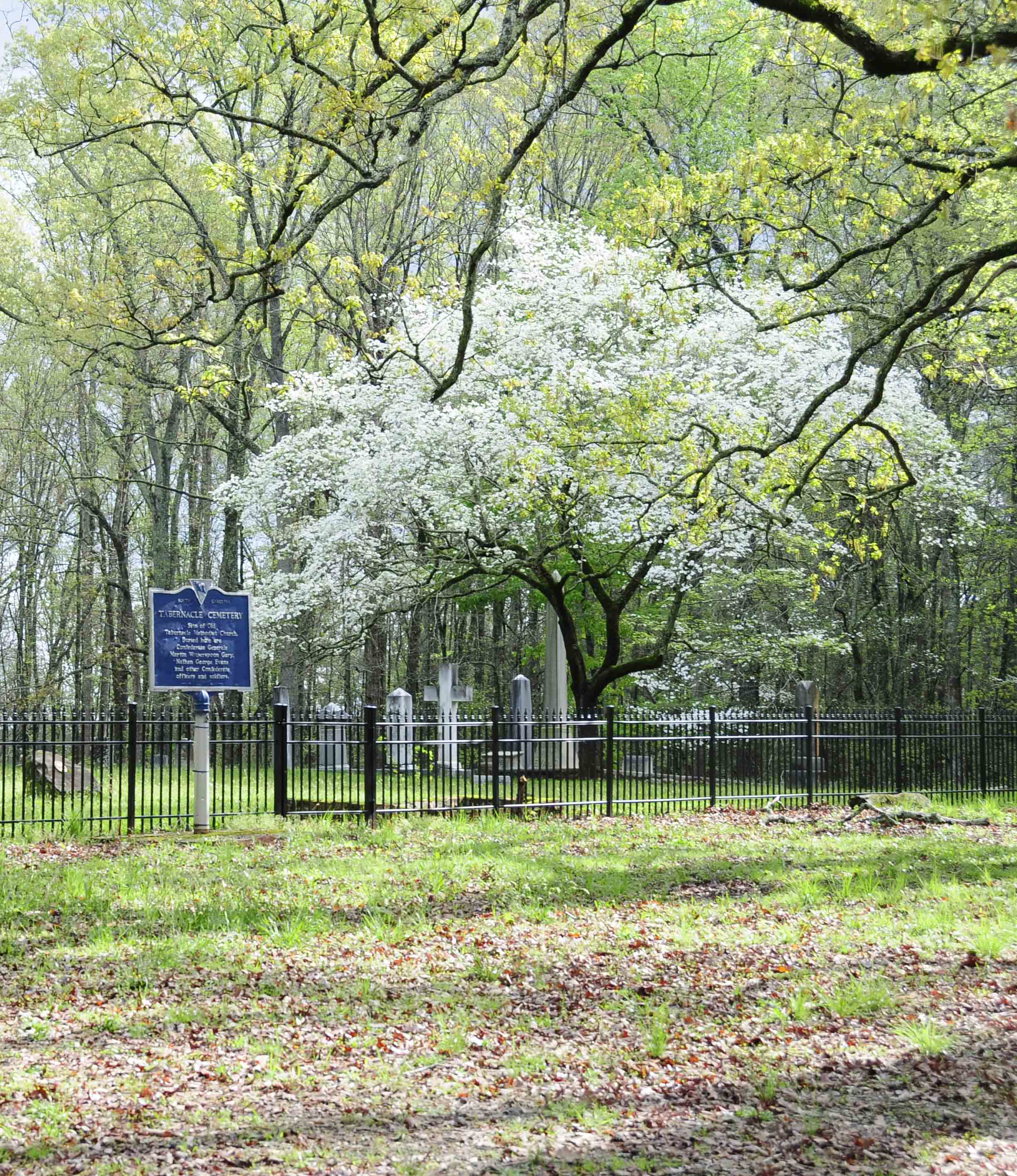
Tabernacle Cemetery in Greenwood, Greenwood County

- Old Pilgrim Baptist Church Cemetery and Kilgore Family Cemetery in Five Forks; NRHP-listed
- Magnolia Cemetery in Greenwood; NRHP-listed
- Old Greenwood Cemetery in Greenwood; NRHP-listed
- Springwood Cemetery in Greenville; NRHP-listed
- Richland Cemetery in Greenville; NRHP-listed
- Tabernacle Cemetery in Greenwood; NRHP-listed

== Horry County ==
- Hebron Church in Bucksville; NRHP-listed
- Kingston Presbyterian Church Cemetery in Conway; NRHP-listed

== Kershaw County ==
- Old Quaker Cemetery in Camden

== Lancaster County ==
- Waxhaw Presbyterian Church Cemetery near Lancaster; NRHP-listed

== McCormick County ==
- Long Cane Associate Reformed Presbyterian Church in Troy

== Newberry County ==
- Prosperity Cemetery near Prosperity; NRHP-listed

== Orangeburg County ==
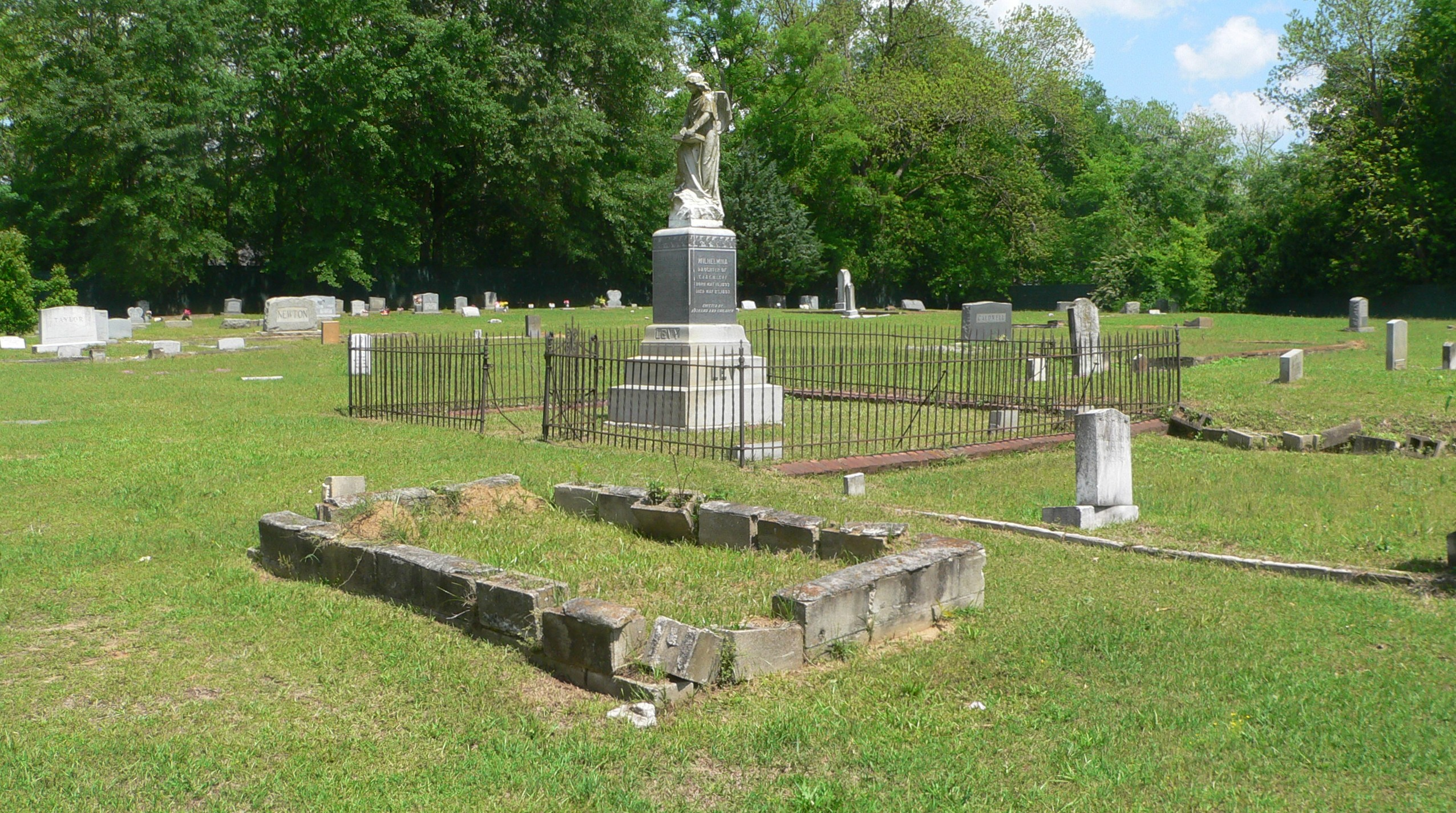
Orangeburg City Cemetery in Orangeburg, Orangeburg County

- Orangeburg City Cemetery in Orangeburg; NRHP-listed

== Pickens County ==
- Old Stone Church and Cemetery in Clemson; NRHP-listed
- Oolenoy Baptist Church Cemetery near Pickens; NRHP-listed

== Richland County ==
- Elmwood Cemetery in Columbia; NRHP-listed
- Fort Jackson National Cemetery in Columbia
- Memorial Gardens of Columbia in Columbia
- Hopkins Family Cemetery in Hopkins; NRHP-listed
- Randolph Cemetery in Columbia; NRHP-listed
- Sandfield Cemetery in Blythewood
- Cemetery at Trinity Episcopal Cathedral in Columbia; NRHP-listed

== Saluda County ==
- Butler Family Cemetery in Saluda; NRHP-listed
- Spann Methodist Church and Cemetery in Ward; NRHP-listed

== Sumter County ==
- Church of the Holy Cross in Stateburg; NRHP-listed
- Cemetery at St. Mark's Episcopal Church in High Hills of Santee; NRHP-listed
- Cemetery at St. Philip's Episcopal Church in Dalzell; NRHP-listed
- Singleton's Graveyard in High Hills of Santee; NRHP-listed
- Stateburg Historic District in High Hills of Santee; NRHP-listed

== York County ==
- Laurelwood Cemetery in Rock Hill; NRHP-listed
- Spratt Cemetery in near Fort Mill; NRHP-listed

== See also ==
- List of cemeteries in the United States
