= Fort Moore =

Fort Moore may refer to:

- Fort Moore (California), a historic military post established during the Mexican–American War
- Fort Moore (Georgia), the name used during 2023–2025 for Fort Benning
- Fort Moore Pioneer Memorial, a monument located in Los Angeles
- Fort Moore-Savano Town Site, located near Aiken, South Carolina
- Fort Moore, an 18th-century settlement at Savannah Town, South Carolina

== See also ==
- Camp Moore, a historic Confederate military camp in Louisiana
- Moore's Fort, a historic building in Round Top, Texas
