= Sandfield Cemetery =

Sandfield Cemetery may refer to:

- Sandfield Cemetery (Columbus, Mississippi), African-American cemetery founded in the late 19th-century.
- Sandfield Cemetery (Richland County, South Carolina), Baptist cemetery founded c. 1772.
