= CCHD =

CCHD may refer to:

- Catholic Campaign for Human Development, the national anti-poverty and social justice program of the United States Conference of Catholic Bishops
- Charleston Cemeteries Historic District, a cluster of 23 cemeteries north of downtown Charleston, South Carolina
- Cyanotic heart disease, also called critical congenital heart disease
