= Christ Our King-Stella Maris School =

Private Catholic school in Mount Pleasant, South Carolina, USa

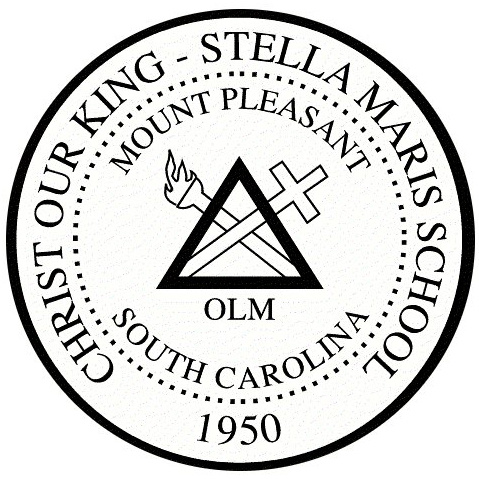

Location
- 1183 Russell Drive; Mount Pleasant, South Carolina 29464; United States; 32.795°N 79.863°W

Information
- School type: Parish, Private, Coeducational
- Religious affiliation: Roman Catholic
- Established: 1950
- Founder: Fr. John Lawrence McLaughlin
- Authority: Bishop of Charleston
- Oversight: Diocese of Charleston
- Superintendent: Sandra Leatherwood
- President: John Byrnes
- Rector: Fr. Robert Spencer
- Principal: Charlotte Funston
- Teaching staff: 44
- Grades: Pre-K–8
- Hours in school day: 7
- Classrooms: 38
- Campus: Suburban
- Campus size: 7 acres
- Colors: Navy blue and White
- Slogan: Where Tradition and Innovation Unite
- Athletics: 20+ teams across all grade levels
- Mascot: Crusaders
- Nickname: COKSM
- Rival: Blessed Sacrament Catholic School
- Accreditation: Southern Association of Colleges and Schools
- Website: http://www.coksm.org

Christ Our King-Stella Maris School is a Roman Catholic parochial elementary and middle school in Mount Pleasant, South Carolina, serving students in grades K4 through 8th. With an enrollment of over 600, it is the largest Catholic elementary and middle school in the Diocese of Charleston. The school was founded in 1950 and is named for the two original contributing parishes: Christ Our King Catholic Church in Mount Pleasant and Stella Maris Catholic Church on Sullivan's Island.

== History ==
In 1950, Father John Lawrence McLaughlin, pastor of Stella Maris Parish on Sullivan's Island, responded to a growing concern from his parishioners for Catholic education east of the Cooper River. He decided it was time to start a parish school. For the teaching staff he turned to the Sisters of Charity of Our Lady of Mercy in Charleston, and together they began Stella Maris School with 54 students in the kindergarten, first, and second grades. Sisters from the OLM's have been associated with the school ever since.

The original classrooms were in space loaned to McLaughlin from Fort Moultrie, but as early as 1953, with the school having grown to accommodate grades K through 6, it was clear that much more room would be needed. The parishioners began a capital campaign and the cornerstone for a new building was laid that same year on Russell Drive in Mount Pleasant. A wing was added in 1957 and another in 1962, by which time the school had grown to include kindergarten through 8th grade. In 1973, the school was renamed Christ Our King-Stella Maris to reflect both the original parish and the new parish it now served.

Over the next fifteen years the school grew, trying to keep pace with the East Cooper community's expanding Catholic population. However, in 1989 it was the damage from Hurricane Hugo to the school structure that finally provided an opportunity for extensive renovations. Early in 1990, under the leadership of Principal Sister Stella Maris, the decision was made to expand and update Christ Our King-Stella Maris and, using the hurricane insurance settlement as seed money, a $3 million campaign was begun.

Bishop David Thompson presided over the groundbreaking in 1994, and in 1995 the 33,000 square foot addition was completed. In 1996 the original building was renovated to the same modern standard, and the overall result was a two-story structure housing three classrooms each for pre-kindergarten through 8th grade with networked computer workstations and internet access. The school also now had an automated media center, modern music studio, guidance center, and an assistant principal's office to go with the refurbished art center, kitchen, faculty lounges, workrooms, and enlarged staff offices and conference facilities.

In 1999, with Christ Our King Parish about to embark on a campaign to build a Life Center, the school was presented with the opportunity to join in the $3.5 million campaign. This would be the chance to build a gymnasium and auditorium, gain much-needed space for the growing After School program, and add the five classrooms and science lab on the Camellia Drive side of the school as originally planned.

In 2009 the school was named a National Blue Ribbon School of Excellence from the U.S. Department of Education. In 2011, Christ Our King-Stella Maris's middle school became a fully accredited International Baccalaureate World School, which continued until the end of the 2016–2017 school year. In 2012, the school began the highly successful president-principal administration model and also began the largest and most ambitions 1-to-1 iPad Education Technology Initiative in the entire state of South Carolina. COKSM is fully accredited by the Southern Association of Colleges and Schools.

The schools currently serves the children of Stella Maris, Christ Our King, St. Benedict's, and St. Clare of Assisi parishes.

== Academics ==
Christ Our King-Stella Maris School offers a curriculum based on the subject and grade-level standards of the Diocese of Charleston. For middle school students. Students have six core classes (Religion, Math, Science, English, Spanish, and Social Studies) and four once-weekly enrichment classes (Visual Arts, Music / Chorus, Technology & Design, and Physical Education). In addition, middle school students have the option of taking Advanced Choir, Studio Art, or Physical Education, twice a week, where they learn complex skills that they would not get from a once-a-week course. For middle school, many of the student textbooks are provided digitally through the 1-to-1 iPad program.

For eligible middle school students, COKSM offers three courses for high school credit: Algebra I, Geometry, and Spanish I.

Students in all grade levels annually complete the Cognitive Abilities Test and, in addition, students in grades 3 and up also complete the Measure of Academic Progress or MAP testing. Students in 8th grade are also eligible to take the PSAT. As per the requirements of the Blue Ribbon designation, students at COKSM score in the top 10% on national standardized tests.

== Clubs, activities, and athletics ==
Christ Our King-Stella Maris offers a variety of clubs, activities, and athletics throughout the year. They include:

- Student Government
- National Beta Club
- Robotics Teams
  - FIRST Lego League Challenge for middle school students (which have been the best in state for robotics two years in a row)
  - FIRST Lego League Explore for elementary school students
- Edmund Rice Religion Club
- Spanish Club
- Math Club / Mathcounts
- Harmonia Choir (for school masses)
- Honors Choir
- Spring Musical
- Yearbook Committee club
- Irish Dance

COKSM has athletic teams for many sports across most grade levels, including:

- Basketball
- Volleyball
- Tennis
- Football
- Golf
- Archery
- Cheerleading & Dance

Eligible 7th and 8th grade students can also participate in teams for Bishop England High School, include swimming, track, cross country, lacrosse, baseball, softball, hockey, football, rugby, wrestling, and more.

== Traditions & Fundraisers ==
Several events take place throughout the year. These include:

- The Bazaar - An annual fair / fundraiser held on the school ground where students can play games, win prizes, watch performances, and more. The school has held a bazaar every year since 1952.
- ECCO Canned Food Drive - Held each year leading up to Thanksgiving to support local charities and shelters.
- Christmas Tree Sales - The school playground hosts an annual Christmas tree sale in December that serves as both a fundraiser and a community social event.
- Annual student art fair
- Spring Gala - Biannual auction held by the Home & School Association to support the school.
- Move Across America - An annual 4th grade cross-curricular activity encouraging students to log miles to "travel" across the country.
- Lenten Rice Bowls - Students save their loose change throughout Lent to support Catholic Relief Services.
- Passion Play - The eighth grade students and choirs present the Stations of the Cross before the Easter holiday each year.
- Spring Musical - The middle school students produce a different play each spring.
- 5th Grade Barrier Island Trip - Students in the fifth grade spend 3 days at Camp St. Christopher on Johns Island.
- May Crowning - Every May, the students place a crown of flowers on the statue of Mary in the school courtyard.
- 8th Grade Awards - Presentation of academic, athletic, and community awards to graduating 8th graders
- 8th Grade Graduation Mass
- Parent Prayer Group

== Facilities ==
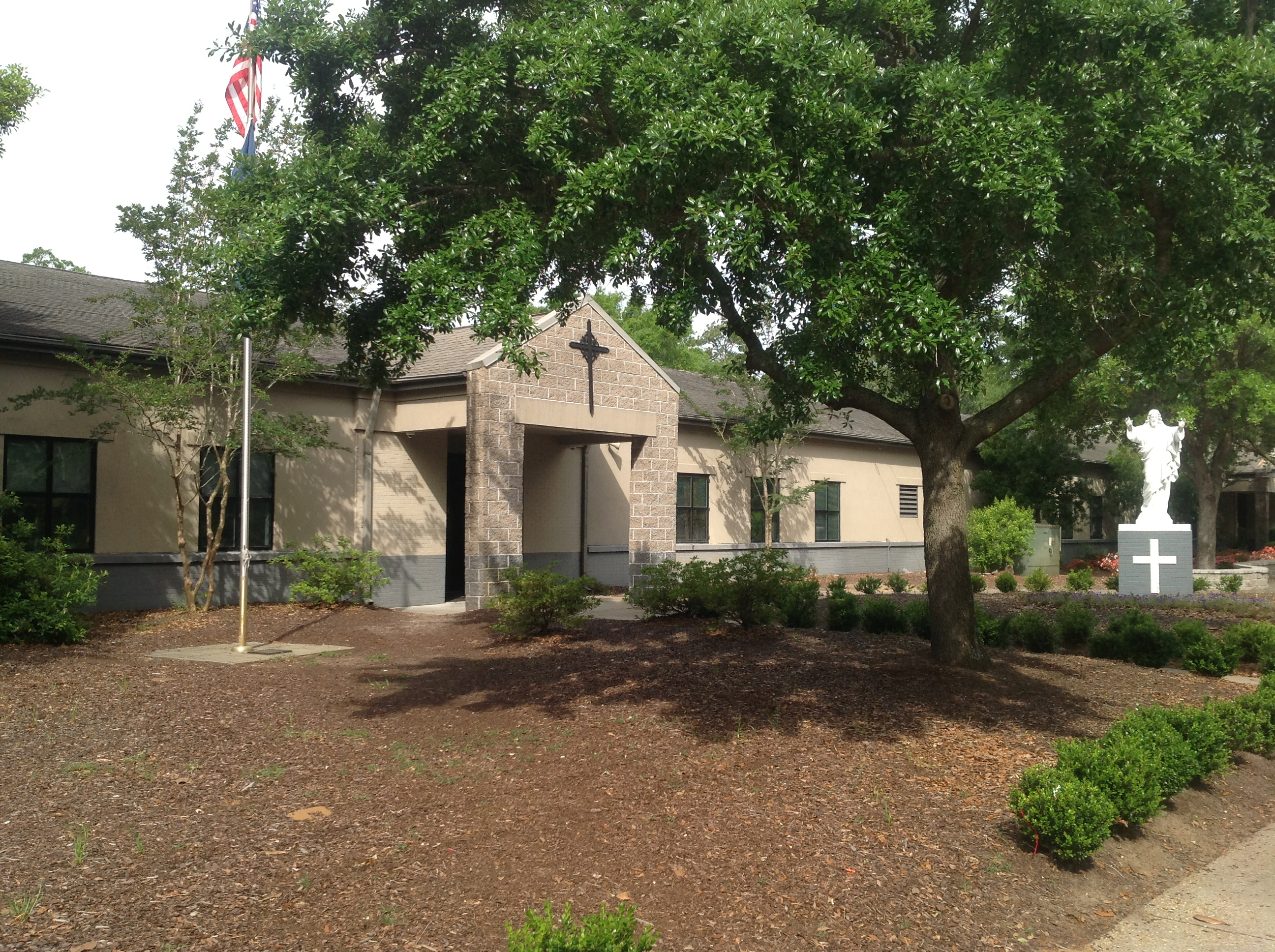
A view of the front of Christ Our King-Stella Maris School from Russell Drive.

- 38 classrooms
- Science lab
- Art studio
- Computer lab (equipped with green screen and a 3D printer)
- Library
- Full-size gymnasium with performing arts stage
- Outdoor amphitheater
- Outdoor basketball court
- Recess field
- Lego Robotics room
