= Mount Pleasant, South Carolina =

Mount Pleasant
- Town
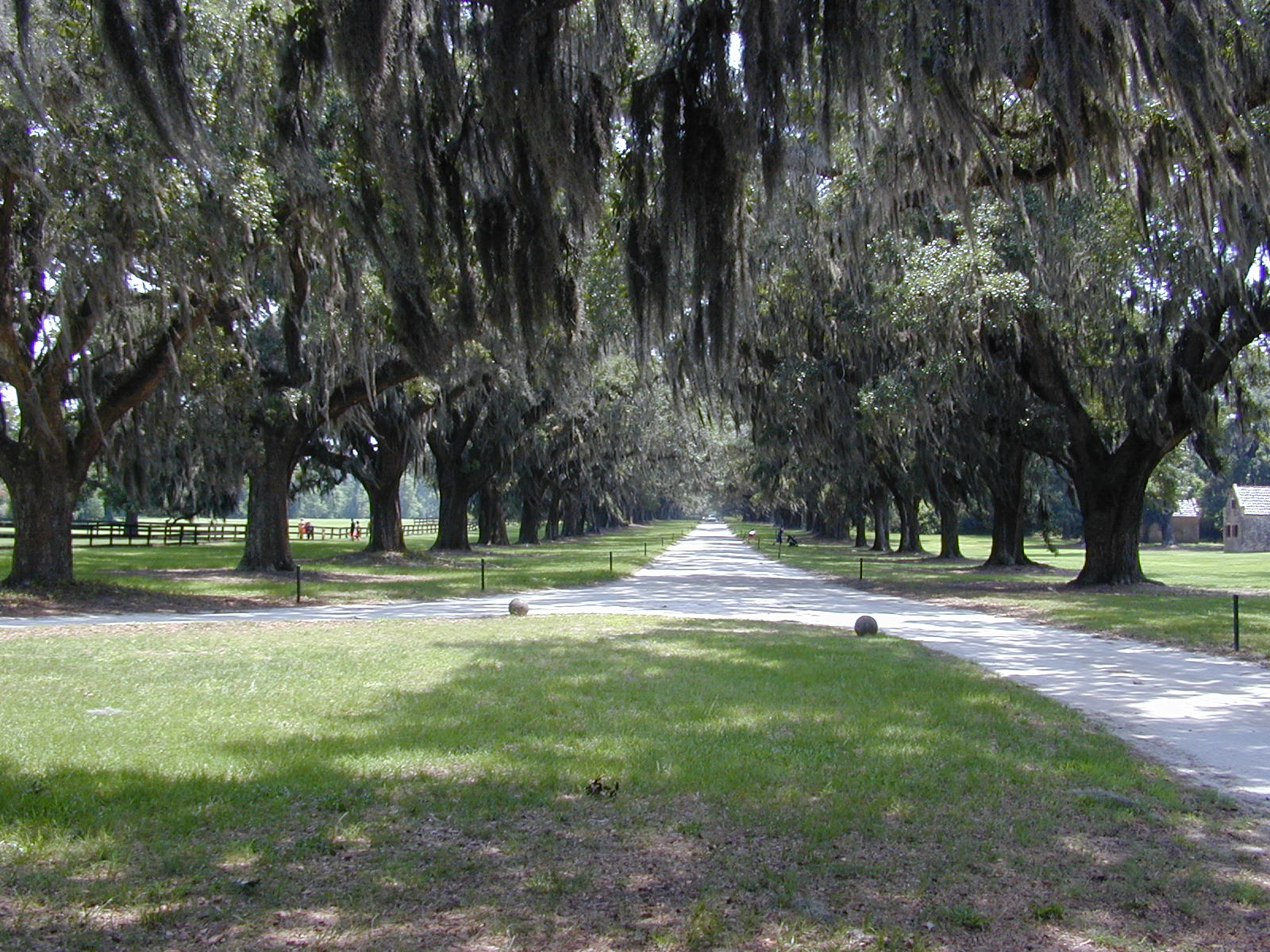
- Boone Hall Plantation

- Seal
- Interactive map of Mount Pleasant
- Location within South Carolina Location within the United States
- Coordinates: 32°48′39″N 79°47′40″W
- Country: United States
- State: South Carolina
- County: Charleston
- Settled: July 6, 1680
- Founded: 1776 (Greenwich); 1803 (Mount Pleasant)
- Consolidated: 1837
- Named for: Hibben House

Area
  - Total: 58.66 sq mi (151.92 km^{2})
  - Land: 49.54 sq mi (128.32 km^{2})
  - Water: 9.11 sq mi (23.60 km^{2}) 15.53%
- Elevation: 13 ft (4.0 m)

Population (2020)
  - Total: 90,801
  - Density: 1,833/sq mi (707.6/km^{2})
- Time zone: UTC−5 (EST)
  - Summer (DST): UTC−4 (EDT)
- ZIP codes: 29464-29466, 29429
- Area code: 843, 854
- FIPS code: 45-48535
- GNIS feature ID: 2406211
- Website: www.tompsc.com

Mount Pleasant is a large suburban town in Charleston County, South Carolina, United States. In the Lowcountry, it is the fourth-most populous municipality in South Carolina, and for several years was one of the state's fastest-growing areas, doubling in population between 1990 and 2000. The population was 90,801 at the 2020 census. It is part of the Charleston metropolitan area.

At the foot of the Arthur Ravenel Bridge is Patriots Point, a naval and maritime museum, home to the World War II aircraft carrier USS Yorktown, which is now a museum ship. The Ravenel Bridge, an eight-lane highway that is part of U.S. Route 17 and was completed in 2005, spans the Cooper River and links Mount Pleasant with the city of Charleston.

== History ==
The site of Mount Pleasant was originally occupied by the Sewee people, an Algonquian language–speaking tribe. The first European settlers arrived from England on July 6, 1680, under the leadership of Captain Florentia O'Sullivan. Captain O'Sullivan had been granted 2,340 acres (950 ha), which included not only the island later named for him, but also the future site of Mount Pleasant. On the earliest map of the time, this area was called "North Point".

In 1696, 51 new settlers arrived. Each family was allotted several hundred acres in the area that became known as Christ Church parish. In 1706, the Province of Carolina withstood several attacks by the Spanish and the French from their settlements to the south and defeated French invaders in an area known as "Abcaw".

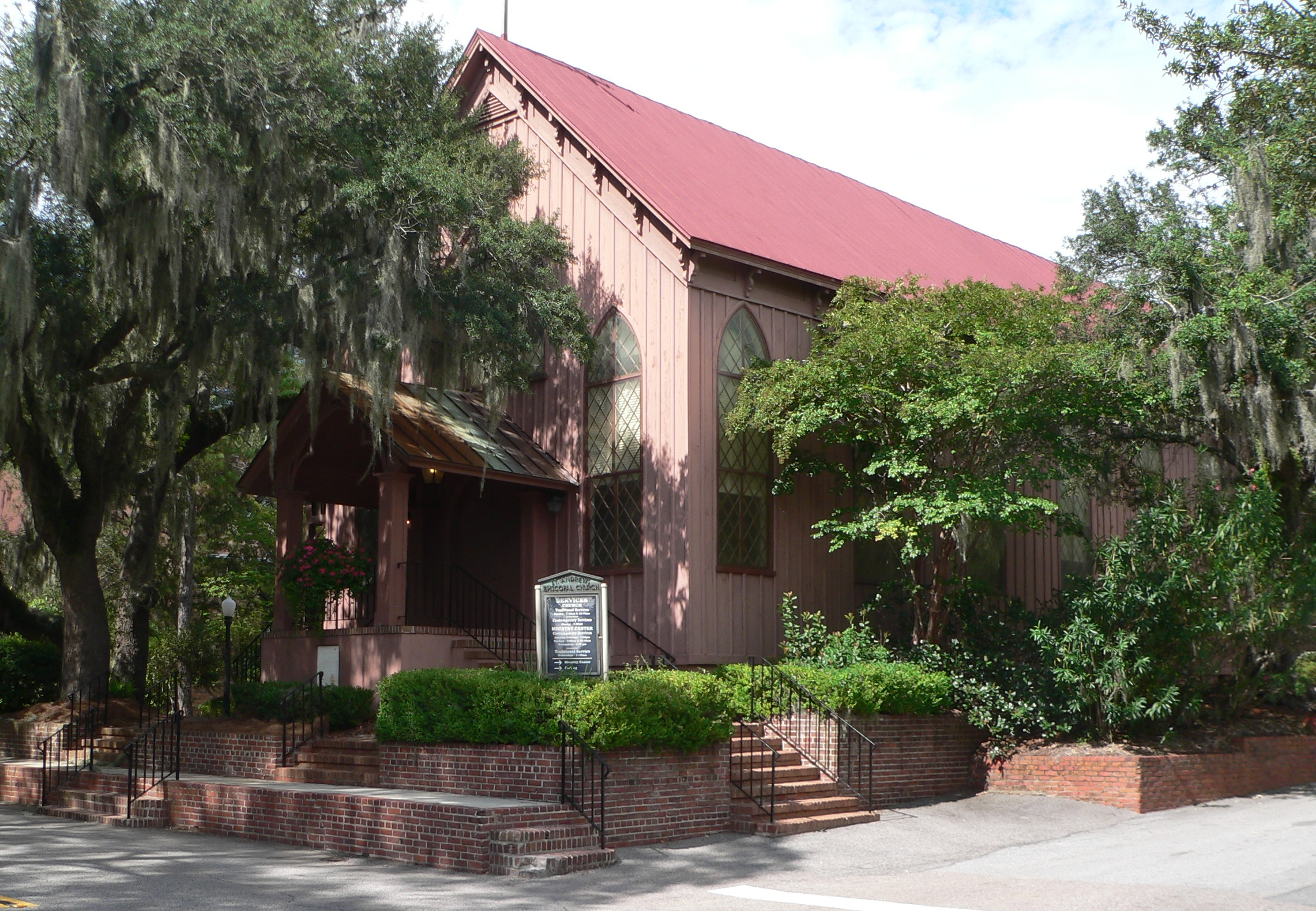
St. Andrew's Church was built in 1857 as a chapel of ease for Christ Church Parish and today is part of the Mount Pleasant Historic District.

The area of "Abcaw" was Hobcaw Plantation, located between Shem Creek and the Wando River. Later, it was also known as Shipyard Plantation. Its access to deep water and abundant good timber made it ideal for developing a prosperous shipbuilding enterprise. Lands adjacent to Hobcaw Point were owned at different times by several English families, many of which maintained ferries that served Mount Pleasant. By 1721, 107 families were living in Christ Church parish, including 400 whites and 637 enslaved Africans or African Americans. As the area was developed for large plantations, enslaved Africans and African Americans made up the chief labor force of the slave society. Based on this history, the majority of the population in the town was African American through the 19th and early 20th centuries.

In 1754, Charles Pinckney acquired a 715-acre plantation, cultivating the commodity crops of rice and indigo. It became known as Snee Farm near here. His son Charles retained the plantation until 1817. It was operated as a plantation through the 19th century.

On September 24, 1860, a public meeting was held in Mount Pleasant; it resulted in the first secession resolution passed in the state. The secession convention met in Charleston on December 20, 1860. With the advent of the Civil War, Battery Guerry and an adjacent floating battery between Mount Pleasant and Sullivan's Island were instrumental in defense of the city. They were also bases for attacks on Fort Sumter. The city was defended by a line of fortifications from Elliot's Creek at Boone Hall to Copahee Sound. Mount Pleasant was the secret training ground for the nine-man crew of the Confederate submarine H. L. Hunley. This small vessel was launched from Breach Inlet in 1864 to attack and sink the USS Housatonic.

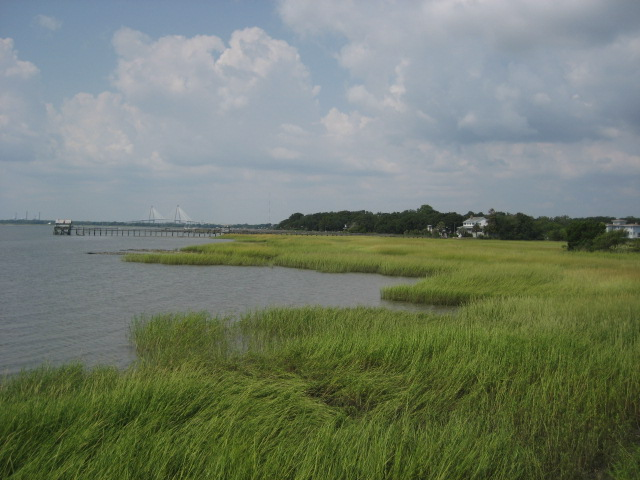
View from the old Pitt Street Bridge in Old Village

The original plank-and-barrel footbridge, later known as the Pitt Street Bridge at the foot of the Old Village area in Mount Pleasant, was used by the crew of the "H.L. Hunley" to cross Breach Inlet to test the submarine. In 1899, the original wooden plank bridge was replaced by a trolley bridge.

A generation later, in 1929, a steel drawbridge was built for vehicle access between Sullivan's Island and Mount Pleasant. The Pitt Street bridge was dismantled in 1945, but the remains are visible in the Intracoastal Waterway. The area has been maintained since then as the Pickett Bridge Recreation Area. It was named for Charleston doctor Otis Pickett.

The "Old Village" is Mount Pleasant's oldest neighborhood; the oldest home, 111 Hibben Street (the Hibben House) was constructed in 1755 by Jacob Motte, a descendant of French Huguenots who had immigrated to South Carolina to escape religious persecution.

In the early 21st century, the Old Village is centered on the Pitt Street Shops at the northwestern end of the street. Among them is the Pitt Street Pharmacy, which was featured on the Food Network. It has operated at this location for more than 60 years.

The numerous slaves were freed during and after the Civil War. In 1875 African Americans made up 73% of the population in Charleston County.

=== Scanlonville ===
Some freedmen developed Scanlonville, one of the first African-American communities to be formed after the Civil War in the Charleston area. Today, it is a neighborhood within Mount Pleasant that has been annexed by the city. Robert Scanlon, a freedman carpenter, purchased the 614-acre (248 ha) property known as Remley's Plantation, bordering Charleston harbor along the Wando River in Mount Pleasant. Scanlon was the president and founder of the Charleston Land Company, formed by 100 local freedmen who pooled their limited resources and paid $10 per share, to purchase large tracts of land in the area. The Charleston Land Company divided this tract into smaller lots so freedmen could have their land. Remley's Plantation was divided into farm lots and city lots (which were smaller) to form the community of Scanlonville. The Charleston Land Company and Scanlonville are one of four known cooperative real estate development ventures among African-American freedmen after the Civil War. Remley Point Cemetery is in Scanlonville.

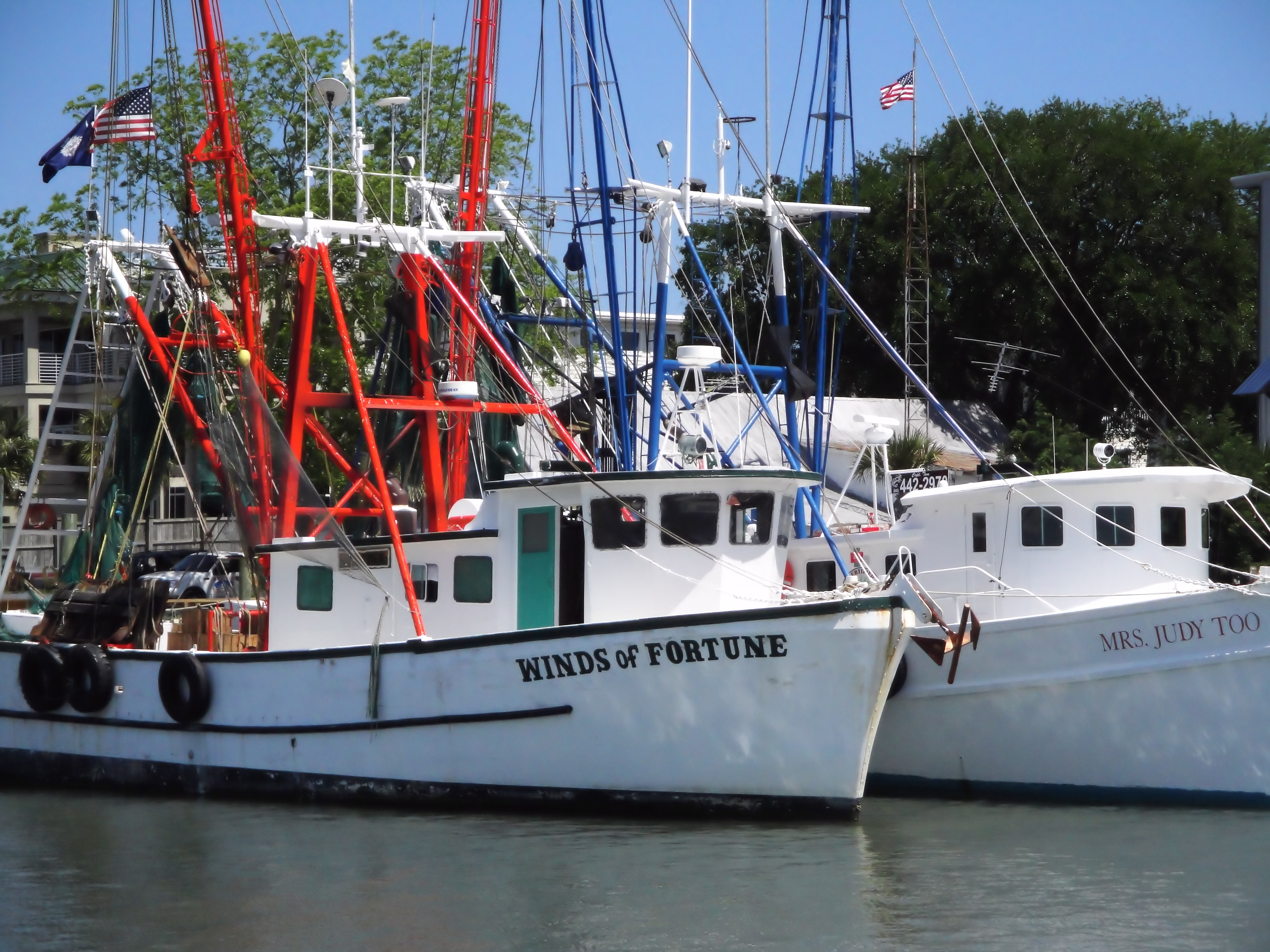
Fishing boats on Shem Creek

=== Riverside ===
West of Scanlonville is Riverside. During the Jim Crow years of much of the 20th century, this was known as the largest and oldest of five "black beaches" in Charleston County. It was established when public facilities were segregated under state law. Riverside officially opened in 1930 and featured a dance pavilion, athletics field, bathhouse, playground, and a boardwalk along the Wando River. Riverside Pavilion was the only venue where black city residents could see African-American musical legends such as Duke Ellington, Count Basie, Louis Armstrong, B.B. King, and Ivory Joe Hunter, who also performed in whites-only venues. Music performances at the Pavilion spawned juke joints, or night clubs, in Scanlonville and eventually a hotel called White's Paradise. James Brown was known to have frequented this hotel.

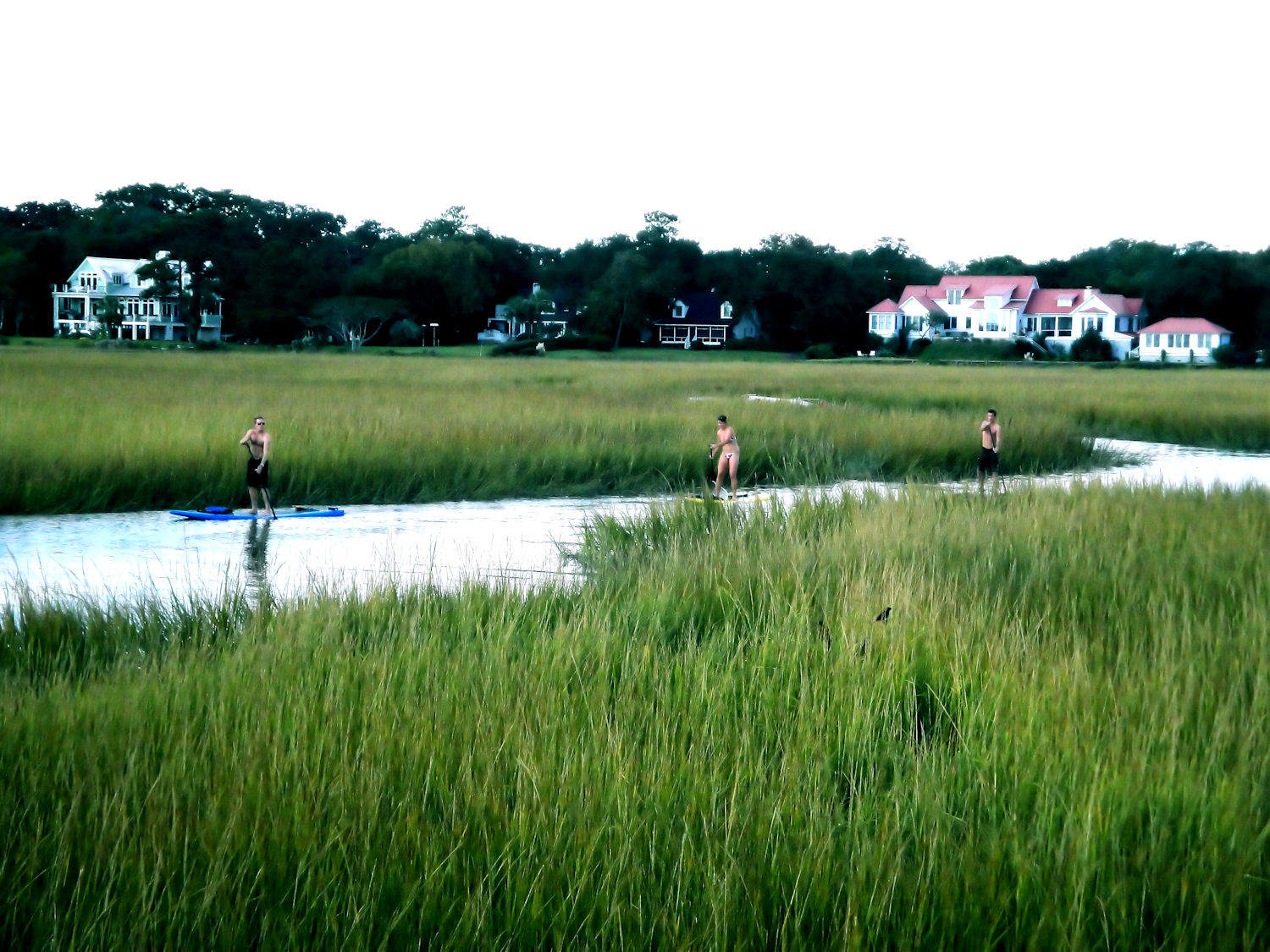
Exploring the marshes

After the original park owner died in 1975, operations of the Riverside property were taken over by Charleston County. It eventually sold the property to a real estate company, which developed this area as a private gated community. Public access to the waterfront ended.

=== Hurricane Hugo and growth that followed ===
On September 21, 1989, Mount Pleasant was hit by Hurricane Hugo, a Category Four hurricane. While the town was spared from the worst of the storm (Category 4 conditions were suffered by areas further north of the city), the town and its neighboring barrier islands still had severe damage. Children who lived through the storm were featured in an early episode of Nickelodeon's Nick News, along with children who lived through Hurricane Andrew.

Development continued. A year after the storm, more people moved to the area, and the town had its most significant growth spurt. It increased from a population of roughly 23,000 in 1990 to one of roughly 47,000 in 2000.

=== County seat ===
The county seat for Berkeley County was located in Mount Pleasant from 1882 until 1895, when it was moved to Moncks Corner.

=== Bridges ===
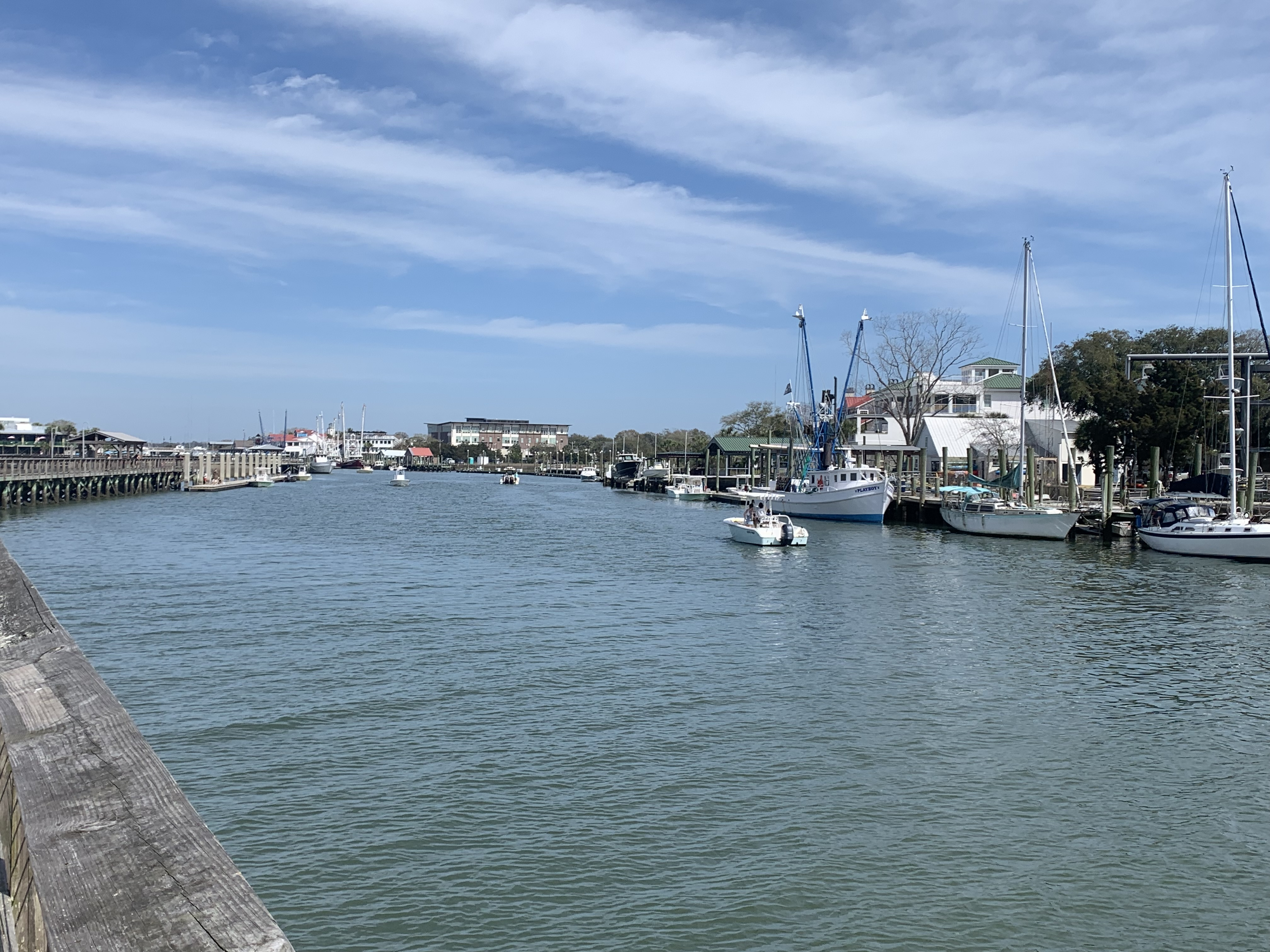
Shem Creek, as seen in 2026

In 1928, a bridge from the Charleston Peninsula to Mount Pleasant was built. Spanning Town Creek and the Cooper River, and crossing the uninhabited Drum Island, the two-lane Grace Memorial Bridge was opened as a toll bridge. A second and larger bridge, the Silas N. Pearman Bridge, opened in 1966.

On July 16, 2005, the eight-lane Arthur Ravenel Bridge opened for automotive traffic, replacing the two aging bridges. It is one of the longest cable-stayed bridges in the Western Hemisphere. A week before the new bridge officially opened, pedestrians were allowed to cross the bridge, and commemorative coins were distributed. Also, a fireworks display was part of the ceremonies before the official opening. Several cars from the same time as the Grace Memorial Bridge, including several restored Model A Fords, made a final crossing of the old bridges. The remaining portions of the old bridges were demolished. Residents watched as the bridges were demolished by explosives over several weeks, through the summer of 2006.

In 2004, Mount Pleasant became one of the first municipalities in the United States to pass a "pay-before-you-pump" gas ordinance. It was intended to reduce stealing of gas that had accompanied rising prices.

== Geography ==
Mount Pleasant is located in central Charleston County on the east side of Charleston Harbor and the tidal Wando River. It is bordered to the south by the city of Sullivan's Island and to the west and northwest, across the harbor and river, by the city of Charleston. Over time, the town limits have pushed northeastward from the Old Village area 24 miles (39 km) along U.S. Route 17, nearly as far as Awendaw.

Mount Pleasant is separated from Charleston by the Cooper River. For many years, the town was populated largely on a seasonal basis by Charleston residents wealthy enough to afford summer homes across the river from the Charleston peninsula, where they would go believing they could escape the regular summer "fevers". The population of Mount Pleasant was centered in "Old Village".

According to the United States Census Bureau, the town has a total area of 58.66 square miles (151.9 km^{2}), of which 49.55 square miles (128.3 km^{2}) is land and 9.11 square miles (23.6 km^{2}) (15.53%) is water.

== Demographics ==
Historical population
Census	Pop.	Note	%±
1880	783		—
1890	1,138		45.3%
1900	2,252		97.9%
1910	1,346		−40.2%
1920	1,575		17.0%
1930	1,415		−10.2%
1940	1,698		20.0%
1950	1,857		9.4%
1960	5,116		175.5%
1970	6,155		20.3%
1980	14,464		135.0%
1990	30,108		108.2%
2000	47,609		58.1%
2010	67,843		42.5%
2020	90,801		33.8%
2025 (est.)	95,469	▲	5.1%
U.S. Decennial Census; 2020

=== Racial and ethnic composition ===
Mount Pleasant, South Carolina – Racial and ethnic composition Note: the U.S. census treats Hispanic/Latino as an ethnic category. This table excludes Latinos from the racial categories and assigns them to a separate category. Hispanics/Latinos may be of any race.
Race / Ethnicity (NH = Non-Hispanic)	Pop 2000	Pop 2010	Pop 2020	% 2000	% 2010	% 2020
White alone (NH)	42,515	60,653	79,476	89.30%	89.40%	87.53%
Black or African American alone (NH)	3,445	3,403	2,984	7.24%	5.02%	3.29%
Native American or Alaska Native alone (NH)	67	131	117	0.14%	0.19%	0.13%
Asian alone (NH)	552	1,103	2,012	1.16%	1.63%	2.22%
Pacific Islander alone (NH)	9	20	27	0.02%	0.03%	0.03%
Some Other Race alone (NH)	38	55	249	0.08%	0.08%	0.27%
Mixed Race or Multi-Racial (NH)	348	628	2,701	0.73%	0.93%	2.97%
Hispanic or Latino (any race)	635	1,850	3,235	1.33%	2.73%	3.56%
Total	47,609	67,843	90,801	100.00%	100.00%	100.00%

=== 2020 census ===
As of the 2020 census, Mount Pleasant had a population of 90,801. The median age was 41.6 years. 22.4% of residents were under the age of 18 and 18.0% of residents were 65 years of age or older. For every 100 females there were 91.8 males, and for every 100 females age 18 and over there were 88.5 males age 18 and over. There were 24,203 families residing in the town.

99.5% of residents lived in urban areas, while 0.5% lived in rural areas.

There were 37,188 households in Mount Pleasant, of which 30.2% had children under the age of 18 living in them. Of all households, 55.5% were married-couple households, 14.5% were households with a male householder and no spouse or partner present, and 25.2% were households with a female householder and no spouse or partner present. About 26.9% of all households were made up of individuals and 9.7% had someone living alone who was 65 years of age or older.

There were 40,680 housing units, of which 8.6% were vacant. The homeowner vacancy rate was 1.5% and the rental vacancy rate was 11.5%.

=== 2010 census ===
At the 2010 census, there were 67,843 people, 19,025 households, and 12,860 families residing in the city. The population density was 1,136.5 inhabitants per square mile (438.8/km^{2}). There were 20,197 housing units at an average density of 482.1 per square mile (186.1/km^{2}). The racial makeup of the city was 90.17% White, 7.25% African American, 0.17% Native American, 1.18% Asian, 0.02% Pacific Islander, 0.39% from other races, and 0.82% from two or more races. Hispanic or Latino of any race were 1.33% of the population.

There were 19,025 households, out of which 33.9% had children under the age of 18 living with them, 56.9% were married couples living together, 8.3% had a female householder with no husband present, and 32.4% were non-families. 24.1% of all households were made up of individuals, and 6.0% had someone living alone who was 65 years of age or older. The average household size was 2.47 and the average family size was 2.99.

In the town, the age distribution of the population shows 25.1% under the age of 18, 6.5% from 18 to 24, 35.3% from 25 to 44, 22.8% from 45 to 64, and 10.3% who were 65 years of age or older. The median age was 36 years. For every 100 females, there were 92.0 males. For every 100 adult females, there were 88.3 adult males.

The median income for a household in the town was $61,054, and the median income for a family was $71,165. Males had a median income of $50,673 versus $31,640 for females. The per capita income for the city was $30,823. About 3.2% of families and 5.0% of the population were below the poverty line, including 5.3% of those under age 18 and 6.6% of those age 65 or over.

== Arts and culture ==
=== Shopping ===
Mount Pleasant is growing in commercial retail stores, boutiques, including:

- Mount Pleasant Towne Centre
- Belle Hall Shopping Center
- The Market at Oakland

=== Historic sites ===
The Auld Mound, Buzzard's Island Site, Christ Church, Cook's Old Field Cemetery, Long Point Plantation (38CH321), Lucas Family Cemetery, Mount Pleasant Historic District, Oakland Plantation House, Old Berkeley County Courthouse, Paul Pritchard Shipyard, Remley Point Cemetery, Slave Street, Smokehouse, and Allee, Boone Hall Plantation, Charles Pinckney National Historic Site, USS Laffey (DD-724), and USS Yorktown (CV-10) are listed on the National Register of Historic Places.

== Parks and recreation ==
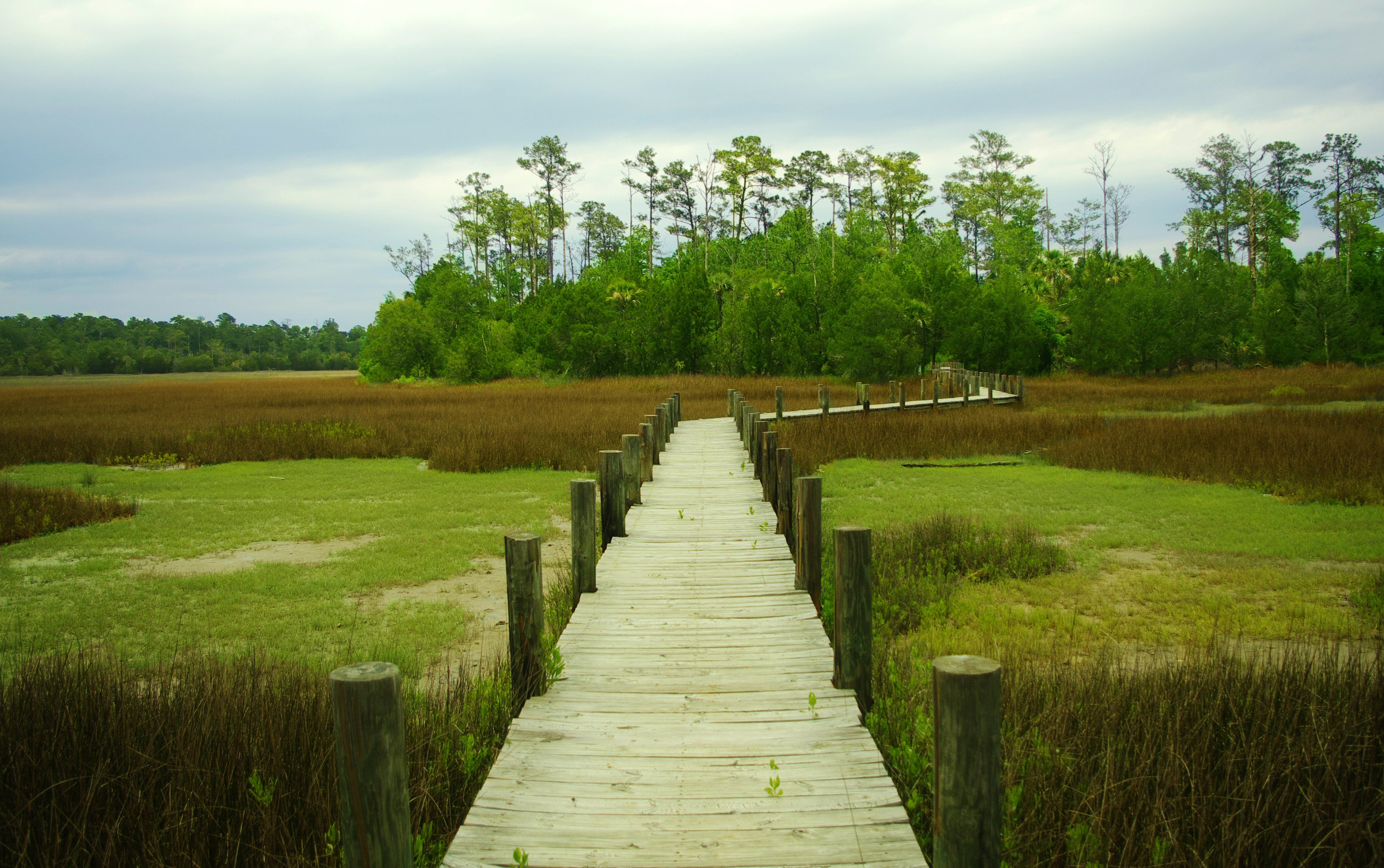
Boardwalk at Palmetto Islands County Park

The Charleston County Park and Recreation Commission (CCPRC) operates numerous facilities within Charleston County. The following are in Mount Pleasant.

- Mount Pleasant Pier
- Palmetto Islands County Park
- Splash Island at Palmetto Islands County Park
- Laurel Hill County Park
- Future Park—off Rifle Range Road

== Government ==
The Town of Mt. Pleasant is run by an elected mayor–council government. As of August 2021, the town council is composed of the mayor (Will Haynie) and eight at-large council members (Howard R. Chapman, P.E., Brenda Corley, Laura Hyatt, Kathy Landing, Tom O'Rouke, Jake Rambo, Gary Santos, and Guang Ming Whitley). The appointed town administrator is Eric DeMoura.

== Education ==
Mount Pleasant's public schools are part of the Charleston County School District.

=== Elementary schools ===
- Belle Hall Elementary School
- Carolina Park Elementary School
- Charles Pinckney Elementary School
- East Cooper Montessori Charter School
- James B. Edwards Elementary School
- Jennie Moore Elementary School
- Laurel Hill Primary School
- Mount Pleasant Academy
- Whitesides Elementary School

=== Middle schools ===
- East Cooper Montessori Charter School
- Laing Middle School
- Moultrie Middle School
- Thomas Cario Middle School

Both Laing Middle School and Moultrie Middle School served as the town's high schools before Wando High School was built in 1973.

=== High schools ===
- Wando High School
- Oceanside Collegiate Academy
- Lucy Beckham High School, Named for deceased Wando High School principal Lucy Garrett Beckham.

=== Private schools ===
- Christ Our King-Stella Maris Catholic School (Catholic Diocese of Charleston)
  - Grades K–8
- Coastal Christian Preparatory School (formerly First Baptist Church School of Mt. Pleasant)
  - Grades K–8
- Crown Leadership Academy
  - Preschool–12th grade
- Palmetto Christian Academy (operated by East Cooper Baptist Church)
  - Preschool–12th grade
- Trident Academy
- University School of the Lowcountry
- Primrose School of Mount Pleasant (infant thru private Pre-K and afterschool)

== Media ==
These TV stations have studios in and broadcast from Mount Pleasant:

- WCBD-TV (2, NBC, CW): owned by Nexstar Media Group
- WCIV-TV (4, ABC, MyNetworkTV): owned by Sinclair Broadcast Group

== Infrastructure ==
=== Airport ===
The town of Mount Pleasant is served by the Charleston International Airport. It is located in the City of North Charleston and is about 12 miles (19 km) northwest of Mount Pleasant. It is the busiest passenger airport in South Carolina (IATA: CHS, ICAO: KCHS). The airport shares runways with the adjacent Charleston Air Force Base. Mount Pleasant Regional Airport also known as "Faison Field" and LRO, is a public airport located within the town limits 9 miles (14 km) northeast of the central business district of Mount Pleasant. Both airports are owned and operated by the Charleston County Aviation Authority.

=== Public safety ===
The Mount Pleasant Fire Department has provided fire suppression and emergency services since 1837, initially as a volunteer agency, and today as a full-time fire department. Today, the fire department has 118 paid personnel augmented by 15 volunteers. It is internationally accredited by the Commission on Fire Accreditation International (CFAI). The Mt. Pleasant Fire Department was originally accredited in 2001 becoming the first accredited fire department in the state of South Carolina. Firefighters work twenty-four-hour rotating shifts. The corporate area and its surroundings are served by seven fire stations. The fire department administrative office is located within the City Municipal Complex. Mount Pleasant fire stations are staffed daily by 33 personnel. In 2007, under the supervision of Chief Herb Williams and Captain Robert Wronski, the Mount Pleasant Fire Department established a "Paramedic Engine" program, in which firefighters trained as Paramedics will carry the same equipment on the fire engines as in the ambulances. Currently, all engines in Mt Pleasant are now operating as "Paramedic Engines". This means in the event Charleston County EMS is delayed, the Mount Pleasant Fire Department will be able to provide life-saving procedures until the ambulance arrives.

The Mount Pleasant Police Department, a 2006 CALEA Flagship Award recipient, employs 132 sworn officers and 43 civilian personnel, serving the entire municipal population. The police department, which is a nationally accredited agency, sanctioned by the Commission on Accreditation for Law Enforcement Agencies, has adopted the problem-oriented policing philosophy of service delivery, which requires officers to work together with citizens to identify community problems, determine the underlying cause, and develop solutions which address these causes in order to resolve the problem. Led by Chief Carl Ritchie, the police response time to the majority of the calls for service beats the national average. Encompassing 52 square miles (135 km^{2}), the department has split the town into eight patrol neighborhoods. Each patrol neighborhood is assigned to a specific officer on each shift.

== Notable people ==
- Ben Bridwell, lead singer of Band of Horses
- Monroe Freeling, NFL player for the Carolina Panthers
- Ruby Middleton Forsythe (1905–1992), educator
- Travis Jervey, former NFL player with 3 teams; Super Bowl champion 1996, Pro Bowl 1997
- James E. Livingston, Maj. General U.S.M.C.; Medal of Honor recipient
- Jack V. Mackmull, U.S. Army lieutenant general
- Ronald Motley, trial lawyer
- Barry Richardson, football player, selected by Kansas City Chiefs in 2008 NFL draft; played for Clemson
- Bear Rinehart, lead singer of Needtobreathe
- Shelby Rogers, tennis player
- Darius Rucker, country singer/songwriter
- Melanie Thornton, American/German R&B, pop, dance singer of La Bouche
- D. J. Trahan, PGA Tour golfer
- Abraham J. Turner, major general of United States Army
- Steve Wood, Anglican bishop

== See also ==
- List of municipalities in South Carolina
- I'On, Mount Pleasant, South Carolina
