= Christ Church (Mount Pleasant, South Carolina) =

Historic church in South Carolina, United States

- Christ Episcopal Church
- U.S. National Register of Historic Places
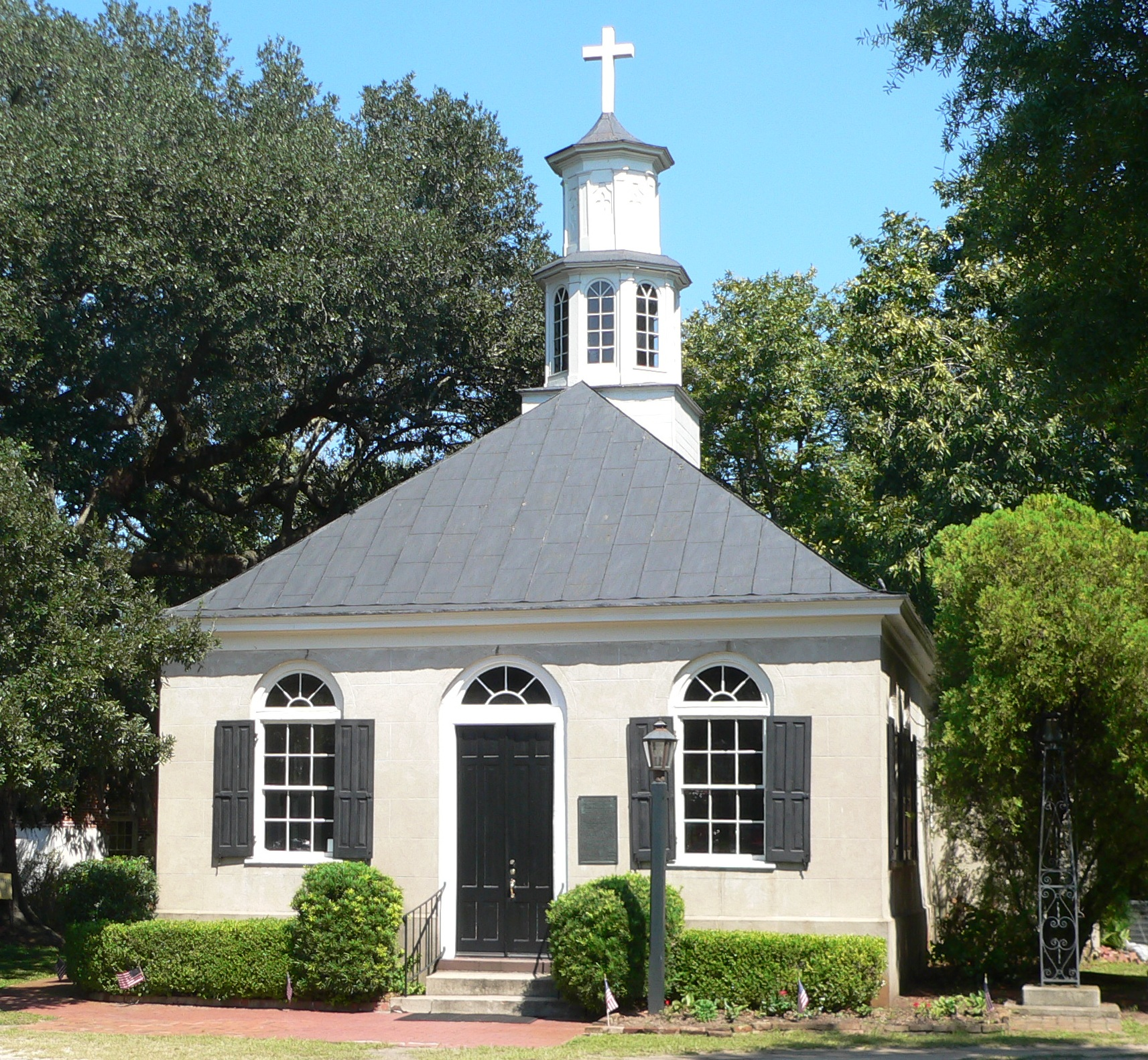

- Location within South Carolina Location within the United States
- Nearest city: Mount Pleasant, South Carolina
- Coordinates: 32°50′38″N 79°48′50″W
- Area: 5 acres (2.0 ha)
- Built: 1726
- Architectural style: Colonial
- NRHP reference No.: 72001201
- Added to NRHP: November 27, 1972

Christ Episcopal Church is a church located in Mount Pleasant, South Carolina.

== History ==
Christ Church parish was one of ten established in South Carolina under the Church Act of 1706, an act of the British Parliament. As such the parish also served as a civil administrative district. A small wooden building was built on this site in 1708, but was accidentally destroyed by a fire in 1725. The current rectangular brick Colonial building with its hipped roof dates back to 1726. A cupola added in the 1786 restoration following damage from the fire set by the retreating British forces. The cemetery contains graves dating back to the mid-1700s.

The cupola was replaced in 1835 and at that time the entrance was moved when the north door was converted to a window. The building was a voting place until 1865. Towards the close of the American Civil War, Union cavalry from the 21st United States Colored Infantry Regiment used the church as a stable and the interior was gutted.

The building was rebuilt by 1874, and in 1961, wings containing a sacristy and a rector's office were added.

It was added to the National Register of Historic Places in 1972. The active congregation in 2012 left the Episcopal Church and in 2017 joined the Anglican Church in North America. In 2022, the South Carolina Supreme Court ruled that according to the Dennis Canon of the Episcopal Church, the parish property was held in trust for the Diocese of South Carolina, and the ACNA church was required to vacate the property at the end of August 2022. The historic Episcopal congregation returned to its historic church at the beginning of September 2022.

== See also ==
- Episcopal Diocese of South Carolina
