= Oakland Plantation (Beech Island, South Carolina) =

Historic house in South Carolina, United States

- U.S. National Register of Historic Places
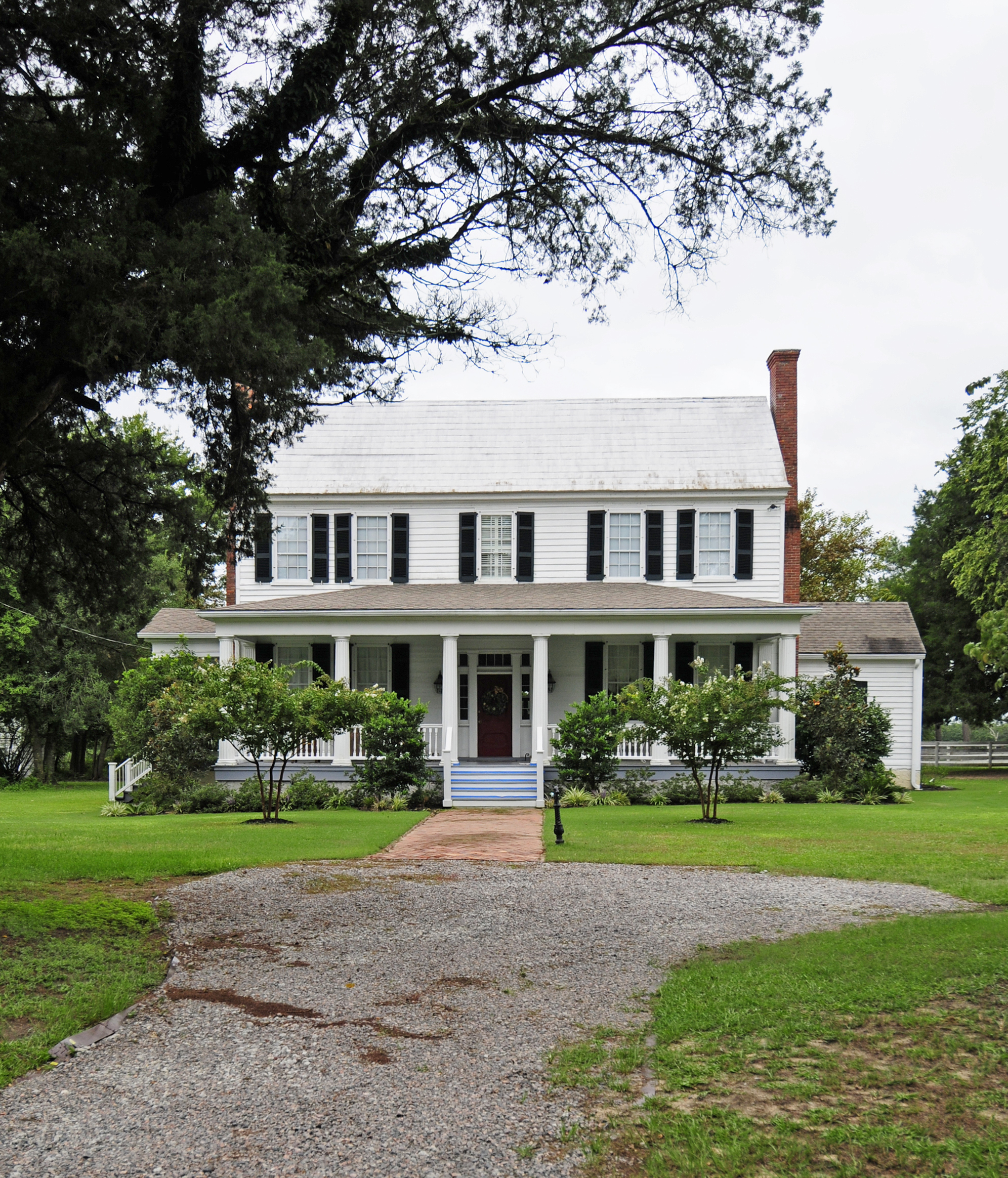
- Oakland Plantation, August 2012

- Location within South Carolina Location within the United States
- Location: 2930 Storm Branch Rd., Beech Island, South Carolina
- Coordinates: 33.44987°N 81.83774°W
- Area: 5.06 acres (2.05 ha)
- Built: c.1824–1826; 200 years ago
- Architectural style: I-House
- NRHP reference No.: 10001219
- Added to NRHP: August 19, 2011

Oakland Plantation, also known as the Wade Glover House, is a historic plantation home located near Beech Island, Aiken County, South Carolina. It was built in 1824–1826, and is a Carolina I-house with minimal mid-19th century and early-20th century additions and alterations. It has a central hall two-over-two floor plan with gable-end chimneys, one-story gallery on the facade, and shed room on the rear elevation. Also on the property are two contributing outbuildings: a frame one-story gable-end dairy house (c. 1850) and a frame one-story gable-end garage (c. 1920).

It was listed in the National Register of Historic Places in 2011.
