= Aiken Colored Cemetery =

United States historic place in Aiken, South Carolina

- U.S. National Register of Historic Places
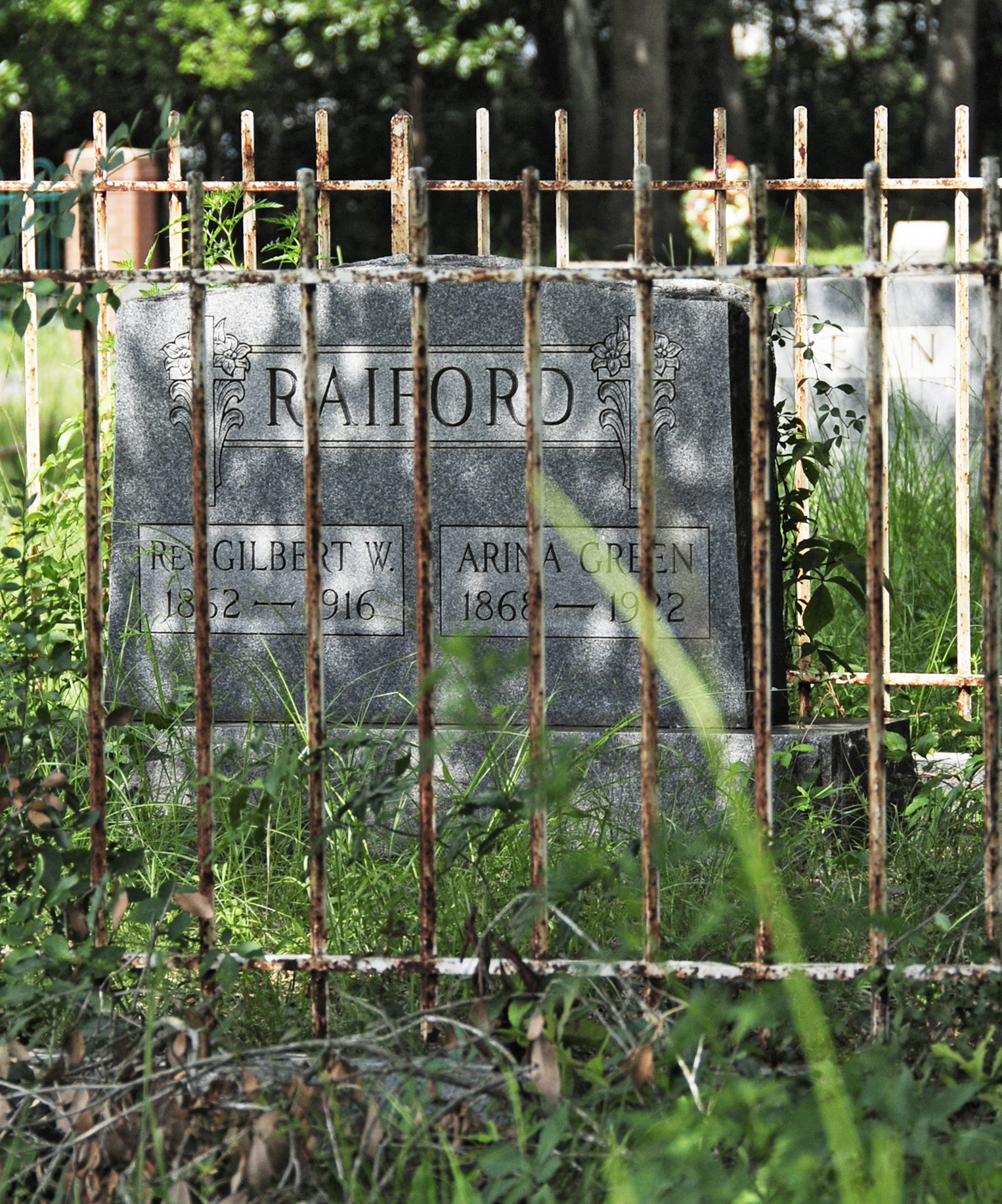

- Location within South Carolina
- Location: Florence St. and Hampton Ave., Aiken, South Carolina
- Coordinates: 33.5704°N 81.7242°W
- Area: 9.5 acres (3.8 ha)
- Built: 1852; 174 years ago
- NRHP reference No.: 07000182
- Added to NRHP: March 19, 2007

Aiken Colored Cemetery, a historic cemetery in Aiken, South Carolina, US, covers nearly 10 acres and is located several miles from the downtown area. It was the only burial grounds for Aiken's African-American community through the mid 20th century.

The cemetery began operating in 1852, well before the Civil War era. Its occupants represent a diverse range including slaves, freedmen, business leaders, tradesmen, and paupers. The cemetery is now called Pine Lawn Memorial Gardens and is accessible to the public.

Aiken Colored Cemetery was listed in the National Historic Register on March 19, 2007.

== See also ==
- List of cemeteries in South Carolina
