= The Cedars (Beech Island, South Carolina) =

Historic house in South Carolina, United States

- U.S. National Register of Historic Places
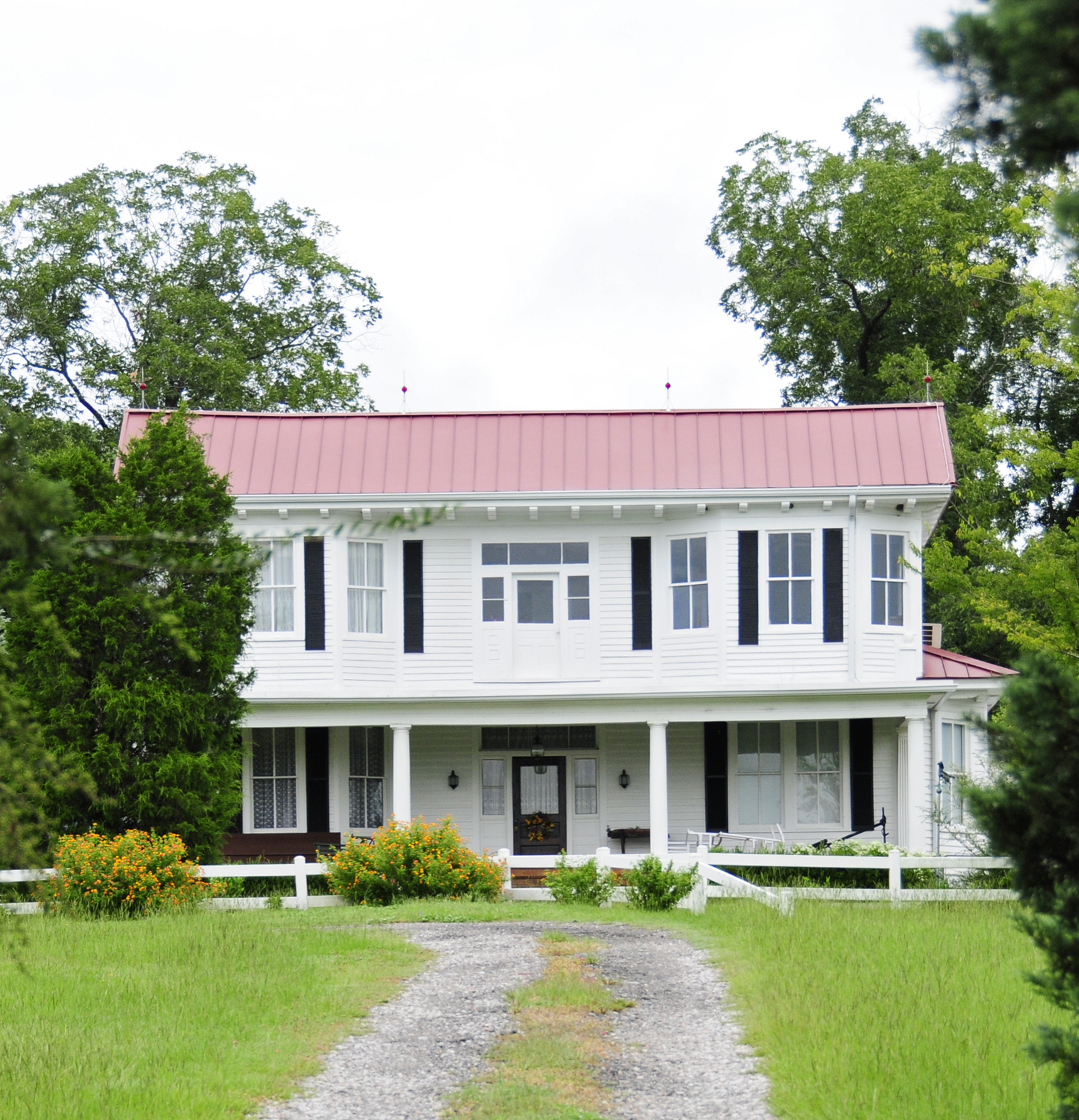

- Location within South Carolina Location within the United States
- Nearest city: Beech Island, South Carolina
- Coordinates: 33°25′38″N 81°52′50″W
- Area: 12.1 acres (4.9 ha)
- Built: 1908; 118 years ago
- NRHP reference No.: 93000539
- Added to NRHP: June 17, 1993

The Cedars, also known as Ardis House or Atkinson House, is a house in Beech Island, South Carolina. It was listed on the U.S. National Register of Historic Places in 1993.
