= Charleston Cemeteries Historic District =

Historic area in South Carolina, US

- U.S. National Register of Historic Places
- U.S. Historic district
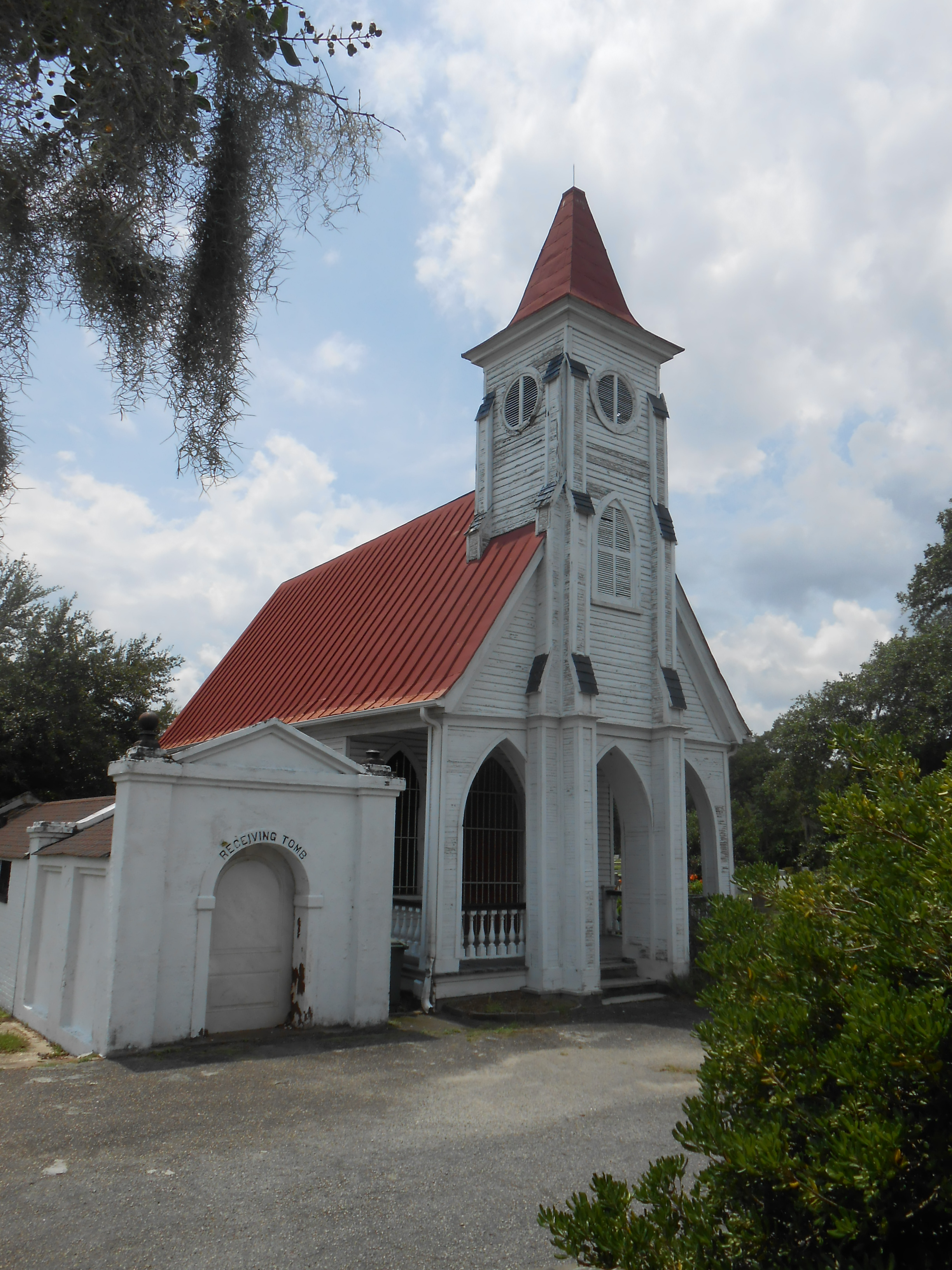
- Bethany Cemetery chapel

- Location within South Carolina Location within the United States
- Location: Huguenin Ave., roughly bounded by Algonquin Rd., CSXRR, N. Romney & Meeting Sts., Charleston, South Carolina
- Coordinates: 32°49′N 79°57′W
- Built: 1849
- NRHP reference No.: 100001367
- Added to NRHP: July 24, 2017

The Charleston Cemeteries Historic District encompasses a cluster of 23 cemeteries north of downtown Charleston, South Carolina. Laid out on either side of Huguenin Street in the northern part of peninsular Charleston, they were laid out between 1849 and 1956, and represented a concentrated diversity in funerary art and cemetery landscape design practices. The oldest cemetery is Magnolia Cemetery, laid out in 1849 in the then-fashionable rural cemetery style.

The district was listed on the National Register of Historic Places in 2017.

== See also ==
- National Register of Historic Places listings in Charleston, South Carolina
- List of cemeteries in South Carolina
- Champion and Pearson Funeral Home
- St. Michael's Churchyard, Charleston
- Coming Street Cemetery
