= Oolenoy Baptist Church Cemetery =

Historic site in Pickens County, South Carolina

- U.S. National Register of Historic Places
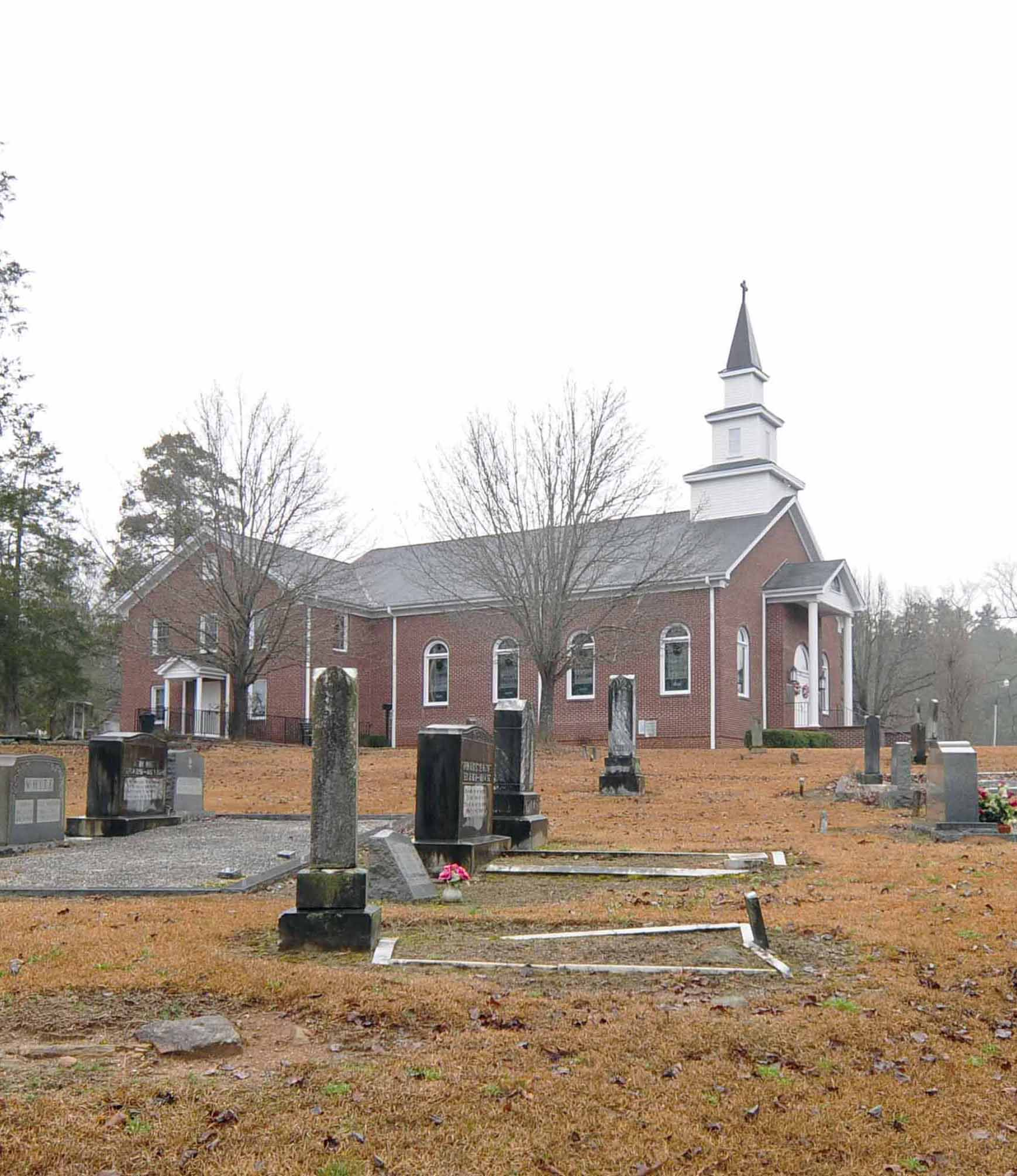
- Oolenoy Baptist Church Cemetery

- Location within South Carolina Location within the United States
- Location: 201 Miracle Hill Rd., near Pickens, South Carolina
- Coordinates: 34°59′43″N 82°38′29″W
- Area: 5.5 acres (2.2 ha)
- NRHP reference No.: 03000659
- Added to NRHP: October 14, 2003

Oolenoy Baptist Church Cemetery is a historic Baptist church cemetery located near Pickens, Pickens County, South Carolina. It was established about 1798, and contains 839 marked graves, with headstones, footstones, and a few plot enclosures.

It was added to the National Register of Historic Places in 2003.
