= Beech Island, South Carolina =

Unincorporated community in South Carolina, US

- Census-designated place
- Location within South Carolina
- Coordinates: 33°25′53″N 81°52′47″W
- Country: United States
- State: South Carolina
- County: Aiken

Area
  - Total: 5.02 sq mi (12.99 km^{2})
  - Land: 4.92 sq mi (12.74 km^{2})
  - Water: 0.097 sq mi (0.25 km^{2})
- Elevation: 226 ft (69 m)

Population (2020)
  - Total: 1,421
  - Density: 289/sq mi (111.5/km^{2})
- Time zone: UTC-5 (Eastern (EST))
  - Summer (DST): UTC-4 (EDT)
- ZIP code: 29842
- Area codes: 803, 839
- FIPS code: 45-04915
- GNIS feature ID: 2812928

Beech Island is an unincorporated community and census-designated place (CDP) in Aiken County, South Carolina, United States. It was first listed as a CDP in the 2020 census with a population of 1,421.

== History ==
According to tradition, the community was first named "Beech Highland" on account of its lofty elevation, and over time the H was dropped, causing the present name to be adopted.

Beech Island was primarily an agricultural community before the 1950s. Cotton, wheat, corn, and soybean were the major crops. This changed with the construction of Urquhart Station Power Station and the nearby Savannah River Nuclear Project. New highways were built to accommodate the workers commuting to the Nuclear Project. Commerce grew and the community began to change. In the 1960s Kimberly-Clark built a large manufacturing facility on what was once farmland, creating more jobs. The boom, however, was short-lived.

Beech Island's most famous resident was James Brown, who lived there for the last few decades of his life on a 60-acre (24 ha) estate. Brown is buried in a crypt on a family member's property in Beech Island.

The Cedars, Fort Moore-Savano Town Site, Redcliffe Plantation State Historic Site, Oakland Plantation, and Zubly Cemetery are listed on the National Register of Historic Places.

Beech Island is also home to most of the television transmitters that serve the media market of Augusta, Georgia.

== Demographics ==
Historical population
Census	Pop.	Note	%±
2020	1,421		—
U.S. Decennial Census; 2020

Beech Island first appeared as a census designated place in the 2020 U.S. census.

=== 2020 census ===
Beech Island CDP, South Carolina – Demographic Profile (NH = Non-Hispanic)
Race / Ethnicity	Pop 2020	% 2020
White alone (NH)	694	48.84%
Black or African American alone (NH)	548	38.56%
Native American or Alaska Native alone (NH)	7	0.49%
Asian alone (NH)	7	0.49%
Pacific Islander alone (NH)	3	0.21%
Some Other Race alone (NH)	5	0.35%
Mixed Race/Multi-Racial (NH)	81	5.70%
Hispanic or Latino (any race)	76	5.35%
Total	1,421	100.00%

Note: the US Census treats Hispanic/Latino as an ethnic category. This table excludes Latinos from the racial categories and assigns them to a separate category. Hispanics/Latinos can be of any race.

== Education ==
It is in the Aiken County Public School District.

Beech Island is zoned to Redcliffe Elementary School, Jackson Middle School, and Silver Bluff High School. Silver Bluff High opened in 1981 as a consolidated high school for Beech Island, Jackson, and New Ellenton.

== See also ==
- Beech Island Historical Society
