= Zubly Cemetery =

- U.S. National Register of Historic Places
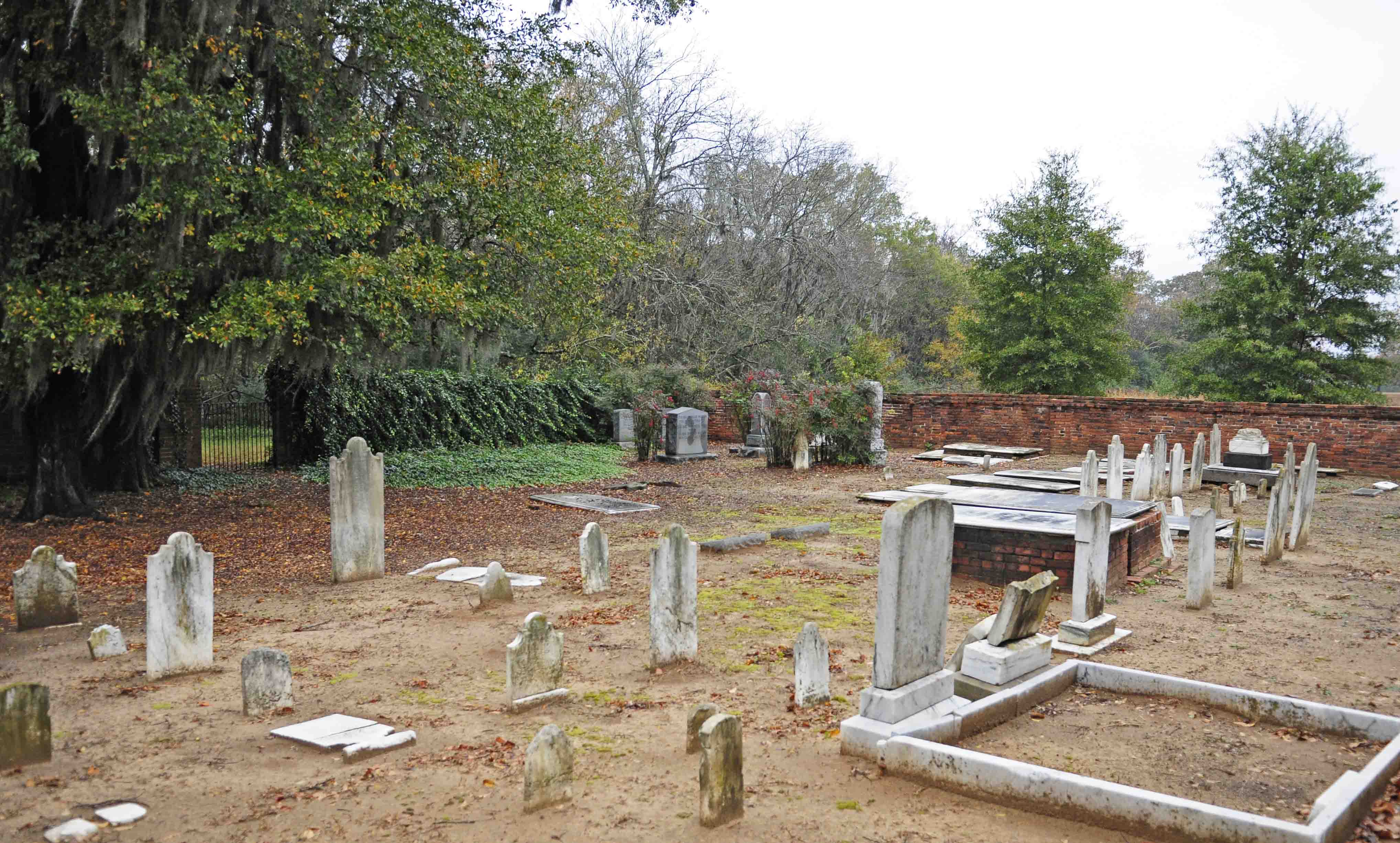

- Location within South Carolina Location within the United States
- Location: Forrest Dr., Beech Island, South Carolina
- Coordinates: 33°24′21″N 81°54′21″W
- Area: less than one acre
- Built: 1790; 236 years ago
- NRHP reference No.: 01001548
- Added to NRHP: January 28, 2002

The Zubly Cemetery near Beech Island, South Carolina, which is a small community in Aiken County, South Carolina was established around 1790 by Swiss settlers of the nearby New Windsor Township. It illustrates the vernacular burial customs of the period. The town of New Windsor, settled in 1737, eventually became an outpost for Indian traders. Zubly Cemetery was listed on the National Register of Historic Places on January 28, 2002.
