= Fort Moore-Savano Town Site =

Archaeological site in South Carolina, United States

- U.S. National Register of Historic Places
- Nearest city: Beech Island, South Carolina
- Area: 8 acres (3.2 ha)
- NRHP reference No.: 73001670
- Added to NRHP: August 14, 1973

Prior to the infamous Trail of Tears, much of the western part of South Carolina was controlled by Native American tribes. The historic area of Fort Moore-Savano Town, is located near Aiken, South Carolina. It was one of the points of intersections between the white settlers and the Native people. Fort Moore, built in earlier part of the 1700s, assisted the white people in restricting the Native Americans to interior lands. The fort was abandoned in 1763. Little is known about the town. The landmark was listed in the National Register of Historic Places on August 14, 1973.
