= Cook's Old Field Cemetery =

Historic site in Charleston County, South Carolina

- U.S. National Register of Historic Places
- Location within South Carolina Location within the United States
- Location: 0.5 miles north of Rifle Range Rd., near Mount Pleasant, South Carolina
- Coordinates: 32°50′20″N 79°48′13″W
- Area: 1 acre (0.40 ha)
- Built: By 1805
- NRHP reference No.: 01000679
- Added to NRHP: May 9, 2003

Cook's Old Field Cemetery, also known as Hamlin Cemetery, is a historic cemetery located near Mount Pleasant, Charleston County, South Carolina. It contains graves dating from 1805 to 1916; the majority date from the 1840s and 1850s. The oldest marker is for Arnold Wells who died in 1805. On July 16, 1863, Mary Moore Hamlin set aside one acre of land for the dedicated cemetery.

The cemetery is an excellent example of a mid-19th century plantation cemetery associated with the Hamlin, Hibben, and Leland families and is an excellent example of mid-nineteenth century gravestone art. It is also the last extant resource associated with the Hamlin, Hibben, and Leland families; none of the families' plantation houses survive around Mount Pleasant. The cemetery has 38 marked graves. There are headstones, box tombs, and an obelisk. Two markers commemorating the descendants of those who began a reunion committee in 1949 are located immediately inside the gate. The stones, arranged by family, display weathering and some vandalism but otherwise retain their integrity. Two brick columns mark the location of missing iron gates at the entrance. The cemetery was listed on the National Register of Historic Places on May 9, 2003.

Seven of the ornately carved markers were identified as the work of the family of Charleston stone carver Thomas Walker, who started a family business in 1794 that lasted until 1904.
