= Coming Street Cemetery =

Historic Jewish cemetery in South Carolina

- U.S. National Register of Historic Places
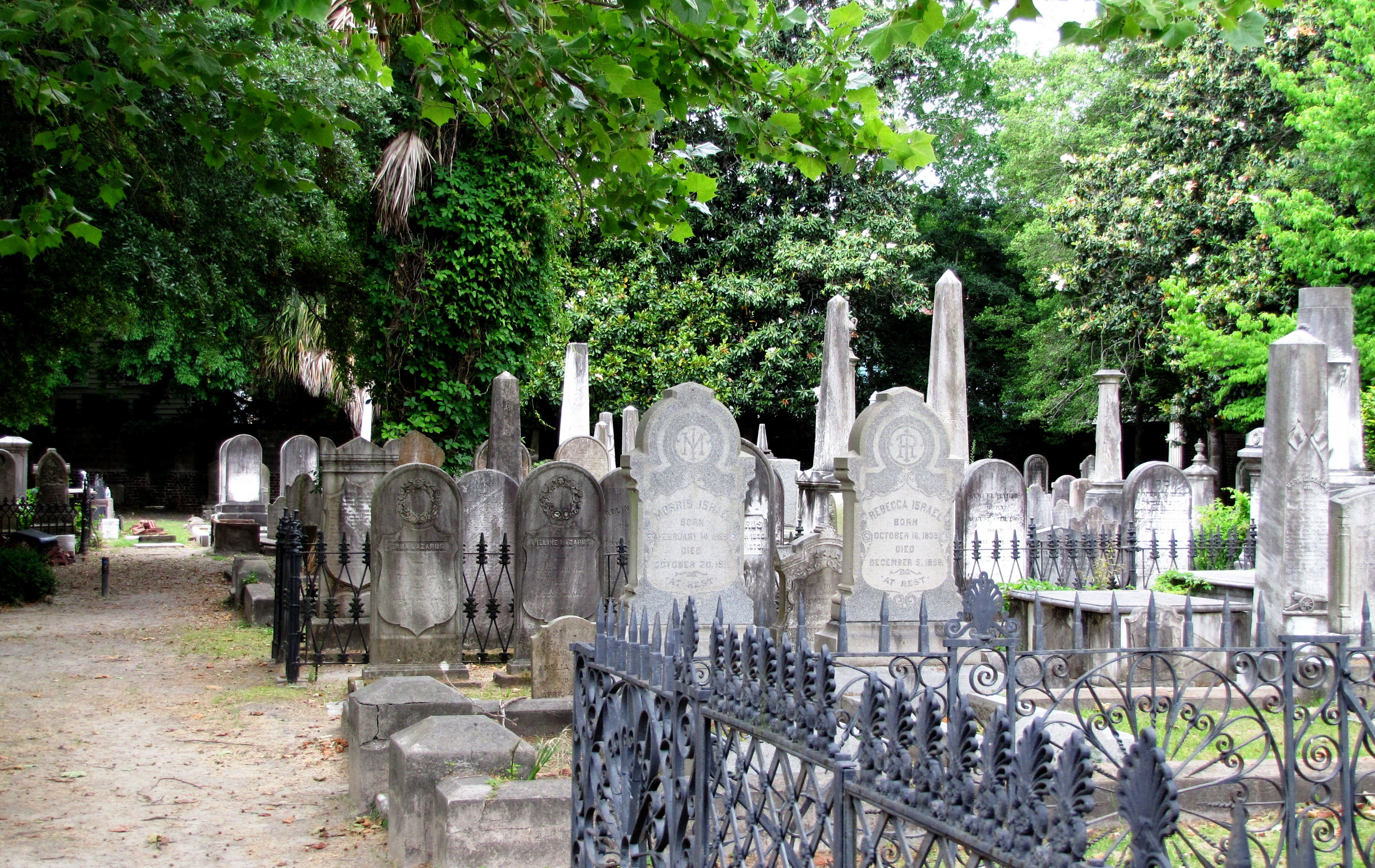

- Location within South Carolina Location within the United States
- Location: 189 Coming St., Charleston, South Carolina
- Coordinates: 32°47′23″N 79°56′34″W
- Area: less than one acre
- Built: 1762
- NRHP reference No.: 96001223
- Added to NRHP: November 05, 1996

The Coming Street Cemetery is located at 189 Coming Street, in Charleston, South Carolina. This Jewish cemetery, one of the oldest in the United States was founded in 1762 by Sephardi Jews and is the oldest Jewish burial ground in the South. Burials in the Coming Street Cemetery are now restricted to the few vacancies in the adjacent family plots. The cemetery was listed on the National Register of Historic Places in 1996.

The Coming Street cemetery is a private burial ground owned by Kahal Kadosh Beth Elohim Synagogue and a donation is requested in order to be given a tour of the cemetery.

== See also ==
- List of cemeteries in South Carolina
