= Lucas Family Cemetery =

Cemetery in South Carolina, US

- U.S. National Register of Historic Places
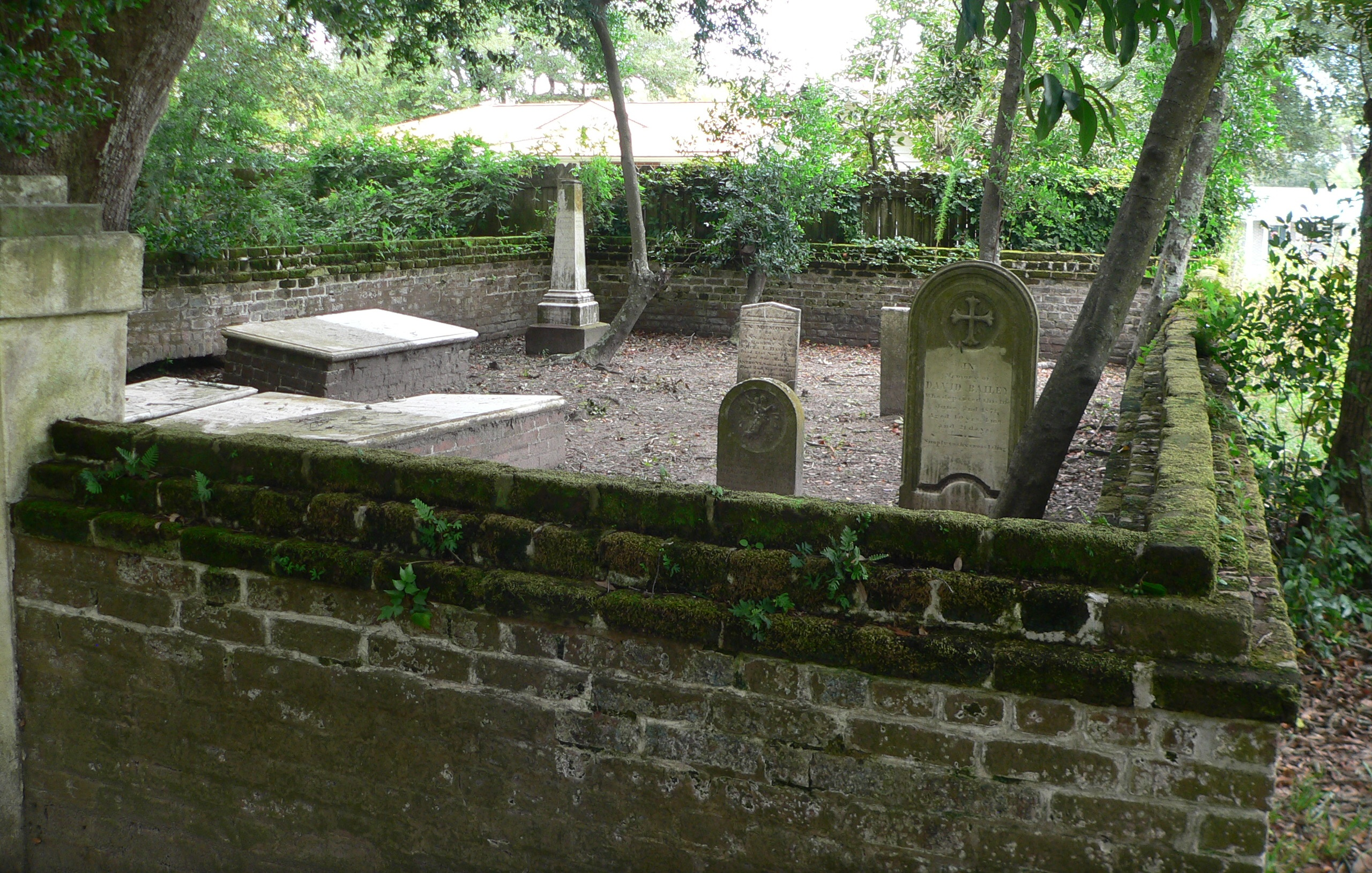
- Lucas Family Cemetery, September 2011

- Location within South Carolina Location within the United States
- Location: Ellen Dr., Mount Pleasant, South Carolina
- Coordinates: 32°47′45″N 79°52′18″W
- Area: less than one acre
- Built: c. 1825–1892
- NRHP reference No.: 98000425
- Added to NRHP: May 18, 1998

Lucas Family Cemetery is a historic plantation cemetery located near Mount Pleasant, Charleston County, South Carolina. It was established in 1825, and the walled plot includes several grave markers signed by Charleston carvers. Eleven gravemarkers remain, dating from 1825 to 1892, and five are brick box tombs with slab or table tops. The cemetery is significant for being a rare example of traditional family cemetery arrangement in the lowcountry.

The cemetery was listed on the National Register of Historic Places in 1998.
