= Lawton-Seabrook Cemetery =

Private cemetery in South Carolina, USA

- U.S. National Register of Historic Places
- Location within South Carolina Location within the United States
- Location: 7938 Steamboat Landing Rd., Edisto Island, South Carolina
- Coordinates: 32°35′24″N 80°17′42″W
- NRHP reference No.: 100001075
- Added to NRHP: June 12, 2017

The Lawton-Seabrook Cemetery is a small private cemetery at 7938 Steamboat Landing Road on Edisto Island, South Carolina. It is notable for its high-quality brick perimeter wall, and for its funerary markers, which are attributed to local master carver Thomas Walker and his family. There are only seven original gravestones, with additional otherwise unmarked potential graves marked by modern stones.

The cemetery was listed on the National Register of Historic Places in 2017.

== See also ==
- National Register of Historic Places listings in Charleston County, South Carolina
