= Sandfield Cemetery (Richland County, South Carolina) =

Historic cemetery

Details
- Established: c. 1772
- Location: Blythewood, Richland County, South Carolina, U.S.
- Country: United States
- Coordinates: 34.22099°N 80.93915°W
- Type: Baptist
- No. of graves: roughly 23
- Find a Grave: Sandfield Cemetery

Sandfield Cemetery, also known as Sandfield Baptist Cemetery, is a historic Baptist cemetery founded before 1772, located in Richland County, South Carolina, United States. It is currently maintained by the Sandy Level Baptist Church in Blythewood, and this cemetery site has a historical marker.

== History ==
The Sandfield Cemetery was established before 1772 (the exact founding date is unknown) by the Twenty-Five Mile Creek Church, a Primitive Baptist congregation. By c. 1830, the cemetery was renamed Sandfield Cemetery by the Sandfield Church; and by 1843, this congregation became Sandy Level Baptist Church.

The Sandy Level Baptist Church has a connected cemetery named Sandy Level Baptist Church Cemetery at 408 Blythewood Road, and it is located nearby the Sandfield Cemetery. There is no indication of how many people are buried at this site.

== See also ==
- List of cemeteries in the United States
