= Hatton House =

Hatton House may refer to:

- Haltoun House, Scottish baronial mansion
- Hatton House (Pomaria, South Carolina)
