= James Haskell Hope =

American politician (1874–1952)

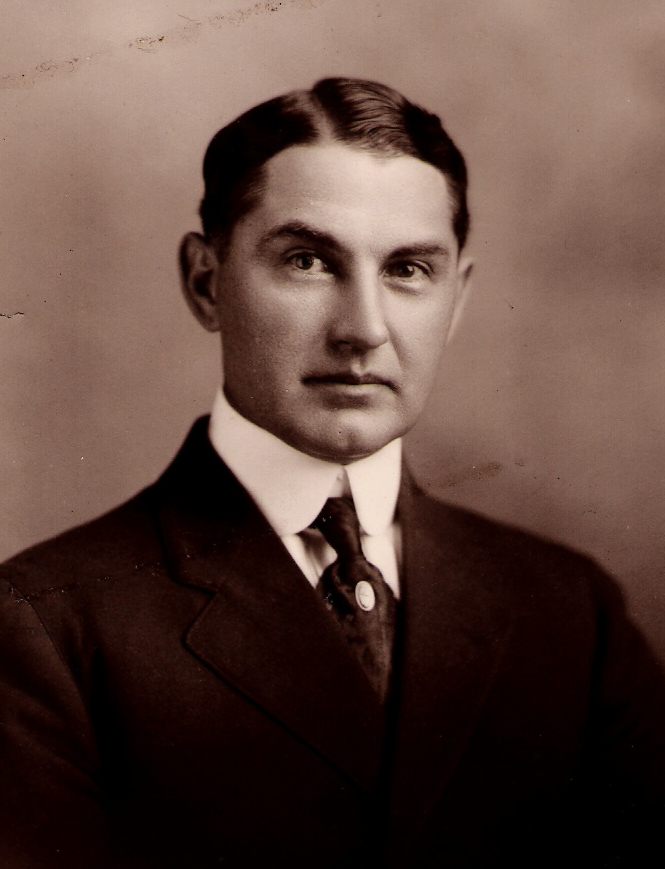
- James Haskell Hope

10th South Carolina Superintendent of Education
- In office 1922–1945
- Preceded by: John E. Swearwingen
- Succeeded by: Jesse T. Anderson

Personal details
- Born: September 22, 1874 Pomaria, South Carolina
- Died: January 18, 1952 (aged 77) Columbia, South Carolina
- Party: Democratic
- Spouse: Wilhelmina Grimsley
- Occupation: Politician, schoolteacher

James Haskell Hope (September 22, 1874 – January 18, 1952) was the longest-serving Superintendent of Education in the state of South Carolina, from 1922 until 1945.

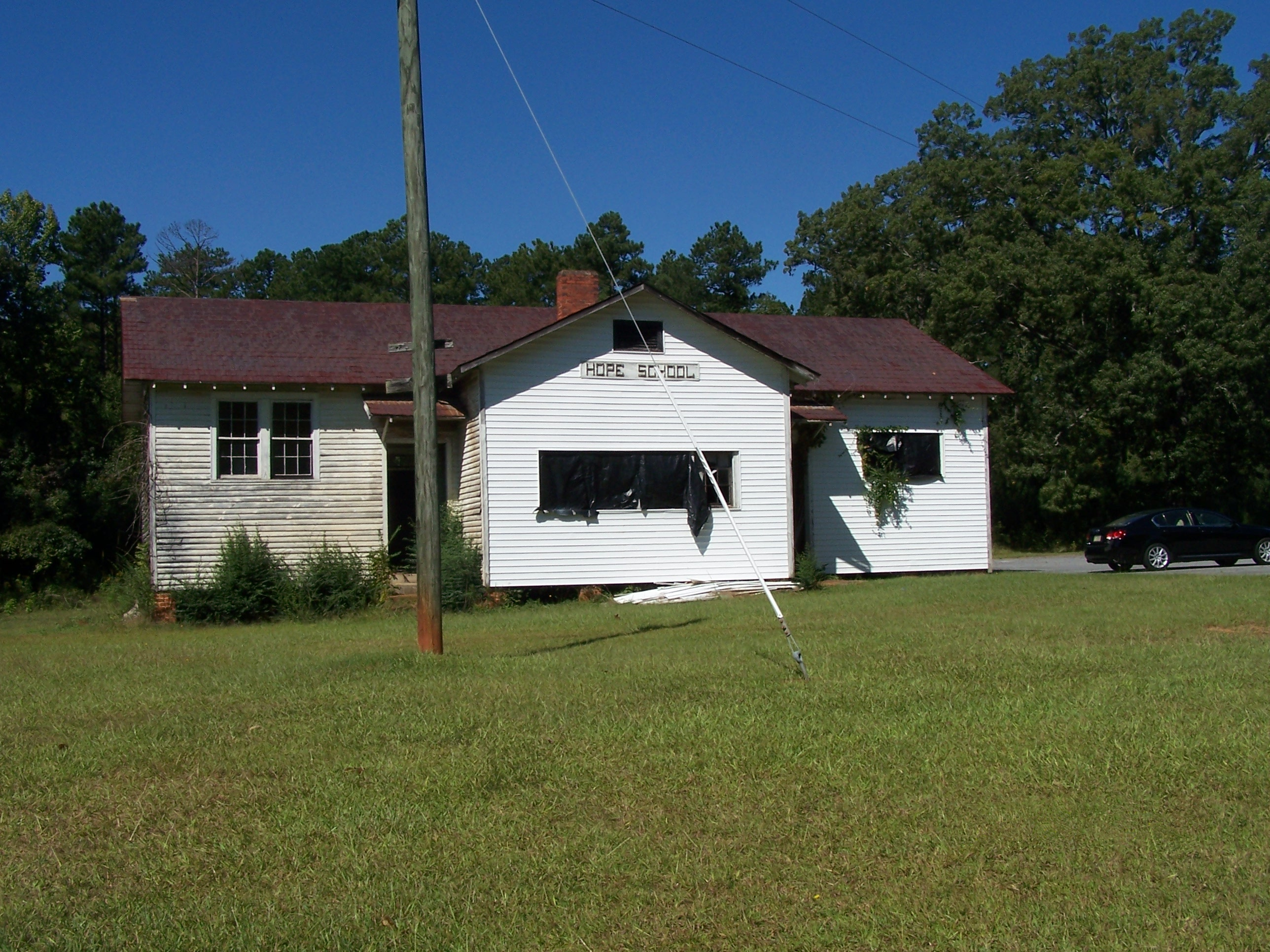
Hope School in 2006

Friends called him "Bud." In 1925, Hope and his siblings J.J. Hope and Mary Hope Hipp paid for and donated 2 acres (8,100 m^{2}) of land to the Rosenwald Fund. This became the Hope Rosenwald School. James Hope is known for his defending of the rights of African Americans before and during his term in office.

== Hope Station ==
James Haskell Hope was born in Hope Station, the tract of land that Hope's German ancestor had built and maintained. It was called Hope Station because of the local train station called by the same name. Hope Station began as a stopping point on the old Greenville and Columbia Railroad, built around 1850. The line also included stops in Peak, Pomaria, Prosperity, Newberry and Silverstreet.

== Colleges and clubs ==
- Class of 1896 Clemson Agricultural College
- Master's degree at Newberry College
- Free Masons
- Wardlaw Club
- Democratic Club

== Superintendent of Education ==
Hope was elected to be the South Carolina Superintendent of Education in 1922. During Hope's reign, African-Americans were awarded high school diplomas for the very first time. Also, a teacher retirement plan was created, an attendance law was passed, and the 12th grade was introduced in South Carolina. James Haskell Hope was a member of the Democratic Party.
