= Folk-Holloway House =

Historic house in South Carolina, United States

- U.S. National Register of Historic Places
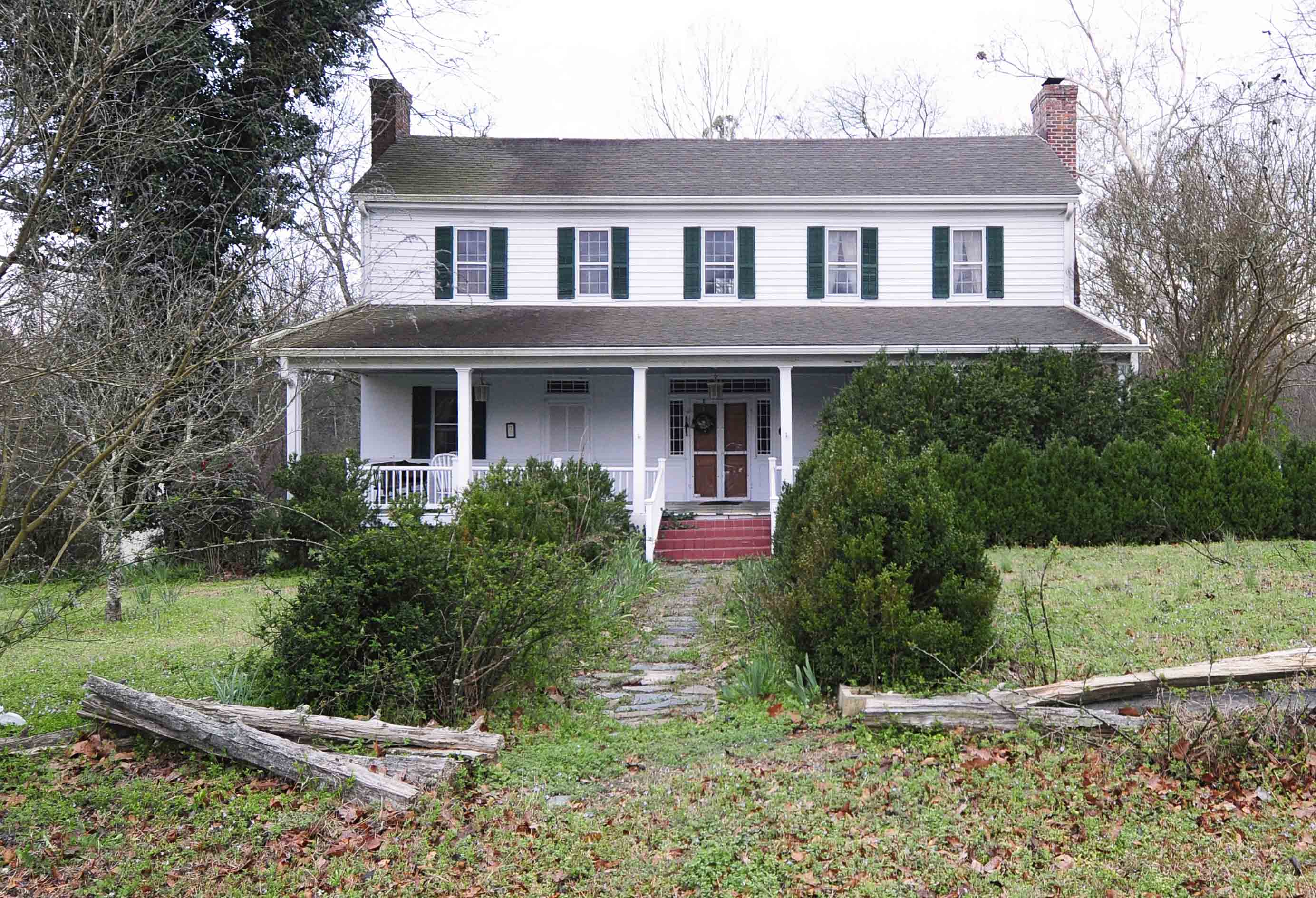
- Folk-Holloway House, March 2012

- Location within South Carolina Location within the United States
- Location: Jct. of Holloway (Columbia Hwy. or Co. Rt. 107) and Folk Sts., Pomaria, South Carolina
- Coordinates: 34°16′4″N 81°25′12″W
- Area: 7.3 acres (3.0 ha)
- Built: c. 1835
- Architectural style: Greek Revival, Federal, 19th-century Neoclassical
- NRHP reference No.: 92000963
- Added to NRHP: July 30, 1992

Folk-Holloway House is a historic home located at Pomaria, Newberry County, South Carolina. It was built about 1835, and is a two-story, single pile frame I-house. It features a recessed front porch deck and freestanding columns. The house reflects Federal and Greek Revival style design elements.

It was listed on the National Register of Historic Places in 1992.
