= Pomaria (Summer–Huggins House) =

Historic house in South Carolina, United States

- U.S. National Register of Historic Places
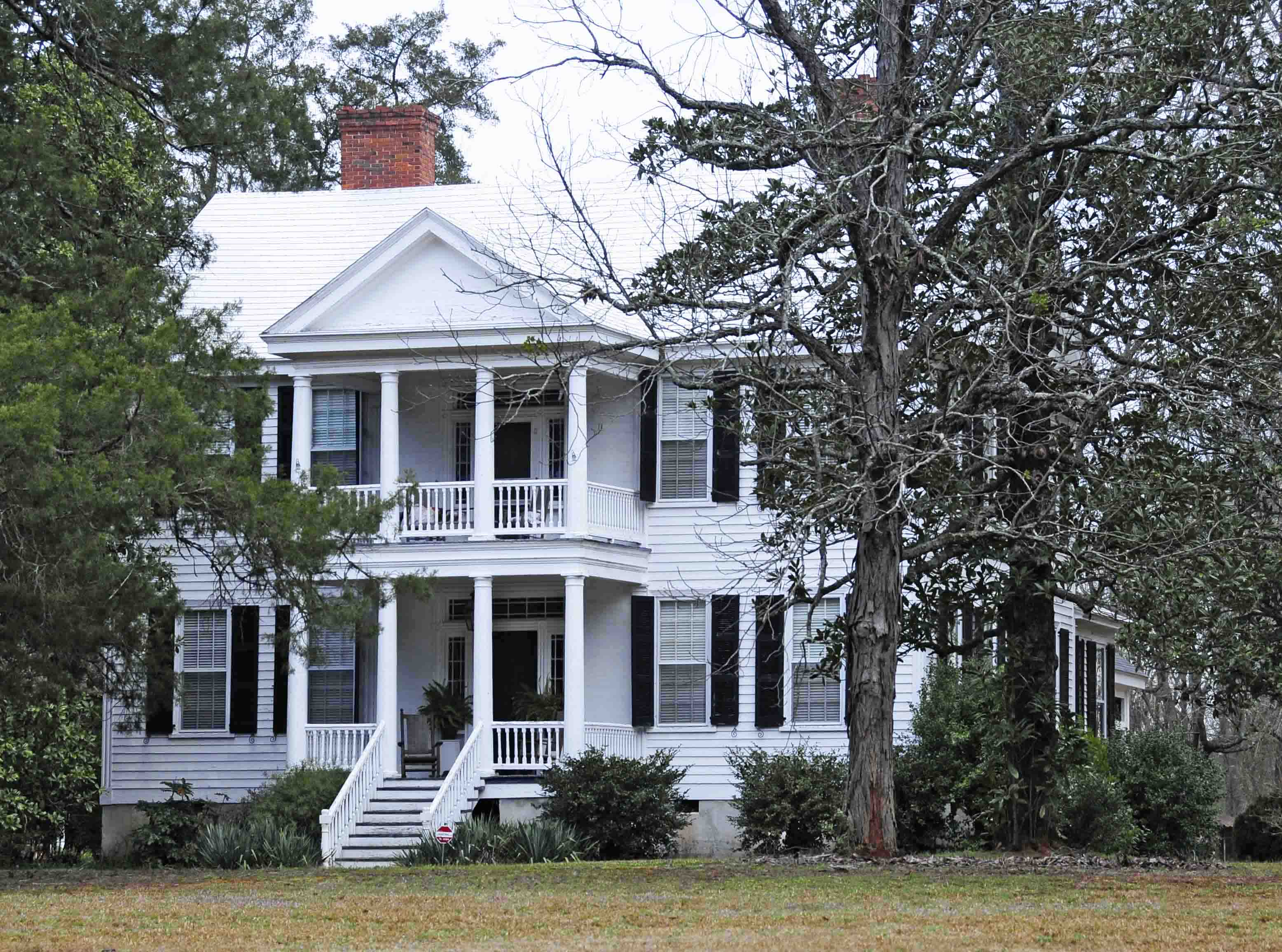
- Pomaria, March 2012

- Location within South Carolina Location within the United States
- Location: Southeast of Pomaria on U.S. Route 176, near Pomaria, South Carolina
- Coordinates: 34°15′15″N 81°23′8″W
- Area: 2.1 acres (0.85 ha)
- Built: c. 1825, 1840
- Architectural style: Greek Revival, Gothic, Carpenter Gothic
- NRHP reference No.: 79003321
- Added to NRHP: April 24, 1979

Pomaria, also known as the Summer–Huggins House, is a historic plantation house located near Pomaria, Newberry County, South Carolina. It was built about 1825, and is a two-story, frame dwelling on a raised basement with Greek Revival and Federal style design elements. It features a two-story, projecting pedimented portico. Also on the property are the contributing log smokehouse, a board and batten privy, and a Carpenter Gothic post office, which served as the first post office in the Dutch Fork. Pomaria Nurseries were begun on the plantation in 1840.

It was listed on the National Register of Historic Places in 1979.
