= St. John's Lutheran Church (Pomaria, South Carolina) =

Historic church in South Carolina, United States

- St. John Lutheran Church
- U.S. National Register of Historic Places
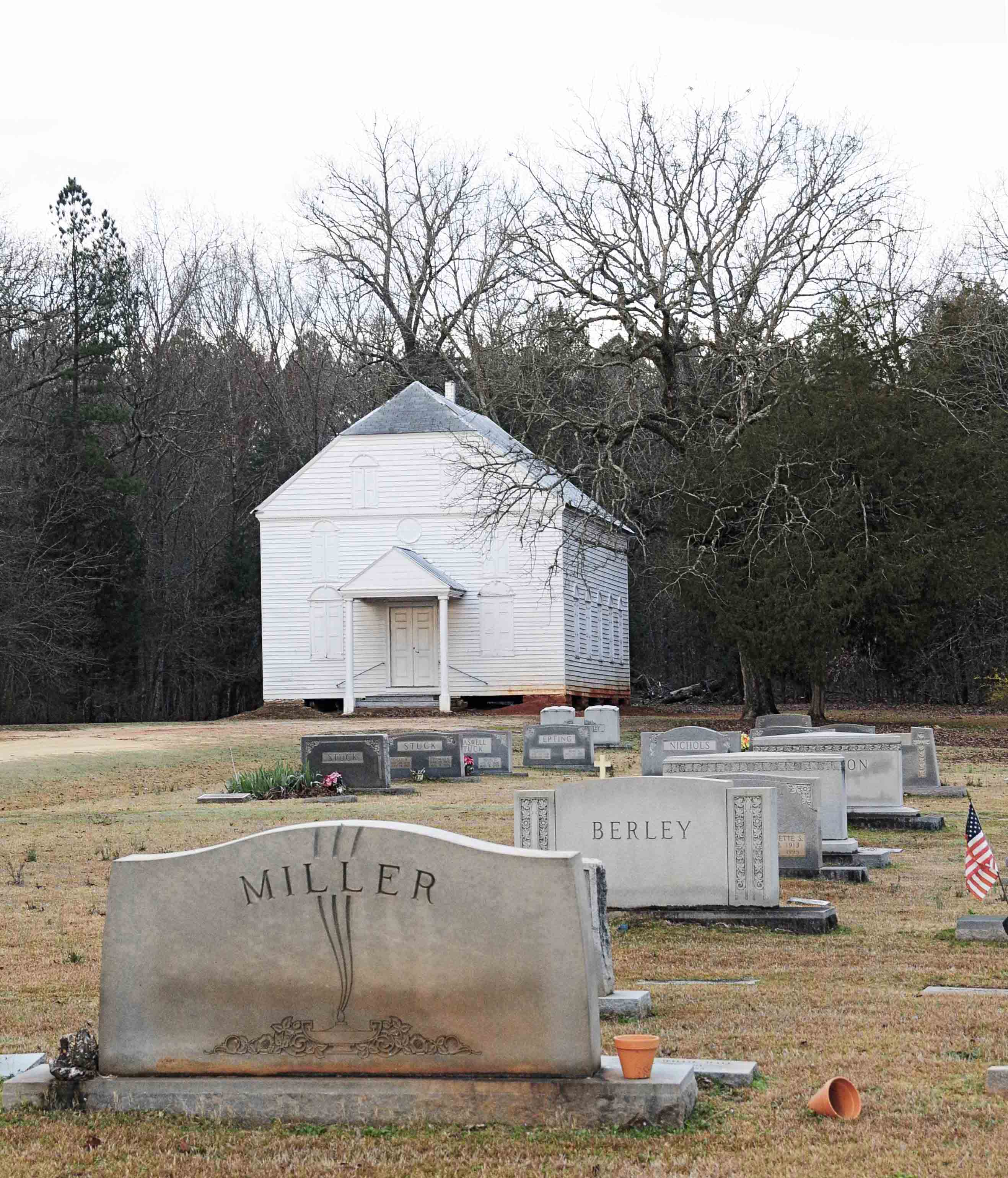

- Location within South Carolina Location within the United States
- Location: 622 Hope Station Road, Pomaria, South Carolina
- Coordinates: 34°15′11″N 81°22′18″W
- Area: 12.9 acres (5.2 ha)
- Built: 1809
- NRHP reference No.: 78002527
- Added to NRHP: December 8, 1978

St. John Lutheran Church is a historic Lutheran congregation in Pomaria, South Carolina affiliated with the Evangelical Lutheran Church in America. It was listed on the National Register of Historic Places in 1978.

It traces its origins to 1754, when Reformed minister Rev. John Glasser of Thurgau moved to the area to minister to nearby German-speaking settlements. It was the first Reformed church in the Dutch Fork.

After worshipping in log cabins, the congregation moved into the "Old White Church", a painted wood-frame structure, in 1809. The historic church served as its house of worship for 141 years, until the modern brick structure was opened in 1950. The Old White Church was added to the National Register of Historic Places in 1978.
