= Hope Rosenwald School =

- U.S. National Register of Historic Places
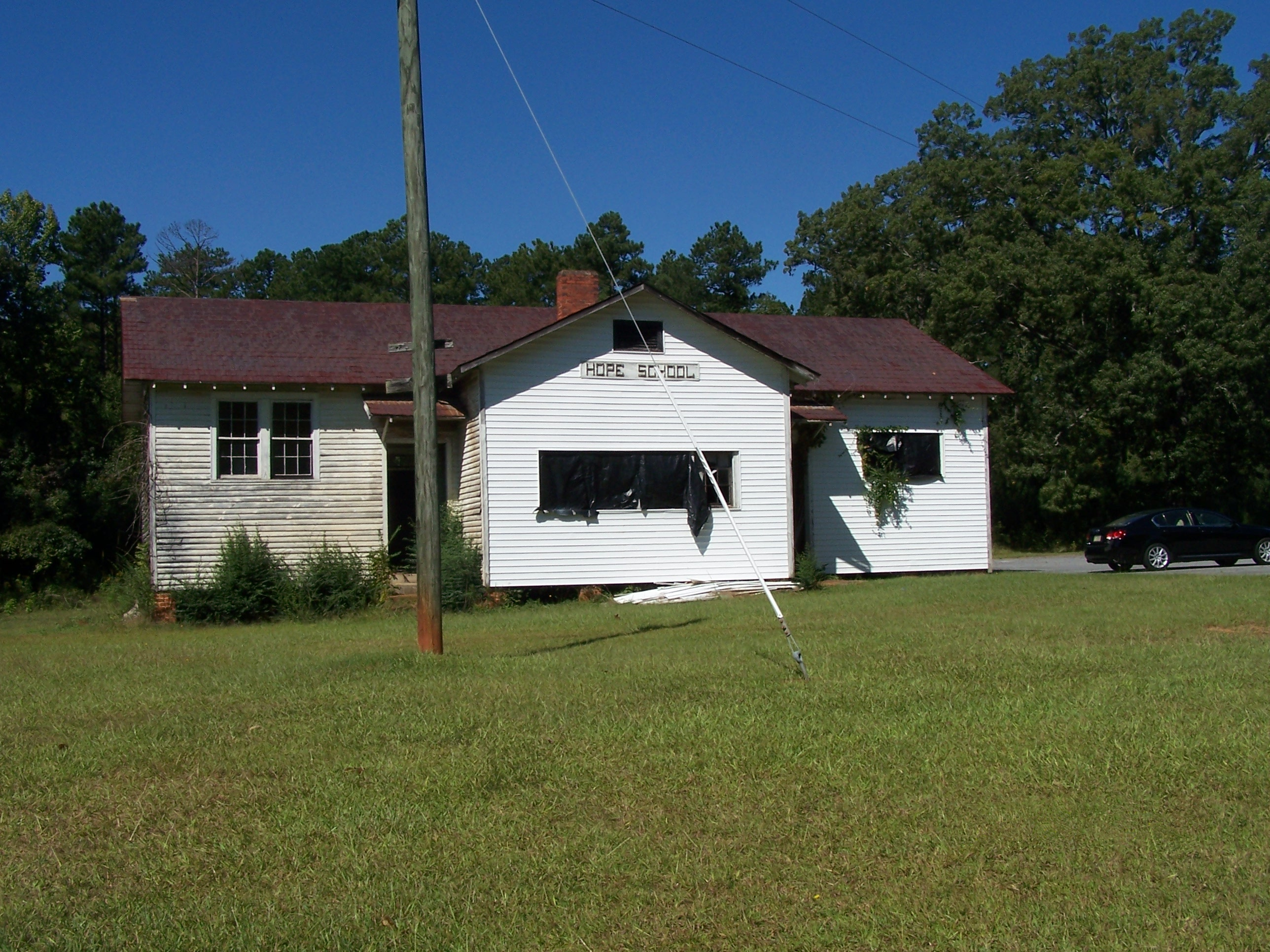
- Hope Rosenwald School in 2006

- Location within South Carolina Location within the United States
- Location: 1971 Hope Station Rd.
- Nearest city: Pomaria, South Carolina
- Coordinates: 34°16′13″N 81°21′53″W
- Area: 2 acres (0.81 ha)
- Built: 1925-1926
- Architect: Fletcher B. Dresslar; Samuel L. Smith
- Architectural style: Colonial Revival
- NRHP reference No.: 07001045
- Added to NRHP: October 3, 2007

The Hope Rosenwald School, also known as Hope School, is a former school at 1971 Hope Station Road near Pomaria, South Carolina. As a Rosenwald School, it served rural African-American children in the early 20th century.

It was listed on the National Register of Historic Places in 2007.

== History ==
James Haskell Hope, the South Carolina Superintendent of Education from 1922 to 1945, sold more than 2 acres (8,100 m^{2}) of his land for the "gift-like' price of $5 to the Trustees of School District No. 60 for Newberry County, South Carolina in 1925. Donations of $2,200 were raised. Of the private donations, $600 came from African Americans, and $400 from white Americans. State and local government contributed $1,200. The Rosenwald Fund gave $700.

The building is based on the Rosenwald Two-Teacher Community School, Floor Plan No. 20. This simple design has elements of Colonial Revival architecture. The building has a wooden frame structure, a brick foundation, and a corrugated metal roof. It is next to St. Paul AME Church. Two teachers worked in the schoolhouse: one led the first, second, and third grades; another taught the fourth, fifth, and sixth. The school was closed in 1954 with the consolidation of public schools. There were still alumni of the school living in or near Pomaria as of January 2007. Desks, a wood-burning stove, and a sign are in the collection of the National Museum of African American History and Culture.

There also have information on Rosenwald Schools in South Carolina.

The legendary Thurman Ruth, gospel singer, deejay, and concert promoter, was born in Pomaria in 1914. He moved to Brooklyn with his family in 1922 where an early age he organized a gospel quartet, the Selah Jubilee Singers, out of the choir at St. Mark Holy Church (Pentecostal) where they sang every Sunday night for about 10 years. Later Ruth arranged for them to perform along with other black gospel groups on Thurman's Gospel Caravan at the Apollo Theatre in Harlem.

== Hope School Community Center, Inc. ==
On April 20, 2005, the Hope school was registered with the South Carolina Secretary of State as a non-profit organization as "Hope School Community Center, Inc."

The organization's mission is to supply the needs of the community by administering programs that will have a positive impact on the quality of life for community residents.
