= Pomaria, South Carolina =

- Town
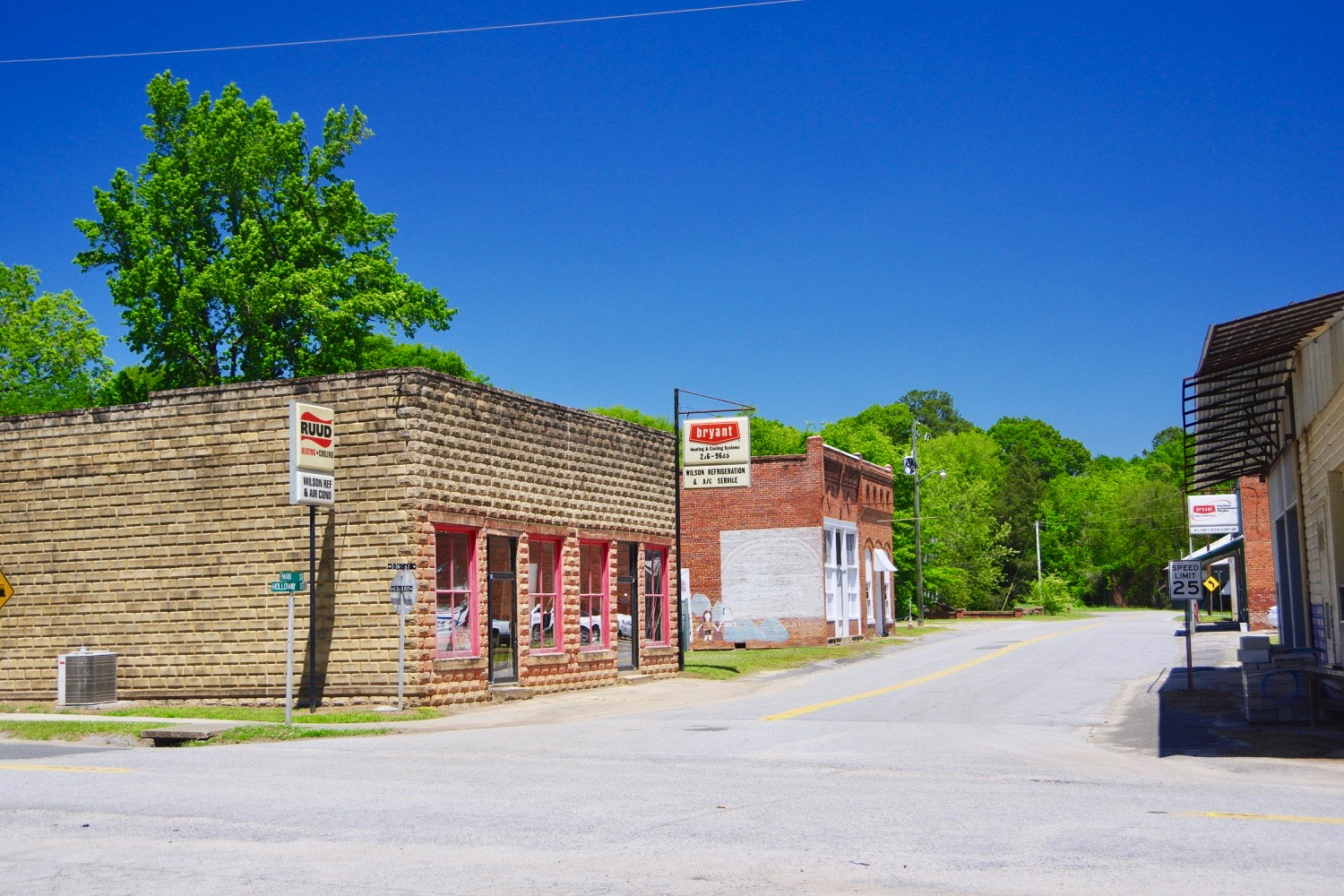
- Main Street

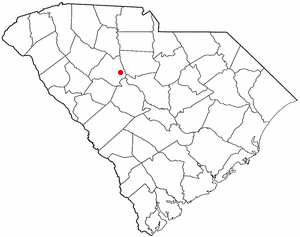
- Location of Pomaria, South Carolina
- Coordinates: 34°16′04″N 81°25′09″W
- Country: United States
- State: South Carolina
- County: Newberry

Area
  - Total: 1.05 sq mi (2.73 km^{2})
  - Land: 1.05 sq mi (2.71 km^{2})
  - Water: 0.0077 sq mi (0.02 km^{2})
- Elevation: 387 ft (118 m)

Population (2020)
  - Total: 127
  - Density: 121.4/sq mi (46.86/km^{2})
- Time zone: UTC-5 (Eastern (EST))
  - Summer (DST): UTC-4 (EDT)
- ZIP code: 29126
- Area codes: 803 and 839
- FIPS code: 45-57850
- GNIS feature ID: 2407144
- Website: https://www.townofpomariasc.com/

Pomaria is a town in Newberry County, South Carolina, United States. The population was 127 at the 2020 census.

== History ==
Pomaria was first settled in the mid 18th century by German, Swiss, and Dutch immigrants escaping the poverty and harsh conditions resulting from the Thirty Years' War. Many of these immigrants brought with them the beliefs and ideals of their Lutheran religion.

The first meeting of the South Carolina Lutheran Synod was in the house of John Eichelberger, who lived in Pomaria. Some of the later presidents of The Synod lived in or preached in and around Pomaria.

Pomaria was later shaped by the establishment of the Hope School. The Hope School was a Rosenwald School to help rural African-Americans attend school. The land was donated by the family of James Haskell Hope, who later became the longest serving Superintendent of Education of South Carolina.

In addition to Hope School, the Folk-Holloway House, Hatton House, Pomaria (Summer-Huggins House), and St. John's Lutheran Church are listed on the National Register of Historic Places.

Pomaria was the birthplace and boyhood home of Thermon Ruth, founder of the Selah Jubilee Singers and promoter of gospel music at the Apollo Theater in Harlem.

== Geography ==
According to the United States Census Bureau, the town has a total area of 1.0 square mile (2.6 km^{2}), of which 1.0 square mile (2.6 km^{2}) is land and 0.95% is water.

== Demographics ==
Historical population
| Census | Pop. | Note | %± |
|---|---|---|---|
| 1910 | 238 | | — |
| 1920 | 288 | | 21.0% |
| 1930 | 263 | | −8.7% |
| 1940 | 263 | | 0.0% |
| 1950 | 251 | | −4.6% |
| 1960 | 230 | | −8.4% |
| 1970 | 264 | | 14.8% |
| 1980 | 271 | | 2.7% |
| 1990 | 267 | | −1.5% |
| 2000 | 177 | | −33.7% |
| 2010 | 179 | | 1.1% |
| 2020 | 127 | | −29.1% |
U.S. Decennial Census

As of the census of 2000, there were 177 people, 70 households, and 46 families residing in the town. The population density was 170.1 inhabitants per square mile (65.7/km^{2}). There were 84 housing units at an average density of 80.7 per square mile (31.2/km^{2}). The racial makeup of the town was 54.8 percent White, 41.24 percent African American, 1.69 percent from other races, and 2.26 percent from two or more races. Hispanic or Latino of any race were 2.26 percent of the population.

There were 70 households, out of which 30 percent had children under the age of 18 living with them, 45.7 percent were married couples living together, 15.7 percent had a female householder with no husband present, and 32.9 percent were non-families. Some 24.3 percent of all households were made up of individuals, and 10 percent had someone living alone who was 65 years of age or older. The average household size was 2.53 and the average family size was 2.91.

In the town, the population was spread out, with 23.2 percent under the age of 18, 9.6 percent from 18 to 24, 29.9 percent from 25 to 44, 19.8 percent from 45 to 64, and 17.5 percent who were 65 years of age or older. The median age was 38 years. For every 100 females, there were 124.1 males. For every 100 females age 18 and over, there were 106.1 males.

The median income for a household in the town was $45,000, and the median income for a family was $49,000. Males had a median income of $24,688 versus $25,313 for females. The per capita income for the town was $20,524. About 2.1 percent of families and 9.7 percent of the population were below the poverty line, including 12.9 percent of those under the age of 18 and 14.3 percent of those 65 or over.
