= Hatton House (Pomaria, South Carolina) =

Historic house in South Carolina, United States

- U.S. National Register of Historic Places
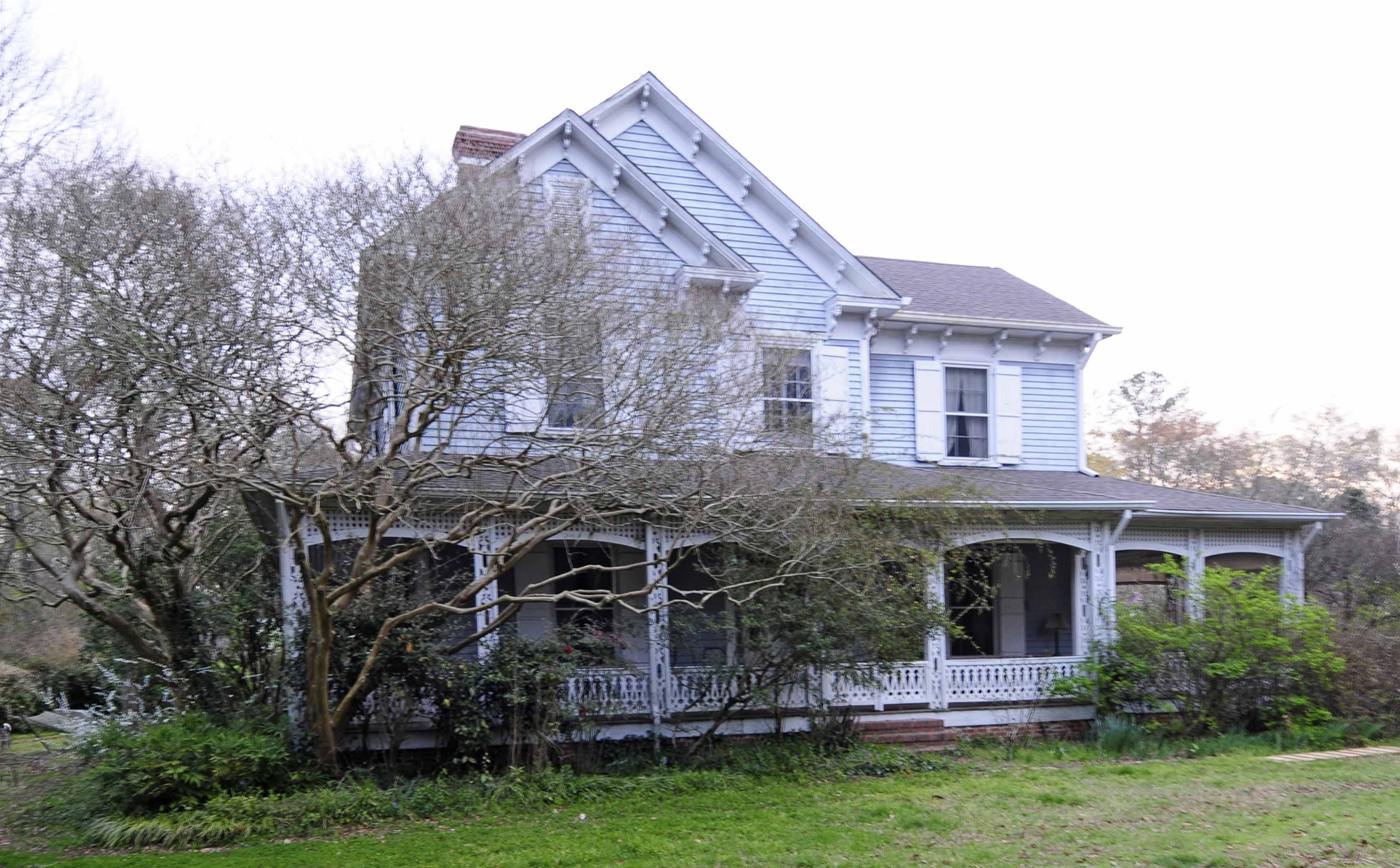
- Hatton House, March 2012

- Location within South Carolina Location within the United States
- Location: Holloway St. between Folk St. and US 176, Pomaria, South Carolina
- Coordinates: 34°16′11″N 81°25′20″W
- Area: 5.7 acres (2.3 ha)
- Built: c. 1892
- Built by: Cannon, Calvin; Aull, J.B.
- Architectural style: Italianate, Vernacular Italianate
- NRHP reference No.: 90001504
- Added to NRHP: October 1, 1990

Hatton House, also known as the 1892 House, is a historic home located at Pomaria, Newberry County, South Carolina. It was built about 1892, and is a two-story, frame gabled-ell cottage in a vernacular late-Italianate style. It features ornate brackets and other exterior decorative trim.

It was listed on the National Register of Historic Places in 1990.
