= Vincent Street =

Vincent Street may refer to:

- Vincent Street, North Perth, Western Australia
- Vincent Street Historic District, Newberry, South Carolina, US
