= Vincent Street Historic District =

Historic district in South Carolina, United States

- U.S. National Register of Historic Places
- U.S. Historic district
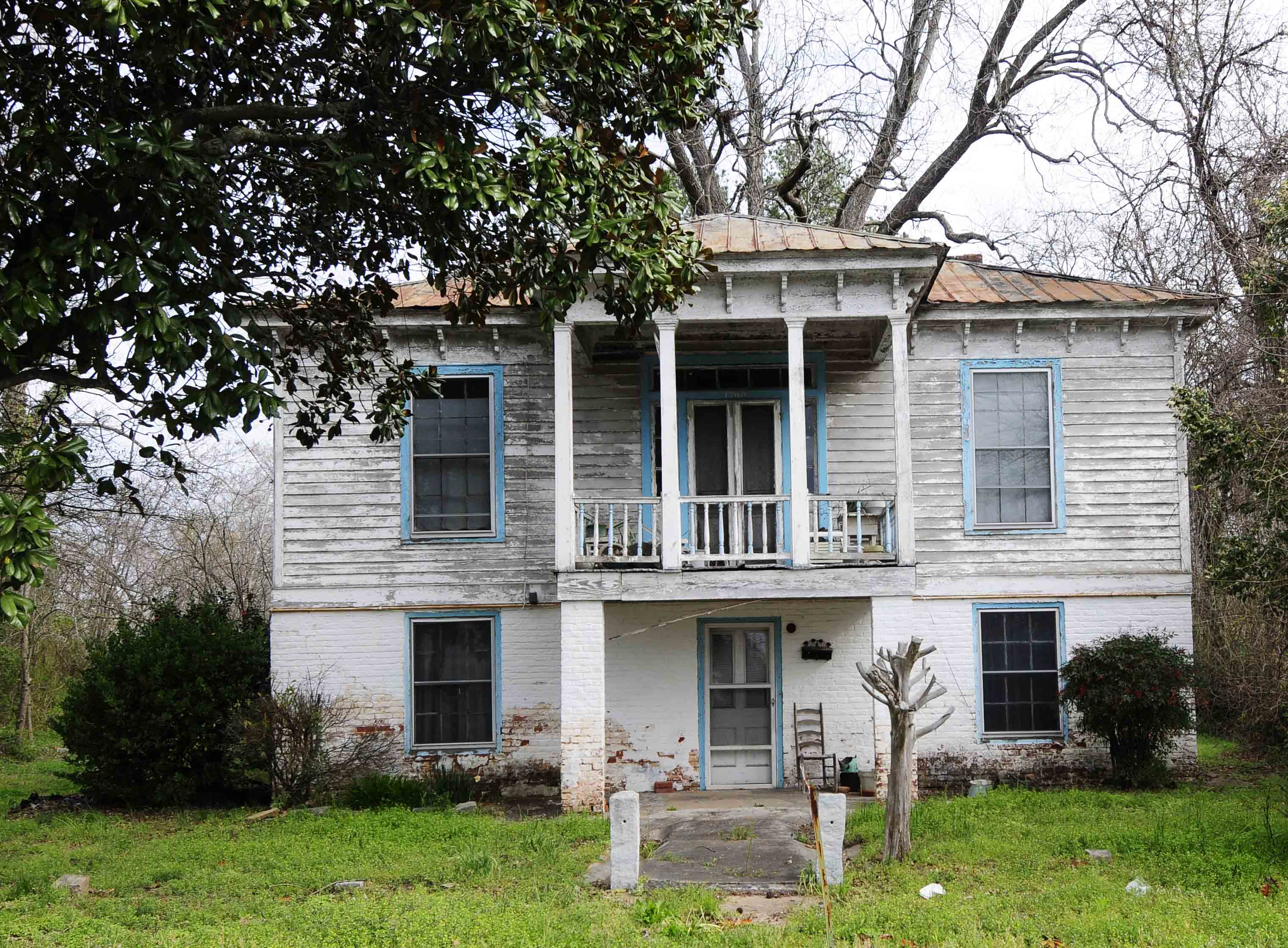
- Livingston Cottage, Vincent Street Historic District, March 2012

- Location within South Carolina Location within the United States
- Location: Vincent and Crosson Sts., Newberry, South Carolina
- Coordinates: 34°16′32″N 81°37′39″W
- Area: 2.6 acres (1.1 ha)
- Built: 1900
- Architectural style: Greek Revival, Late Victorian
- MPS: Newberry MRA
- NRHP reference No.: 80003688
- Added to NRHP: November 26, 1980

Vincent Street Historic District is a national historic district located at Newberry, Newberry County, South Carolina. The district encompasses seven contributing buildings in a compact residential neighborhood of Newberry. The residences date from the late-19th and early-20th century and include notable examples of the Greek Revival and Late Victorian styles.

It was listed on the National Register of Historic Places in 1980.
